= United States Coast Guard History and Heritage Sites =

This is a list of United States Coast Guard historical and heritage sites that are open to the public. This list includes National Historic Landmarks (NHL), the National Register of Historic Places (NRHP), cutters, museums, monuments, memorials and more. It includes only NHL Lighthouses. There are many more resources dedicated to lighthouses, this list attempts to collect everything else in one list. The United States Lighthouse Society, Lighthouse Friends and the many Wikipedia pages dedicated lighthouses are a few of the many excellent resources for those interested in lighthouses. This list captures the most important historical features, that is the NHL and the often overlooked U.S. Coast Guard sites.

The Revenue Cutter Service is not as well represented in this list compared to the other constituent agencies; those other agencies had a head start. The service did not even have a proper name for three-quarters of a century until 1863 when Congress voted to name them the "Revenue Cutter Service." The service established its first permanent shore infrastructure around 1900 at Curtis Bay, Maryland and it is still in operation today as the Coast Guard Yard. Revenue cutters operated out of their respective port and were under the operational control of the Collector of Customs of that port. Before Federal Income Tax, customs duties were the primary form of revenue, the customs house was often the hub of activity for the Federal Government in a harbor town. Beyond the customs house and perhaps a pier, it is unlikely that more shoreside infrastructure was required in the early days.

The Sites are mapped in Open Street Map, recommend searching with the name, city, and state.

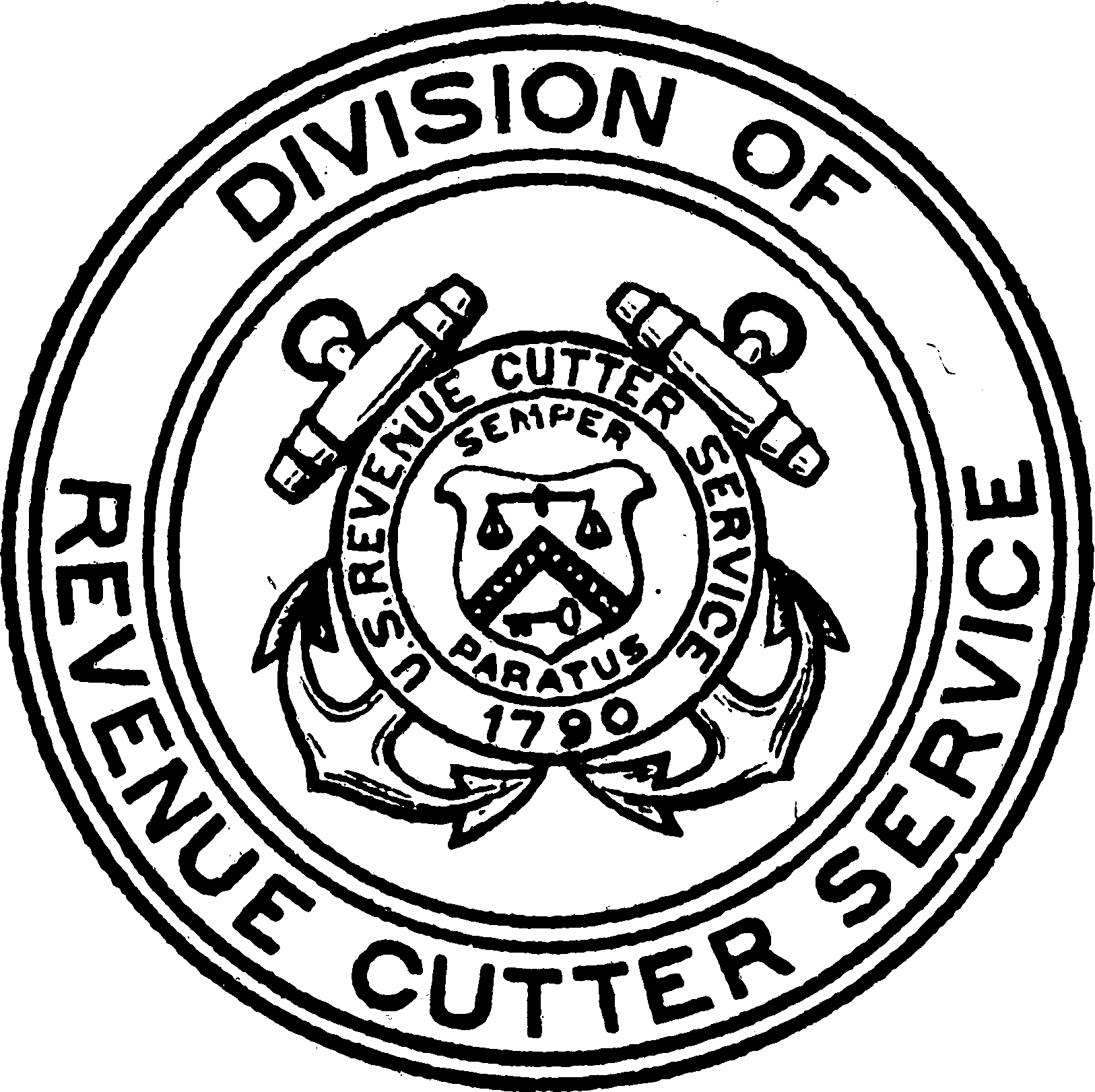
U.S. Revenue Cutter Service 1790-1915

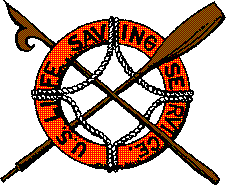
U.S. Life-Saving Service 1848-1915

U.S. Coast Guard 1915-Present

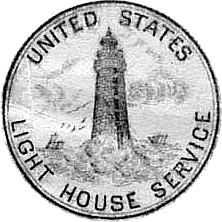
U.S. Lighthouse Service 1789-1939
U.S. Treasury Department *1790-1967

U.S. Navy *1917-1919; 1941-1945

U.S. Transportation Department 1967-2003

U.S. Department of Homeland Security 2003-Present

== Atlantic ==
=== New England ===
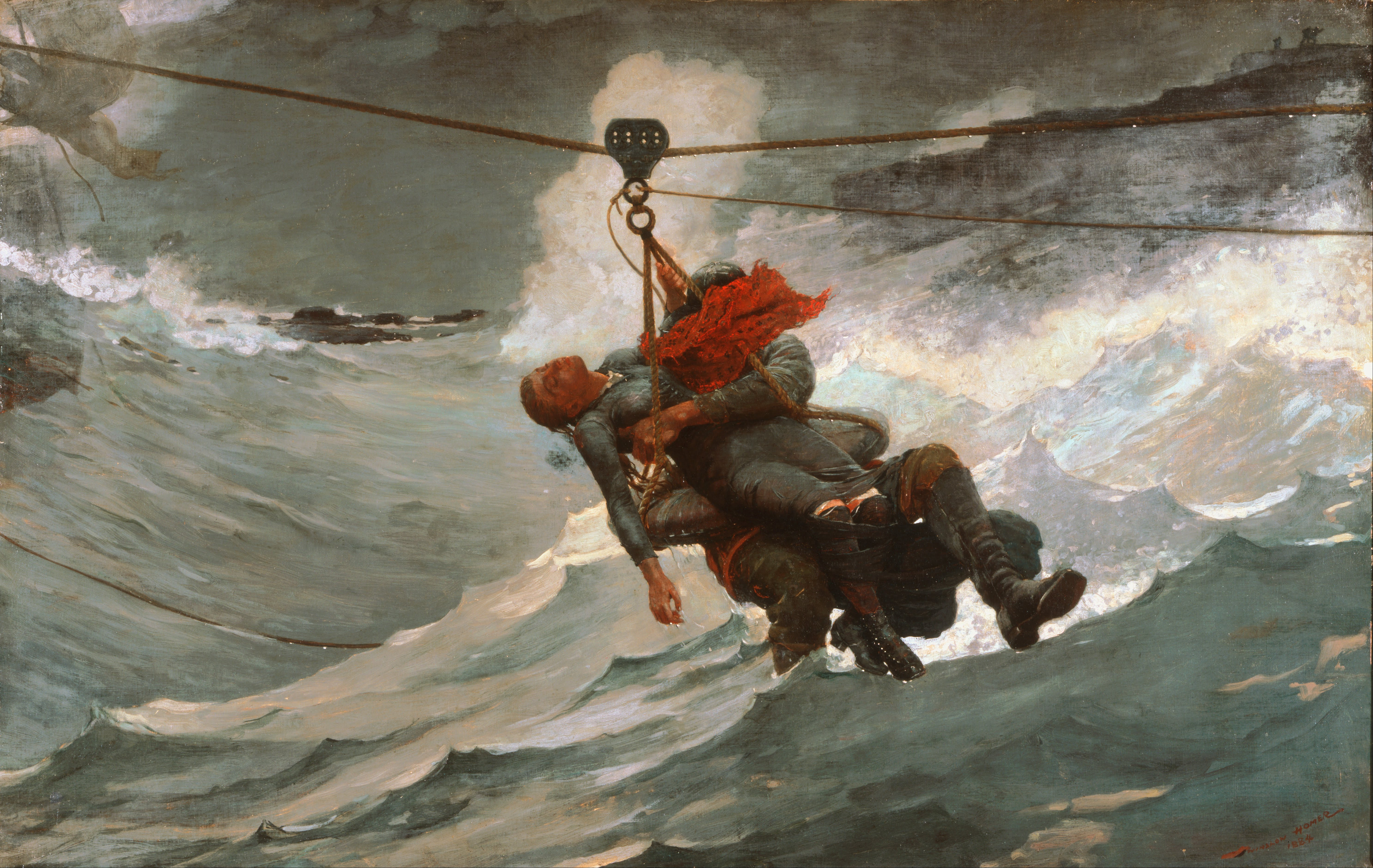
Winslow Homer painting of a Breeches Buoy

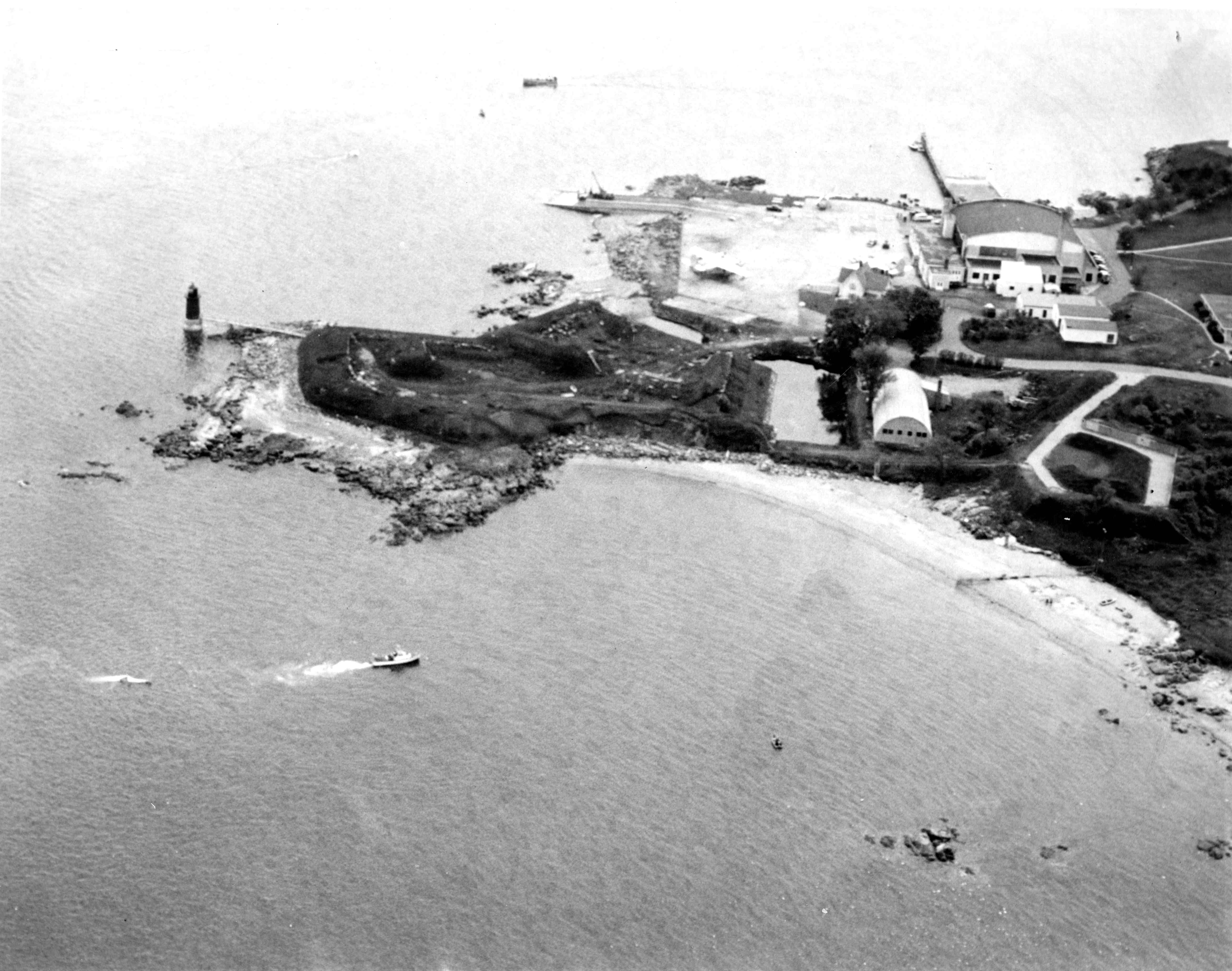
Fort Pickering, Winter Island Light, and Coast Guard Air Station Salem

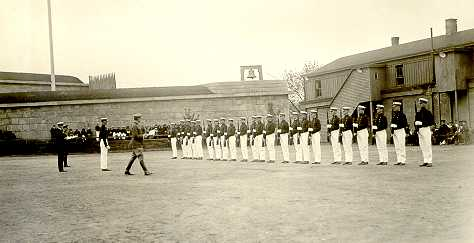
Fort Trumbull Parade Ground

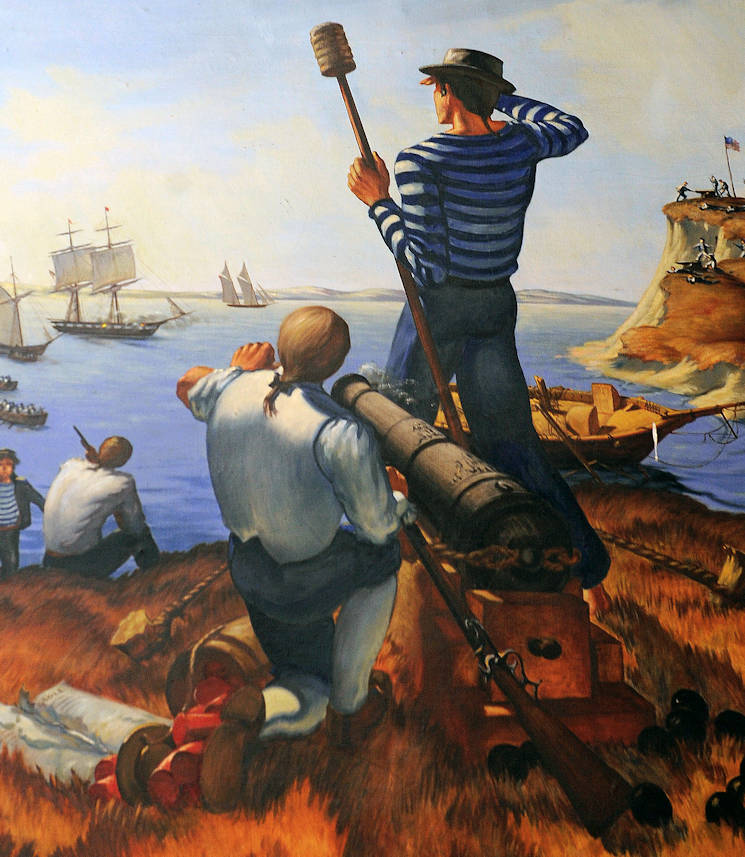
Frederick Lee commanded the Revenue Cutter Eagle

City	State	Modern Name or Locale	Era	Historical Name	NHL	NHL/NRHP #	NHL/NRHP Date	Note
Amagansett	New York	Amagansett U.S. Life-Saving and Coast Guard Station Museum	U.S. Life-Saving Service 1848–1915	Amagansett Life Saving Station	NRHP	100002743	July 27, 2018	
Amesbury	Massachusetts	Lowell's Boat Shop	U.S. Life-Saving Service 1848–1915	Lowell's Boat Shop	Yes	88000706	June 21, 1990	
Barnstable	Massachusetts	US Coast Guard Heritage Museum	U.S. Revenue Cutter Service 1790–1915	Barnstable Custom House	NRHP	75000239	November 12, 1975	
Boston	Massachusetts	Boston Light	U.S. Lighthouse Service 1789–1939	Boston Light	Yes	66000133	January 29, 1964	
Boston	Massachusetts	Lightship Nantucket LV112	U.S. Lighthouse Service 1789–1939	Lightship Nantucket LV112	Yes	89002464	December 20, 1989	
Bristol	Rhode Island	Bristol Oyster Bar	U.S. Revenue Cutter Service 1790–1915	Bristol Customshouse and Post Office	NRHP	72000015	May 31, 1972	
Chatham	Massachusetts	Chatham Coast Guard Station	U.S. Lighthouse Service 1789–1939	Chatham Light Station	NRHP	87001501	June 15, 1987	Also: Mack Memorial
Cornish	New Hampshire	The Chase House Inn	U.S. Revenue Cutter Service 1790–1915	Salmon P. Chase Birthplace	Yes	75000133	May 15, 1975	
Fort Hancock	New Jersey	Gateway National Recreation Area	U.S. Lighthouse Service 1789–1939	Sandy Hook Lighthouse	Yes	66000468	January 29, 1964	
Highlands	New Jersey	Twin Lights State Historic Site	U.S. Lighthouse Service 1789–1939	Navesink Light Station	Yes	06000237	February 17, 2006	Also Spermaceti Cove 1849 Boathouse
Hull	Massachusetts	Hull Life Saving Museum	U.S. Life-Saving Service 1848–1915	Point Allerton Lifesaving Station	NRHP	81000110	June 11, 1981	
Kennebunkport	Maine	Louis T. Graves Memorial Public Library	U.S. Revenue Cutter Service 1790–1915	Kennebunkport Custom House	NRHP	74000323	January 18, 1974	
Lubec	Maine	West Quoddy Station	U.S. Life-Saving Service 1848–1915	West Quoddy Lifesaving Station	NRHP	90000581	April 20, 1990	Also: West Quoddy Head Light and Coast Guard Trail
Madison	Connecticut	Lee's Academy	U.S. Revenue Cutter Service 1790–1915	Captain Frederick Lee	No	N/A	N/A	Also: Defense of the cutter Eagle
Marshfield	Massachusetts	Coast Guard Hill Recreation Area	U.S. Coast Guard 1915–Present	Communication Station Boston (NMF)	No	N/A	N/A	
Monmouth Beach	New Jersey	Monmouth Beach Cultural Center, NJ	U.S. Life-Saving Service 1848–1915	Monmouth Beach Life Saving Station	No	N/A	N/A	
Montauk	New York	Montauk Point Lighthouse	U.S. Lighthouse Service 1789–1939	Montauk Point Lighthouse	Yes	69000142	March 2, 2012	
Mystic	Connecticut	Mystic Seaport Museum	U.S. Life-Saving Service 1848–1915	New Shoreham Life Saving Station	No	N/A	N/A	Also: Brant Point Light replica
Nahant	Massachusetts	Nahant Life Saving Station	U.S. Life-Saving Service 1848–1915	Nahant Life Saving Station	NRHP	12000133	March 20, 2012	Now a special event venue
Nantucket	Massachusetts	Nantucket Shipwreck & Lifesaving Museum	U.S. Life-Saving Service 1848–1915	Nantucket Shipwreck & Lifesaving Museum	No	N/A	N/A	Replica
Narragansett	Rhode Island	Coast Guard House	U.S. Life-Saving Service 1848–1915	Narragansett Pier Life Saving Station	NRHP	76000010	June 30, 1976	Restaurant
Nauset	Massachusetts	Coast Guard Beach	U.S. Life-Saving Service 1848–1915	Nauset Life Saving Station	No	N/A	N/A	Operated by: Cape Cod National Seashore
New Bedford	Massachusetts	Custom House Square	U.S. Revenue Cutter Service 1790–1915	New Bedford Custom House	Yes	70000735	December 30, 1970	Part of New Bedford Whaling National Historical Park. The Custom House is still in use as a Federal office building.
New Bedford	Massachusetts	Coast Guard Park	U.S. Lighthouse Service 1789–1939	National Lightship Sailors Memorial	No	N/A	N/A	
New London	Connecticut	Custom House Maritime Museum	U.S. Revenue Cutter Service 1790–1915	New London Customhouse	NRHP	70000706	October 15, 1970	Contains exhibits on the Amistad Affair
New London	Connecticut	Fort Trumbull State Park	U.S. Revenue Cutter Service 1790–1915	Revenue Cutter School of Instruction	NRHP	72001333	September 22, 1972	
New London	Connecticut	U.S. Coast Guard Academy	U.S. Coast Guard 1915–Present	U.S. Coast Guard Museum	No	N/A	N/A	New museum in planning, see Projects Section below
New Shoreham	Rhode Island	Southeast Lighthouse	U.S. Lighthouse Service 1789–1939	Block Island South East Light	Yes	97001264	September 25, 1997	
New York	New York	Alexander Hamilton U.S. Custom House	U.S. Revenue Cutter Service 1790–1915	New York Customhouse	Yes	72000889	December 8, 1976	Contains the National Museum of the American Indian Also: Coast Guard Memorial at The Battery
New York	New York	The Battery	U.S. Coast Guard 1915–Present	Coast Guard Memorial	No	N/A	N/A	Also: Alexander Hamilton U.S. Custom House
New York	New York	Central Park	U.S. Revenue Cutter Service 1790–1915	Alexander Hamilton Monument	No	N/A	N/A	
New York	New York	Harlem Heights	U.S. Revenue Cutter Service 1790–1915	Alexander Hamilton Playground	No	N/A	N/A	
New York	New York	National Lighthouse Museum	U.S. Lighthouse Service 1789–1939	U.S. Lighthouse Depot	NRHP	83001785	September 15, 1983	
New York	New York	Pier 25	U.S. Lighthouse Service 1789–1939	USCGC Lilac	NRHP	04001441	January 7, 2005	
New York	New York	Pier 66	U.S. Lighthouse Service 1789–1939	Lightship Frying Pan LV115	NRHP	98001615	January 28, 1999	
New York	New York	Hamilton Grange National Memorial	U.S. Revenue Cutter Service 1790–1915	Hamilton Grange	Yes	66000097	December 19, 1960	Located in St. Nicolas Park
New York	New York	South Street Seaport Museum	U.S. Lighthouse Service 1789–1939	Lightship Ambrose LV87	Yes	84002758	April 11, 1989	
Newburyport	Massachusetts	Custom House Maritime Museum	U.S. Revenue Cutter Service 1790–1915	Newburyport Custom House	NRHP	71000089	February 25, 1971	Also: Coast Guard Bicentennial Monument and USCGC Evergreen Bell
Orleans	Massachusetts	Coast Guard Motor Lifeboat CG 36500	U.S. Coast Guard 1915–Present	CG-36500	NRHP	05000467	May 27, 2005	
Provincetown	Massachusetts	Old Harbor Life Saving Station	U.S. Life-Saving Service 1848–1915	Old Harbor Life Saving Station	NRHP	75000159	August 18, 1975	
Rockland	Maine	Maine Lighthouse Museum	U.S. Lighthouse Service 1789–1939	Maine Lighthouse Museum	No	N/A	N/A	Also: Buoy Park
Rockport	Massachusetts	Cape Ann Light Station	U.S. Lighthouse Service 1789–1939	Twin Lights, Thacher's Island	Yes	71000355	January 3, 2001	
Sag Harbor	New York	Custom House	U.S. Revenue Cutter Service 1790–1915	Sag Harbor Custom House	NRHP	73001274	July 20, 1973	
Salem	Massachusetts	Salem Maritime National Historic Site	U.S. Revenue Cutter Service 1790–1915	Salem Custom House	NRHP	66000048	October 15, 1966	Also: Derby Wharf Light
Salem	Massachusetts	Winter Island Marine Park	U.S. Coast Guard 1915–Present	Fort Pickering	NRHP	73000320	February 8, 1973	Coast Guard Air Station Salem and Winter Island Light are located here but not open to the public
Truro	Massachusetts	Coast Guard Beach	U.S. Coast Guard 1915–Present	Coast Guard Beach	No	N/A	N/A	Operated by: the Town of Truro, Massachusetts
Weehawken	New Jersey	Hamilton Park	U.S. Revenue Cutter Service 1790–1915	Weehawken Dueling Grounds	No	N/A	N/A	
Wellfleet	Massachusetts	The Beachcomber	U.S. Life-Saving Service 1848–1915	Cahoon's Hollow Life Saving Station	No	N/A	N/A	
Westport	Massachusetts	Horseneck Point Lifesaving Station	U.S. Life-Saving Service 1848–1915	Horseneck Point Life Saving Station	No	N/A	N/A	

=== Inland Waterways ===
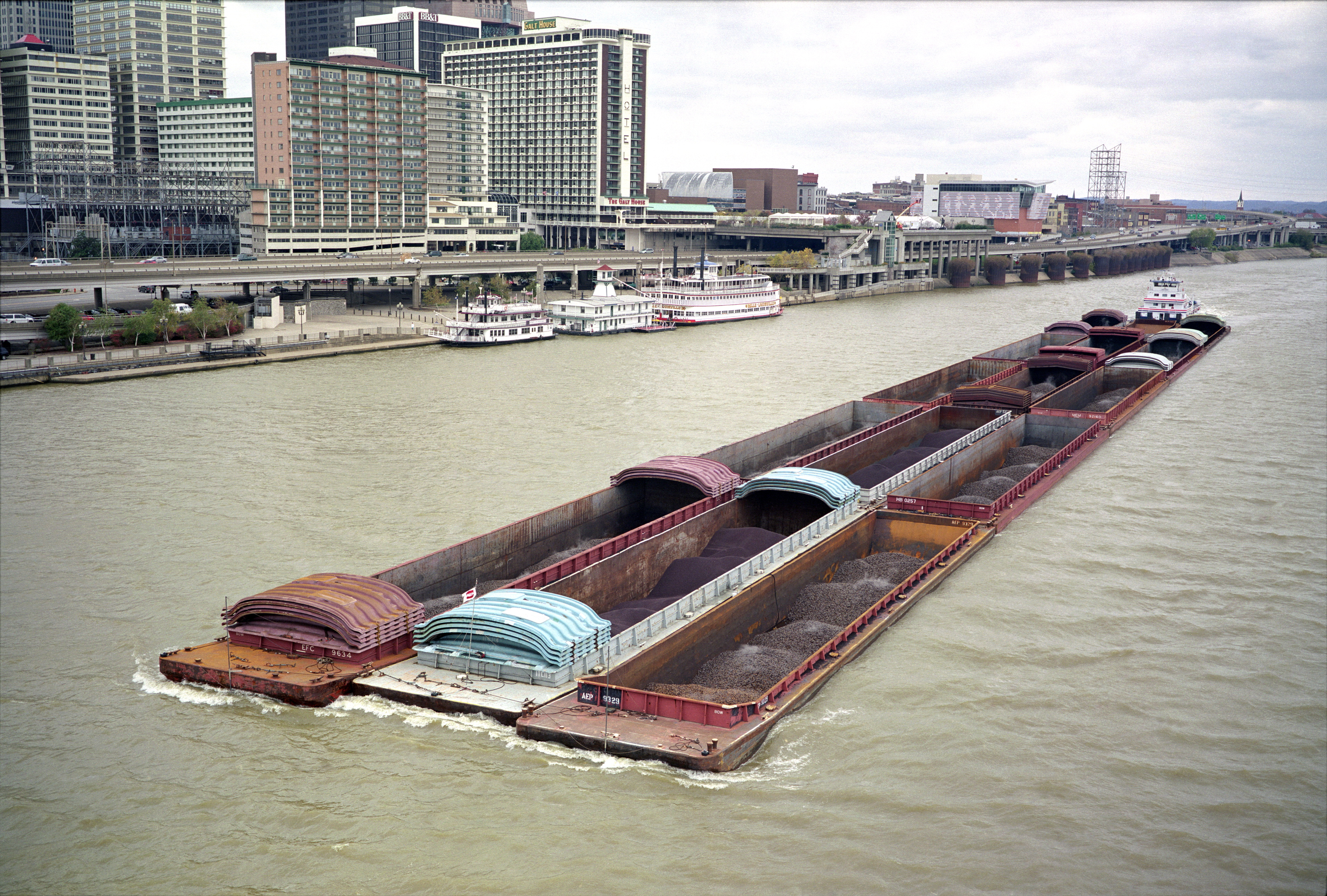
Mayor Andrew Broadus with the watchtower (moored in the middle) in its home port on Louisville, Kentucky Riverfront. Life Saving Station #10 began operations in 1881 and finally closed in 1972.

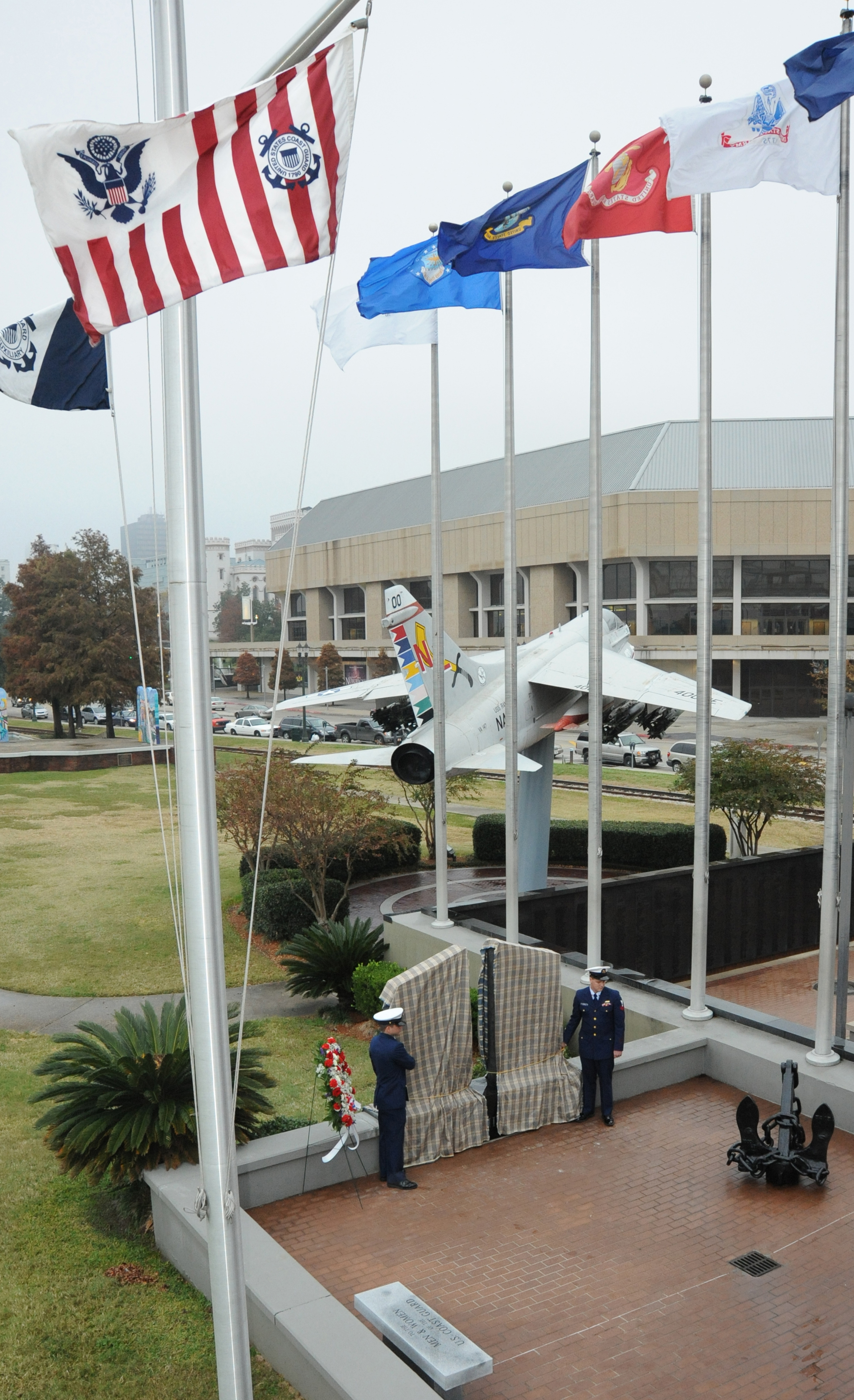
USCGC White Alder Memorial dedication ceremony

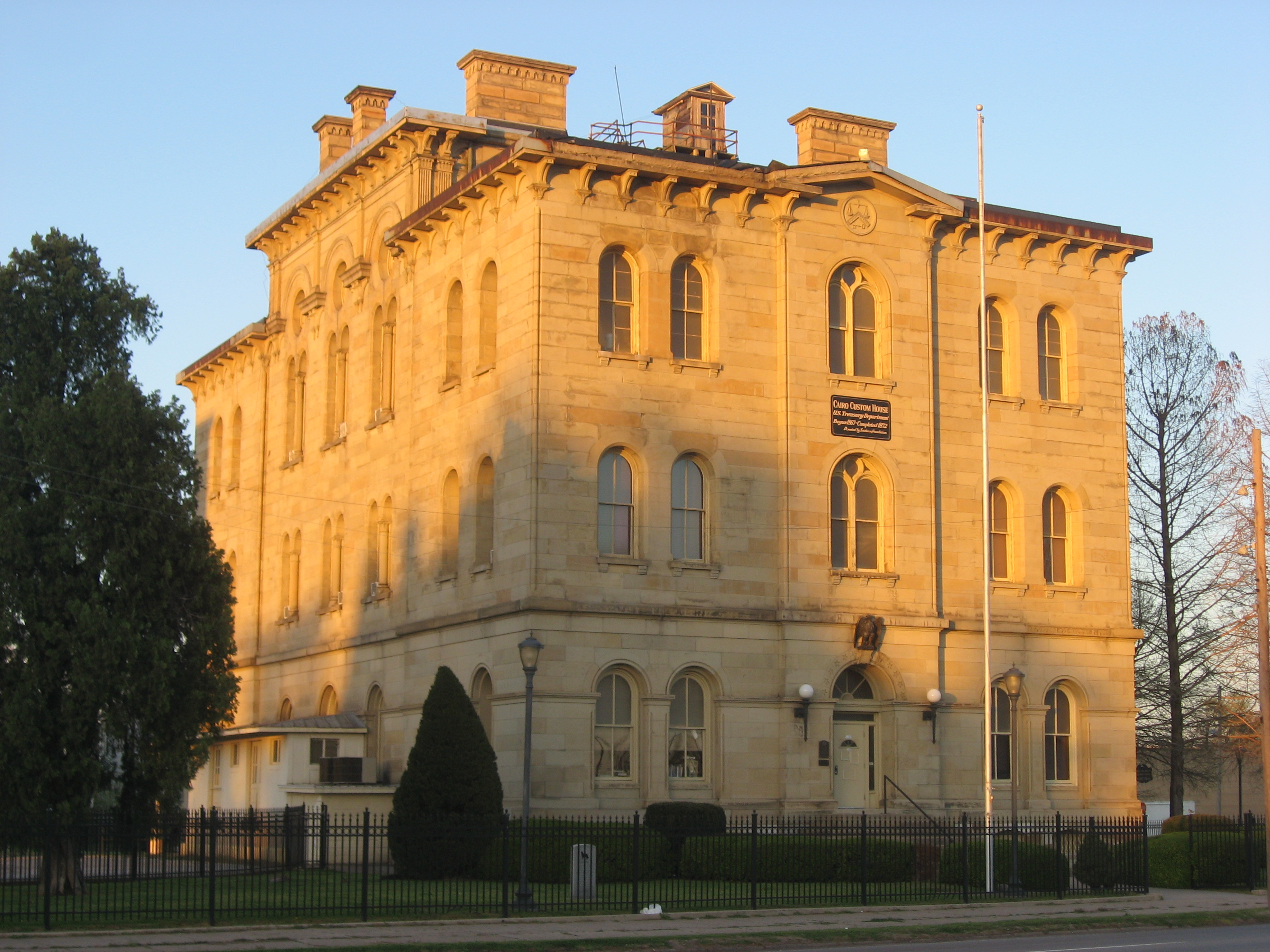
Cairo, Illinois Customs House

City	State	Modern Name or Locale	Era	Historical Name	NHL	NHL/NRHP #	NHL/NRHP Date	Note
Baton Rouge	Louisiana	USS Kidd Veterans Museum	U.S. Coast Guard 1915–Present	USCGC White Alder Memorial	No	N/A	N/A	
Cairo	Illinois	Old Custom House	U.S. Revenue Cutter Service 1790–1915	Cairo Custom House	NRHP	73000689	July 24, 1973	
Chilo	Ohio	Chilo Lock 34 Museum	U.S. Lighthouse Service 1789–1939	USCGC Wakerobin	No	N/A	N/A	Outdoor exhibit with only the Steam Engines on display
Clarksville	Tennessee	Customs House Museum	U.S. Revenue Cutter Service 1790–1915	Clarksville Federal Building	NRHP	72001246	June 13, 1972	
Louisville	Kentucky	Mayor Andrew Broaddus	U.S. Life-Saving Service 1848–1915	Life Saving Station#10	Yes	89001446	June 30, 1989	
Wheeling	West Virginia	West Virginia Independence Hall	U.S. Revenue Cutter Service 1790–1915	Wheeling Customs House	Yes	70000660	June 20, 1988	
Winona	Minnesota	USCGC Winona Monument	U.S. Coast Guard 1915–Present	USCGC Winona	No	N/A	N/A	

=== Mid Atlantic ===
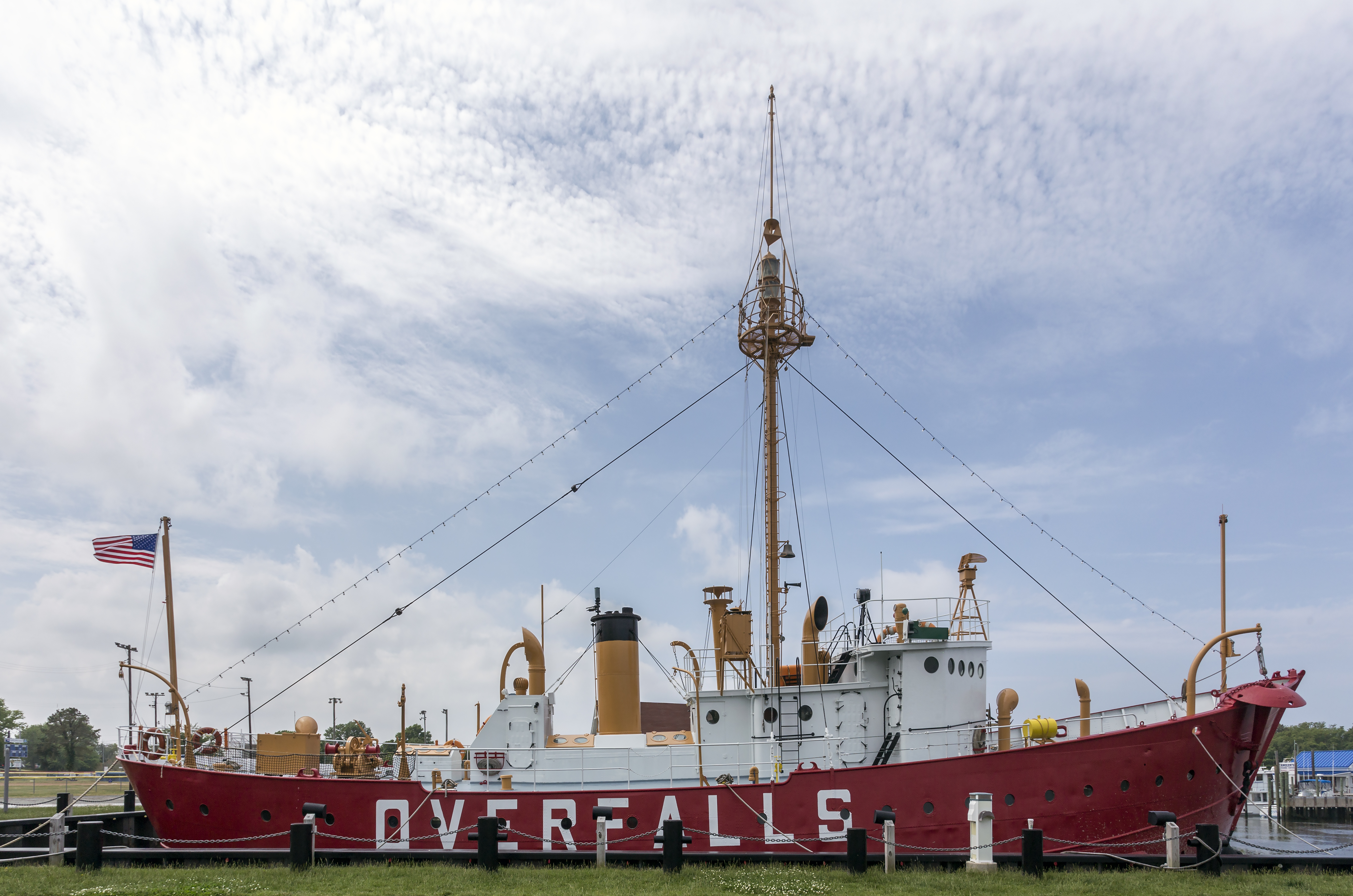
Lightship Overfalls and the 1884 Lewes Life Saving Station are co-located in a city park in Lewes Delaware

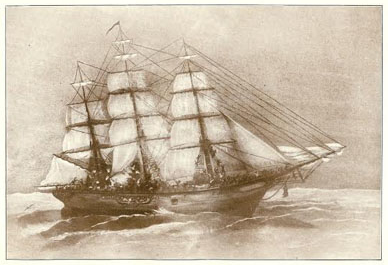
The New Era

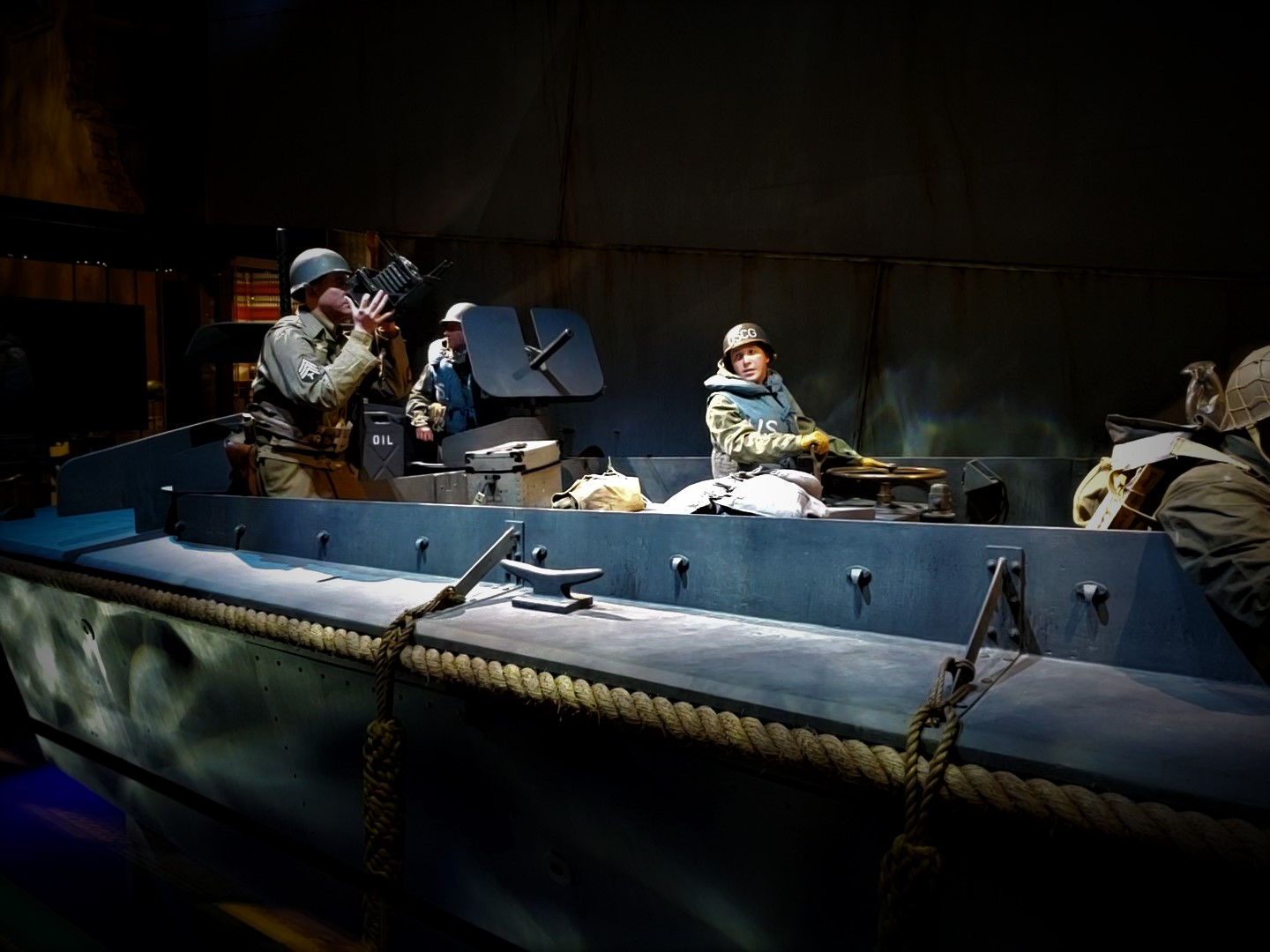
LCVP Coxswain loading troops at Utah Beach

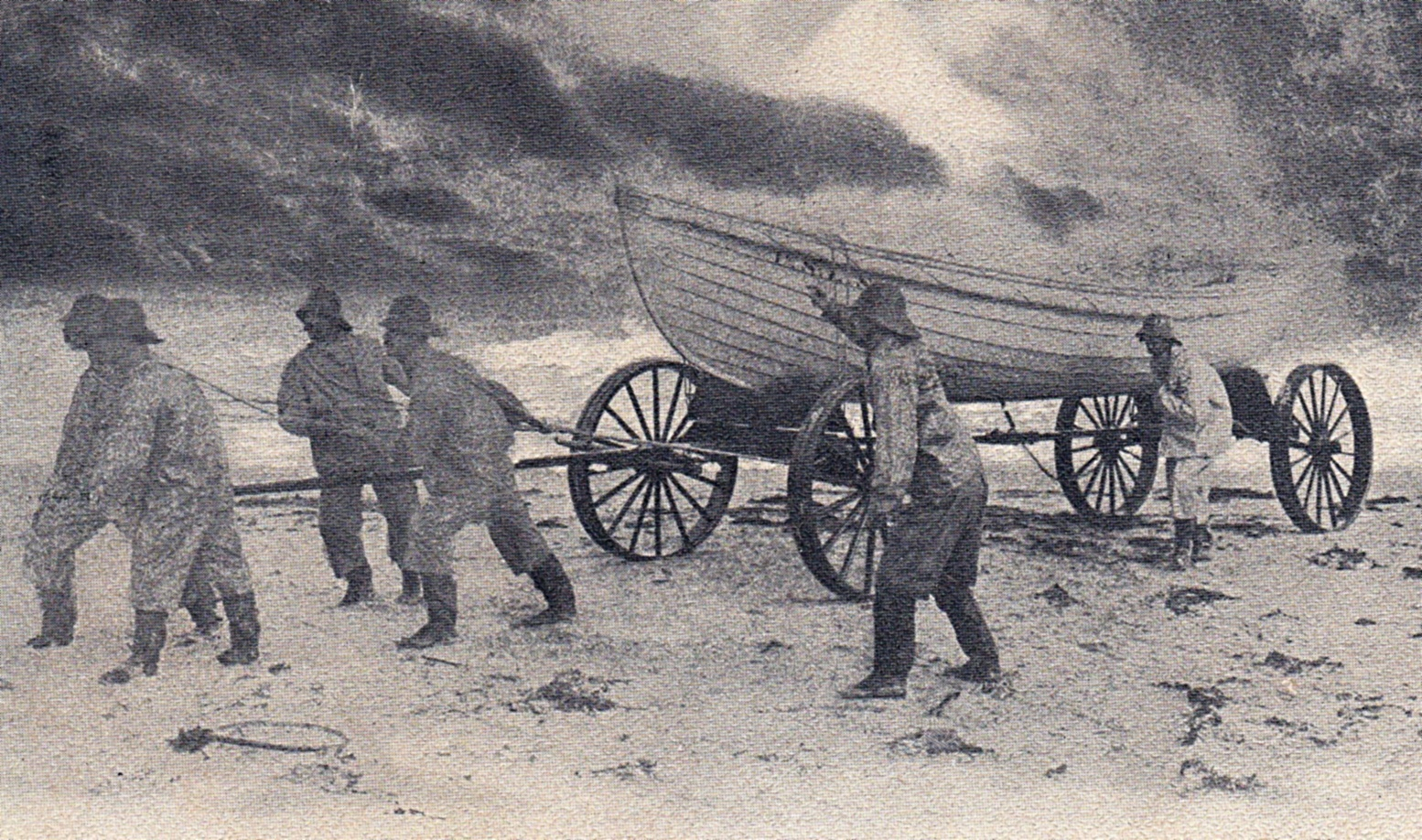
Launching a surfboat

City	State	Modern Name or Locale	Era	Historical Name	NHL	NHL/NRHP #	NHL/NRHP Date	Note
Allenhurst	New Jersey	Borough of Allenhurst, New Jersey	U.S. Life-Saving Service 1848–1915	Borough of Allenhurst, New Jersey	No	N/A	N/A	The town is named for Abner Allen Life Saving Station Keeper
Allenhurst	New Jersey	Church of St. Andrew by the Sea	U.S. Life-Saving Service 1848–1915	New Era	No	N/A	N/A	Outdoor exhibit with the ship's anchor and plaque displayed on the church grounds.
Annapolis	Maryland	Thomas Point Shoals Light Station	U.S. Lighthouse Service 1789–1939	Thomas Point Shoals Light Station	Yes	75000864	January 20, 1999	
Arlington	Virginia	Arlington National Cemetery	U.S. Coast Guard 1915–Present	Coast Guard Memorial	No	N/A	N/A	Also: USS Serpens Memorial and CDR Elmer F. Stone Gravesite
Bald Head	North Carolina	Captain Charlie's Station	U.S. Lighthouse Service 1789–1939	Cape Fear Light	NRHP	78001931	August 29, 1978	Beach Cottages
Baltimore	Maryland	Lightship Chesapeake LV116	U.S. Lighthouse Service 1789–1939	Lightship Chesapeake LV116	Yes	80000349	December 20, 1989	Also: USCGC Taney
Baltimore	Maryland	USCGC Taney	U.S. Coast Guard 1915–Present	USCGC Taney	Yes	88001826	June 7, 1988	Also: Chesapeake Lightship LV116
Rehoboth Beach	Delaware	Delaware Seashore State Park	U.S. Life-Saving Service 1848–1915	Indian River Life Saving Station	NRHP	76000582	September 29, 1976	
Berlin	Maryland	Assateague Island National Seashore	U.S. Life-Saving Service 1848–1915	Popes Island Life Saving Station	No	N/A	N/A	
Buxton	North Carolina	Cape Hatteras National Seashore	U.S. Lighthouse Service 1789–1939	Cape Hatteras Light Station	Yes	78000266	August 5, 1998	
Duck	North Carolina	Life Saving Station	U.S. Life-Saving Service 1848–1915	Caffeys Inlet Lifesaving Station	NRHP	78001942	January 30, 1978	Casual dining on Sanderling Resort
Fort Belvoir	Virginia	National Museum of the United States Army	U.S. Coast Guard 1915–Present	USS Joseph Dickman	No	N/A	N/A	Utah Beach landing depicted in the Global War Gallery
Hatteras	North Carolina	Graveyard of the Atlantic Museum	U.S. Life-Saving Service 1848–1915	Graveyard of the Atlantic Museum	No	N/A	N/A	
Kitty Hawk	North Carolina	Black Pelican Seafood Company	U.S. Life-Saving Service 1848–1915	Kitty Hawk Life-Saving Station Boathouse	No	N/A	N/A	Ocean Front Dining
Kitty Hawk	North Carolina	Kitty Hawk Lifesaving Station #7	U.S. Life-Saving Service 1848–1915	Kitty Hawk Life-Saving Station	NRHP	84000073	November 10, 1984	Beach Cottage
Lewes	Delaware	Canal Front Park and Marina	U.S. Lighthouse Service 1789–1939	Lightship WLV 539	Yes	89000006	June 14, 2011	Also: Lewes Life Saving Station
Longport	New Jersey	Longport Historical Museum	U.S. Coast Guard 1915–Present	Great Egg Coast Guard Station	NRHP	05000128	October 31, 2005	
Manasquan	New Jersey	Squan Beach Life Saving Station	U.S. Life-Saving Service 1848–1915	Squan Beach Life Saving Station#9	NRHP	08000135	March 5, 2008	
Manteo	North Carolina	Collins Park	U.S. Life-Saving Service 1848–1915	Pea Island Cookhouse	No	N/A	N/A	Also: Herbert M. Collins Boathouse and Richard Etheridge statue
Norfolk	Virginia	Fort Norfolk	U.S. Lighthouse Service 1789–1939	Fort Norfolk Lighthouse Depot	NRHP	76002225	October 29, 1976	Used as lighthouse depot during the mid-20th Century
Ocean City	Maryland	Ocean City Life Saving Station Museum	U.S. Life-Saving Service 1848–1915	Ocean City Life Saving Station	No	N/A	N/A	
Ocean City	New Jersey	U.S. Life Saving Station 30	U.S. Life-Saving Service 1848–1915	Ocean City Life Saving Station	NRHP	13000385	June 14, 2013	
Ocracoke	North Carolina	Ocracoke Preservation Society	U.S. Coast Guard 1915–Present	Ocracoke Village	NRHP	90001465	September 28, 1990	Numerous maritime and Coast Guard sites within the Ocracoke Historic District. The former Coast Guard Station is not open to the public.
Portsmouth	North Carolina	Cape Lookout National Seashore	U.S. Life-Saving Service 1848–1915	Portsmouth Life Saving Station	NRHP	78000267	November 29, 1978	
Portsmouth	Virginia	Lightship Portsmouth	U.S. Lighthouse Service 1789–1939	Lightship Portsmouth LV101	Yes	89001080	May 5, 1989	
Rodanthe	North Carolina	Chicamacomico Life-Saving Station Historic Site and Museum	U.S. Life-Saving Service 1848–1915	Chicamacomico Life Saving Station	NRHP	76000164	December 12, 1976	
Seaside Park	New Jersey	Coast Guard Station Trail	U.S. Life-Saving Service 1848–1915	U.S. Life Saving Station Station No. 14	NRHP	78001789	January 30, 1978	A short dune trail in Island Beach State Park near the historic life saving station, however, the station is not open to the public.
Stone Harbor Borough	New Jersey	Steven C. Ludlum American Legion Post 331	U.S. Life-Saving Service 1848–1915	U.S. Life-Saving Station No. 35	NRHP	08000970	October 8, 2008	Museum operated by the American Legion
Virginia Beach	Virginia	Cape Henry Lighthouse	U.S. Lighthouse Service 1789–1939	Cape Henry Lighthouse	Yes	66000910	January 29, 1964	Located on Joint Expeditionary Base Fort Story, however the lighthouse is open accessible to the general public
Virginia Beach	Virginia	Virginia Beach Surf and Rescue Museum	U.S. Life-Saving Service 1848–1915	Seatack Life Saving Station	NRHP	79003304	July 11, 1979	
Washington	District of Columbia	Treasury Building	U.S. Revenue Cutter Service 1790–1915	Treasury Building	Yes	71001007	November 11, 1971	Tours available

=== Southeast ===
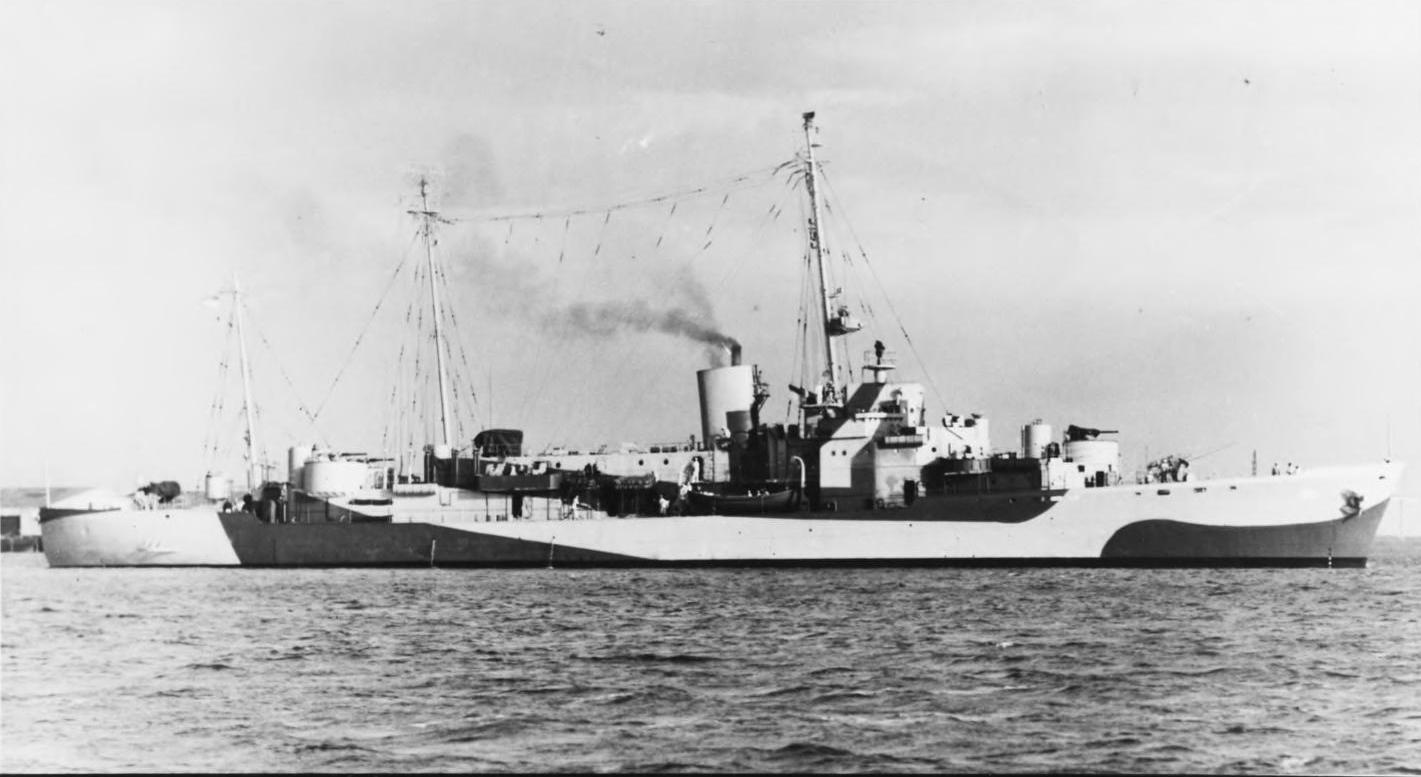
USCGC Ingham, 1944

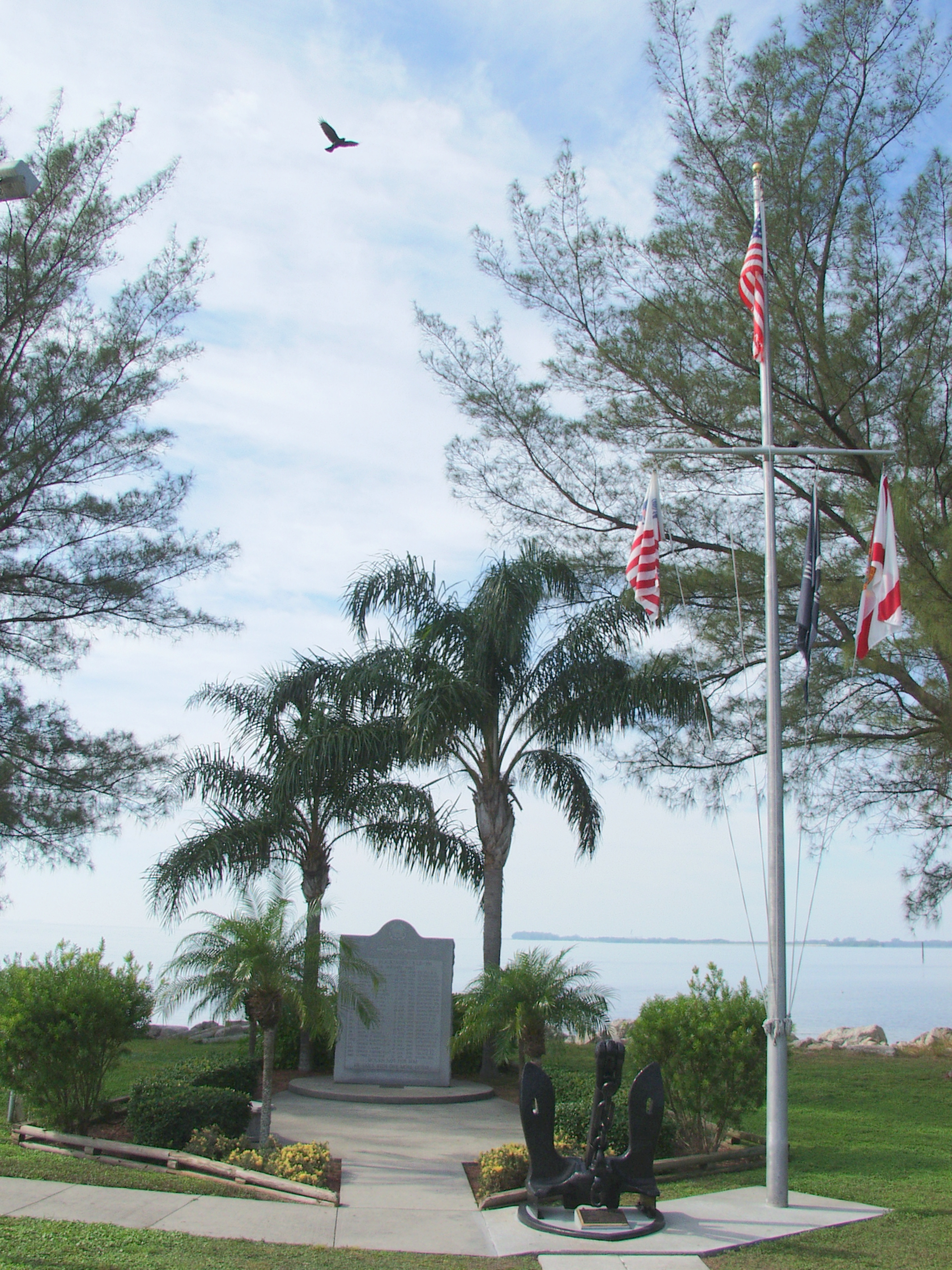
USCGC Blackthorn Memorial

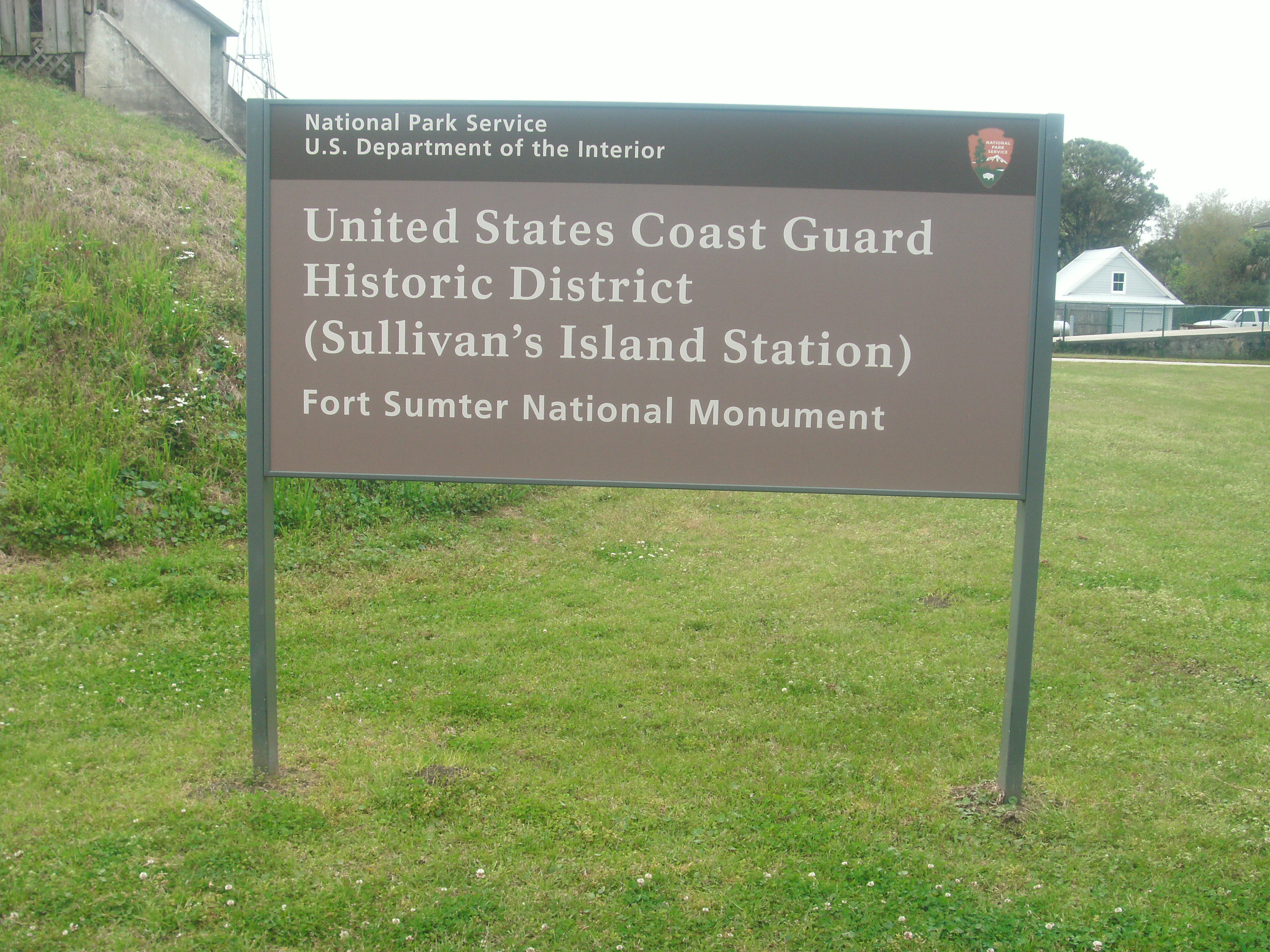
Sullivan's Island, Charleston, South Carolina

City	State	Modern Name or Locale	Era	Historical Name	NHL	NHL/NRHP #	NHL/NRHP Date	Note
Key West	Florida	Key West Museum of Art and History at the Custom House	U.S. Revenue Cutter Service 1790–1915	Key West Post Office and Customshouse	NRHP	73000587	September 20, 1973	Also: U.S. Coast Guard Headquarters, Key West Station
Key West	Florida	The Shops at Mallory Square	U.S. Lighthouse Service 1789–1939	U.S. Coast Guard Headquarters, Key West Station	NRHP	73000590	October 15, 1973	Also: Key West Post Office and Customshouse
Key West	Florida	USCGC Ingham	U.S. Coast Guard 1915–Present	USCGC Ingham	Yes	92001879	April 27, 1992	
Ponce de Leon Inlet	Florida	Ponce Inlet Lighthouse and Museum	U.S. Lighthouse Service 1789–1939	Ponce Inlet Light Station	Yes	72000355	August 5, 1998	
St. Simon's Island	Georgia	World War II Home Front Museum	U.S. Coast Guard 1915–Present	US Coast Guard Station—St. Simons Island	NRHP	98000297	April 1, 1998	Also: Coast Guard/East Beach Park
Stuart	Florida	House of Refuge at Gilbert's Bar	U.S. Life-Saving Service 1848–1915	House of Refuge at Gilbert's Bar	NRHP	74000651	May 3, 1974	
Sullivan's Island	South Carolina	US Coast Guard Historic District	U.S. Life-Saving Service 1848–1915	Sullivan's Island Life Saving Station	NRHP	73001703	June 19, 1973	Also: Charleston Light
Tampa	Florida	Sunshine Skyway Bridge	U.S. Coast Guard 1915–Present	USCGC Blackthorn	No	N/A	N/A	Located in the Pinellas County Sunshine Skyway Rest Area

=== Gulf of Mexico ===
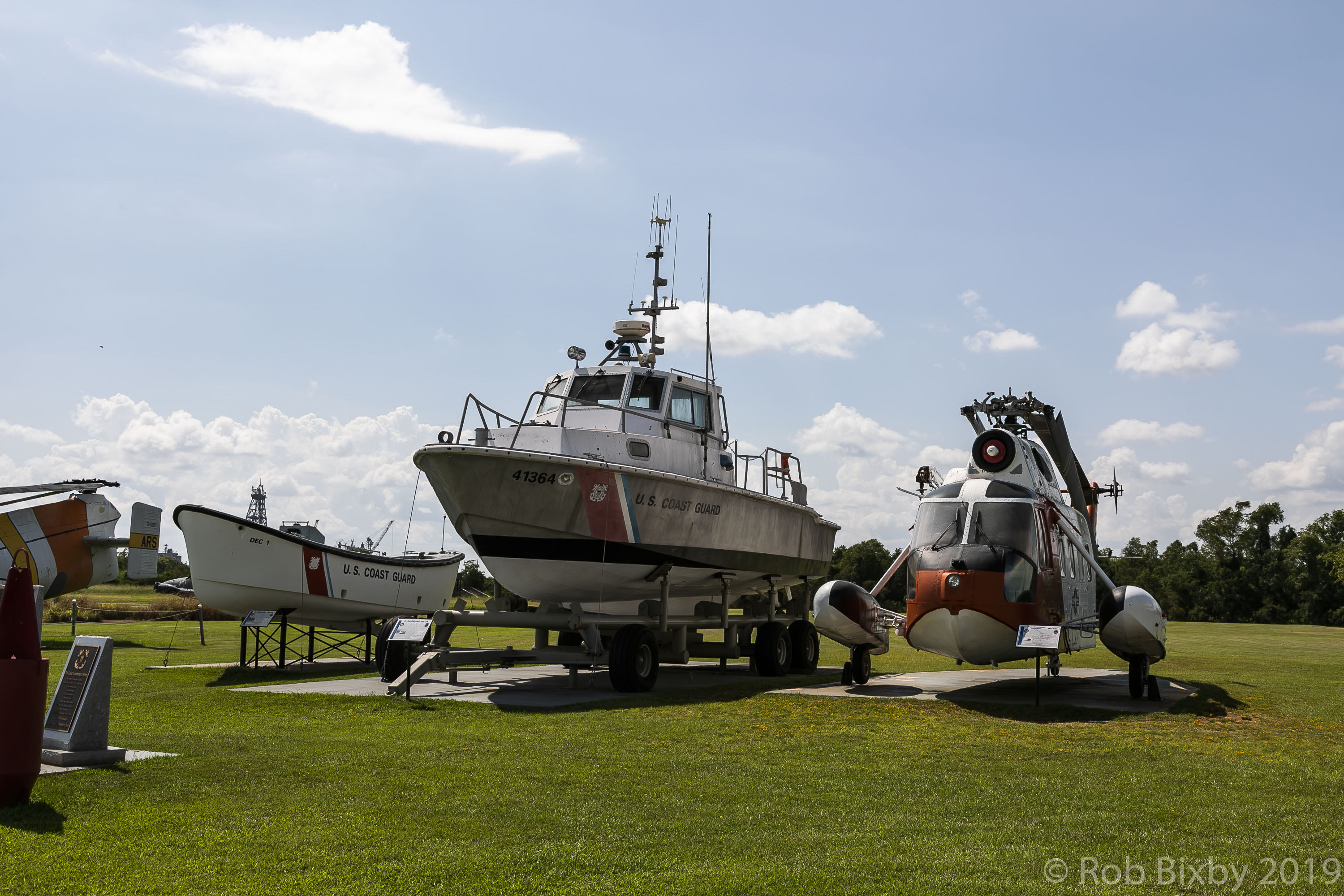
Fallen Guardians Monument, Mobile, Alabama

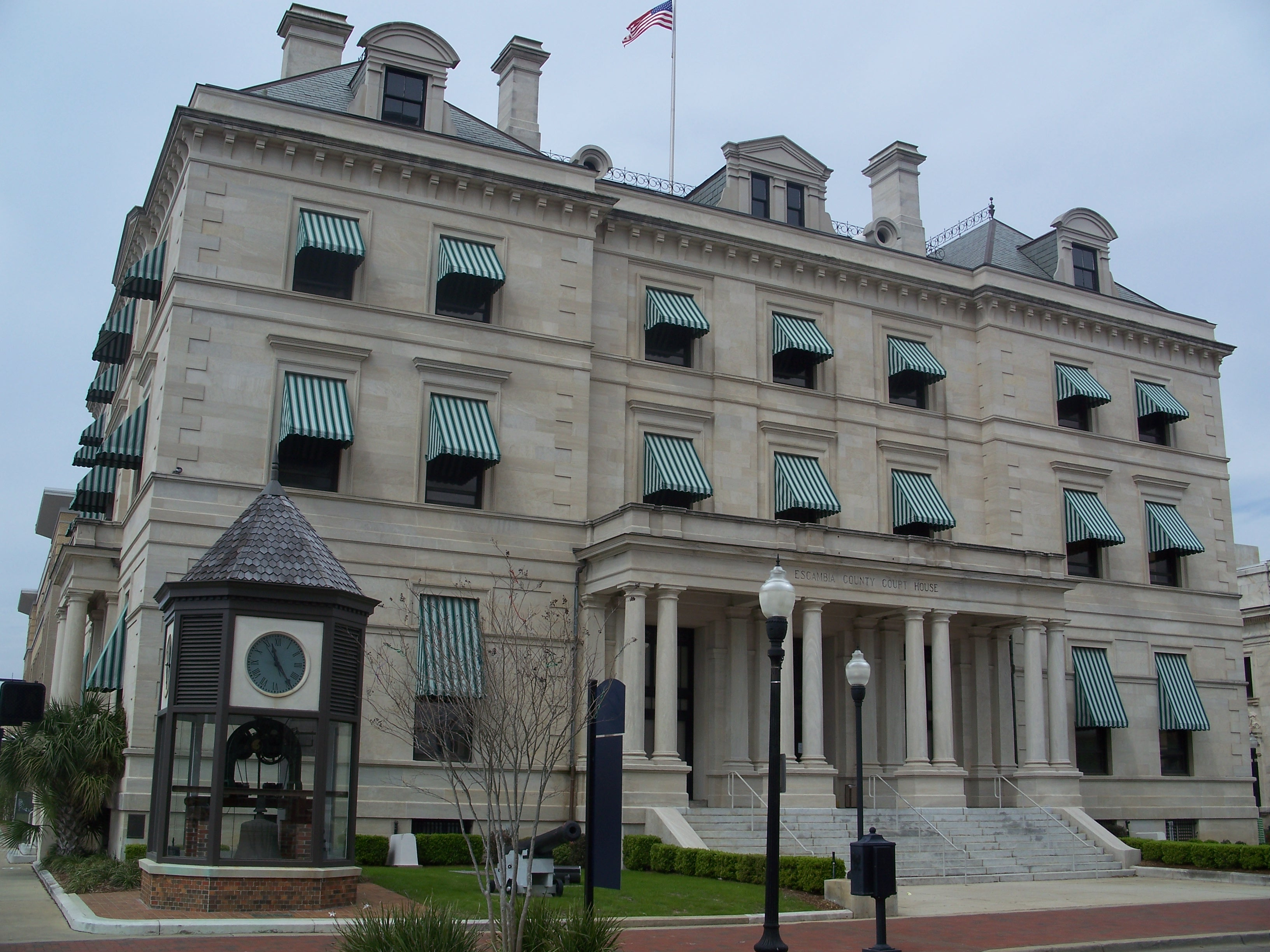
Pensacola Customs House

City	State	Modern Name or Locale	Era	Historical Name	NHL	NHL/NRHP #	NHL/NRHP Date	Note
Mobile	Alabama	Cooper Riverside Park	U.S. Coast Guard 1915–Present	U.S. Coast Guard Monument	No	N/A	N/A	
Mobile	Alabama	USS Alabama Battleship Memorial Park	U.S. Coast Guard 1915–Present	The Fallen Guardians Monument	No	N/A	N/A	Also: Grumman HU-16E Albatross: 2129
Pensacola	Florida	Artel Gallery	U.S. Revenue Cutter Service 1790–1915	US Customs House and Post Office	NRHP	97000659	July 22, 1997	

=== Great Lakes ===
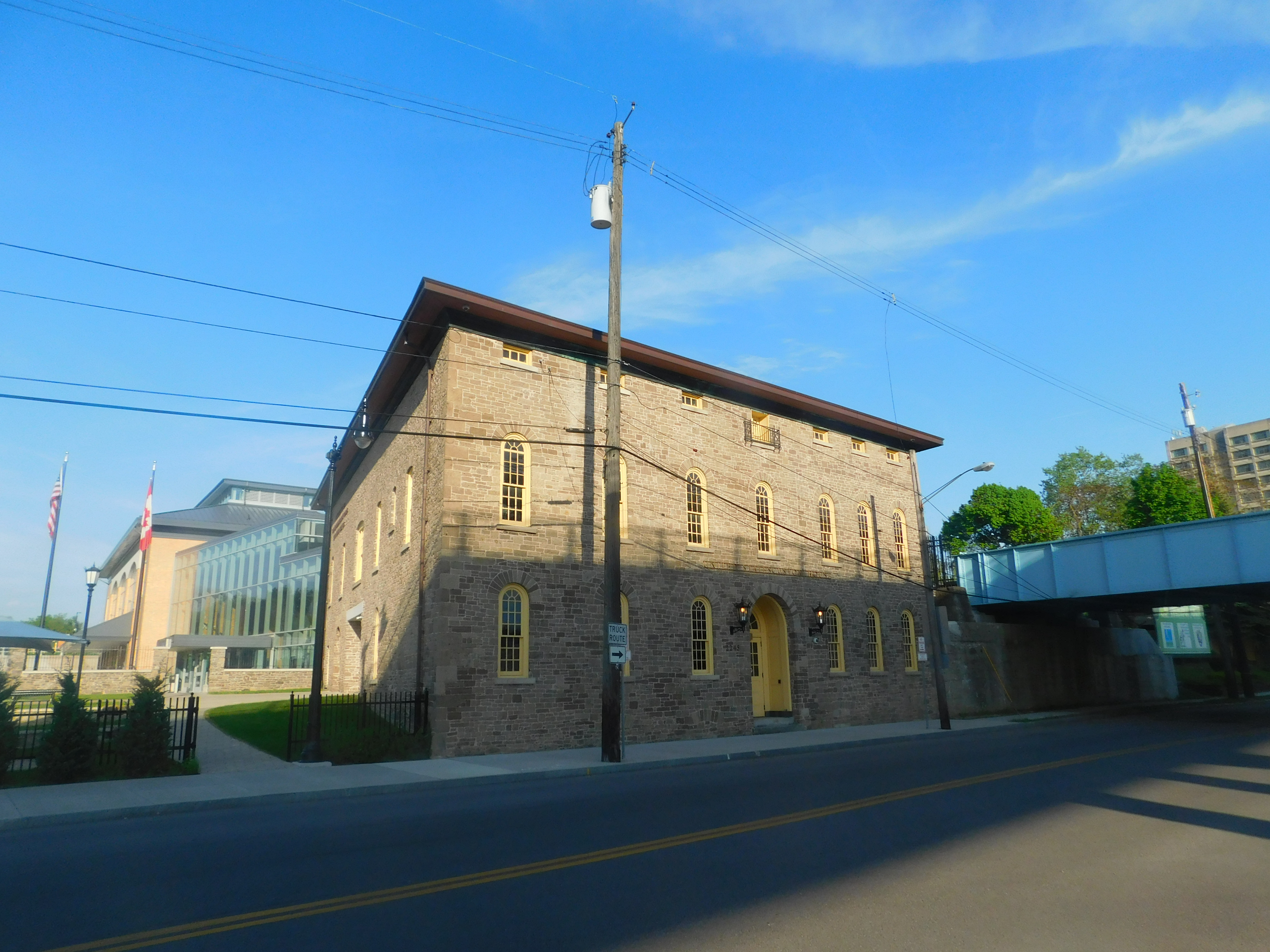
Niagara Falls Custom House is now an Underground Railroad Museum

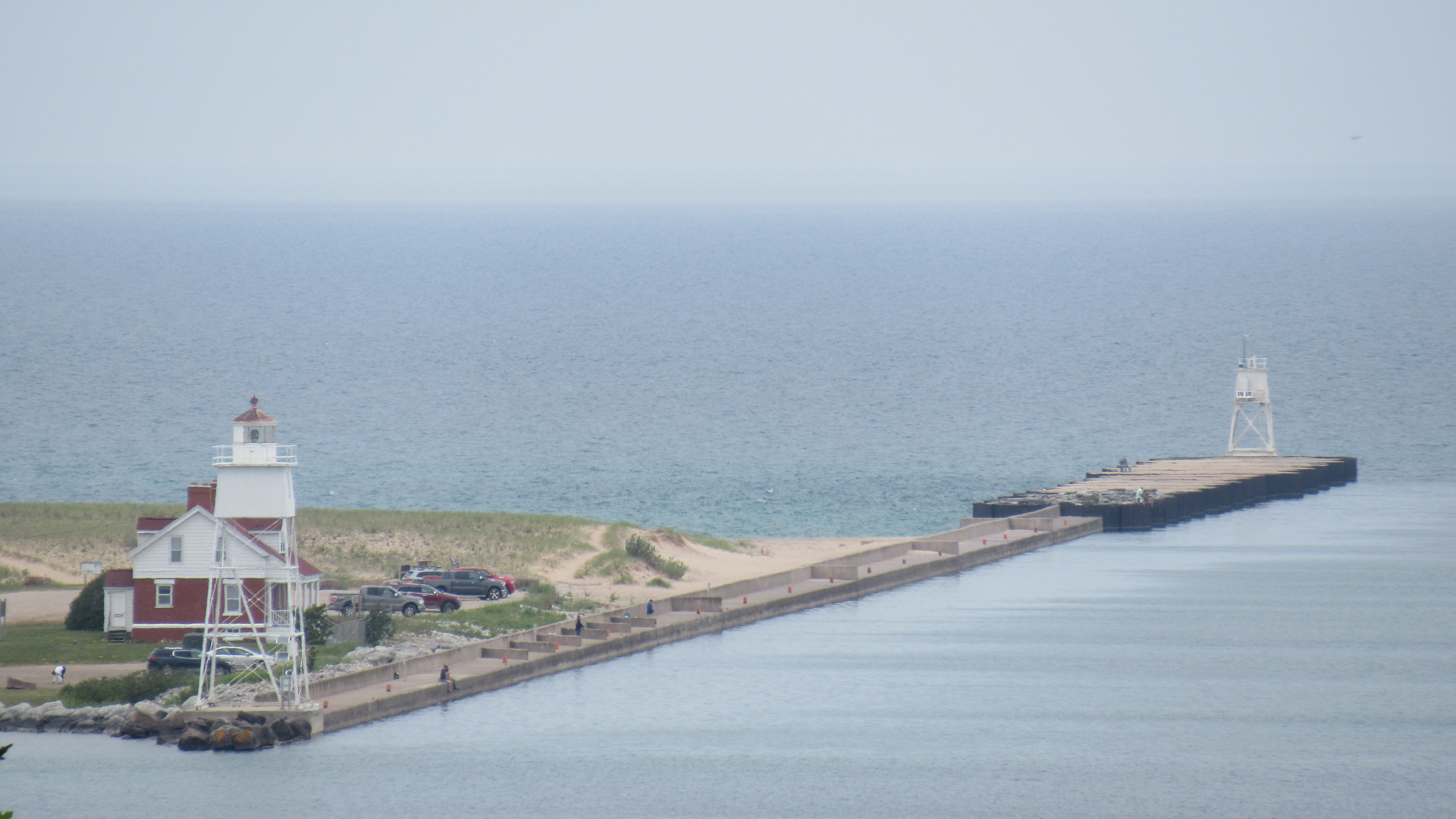
Michigan's Grand Marais Harbor of Refuge entrance range lights and museum.

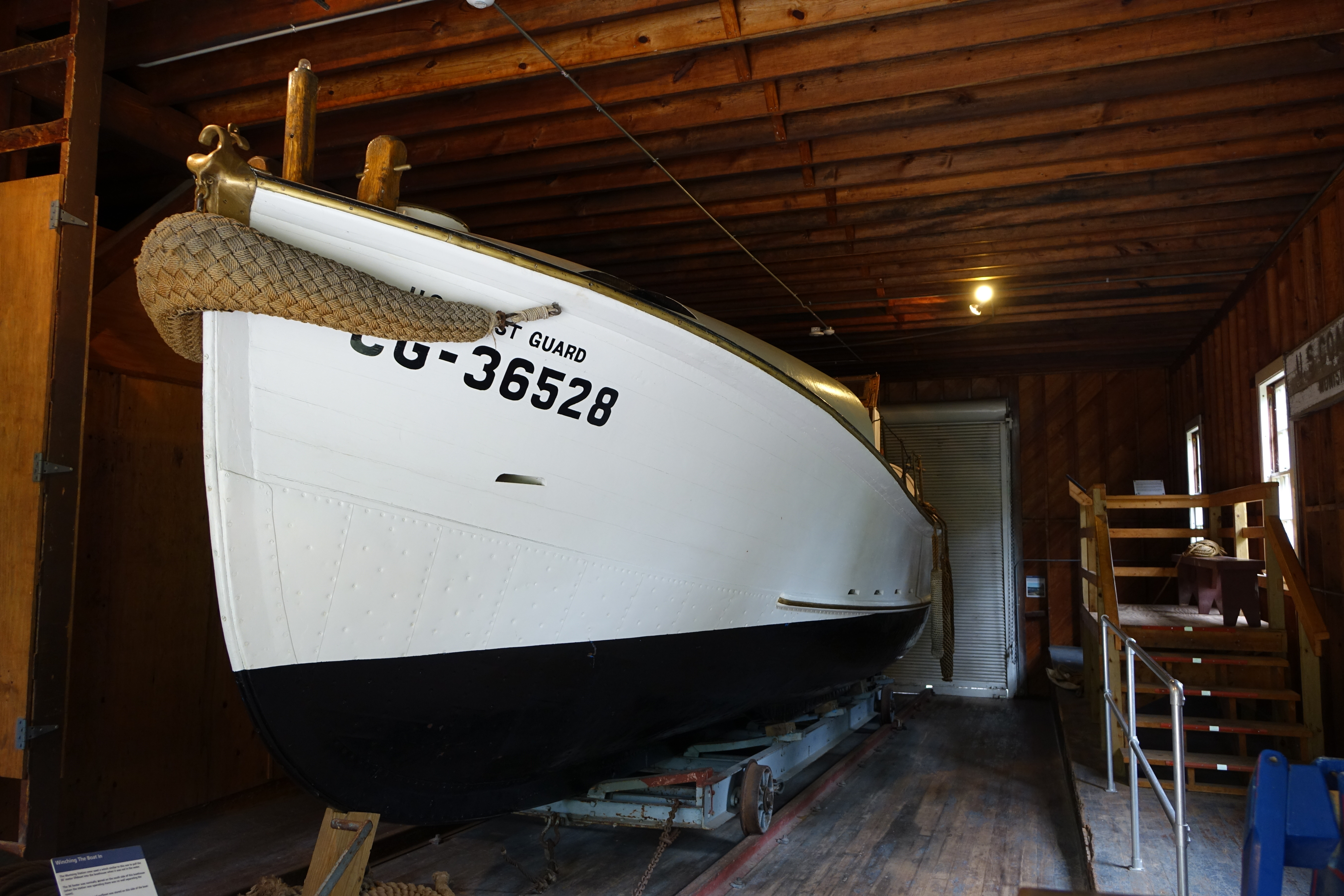
Munising Michigan

Man in Rigging painting, 1918, by Anton Otto Fischer

City	State	Modern Name or Locale	Era	Historical Name	NHL	NHL/NRHP #	NHL/NRHP Date	Note
Ashtabula	Ohio	Ashtabula Maritime and Surface Transportation Museum	U.S. Lighthouse Service 1789–1939	Ashtabula Lighthouse Keeper's House	No	N/A	N/A	
Ashtabula	Ohio	Harbor Yak Outfitters	U.S. Coast Guard 1915–Present	Ashtabula Coast Guard Station	No	No	N/A	Outdoor Adventure – Canoe and Kayak Rental
Cleveland	Ohio	Cleveland Coast Guard Station	U.S. Coast Guard 1915–Present	Cleveland Coast Guard Station	NRHP	76001390	January 1, 1976	City Park
Douglas	Michigan	Old School House Museum	U.S. Life-Saving Service 1848–1915	Francis Metallic Surfboat	NRHP	15000156	April 20, 2015	
Duluth	Minnesota	USCGC Sundew	U.S. Coast Guard 1915–Present	USCGC Sundew	No	N/A	N/A	
Eagle Harbor	Michigan	Eagle Harbor Life Saving Museum	U.S. Life-Saving Service 1848–1915	Eagle Harbor Life Saving Station	NRHP	12000306	August 16, 2012	
Elberta	Michigan	Elberta Life Saving Station	U.S. Life-Saving Service 1848–1915	Frankfort Life Saving Station	No	N/A	N/A	Now a special event venue, located on Betsie Lake south of the harbor mouth; also Oliver Art Center
Erie	Pennsylvania	Erie Art Museum	U.S. Revenue Cutter Service 1790–1915	Erie Customs House	NRHP	72001122	January 13, 1972	
Evanston	Illinois	Lighthouse Landing Park	U.S. Lighthouse Service 1789–1939	Grosse Point Light Station	Yes	76000707	January 20, 1999	
Frankfort	Michigan	Oliver Art Center	U.S. Coast Guard 1915–Present	Frankfort Life Saving Station	No	N/A	N/A	Located on Betsie Lake north of the harbor mouth; also Elberta Life Saving Station
Ferrysburg	Michigan	Coast Guard Park	U.S. Coast Guard 1915–Present	Coast Guard Park	No	N/A	N/A	
Glen Haven	Michigan	Glen Haven Cannery Boathouse	U.S. Coast Guard 1915–Present	36 Foot MLB	No	N/A	N/A	Unknown Hull Number
Glen Haven	Michigan	Sleeping Bear Point Coast Guard Station Maritime Museum	U.S. Life-Saving Service 1848–1915	Sleeping Bear Point Life Saving Station	NRHP	79000285	April 26, 1979	
Grand Haven	Michigan	Escanaba Park	U.S. Coast Guard 1915–Present	Escanaba Park	No	N/A	N/A	
Grand Marais	Michigan	Lightkeeper's Museum	U.S. Lighthouse Service 1789–1939	Grand Marais Harbor of Refuge	No	N/A	N/A	
Grand Marais	Minnesota	Cook County History Museum	U.S. Lighthouse Service 1789–1939	Lightkeeper's House	NRHP	78001528	November 28, 1978	
Ludington	Michigan	Port of Ludington Maritime Museum	U.S. Coast Guard 1915–Present	Ludington Coast Guard Station	NRHP	10000264	May 17, 2010	
Mackinaw City	Michigan	USCGC Mackinaw	U.S. Coast Guard 1915–Present	USCGC Mackinaw	No	N/A	N/A	
Manistee	Michigan	USCGC Acacia	U.S. Coast Guard 1915–Present	USCGC Acacia	No	N/A	N/A	Part of S.S. City of Milwaukee and USCGC Acacia Museum
Marblehead	Ohio	The Keeper's House Museum	U.S. Lighthouse Service 1789–1939	Benajah Wolcott House	NRHP	91000251	March 14, 1991	
Marblehead	Ohio	Lucien Clemons Park	U.S. Life-Saving Service 1848–1915	Marblehead Life Saving Station	No	N/A	N/A	
Marblehead	Ohio	Marblehead Lighthouse State Park	U.S. Life-Saving Service 1848–1915	Marblehead Life Saving Station	No	N/A	N/A	Boathouse replica; also: Marblehead Lighthouse
Munising	Michigan	Pictured Rock National Lakeshore	U.S. Coast Guard 1915–Present	Munising Coast Guard Station	No	N/A	N/A	CG-36528
Muskegon	Michigan	USS Silversides Submarine Museum	U.S. Coast Guard 1915–Present	USCGC McLane	No	N/A	N/A	
Northbrooke	Illinois	Coast Guard Park	U.S. Coast Guard 1915–Present	Coast Guard Park	No	N/A	N/A	
Niagara Falls	New York	Niagara Falls Underground Railroad Heritage Center	U.S. Revenue Cutter Service 1790–1915	Niagara Falls Custom House	NRHP	73001227	July 16, 1973	
Port Hope	Michigan	Lighthouse County Park	U.S. Life-Saving Service 1848–1915	Pointe Aux Barques Life Saving Station	No	N/A	N/A	Also: Pointe Aux Barques Lighthouse
Port Huron	Michigan	Huron Lightship Museum	U.S. Lighthouse Service 1789–1939	Lightship Huron LV103	Yes	76001974	December 20, 1989	
Shelldrake	Michigan	Great Lakes Shipwreck Museum	U.S. Lighthouse Service 1789–1939	Whitefish Point	NRHP	73000947	February 28, 1973	Whitefish Point Lighthouse and Whitefish Point Coast Guard Station are co-located
Sturgeon Bay	Wisconsin	Sturgeon Bay Ship Canal	U.S. Coast Guard 1915–Present	Door County Maritime Museum	No	N/A	N/A	Also: Sturgeon Bay Waterfront History Walk
Sturgeon Bay	Wisconsin	Sawyer Park	U.S. Coast Guard 1915–Present	Sturgeon Bay Waterfront History Walk	No	N/A	N/A	Also: Door County Maritime Museum
South Haven	Michigan	Michigan Maritime Museum	U.S. Coast Guard 1915–Present	CG-36504	No	N/A	N/A	Also: CG-36460 and Pulling Surfboat
Two Harbors	Minnesota	Split Rock Lighthouse State Park	U.S. Lighthouse Service 1789–1939	Split Rock Light Station	Yes	69000073	June 23, 2011	
Washington	Wisconsin	Plum Island	U.S. Life-Saving Service 1848–1915	Plum island Life-Saving Station	NRHP	10000385	June 24, 2010	Also: Plum Island Light Station

== Pacific ==
=== California ===
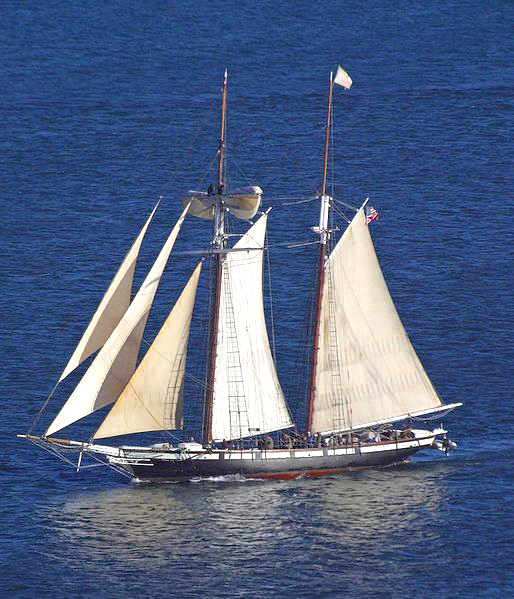
Schooner Californian is the Official Ship of the State of California, it is a replica of the Revenue Cutter C.W. Lawrence, built in 1984

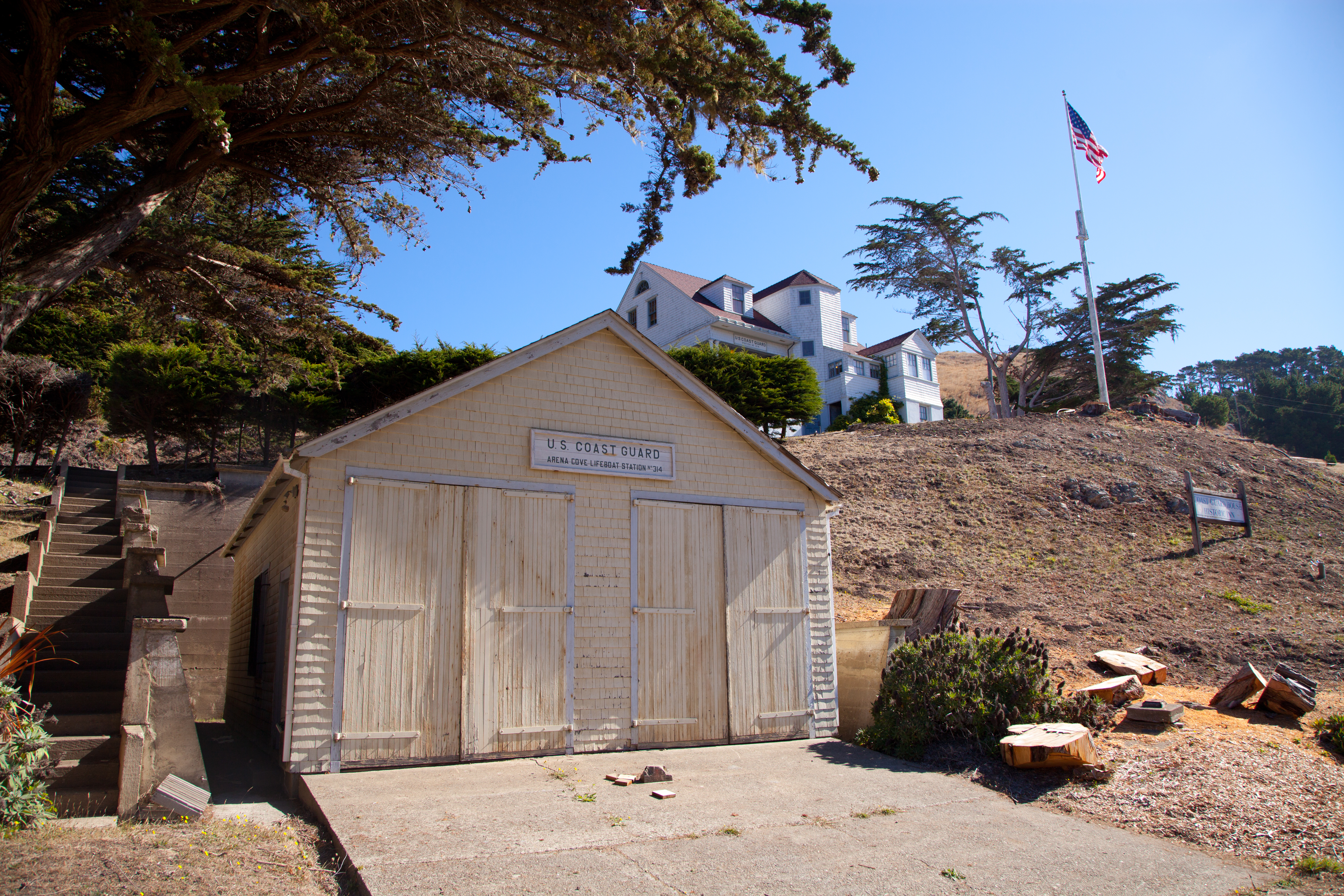
Arena Cove Life Saving Station

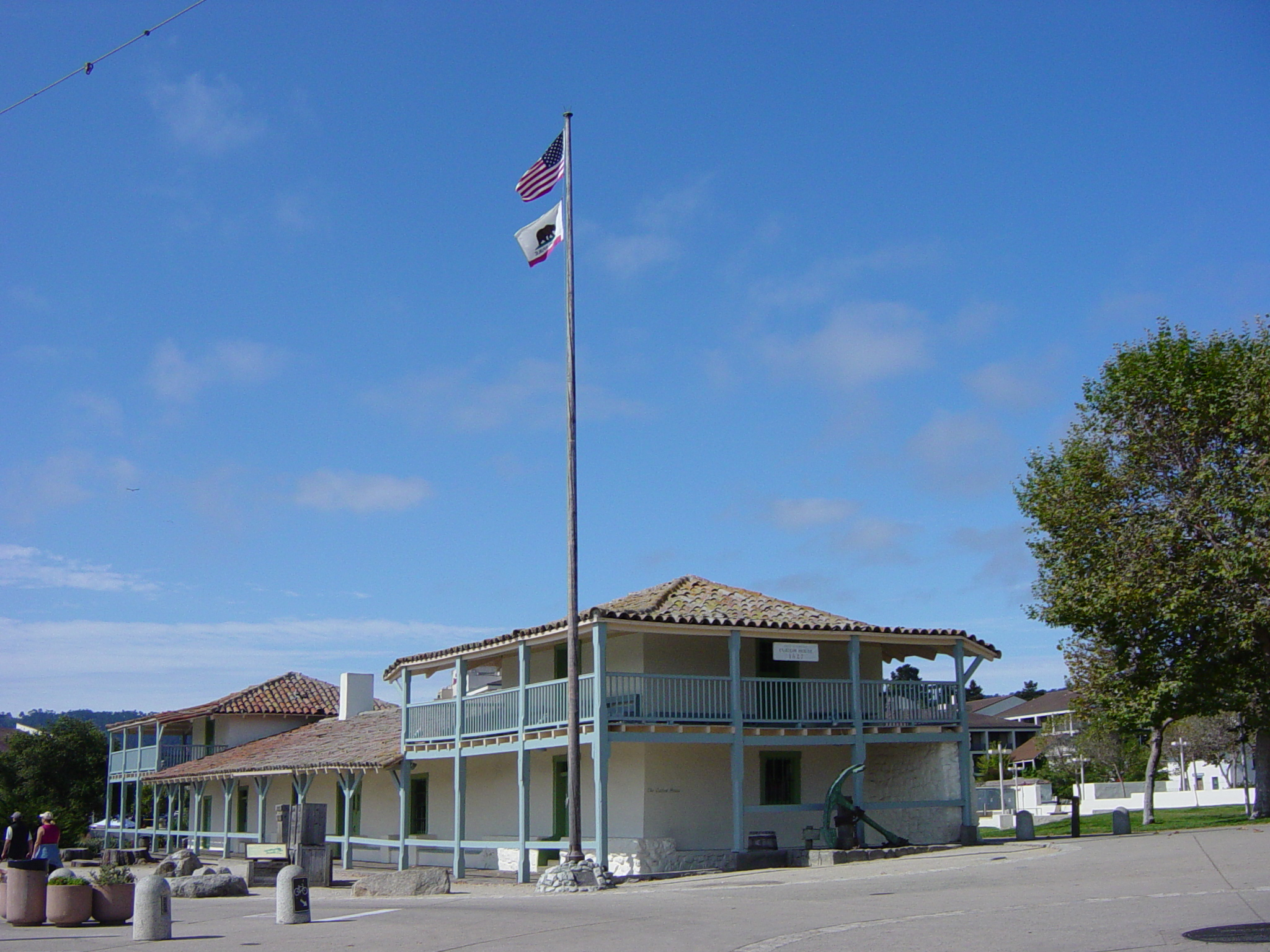
Monterey Custom House

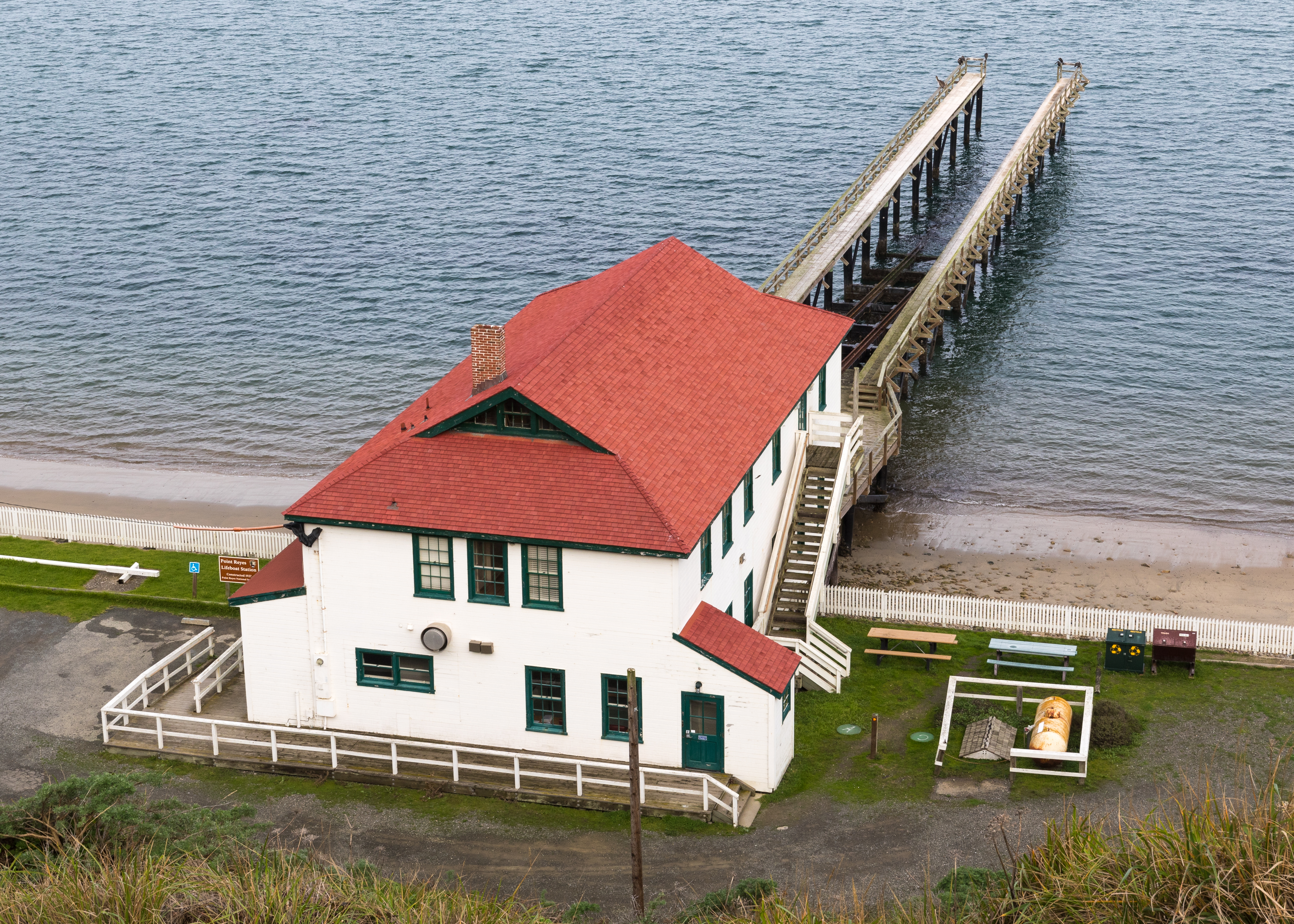
Point Reyes Lifeboat Station

City	State	Modern Name or Locale	Era	Historical Name	NHL	NHL/NRHP #	NHL/NRHP Date	Note
Eureka	California	Coast Guard Plaza	U.S. Coast Guard 1915–Present	Coast Guard Plaza	No	N/A	N/A	
Inverness	California	Point Reyes National Seashore	U.S. Coast Guard 1915–Present	Point Reyes Lifeboat Station	Yes	85002756	December 20, 1989	
Monterey	California	Coast Guard Station Monterey	U.S. Coast Guard 1915–Present	Coast Guard Pier	No	N/A	N/A	Open to Public
Monterey	California	Monterey State Historic Park	U.S. Revenue Cutter Service 1790–1915	Monterey Custom House	Yes	66000217	December 19, 1960	
Morro Bay	California	Morro Bay Maritime Museum	U.S. Coast Guard 1915–Present	CG-30615	No	N/A	N/A	
Oakland	California	Oakland Ferry Terminal	U.S. Coast Guard 1915–Present	Lightship Relief WLV-605	Yes	89002462	December 20, 1989	Also USS Potomac
Oakland	California	USS Potomac	U.S. Coast Guard 1915–Present	USCGC Electra	Yes	87000068	December 14, 1990	Also Lightship Relief WLV-605
Point Arena	California	Coast Guard House Historic Inn and Cottages	U.S. Life-Saving Service 1848–1915	Arena Cove Life Saving Station	NRHP	90001363	September 13, 1990	
Samoa	California	Humboldt Bay Maritime Museum	U.S. Coast Guard 1915–Present	CG-36515	No	N/A	N/A	The hull is located at Coast Guard Station Humboldt Bay
San Diego	California	Californian	U.S. Revenue Cutter Service 1790–1915	USRC C.W. Lawrence	No	N/A	N/A	Replica, in Maritime Museum of San Diego
San Francisco	California	Greater Farallones National Marine Sanctuary Visitor Center	U.S. Life-Saving Service 1848–1915	U.S. Coast Guard Station Fort Point	Yes	66000232	June 13, 1962	
Shelter Cove	California	Mal Coombs Park	U.S. Coast Guard 1915–Present	CG-6541 Monument	No	N/A	N/A	Also: Cape Mendocino Light

=== Pacific Northwest ===
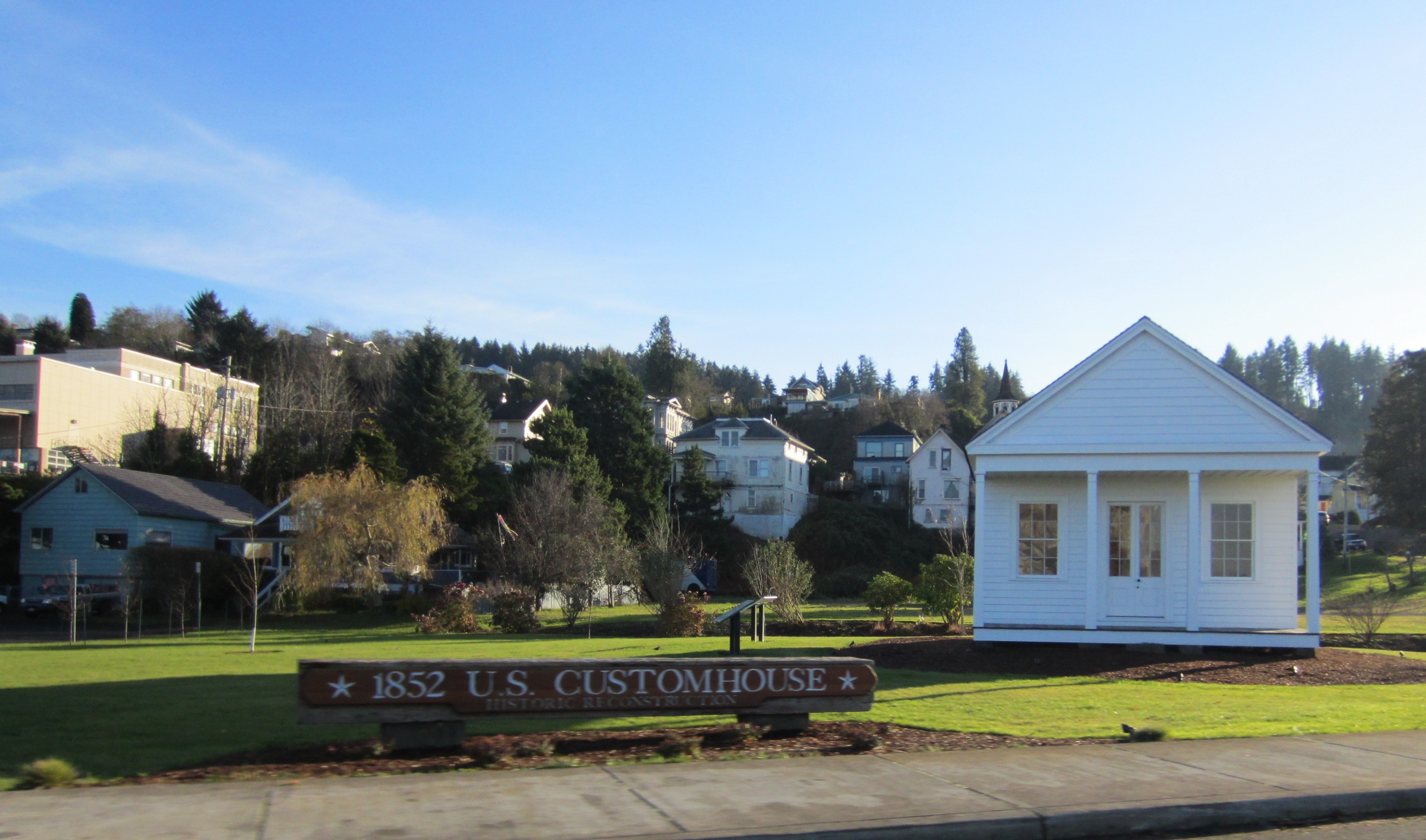
Astoria replica 1852 Custom House

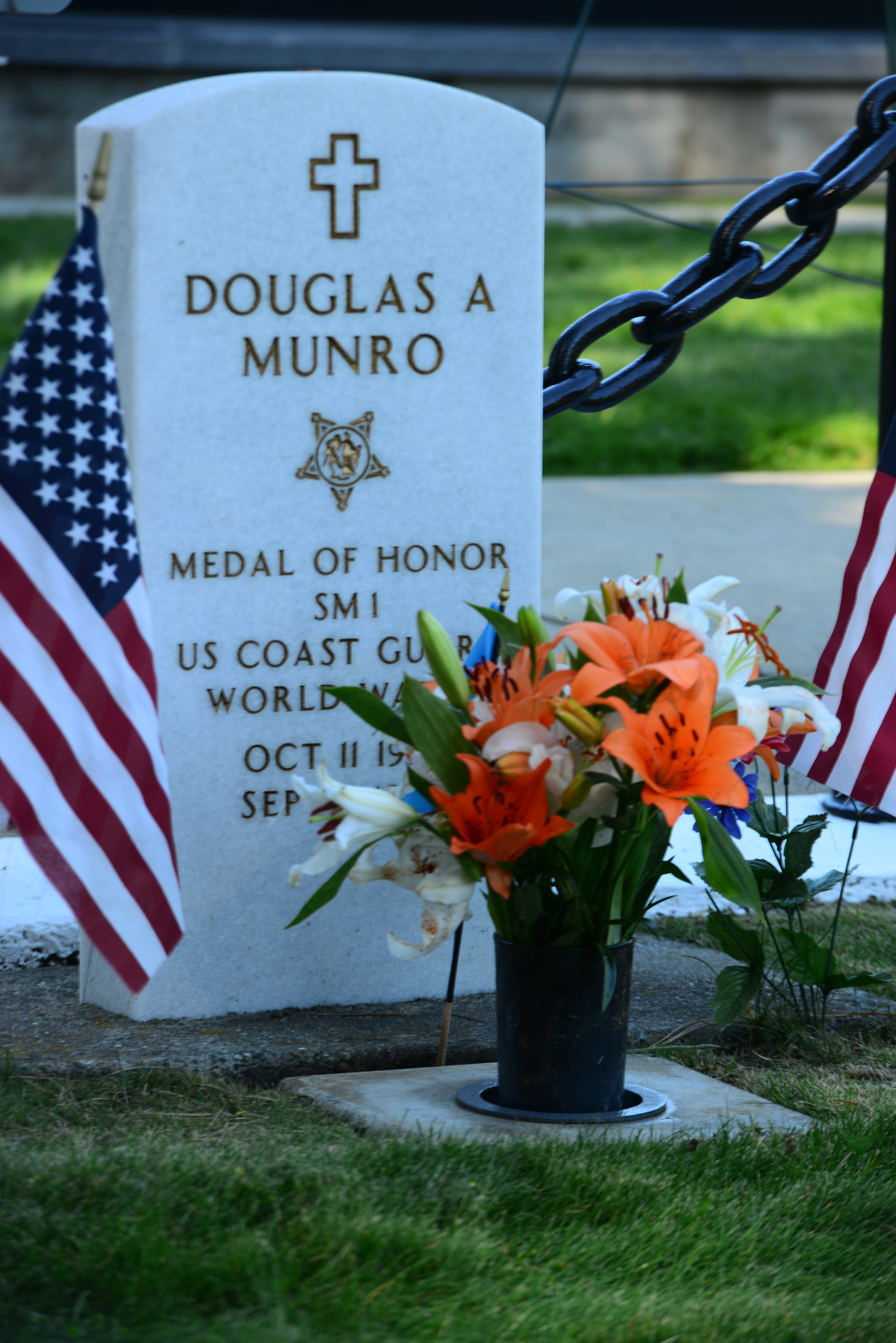
Munro Gravesite

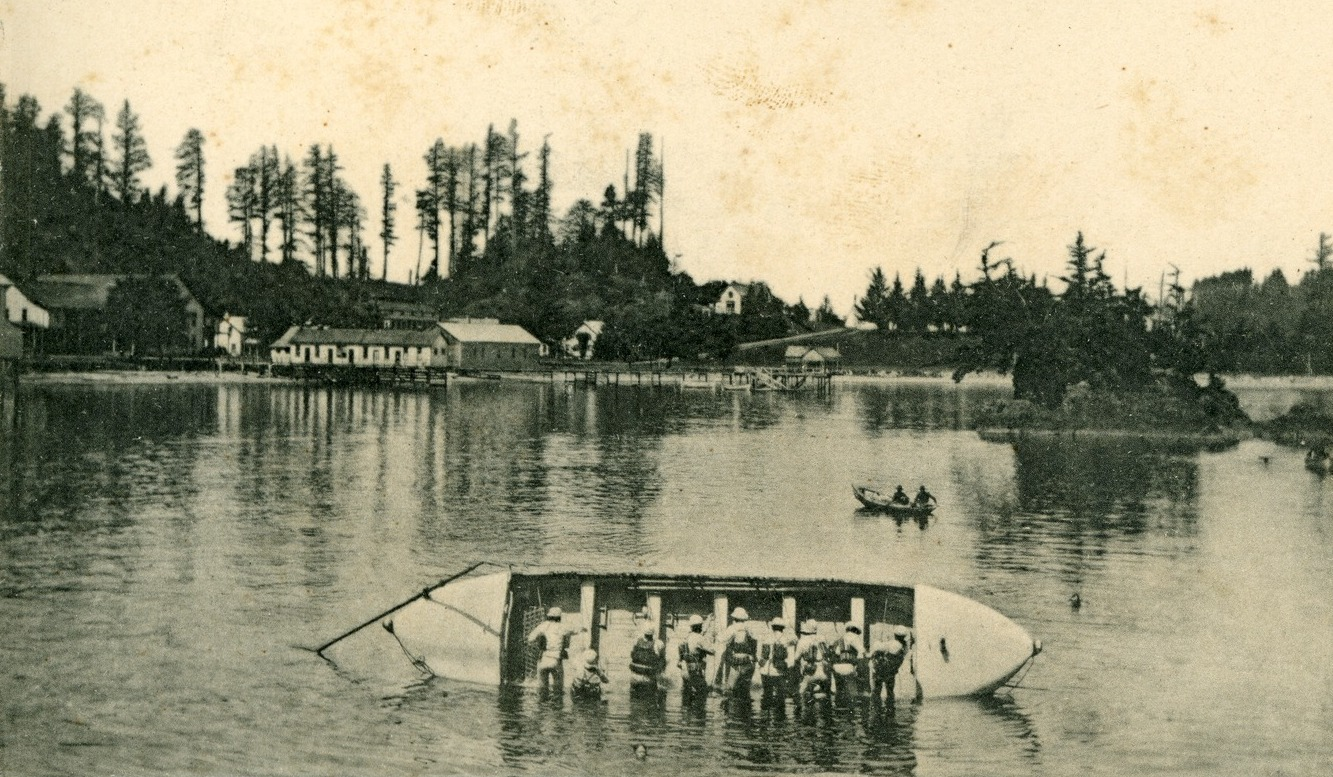
Life saving Drills at Cape Disappointment, 1906

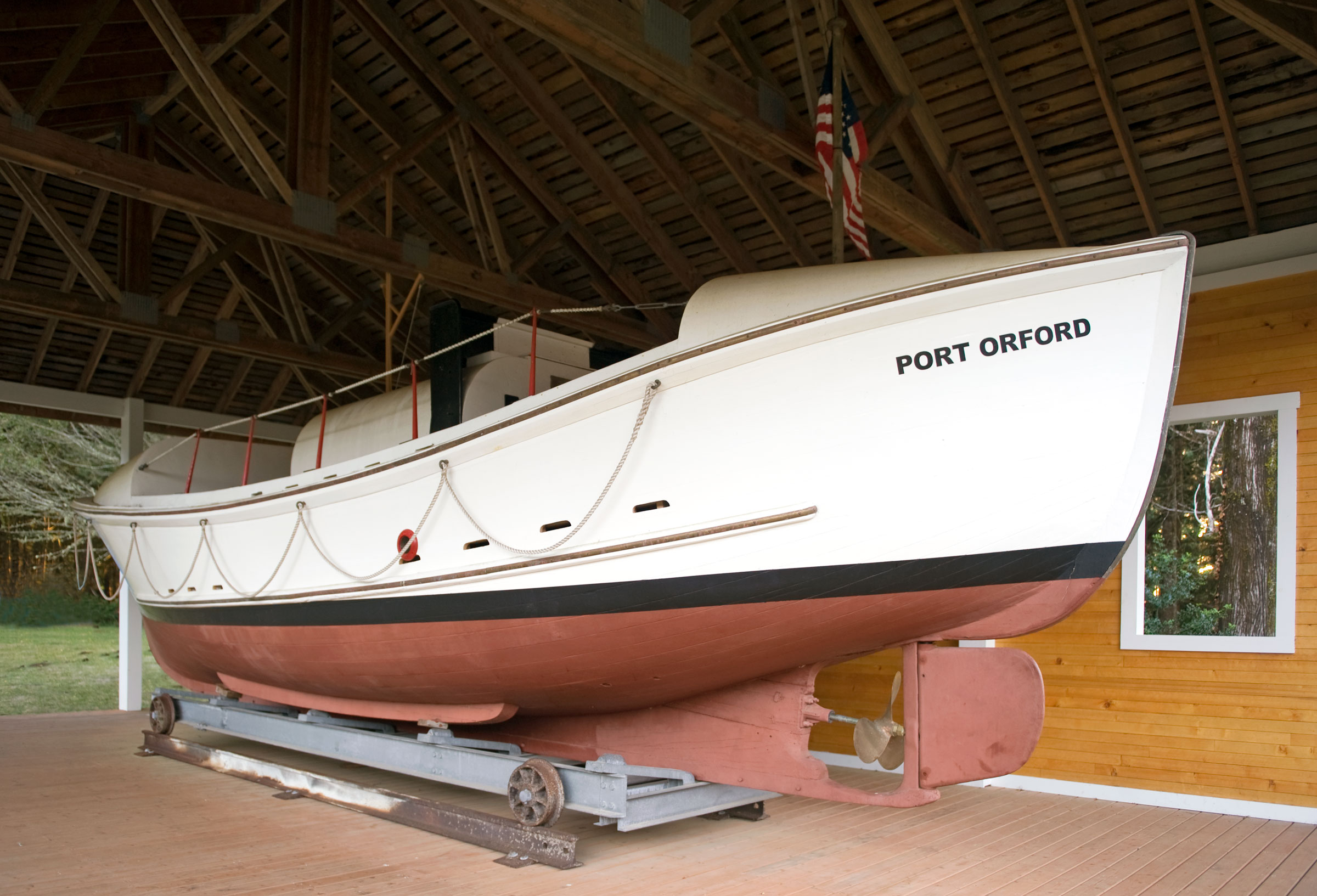
CG-36498 at Port Orford Museum

City	State	Modern Name or Locale	Era	Historical Name	NHL	NHL/NRHP #	NHL/NRHP Date	Notes
Astoria	Oregon	Custom House Park	U.S. Revenue Cutter Service 1790–1915	Astoria Custom House	No	N/A	N/A	Replica
Astoria	Oregon	Columbia River Maritime Museum	U.S. Coast Guard 1915–Present	Lightship Columbia WLV604	Yes	89002463	December 20, 1989	
Cle Elum	Washington	Laurel Hill Cemetery	U.S. Coast Guard 1915–Present	Douglas Munro Memorial	No	N/A	N/A	
Garibaldi	Oregon	Coast Guard Memorial	U.S. Coast Guard 1915–Present	CG-36531	No	N/A	N/A	
Garibaldi	Oregon	Historic Coast Guard Boathouse	U.S. Coast Guard 1915–Present	U.S. Coast Guard Station Tillamook Bay	NRHP	93001337	December 10, 1993	
Ilwaco	Washington	Lewis and Clark Interpretive Center	U.S. Life-Saving Service 1848–1915	Cape Disappointment	NRHP	75001864	August 15, 1975	Also: Cape Disappointment Light
Newport	Oregon	U.S. Coast Guard Station Newport	U.S. Coast Guard 1915–Present	CG-36503	No	N/A	N/A	
Ocean Park	Washington	Klipsan Beach Life Saving Station Vacation Rentals	U.S. Life-Saving Service 1848–1915	Klipsan Beach Life Saving Station	NRHP	79002546	July 5, 1979	
Port Orford	Oregon	Port Orford Heads State Park	U.S. Coast Guard 1915–Present	Port Orford Life Boat Station	NRHP	98000606	May 29, 1998	Also: CG-36498
Seattle	Washington	U.S. Coast Guard Base Seattle	U.S. Coast Guard 1915–Present	Coast Guard Museum Northwest	No	N/A	N/A	
Seattle	Washington	Northwest Seaport	U.S. Lighthouse Service 1789–1939	Lightship Swiftsure WLV83	Yes	75001852	April 11, 1989	
Tacoma	Washington	USCGC Comanche	U.S. Coast Guard 1915–Present	USCGC Comanche	No	N/A	N/A	
Westport	Washington	Westport Maritime Museum	U.S. Coast Guard 1915–Present	U.S. Coast Guard Station Gray's Harbor	No	N/A	N/A	Also: CG-30609
Winchester Bay	Oregon	Umpqua River Lighthouse Museum	U.S. Coast Guard 1915–Present	U.S. Coast Guard Station Umpqua River	NRHP	92000662	June 4, 1992	Also: Umpqua River Light

=== Pacific Islands ===
No NHL, NRHP or other U.S. Coast Guard heritage sites open and accessible to the public.

=== Alaska ===
No NHL, NRHP or other U.S. Coast Guard heritage sites open and accessible to the public.

== Projects ==
U.S. Coast Guard history and heritage under restoration or development. Unknown whether any of these are open to the public.

=== All Regions ===
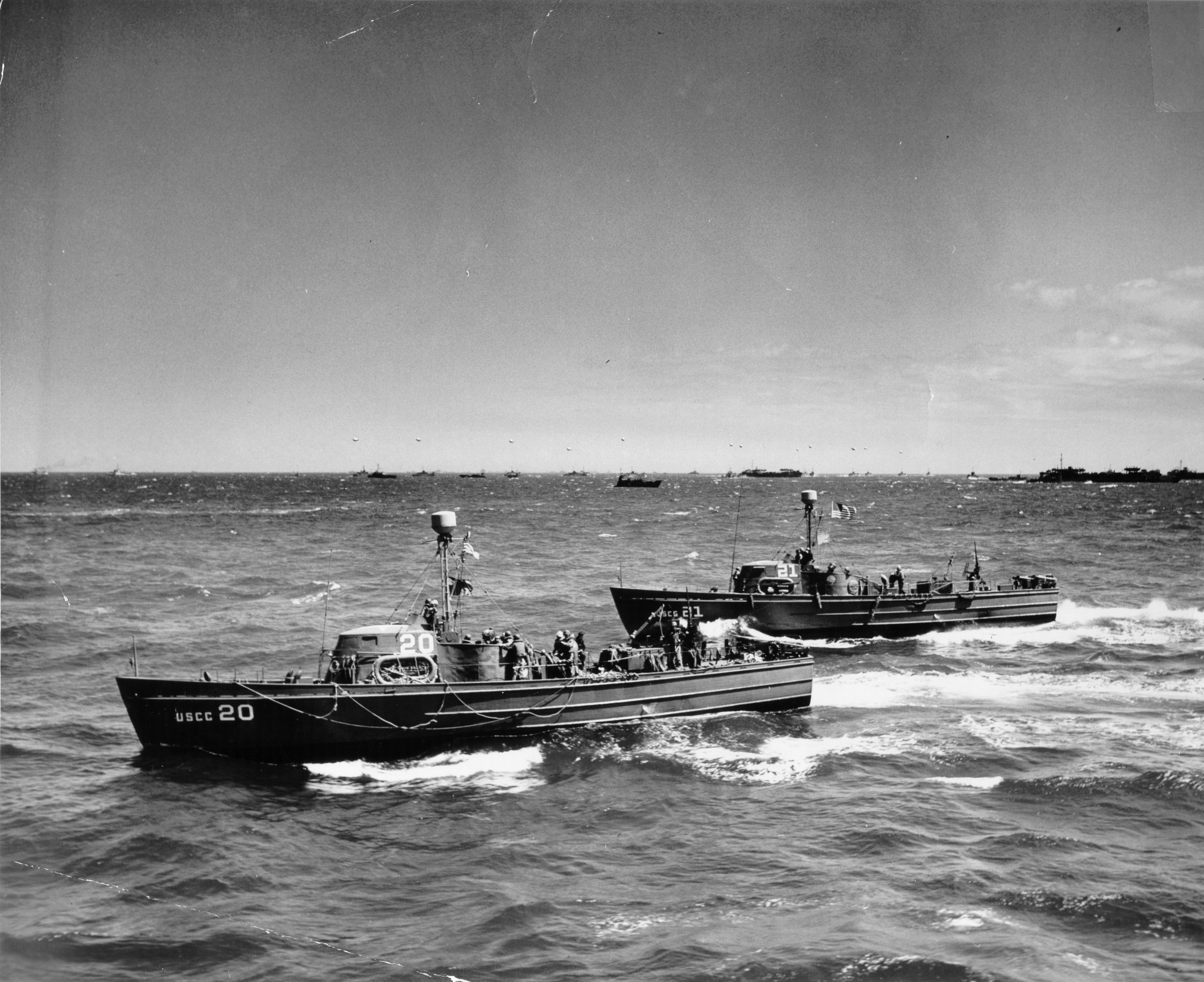
Two of USCGC Tiburon's sister ships, part of the Matchbox Fleet patrolling off Normandy Beaches during World War II

City	State	Modern Name or Locale	Era	Historical Name	NHL	NHL/NRHP #	NHL/NRHP Date	Notes
Chatham	Massachusetts	Coast Guard Boathouse	U.S. Coast Guard 1915–Present	Chatham Boathouse	No	N/A	N/A	To be located in Stage Harbor at 90 Bridge Street, expected completion in 2023
Kittery	Maine	Wood Island Life Saving Station	U.S. Life-Saving Service 1848–1915	Wood Island Life Saving Station	No	N/A	N/A	
New London	Connecticut	The National Coast Guard Museum	U.S. Coast Guard 1915–Present	The National Coast Guard Museum	No	N/A	N/A	To be located in Downtown New London, construction set to begin in 2022.
Seattle	Washington	USCGC Tiburon	U.S. Coast Guard 1915–Present	USCGC Tiburon	No	N/A	N/A	
Stockton	California	USCGC Fir	U.S. Coast Guard 1915–Present	USCGC Fir	Yes	92001880	April 27, 1992	
Vermillion	Michigan	Vermilion Life Saving Station	U.S. Life-Saving Service 1848–1915	Vermilion Life Saving Station	No	N/A	N/A	
