= U.S. Life-Saving Station No. 35 =

- U.S. National Register of Historic Places
- New Jersey Register of Historic Places
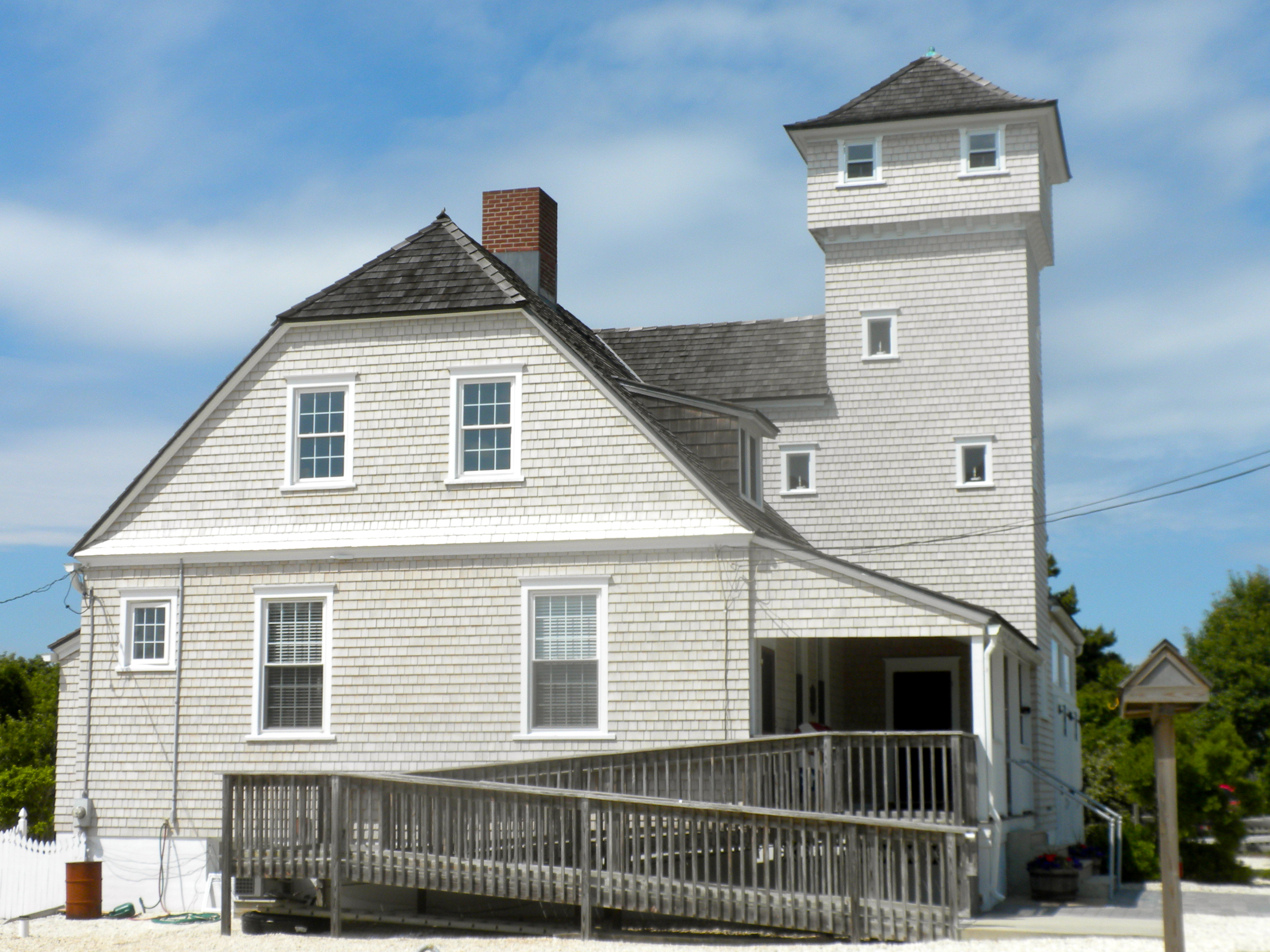
- U.S. Life-Saving Station No. 35 in 2010.

- Location within Cape May County, New Jersey Location within New Jersey Location within the United States
- Location: 11617 2nd Avenue, Stone Harbor, New Jersey
- Coordinates: 39°02′22.7″N 74°46′08.6″W
- Built: 1895
- Architect: George R. Tolman
- Architectural style: Shingle style
- NRHP reference No.: 08000970
- NJRHP No.: 4663

Significant dates
- Added to NRHP: October 8, 2008
- Designated NJRHP: July 24, 2008

The U.S. Life-Saving Station No. 35, also known as Tatham's or Stone Harbor, is located at 11617 2nd Avenue in the borough of Stone Harbor in Cape May County, New Jersey, United States. The Duluth-type life-saving station was built in 1895, designed by architect George R. Tolman using shingle style. It was added to the National Register of Historic Places on October 8, 2008, for its significance in architecture, maritime history, and transportation. In 1948, it was purchased by the American Legion Post 331.

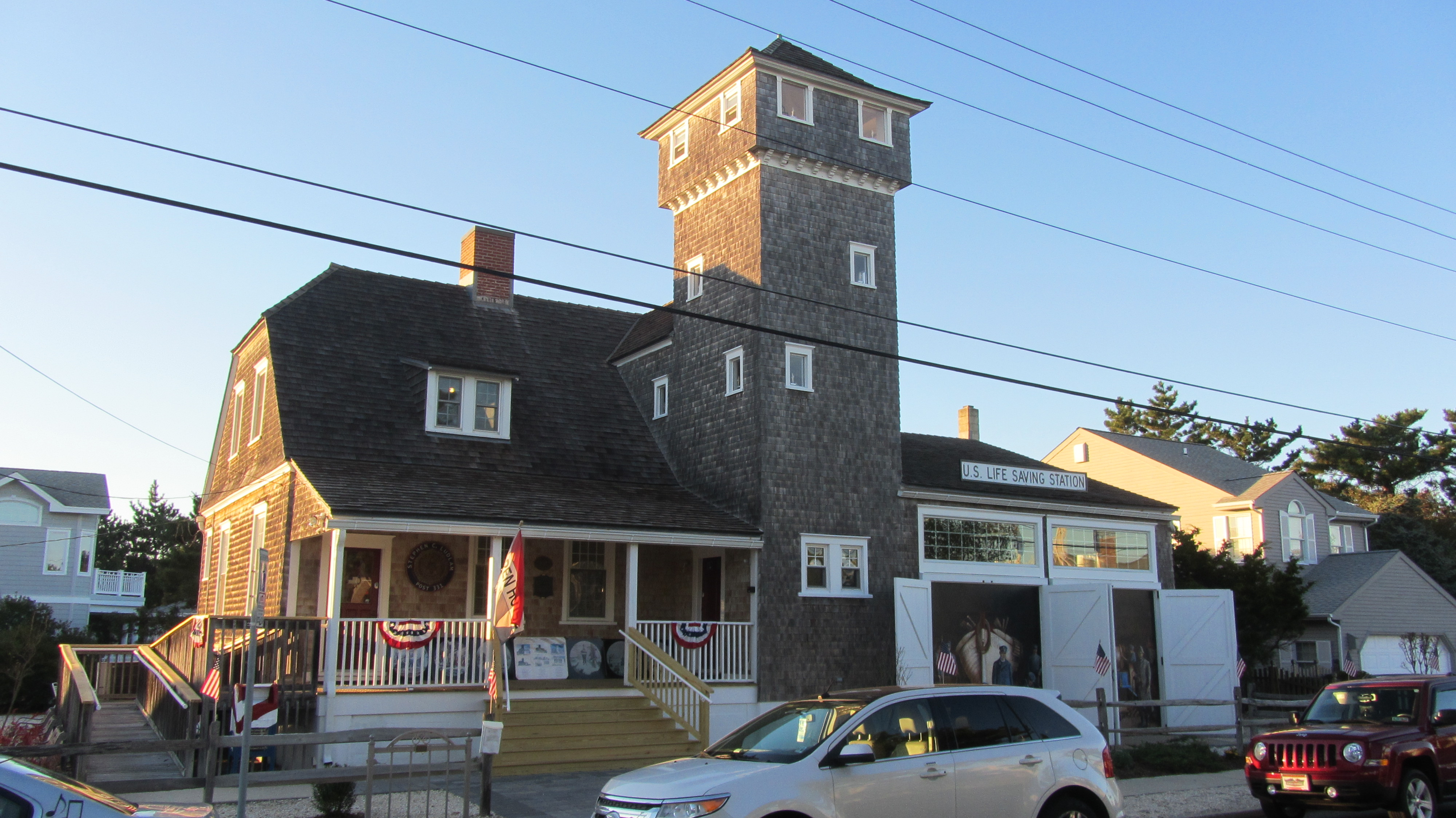
View from 2nd Avenue

== See also ==
- National Register of Historic Places listings in Cape May County, New Jersey
- United States Coast Guard History and Heritage Sites
