= U.S. Coast Guard Headquarters, Key West Station =

- U.S. National Register of Historic Places
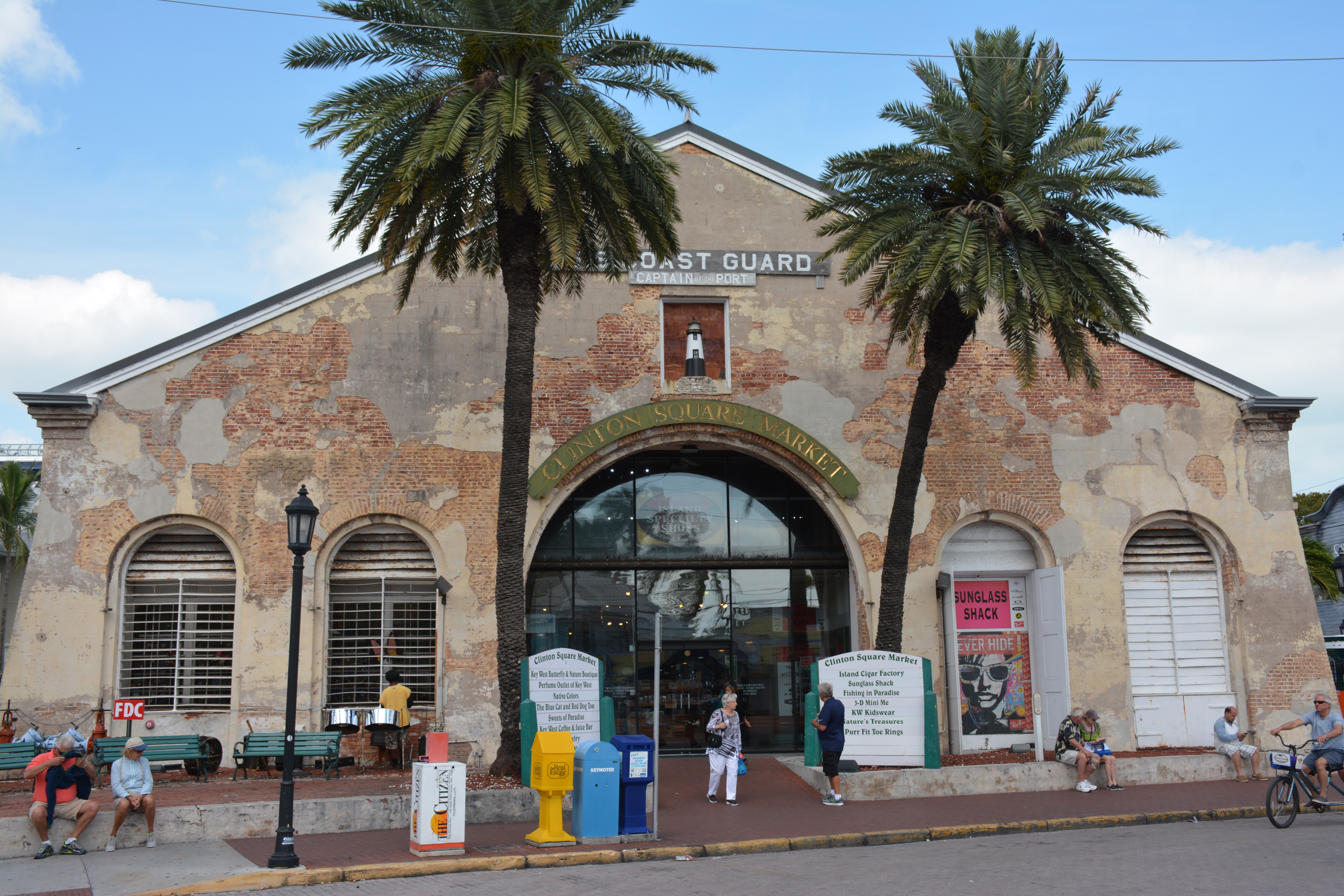

- Location within Florida Location within the United States
- Location: NW corner Front St. and Whitehead St., Key West, Florida
- Coordinates: 24.55875°N 81.80695°W
- Area: less than one acre
- Built: 1856-61
- Engineer: Scarpitt, Capt.J.M.
- NRHP reference No.: 73000590
- Added to NRHP: October 15, 1973

The U.S. Coast Guard Headquarters, Key West Station (also known as the U.S. Navy Coal Depot and Storehouse or Building #1) is a historic site in Key West, Florida. It is located at the northwest corner of the intersection of Front and Whitehead Streets. In 1973, it was added to the U.S. National Register of Historic Places.

It was built during 1856–61 to serve as a naval supplies depot. It supported the East Gulf Blockade Squadron, headquartered in Key West, of the Union blockade of the South during the American Civil War. The blockade relied upon coal-burning steamships. It later served as a Naval Administration Building until 1923. During 1932 to 1939 it served as headquarters for the 7th Lighthouse District of the U.S. Lighthouse Service. The U.S. Coast Guard took over the service and the building in 1939.

It has brick masonry walls laid in common bond, on a limestone foundation, and is the oldest brick building on Key West.
