= Ludington United States Coast Guard Station =

- U.S. National Register of Historic Places
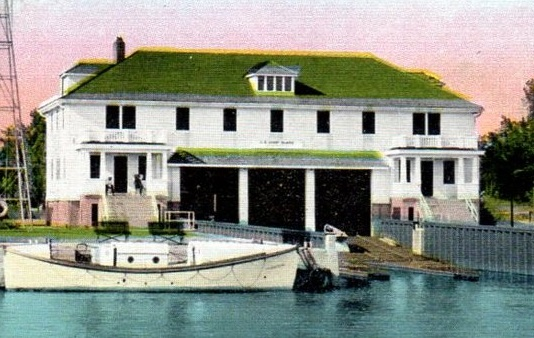
- Station c. 1930

- Location within Michigan Location within the United States
- Interactive map
- Location: 101 S Lakeshore Dr, Ludington, Michigan
- Coordinates: 43°57′12″N 86°27′34″W
- Area: less than one acre
- Built: 1933
- Architectural style: Bungalow/craftsman
- NRHP reference No.: 10000264
- Added to NRHP: May 17, 2010

The Ludington United States Coast Guard Station is a Coast Guard facility located at 101 South Lakeshore Drive in Ludington, Michigan. It was listed on the National Register of Historic Places in 2010. The building is planned to be used as a maritime museum slated to open in early 2017

== History ==
The town of Ludington (originally known as "Pere Marquette") was first platted in 1867. Population almost immediately boomed, in large part due to the planned construction of the Flint and Pere Marquette Railroad, which was completed in 1874. Ludington had over 2500 residents by that time, and the completion of the railroad spurred both passenger travel and freight shipment out of the harbor.

In 1878, as shipping increased, Congress authorized four Lake Michigan life-saving stations, including one at Ludington. A station was built on the peninsula south of the harbor in 1879. The first crew came to the station in 1880. In 1884, the station was moved to the present site on the north side of the harbor, and a new structure built. However, by the 1930s, the station had outgrown the 1884 building.

Plans for a new building were drawn up in 1932, and in 1933 the original station was moved to become a private residence. Over the next year, the set of building currently at the site were constructed. The Ludington station is nearly identical to the station built at Frankfort around the same time. In 1948, the Ludington station became headquarters for Coast Guard Group Ludington, which in 1955 absorbed the Grand Haven Group. However, in 1971 Coast Guard Group Ludington moved to Muskegon, and the Ludington facility was used as a search-and-rescue center, and in 1972 the boat launch ramps were removed and replaced with a concrete dock. Although the station declined in importance, its mission was re-evaluated in the wake of 9/11, and plans were made for a new station building.

In 2003, ground was broken on a new station nearby, and the Coast Guard moved the next year. In 2007, the City of Ludington and the Mason County Historical Society agreed to create and operate a maritime museum in the 1933 building. The General Services Administration deeded the station to the city in 2010, and the future design began. Exterior renovations were made, and the 1933 station reopened as a maritime museum on Saturday, June 10, 2017.

== Description ==
The Ludington Coast Guard Station is a large two to three-story wooden craftsman style structure, consisting of a broad hip-roof main block with a lower flat-roof rear extension; the entire structure measures 82 feet by 60 feet. The lower level is a concrete basement, serving as the first floor, while the upper levels are of wood construction and clad with wooden shingles. Broad hip-roof dormers project from each face of the hip roof. Fronting the water, two long flights of stairs lead to hip-roof entry porches on each corner of the second level. A low pent roof between the entrances marks the top of the three former boat bays. Windows are primarily single square-head window openings, with double wide ones above the doorways.

On the rear (land facing) side, the extension has two wide entrances to the boathouse, with a smaller pedestrian door between. Round windows are inset above each door. A small addition fills the interior corner between the extension and the main structure.

On the interior, the three-bay boathouse extends two stories in height, and runs through the center of the building. The remainder of the lower basement level contained a carpenter shop and storage areas. The second floor contained offices on one side of the boathouse and a galley and mess on the other. The third floor contained nine bunk rooms, two bathrooms, a TV/recreation room, and a large closet.
