= Kitty Hawk Life-Saving Station =

- U.S. National Register of Historic Places
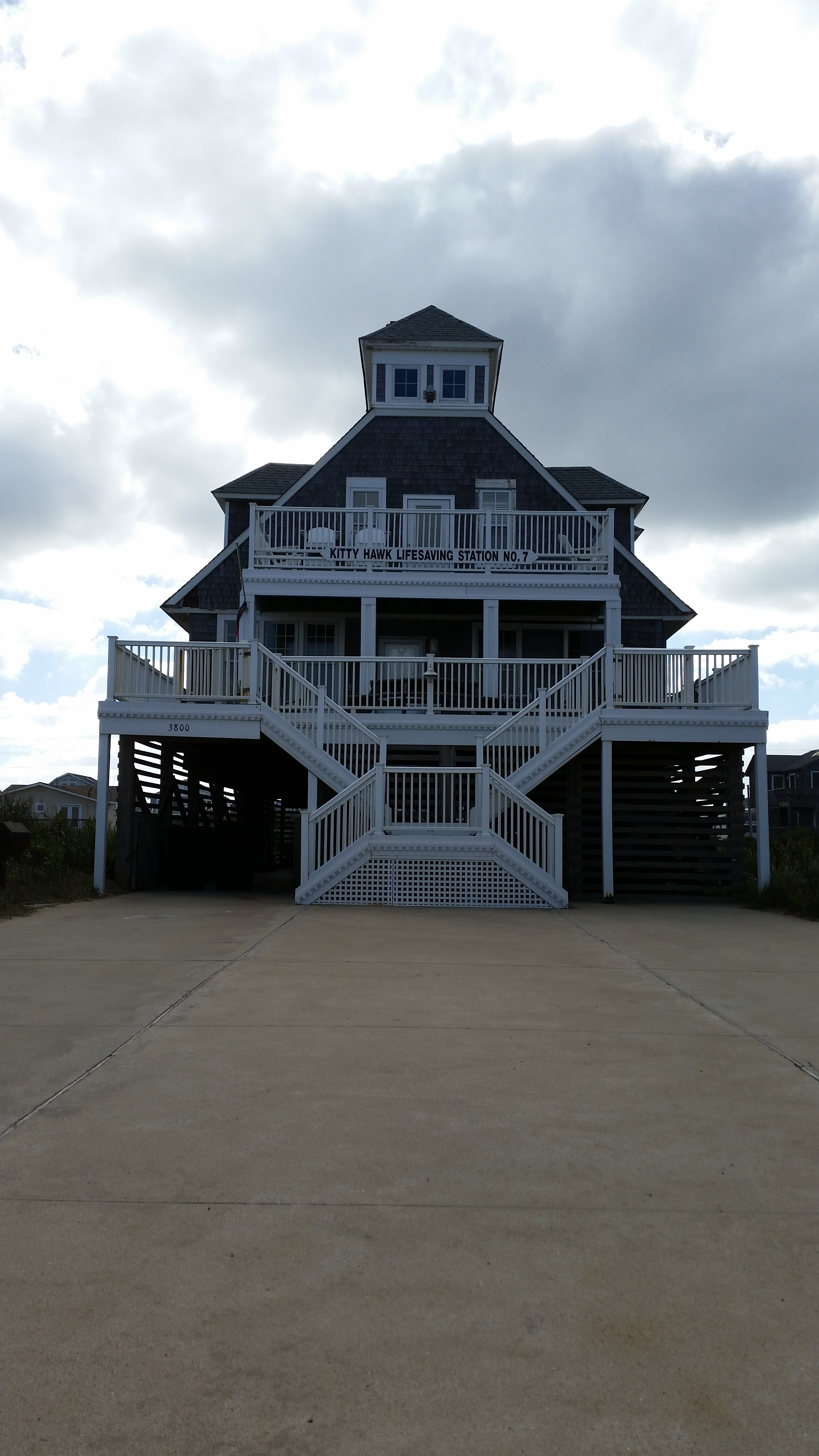

- Location within North Carolina Location within the United States
- Location: U.S. 158, Kitty Hawk, North Carolina
- Coordinates: 36°04′02″N 75°41′28″W
- Built: 1874
- Built by: Richard C. Evans
- Architectural style: Carpenter Gothic with Stick style accents
- MPS: 64501177
- NRHP reference No.: 84000073
- Added to NRHP: October 11, 1984

Kitty Hawk Life-Saving Station was a life-saving station on Kitty Hawk, on the Outer Banks of North Carolina. It was built in 1874 and put in service until 1946. The building is registered with National Register of Historic Places since October 11, 1984.

== History ==
Life-saving stations like Kitty Hawk were typically built after the 1857 North Carolina Hurricane. They generally consisted of a crew of seven men, a keeper who acted as a captain and six other men who volunteered because of their experience as mariners, sailors and fishermen. The station's first keeper was W.D. Tate who was replaced by a man named James R. Hobbs.

In 1911, a watch room above the second floor living quarters was added.
