= KWWD =

KWWD may refer to:

- Cape May Airport (ICAO code KWWD)
- KWWD (FM), a radio station (91.3 FM) licensed to serve Canadian, Texas, United States; see List of radio stations in Texas
