= National Register of Historic Places listings in Cape May County, New Jersey =

Location of Cape May County in New Jersey

The following properties and districts in Cape May County, New Jersey, are listed on the National Register of Historic Places. Latitude and longitude coordinates of the sites listed on this page may be displayed in an online map.

Contents: Counties and communities in New Jersey
Atlantic – Bergen (Closter, Franklin Lakes, Ridgewood, Saddle River, Wyckoff) – Burlington – Camden – Cape May – Cumberland – Essex – Gloucester – Hudson – Hunterdon – Mercer – Middlesex – Monmouth – Morris – Ocean – Passaic – Salem – Somerset – Sussex – Union – Warren

This National Park Service list is complete through NPS recent listings posted October 23, 2026.

	Name on the Register	Image	Date listed	Location	City or town	Description
1	Avalon Life Saving Station	Avalon Life Saving Station	March 2, 1979 (#79001480)	76 W. 15th St. 39°06′14″N 74°42′46″W	Avalon	Built 1894
2	J. Thompson Baker House	J. Thompson Baker House	May 31, 1996 (#96000551)	3008 Atlantic Ave. 38°59′N 74°49′W	Wildwood	Built 1909
3	Battery 223	Battery 223	June 25, 2008 (#08000555)	Beach at Cape May State Park; 38°55′53″N 74°57′20″W	Lower Township	Built 1943
4	Thomas Beesley Jr. House	Thomas Beesley Jr. House	February 12, 1998 (#98000098)	605 NJ 9 N 39°05′55″N 74°48′50″W	Middle Township	
5	Thomas Beesley Sr. House	Thomas Beesley Sr. House	December 17, 1992 (#92001682)	12 Beesley's Pl. Beesley's Point; 39°16′47″N 74°37′46″W	Upper Township	Built 1816
6	Beth Judah Temple	Beth Judah Temple	September 11, 2025 (#100012209)	3912 Pacific Avenue; 38°59′15″N 74°49′01″W	Wildwood	
7	Brandywine Shoal Light Station	Brandywine Shoal Light Station	January 8, 2007 (#06000943)	In lower Delaware Bay, about 8.8 mi. WNW of Cape May Point; 38°59′10″N 75°06′47″W	Cape May Point	Built 1828 (1st light); Built 1850 (2nd light); Built 1914 (3rd light)
8	Calvary Baptist Church	Calvary Baptist Church	November 25, 1980 (#80002477)	SW of Ocean View at Seaville Rd. and NJ 9; 39°10′14″N 74°44′26″W	Dennis Township	Built 1855
9	Cape May Historic District	Cape May Historic District	December 29, 1970 (#70000383)	Cape May; 38°56′24″N 74°54′46″W	Cape May	Built 1850; 600 buildings
10	Cape May Lighthouse	Cape May Lighthouse	November 12, 1973 (#73001090)	Cape May Point State Park; 38°55′59″N 74°57′37″W	Lower Township	Built 1859
11	Caribbean Motel	Caribbean Motel	August 24, 2005 (#05000915)	5600 Ocean Ave. 38°58′45″N 74°49′32″W	Wildwood Crest	Built 1958
12	Chateau Bleu Motel	Chateau Bleu Motel	March 25, 2004 (#04000221)	911 Surf Ave. 39°00′05″N 74°47′42″W	North Wildwood	Built 1962. Demolished in 2025.
13	Owen Coachman House	Owen Coachman House	September 9, 2005 (#05000964)	1019 Batts Lane; 38°57′37″N 74°55′45″W	Lower Township	
14	Cold Spring Grange Hall	Cold Spring Grange Hall	March 30, 1998 (#98000234)	720 Seahore Road, Cold Spring; 38°58′39″N 74°54′48″W	Lower Township	Built 1912
15	Cold Spring Presbyterian Church	Cold Spring Presbyterian Church	June 14, 1991 (#91000785)	780 Seashore Rd. 38°58′35″N 74°54′59″W	Lower Township	Built 1823
16	Colonial Knitting Mills	Colonial Knitting Mills	October 29, 2025 (#100012375)	502 S. Main Street, Cape May Court House; 39°04′30″N 74°49′37″W	Middle Township	
17	John Corson Jr. House Site	John Corson Jr. House Site	February 12, 2015 (#06000686)	1542 Shore Road; 39°13′46″N 74°41′09″W	Upper Township	
18	Cresse-Holmes House Historic District	Cresse-Holmes House Historic District	June 12, 1979 (#79001481)	504 U.S. 9 North; 39°05′46″N 74°48′48″W	Cape May Court House	The Museum of Cape May County; a boundary increase, renaming, and change to historic district were approved March 7, 2025.
19	Dennisville Historic District	Dennisville Historic District	November 24, 1987 (#87000848)	Petersburg Rd., Main St., Church Rd., Hall Ave., Fidler and Academy Rds., and NH 47; also roughly bounded by Gatzmer Ave., RR. tracks, NJ 47, and N. side of Petersburg Rd. and NJ 47; Dennisville; 39°11′34″N 74°49′16″W	Dennis Township	
20	Joseph Falkinburg House	Joseph Falkinburg House	October 3, 1994 (#94001153)	922 Delsea Drive, South Dennis; 39°10′22″N 74°49′15″W	Dennis Township	Also spelled Joseph Falkenburg House
21	Fire Control Tower No. 23	Fire Control Tower No. 23	November 17, 2003 (#03000655)	Sunset Boulevard; 38°56′36″N 74°58′03″W	Lower Township	
22	Fishing Creek Schoolhouse	Fishing Creek Schoolhouse	March 6, 1980 (#80002478)	2102 Bayshore Rd. 39°00′51″N 74°56′20″W	Villas	
23	The Flanders Hotel	The Flanders Hotel	November 20, 2009 (#09000939)	719 East 11th Street; 39°16′29″N 74°34′36″W	Ocean City	
24	Judge Nathaniel Foster House	Judge Nathaniel Foster House	August 25, 2014 (#14000516)	1649 Bayshore Dr. 39°01′13″N 74°56′07″W	Lower Township	
25	John Wesley Gandy House	John Wesley Gandy House	November 12, 1999 (#99001309)	26 Tyler Rd. Greenfield; 39°14′02″N 74°42′24″W	Upper Township	
26	Goshen School	Goshen School	May 12, 2014 (#14000202)	316 N. Delsea Drive, Goshen; 39°08′15″N 74°51′13″W	Middle Township	
27	Hangar No. 1-United States Naval Air Station Wildwood	Hangar No. 1-United States Naval Air Station Wildwood	August 21, 1997 (#97000935)	Jct. of Forrestal and Langley Rds. Cape May Airport; 39°00′18″N 74°54′37″W	Lower Township	
28	Hereford Lighthouse	Hereford Lighthouse	September 20, 1977 (#77000859)	Central Ave. 39°00′24″N 74°47′32″W	North Wildwood	Built 1874
29	George Hildreth House	George Hildreth House	July 28, 1999 (#99000905)	731 Seashore Road, Cold Spring; 38°58′42″N 74°54′44″W	Lower Township	
30	Thomas Leaming House	Thomas Leaming House	August 1, 1997 (#97000801)	1845 US 9 N 39°08′30″N 74°46′01″W	Middle Township	
31	Henry Ludlam House	Henry Ludlam House	August 12, 1993 (#93000826)	1336 NJ 47; Dennisville; 39°11′43″N 74°50′31″W	Dennis Township	
32	Thomas Ludlam Jr. House	Thomas Ludlam Jr. House	November 26, 2004 (#04001261)	707 NJ47; 39°10′09″N 74°49′31″W	Dennis Township	
33	Marine National Bank	Marine National Bank	December 20, 2000 (#00001494)	3301 Pacific Ave. 38°59′24″N 74°48′47″W	Wildwood	
34	Marshallville Historic District	Marshallville Historic District	November 28, 1989 (#89002013)	Roughly Marshallville Rd. at Co. Rt. 557; 39°17′54″N 74°46′42″W	Upper Township	
35	Naval Air Station Wildwood Historic District	Naval Air Station Wildwood Historic District	July 28, 2015 (#13000945)	Bounded by Forrestal and Monterre Roads, and the runways and taxiways to the north and east 39°00′24″N 74°54′23″W	Lower Township	Former site of Naval Air Station Wildwood, now Cape May Airport
36	New Asbury Methodist Episcopal Meeting House	New Asbury Methodist Episcopal Meeting House	September 17, 1980 (#80002476)	Shore Road, 6 miles north of Cape May Court House; 39°08′25″N 74°46′10″W	Middle Township	
37	Ocean City 34th Street Station	Ocean City 34th Street Station	June 22, 1984 (#84002613)	34th Street; 39°15′06″N 74°36′49″W	Ocean City	Demolished
38	Ocean City City Hall	Ocean City City Hall	June 13, 1997 (#97000565)	Jct. of 9th St. and Asbury Ave. 39°16′43″N 74°34′34″W	Ocean City	
39	Ocean City Life-Saving Station	Ocean City Life-Saving Station	June 14, 2013 (#13000385)	801 4th St. 39°16′55″N 74°33′56″W	Ocean City	Built in 1886.
40	Ocean City Residential Historic District	Ocean City Residential Historic District	March 20, 2003 (#03000129)	Roughly bounded by 3rd and 8th Sts. and Central and Ocean Aves., 39°16′52″N 74°34′14″W	Ocean City	
41	Ocean City Tenth Street Station	Ocean City Tenth Street Station	June 22, 1984 (#84002610)	10th Street and Haven Avenue; 39°16′44″N 74°34′43″W	Ocean City	
42	Octagonal Poultry House	Octagonal Poultry House	March 14, 2008 (#08000177)	720 U.S. Route 9, Cold Spring; 38°58′46″N 74°54′45″W	Lower Township	
43	Old Cape May County Courthouse Building	Old Cape May County Courthouse Building	December 22, 1981 (#81000389)	N. Main Street (US 9); 39°05′02″N 74°49′26″W	Cape May Court House	
44	Jonathan Pyne House	Jonathan Pyne House	February 14, 1997 (#97000061)	609 Sea Grove Ave. 38°56′18″N 74°57′35″W	Lower Township	
45	Reeves–Iszard–Godfey House	Reeves–Iszard–Godfey House	March 9, 2005 (#05000127)	3097 Shore Rd. 39°11′49″N 74°42′42″W	Upper Township	
46	Rio Grande Station	Rio Grande Station	February 13, 2007 (#07000047)	720 NJ 9; 38°58′31″N 74°54′41″W	Lower Township	
47	Rufwud Cottage	Rufwud Cottage	December 2, 2014 (#14000979)	394 93rd Street; 39°03′28″N 74°45′40″W	Stone Harbor	
48	Saint Peter's-By-The-Sea Episcopal Church	Saint Peter's-By-The-Sea Episcopal Church	August 3, 1995 (#95000978)	Jct. of Ocean Ave. and Lake Dr. 38°56′03″N 74°58′00″W	Cape May Point	
49	South Tuckahoe Historic District	South Tuckahoe Historic District	March 7, 1997 (#97000103)	Roughly, along NJ 557 and NJ 50 from the Tuckahoe River to Kendall Ln., Upper Township; 39°17′20″N 74°45′10″W	Tuckahoe	
50	TBM-3E Avenger Torpedo Bomber	TBM-3E Avenger Torpedo Bomber	February 11, 2003 (#03000019)	500 Forrestal Road; Cape May Airport; 39°00′17″N 74°54′36″W	Lower Township	In the Naval Air Station Wildwood Aviation Museum
51	William S. Townsend House	William S. Townsend House	April 5, 1984 (#84002618)	96 Delsea Drive, Dennisville; 39°11′35″N 74°49′56″W	Dennis Township	
52	Tuckahoe Station	Tuckahoe Station	June 22, 1984 (#84002626)	Railroad Ave. and Mill Rd. 39°17′28″N 74°45′39″W	Tuckahoe	
53	U.S. Life-Saving Station No. 35	U.S. Life-Saving Station No. 35	November 8, 2008 (#08000970)	11617 2nd Avenue; 39°02′22″N 74°46′08″W	Stone Harbor	
54	Whilldin–Miller House	Whilldin–Miller House	February 12, 2003 (#03000012)	416 S. Broadway; 38°56′04″N 74°55′53″W	West Cape May	
55	Woodbine Brotherhood Synagogue	Woodbine Brotherhood Synagogue	September 17, 1980 (#80002479)	612 Washington Ave. 39°14′21″N 74°49′08″W	Woodbine	
