= Ocean City Residential Historic District =

Historic district in New Jersey, United States

- U.S. National Register of Historic Places
- U.S. Historic district
- New Jersey Register of Historic Places
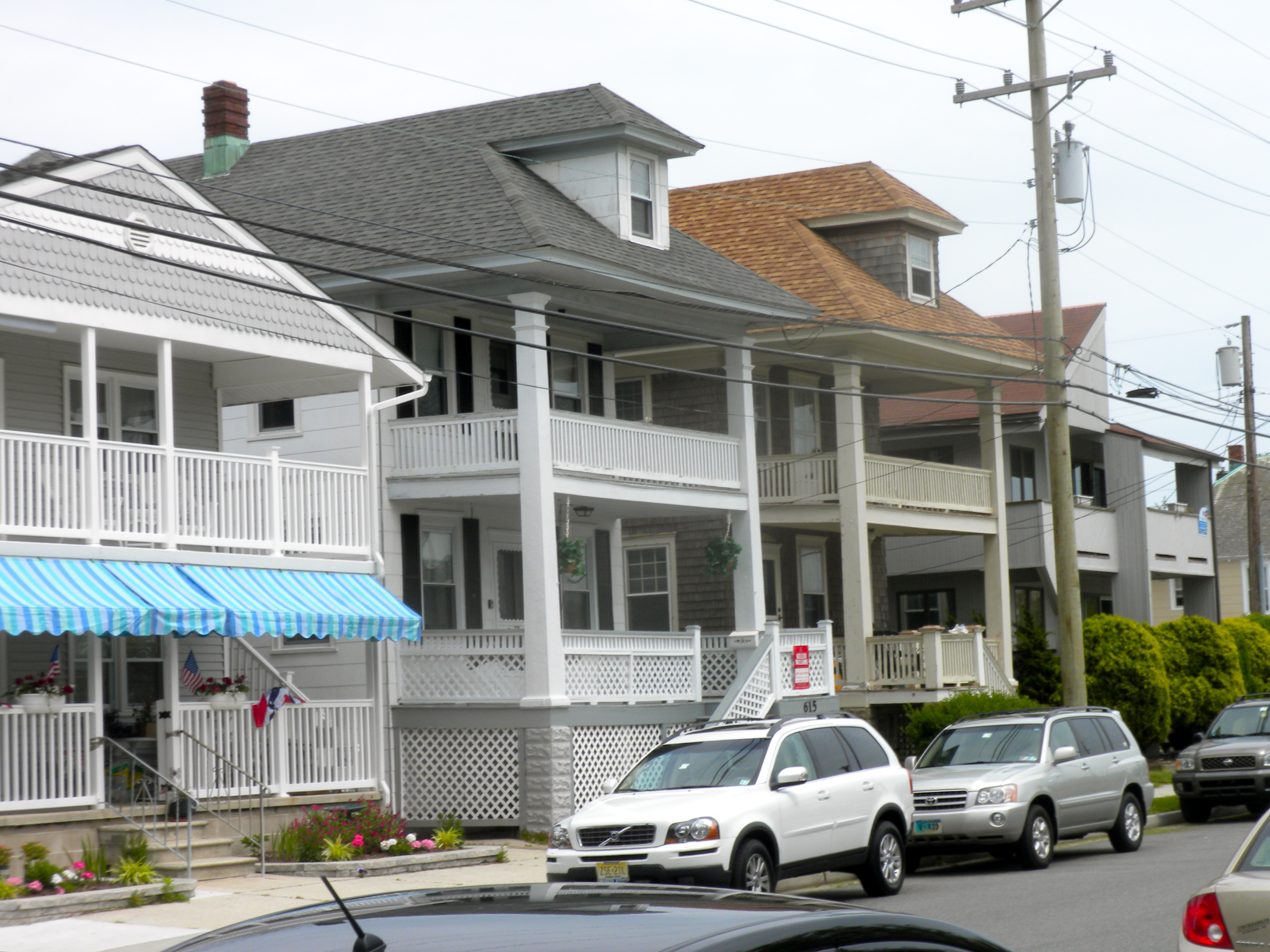
- Ocean City Residential Historic District in 2010.

- Location within Cape May County, New Jersey Location within New Jersey Location within the United States
- Location: Roughly bounded by 3rd and 8th Streets and Central and Ocean Avenues, Ocean City, New Jersey
- Coordinates: 39°16′52″N 74°34′14″W
- Area: 44.6 acres (18.0 ha)
- Architectural style: Late Victorian, Late 19th And 20th Century Revivals
- NRHP reference No.: 03000129
- NJRHP No.: 4147

Significant dates
- Added to NRHP: March 20, 2003
- Designated NJRHP: January 15, 2003

Ocean City Residential Historic District consists of 169 properties, dating back to the 1880s, located in Ocean City, New Jersey. The district was added to the National Register of Historic Places on March 20, 2003.

== History ==
Before Ocean City, New Jersey was founded, several families lived on the barrier island, then known as Peck's Beach. In 1879, a group of eight Methodist ministers founded the New Brighton Association as a land development company. On October 20 of that year, the group founded the Ocean City Association to develop the island as a religious resort, with a grid plan of streets running parallel to, and intersecting, each other. On May 25 of the following year, the Association began selling lots in the northern portion of the island, centered around a campground area between what is now Fifth and Sixth Streets. If buyers failed to adhere to the Association's moral code, than the property would be returned to the Association. In 1880 alone, buyers built 35 houses, along a hotel, two bath houses, and ten private stables.

A total of 32 houses built in the 1880s are part of the current historic district, including one built by Ocean City Association member Ezra B. Lake. More houses were built in the succeeding decades, aided by improved transportation. By the 1920s, most available lots in the originally settled northern portion of Ocean City were already built. The city's growth halted in 1929 following the stock market crash and subsequent Great Depression.

In the 1980s, developers began tearing down older structures and rebuilding them as duplexes. In 1988, Ocean City added a Historic Preservation Plan Element to its master plan. Three years later, the city designated the Ocean City Residential Historic District from Third to Eighth Streets, and along Wesley, Ocean, and Central Avenues; also included in the District was the Life-Saving Station at 4th and Atlantic.

== List of homes in the district ==
Address	Date	Style	Notes
300 Central Avenue	~1950	Cape Cod revival	Not a contributing property
301 Central Avenue	1880s	Folk Victorian	
304 Central Avenue	1890s-1900s	Folk Victorian	
305 Central Avenue	1880s	Queen Anne	
308 Central Avenue	1890s-1900s	Folk Victorian	
312 Central Avenue	1890s	Second Empire	One of the key contributing properties
315 Central Avenue	1890s-1900s	Folk Victorian	Possibly was moved from another location
317 Central Avenue	1890s-1900s	Folk Victorian	
321 Central Avenue	~1918-22	Colonial Revival	
324 Central Avenue	1880s	Queen Anne	
325 Central Avenue	1910s	American Craftsman	
328 Central Avenue	~1950s	Cape Cod revival	Not a contributing property
329 Central Avenue	1910s	American Craftsman	
330-332 Central Avenue	1920s	American Craftsman	
334 Central Avenue	1892	Dutch Colonial Revival architecture	One of the key contributing properties
335 Central Avenue	~1960	International Style	Not a contributing property
337 Central Avenue	1930s	Neoclassical revival	
340-342 Central Avenue	1920s	Colonial Revival	
341 Central Avenue	1880s	Colonial Revival	
346 Central Avenue	1880s	Folk Victorian	Car garage added in the 1950s
406 Central Avenue	1800s	Italianate	
408 Central Avenue	1890s-1900s	Colonial Revival	
409 Central Avenue	1920s	American Craftsman	
411 Central Avenue	1880s	Folk Victorian	One of the original meeting cottages; a key contributing property
412 Central Avenue	~1910s	Neoclassical revival	
413-415 Central Avenue	~1910s	American Craftsman/Colonial Revival	
416 Central Avenue	1890s-1900s	Second Empire	
417 Central Avenue	1910s	American Craftsman	
420 Central Avenue	1880s	Queen Anne	
421-423 Central Avenue	1890s	Second Empire	
425-427 Central Avenue	~1980s	Contemporary	Not a contributing property
426 Central Avenue	1890s-1900s	Folk Victorian	
428 Central Avenue	1880s	Queen Anne	
429-431 Central Avenue	1890s	Second Empire	
432 Central Avenue	~1970s-1990s	Contemporary	Not a contributing property
433 Central Avenue	~1900s	American Craftsman/Colonial Revival	
434 Central Avenue	~1920s	Colonial Revival	Modified to Second Empire/American Craftsman; not a contributing property
435 Central Avenue	~1900s	American Craftsman/Colonial Revival	
438 Central Avenue	~1910	Folk Victorian	
600 Central Avenue	1917	American Craftsman	
601 Central Avenue	~1990s	Contemporary	Not a contributing property
604 Central Avenue	1890s-1900s	Second Empire	
608 Central Avenue	1890s-1900s	Queen Anne	
611 Central Avenue	1890s-1900s	Folk Victorian	
613 Central Avenue	1890s-1900s	Folk Victorian	
617 Central Avenue	1890s-1900s	Second Empire	
618 Central Avenue	1890s-1900s	Colonial Revival	
622-624 Central Avenue	1890s-1900s	Queen Anne/Colonial Revival	
623 Central Avenue	1890s-1900s	Queen Anne	
625 Central Avenue	1890s-1900s	Queen Anne	
626 Central Avenue	1890s-1900s	Folk Victorian	
629 Central Avenue	1880s	Folk Victorian	One of the original meeting cottages; a key contributing property
631 Central Avenue	1880s	Second Empire	
634-636 Central Avenue	1880s	Queen Anne	
635 Central Avenue	~1910	Neoclassical revival	
638 Central Avenue	1880s	Folk Victorian	
639 Central Avenue	1880s	Folk Victorian	
640-642 Central Avenue	1880s	Queen Anne	
641 Central Avenue	~1910	Folk Victorian	
644 Central Avenue	1880s	Colonial Revival	
650 Central Avenue	1880s	Folk Victorian	
701 Central Avenue	1880s	Queen Anne	One of the key contributing properties
705 Central Avenue	1891	Folk Victorian	One of the key contributing properties; built for the daughter of Parker Miller, one of the island's first permanent residents
715-717 Central Avenue	1890s-1900s	Second Empire	
801 Central Avenue	1890s-1900s	Queen Anne	One of the key contributing properties; the first floor was converted to commercial use
401 Wesley Avenue	1890s-1900s	Queen Anne	Known as Northwood Inn B&B
403-405 Wesley Avenue	1880s	Queen Anne	
420 Wesley Avenue	1880s	Folk Victorian/Gothic Revival	
423 Wesley Avenue	2001	Contemporary Queen Anne	Not a contributing property
424 Wesley Avenue	~1900	Queen Anne	Known as Dancing Turtle Inn
426 Wesley Avenue	1800s-1900s	Queen Anne	
428 Wesley Avenue	1880s	Folk Victorian	
429 Wesley Avenue	1880s	Queen Anne/Gothic Revival	
435 Wesley Avenue	1881	Italianate	One of the key contributing properties; owned by Ezra B. Lake; now known as Scotch Hall Restaurant
Reference - National Register of Historic Places Application

== Other properties ==
The Ocean City Residential Historic District is centered around an open area between 5th and Sixth Streets. In 1881, an auditorium was built between Fifth and Sixth Streets, which became the Ocean City Tabernacle; the building was replaced in 1955 by another building at the same location.

At the intersection of 8th Street and Central Avenue, St. Peter's United Methodist Church was built in 1908 in a Gothic Revival architecture. Originally, it was a two-story building, with a three-story tower, with a two-story addition built in 1956. The church's foundation is made of cast stone and granite, and the building's exterior wall is made of stone, featuring stained glass windows. The roof is cross-gabled, with a raised parapet, pinnacles, and a bell tower. It is a key contributing property to the district.

== See also ==
- National Register of Historic Places listings in Cape May County, New Jersey
