= Rufwud Cottage =

- U.S. National Register of Historic Places
- New Jersey Register of Historic Places
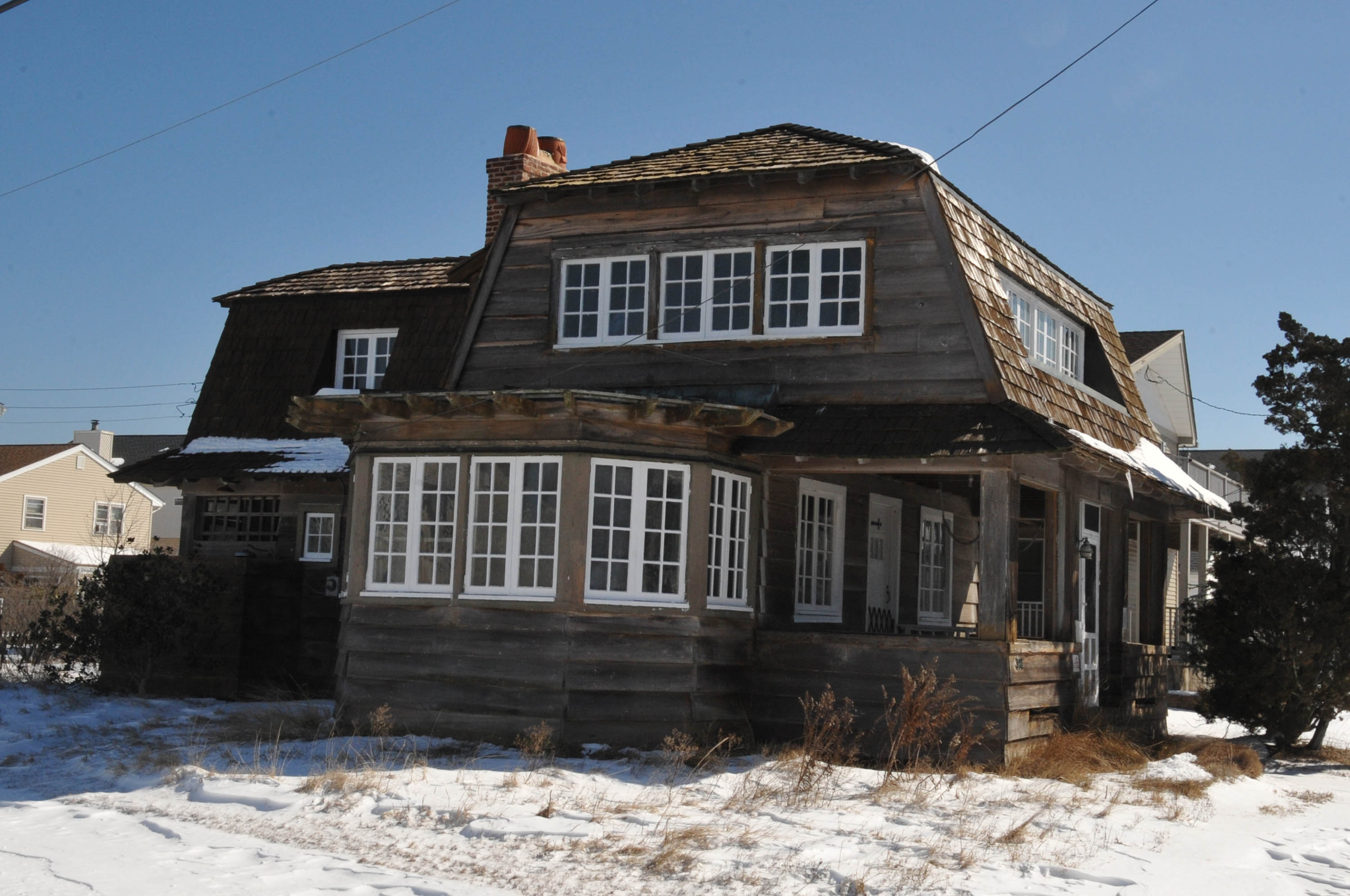

- Location within Cape May County, New Jersey Location within New Jersey Location within the United States
- Location: 394 93rd Street, Stone Harbor, New Jersey
- Coordinates: 39°03′28.1″N 74°45′40.3″W
- Built: 1917
- Architect: Oscar Mons Hokanson
- Architectural style: American Craftsman
- NRHP reference No.: 14000979
- NJRHP No.: 5189

Significant dates
- Added to NRHP: December 2, 2014
- Designated NJRHP: October 6, 2014

The Rufwud Cottage is located at 394 93rd Street in the borough of Stone Harbor in Cape May County, New Jersey, United States. The historic summer beach house was built in 1917 and features American Craftsman style. It was added to the National Register of Historic Places on December 2, 2014, for its significance in architecture. It was designed by the master architect Oscar Mons Hokanson, who named it Rufwod (rough wood). Hokanson and his wife lived here during the summer months. He sold it to his wife's niece, Katherine C. Brown, in 1940. She sold it to her son, Christopher P. Brown, in 1989.

== See also ==
- National Register of Historic Places listings in Cape May County, New Jersey
