= Reeves–Iszard–Godfey House =

Historic house in New Jersey, United States

- U.S. National Register of Historic Places
- New Jersey Register of Historic Places
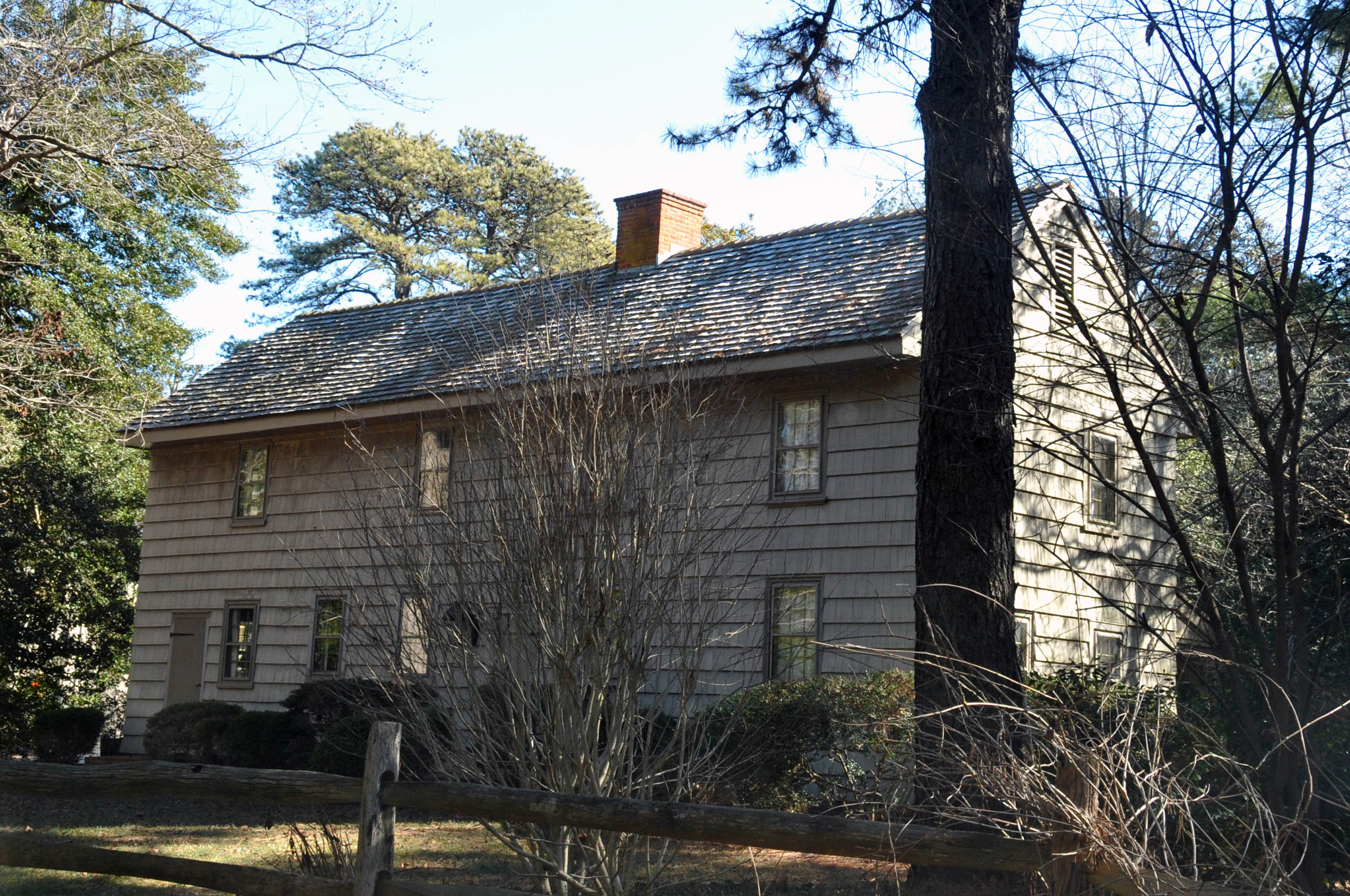

- Location within Cape May County, New Jersey Location within New Jersey Location within the United States
- Location: 3097 Shore Road, Upper Township, New Jersey
- Coordinates: 39°11′49″N 74°42′42″W
- Area: 6.4 acres (2.6 ha)
- Built: 1695
- Architectural style: Postmedieval English
- NRHP reference No.: 05000127
- NJRHP No.: 4388

Significant dates
- Added to NRHP: March 9, 2005
- Designated NJRHP: December 6, 2004

Reeves–Iszard–Godfrey House, also known as the Philip Godfrey House, is located in Upper Township, Cape May County, New Jersey, United States. The house was built in 1695 and added to the National Register of Historic Places on March 9, 2005.

As of 2025, it remains a private residence.

== See also ==
- National Register of Historic Places listings in Cape May County, New Jersey
