= Goshen School =

- U.S. National Register of Historic Places
- New Jersey Register of Historic Places
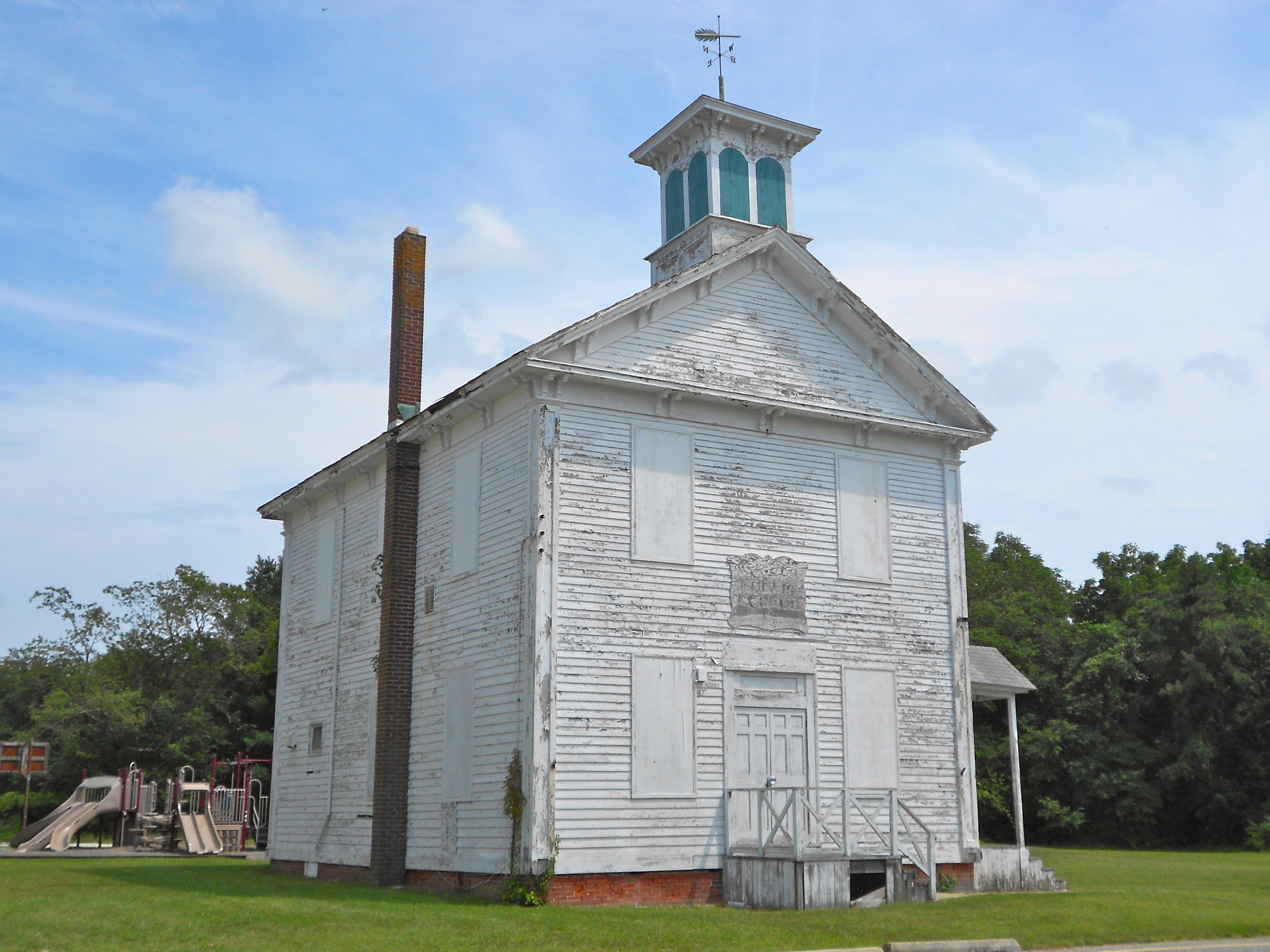

- Location within Cape May County, New Jersey Location within New Jersey Location within the United States
- Location: 316 North Delsea Drive, Goshen, New Jersey
- Coordinates: 39°08′14.6″N 74°51′13.3″W
- Built: 1872
- Architectural style: Late Victorian / Italianate
- NRHP reference No.: 14000202
- NJRHP No.: 4910

Significant dates
- Added to NRHP: May 12, 2014
- Designated NJRHP: February 11, 2014

The Goshen School is located at 316 North Delsea Drive (New Jersey Route 47) in the Goshen section of Middle Township in Cape May County, New Jersey, United States. The historic school building was built in 1872 and was documented by the Historic American Buildings Survey (HABS) in 1990. It was added to the National Register of Historic Places on May 12, 2014, for its significance in architecture and education.

According to the nomination form, it is one of the oldest extant schoolhouses in the county. It was used as a school until 1962. The building features a bell tower and Italianate style.

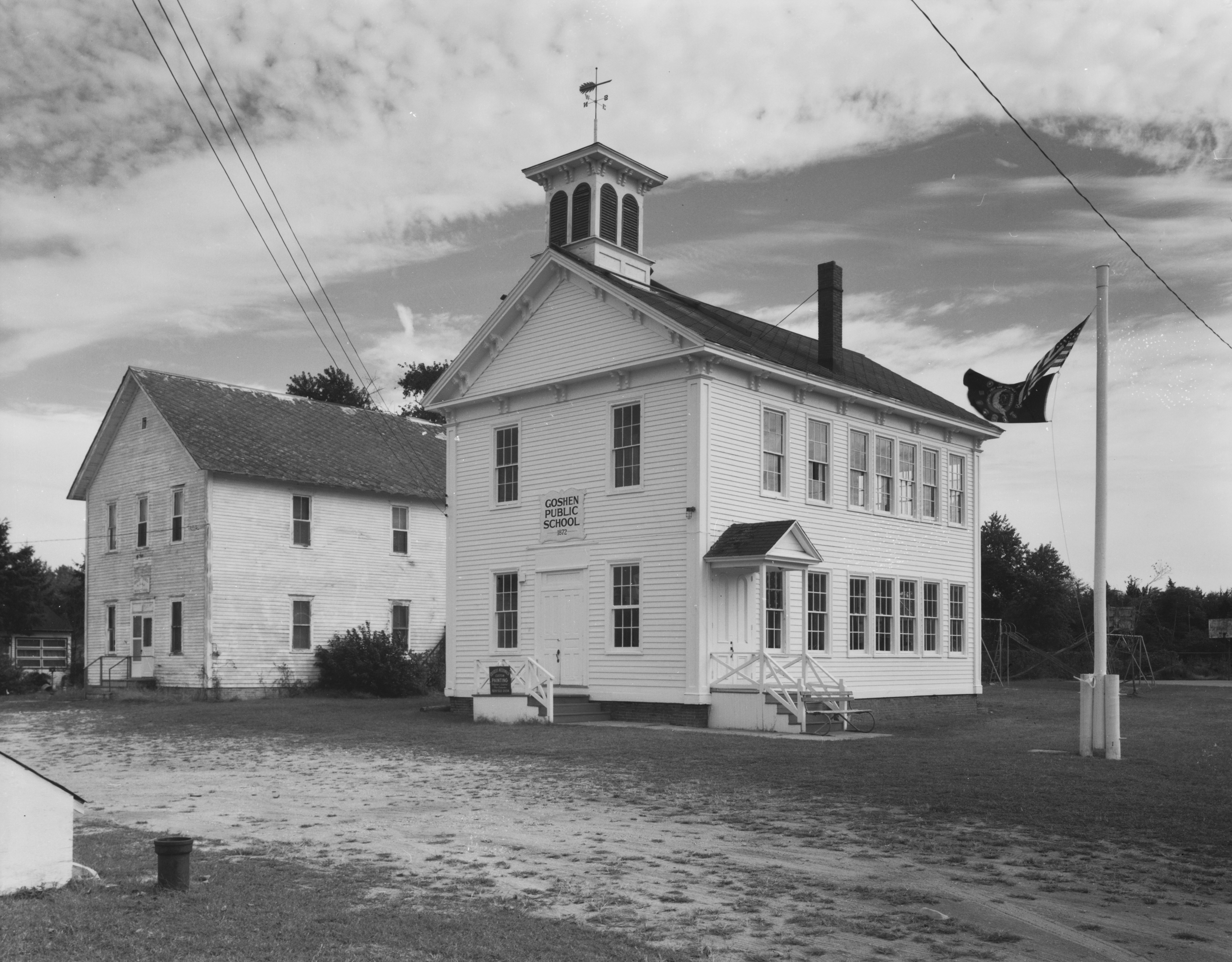
HABS photo from 1990

== See also ==
- National Register of Historic Places listings in Cape May County, New Jersey
