= Henry Ludlam House =

Historic house in New Jersey, United States

- U.S. National Register of Historic Places
- New Jersey Register of Historic Places
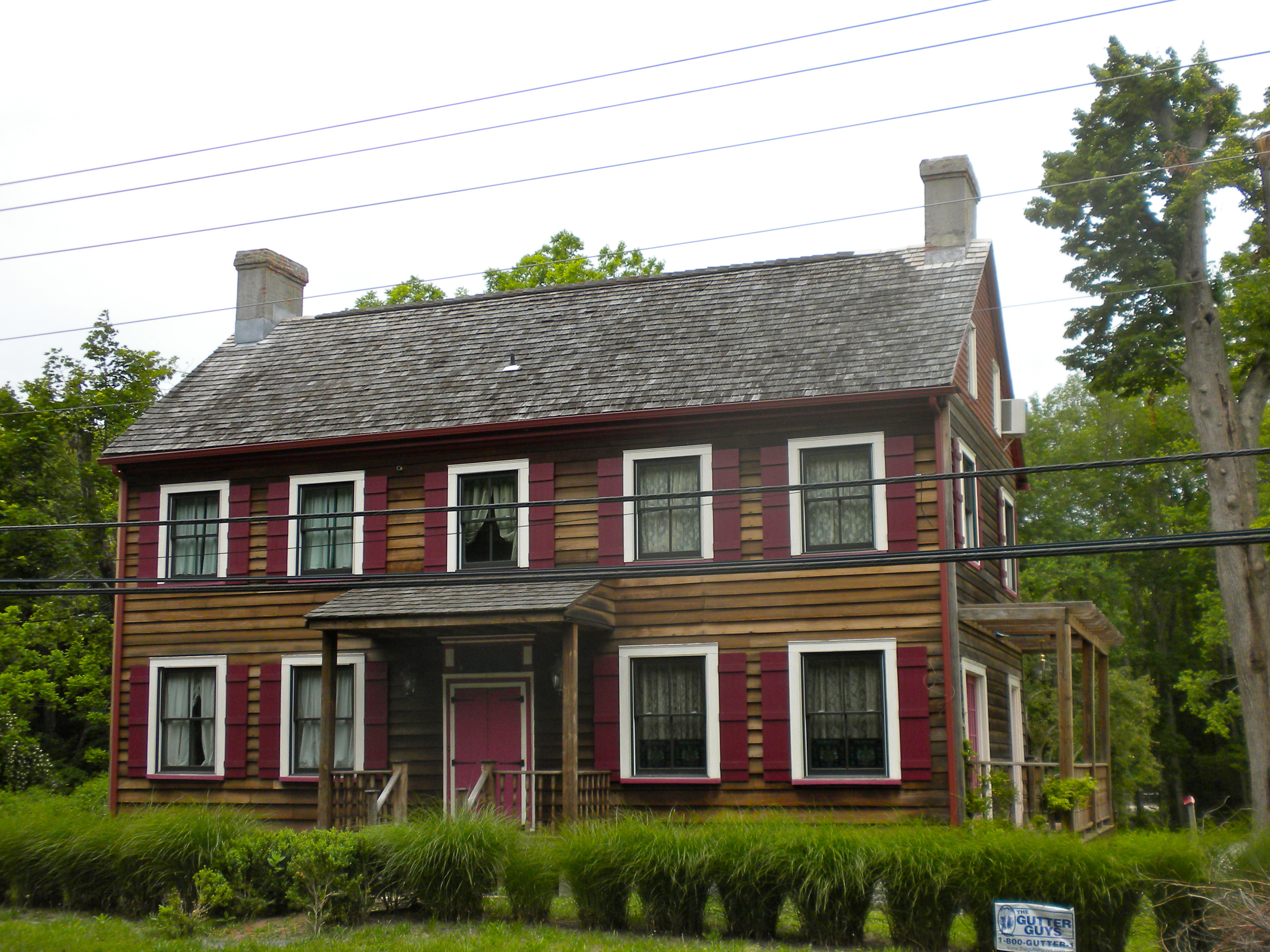

- Location within Cape May County, New Jersey Location within New Jersey Location within the United States
- Nearest city: Dennisville, New Jersey
- Coordinates: 39°11′43″N 74°50′31″W
- Area: 0.7 acres (0.28 ha)
- Architectural style: Federal
- NRHP reference No.: 93000826
- NJRHP No.: 994

Significant dates
- Added to NRHP: August 12, 1993
- Designated NJRHP: July 7, 1993

Henry Ludlam House is located in the Dennisville section of Dennis Township in Cape May County, New Jersey, United States. The house was added to the National Register of Historic Places on August 12, 1993.

== See also ==
- National Register of Historic Places listings in Cape May County, New Jersey
