= John Corson Jr. House =

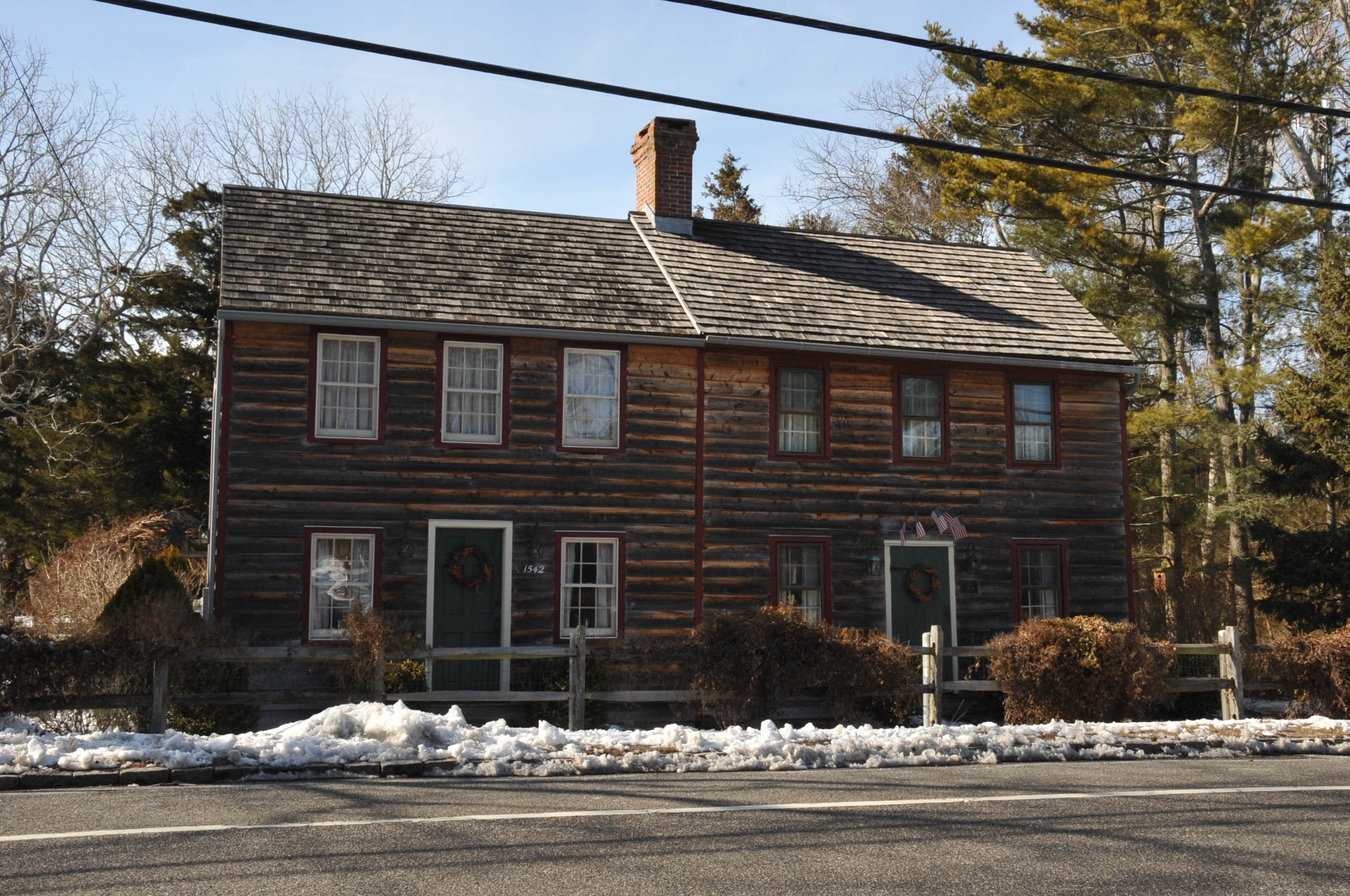
- Interactive map of the John Corson Jr. House area

General information
- Location: 1542 Shore Road, Upper Township, New Jersey
- Coordinates: 39°13′46″N 74°41′09.3″W
- Year built: c. 1710

New Jersey Register of Historic Places
- Designated: April 28, 2006
- Reference no.: 4727

The John Corson Jr. House is located at 1542 Shore Road (U.S. Route 9) in Upper Township of Cape May County, New Jersey, United States. The oldest part of the house was built around 1710. It was listed on the New Jersey Register of Historic Places in 2006.

A 300-acre (120 ha) plot was purchased here, then in the Province of West Jersey, by John Corson Sr. in 1695. The property was divided between his three sons, Andrew, Jacob, and John Corson Jr., who probably built the house around 1710. After his death in 1739, his son David Corson inherited it. In 1811, he divided the property among his ten children.

== Archaeological site ==
- John Corson Jr. House Site
- U.S. National Register of Historic Places
- New Jersey Register of Historic Places
- Area: 0.33 acres (0.13 ha)
- NRHP reference No.: 06000686
- NJRHP No.: 5423

Significant dates
- Added to NRHP: February 12, 2015
- Designated NJRHP: December 17, 2014

The John Corson Jr. House Site is a 0.33-acre (0.13 ha) archaeological site located on the property. It was added to the National Register of Historic Places on February 12, 2015. According to the nomination form, the site is significant in archaeology for "its potential to contribute important information, absent in historic documents and accounts, about southern New Jersey's dispersed farm settlements, trade patterns and consumerism, agricultural practices, and diet." Note, the house is listed as a non-contributing building.

== See also ==
- National Register of Historic Places listings in Cape May County, New Jersey
- List of the oldest buildings in New Jersey
