= Marine National Bank =

- U.S. National Register of Historic Places
- New Jersey Register of Historic Places
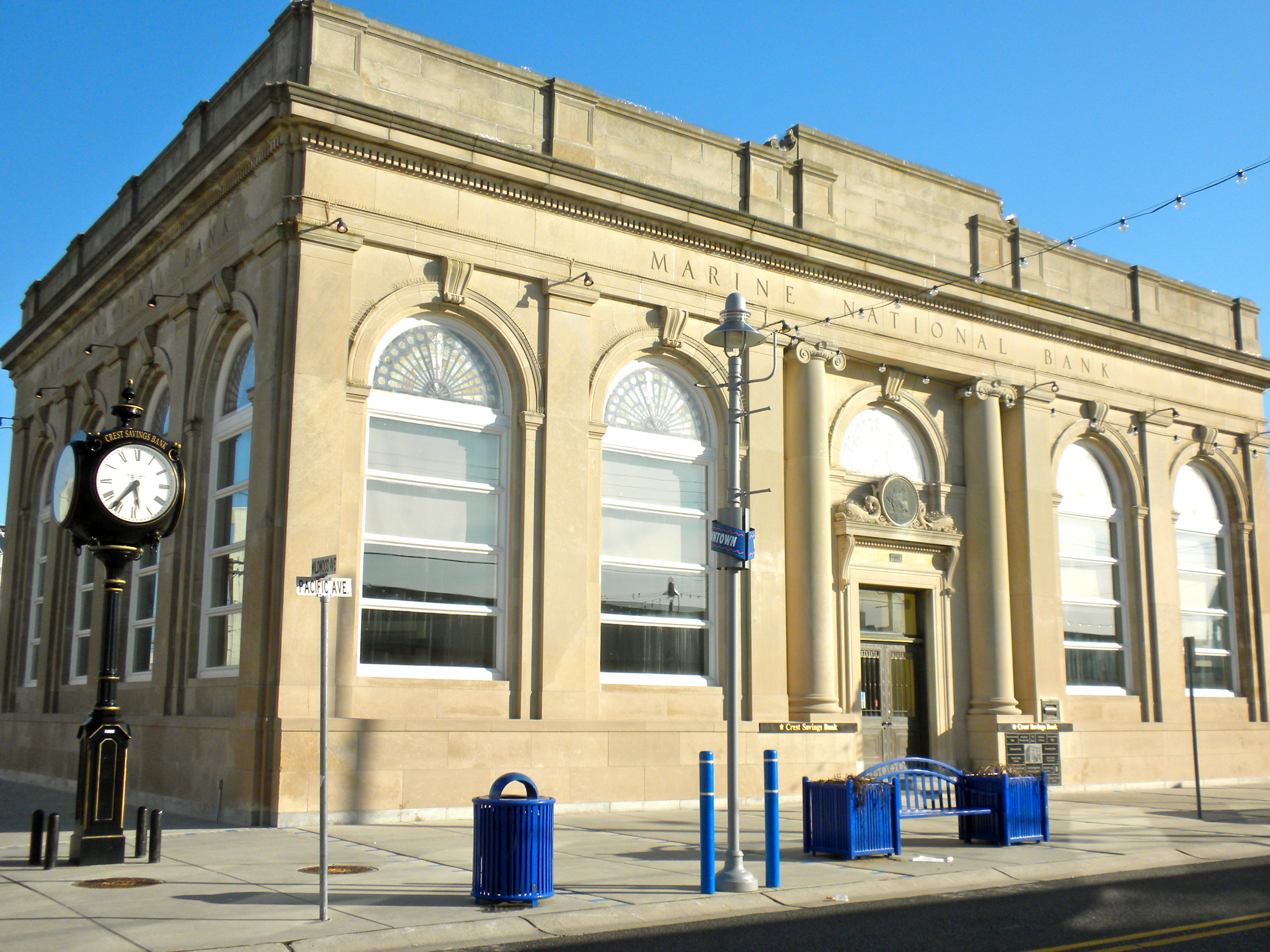

- Location within Cape May County, New Jersey Location within New Jersey Location within the United States
- Location: 3301 Pacific Avenue, Wildwood, New Jersey
- Coordinates: 38°59′24″N 74°48′47″W
- Area: 0.4 acres (0.16 ha)
- Built: 1908
- Architect: Morgan, French & Co.; Witte, Henry
- Architectural style: Classical Revival
- NRHP reference No.: 00001494
- NJRHP No.: 3700

Significant dates
- Added to NRHP: December 20, 2000
- Designated NJRHP: December 27, 2000

Marine National Bank is located in Wildwood, Cape May County, New Jersey, United States. The building was first built in 1908. In 1927 it was rebuilt and doubled in size. It was added to the National Register of Historic Places on December 20, 2000.

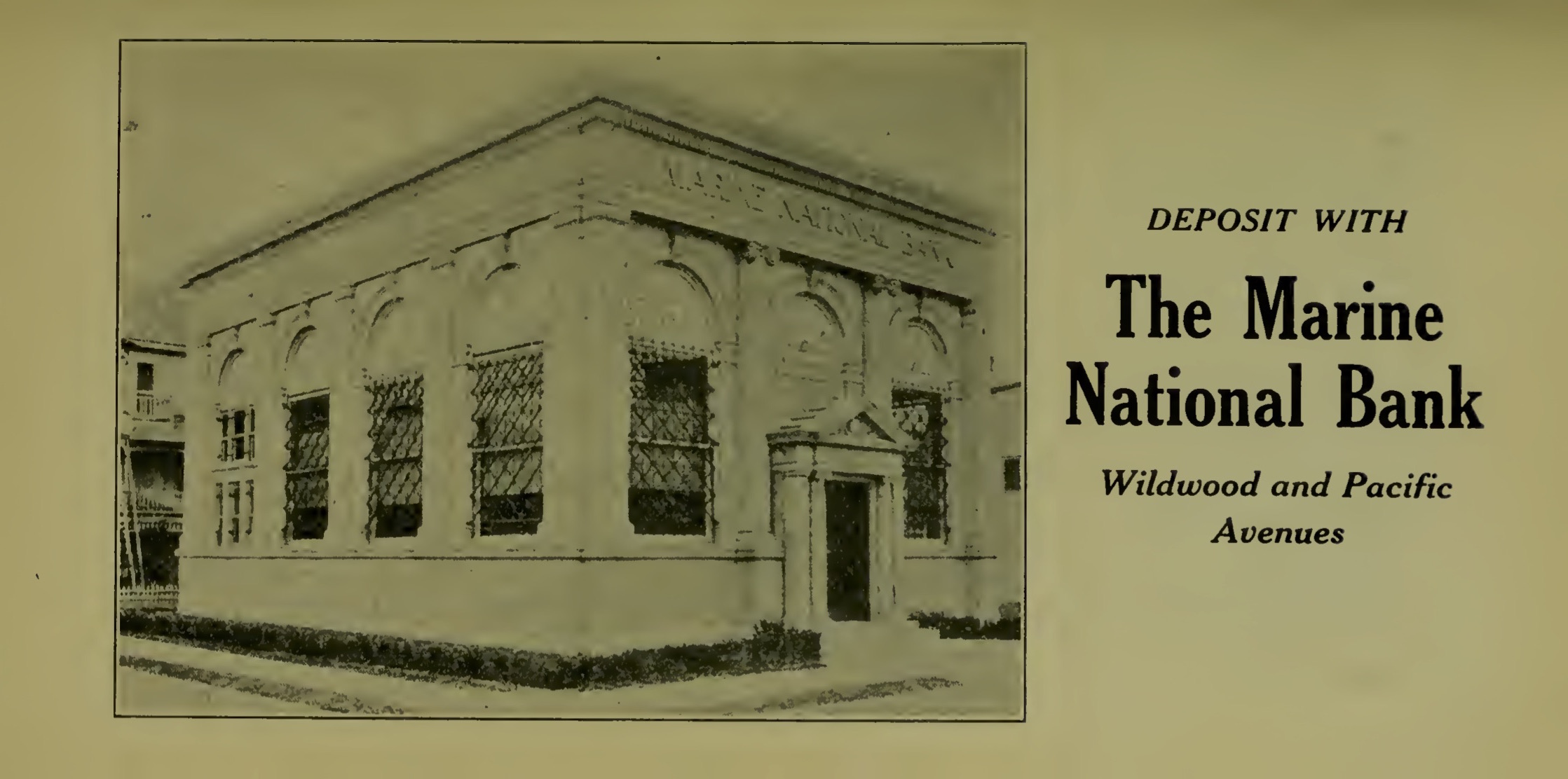
Earlier bank on the site, built 1908. From King's Guide to Wildwood (1915)

== See also ==
- National Register of Historic Places listings in Cape May County, New Jersey
