= Thomas Ludlam Jr. House =

Historic house in New Jersey, United States

- U.S. National Register of Historic Places
- New Jersey Register of Historic Places
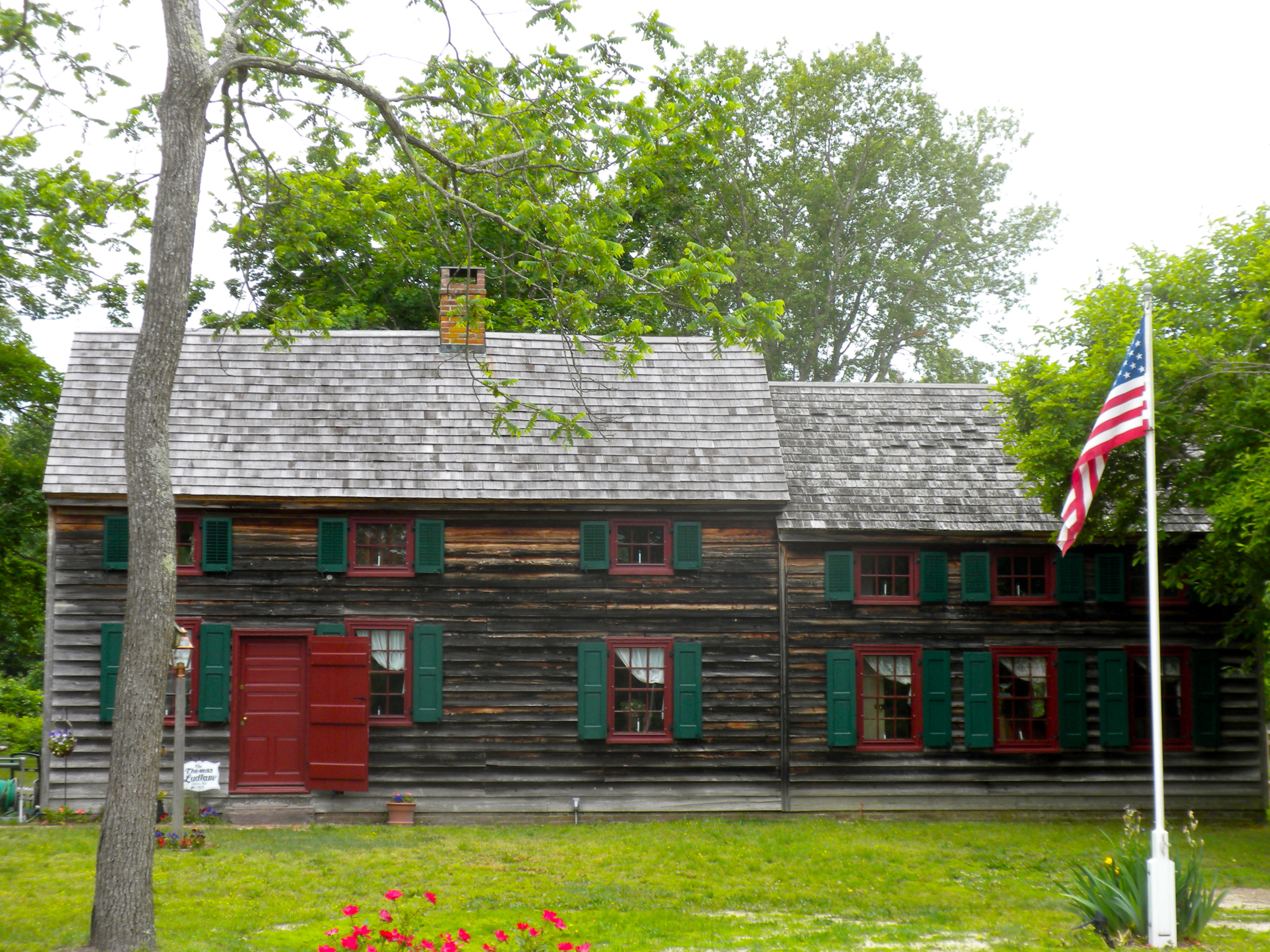

- Location within Cape May County, New Jersey Location within New Jersey Location within the United States
- Location: 707 NJ 47, Dennis Township, New Jersey
- Coordinates: 39°10′9″N 74°49′31″W
- Area: 0.7 acres (0.28 ha)
- Built: 1790
- Architectural style: Postmedieval English
- NRHP reference No.: 04001261
- NJRHP No.: 4377

Significant dates
- Added to NRHP: November 26, 2004
- Designated NJRHP: August 28, 2004

Thomas Ludlam Jr. House is located in Dennis Township, Cape May County, New Jersey, United States. The house was built in 1790 and was added to the National Register of Historic Places on November 26, 2004.

== See also ==
- National Register of Historic Places listings in Cape May County, New Jersey
