= Joseph Falkinburg House =

Historic house in New Jersey, United States

- U.S. National Register of Historic Places
- New Jersey Register of Historic Places
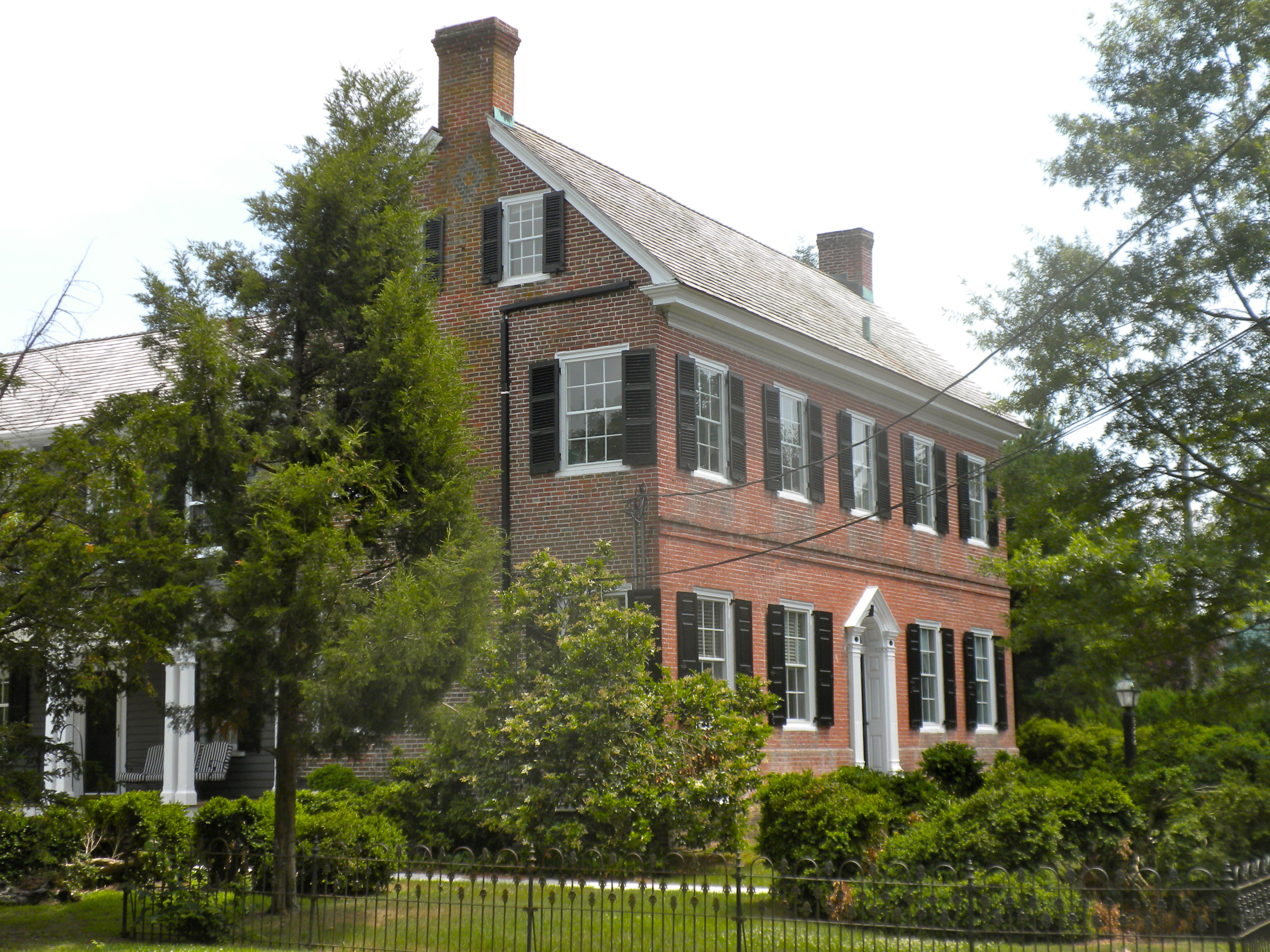
- Joseph Falkinburg House in 2010.

- Location within Cape May County, New Jersey Location within New Jersey Location within the United States
- Location: 822 Delsea Drive, Dennis Township, New Jersey
- Coordinates: 39°10′22″N 74°49′15″W
- Area: 8 acres (3.2 ha)
- Built: c. 1805
- Architectural style: Italianate, Georgian, Federal
- NRHP reference No.: 94001153
- NJRHP No.: 992

Significant dates
- Added to NRHP: October 3, 1994
- Designated NJRHP: August 8, 1994

The Joseph Falkinburg House, also spelled Falkenburg, is located at 822 (historically 922) Delsea Drive (New Jersey Route 47) in the South Dennis section of Dennis Township in Cape May County, New Jersey, United States. The historic brick Federal style house was built around 1805 and was documented by the Historic American Buildings Survey (HABS) in 1961. It was added to the National Register of Historic Places on October 3, 1994, for its significance in architecture and politics/government.

According to the nomination form, the house is one of three brick houses in the county built before 1860. Joseph Falkinburg served in the New Jersey legislature during the War of 1812. In 1989, the house was purchased by the Arc of Cape May County.

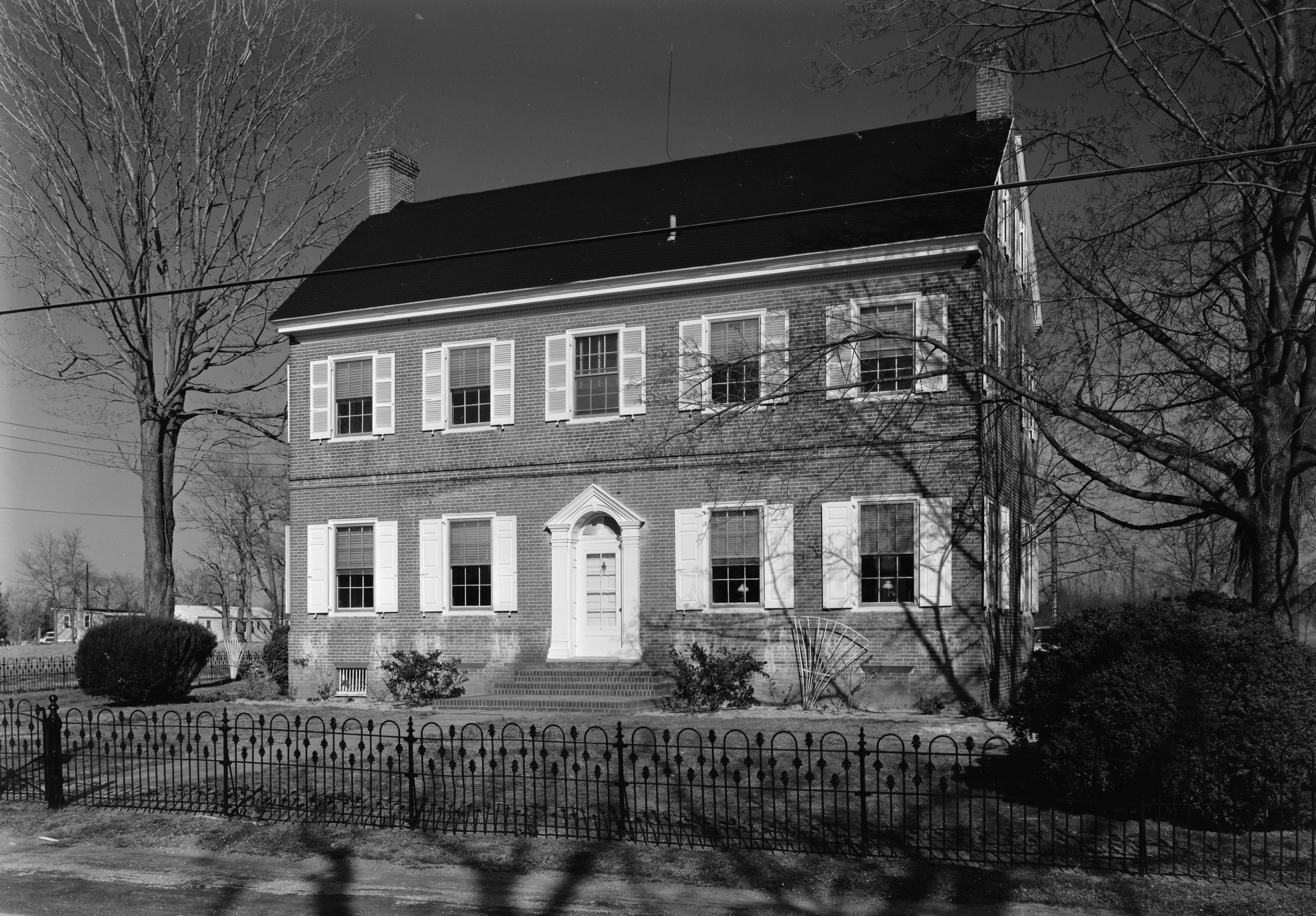
HABS photo from 1961

== See also ==
- National Register of Historic Places listings in Cape May County, New Jersey
