= Naval Air Station Wildwood =

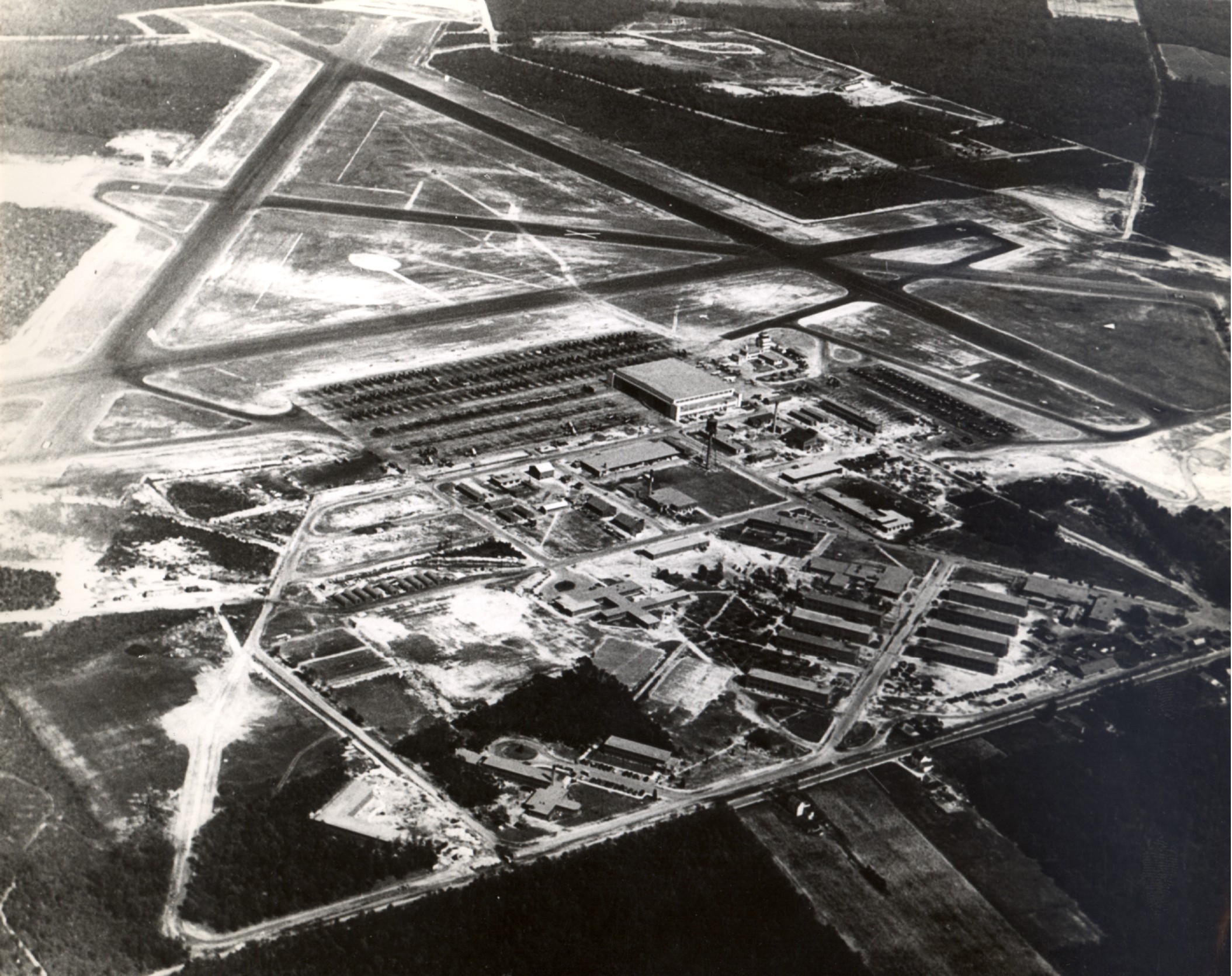
- NAS Wildwood in the 1940s
- IATA: none; ICAO: none

Summary
- Airport type: Military
- Owner: United States Navy
- Location: Lower Township, New Jersey
- Elevation AMSL: 23 ft (7.0 m)
- Coordinates: 39°00′31″N 074°54′30″W

Map
- Location within Cape May County, New Jersey Location within New Jersey Location within the United States

Naval Air Station Wildwood was a United States Navy airport located in Lower Township, Cape May County, New Jersey, United States, about 4 miles (6.4 km) northwest of the central business district of Wildwood, a city in the same county. Former Hangar #1 now contains the Naval Air Station Wildwood Aviation Museum, whose collection focuses on World War II.

== History ==
The airport started in 1941 as NAS Rio Grande, named for its location near Rio Grande, New Jersey. Due to confusion with Rio Grande, Texas, the name was changed to NAS Wildwood in 1943, in relation to Wildwood, New Jersey. Following the end of World War II, Naval Air Station Wildwood was deemed excess to U.S. Navy requirements. It was subsequently deeded to the local government for transition to a civilian airport which is still in operation today as Cape May Airport. The surviving portions of the historic airfield, including its runways and taxiways, were listed on the National Register of Historic Places in 2015.

== Historic district ==
- Naval Air Station Wildwood Historic District
- U.S. National Register of Historic Places
- U.S. Historic district
- New Jersey Register of Historic Places
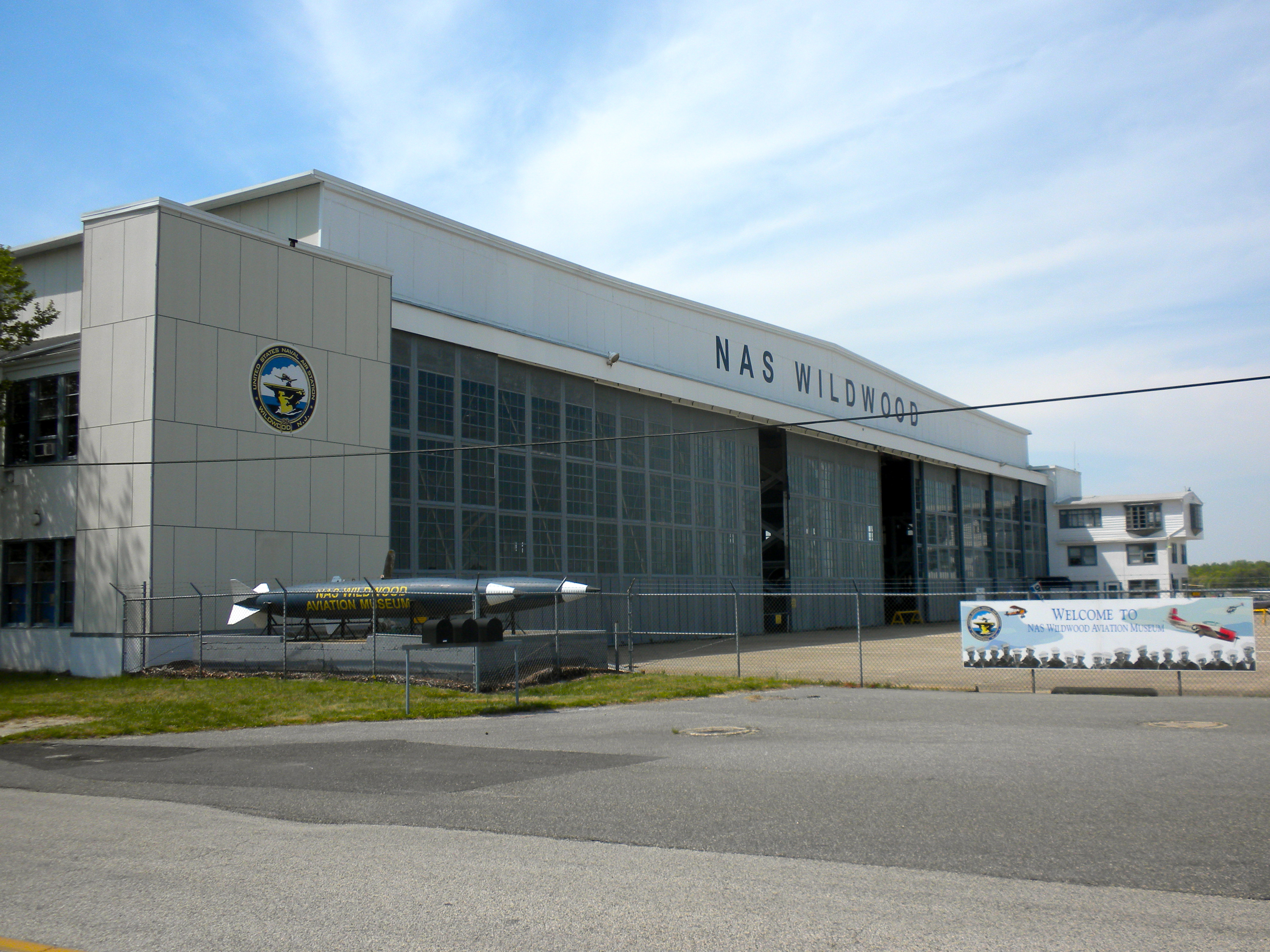
- Hangar No. 1
- Area: 11 acres (4.5 ha)
- NRHP reference No.: 13000945
- NJRHP No.: 4904

Significant dates
- Added to NRHP: July 28, 2015
- Designated NJRHP: August 28, 2013

The Naval Air Station Wildwood Historic District is an 11-acre (4.5 ha) historic district encompassing the airfield, bounded by Forrestal and Monterre Roads, and the runways and taxiways to the north and east. The district includes two contributing buildings and one contributing structure. It was added for its significance in military history from 1942 to 1945.

== See also ==
- National Register of Historic Places listings in Cape May County, New Jersey
