= Judge Nathaniel Foster House =

- U.S. National Register of Historic Places
- New Jersey Register of Historic Places
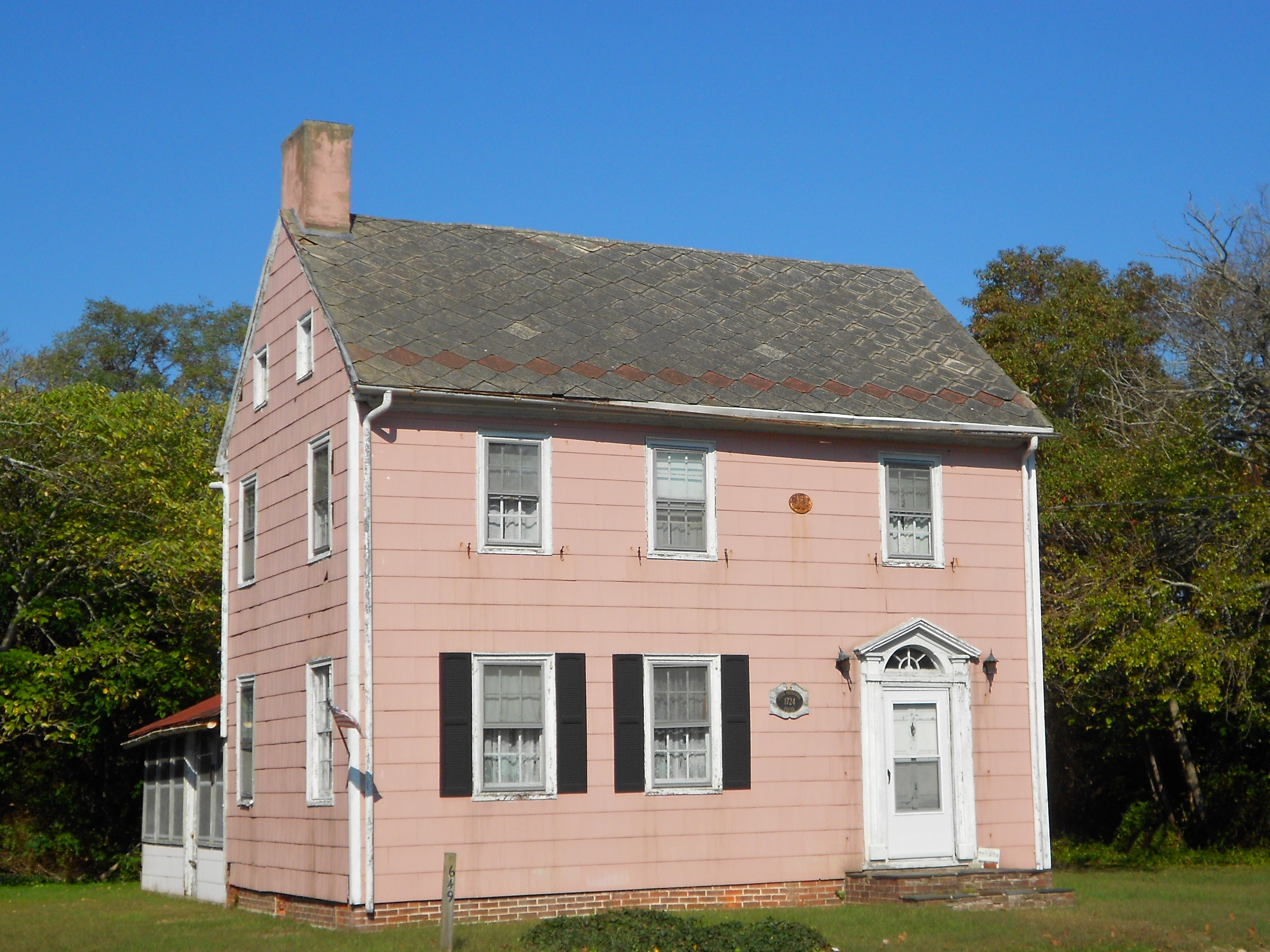

- Location within Cape May County, New Jersey Location within New Jersey Location within the United States
- Location: 1649 Bayshore Drive, Villas, New Jersey
- Coordinates: 39°01′13.5″N 74°56′07.0″W
- Built: c. 1727
- Built by: Nathaniel Foster
- Architectural style: Federal
- NRHP reference No.: 14000516
- NJRHP No.: 1001

Significant dates
- Added to NRHP: August 25, 2014
- Designated NJRHP: June 28, 2014

The Judge Nathaniel Foster House is located at 1649 Bayshore Drive in the Villas section of Lower Township in Cape May County, New Jersey, United States. The historic house was built around 1727 by Nathaniel Foster and was added to the National Register of Historic Places on August 25, 2014, for its significance in architecture. According to the nomination form, it is an example of a well-preserved heavy timber frame house.

Nathaniel Foster was appointed a justice of the peace in 1739 and held that position until 1768. After his death in 1769, his son, Salathiel Foster, inherited the property. After his death in 1792, his son, Salathiel Foster Jr., owned the house. He sold it in 1804 to his nephew, Reuben Foster Jr., a carpenter. He likely remodeled the house around 1826 with Federal style.

== See also ==
- National Register of Historic Places listings in Cape May County, New Jersey
- List of the oldest buildings in New Jersey
