= Ocean City Life-Saving Station (New Jersey) =

- U.S. National Register of Historic Places
- New Jersey Register of Historic Places
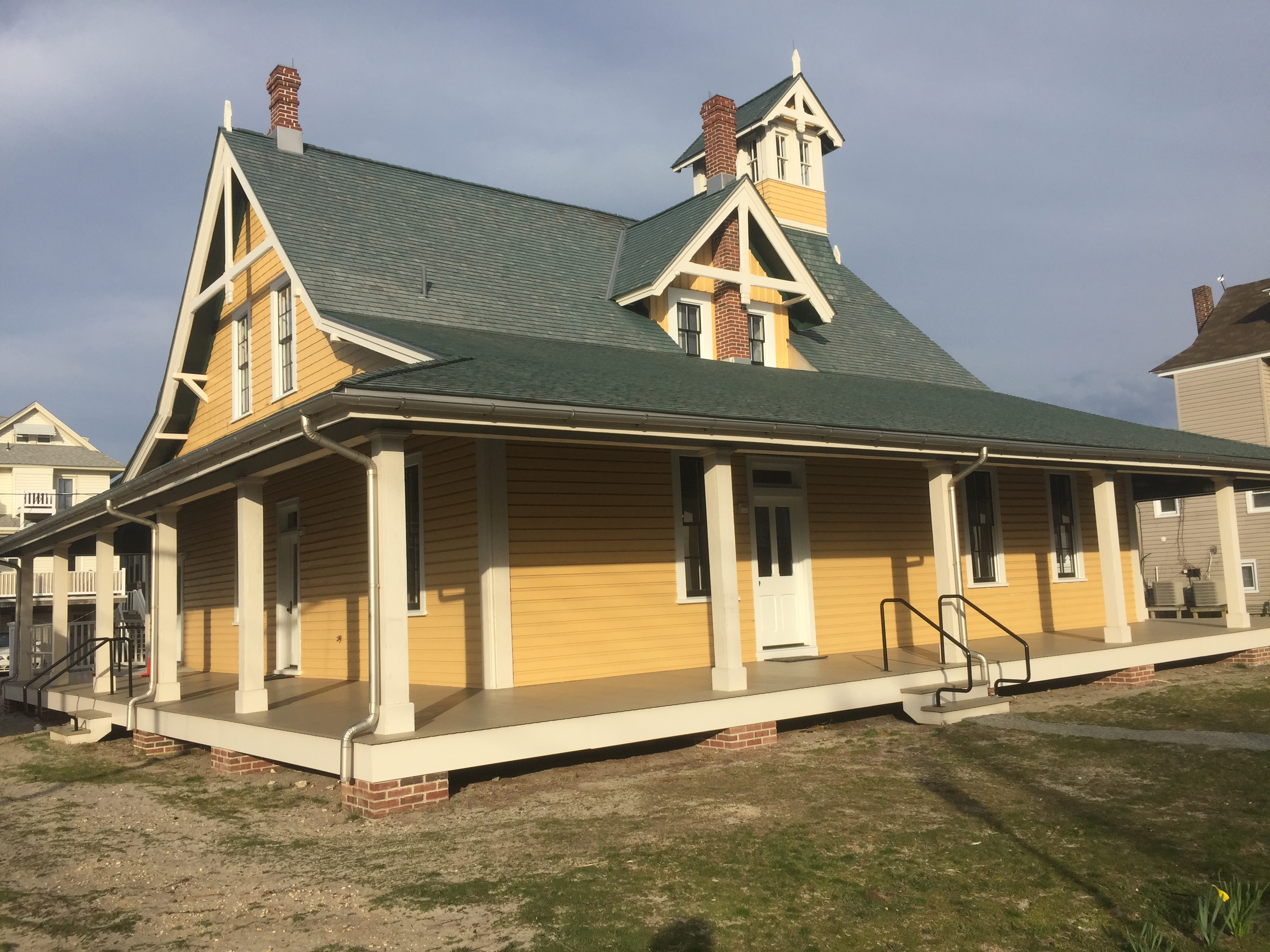
- The life-saving station in 2018

- Location within Cape May County, New Jersey Location within New Jersey Location within the United States
- Location: 801 4th Street, Ocean City, New Jersey
- Coordinates: 39°16′55″N 74°33′56″W
- Area: 0.29 acres (0.12 ha)
- Built: 1886
- Architectural style: Carpenter Gothic
- NRHP reference No.: 13000385
- NJRHP No.: 1594

Significant dates
- Added to NRHP: June 14, 2013
- Designated NJRHP: April 8, 2013

The Ocean City Life-Saving Station (also known as U.S. Life Saving Station 30 and U.S. Coast Guard Station No. 126) is the only life-saving station of its design in New Jersey still in existence. Designed by architect James Lake Parkinson in a Carpenter Gothic style, the building is one of 25 stations built of the 1882 life-saving type. It is also one of six still in existence in the country. Construction on the facility began in September 1885 and was completed in the following year. There were two earlier stations in the northern end of Ocean City before this facility was constructed, and there were two stations farther south on the island.

At 4th Street and Atlantic Avenue, the life-saving station was originally near the beach, but sand gradually accumulated, such that it is currently about 1/4 mi (400 m) from the coast. In December 1936, the facility was shut down in favor of the larger Great Egg Coast Guard Station, across Great Egg Harbor Inlet. The United States Coast Guard continued to own the property, utilizing it during World War II to store equipment and personnel who patrolled the beach for German submarines and spies. In October 1945, the Coast Guard sold the life-saving station, and for 54 years the building served as a private residence. From 1999 to 2010, a developer sought to demolish the building in favor of constructing three duplexes. After legal battles and intervention from local historic groups, Ocean City purchased the property in May 2010. After a $1.5 million renovation, the life-saving station reopened on December 31, 2017, and six months later reopened as the Ocean City Life-Saving Museum.

== Background ==
During the early 19th century, shipwrecks were common along the New Jersey coast, due to the poor conditions of lighthouses, markers, and coastal maps. Shipwrecks were so common in the 1840s that shipping underwriters appointed agents to salvage wrecks along the shore towns. The first permanent resident of Ocean City was Parker Miller in 1859, who was an agent for marine insurance companies. Congressman William A. Newell, representing coastal New Jersey in the House of Representatives, helped pass the Newell Act in 1848, which secured $10,000 in funding for lifeboats and unnamed life saving stations. The first of these was built in Ocean City in 1853 or 1854, one of 22 stations along the coast. Named "Pecks Beach North", the station was near the current building on the northern end of the island, near the Great Egg Harbor Inlet along the beach. Corson Inlet Station was built in 1855 at the south end of Ocean City at what is now 58th Street, and was replaced by a newer facility in 1899. As with other stations during this time period, Pecks Beach North station deteriorated due to lack of funds for repairs. During that time, crews were usually untrained, often had a poor response time, and were led by political appointees.

After a series of shipwrecks in the winter of 1870–1871, the U.S. Congress authorized funds to put trained crews at every station and repair buildings. In 1872, a larger station house was built at the corner of 5th Street and Ocean Avenue, named Beazley's Station, to replace the original 1854 station. In the same year, Pecks Beach Station was built at what is now 36th Street and Wesley Avenue, which was replaced by a newer facility in 1899. In 1878, Ocean City's three life-saving stations fell under the jurisdiction of the newly created United States Life-Saving Service, and Beazley's Station became U.S. Life Saving Station 30. In 1883, Beazley's Station was officially renamed to Ocean City Station, and in the same year, the facility's roof began leaking as the structure deteriorated. The U.S. Life-Saving Service provided funds for repairs in 1884. Instead of repairing Ocean City Station, the Life-Saving Service leased a lot in January 1855 to construct a new building. The flat and grassy lot measured 100 ft (30 m) by 130 ft (40 m), or 0.29 acres (0.12 ha), and was along the beach at the northeast corner of 4th Street and Atlantic Avenue, at 801 4th Street.

== Construction and usage ==
Construction on the new Ocean City Life-Saving Station began on September 17, 1885. It was an 1882-Type lifeguard station of Carpenter Gothic style, one of 25 stations built that were designed by architect James Lake Parkinson. In 1886, the new Ocean City Station was finished, and the crew moved in on May 28. Standing one-and-a-half stories tall, the station house was made of wood. It sat on a foundation made of 4 ft (1.2 m) high pilings and mudsills, on a foundation of logs, concrete, and brick. The rectangular building measures 61 ft (19 m) by 55 ft (17 m). The walls are made of weatherboard and shingles. There is also a one-story lookout tower. The gable dormer roof is laced with asphalt shingles, and attached is a brick chimney. There are four rectangular concrete pads in the southwest periphery of the lot, possibly supports for a flag pole.

In 1895, a storage shed was added, and over time, the wooden pilings were replaced with concrete. The building was expanded on the northern and southern sides in 1905, and a porch was added on the west, south, and a portion of the east sides. In 1915, the newly created United States Coast Guard, the successor to the U.S. Life-Saving Service which had operated the station since its inception, took over the building, which became known as U.S. Coast Guard Station No. 126. Some time before 1925, sidewalks were added on the west and south sides. A perimeter post and rail fence also existed on the property some time between 1895 and 1931. Over time, the beach accrued sand and moved the coast eastward to its current distance, about 1/4 mi (400 m) from the station. In December 1936, the Ocean City Life-Saving Station was shut down due to its isolation from the beach and presence in a neighborhood. The Coast Guard kept ownership of the Ocean City property, and utilized the larger Great Egg Coast Guard Station, 1.5 mi (2.4 km) to the north across the Great Egg Harbor Inlet.

The building was reopened during World War II in late 1941 to store equipment and personnel who patrolled the beach for German submarines and spies. The station was shut down again in the spring of 1945 after the war ended. During its operation, 62 men served at the station. In October 1945, the Coast Guard sold the building to be used as a private residence for a single-family home. Of the 25 life-saving stations constructed of the 1882 design, the Ocean City station is the only one still in existence in New Jersey, and one of only six in the United States.

== Private residence and restoration ==
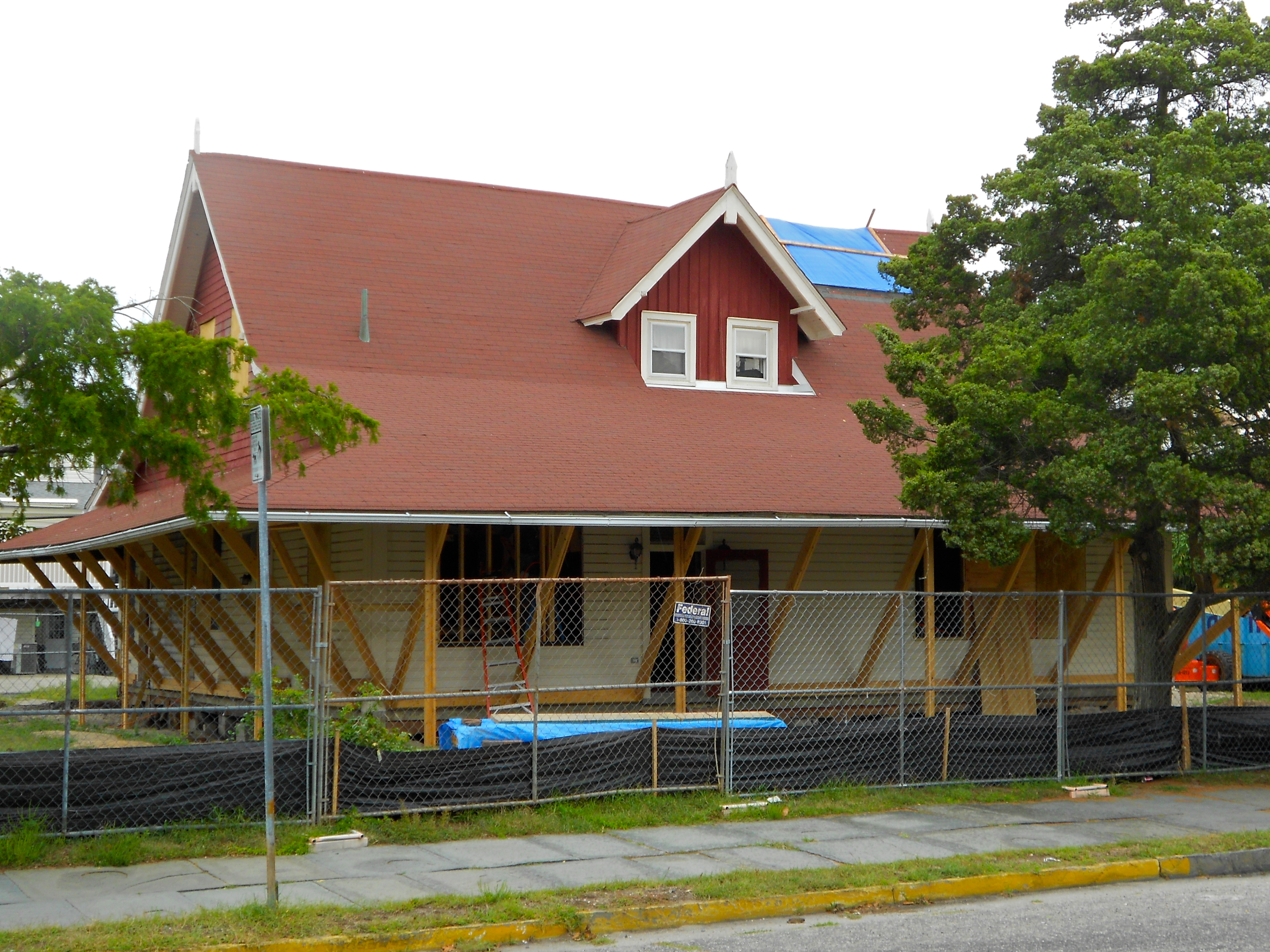
The building under restoration in 2013

At some point after the building became a private residence, a few medium-sized trees were planted. In the 1940s or 1950s, the lookout tower was demolished, but it was re-added in the 1970s to resemble the original tower. The 1895 storage shed was used at one point as a car garage. In 1968, a concrete pad was installed north of the building, connecting it with an adjacent alley.

In February 1999, Ocean City's Historic Preservation Commission denied the property's owner a permit to demolish the wings of the building. The city consulted architectural firm Watson & Henry Associates for the feasibility to move the property, but the firm advised against it. The Citizens for Historic Preservation filed a lawsuit to stop the building from being relocated, and the Cape May County Superior Court issued a stay on demolition. On May 27, 1999, Elizabeth Sheehan sold the property to Roger Parkin and Pansini Custom Design Associates, LLC for $710,000. The intention was to demolish the building and build three duplexes. In July 1999, Ocean City's council rejected an $807,500 bond ordinance to purchase the property. On April 9, 2001, the New Jersey Register of Historic Places granted a Certification of Eligibility to the property, and Ocean City also designated the property as a historic structure. This meant that the developer had to comply with city zoning ordinances. For eight years, Parkin and Pansini attempted to sell the property, but a historical preservation group Saving Our Station fought the sale in court. In 2005, the developers offered to sell the property to Ocean City for $3 million, which the city council approved. Mayor Bud Knight vetoed the ordinance, and the council overrode the veto. Residents put the bond ordinance to a referendum on November 8, 2005, which was defeated by 75% of the voters.

In early 2006, Parkin and Pansini offered to donate the property to Ocean City and $500,000 to move and restore the station, which the city council approved in February 2006. The deal was contingent on approval from the Coastal Areas Facility Review Act. In 2007, New Jersey Superior Court averaged various property assessments for a fair market value of $1,072,500, and ruled that the property could be demolished if not sold within six months. The Saving Our Station group appealed to the New Jersey Superior Court, Appellate Division, which ruled in May 2009 that averaging various property assessments was an inappropriate determination of market value. In November 2009, Parkin and Pansini and Saving Our Station agreed on a market price of $887,500. In March 2010, the Ocean City council approved $910,575 in bonds to purchase the property, and the city took over the former life-saving station on May 13. A nonprofit organization U.S. Life Saving Station 30 was formed to seek grants to support building repairs. In 2011, the New Jersey Historic Trust nonprofit provided the city $750,000. The city also received $190,000 in Community Development Block Grants to restore the structure.

On April 8, 2013, the Ocean City Life-Saving Station was listed on the state historic registry, and on June 14 of that year, it was listed on the National Register of Historic Places. Beginning in May 2013, Ocean City issued a series of contracts to restore the building to its condition in 1906 and turn it into a museum. The overall cost for repairs and restoration was estimated at $1.5 million. The work consisted of restoring original light bulbs, replacing posts, fixing sidewalks, improved support for the roof, Americans with Disabilities Act accessibility, improved ventilation, removing sand, new service for water, gas, and sewage, and repairing damage caused by Hurricane Sandy in 2012. On December 31, 2017, the Ocean City Life-Saving Station was reopened for the city's annual First Night celebration. The facility formally reopened as the Life-Saving Museum on Memorial Day in 2018.

== See also ==
- National Register of Historic Places listings in Cape May County, New Jersey
  - Avalon Life Saving Station
  - U.S. Life-Saving Station No. 35 – in Stone Harbor
- Ocean City Life-Saving Station (Maryland)
