= South Tuckahoe Historic District =

Historic district in New Jersey, United States

- U.S. National Register of Historic Places
- U.S. Historic district
- New Jersey Register of Historic Places
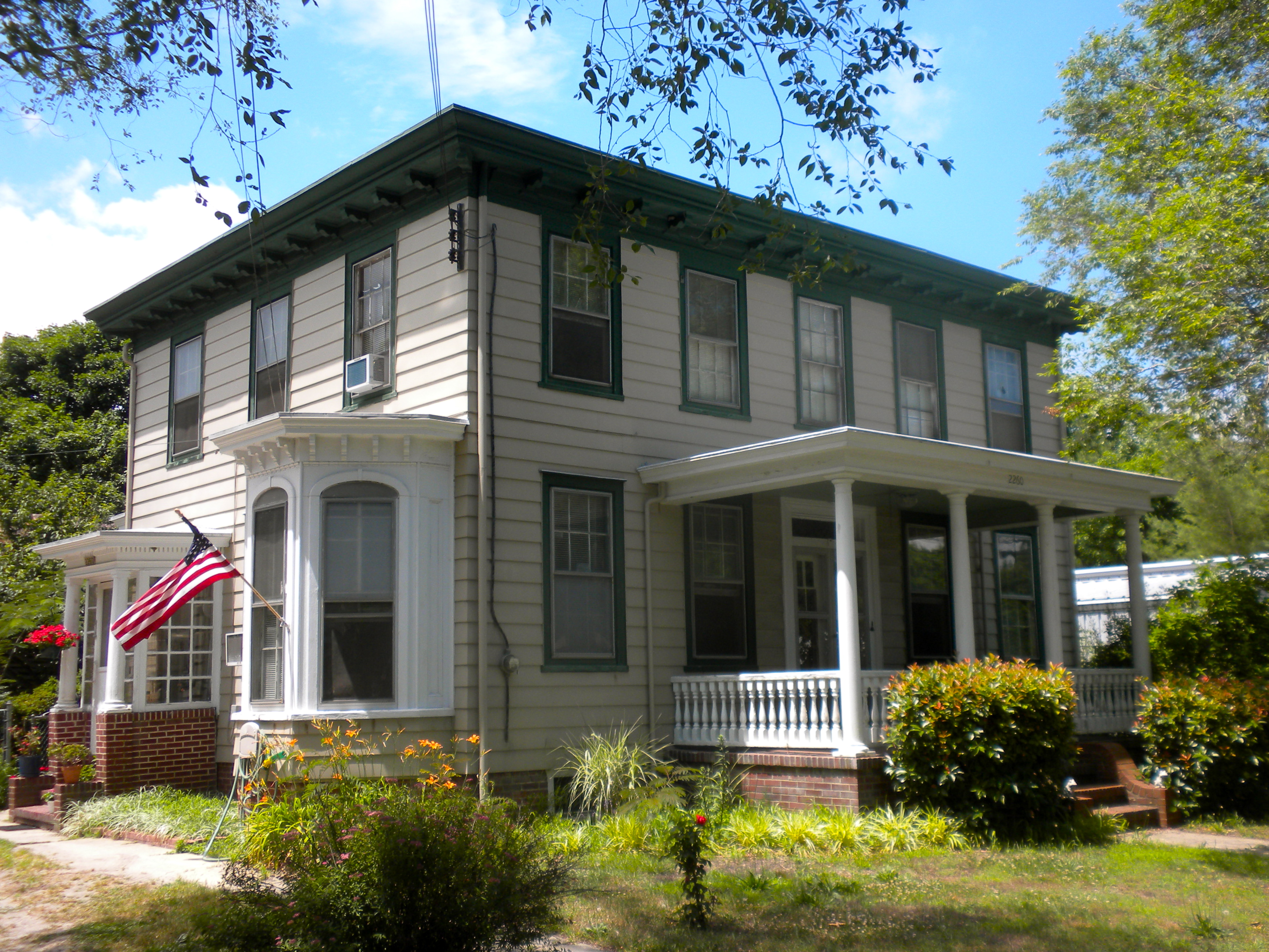

- Location within Cape May County, New Jersey Location within New Jersey Location within the United States
- Nearest city: Tuckahoe, New Jersey
- Coordinates: 39°17′20″N 74°45′10″W
- Area: 74.4 acres (30.1 ha)
- Built: 1893
- Architectural style: Federal, Gothic Revival, Italianate
- NRHP reference No.: 97000103
- NJRHP No.: 3062

Significant dates
- Added to NRHP: March 7, 1997
- Designated NJRHP: January 8, 1997

South Tuckahoe Historic District is located in the Tuckahoe section of Upper Township, New Jersey, United States. The district was added to the National Register of Historic Places on March 7, 1997.

== See also ==
- National Register of Historic Places listings in Cape May County, New Jersey
