= Cape May Airport =

Airport in Lower Township, New Jersey, United States

Cape May Airport Cape May County Airport
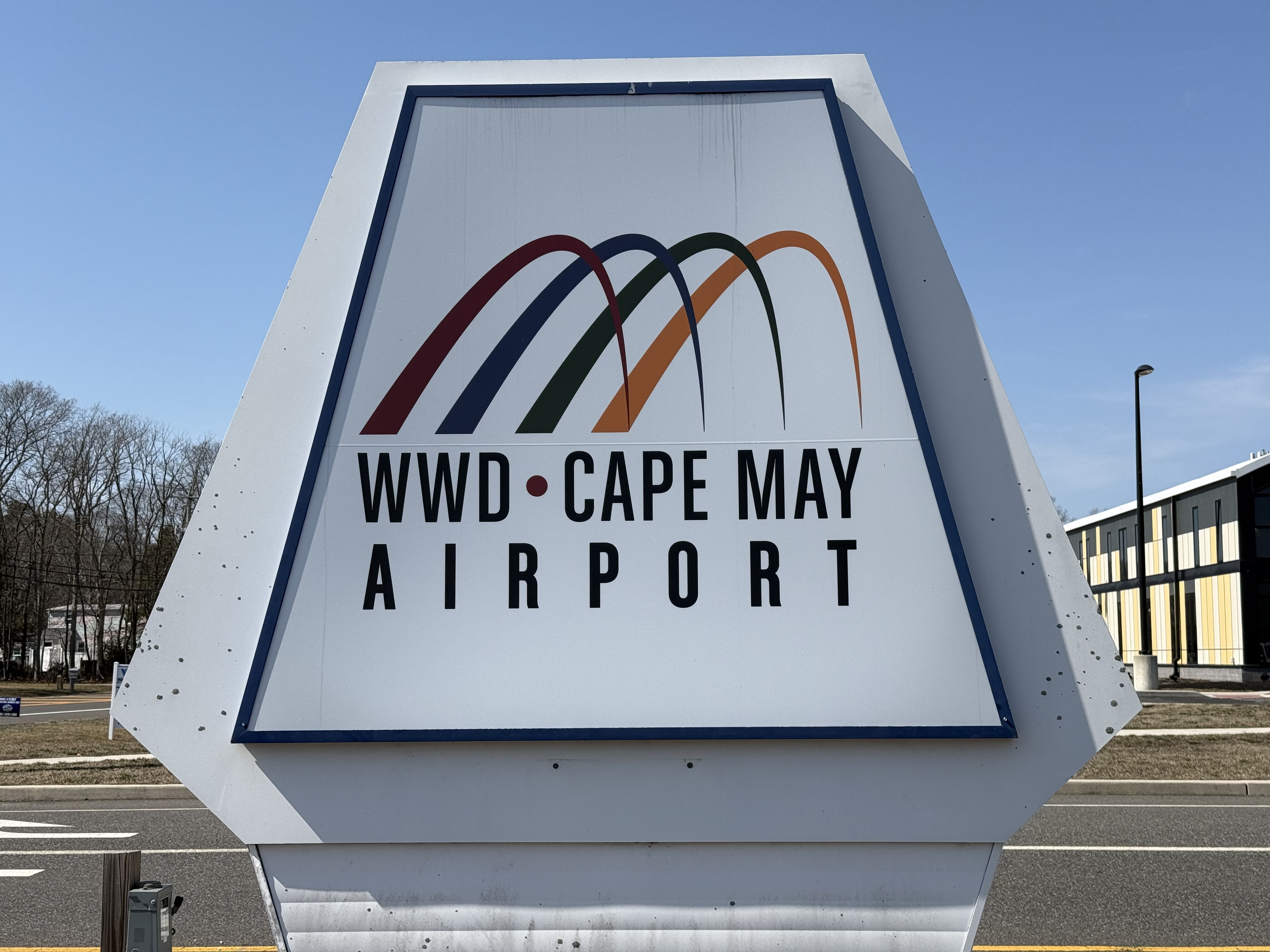

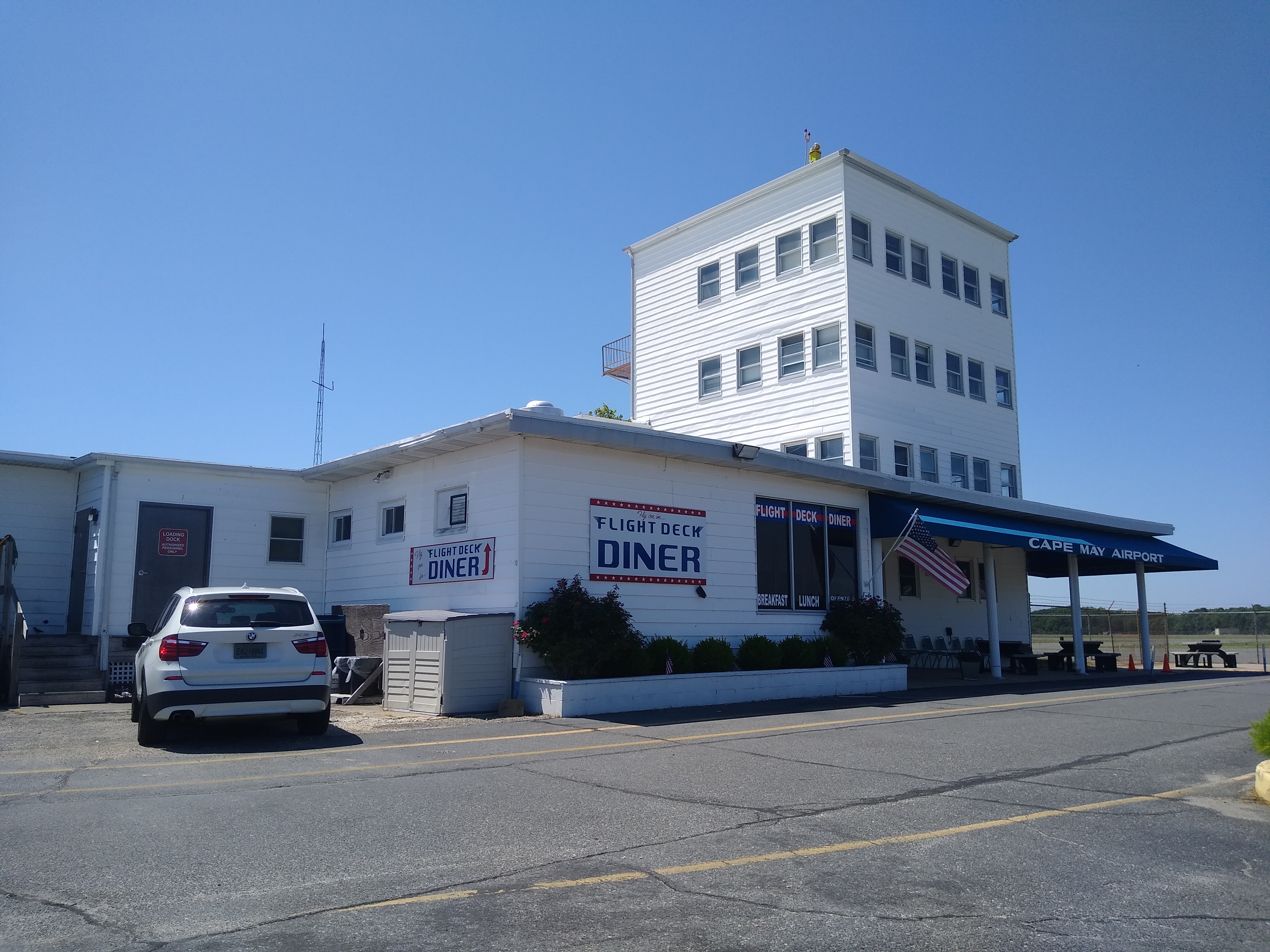
- Administration Building behind Flight Deck Diner
- IATA: WWD; ICAO: KWWD; FAA LID: WWD

Summary
- Airport type: Public
- Owner: Delaware River and Bay Authority
- Serves: Cape May, New Jersey; Wildwood, New Jersey
- Location: Lower Township, New Jersey
- Elevation AMSL: 21 ft (6.4 m)
- Coordinates: 39°00′31″N 074°54′31″W
- Website: CapeMayAirport.com

Map
- Interactive map of Cape May Airport

Runways
Direction	Length		Surface
Direction	ft	m	Surface
1/19	5,252	1,601	Asphalt
10/28	5,000	1,524	Asphalt

Statistics (2022)
- Aircraft operations: 40,075
- Based aircraft: 40
- Sources: FAA, NJDOT, DRBA

Cape May Airport or Cape May County Airport (IATA: WWD, ICAO: KWWD, FAA LID: WWD) is a public use airport in Lower Township, Cape May County, New Jersey, United States. Owned by the Delaware River and Bay Authority, the airport is four nautical miles (7 km) northwest of the central business district of Wildwood.

The airport is located near the Rio Grande census-designated place (CDP), which is mostly in Middle Township and partly in Lower Township. The airport has an Erma address but is not in the CDP. In some documents it is called Wildwood Airport.

This airport is included in the National Plan of Integrated Airport Systems for 2011–2015, which categorized it as a general aviation facility.

Hangar #1 contains the Naval Air Station Wildwood Aviation Museum, whose collection focuses on World War II, named after the former Naval Air Station Wildwood.

== History ==
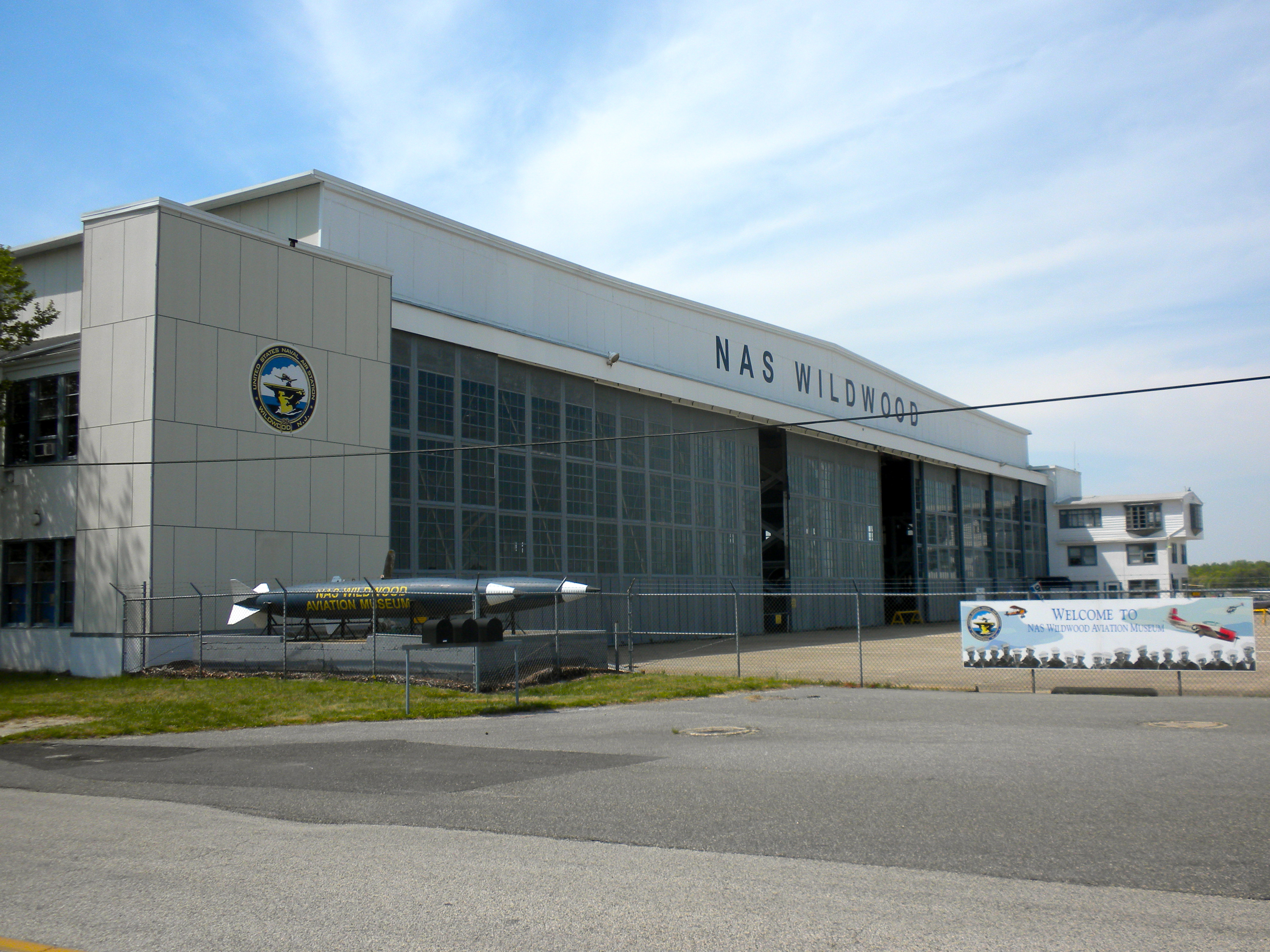
Hangar No. 1, on the National Register of Historic Places

The airport started in 1941 as NAS Rio Grande, named for its location near Rio Grande, New Jersey. Due to confusion with Rio Grande, Texas, the name was changed to NAS Wildwood in 1943. Following the end of World War II, Naval Air Station Wildwood was deemed excess to U.S. Navy requirements. It was subsequently deeded to the local government for transition to a civilian airport which is still in operation today as Cape May County Airport.

The airport was the headquarters and homebase for United States Overseas Airlines (USOA), a supplemental air carrier that operated in Cape May from 1950 through 1964 and at one point employed over 500 people. In 1977, a dozen derelict USOA aircraft were still present at the airport being cut up for scrap. USOA operated both charter and some limited scheduled flights, including across the Pacific Ocean to Okinawa.

The County of Cape May owns the land. As of 2024 Delaware River and Bay Authority (DRBA) operates the airport under a lease. This lease does not automatically renew itself. Representatives of the County attended a DRBA meeting and stated that they felt the DRBA board did not give them good treatment, so Cape May County Board of County Commissioners head Leonard Desiderio stated that he was looking for a different agency to manage the airport.

== Facilities and aircraft ==
Cape May County Airport covers an area of 996 acres (403 ha) at an elevation of 21 feet (6 m) above mean sea level. It has two runways with asphalt surfaces: 1/19 is 5,252 by 150 feet (1,601 x 46 m) and 10/28 is 5,000 by 150 feet (1,523 x 46 m).

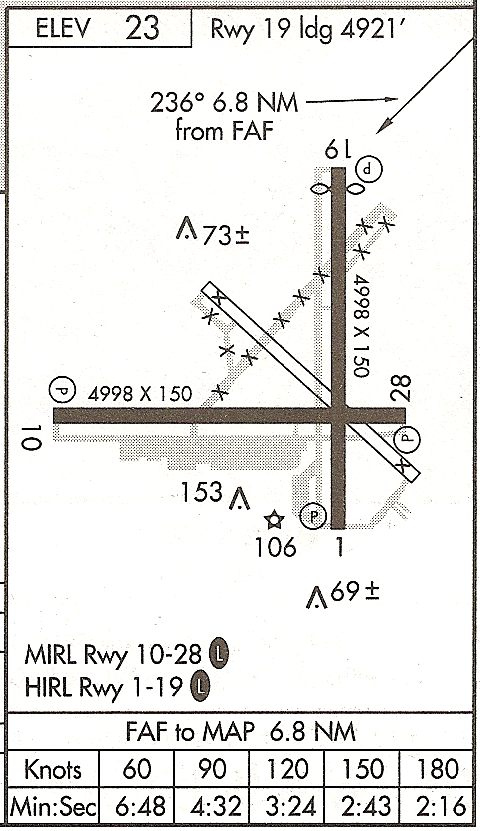
FAA runway diagram

For the 12-month period ending December 31, 2022, the airport had 40,075 aircraft operations, an average of 110 per day: 99% general aviation and 1% military. At that time there were 40 aircraft based at this airport: 38 single-engine, and 2 multi-engine.

FlightLevel Aviation is the current fixed-base operator (FBO) on the field serving general aviation traffic. FBO services include full and self-serve 100LL Avgas, and full-service Jet A fuel.

On-field services include Flight Deck Diner and Kindle Car Rental. Locations off-field include Cape May National Golf Course (2 miles), Lobster House Restaurant (3 miles) and the Wetlands Institute (10 miles).

== Incidents ==
- On December 12, 1976, an Atlantic City Airlines De Havilland Canada DHC-6 Twin Otter operating as Allegheny Commuter Flight 977 crashed short of the runway. Of the two crew members, one died and one sustained serious injuries. Of the passengers, two died and six sustained serious injuries. One seriously injured passenger died one month after the accident, but was counted as a survivor by the National Transportation Safety Board report, because it defined fatalities as individuals who died within seven days of the accident.
- On August 27, 1993, F-16A 82-0990 (call sign MAPLE 91) of the 134th FS, 158th FW, Vermont Air National Guard, USAF was written off when it crash landed and skidded off the runway at the Cape May County Airport. The pilot ejected and landed in a drainage ditch

According to the following extract (albeit redacted/censored) from the official USAF inquiry into the incident:

"On 27 August 1993, (MP) was scheduled as flight lead of a two-ship cross country flight from Burlington IAP, VT to Langley AFB, VA. The flight was to-include air-to-air refuelling followed by Dissimilar Air Combat Tactics (DACT) with F-15 Eagles and landing at the unit's Alert Detachment Base.
The flight departed Burlington IAP, VT at 08:58 local EDT with the call sign of Maple 91. Refuelling with a KC-135 Tanker and DACT with F-15's in MOA (Military Operating Area) W-105 was as scheduled.
During the recovery to Langley AFB, VA, a descent was accomplished from FL 410 to FL 310. Upon levelling out at FL 310 and advancing the throttle the Mishap Pilot (MP) experienced a compressor stall. The MP turned west toward land and accomplished a Unified Fuel Control (UFC) airstart which was successful and gave him idle thrust at 20,000 ft. When the MP again moved the throttle, a second stall occurred passing 17,000 ft. Another UFC air start was accomplished giving the (MP) idle thrust.
The MP concentrated on flying a Simulated Flame Out Approach (SFO) into Cape May County Airport, NJ. The SFO was flown with touchdown at 200 knots IAS, 500 feet from the approach end of runway 01. The total length of the runway is 4,998 feet and the MP was unable to stop the aircraft and initiated a successful ejection prior to the aircraft leaving the paved surface of the runway.
The aircraft continued straight ahead, proceeded across a road, and came to rest in an abandoned landfill approximately 950 feet from the departure end of the runway. The aircraft was destroyed by breakup and post-crash fire".

Note that, as the report is redacted/censored, the pilot involved is not named, and is only referred to as "MP" = "Mishap Pilot".

== See also ==
- National Register of Historic Places listings in Cape May County, New Jersey
- List of airports in New Jersey
