= Naval Air Station Wildwood Aviation Museum =

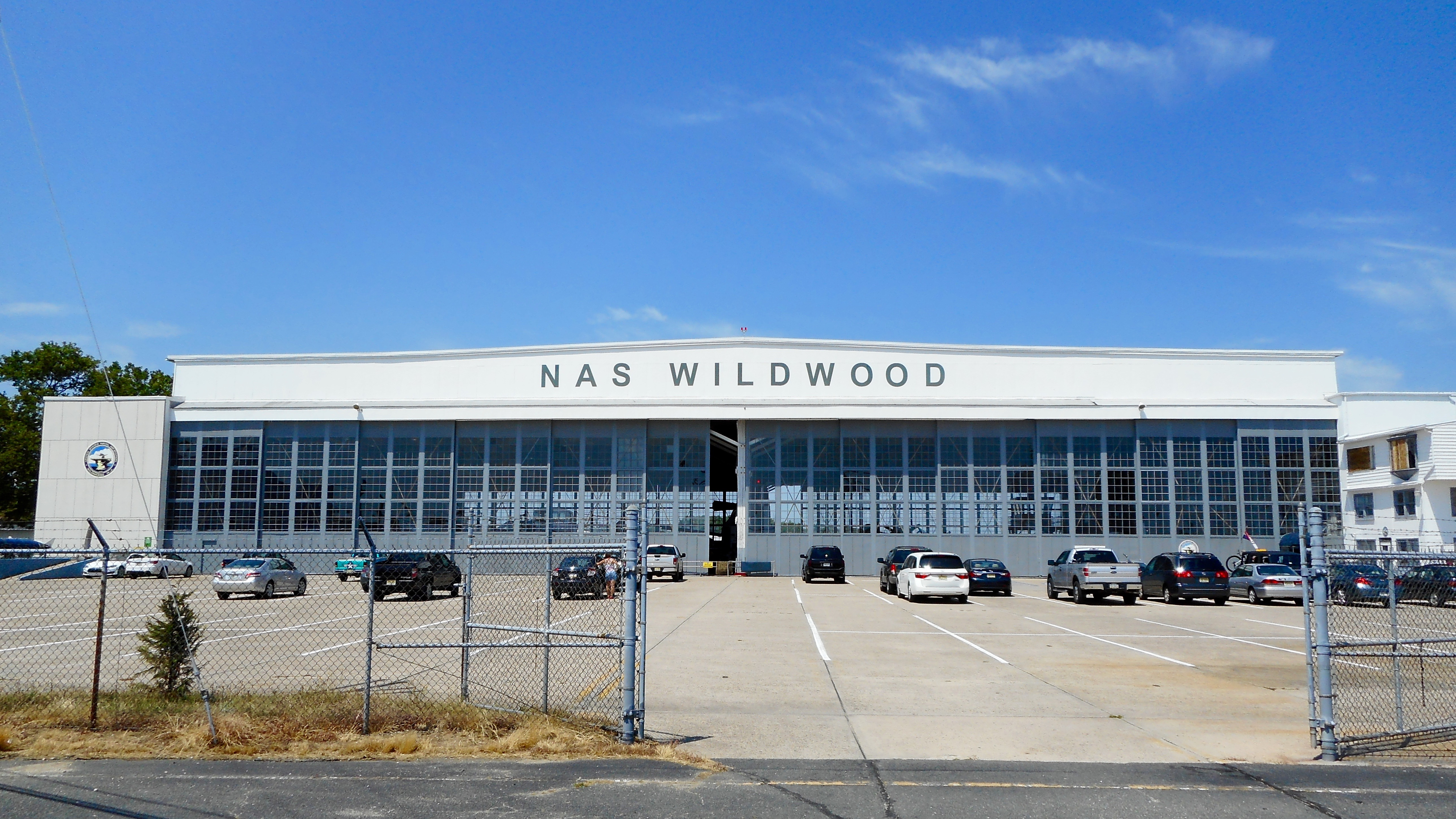
- Hangar #1

- Location in New Jersey
- Established: 1997
- Location: Lower Township, New Jersey
- Coordinates: 39.00507°N 74.90974°W
- Type: Aviation museum
- Collection size: 20+ aircraft
- Founder: Dr. Joseph Salvatore
- Chairperson: Dr. Joseph Salvatore
- Website: usnasw.org

The Naval Air Station Wildwood Aviation Museum is an aviation museum located at the Cape May Airport in Lower Township, in Cape May County, New Jersey, United States.

== History ==
The Cape May Airport, which hosts the museum, was originally constructed by the U.S. Navy from 1941 to 1942. Commissioned in April 1943 as Naval Air Station Rio Grande, the field was so named due to its proximity to the community of Rio Grande, New Jersey. Due to problems with mail, telegram, and telephone service, caused in part by confusion with Rio Grande City, Texas, the Navy opted to rename the airfield as Naval Air Station Wildwood in June 1943.

In the mid-1990s, Dr. Joseph Salvatore purchased Hangar #1, which was then dilapidated.

The museum is located in the airport's Hangar #1, which is typical of the design of many U.S. Navy and U.S. Marine Corps aircraft hangars of the 1940s, many of which are still in use today at both active Naval Air Stations, Marine Corps Air Stations and Coast Guard Air Stations across the United States, as well as other civilian airports that formerly served as air stations. The museum's hangar is currently listed on the National Register of Historic Places.

The museum's aircraft collection focuses on World War II, when the U.S. Navy conducted training operations at the site, but also includes more recent vintage military aircraft from the Cold War, the Korean War, the Vietnam War and the post-Cold War period.

The museum suffered damage from Hurricane Sandy in 2012.

A Humvee that the United States Coast Guard used in Afghanistan was placed on loan to the museum in 2014.

In 2022, an R-2800 WWII aircraft engine recovered from the ocean was donated to the museum. Later that same year, the museum had a new roof installed. The museum temporarily closed in October 2023 to complete the second phase of roof repairs.

== Aircraft on display ==
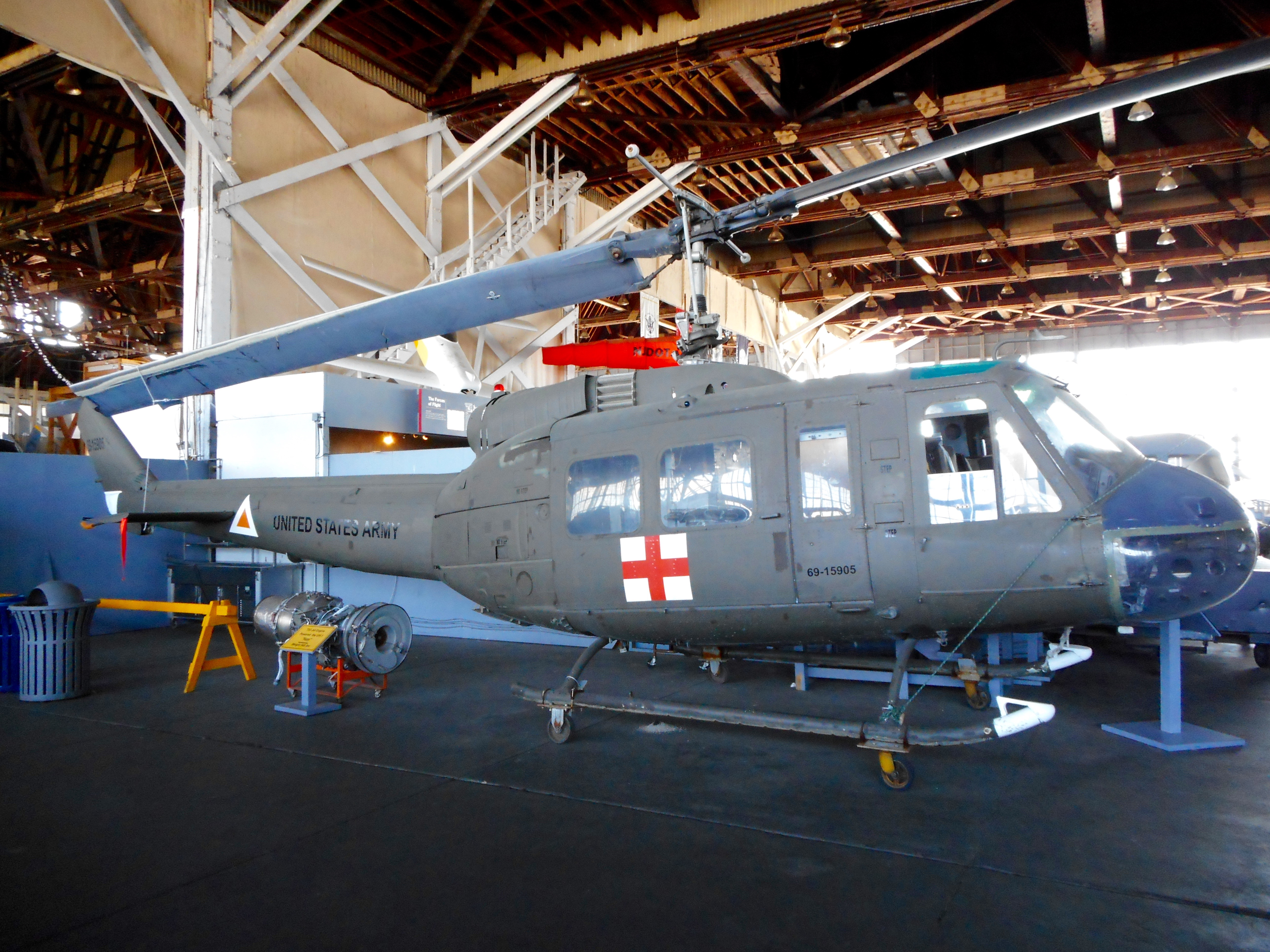
Bell UH-1

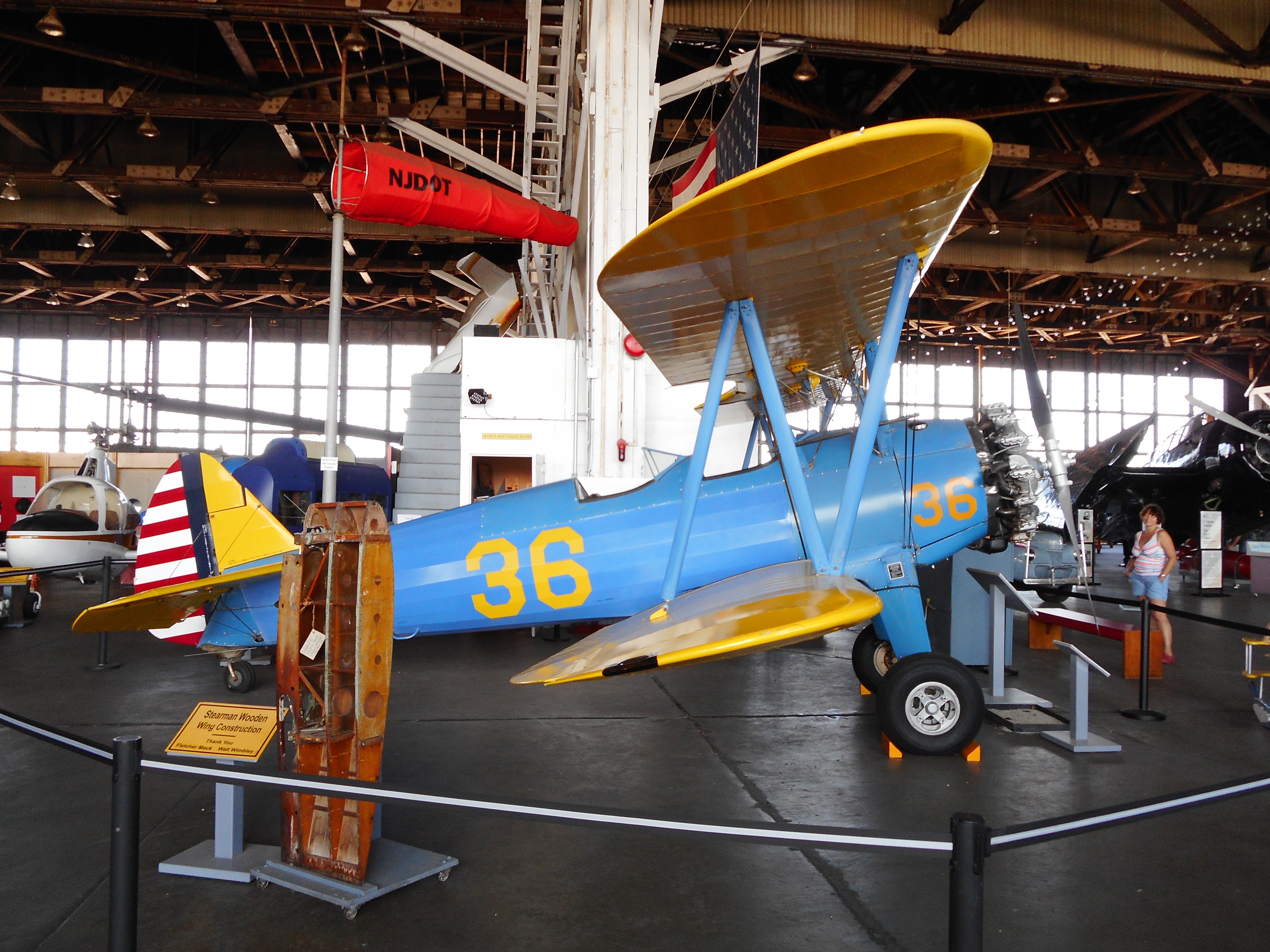
Stearman

The museum's collection includes:

- Air & Space 18A 18-59
- Bell AH-1 Cobra 67-15633
- Bell EH-1X Iroquois 69-15905
- Bell UH-1M Iroquois
- Boeing-Stearman N2S-3 Kaydet 38073
- Boeing-Stearman PT-17 Kaydet 40-1825
- Cessna 150
- Cessna OE-2 Bird Dog 140090
- Douglas A-4A Skyhawk 142180
- General Dynamics F-16B Fighting Falcon 78-0088
- Grumman F-14B Tomcat 161422
- Grumman F6F-3 Hellcat
- Grumman TBM-3E Avenger 86180
- Hughes OH-6 Cayuse 67-16638
- Lockheed T-33A Shooting Star 10055
- Lockheed T-33A Shooting Star 10056
- McCulloch J-2
- Mikoyan-Gurevich MiG-15 1961
- North American T-28C Trojan 140557
- Northrop F-5E Tiger II 741572
- Sikorsky HH-52A Seaguard 1462
- Vultee BT-13 Valiant 42-88708
- V-2 rocket – replica

== Events ==
The museum holds an annual AirFest airshow.

== See also ==
- List of museums in New Jersey
- List of aerospace museums
- List of maritime museums in the United States
