= Avalon Life Saving Station =

- U.S. National Register of Historic Places
- New Jersey Register of Historic Places
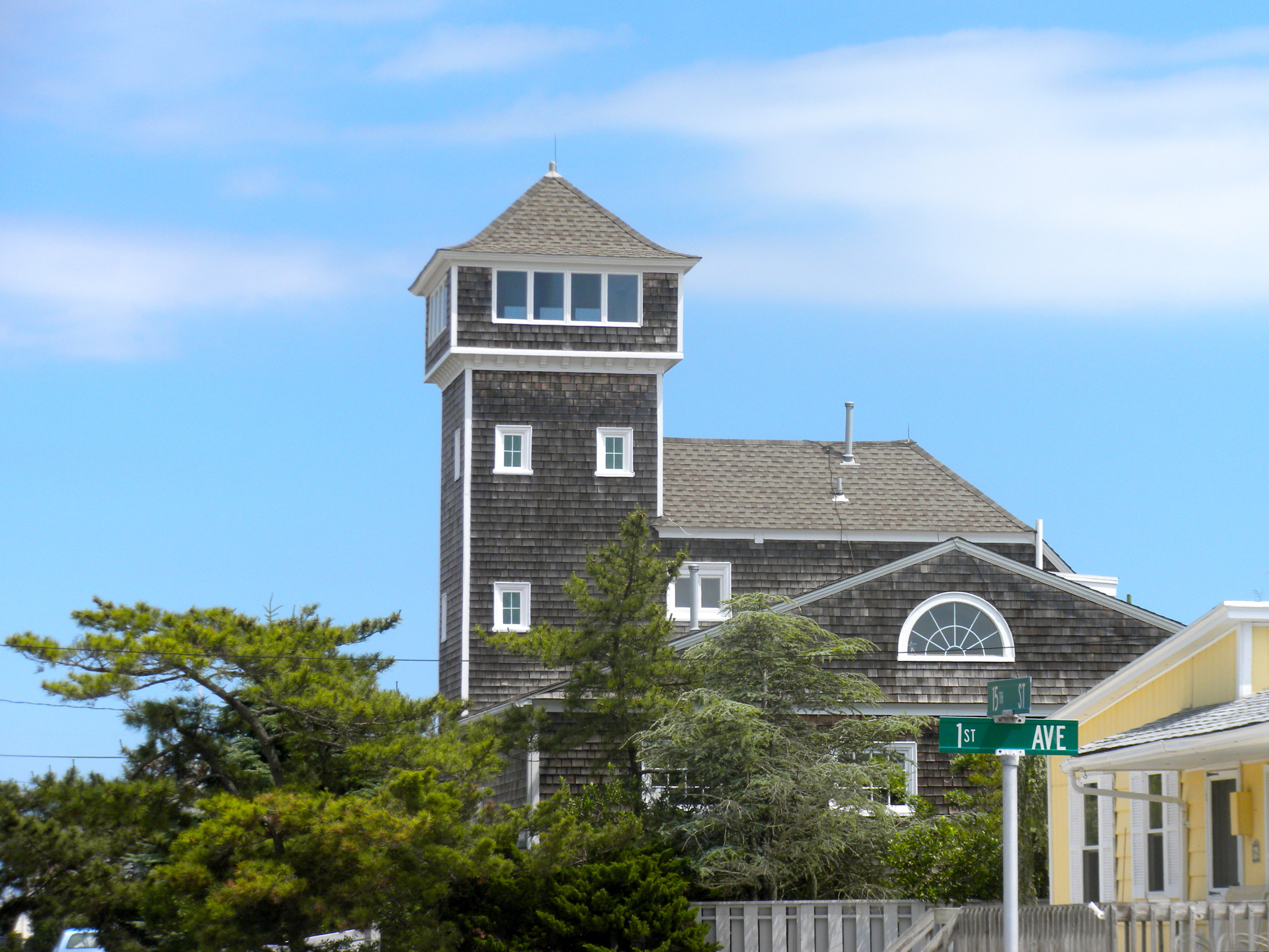
- Avalon Life Saving Station in 2010.

- Location within Cape May County, New Jersey Location within New Jersey Location within the United States
- Location: 76 West 15th Street, Avalon, New Jersey
- Coordinates: 39°6′14″N 74°42′46″W
- Built: 1894
- Built by: Hiram Godfrey
- Architectural style: Shingle Style
- NRHP reference No.: 79001480
- NJRHP No.: 986

Significant dates
- Added to NRHP: March 2, 1979
- Designated NJRHP: December 28, 1978

The Avalon Life Saving Station, also known as the Avalon Coast Guard Station, is located at 76 West 15th Street in the borough of Avalon in Cape May County, New Jersey, United States. The historic coastal maritime station was built in 1894 by Hiram Godfrey, a local contractor. The Shingle Style building was added to the National Register of Historic Places on March 2, 1979, for its significance in architecture, commerce, and transportation. It was documented by the Historic American Buildings Survey (HABS) in 1992.

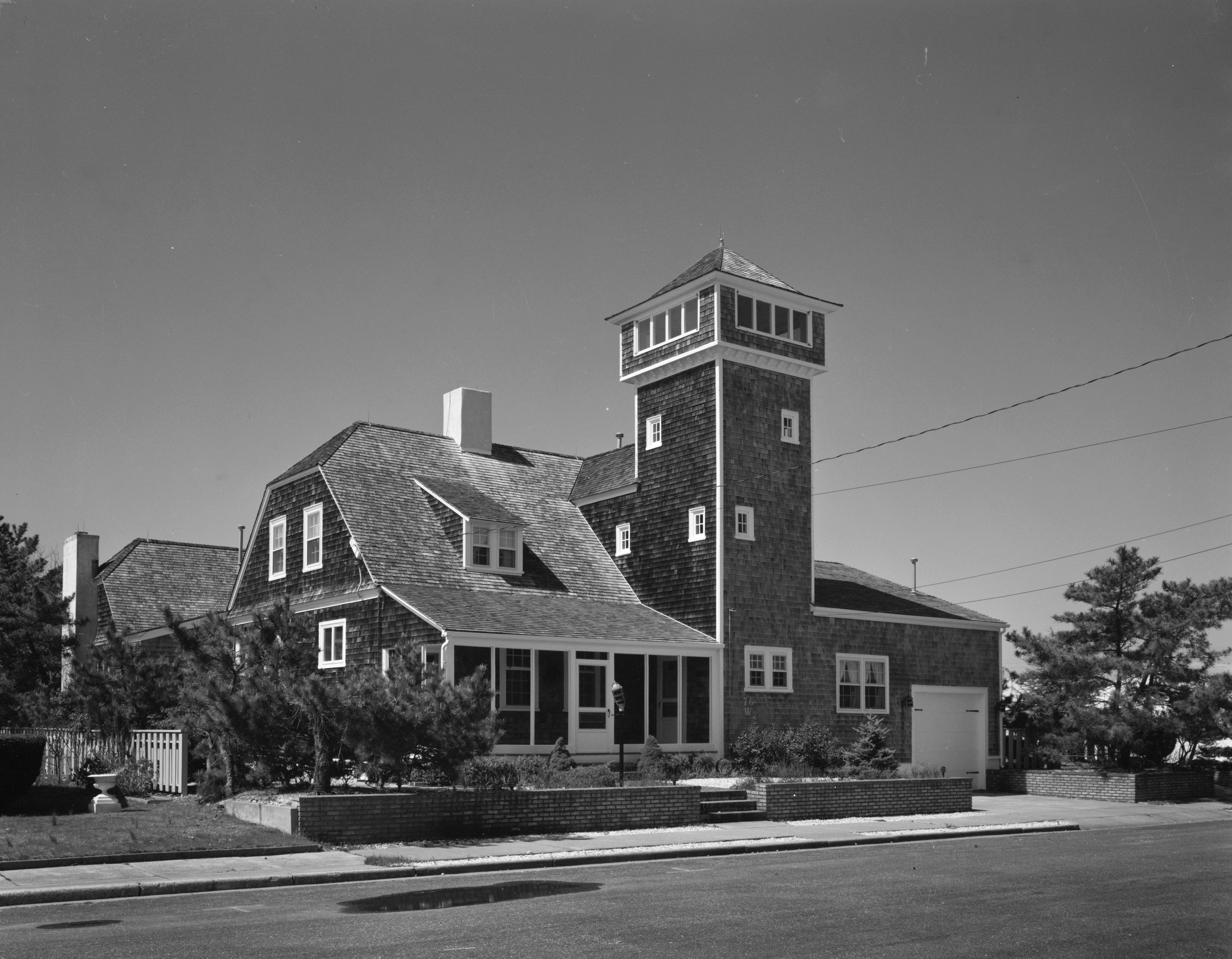
HABS photo from 1992

== See also ==
- National Register of Historic Places listings in Cape May County, New Jersey
