= Fire Control Tower No. 23 =

- U.S. National Register of Historic Places
- New Jersey Register of Historic Places
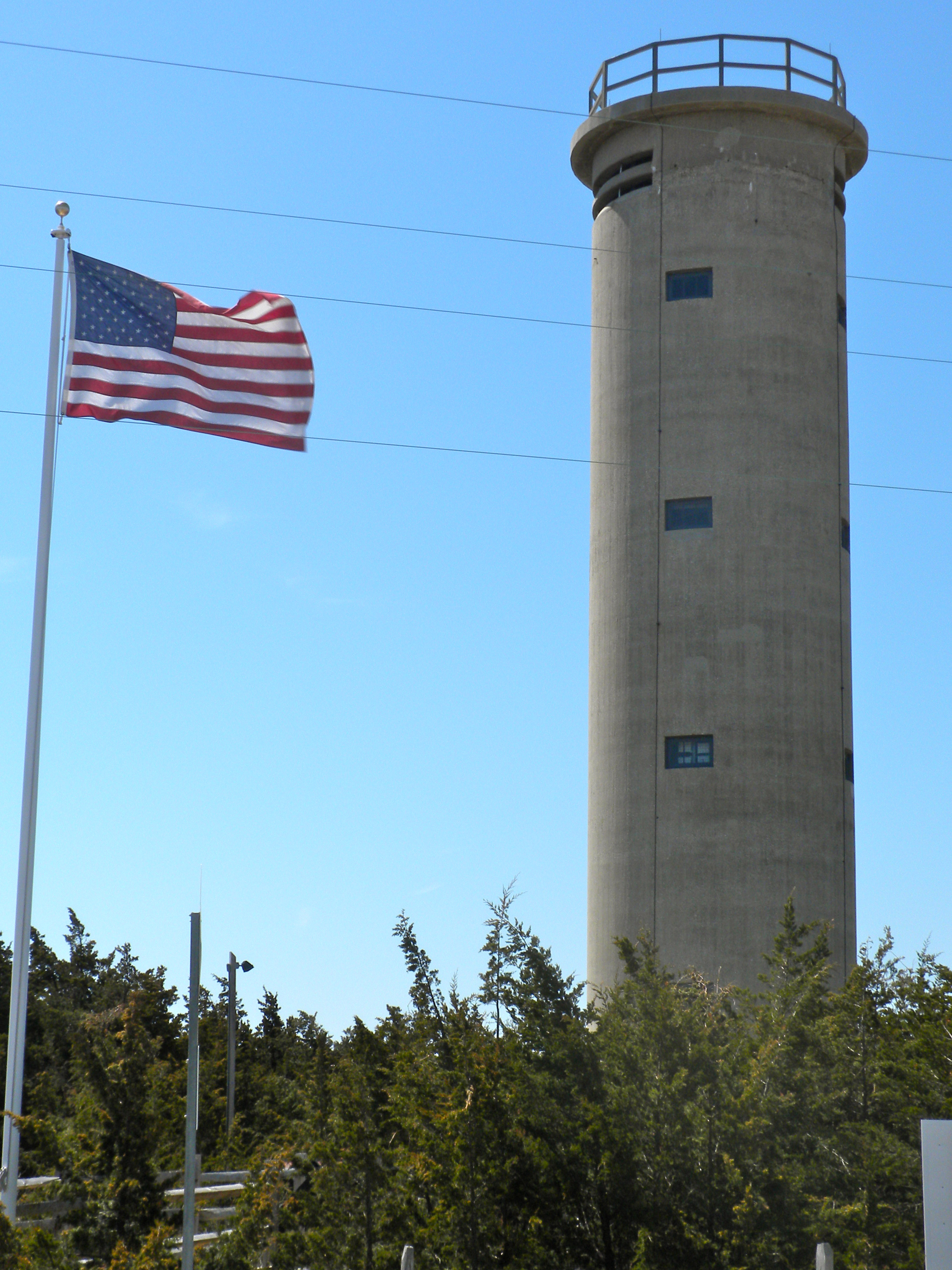

- Location within Cape May County, New Jersey Location within New Jersey Location within the United States
- Location: Sunset Boulevard, Lower Township, New Jersey
- Coordinates: 38°56′36″N 74°58′01″W
- Built: 1942
- Architectural style: Fire Control Tower
- NRHP reference No.: 03000655
- NJRHP No.: 4169

Significant dates
- Added to NRHP: November 17, 2003
- Designated NJRHP: May 29, 2003

Fire Control Tower No. 23 is a NRHP-listed tower located in Lower Township of Cape May County, New Jersey, United States. The tower was built in 1942 as part of Fort Miles, the system of harbor defenses of the Delaware Bay. It was one of 15 towers from North Wildwood, New Jersey to Bethany Beach, Delaware used to aim coastal batteries at German ships. It is located near Sunset Beach in Cape May Point State Park.

The tower was added to the New Jersey Register of Historic Places on May 29, 2003, and to the National Register of Historic Places on November 17, 2003, for its significance in military history. About this time the tower was renovated under the direction of architect Robert Russell. Spiral staircases, lighting and safety features were installed, allowing the public to climb to the top of the tower and a wooden walkway was built to Sunset Avenue.

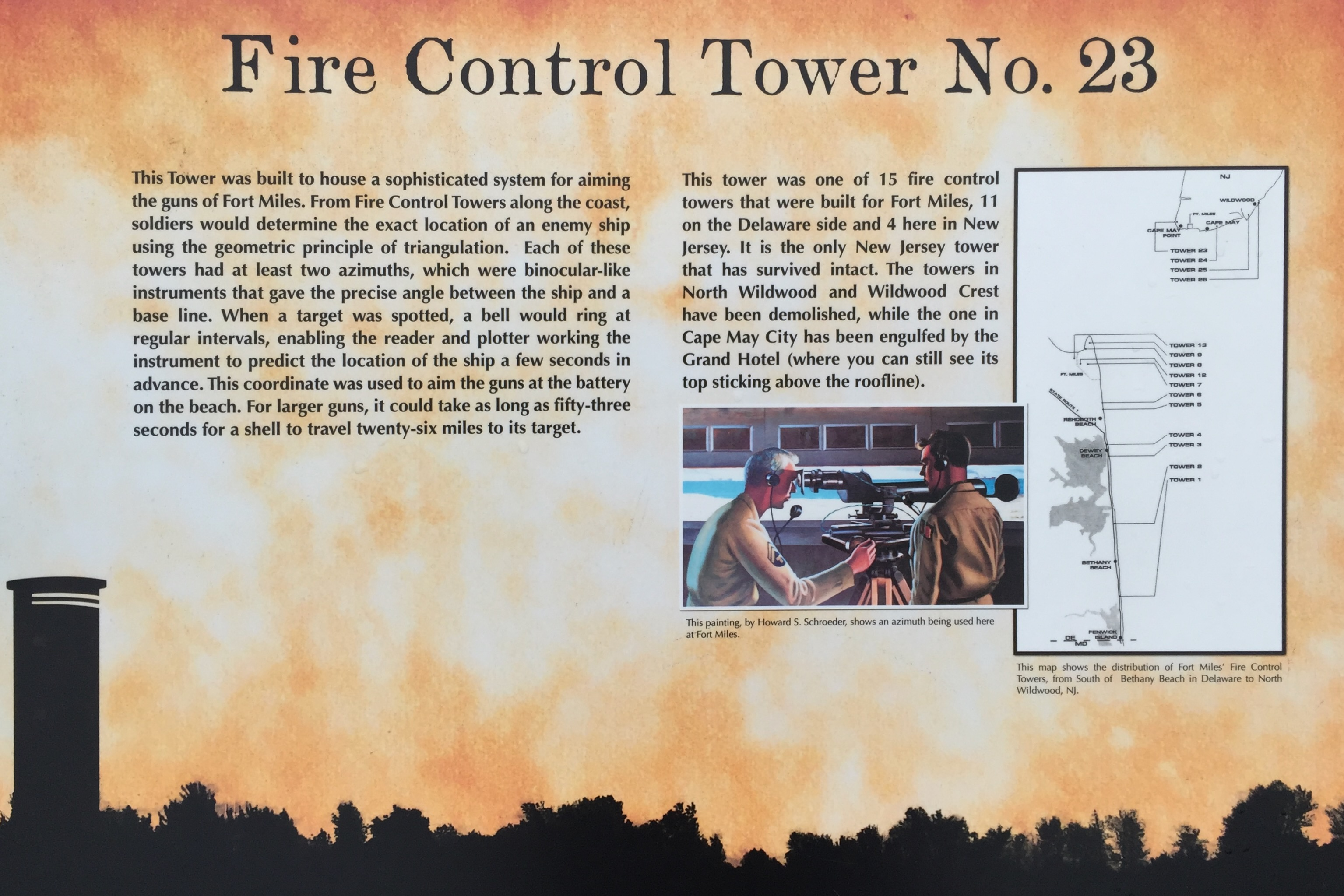
Historical information sign about the fire control tower

== See also ==
- National Register of Historic Places listings in Cape May County, New Jersey
- Battery 223
- Fire Control Tower
