= South Cape May, New Jersey =

Borough in New Jersey, United States

Coordinates: 38.933°N 74.942°W

Historical population
Census	Pop.	Note	%±
1900	14		—
1910	7		−50.0%
1920	10		42.9%
1930	6		−40.0%
source:1910-1930

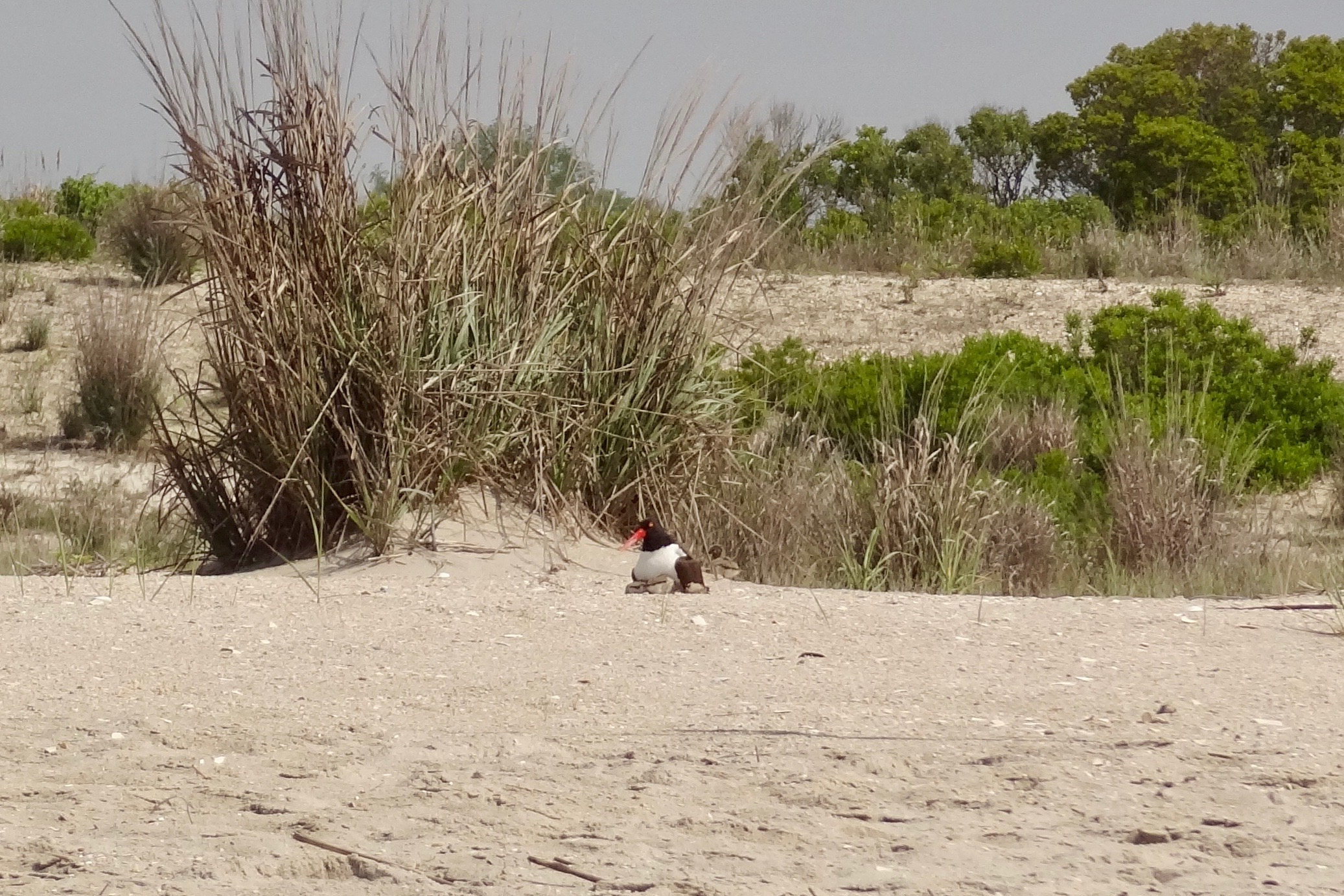
American oystercatcher on the beach at South Cape May Meadows

South Cape May was a borough that existed in Cape May County, in the U.S. state of New Jersey, from 1894 to 1945.

The borough was established on August 27, 1894, from portions of Lower Township, based on the results of a referendum held six days earlier.

The borough was heavily wrecked after the 1936 Nor'easter, and was ultimately destroyed by the 1944 Great Atlantic Hurricane, which hit in September of that year. After the hurricane, the borough was dissolved as of April 30, 1945, and returned to Lower Township.

The remaining land not underwater is part of a bird sanctuary known as the South Cape May Meadows Preserve.

== History ==
After buying 89 acres (36 ha) of land in 1840, Mark Devine continuously bought parcels of land, eventually owning 225 acres (91 ha) of land stretching from Paterson Avenue in Cape May to Cape May Point. In 1882, Theodore M. Reger, an entrepreneur, formed an investment group known as The Cape May City Land Company, where they bought Devine's tract south of Broadway. Reger sought to develop the land, with the goal of land reclamation, seawall construction, wharves, roads, hotels, and cottages.

In 1885, Reger built a Lucy-type elephant called the Light of Asia, which housed his real estate office, concessions, and a sightseeing platform. People called the elephant "Jumbo" because of its size, as well as the fact that Barnum & Bailey Circus had an elephant named Jumbo. Due to low visitation, the structure was demolished in 1900.

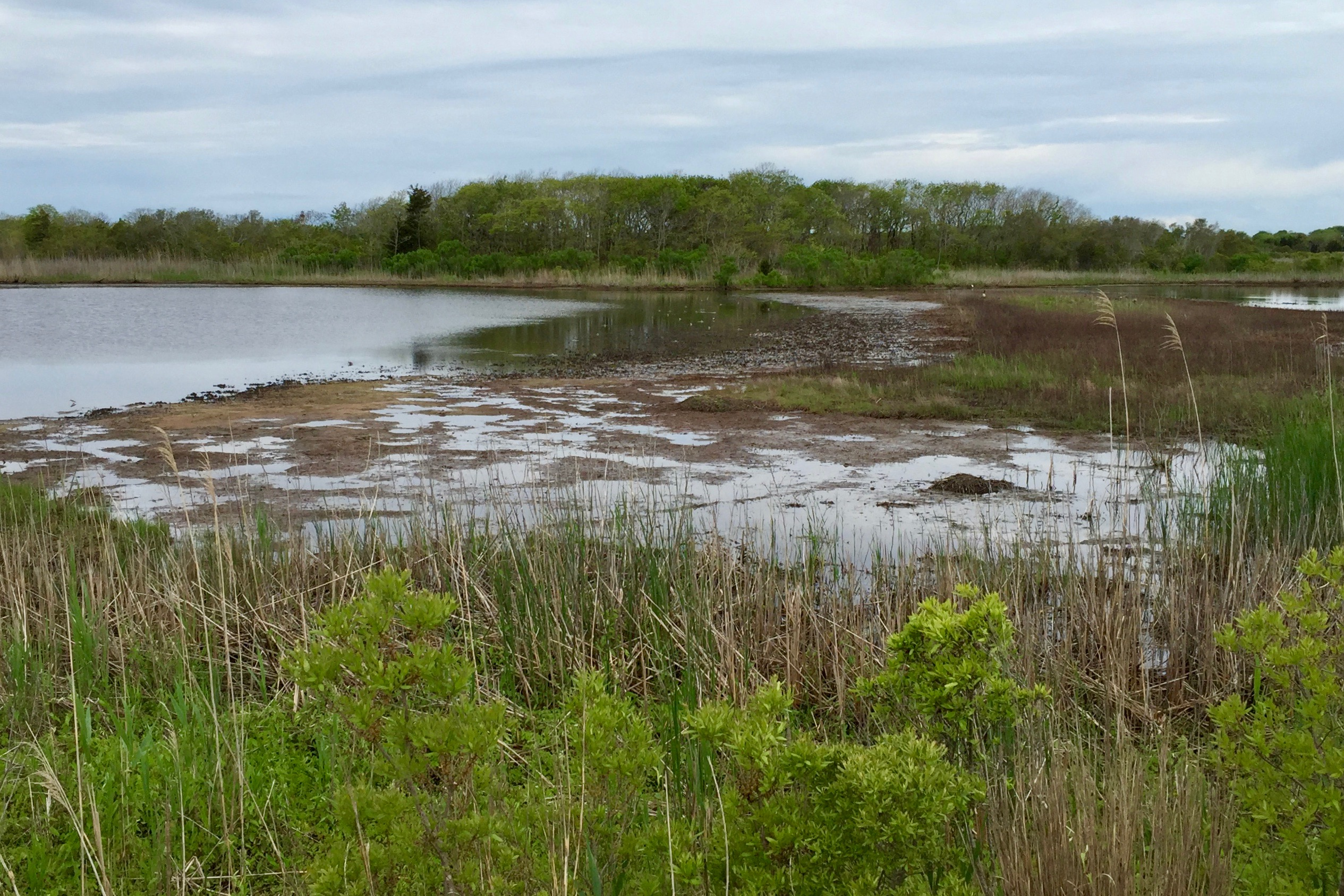
The meadows in 2016

In the 1887, construction began on the New Mount Vernon Hotel to replace the original Mount Vernon Hotel, which burnt down in 1856 during construction, and would have been the largest hotel in the world. The new hotel was to be smaller than the original, but the plan included cottages that stretched 14 beachfront blocks and 69 blocks all the way to the Cape May Turnpike (currently Sunset Boulevard) in a gridiron pattern. In 1887, a mural of the new hotel was painted on the side of the Light of Asia elephant to advertise it. By 1888, South Cape May consisted of one hotel, 8 cottages, bathhouses, and a two-story pavilion.

In 1894, Reger withdrew the tract of land from Lower Township to form the borough of South Cape May. Shortly after, Reger and his business partner, James Henry Edmunds, formed another company, the West Cape May Improvement Company, in order to develop the lots and streets within the borough. Between 1892 and 1918, an electric trolley car ran through South Cape May to connect it to Cape May.

By 1910, the beachfront properties had to be moved inland by a block so they would face the railroad tracks on Mount Vernon Avenue, rather than the ocean. A three-story boarding house opened around this time, but most of the land remained a meadow.

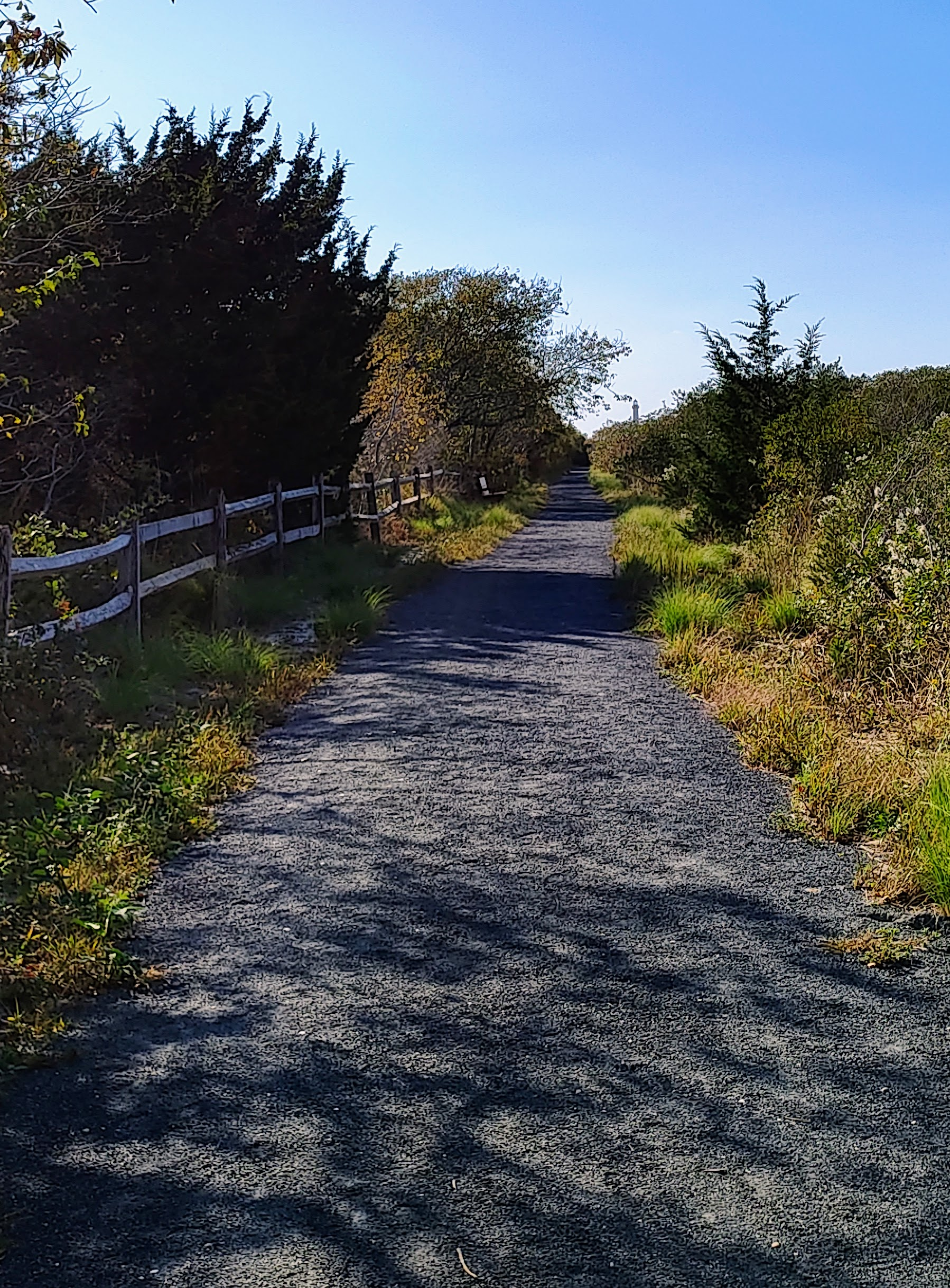
A path between the Meadows and Cape May Point State Park, with the Cape May Lighthouse in the distance

In 1925, Sunset Boulevard was paved over the gravel Cape May Turnpike due to talks about a ferry forming between Cape May Point and Delaware. This led to an influx of development in the area, although the ferry wasn't built until 20 years later in North Cape May. That same year, several Spanish-villa style cottages were built in South Cape May. There were roughly 50 in the borough, although this only consisted of 5% of the land in the borough.

In 1936, a Nor'easter destroyed many of the cottages in the borough, including the mayor's home, which led to efforts by the borough to implement measures to protect the shoreline. The 1944 Great Atlantic hurricane dealt the final blow to the borough. Floodwater went all the way past Sunset Boulevard, leaving any structures either destroyed or uninhabitable. The borough then declared bankruptcy as they had no properties to tax, with the borough being returned back to Lower Township. Later, in 1950, a fierce tidal wave swept through the area, reaching as far as 6th Avenue in West Cape May, ultimately destroying any remaining structures in the former South Cape May, returning the area into the meadow it was prior to development.

Today, the remaining land is now home to a bird sanctuary known as South Cape Meadows, which is adjacent to Cape May Point State Park.
