= Coachman (disambiguation) =

A coachman is a person who drives a coach or carriage, or similar horse-drawn vehicle

Coachman or Coachmen may also refer to:

- Coachman (surname)
- The Coachman, character in Carlo Collodi's 1883 book The Adventures of Pinocchio
- The Coachman (film), Korean film
- The Coachmen, band
- Coachman, synonym for the pennant coralfish (Heniochus Monoceros)
- Royal Coachman, artificial fly for fly fishing
