= Coachman (surname) =

Coachman is a surname. Notable people with the name include:

- Alice Coachman
- Jonathan Coachman
- Owen Coachman, of the Owen Coachman House
- Pete Coachman
