= Jonathan Pyne House =

Historic house in New Jersey, United States

- U.S. National Register of Historic Places
- New Jersey Register of Historic Places
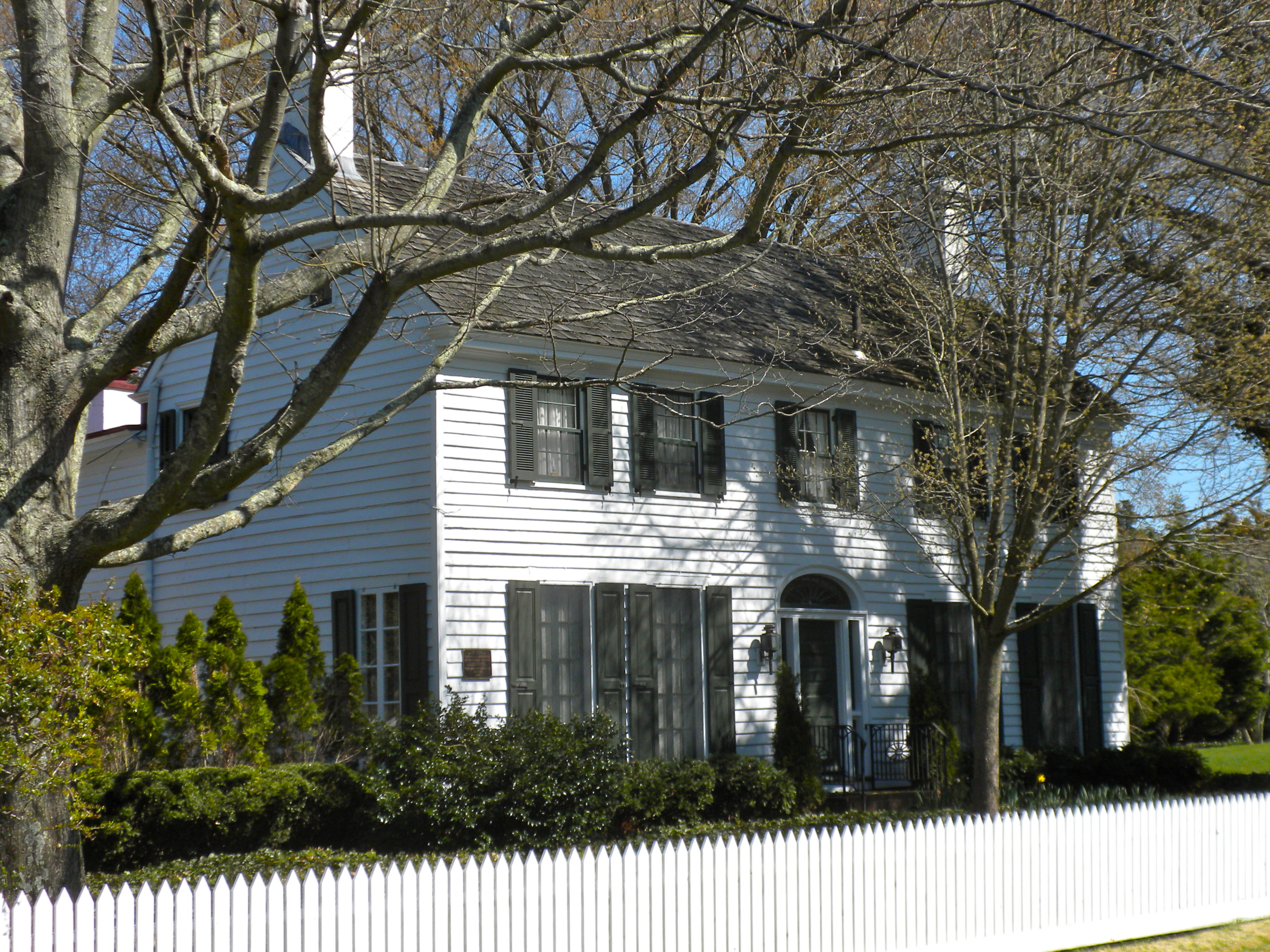

- Location within Cape May County, New Jersey Location within New Jersey Location within the United States
- Nearest city: Lower Township, New Jersey
- Coordinates: 38°56′18″N 74°57′35″W
- Area: 2.3 acres (0.93 ha)
- Built: 1694
- Architectural style: Colonial, Federal
- NRHP reference No.: 97000061
- NJRHP No.: 3050

Significant dates
- Added to NRHP: February 14, 1997
- Designated NJRHP: December 30, 1996

The Jonathan Pyne House, formerly the Richard Stites Jr. House, is located in Lower Township, Cape May County, New Jersey, United States. The house was built in 1694 and added to the National Register of Historic Places on February 14, 1997.

== See also ==
- National Register of Historic Places listings in Cape May County, New Jersey
- List of the oldest buildings in New Jersey
