= Lower Township, New Jersey =

Township in Cape May County, New Jersey, US

- Township
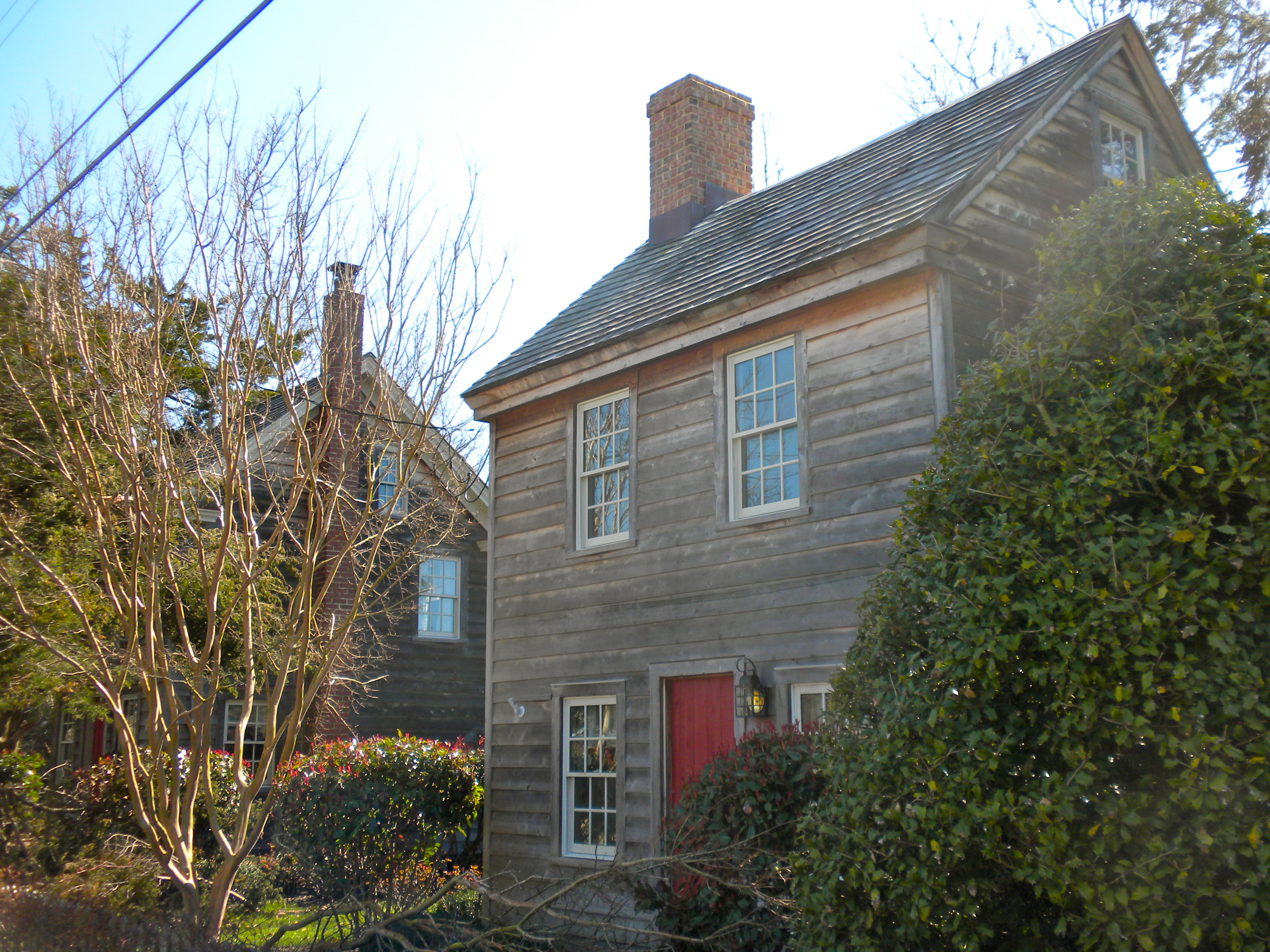
- Owen Coachman House

- Seal
- Motto: "Home of the Best Sunsets"
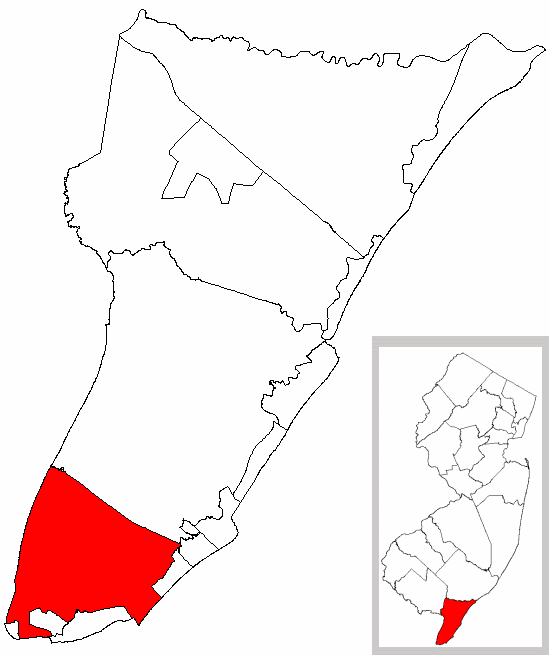
- Location of Lower Township in Cape May County highlighted in red (left). Inset map: Location of Cape May County in New Jersey highlighted in red (right).

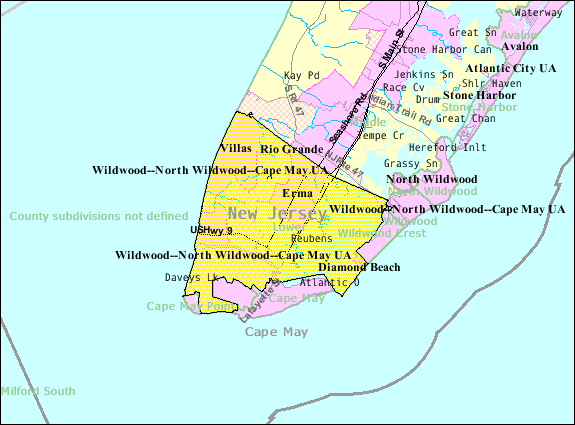
- Census Bureau map of Lower Township, New Jersey

- Location in Cape May County Location in New Jersey Location in the United States
- Coordinates: 38.983768°N 74.911308°W
- Country: United States
- State: New Jersey
- County: Cape May
- Established: April 2, 1723 (as precinct)
- Incorporated: February 21, 1798 (as township)

Government
  - Type: Faulkner Act (council–manager)
  - Body: Township Council
  - Mayor: Frank Sippel (R, term ends December 31, 2023)
  - Manager: Michael Laffey
  - Municipal clerk: Julie Picard

Area
  - Total: 31.06 sq mi (80.45 km^{2})
  - Land: 27.38 sq mi (70.91 km^{2})
  - Water: 3.68 sq mi (9.54 km^{2}) 11.86%
  - Rank: 84th of 565 in state 4th of 16 in county
- Elevation: 20 ft (6.1 m)

Population (2020)
  - Total: 22,057
  - Estimate (2023): 21,886
  - Rank: 127th of 565 in state 1st of 16 in county
  - Density: 805.6/sq mi (311.0/km^{2})
  - Rank: 407th of 565 in state 10th of 16 in county
- Time zone: UTC−05:00 (Eastern (EST))
  - Summer (DST): UTC−04:00 (Eastern (EDT))
- ZIP Code: 08251 – Villas
- Area code: 609 exchanges: 884, 886, 889, 898
- FIPS code: 3400941610
- GNIS feature ID: 0882044
- Website: www.townshipoflower.org

Lower Township is a township in Cape May County, in the U.S. state of New Jersey. The township, and all of Cape May County, is part of the Ocean City metropolitan statistical area, and is part of the Philadelphia metropolitan area. As of the 2020 United States census, the township's population was 22,057, a decrease of 809 (−3.5%) from the 2010 census count of 22,866, which in turn reflected a decrease of 79 (−0.3%) from the 22,945 counted in the 2000 census.

New Jersey Monthly magazine ranked Lower Township as its 34th best place to live in its 2008 rankings of the "Best Places To Live" in New Jersey. The township is part of the state's South Jersey region and the larger Philadelphia metropolitan area.

== History ==
Before European settlement, the Kechemeche, a tribe of the Lenape Native Americans, inhabited South Jersey and traveled to the barrier islands during the summer to hunt and fish. On August 28, 1609, English explorer Henry Hudson entered the Delaware Bay and spent one day ashore, north of what is now Cape May Point. In 1630, representatives of the Dutch West India Company purchased a 16 mi^{2} (41 km^{2}) tract of land along the Delaware from indigenous people, with additional land in the county acquired 11 years later. Due to the large population of whales off of the Cape May coast, Dutch explorers founded Town Bank around 1640 as a whaling village in what is now Lower Township. It was the first European settlement in Cape May County. The village later served as the county court house, along with Coxehall, built by Dr. Daniel Coxe as the center of a manorial style of government. The only surviving section of the original structure, which was moved several times during its history, is now preserved as Coxe Hall Cottage at Historic Cold Spring Village, a 19th-century living history museum in Lower Township.

Lower Township was formed as a precinct on April 2, 1723, and was incorporated by an act of the New Jersey Legislature on February 21, 1798, as one of New Jersey's initial group of 104 townships established by the Township Act of 1798. The township derives its name from its geographic position when Cape May was split into three townships in 1723 at the same time that Middle Township and Upper Township were established.

Portions of Lower Township were later separated to form Cape Island Borough (March 8, 1848; now known as Cape May city), Cape May Point borough (created April 19, 1878; restored to Lower Township on April 8, 1896; re-created April 6, 1908), Holly Beach (April 14, 1885, now part of Wildwood city), South Cape May (August 27, 1894; restored to Lower Township after the borough was dissolved on April 30, 1945), Wildwood Crest (April 6, 1910), and North Cape May (March 19, 1928; restored to Lower Township after it was dissolved on April 30, 1945).

== Geography ==
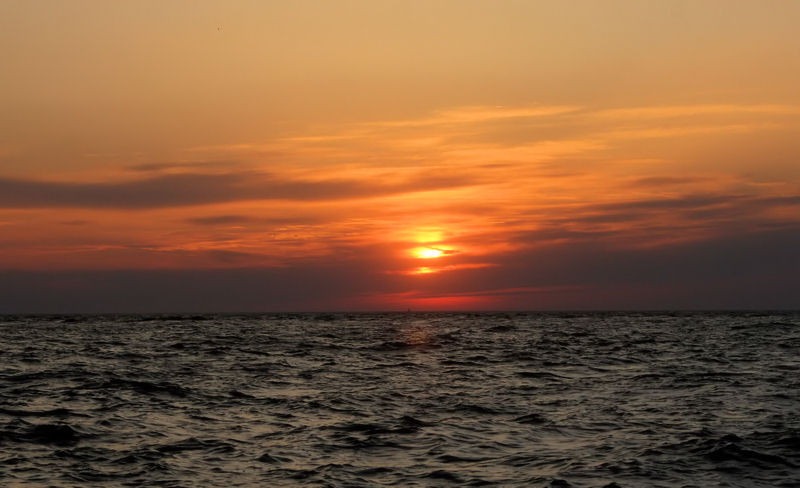
Sunset at Sunset Beach in Lower Township

According to the U.S. Census Bureau, the township had a total area of 31.06 square miles (80.45 km^{2}), including 27.38 square miles (70.91 km^{2}) of land and 3.69 square miles (9.54 km^{2}) of water (11.86%).

Census-designated places (CDPs) located within Lower Township include Diamond Beach (with a 2020 population of 203), Erma (2,031), North Cape May (4,007), Rio Grande (3,610), and Villas (9,134). Other unincorporated communities, localities and place names located partially or completely within the township include Bennett, Cold Spring, Cold Spring Inlet, Ephraims Island, Fishing Creek, Higbees Landing, Miami Beach, Schellengers Landing, Sewells Point, Shawcrest, South Cape May, Sunset Beach, Town Bank, Weers Landing, and Wildwood Gables.

Schellengers Landing is where boats dock and where a bridge between Cape Island and the mainland is located. Schellengers Landing was named after people who moved from New England to New Jersey in the 1600s. There were multiple families with the Schellenger name who had settled the area. Schellengers Landing is connected to Cape May city via a bridge, and is on Route 109. The name of the community is spelled differently in different works.

Lower Township borders the Cape May County municipalities of Cape May City, Cape May Point Borough, Middle Township, West Cape May Borough, Wildwood City, Wildwood Crest Borough, and Delaware Bay and the Atlantic Ocean.

== Demographics ==
Historical population
| Census | Pop. | Note | %± |
|---|---|---|---|
| 1810 | 862 | | — |
| 1820 | 1,001 | | 16.1% |
| 1830 | 999 | | −0.2% |
| 1840 | 1,133 | | 13.4% |
| 1850 | 1,604 | * | 41.6% |
| 1860 | 1,865 | | 16.3% |
| 1870 | 1,783 | | −4.4% |
| 1880 | 1,779 | * | −0.2% |
| 1890 | 1,156 | * | −35.0% |
| 1900 | 1,141 | * | −1.3% |
| 1910 | 1,188 | * | 4.1% |
| 1920 | 1,096 | | −7.7% |
| 1930 | 1,444 | * | 31.8% |
| 1940 | 1,693 | | 17.2% |
| 1950 | 2,737 | | 61.7% |
| 1960 | 6,332 | | 131.3% |
| 1970 | 10,154 | | 60.4% |
| 1980 | 17,105 | | 68.5% |
| 1990 | 20,820 | | 21.7% |
| 2000 | 22,945 | | 10.2% |
| 2010 | 22,866 | | −0.3% |
| 2020 | 22,057 | | −3.5% |
| 2023 (est.) | 21,886 | | −0.8% |
Population sources: 1810–2000; 1810–1920 1840 1850–1870; 1850 1870 1880–1890; 1890–1910 1910–1930; 1940–2000 2000; 2010 2020 * = Lost territory in previous decade

2020 Census

The 2020 United States census counted a population of 22,057 residents and 10,862 households in the township.

=== 2010 census ===
The 2010 United States census counted 22,866 people, 9,579 households, and 6,351 families in the township. The population density was 824.3 per square mile (318.3/km^{2}). There were 14,507 housing units at an average density of 523.0 per square mile (201.9/km^{2}). The racial makeup was 94.24% (21,549) White, 1.99% (456) Black or African American, 0.16% (37) Native American, 0.62% (142) Asian, 0.04% (10) Pacific Islander, 1.20% (275) from other races, and 1.74% (397) from two or more races. Hispanic or Latino of any race were 4.24% (969) of the population.

Of the 9,579 households, 22.6% had children under the age of 18; 49.3% were married couples living together; 12.1% had a female householder with no husband present and 33.7% were non-families. Of all households, 28.7% were made up of individuals and 15.1% had someone living alone who was 65 years of age or older. The average household size was 2.38 and the average family size was 2.89.

19.8% of the population were under the age of 18, 7.6% from 18 to 24, 20.4% from 25 to 44, 31.0% from 45 to 64, and 21.1% who were 65 years of age or older. The median age was 46.5 years. For every 100 females, the population had 90.1 males. For every 100 females ages 18 and older there were 86.9 males.

The Census Bureau's 2006–2010 American Community Survey showed that (in 2010 inflation-adjusted dollars) median household income was $51,101 (with a margin of error of +/− $2,460) and the median family income was $62,587 (+/− $7,438). Males had a median income of $50,572 (+/− $3,361) versus $35,978 (+/− $2,297) for females. The per capita income for the borough was $28,175 (+/− $1,295). About 6.6% of families and 10.6% of the population were below the poverty line, including 20.4% of those under age 18 and 6.5% of those age 65 or over.

=== 2000 census ===
As of the 2000 U.S. census, there were 22,945 people, 9,328 households, and 6,380 families residing in the township. The population density was 813.0 inhabitants per square mile (313.9/km^{2}). There were 13,924 housing units at an average density of 493.4 per square mile (190.5/km^{2}). The racial makeup of the township was 96.26% White, 1.39% African American, 0.23% Native American, 0.53% Asian, 0.02% Pacific Islander, 0.65% from other races, and 0.92% from two or more races. Hispanic or Latino of any race were 1.88% of the population.

There were 9,328 households, out of which 28.2% had children under the age of 18 living with them, 52.9% were married couples living together, 11.7% had a female householder with no husband present, and 31.6% were non-families. 27.2% of all households were made up of individuals, and 15.0% had someone living alone who was 65 years of age or older. The average household size was 2.43 and the average family size was 2.95.

In the township, the population was spread out, with 23.7% under the age of 18, 6.1% from 18 to 24, 25.1% from 25 to 44, 24.4% from 45 to 64, and 20.7% who were 65 years of age or older. The median age was 42 years. For every 100 females, there were 90.3 males. For every 100 females age 18 and over, there were 85.2 males.

The median income for a household in the township was $38,977, and the median income for a family was $45,058. Males had a median income of $35,201 versus $24,715 for females. The per capita income for the township was $19,786. About 5.3% of families and 7.7% of the population were below the poverty line, including 10.3% of those under age 18 and 5.3% of those age 65 or over.

== Government ==
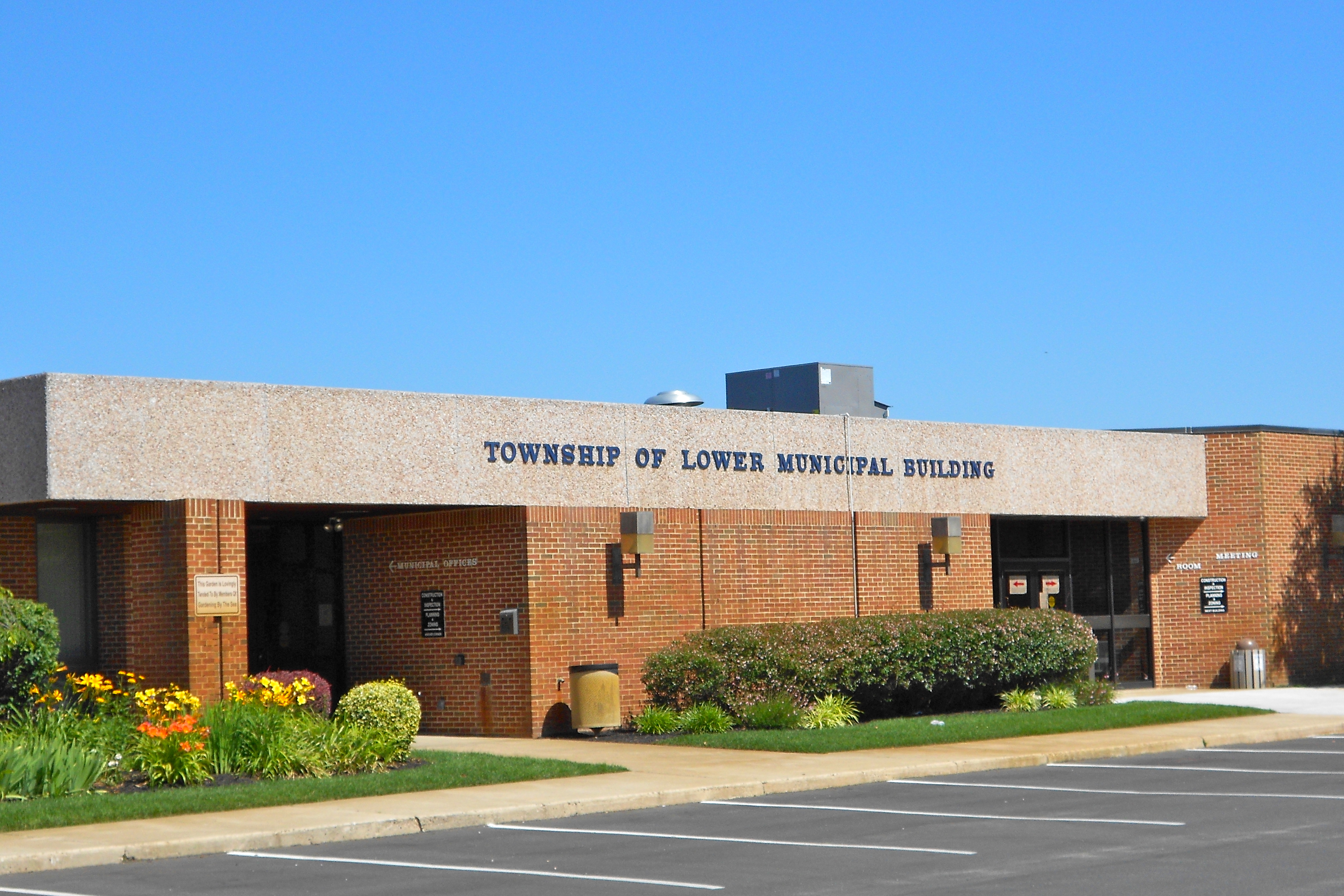
Lower Township's municipal building in Villas

=== Local government ===
Lower Township operates within the Faulkner Act, formally known as the Optional Municipal Charter Law, under the Council-Manager form of government, which was adopted in 1984. The township is one of 42 municipalities (of the 564) statewide that use this form of government. The council is comprised of five members—the Mayor, the Council Member-at-Large and three Ward seats—each elected on a partisan basis to four-year terms on a staggered basis, with either two seats (mayor and council at-large) or the three ward seats up for election in even-numbered years on an alternating basis as part of the November general election. The Mayor presides at all Council meetings and has a voice and vote in the proceedings. Powers are limited to those expressly conferred by the Charter. The Manager serves the council for an indefinite term of office and may be removed by a majority vote of the council. The Manager is the chief executive and administrator of the Township.

As of 2023, members of the Lower Township Council are Mayor Frank Sippel (R, term ends December 31, 2024; At Large), Deputy Mayor David Perry (R, 2024; At Large), Thomas Conrad (R, 2026; Ward I), Kevin Coombs (R, 2026; Ward II) and Roland A. Roy Jr. (R, 2026; Ward III).

Erik Simonsen won a special election in November 2013 to fill the seat of Glenn Douglass, who had resigned two months earlier and whose seat had been filled on an interim basis by Jackie Henderson.

In January 2017, Roland Roy was selected from three candidates nominated by the Republican municipal committee to fill the Third Ward seat vacated by Erik Simonsen when he took office as mayor; Roy served on an interim basis until the November 2017 general election, when he was elected to serve the balance of the term through December 2018.

In February 2020, the Township Council selected Keven Coombs to fill the Ward II seat expiring in December 2022 that became vacant when David Perry was chosen to serve as deputy mayor. Earlier that month, Perry had been shifted to deputy mayor after Frank Sippel was selected as mayor to replace Erik K. Simonsen, who resigned to take office in the New Jersey General Assembly.

=== Federal, state, and county representation ===
Lower Township is located in the 2nd Congressional District and is part of New Jersey's 1st state legislative district.

For the 119th United States Congress, New Jersey's 2nd congressional district is represented by Jeff Van Drew (R, Dennis Township). New Jersey is represented in the United States Senate by Democrats Cory Booker (Newark, term ends 2027) and Andy Kim (Moorestown, term ends 2031).

For the 2026–2027 session, the 1st legislative district of the New Jersey Legislature is represented in the State Senate by Mike Testa (R, Vineland) and in the General Assembly by Antwan McClellan (R, Ocean City) and Erik K. Simonsen (R, Lower Township).

Cape May County is governed by a five-person Board of County Commissioners whose members are elected at-large on a partisan basis to three-year terms of office on a staggered basis, with either one or two seats coming up for election each year; At an annual reorganization held each January, the commissioners select one member to serve as director and another to serve as vice-director. As of 2026, Cape May County's Commissioners are Director Leonard C. Desiderio (R, Sea Isle City, term as commissioner ends December 31, 2027; term as director ends 2026), Vice-Director Andrew Bulakowski (R, Lower Township; term as commissioner ends 2028; term as vice-director ends 2026). Robert Barr (R, Ocean City; 2028) and Will Morey (R, Wildwood Crest; 2026), with one seat expiring in December 2026 vacant after Melanie Collette resigned from office in March 2026. The county's constitutional officers are Clerk Rita Marie Rothberg (R, Ocean City; 2030), Sheriff Robert Nolan (R, Lower Township; 2026) and Surrogate E. Marie Hayes (R, Ocean City; 2028).

=== Politics ===
As of March 2011, there were a total of 14,612 registered voters in Lower Township, of which 3,000 (20.5%) were registered as Democrats, 5,902 (40.4%) were registered as Republicans and 5,702 (39.0%) were registered as Unaffiliated. There were 8 voters registered as Libertarians or Greens.

Gubernatorial election results for Lower Township
| Year | Republican | | Democratic | | Third party(ies) | |
| Year | No. | % | No. | % | No. | % |
|---|---|---|---|---|---|---|
| 2025 | 5,631 | 57.88% | 4,040 | 41.53% | 58 | 0.60% |
| 2021 | 5,333 | 63.16% | 3,070 | 36.36% | 40 | 0.47% |
| 2017 | 3,427 | 51.78% | 3,047 | 46.03% | 145 | 2.19% |
| 2013 | 4,909 | 70.77% | 1,913 | 27.58% | 115 | 1.66% |
| 2009 | 3,712 | 52.05% | 2,882 | 40.42% | 537 | 7.53% |
| 2005 | 2,968 | 45.25% | 3,330 | 50.77% | 261 | 3.98% |

In the 2012 presidential election, Republican Mitt Romney received 52.6% of the vote (5,493 cast), ahead of Democrat Barack Obama with 46.2% (4,823 votes), and other candidates with 1.1% (120 votes), among the 10,534 ballots cast by the township's 15,217 registered voters (98 ballots were spoiled), for a turnout of 69.2%. In the 2008 presidential election, Republican John McCain received 52.2% of the vote (5,831 cast), ahead of Democrat Barack Obama, who received 45.1% (5,040 votes), with 11,177 ballots cast among the township's 14,435 registered voters, for a turnout of 77.4%. In the 2004 presidential election, Republican George W. Bush received 54.3% of the vote (5,951 ballots cast), outpolling Democrat John Kerry, who received around 44.1% (4,830 votes), with 10,961 ballots cast among the township's 14,709 registered voters, for a turnout percentage of 74.5.

Presidential elections results
| Year | Republican | Democratic |
|---|---|---|
| 2024 | 59.8% 7,373 | 38.6% 4,752 |
| 2020 | 59.1% 7,749 | 39.3% 5,160 |
| 2016 | 59.6% 5,307 | 36.3% 3,840 |
| 2012 | 52.6% 5,493 | 46.2% 4,823 |
| 2008 | 52.2% 5,831 | 45.1% 5,040 |
| 2004 | 54.3% 5,951 | 44.1% 4,830 |

In the 2013 gubernatorial election, Republican Chris Christie received 70.8% of the vote (4,909 cast), ahead of Democrat Barbara Buono with 27.6% (1,913 votes), and other candidates with 1.7% (115 votes), among the 7,142 ballots cast by the township's 14,910 registered voters (205 ballots were spoiled), for a turnout of 47.9%. In the 2009 gubernatorial election, Republican Chris Christie received 51.6% of the vote (3,712 ballots cast), ahead of both Democrat Jon Corzine with 40.1% (2,882 votes) and Independent Chris Daggett with 6.0% (433 votes), with 7,190 ballots cast among the township's 14,989 registered voters, yielding a 48.0% turnout.

United States Senate election results for Lower Township1
| Year | Republican | | Democratic | | Third party(ies) | |
| Year | No. | % | No. | % | No. | % |
|---|---|---|---|---|---|---|
| 2024 | 7,070 | 60.85% | 4,396 | 37.84% | 152 | 1.31% |
| 2018 | 5,391 | 61.10% | 3,138 | 35.57% | 294 | 3.33% |
| 2012 | 4,563 | 48.85% | 4,569 | 48.92% | 208 | 2.23% |
| 2006 | 3,828 | 54.38% | 3,036 | 43.13% | 176 | 2.50% |

United States Senate election results for Lower Township2
| Year | Republican | | Democratic | | Third party(ies) | |
| Year | No. | % | No. | % | No. | % |
|---|---|---|---|---|---|---|
| 2020 | 7,203 | 57.77% | 5,009 | 40.17% | 256 | 2.05% |
| 2014 | 3,527 | 55.54% | 2,692 | 42.39% | 131 | 2.06% |
| 2013 | 2,007 | 57.46% | 1,430 | 40.94% | 56 | 1.60% |
| 2008 | 4,846 | 49.70% | 4,655 | 47.74% | 249 | 2.55% |

== Education ==
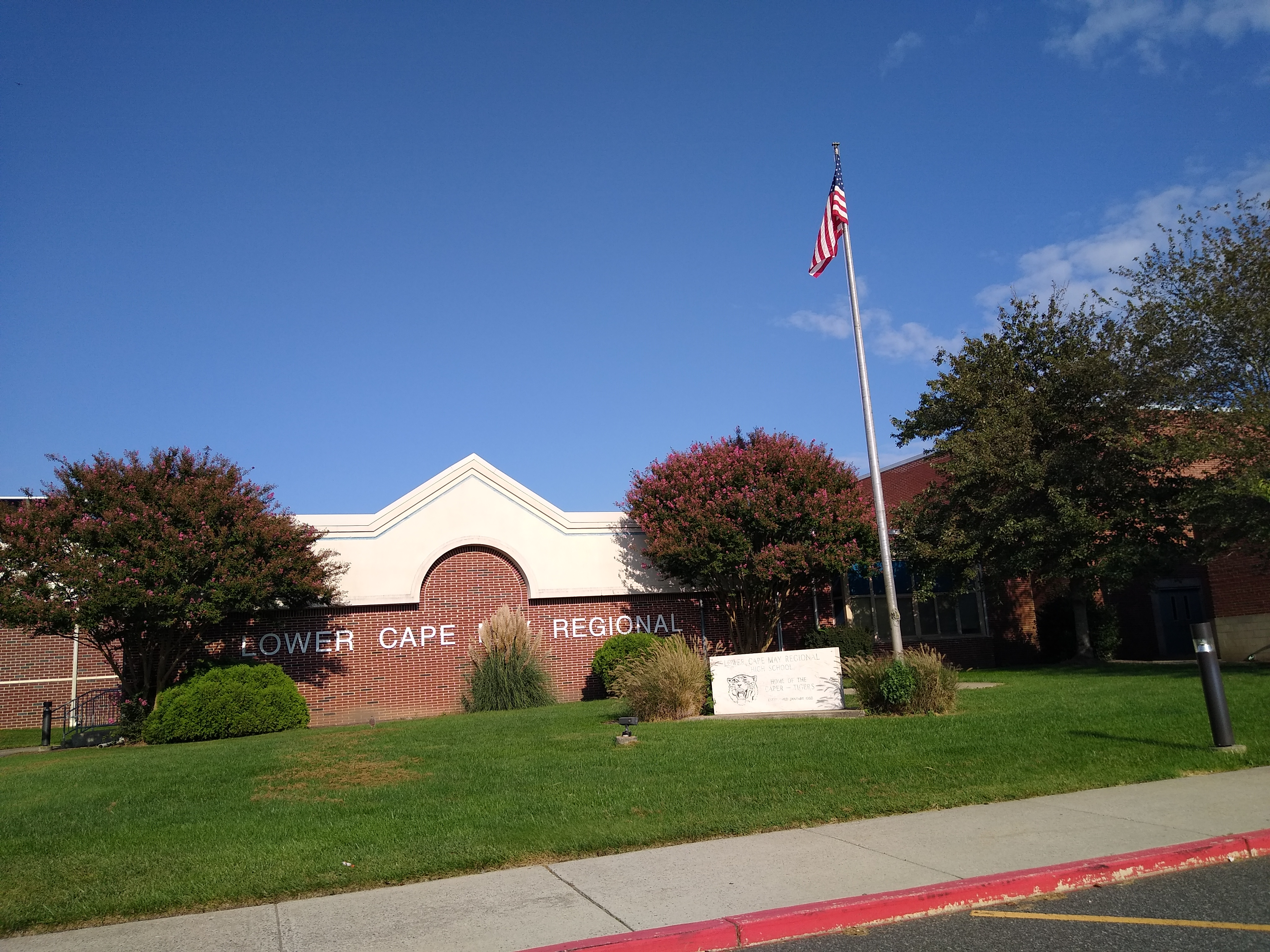
Lower Cape May Regional High School in the Erma area

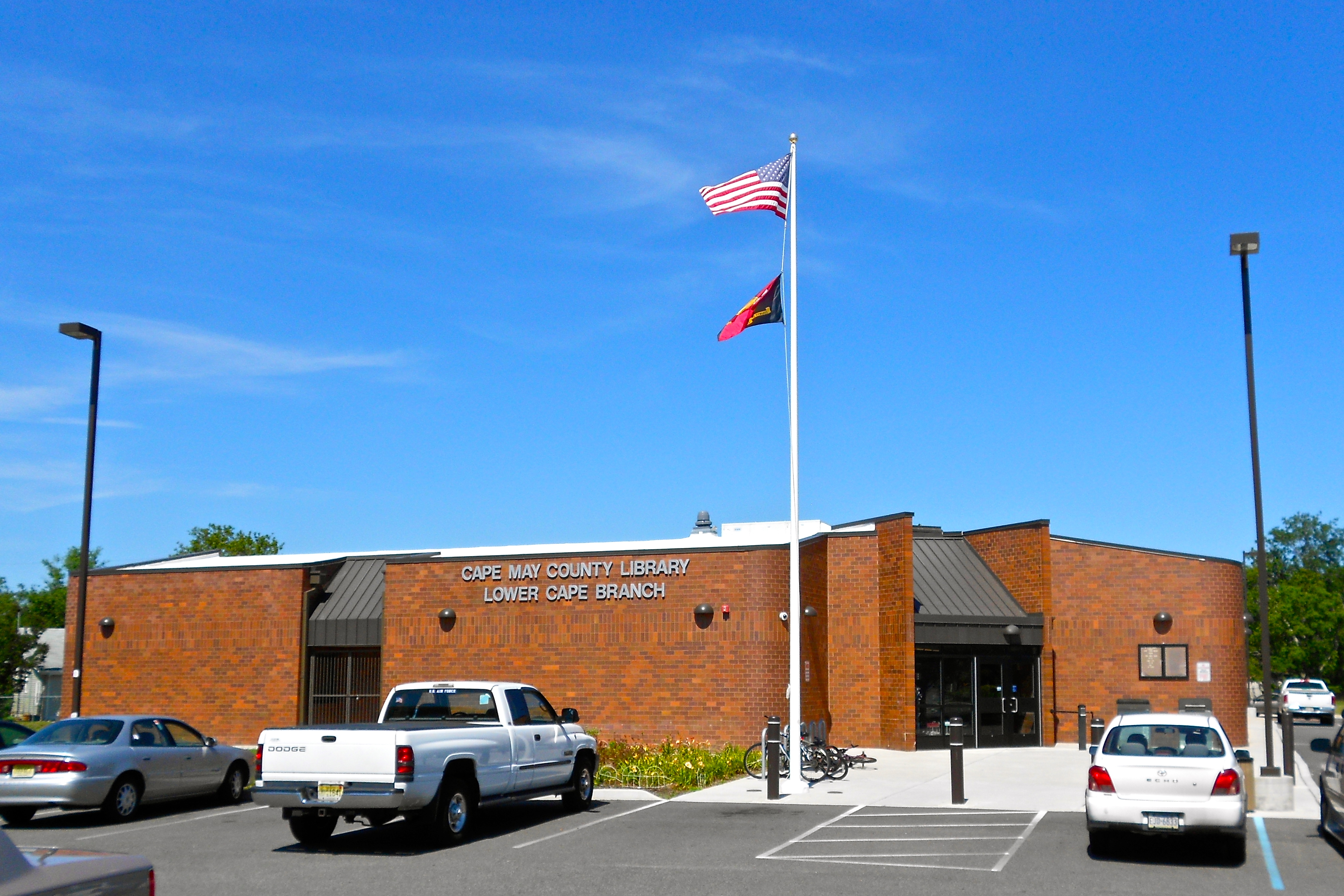
Lower Township Branch, Cape May Library, on Bayshore Road in Villas CDP

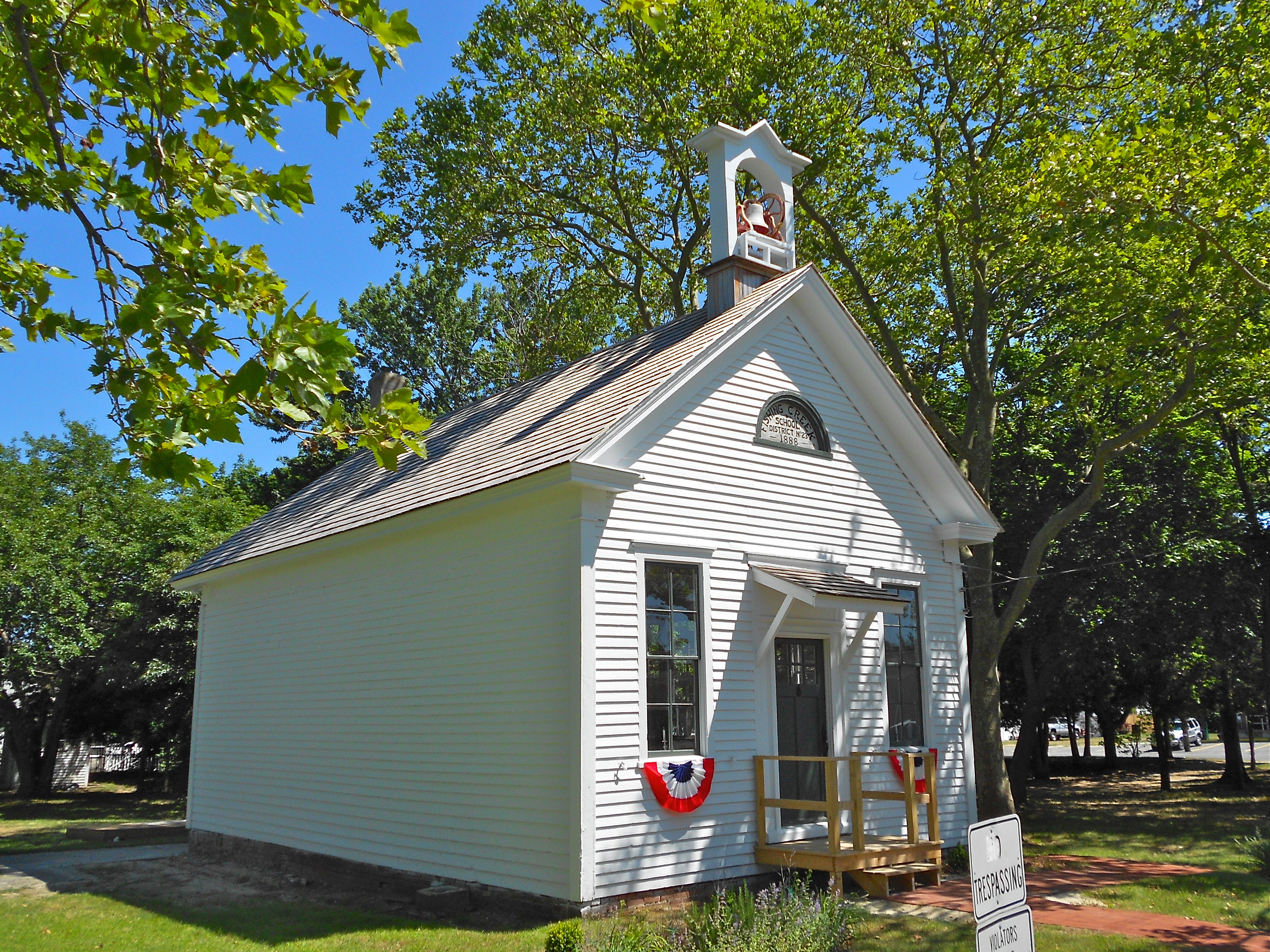
Fishing Creek Schoolhouse

Lower Township School District serves public-school students in pre-kindergarten through sixth grade. As of the 2024–25 school year, the district, comprised of four schools, had an enrollment of 1,401 students and 129.0 classroom teachers (on an FTE basis), for a student–teacher ratio of 10.9:1. Schools in the district (with 2024–25 enrollment data from the National Center for Education Statistics) are David C. Douglass Veterans Memorial School with 275 students in grades PreK–K, Carl T. Mitnick School with 428 students in grades 1-2 Maud T. Abrams School with 354 students in grades 3–4 and Charles W. Sandman Consolidated School with 332 students in grades 5–6.

For seventh through twelfth grades, public school students attend the schools of the Lower Cape May Regional School District, which also serves students from Cape May City and West Cape May, along with students from Cape May Point who attend the district as part of a sending/receiving relationship. Schools in the district (with 2024–25 enrollment data from the National Center for Education Statistics) are Richard M. Teitelman Middle School with 394 students in grades 7-8 and Lower Cape May Regional High School with 717 students in grades 9-12. In the 2011–12 school year, the city of Cape May paid $6 million in property taxes to cover the district's 120 high-school students, an average of $50,000 per student attending the Lower Cape May district. Cape May officials have argued that the district's funding formula based on assessed property values unfairly penalizes Cape May, which has higher property values and a smaller number of high-school students as a percentage of the population than the other constituent districts, especially Lower Township. The district's board of education is comprisedof nine members, who are elected directly by voters to serve three-year terms of office on a staggered basis, with three seats up for election each year Seats on the board are allocated based on population, with Lower Township assigned seven seats.

Students are also eligible to attend Cape May County Technical High School in Cape May Court House, which serves students from the entire county in its comprehensive and vocational programs, which are offered without charge to students who are county residents. Special needs students may be referred to Cape May County Special Services School District in Cape May Court House.

Wildwood Catholic Academy (Pre-K–12) in North Wildwood, of the Roman Catholic Diocese of Camden, is the nearest Catholic school. Villas had its own Catholic K–8 school, St. Raymond's School, until 2007, when it merged into Our Lady Star of the Sea School in Cape May. In 2010 Our Lady Star of the Sea merged into Cape Trinity Regional School (Pre-K–8) in North Wildwood. That school in turn merged into Wildwood Catholic Academy in 2020. As of 2020 Bishop McHugh Regional School in Dennis Township takes students from Lower Township.

Two of the initial properties of Cape Christian Academy, formed c. 1990 as a merger of South Cape Christian Academy and Cape May County Christian School were in Lower Township. The current consolidated school building is in Middle Township, with a Cape May Courthouse postal address and within the CMCH census-designated place. Richard Degener of the Press of Atlantic City described it as being in Burleigh. Its campus has 6.5 acres (2.6 ha) of area.

Cape May County Library operates the Lower Township Library in Villas.

== Transportation ==
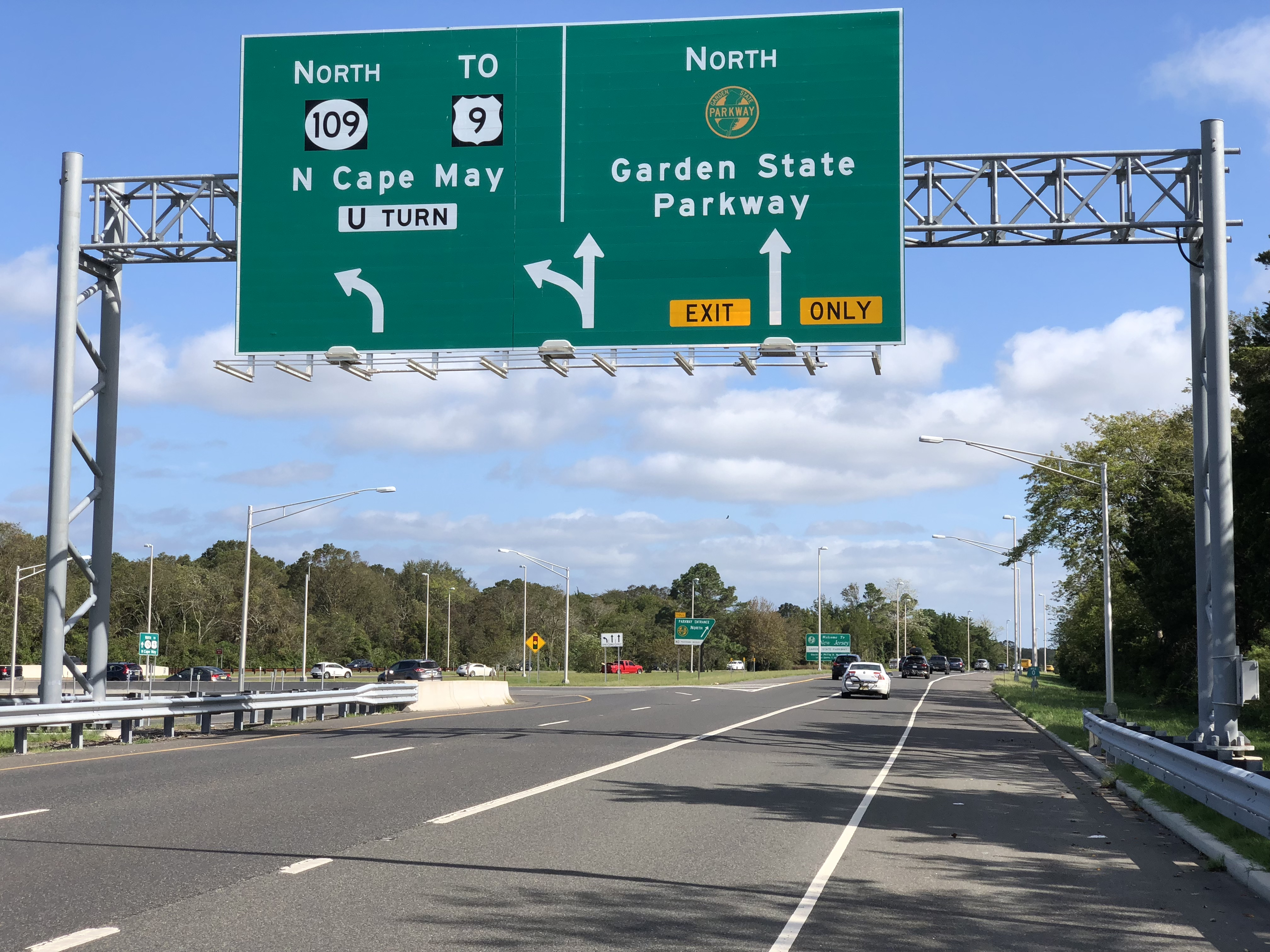
The Garden State Parkway northbound in Lower Township

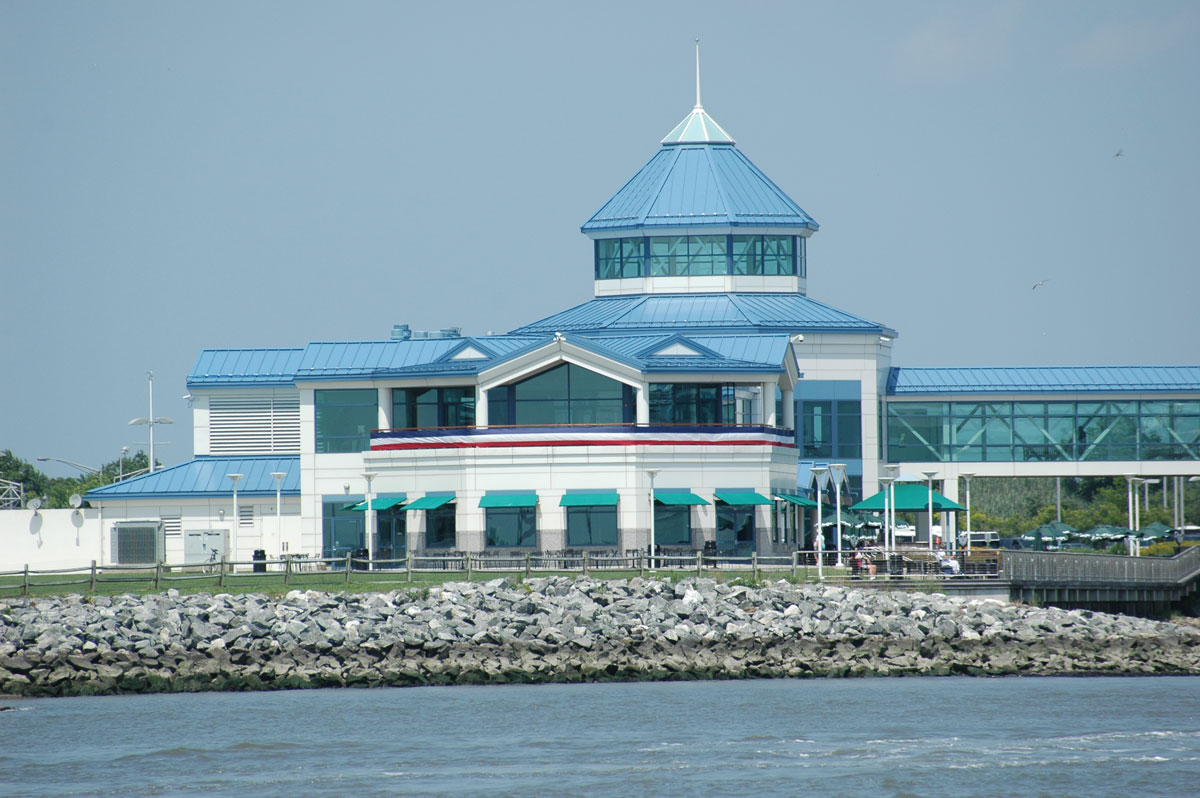
Cape May–Lewes Ferry terminal of the Cape May–Lewes Ferry

=== Roads and highways ===
As of May 2010, the township had a total of 179.10 miles (288.23 km) of roadways, of which 131.92 miles (212.30 km) were maintained by the municipality, 33.83 miles (54.44 km) by Cape May County and 6.87 miles (11.06 km) by the New Jersey Department of Transportation and 6.48 miles (10.43 km) by the New Jersey Turnpike Authority.

The most prominent highway serving Lower Township is the Garden State Parkway, which has its southern terminus at the intersection with Route 109, in the township. U.S. Route 9, Route 109, Route 162, and Ocean Drive are other significant roadways within Lower Township.

=== Public transportation ===
NJ Transit offers bus service on the 313 and 315 routes between Cape May / Wildwood / Philadelphia, on the 552 between Cape May and Atlantic City, with seasonal service on the 319 route serving shore points between Cape May and the Port Authority Bus Terminal in New York City's Midtown Manhattan.

The Cape May–Lewes Ferry terminal is located in North Cape May. Operated by the Delaware River and Bay Authority, the ferry makes the 17-mile (27 km) trip between Lower Township and Lewes, Delaware in 85 minutes, carrying passengers and vehicles. The Delaware River and Bay Authority operates a shuttle bus service that connects the ferry terminal with the Cape May Transportation Center in Cape May in the summer months and to the Cape May County Park & Zoo in July and August.

Cape May Airport is in Lower Township.

== Parks and recreation ==
Lower Township maintains the Lower Township Recreation Complex, the Clem Mulligan Sports Complex, Millman Community Center, and Rotary Park in Villas. David Douglass Memorial Park (Canal Park), Mindy Park, and Lower Township Pool are in North Cape May. Diamond Beach Park is in Diamond Beach. Freeman Douglass Park (Bennett's Crossing) is in Erma. The township recreation department also has Mitnick Park (Jonathan Hoffman).

Cape May County maintains the Lower Cape Senior Center in Villas.

== Points of interest ==
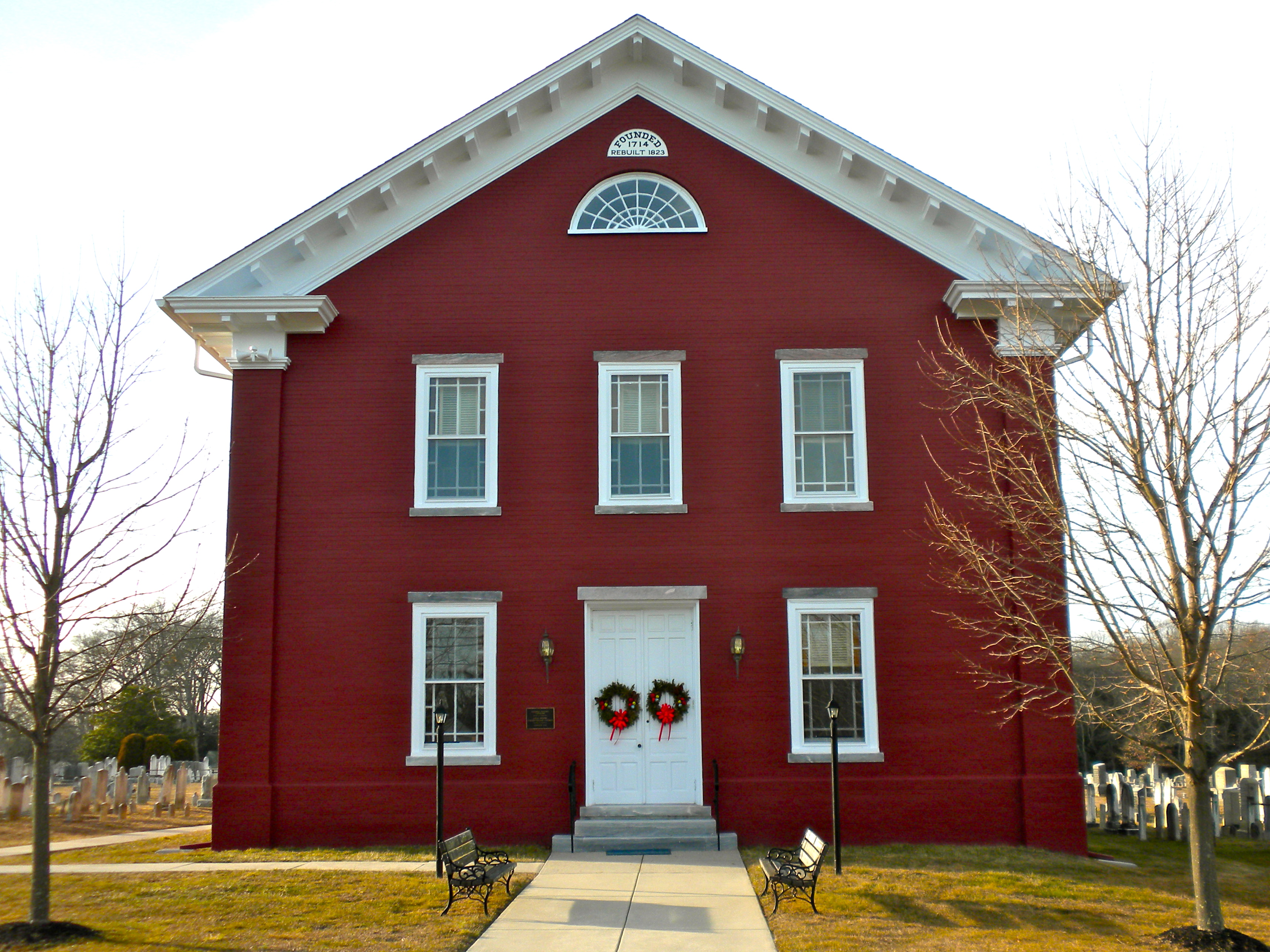
Cold Spring Presbyterian Church

- Battery 223
- Cape May Lighthouse
- Cape May Winery & Vineyard
- Owen Coachman House
- Cold Spring Grange Hall
- Cold Spring Presbyterian Church
- Fire Control Tower No. 23
- Fishing Creek Schoolhouse
- George Hildreth House
- Hawk Haven Vineyard & Winery
- Historic Cold Spring Village
- Jonathan Pyne House
- Naval Air Station Wildwood Aviation Museum
- Rio Grande Station
- Turdo Vineyards & Winery

== Notable people ==
People who were born in, residents of, or otherwise closely associated with Lower Township include:

- Bob Andrzejczak (born 1986), politician who represented the 1st Legislative District in the New Jersey General Assembly from 2013 to 2019 and in the New Jersey Senate in 2019
- Maurice Catarcio (1929–2005), professional wrestler for the World Wrestling Federation and record holder in The Guinness Book of World Records
- Madie Gibson (born 1997), association footballer who plays as a forward or winger for League of Ireland club Athlone Town
- T. Millet Hand (1902–1956), politician who represented New Jersey's 2nd congressional district in the United States House of Representatives from 1945 to 1956
- Chris Jay, (born 1978), musician, screenwriter, actor and member of the band Army of Freshmen
- Michael Linnington (born 1958), CEO of Wounded Warrior Project
- Charles W. Sandman Jr. (1921–1985), politician who represented New Jersey's 2nd congressional district from 1967 to 1975
- Erik K. Simonsen, politician who represents the 1st Legislative District in the New Jersey General Assembly and had served as mayor of Lower Township from 2016 until 2020
- Matt Szczur (born 1989), Major League Baseball outfielder
