= Battery 223 =

- U.S. National Register of Historic Places
- New Jersey Register of Historic Places
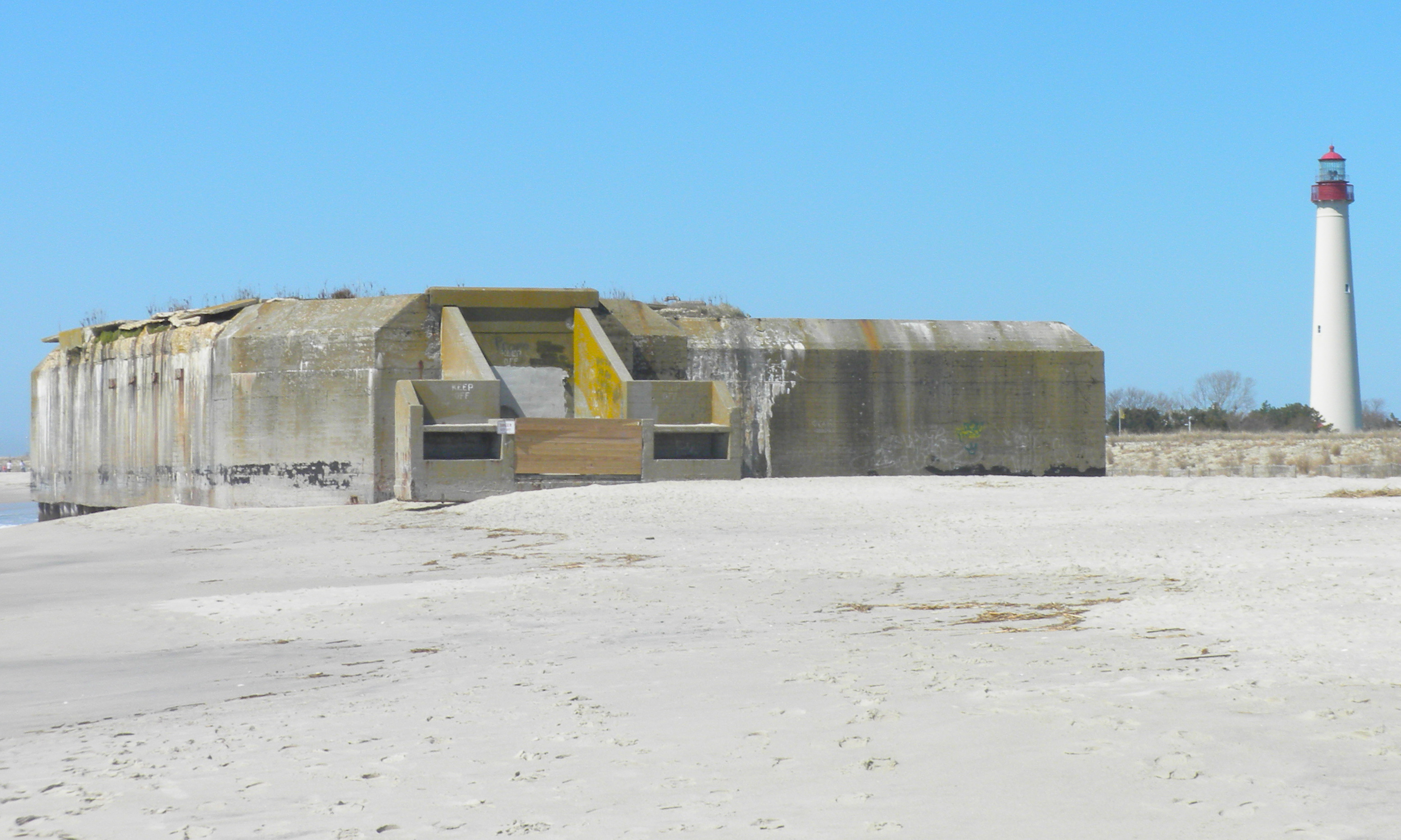

- Location within Cape May County, New Jersey Location within New Jersey Location within the United States
- Location: Beach at Cape May State Park, Lower Township, New Jersey
- Coordinates: 38.931489°N 74.955533°W
- Built: 1942
- Architects: U.S. Army Corps of Engineers; White Construction
- Architectural style: Mid 20th century
- NRHP reference No.: 08000555
- NJRHP No.: 4770

Significant dates
- Added to NRHP: June 25, 2008
- Designated NJRHP: April 14, 2008

Battery 223 is in Lower Township, Cape May County, New Jersey, United States. The harbor defense battery was completed in 1943. It was added to the National Register of Historic Places on June 25, 2008.

== History ==
In the years before the entry of the U.S. into World War II, the belief that America's shore defenses were inadequate resulted in the 1940 Modernization of the Coastal Defense program. Battery 223 was part of the effort to address the advances of offensive and defensive technology in the 1930s. Standardized and mass-produced fortifications were built on both the east and west coasts.

Battery 223 was one of three 200-series fortifications built for Fort Miles, headquartered in Cape Henlopen, Delaware. Designed to host a 6-inch battery and survive a direct hit from battleships and aircraft, the structure was built with six-foot thick reinforced concrete walls and a thick blast proof roof; the entire building was covered with earth. The 6-inch guns had a nine-mile range.

In addition to the three 200-series batteries, Fort Miles also had a 16-inch and a 12-inch battery, both at Cape Henlopen. The 16-inch guns had a range of 26 miles. In all, assets of Fort Miles extended along 200 miles of shoreline, including a network of 20 fire control towers.

Battery 223's guns were never fired at an enemy, though there were drills and live fire tests. As the war turned in favor of the Allies, lessening the need for coastal defense, and continuing advances in warfare technology rendered fixed coastal defenses obsolete, the Modernization of the Coastal Defense program was never completed. Battery 223 was decommissioned in 1944; all army seacoast defense guns had been scrapped by 1948. By 1950, the army had dismantled all of the fixed gun harbor defenses; the buildings were used for other military purposes or were declared surplus.

Battery 223 was used for radio communications by the navy at some point after 1958, a concrete pad was poured on the top the building to support a Quonset hut. Battery 223 became part of the Cape May Point State Park in 1962. Today the battery is no longer covered and is in full view.

View of Battery 223 from the Cape May Lighthouse

== Architecture ==
The exterior of the building is a series of windowless blocks of formed concrete. It is roughly T-shaped, the long portion runs east–west parallel to the beach, the stem of the T extends to the north. It contains 20 rooms, including a plotting room, switchboard room, latrine, several shell storage rooms, a chemical warfare service room, and an airlock. The airlock provided protection against chemical attack. Wood pilings support the building.

Power was provided by three diesel generators with a gallery of exhaust pipes and mufflers, evaporative water coolers were in a separate room. The switchboard room connected the plotting room to the external fire control towers. The plotting room received coordinates from two towers, which were then used to triangulate the target and produce gun aiming directions.

== See also ==
- Seacoast defense in the United States
- National Register of Historic Places listings in Cape May County, New Jersey
