= Cape May Point State Park =

State park in Cape May County, New Jersey

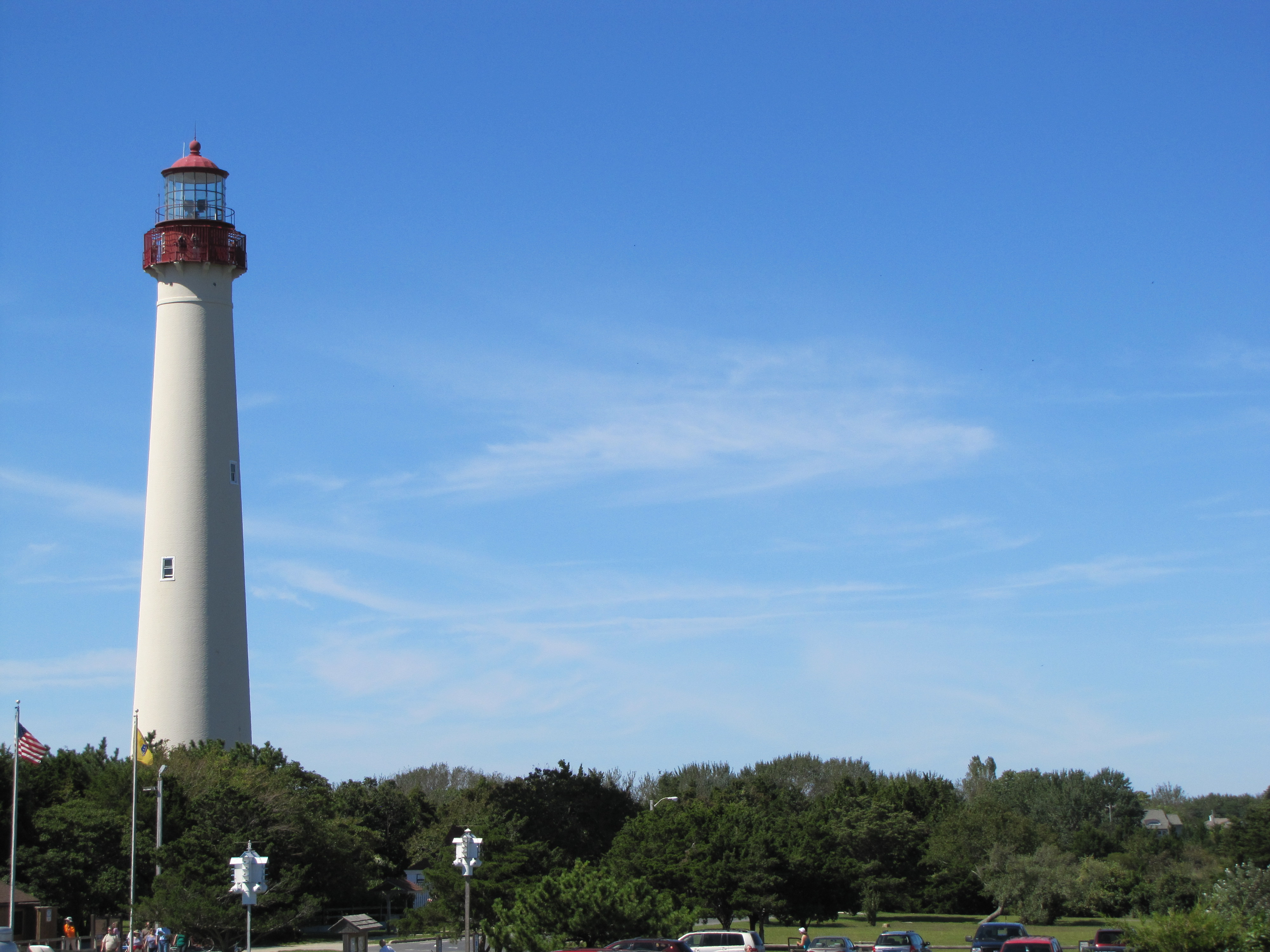
- Cape May Lighthouse

- Location within New Jersey Location within the United States
- Location: Lower Township
- Coordinates: 38°55′59″N 74°57′39″W
- Area: 244 acres (0.99 km^{2})
- Website: Official website

Cape May Point State Park is a 244 acres (0.99 km^{2}) state park located in Lower Township, New Jersey, with a Cape May Point postal address. The park offers walking, hiking and nature trails as well as beaches, an exhibit gallery, a ranger office and is the site of the Cape May Light. The park is operated and maintained by the New Jersey Division of Parks and Forestry.

== Birding ==
Cape May Point State Park is considered to be one of the best places in North America to view the Fall bird migration to the south. The location attracts migratory birds of the eastern seaboard looking for cover and food as they await favorable winds to cross the Delaware Bay. Because of this, birding is one of the most prominent activities conducted at the park.

In 1935, the National Audubon Society leased 25 acres of land in what is now the state park, for the creation of a wild life sanctuary named the Witmer Stone Wild Life Sanctuary after the noted ornithologist. The sanctuary expanded to 1,000 acres, however in 1941, a magnesite factory for the production of fire brick needed to produce steel for the war effort was located in the middle of the sanctuary. The emissions from the factory damaged the flora and fauna of the sanctuary and the lease and sanctuary were abandoned in 1959.

Every fall, visitors converge from across the country to witness the migration of most types of North American migratory birds in great numbers. Every year the a hawk watch is also held, in which the numbers of various types of migratory birds of prey are counted during a several month period.

Birds can be seen in the Park at three areas. These are the hawk watching platform (for hawks), the nature and hiking trails (for songbirds) and the beach (shorebirds). For the most part, birds of many varieties can be seen at all of these areas year round.

== Trails ==
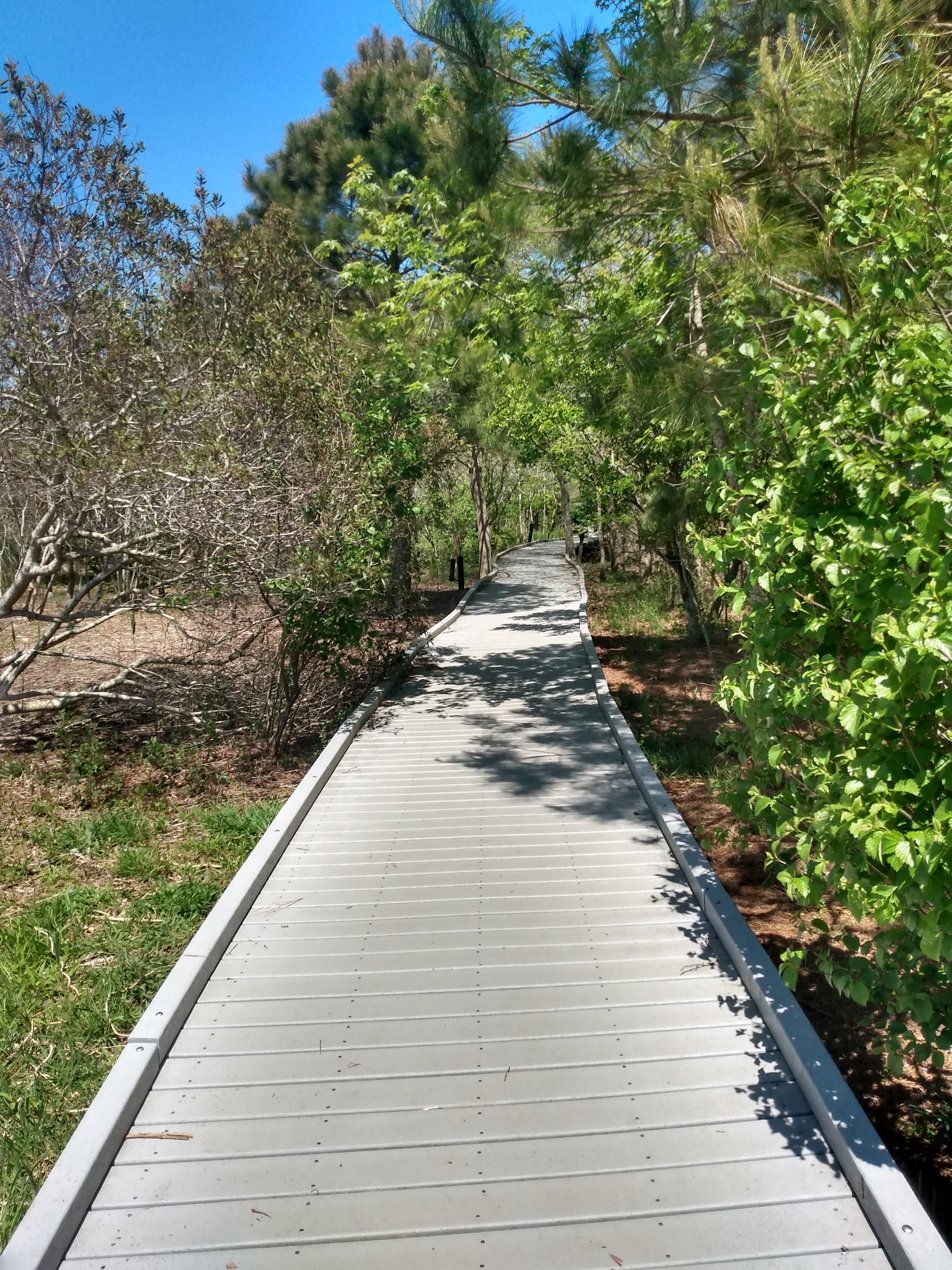
The Yellow Trail

The park has three hiking trails, each designated by a color. All three start and end at the parking lot. The Red trail, a boardwalk trail which is wheelchair accessible, is 0.5 mi (0.80 km) long. It has several observation platforms. The Yellow trail is 1.5 mi (2.4 km) long and is part boardwalk and part dirt. It begins from the red trail and has one additional birding platform. The Blue trail, closed for a long time due to hurricane damage in the 1960s, reopened again in the 1990s. It is 2.0 mi (3.2 km) long, part of which is on the beach.

The park's trails and beach connect to the adjacent 200-acre South Cape May Meadows owned by The Nature Conservancy.

== Gun emplacements ==
During World War I and World War II the park was the Cape May Military Reservation. Remnants of a gun battery, part of the Harbor Defenses of the Delaware, can be seen today.

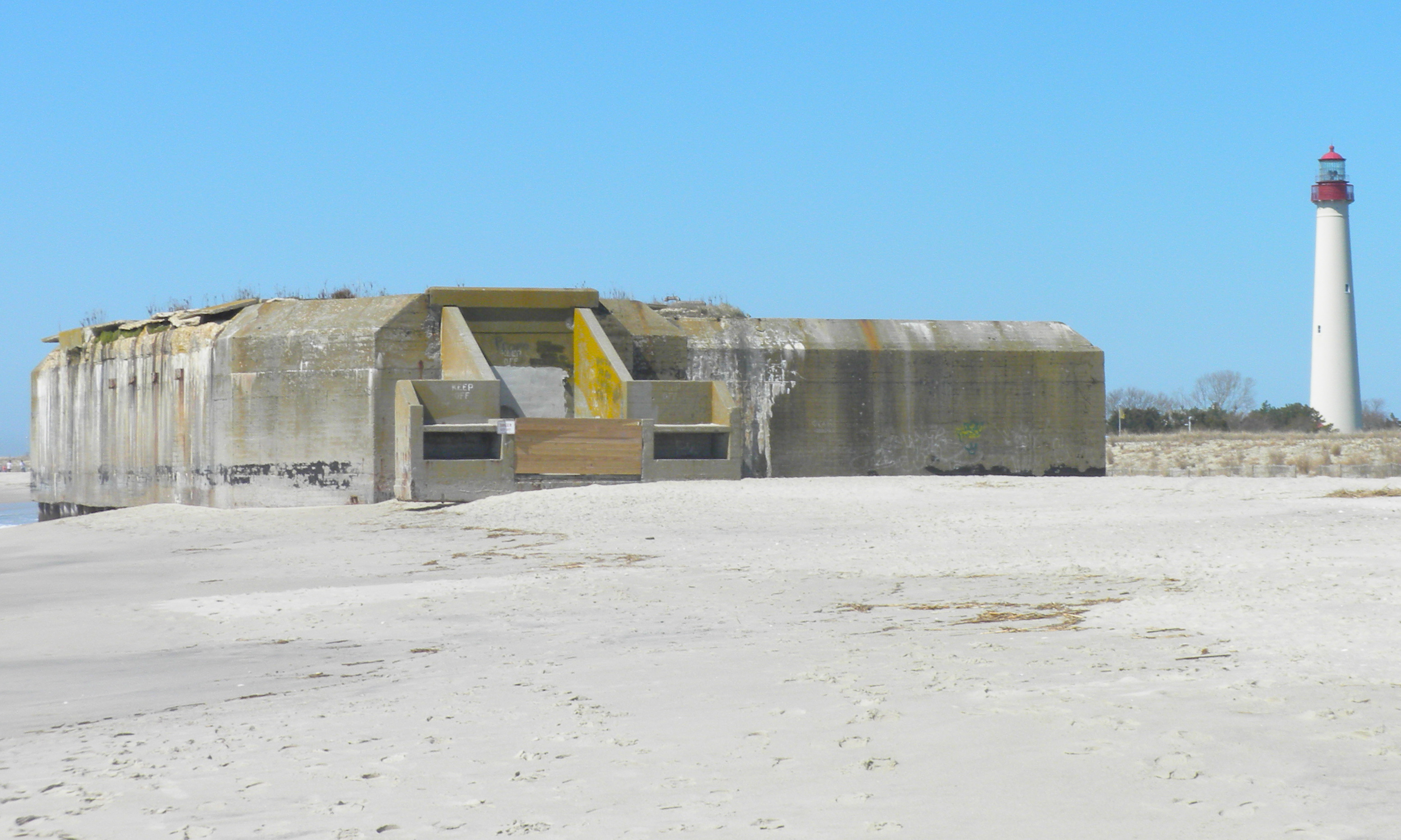
Battery 223 in 2010

A 6-inch gun was mounted near the former Coast Guard station in World War I, but the emplacement has been demolished. Three batteries were in the park area in World War II. These were Battery 223 with two 6-inch guns on shielded mounts, with an ammunition and fire control bunker between them, Battery 25 with four towed 155 mm guns on concrete Panama mounts, and Anti-Motor Torpedo Boat battery (AMTB) 7, with four 90 mm guns, two on fixed mounts and two on towed mounts. Only the bunker for Battery 223 remains visible, stripped of its original earth cover. A beach restoration project in 2005 covered the remains of the other emplacements.

== See also ==
- List of New Jersey state parks
