= Cape May Lighthouse =

Lighthouse in New Jersey, United States

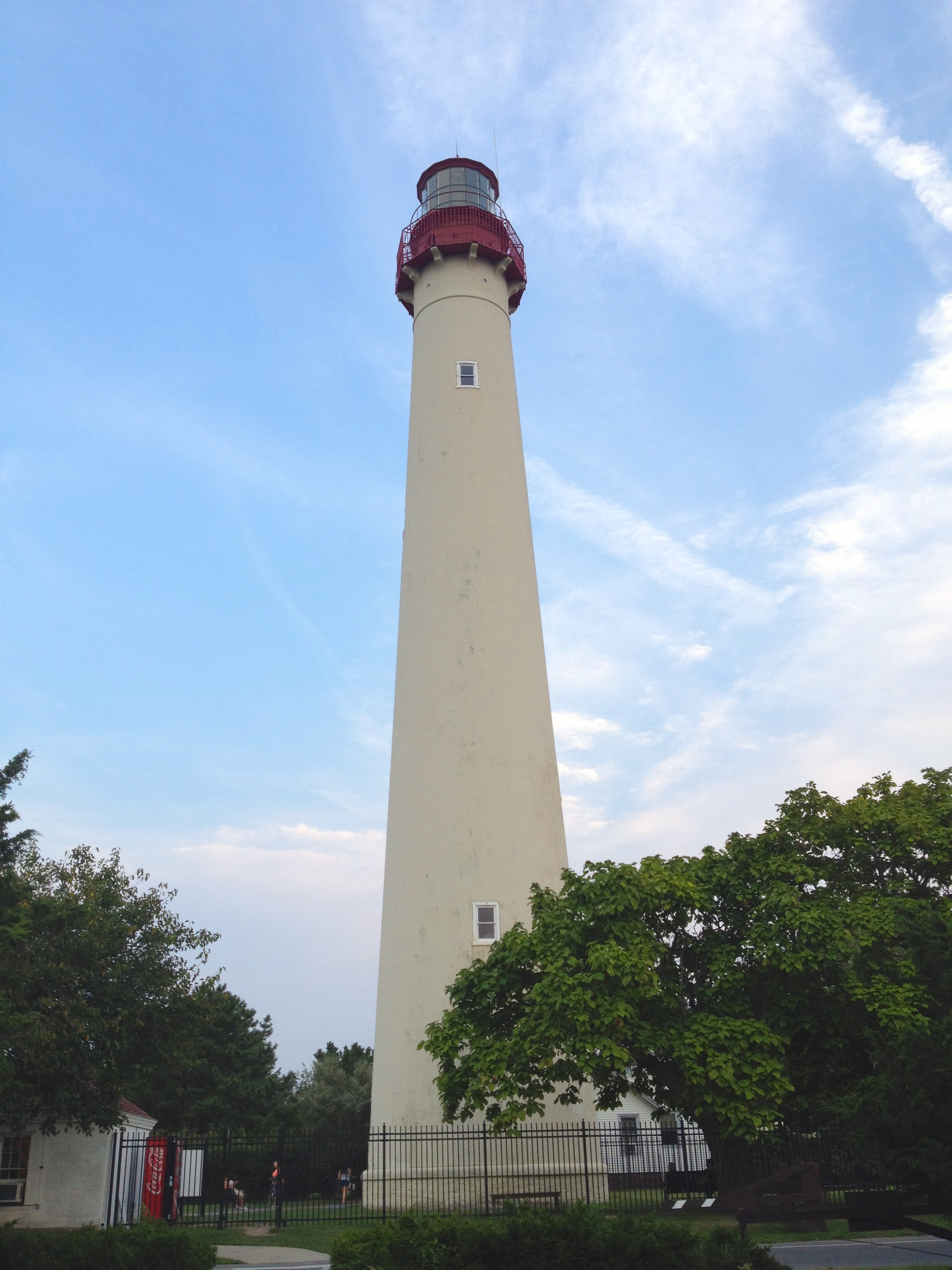
- Cape May Lighthouse
- Location: Lower Township, New Jersey
- Coordinates: 38°55′58.8″N 74°57′37.5″W

Tower
- Constructed: 1823
- Foundation: Surface rock
- Construction: Brick, biegetower, red cupola
- Automated: 1946
- Height: 157 feet (48 m) (165 feet (50 m) above sea level)
- Shape: Conical
- Heritage: National Register of Historic Places listed place

Light
- First lit: 1859; 167 years ago
- Deactivated: Active
- Focal height: 50 m (160 ft)
- Lens: First-order Fresnel lens (original), VRB-25 (current)
- Range: 24 nautical miles (44 km; 28 mi)
- Characteristic: White, Flashes every 15 sec
- Cape May Lighthouse
- U.S. National Register of Historic Places
- New Jersey Register of Historic Places
- NRHP reference No.: 73001090
- NJRHP No.: 998

Significant dates
- Added to NRHP: November 12, 1973
- Designated NJRHP: June 15, 1973

The Cape May Lighthouse is a lighthouse located in the U.S. state of New Jersey at the tip of Cape May, in Lower Township's Cape May Point State Park. It was built in 1859 under the supervision of U.S. Army engineer William F. Raynolds, was automated in 1946, and continues operation to this day.

Cape May Lighthouse is the third fully documented lighthouse to be built at Cape May Point. The first was built in 1823 and the second in 1847. The exact locations of the first two lighthouses are now underwater due to erosion. There are 199 steps to the top of the Lighthouse. The view from the top extends to Cape May City and Wildwood to the north, Cape May Point to the south, and, on a clear day, Cape Henlopen, Delaware, to the west. Within immediate view are Cape May Cove and Battery 223, a harbor defense battery originally built during World War II. Cape May Lighthouse was added to the National Register of Historic Places on November 12, 1973.

The Cape May Light is located in Lower Township, but is also a point of identity for Cape May Point as it uses the lighthouse as a logo for municipal-owned vehicles. Mayors of the two municipalities previously had a conflict over in which municipality it was located.

== Keepers ==
Harry Palmer was the keeper of the lighthouse until he became very ill. After this, his wife Florence Arabelle (Belle) Palmer became the lighthouse keeper, being granted the title Custodian of the Lighthouse in 1933.

== Operation ==
The lighthouse is owned by the state of New Jersey after ownership was transferred from the Coast Guard in 1992, which maintains it as an active aid to maritime navigation. The State of New Jersey leases the structure and grounds to the Mid-Atlantic Center for the Arts & Humanities (MAC). MAC raises funds for the restoration and upkeep of the structure and opens the lighthouse to the public for climbs to the top. MAC has installed interpretive exhibits about the lighthouse's history, the lives of the former lighthouse keepers, and other maritime history of the Jersey Cape for visitors who climb. In 2013, MAC celebrated the 25th anniversary of the opening of the lighthouse to the public for climbs. From its opening in May 1988, over 2.1 million people have paid to climb to the top. Every October, the Cape May Lighthouse is a participant in the New Jersey Lighthouse Challenge, a statewide event.

== Design ==
The tower is 157 feet 6 inches (48.01 m) tall, from the ground to the tower's cast iron spiral staircase. There are 217 steps from the ground to the top, with 199 steps in the tower's cast iron spiral staircase. The lighthouse has two separate walls. The outside wall is cone-shaped, and is 3 feet 10 inches (1.17 m) thick at the bottom, and 1 foot 6 inches (0.46 m) thick at the top. The inside wall is a cylinder with 8.5-inch-thick (220 mm) walls which support the spiral staircase. The walls were designed to withstand winds several times above hurricane force. The original revolving lens was manufactured by Henry Lepaute in Paris and has a 6-foot (1.8 m) inside diameter. This first-order Fresnel lens was moved to the Cape May County Courthouse.

== Gallery ==
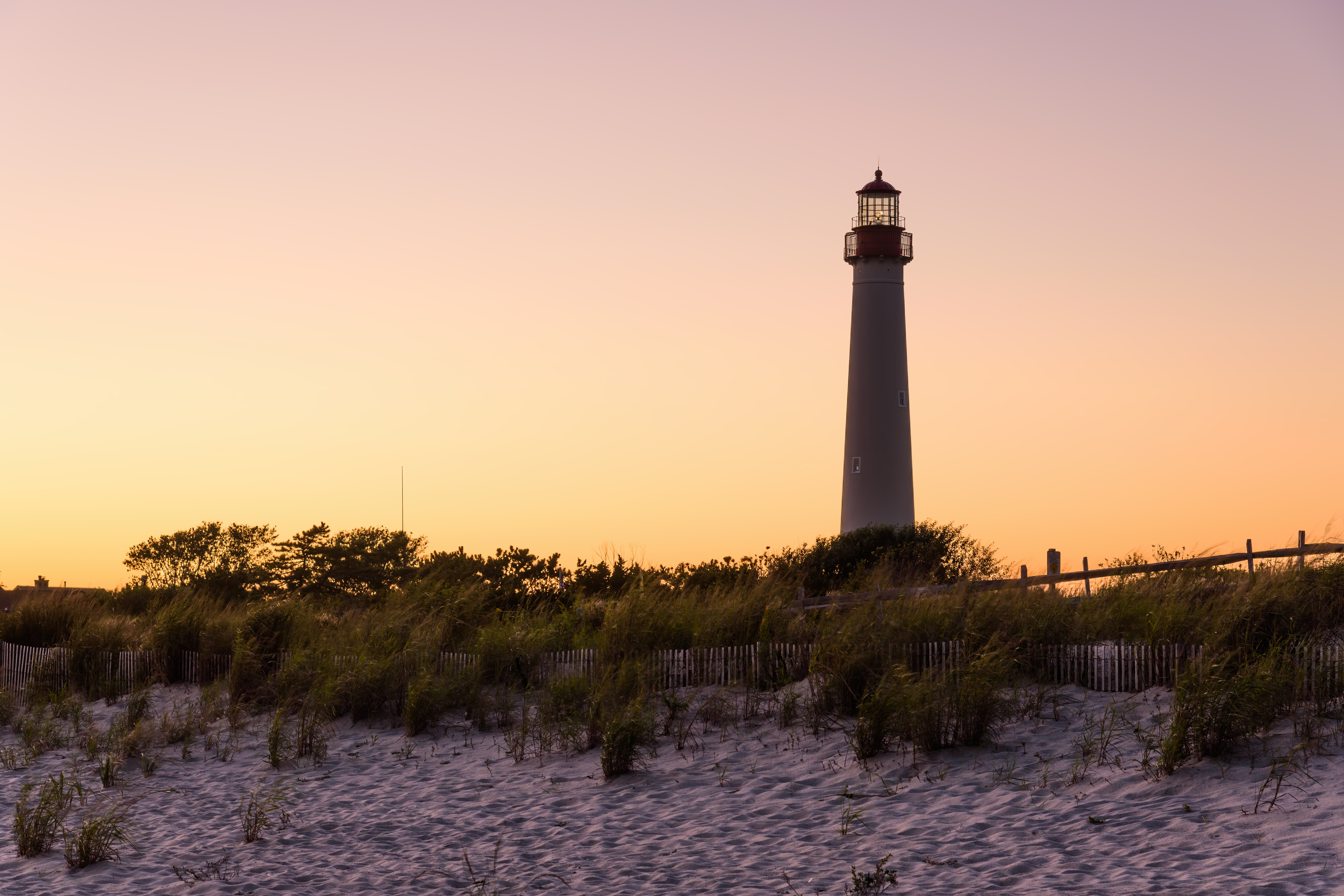
View from the beach at sunset

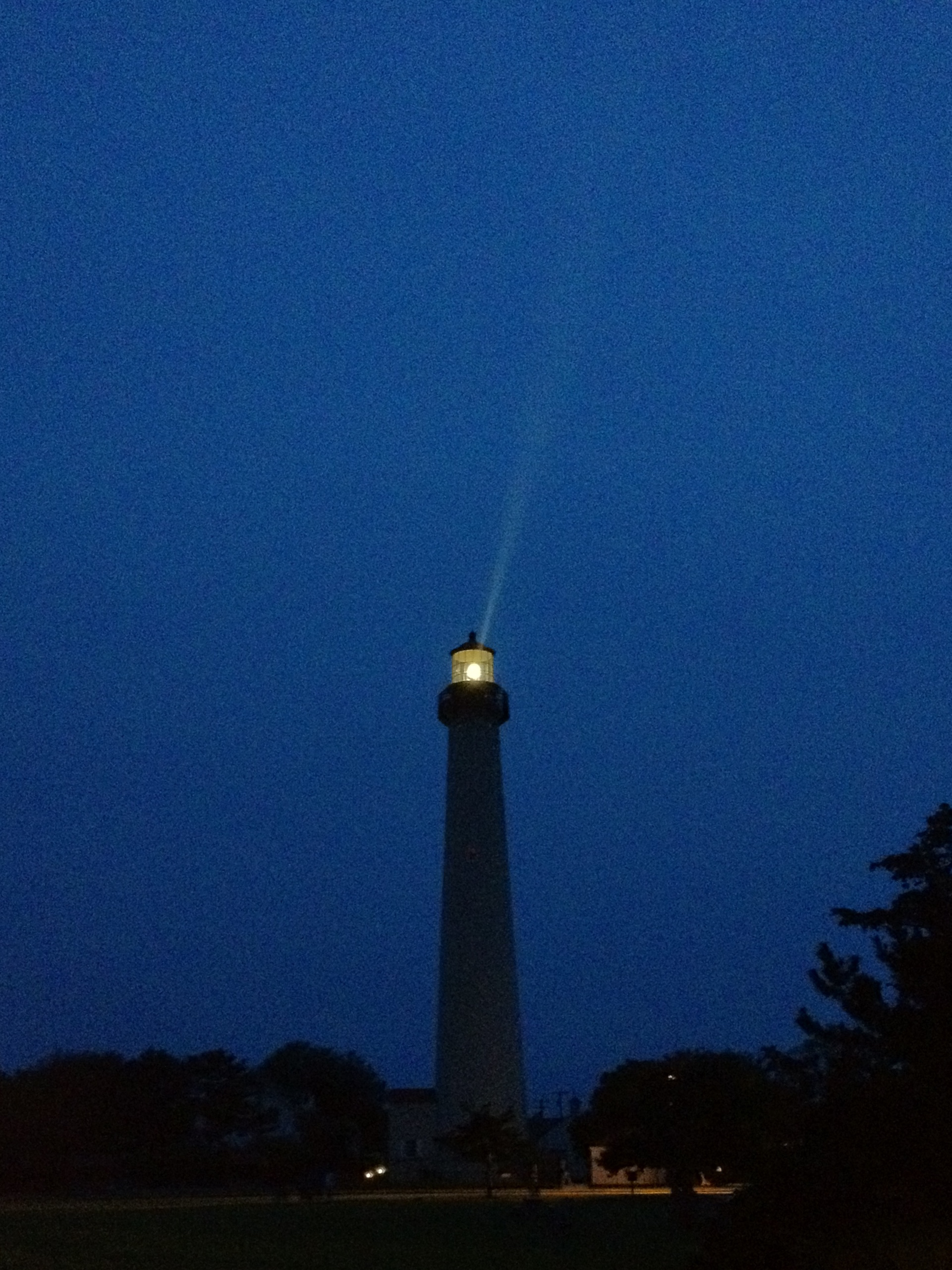
Cape May Lighthouse (early evening)

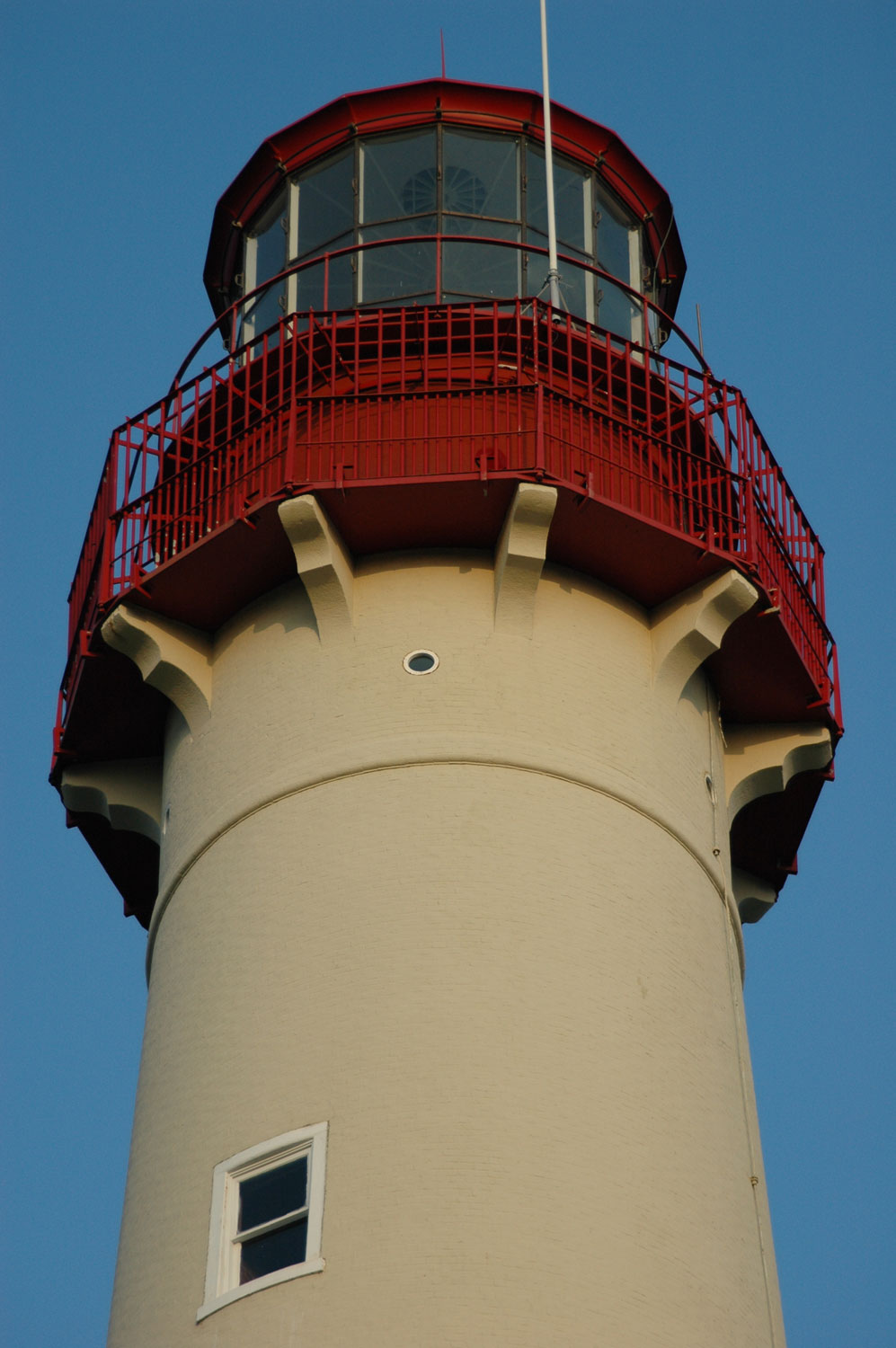
The top of the Cape May Lighthouse on July 4, 2005

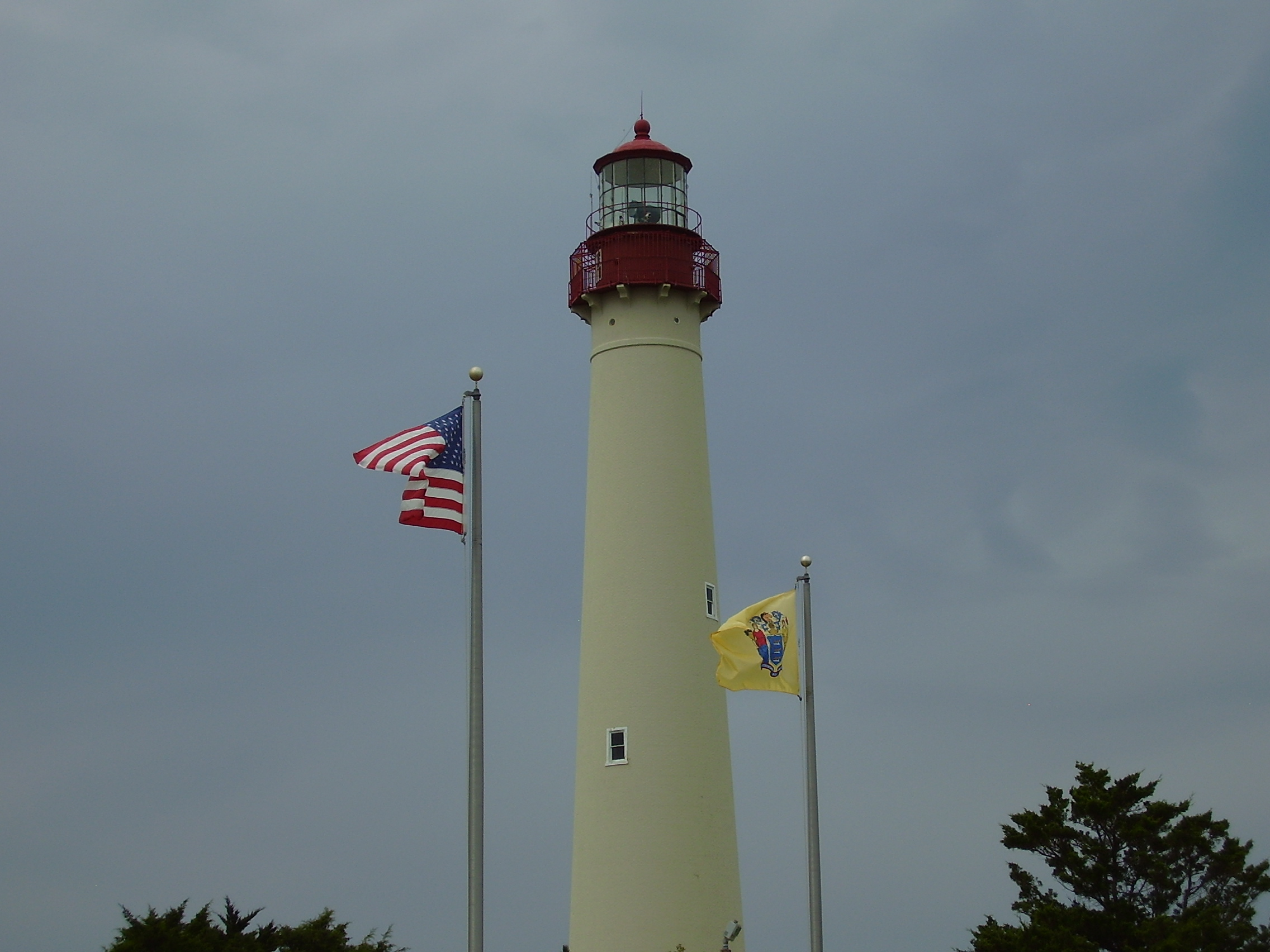
The US and NJ flags at Cape May Lighthouse

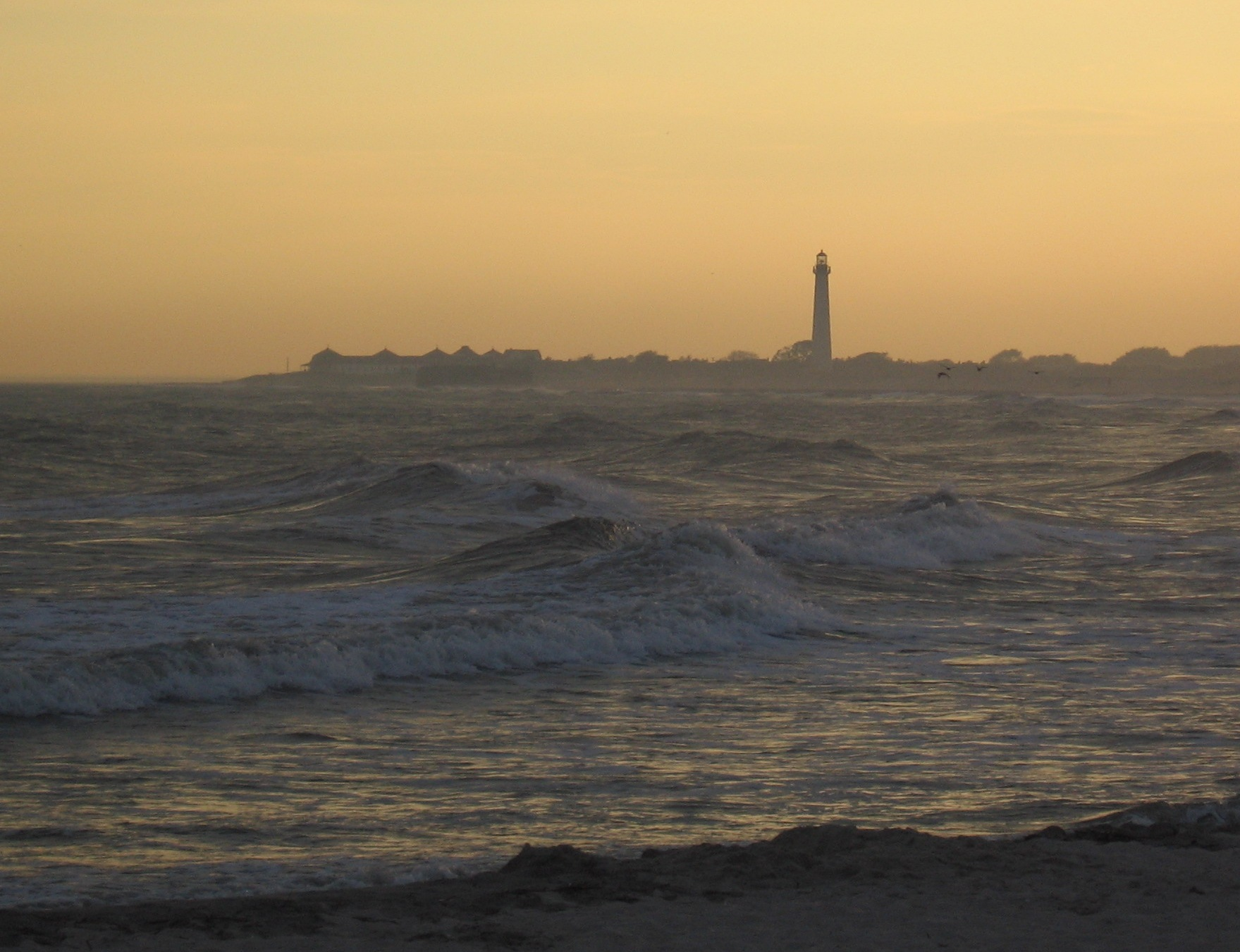
The lighthouse seen from the Cape May cove

View from the beach access

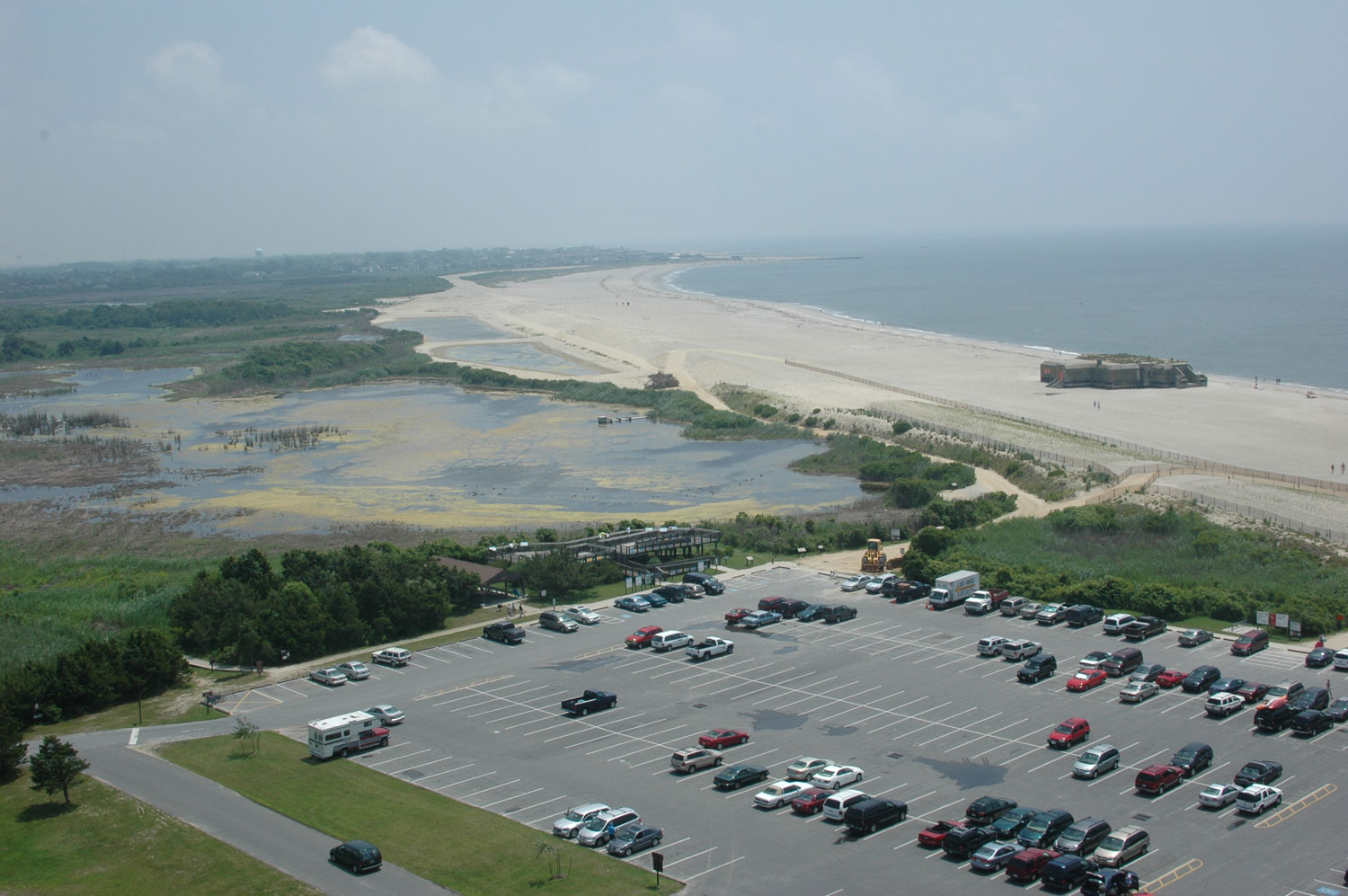
The view from the top of the Cape May Lighthouse on July 4, 2005

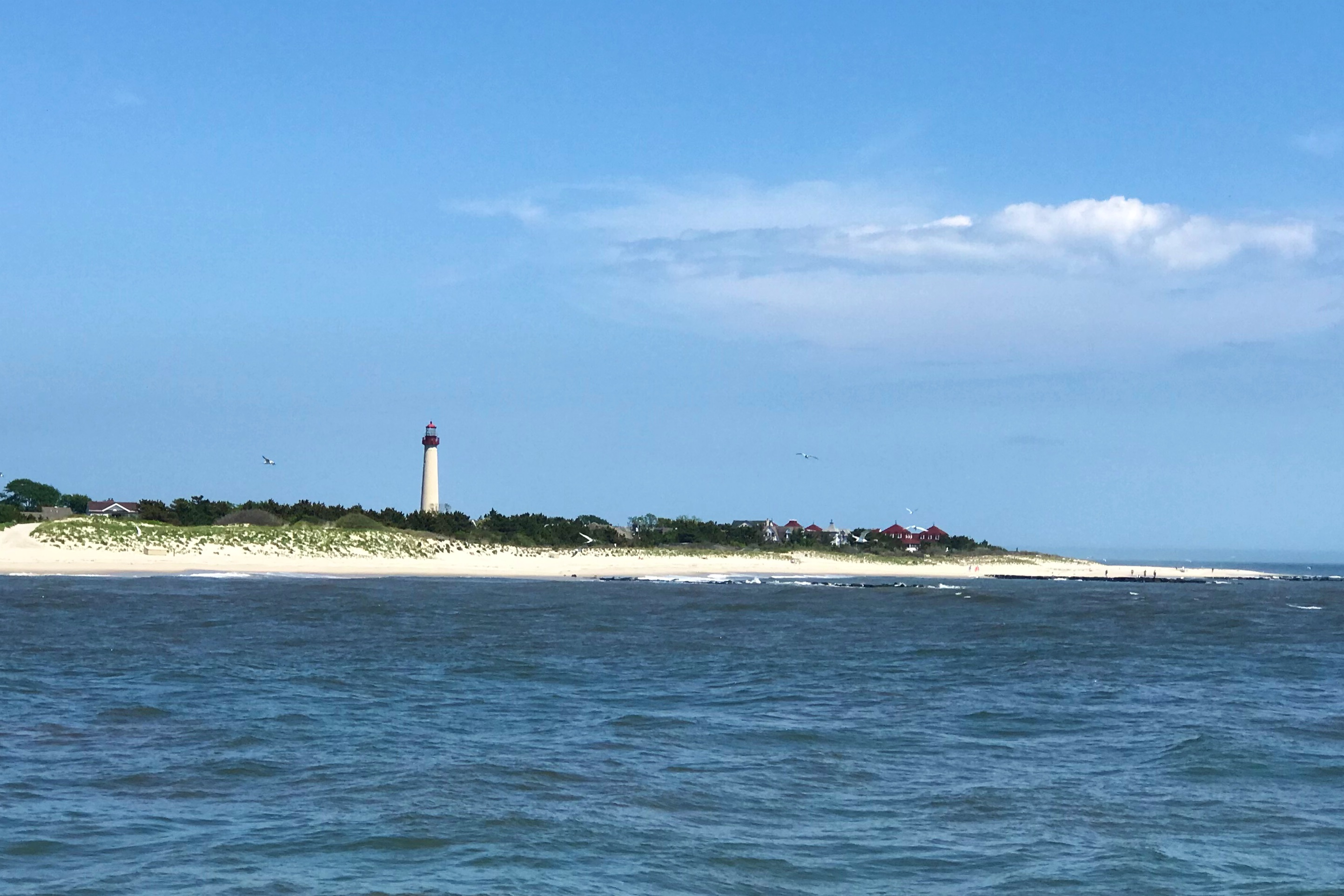
View from the Delaware Bay

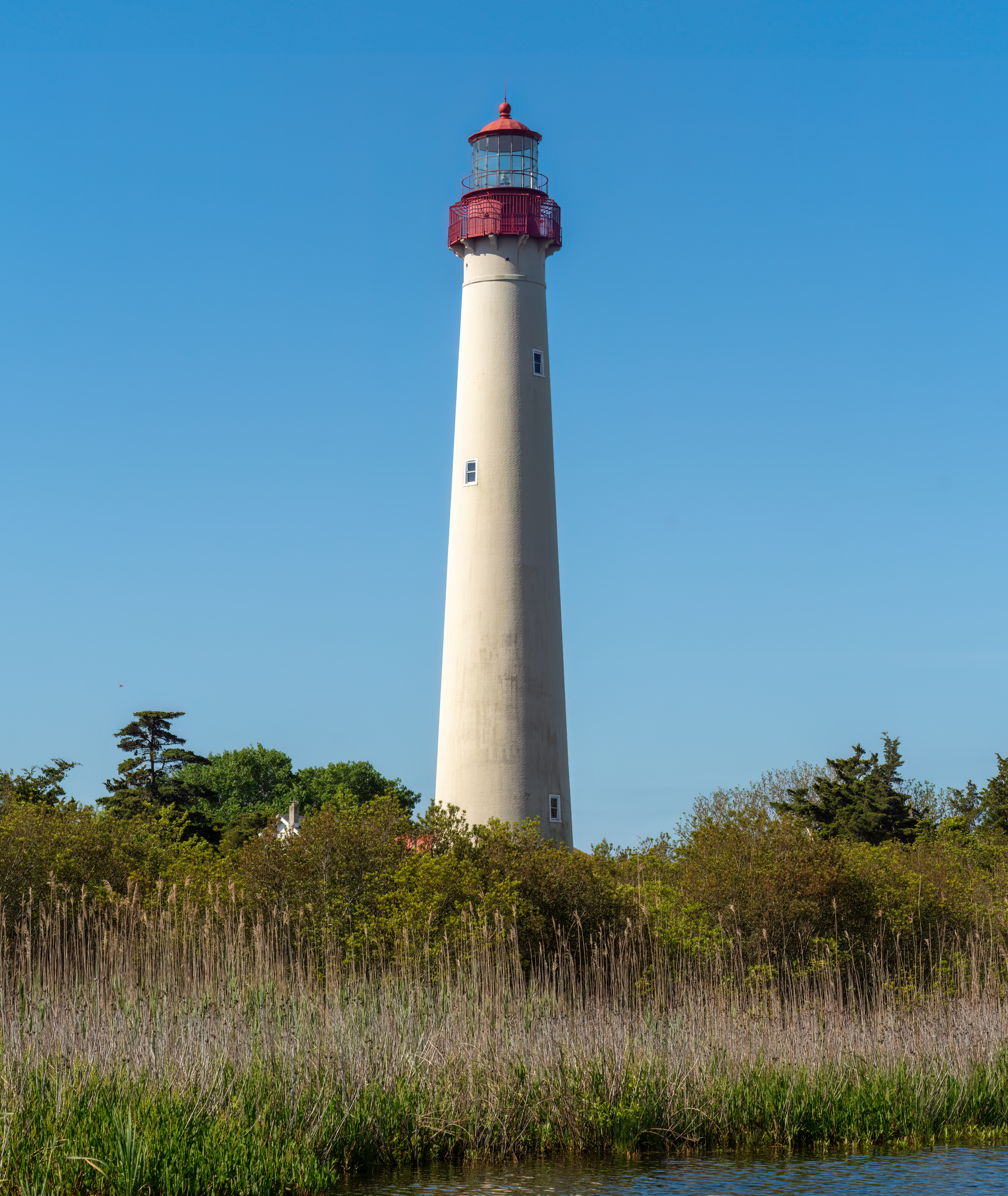
Lighthouse viewed from Lighthouse Pond

== See also ==
- National Register of Historic Places listings in Cape May County, New Jersey
