= Owen Coachman House =

Historic house in New Jersey, United States

- U.S. National Register of Historic Places
- New Jersey Register of Historic Places
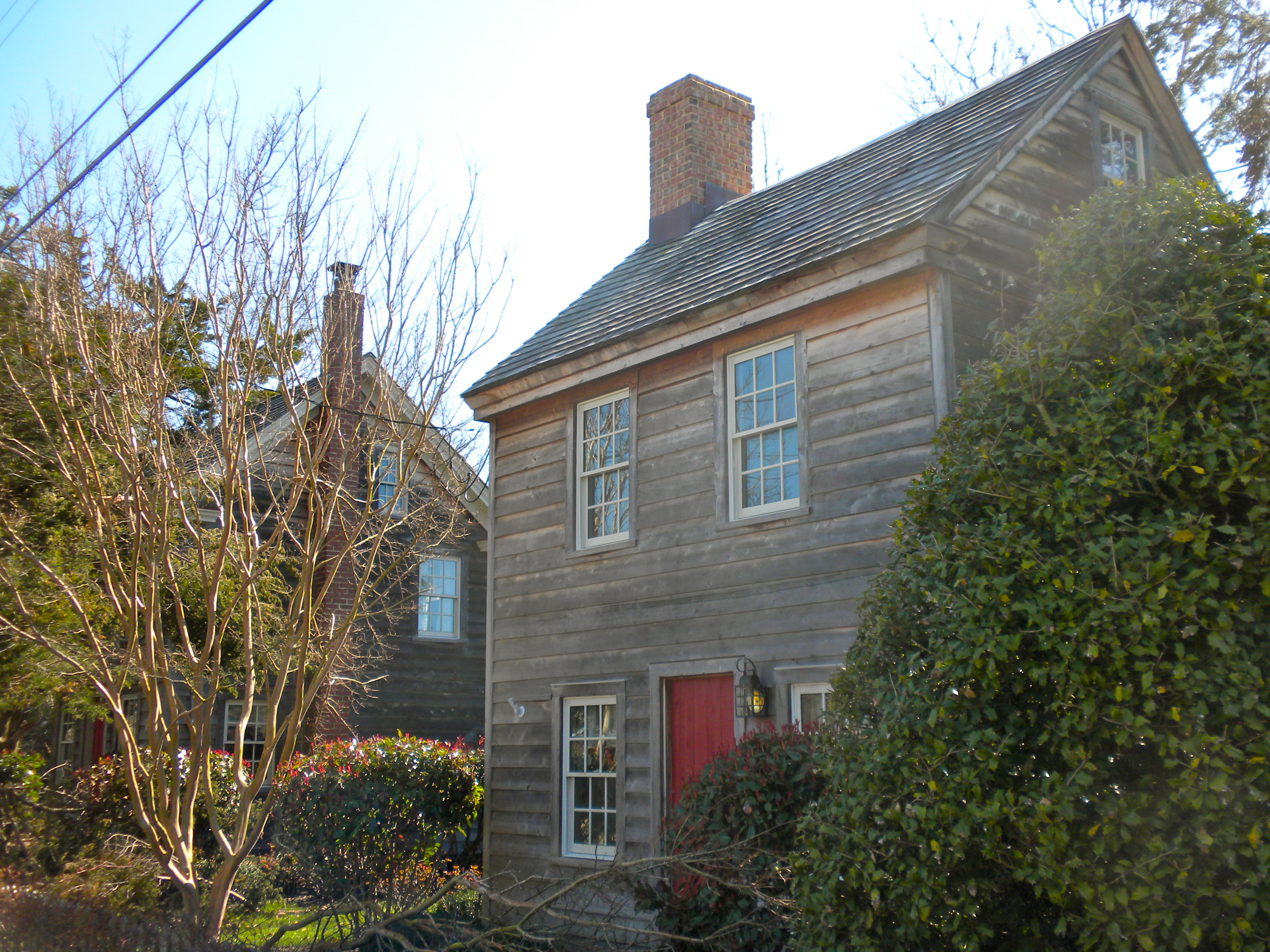

- Location within Cape May County, New Jersey Location within New Jersey Location within the United States
- Location: 1019 Batts Lane, Lower Township, New Jersey
- Coordinates: 38°57′36.6″N 74°55′45.4″W
- Built: c. 1695–1730
- Architectural style: Postmedieval English
- NRHP reference No.: 05000964
- NJRHP No.: 4459

Significant dates
- Added to NRHP: September 9, 2005
- Designated NJRHP: July 22, 2005

The Owen Coachman House, also known as the Batts Lane Whaler's Cottage, is located at 1019 Batts Lane in Lower Township of Cape May County, New Jersey, United States. The original one-room house was built between 1695 and 1730 in Town Bank along the Delaware Bay. It was moved to its present location off Shunpike Road on Cape Island in 1846 by Owen Coachman, a free Black land owner. It was added to the National Register of Historic Places on September 9, 2005, for its significance in architecture and ethnic heritage.

Restoration work performed on the property in the early 2000s won an award from the New Jersey Department of Environmental Protection for its quality and sensitivity to the historic nature of the house.

== See also ==
- National Register of Historic Places listings in Cape May County, New Jersey
- List of the oldest buildings in New Jersey
