= Tuckahoe station (New Jersey) =

Railway station in Upper Township, the United States of America

Tuckahoe
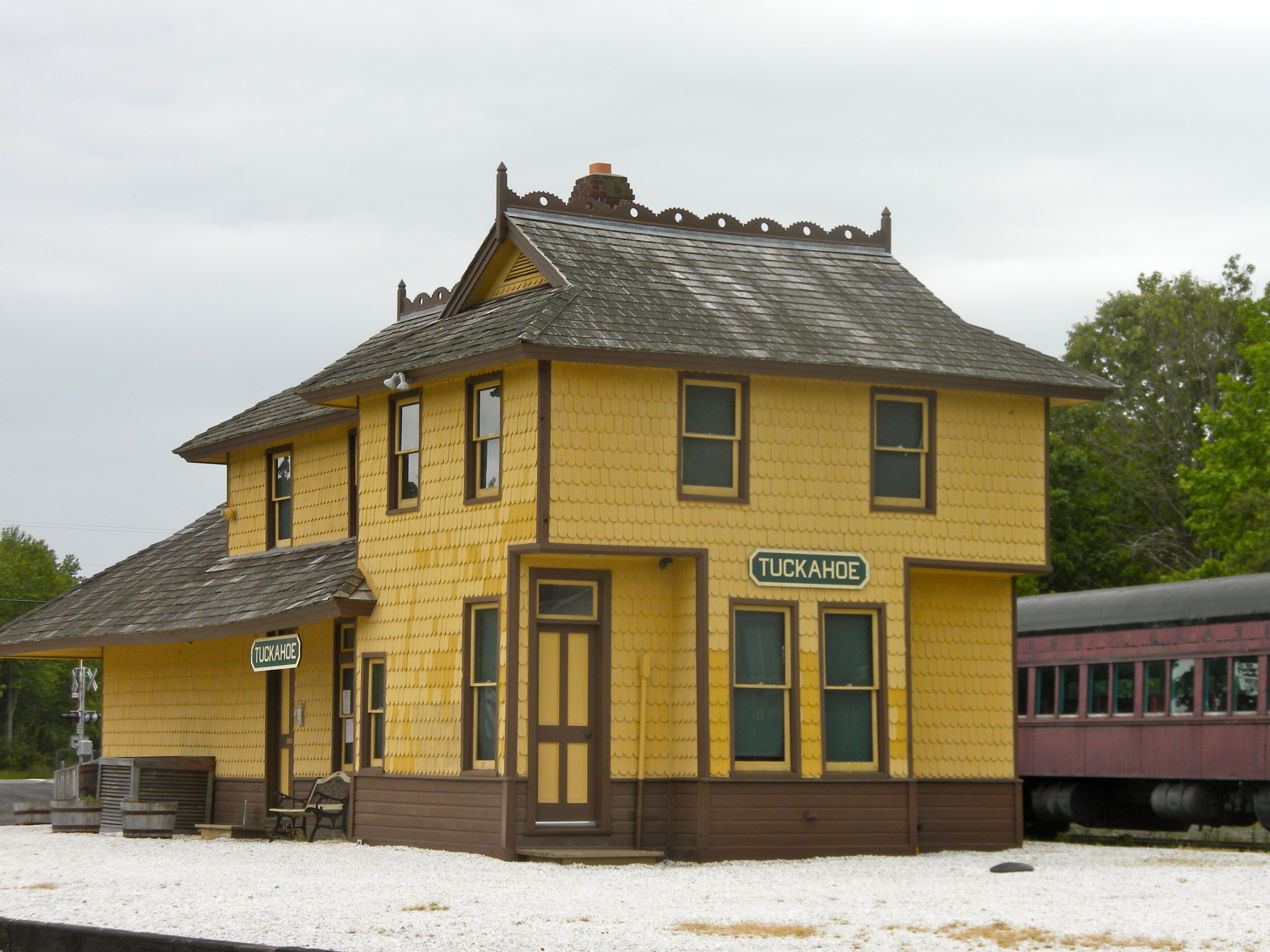

General information
- Location: Railroad Avenue, Tuckahoe, New Jersey
- Coordinates: 39°17′28″N 74°45′39″W

Services
Preceding station	Cape May Seashore Lines	Following station
Richland Terminus	Richland – Tuckahoe	Terminus

Former services
Preceding station	Pennsylvania-Reading Seashore Lines	Following station
Corbin toward Camden	ACRR Cape May Branch	Woodbine toward Cape May
Terminus	ACRR Ocean City Branch	Middletown toward Ocean City Gardens
- Tuckahoe Station
- U.S. National Register of Historic Places
- New Jersey Register of Historic Places
- Location within Cape May County, New Jersey Location within New Jersey Location within the United States
- Area: 2 acres (0.81 ha)
- Built: 1894
- Architect: Wilson Bros.
- MPS: Operating Passenger Railroad Stations TR
- NRHP reference No.: 84002626
- NJRHP No.: 1016

Significant dates
- Added to NRHP: June 22, 1984
- Designated NJRHP: March 17, 1984
Location

Tuckahoe is a disused train station located on Railroad Avenue in the Tuckahoe section of Upper Township in Cape May County, New Jersey, United States. The station was built in 1894 and was added to the National Register of Historic Places on June 22, 1984, for its significance in architecture and transportation. It is part of the Operating Passenger Railroad Stations Thematic Resource. The Cape May Seashore Lines offers excursion trips from Tuckahoe to Richland.

== See also ==
- Wilson Brothers & Company
- Operating Passenger Railroad Stations Thematic Resource (New Jersey)
- National Register of Historic Places listings in Cape May County, New Jersey
