= Joe Gatto (baseball) =

American professional baseball pitcher (born 1995)

- Pitcher
- Born: June 14, 1995 (age 29); Hammonton, New Jersey
- Bats: Right Throws: Right

Joseph John Gatto (born June 14, 1995) is an American former professional baseball pitcher.

== Amateur career ==
Gatto attended St. Augustine College Preparatory School in Richland, New Jersey, and pitched for the school's baseball team.

== Professional career ==
=== Los Angeles Angels ===
The Los Angeles Angels selected him in the second round of the 2014 MLB draft and he signed with the Angels, receiving a $1.2 million signing bonus. Gatto split his professional debut season of 2014 between the Arizona League Angels and the Orem Owlz, going a combined 2–1 with a 5.33 ERA and 16 strikeouts over 27 innings. He spent the 2015 season with Orem, going 2–3 with a 4.31 ERA and 38 strikeouts over 54 2/3 innings. Gatto spent the 2016 season with the Burlington Bees, going 3–8 with a 7.03 ERA and 54 strikeouts over 64 innings. Gatto split the 2017 season between Burlington and the Inland Empire 66ers, going a combined 8–9 with a 3.43 ERA and 101 strikeouts over 128 2/3 innings. He split the 2018 season between Inland Empire and the Mobile BayBears, going a combined 8–6 with a 5.18 ERA and 100 strikeouts over 120 innings. He spent the 2019 season with Mobile, going 5–4 with a 4.80 ERA and 57 strikeouts over 54 1/3 innings.

Gatto did not play in a game in 2020 due to the cancellation of the minor league season because of the COVID-19 pandemic. He became a free agent on November 2, 2020.

=== Texas Rangers ===
On December 3, 2020, Gatto signed a major league contract with the Texas Rangers. On March 22, 2021, Gatto was outrighted off of the 40-man roster. Gatto split the 2021 season between the Frisco RoughRiders of the Double-A Central and the Round Rock Express of the Triple-A West, going a combined 5–3 with a 3.32 ERA and 69 strikeouts over 59 2/3 innings. Gatto became a free agent following the season.

=== Philadelphia Phillies ===
On December 14, 2021, Gatto signed a minor league contract with the Philadelphia Phillies. In 28 appearances for the Triple–A Lehigh Valley IronPigs, he struggled to a 3–0 record and 6.62 ERA with 45 strikeouts across 34 innings pitched. Gatto was released by the Phillies organization on July 24, 2022.
