= Marshallville, New Jersey =

Populated place in Cape May County, New Jersey, US

- Census-designated place
- Location in Cape May County Location in New Jersey Location in the United States
- Coordinates: 39°17′47″N 74°46′5″W
- Country: United States
- State: New Jersey
- County: Cape May
- Township: Upper

Area
  - Total: 1.23 sq mi (3.19 km^{2})
  - Land: 1.20 sq mi (3.10 km^{2})
  - Water: 0.039 sq mi (0.10 km^{2})
- Elevation: 15 ft (4.6 m)

Population (2020)
  - Total: 376
  - Density: 314.3/sq mi (121.37/km^{2})
- Time zone: UTC−05:00 (Eastern (EST))
  - Summer (DST): UTC−04:00 (EDT)
- ZIP Code: 08270 (Woodbine)
- Area codes: 609/640
- FIPS code: 34-44345
- GNIS feature ID: 2806125

Marshallville is an unincorporated community and census-designated place (CDP) located in Upper Township, Cape May County, in the U.S. state of New Jersey. As of the 2020 census, Marshallville had a population of 376. It is on the northern edge of the county, bordered to the north, across the Tuckahoe River, by Corbin City in Atlantic County. It is bordered to the east by the unincorporated community of Tuckahoe.

New Jersey Route 49 runs through Marshallville, having its eastern terminus in Tuckahoe and heading northwest 17 miles (27 km) to Millville. Ocean City is 13 miles (21 km) to the east of Marshallville.

The community was first listed as a CDP prior to the 2020 census. The Marshallville Historic District is at the center of the community.

== Demographics ==
Historical population
Census	Pop.	Note	%±
2020	376		—
U.S. Decennial Census 2020

Marshallville was first listed as a census designated place in the 2020 U.S. census.

Marshallville CDP, New Jersey – Racial and ethnic composition Note: the US Census treats Hispanic/Latino as an ethnic category. This table excludes Latinos from the racial categories and assigns them to a separate category. Hispanics/Latinos may be of any race.
Race / Ethnicity (NH = Non-Hispanic)	Pop 2020	2020
White alone (NH)	339	90.16%
Black or African American alone (NH)	5	1.33%
Native American or Alaska Native alone (NH)	1	0.27%
Asian alone (NH)	2	0.53%
Native Hawaiian or Pacific Islander alone (NH)	1	0.27%
Other race alone (NH)	0	0.00%
Mixed race or Multiracial (NH)	22	5.85%
Hispanic or Latino (any race)	6	1.60%
Total	376	100.00%

As of 2020, the population was 376.
