= Blaise Vespe =

American professional basketball player

No. 15 – Nova Southeastern Sharks
- Position: Forward
- League: Atlantic Sun conference

Personal information
- Born: November 6, 2002 (age 24) Cherry Hill, New Jersey, US
- Listed height: 6 ft 7 in (2.01 m)
- Listed weight: 220 lb (100 kg)

Career information
- High school: St. Augustine Preparatory School (Richland, New Jersey); Neumann-Goretti (Philadelphia, Pennsylvania), IMG Academy (Bradenton, Florida)
- College: Florida Gulf Coast (2022–2025) Nova Southeastern University (2025-present)

Blaise Vespe (born November 6, 2002) is an American college basketball player for the Nova Southeastern Sharks of the Sunshine State Conference.

== Early life and personal life ==
Born in Cherry Hill, New Jersey, Vespe is the son of Deborah and Will Vespe. His father, Will Vespe, played at the University of Miami before getting drafted in the Major League Baseball by the Minnesota Twins and played professional ball in the Cleveland Indians organization.

As a junior at Saints Neumann Goretti High School, Vespe helped the Saints’ first Philadelphia Catholic League title since 2014. Vespe drilled a late three-pointer and secured a key blocked shot. He finished with seven points, five rebounds, one steal and two blocks. Vespe had previously transferred from St. Augustine Preparatory School in Richland, New Jersey, and after he graduated from Neumann-Goretti, he enrolled at IMG Academy in Bradenton, Florida. He averaged 20 points and 10 rebounds over his last 12 games as a senior.

== College career ==
Vespe, a 6-foot-7-inch (2.01 m) freshman forward, played a season-high 18 minutes December 10, 2022, scoring 8 points, six of which came in the first half against the Mercer Bears.

After playing two seasons with Florida Gulf Coast, Vespe did not play in the 2024-25 season because of injury. After the season, Vespe transferred to Nova Southeastern University.

=== College statistics ===
Year	Team	GP	GS	MPG	FG%	3P%	FT%	RPG	APG	SPG	BPG	PPG
2022–23	FGCU Eagles	11	0	7.2	.524	.200	.625	1.5	0.2	0.0	0.2	2.5
2023–24	FGCU Eagles	21	0	10.3	.367	.182	.643	1.3	0.1	0.3	0.0	1.6
2025–26	Nova Southeastern University	14	0	10.0	.375	.000	.760	2.5	0.3	0.4	0.2	3.9
