= Rio Grande Station =

Rio Grande Station is the name of several railroad stations including:

- Rio Grande Station (Rio Grande, New Jersey) now located in Lower Township, New Jersey
- Rio Grande Station (Salt Lake City) also known as Denver and Rio Grande Railroad Station
- Rio Grande Station (Grand Junction) also known as Denver and Rio Grande Western Railroad Depot
- Rio Grande Station (Texas)
- Rio Grande Station (El Paso Electric) also known as Rio Grande Power Station
- Rio Grande station (Chacra, Colorado)

== See also ==
- Rio Grande Depot (disambiguation)
