= John Wesley Gandy House =

Historic house in New Jersey, United States

- U.S. National Register of Historic Places
- New Jersey Register of Historic Places
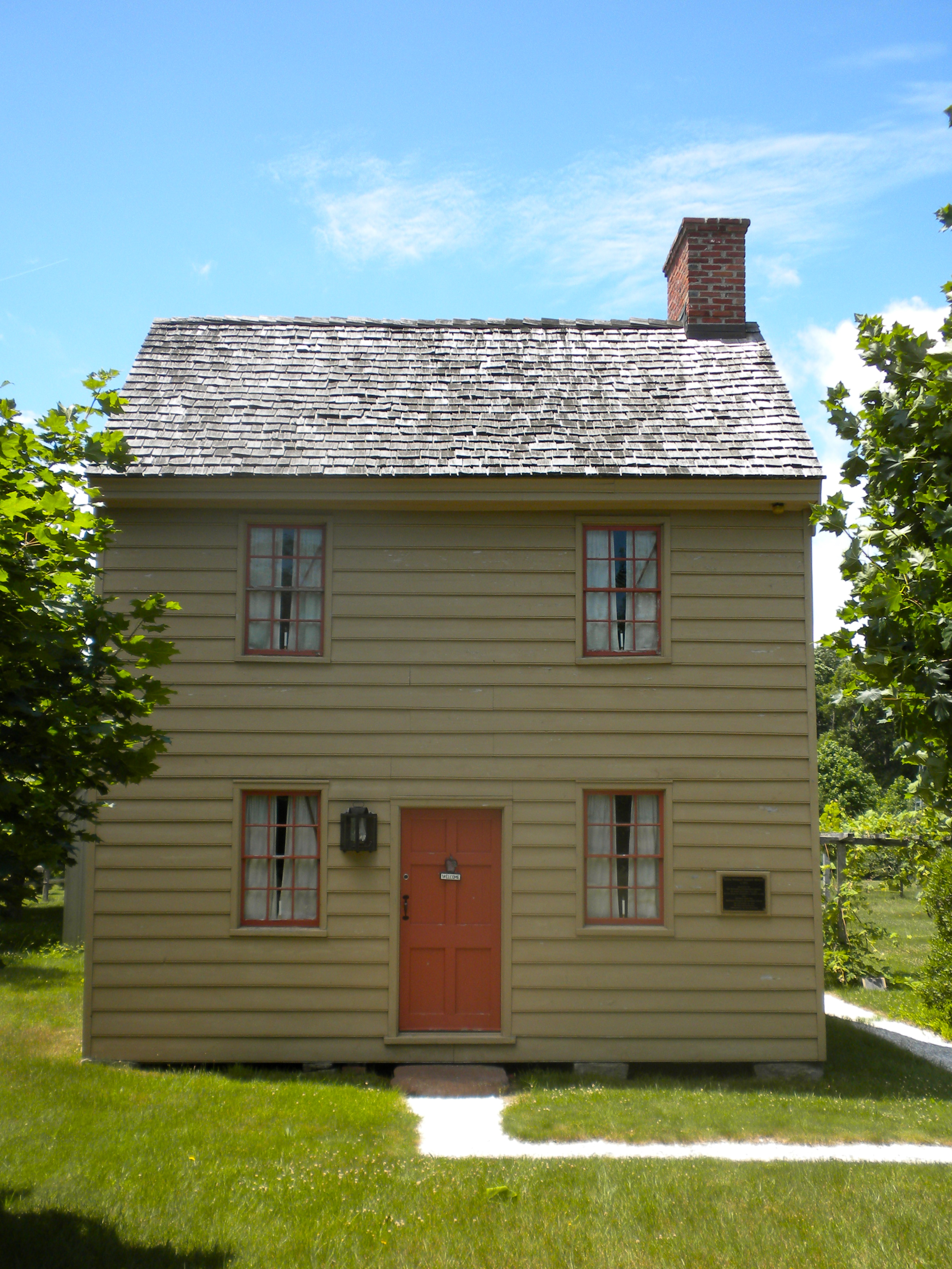
- John Wesley Gandy House in 2010.

- Location within Cape May County, New Jersey Location within New Jersey Location within the United States
- Nearest city: Upper Township, New Jersey
- Coordinates: 39°14′2″N 74°42′24″W
- Area: 1 acre (0.40 ha)
- Built: 1815
- Architectural style: Early 19th Century
- NRHP reference No.: 99001309
- NJRHP No.: 132

Significant dates
- Added to NRHP: November 12, 1999
- Designated NJRHP: July 7, 1999

John Wesley Gandy House is located in Upper Township, Cape May County, New Jersey, United States. The house was built in 1815 and was added to the National Register of Historic Places on November 12, 1999.

== See also ==
- National Register of Historic Places listings in Cape May County, New Jersey
