= Brendan McHugh =

American swimmer (born 1990)

Personal information
- Full name: Brendan Patrick McHugh
- Nickname: "The Clydesdale"
- Nationality: United States
- Born: 11 April 1990 (age 36) Sicklerville, New Jersey, U.S.
- Education: University of Pennsylvania (2012); Washington and Lee U. Law (2015)
- Occupation: Attorney
- Height: 1.96 m (6 ft 5 in)
- Weight: 97.5 kg (215 lb)

Sport
- Sport: Swimming
- Strokes: Breaststroke
- Club: Middle Atlantic Swimming; GCIT Swimming; Greater Philadelphia Aquatic Club
- College team: University of Pennsylvania
- Coach: John Stinson (St. Augustine Prep); Mike Schnur (Penn)

Brendan Patrick McHugh (born April 11, 1990) is a former American swimmer who specialized in breaststroke events. He is the former U.S. Open record holder in the 50 meters breaststroke (27.10) and the 2014 National Champion in that event. His time of 27.10 was the sixth (6th) fastest in the World for 2014. He is a two-time member of U.S.A. Swimming's National Team for the 100 meters breaststroke (2014–15, 2015–16) and represented the United States at the 2015 FINA World Championships in Kazan, Russia. Graduating Washington and Lee Law school with a J.D. in 2015, he practiced law for over a decade with Philadelphia's Drinker, Biddle, & Reath LLP.

McHugh was born April 11, 1990 in Sicklerville, New Jersey to father Patrick and mother Nancy McHugh. He grew up in the Sicklerville neighborhood of Winslow Township, New Jersey and attended St. Augustine Preparatory School, graduating around 2008, where he competed representing their strong swim club under Head Coach John Stinson by the 2007-2008 season. He led the St. Augustine Hermits to three Non-Public "A" State Championships including the years 2005, 2007, and 2008, with the team amassing a 54–1 record during McHugh's four years. McHugh also won the individual state title in the 100 breaststroke three times, as a sophomore (2006), junior (2007), and senior (2008).

== University of Pennsylvania ==
McHugh attended the University of Pennsylvania where he majored in Classics, Science and Technology, and competed on the swimming team from around 2008-2012. He graduated Magna Cum Laude from Penn in 2012, and was an All-American swimmer under the mentorship of Pennsylvania Head Coach Mike Schnur who served as Head Coach from 2000 through at least 2017. McHugh was an Ivy League champion in the 100 breaststroke as a Freshman. He set University of Pennsylvania records in the 100 breaststroke, 200 breaststroke, 100 freestyle and the 400 freestyle relay. An accomplished student, in both his Junior and Senior years at Pennsylvania, he received the honor of being named the Philadelphia Inquirer Academic All-Area Performer of the Year. By his Senior year, he held a total of 6 School records, including holding a 200 freestyle record of 1:37.31. He also swam with the Gloucester County Institute of Technology-based swimming club program (GCIT), at least by 2012 in preparation for the Olympic trials.

During the off season of his college years, and possibly into his legal career, he swam for the Greater Philadelphia Aquatic Club, and swam for Middle Atlantic Swimming at least by 2012 in preparation for the Olympics, and likely during his High School years.

== Careers ==
Graduating Law School with a J.D. degree from Washington and Lee University School of Law in 2015, where he was a member of the Omicron Delta Kappa Honor Society, he began work for Drinker, Biddle, & Reath LLP in 2016. He has remained at Drinker, Biddle and Reath for over a decade.
