= Carlton Godfrey =

American politician

Carlton Godfrey (1865–1929) was a New Jersey Republican politician and businessman who served in the New Jersey General Assembly for five years and was Speaker of the House in 1915.

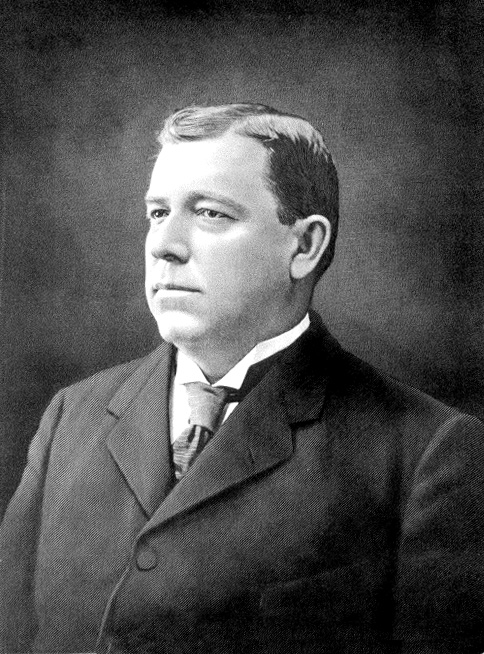
Carlton Godfrey

Godfrey was born at Beasley's Point in Upper Township, New Jersey, January 13, 1865. He was bought up on a farm, educated at public schools, and studied law after teaching school for several years. Godfrey was admitted to the bar in 1889 and practiced in Atlantic City, New Jersey. He was elected Tax Collector in 1893, a position he served for five years, and succeeded to the office of City Solicitor in 1898. As City Solicitor, he was responsible for drawing the Charter under which the city operated from 1902 until Atlantic City adopted the Commission Rule System in 1913.

In 1900, Godfrey was appointed first president of the newly organized Guarantee Trust Co., later known as the Guarantee Bank and Trust Company of Atlantic City (which was bought by First Jersey National Bank of Jersey City in 1980, subsequently by Fleet Bank of Boston in 1996, and ultimately by Bank of America in 2004). Godfrey served as president of the New Jersey Bankers' Association in 1906 and 1907. He has the distinction of being one of the very few in New Jersey who have served as Secretary of a local Building and Loan Association continuously for a period of 25 years. Additionally, he took a deep interest in school matters and was a member of the Board of Education for 12 years. Godfrey, a Republican, represented Atlantic County in the New Jersey General Assembly for three terms and was appointed Speaker of the House in 1915.

His political associates in Trenton were amazed with his astonishing capacity for work. He seemed to thrive on long, drawn-out legislative sessions and party caucuses. He never tired of them and he never complained. He worked long hours in the state house before and after state sessions, frequently forgetting to eat or sleep. In 1916, Godfrey created a political sensation by announcing that he was a candidate for the Republican gubernatorial nomination. To seek support for his candidacy, he staged a dinner at the Traymore Hotel that was attended by prominent politicians and businessmen throughout New Jersey, but the nomination eventually went to the leading contender, Walter Evans Edge, also of Atlantic County, who subsequently was elected the 36th Governor of New Jersey.

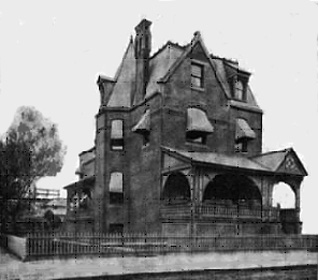
Home of Carlton Godfrey

Godfrey was known for his outstanding real estate and shore development accomplishments. He directed the movement that obtained five miles of Atlantic City ocean front for park purposes and secured the necessary legislation. His leadership is credited with building the lower beach boardwalk, creating many blocks of new beach front, and the building of the then Margate City Parkway and Somers Point-Longport boulevard. Godfrey and his wife Annie lived in Atlantic City and raised four sons, Carlton Jr., Samual, Philip, and Russell. He died on February 26, 1929, at his home in Atlantic City at the age of 64 after a long illness.
