= Upper Township, New Jersey =

Township in Cape May County, New Jersey, US

- Township
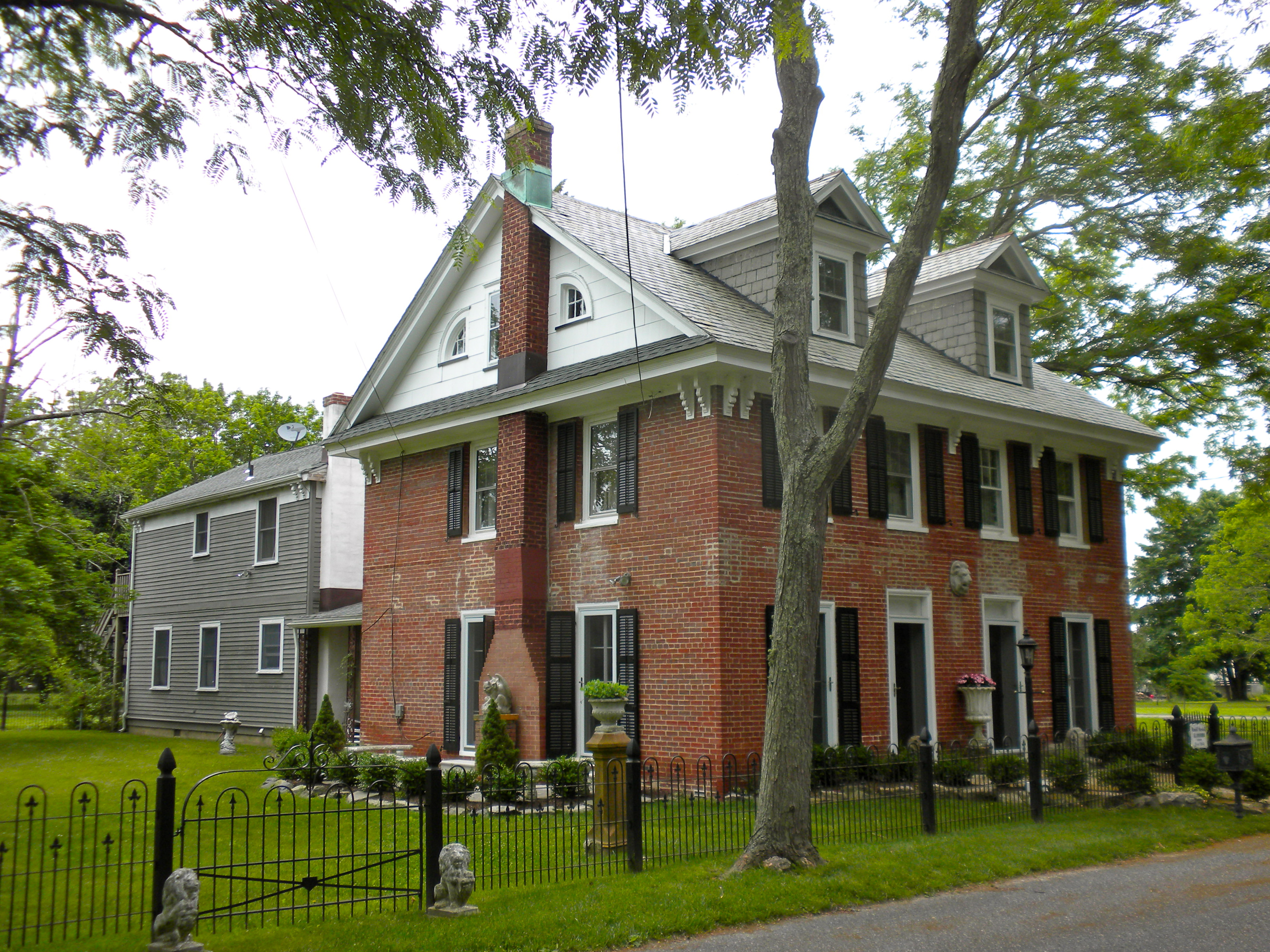
- Marshallville Inn

- Seal

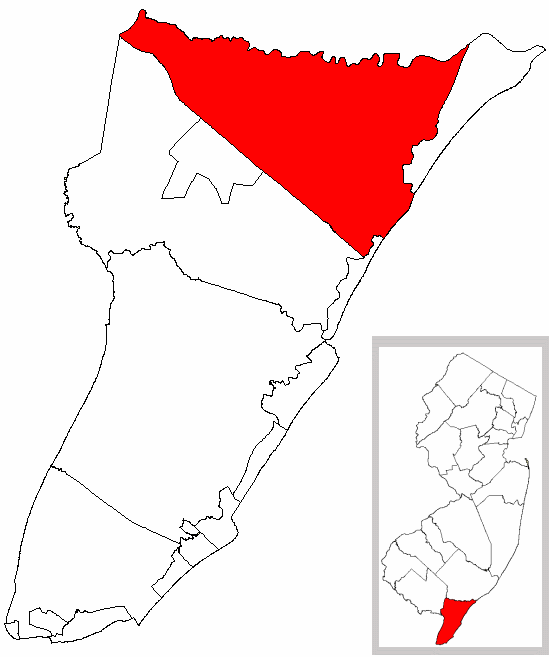
- Location of Upper Township in Cape May County highlighted in red (left). Inset map: Location of Cape May County in New Jersey highlighted in red (right).

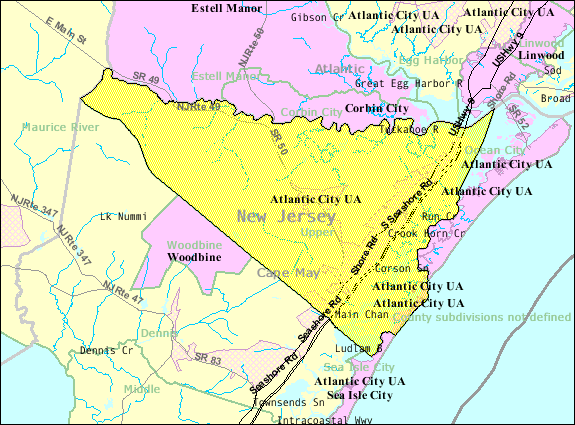
- Census Bureau map of Upper Township, New Jersey

- Location in Cape May County Location in New Jersey Location in the United States
- Coordinates: 39.258112°N 74.726912°W
- Country: United States
- State: New Jersey
- County: Cape May
- Formed: April 2, 1723
- Incorporated: February 21, 1798

Government
  - Type: Township
  - Body: Township Committee
  - Mayor: Curtis Corson (R,
  - Municipal clerk: Joanne R. Herron

Area
  - Total: 68.68 sq mi (177.89 km^{2})
  - Land: 62.03 sq mi (160.65 km^{2})
  - Water: 6.66 sq mi (17.24 km^{2}) 9.69%
  - Rank: 17th of 565 in state 2nd of 16 in county
- Elevation: 30 ft (9.1 m)

Population (2020)
  - Total: 12,539
  - Estimate (2023): 12,510
  - Rank: 205th of 565 in state 3rd of 16 in county
  - Density: 202.2/sq mi (78.1/km^{2})
  - Rank: 502nd of 565 in state 15th of 16 in county
- Time zone: UTC−05:00 (Eastern (EST))
  - Summer (DST): UTC−04:00 (Eastern (EDT))
- ZIP Codes: 08270 – Woodbine; 08230 – Ocean View; 08223 – Marmora; 08248 – Strathmere
- Area code: 609
- FIPS code: 3400974810
- GNIS feature ID: 0882047
- Website: www.uppertownship.com

Upper Township is a large township in Cape May County, in the U.S. state of New Jersey. The township, and all of Cape May County, is part of the South Jersey region of the state and of the Ocean City metropolitan statistical area, which is part of the Philadelphia-Wilmington-Camden, PA-NJ-DE-MD combined statistical area, also known as the Philadelphia metropolitan area. As of the 2020 United States census, the township's population was 12,539, an increase of 166 (+1.3%) from the 2010 census count of 12,373, which in turn reflected an increase of 258 (+2.1%) from the 12,115 counted in the 2000 census.

New Jersey Monthly magazine ranked Upper Township as its 2nd best place to live in its 2008 rankings of the "Best Places To Live" in New Jersey.

Upper Township is home to the only yellow fire trucks in Cape May County, a tradition started in 1985 when the Seaville Fire Rescue Company was purchasing a new vehicle and thought that federal regulations would require the color. Since being formed in 1964 and purchasing its first fire truck a year later, the Seaville company has served the area, responding to over 200 calls a year from its fire station is located on Route 50 across from Dino's Seaville Diner.

== History ==
Upper Township was formed as a precinct on April 2, 1723, and was incorporated as one of New Jersey's initial 104 townships by an act of the New Jersey Legislature on February 21, 1798. Portions of the township have been taken to form Dennis Township (March 1, 1827) and Ocean City borough (March 3, 1884), and territorial changes were made involving Sea Isle City in March and April 1905. The township's name came from its location when Cape May was split into three townships in 1723 at the same time that Lower Township and Middle Township were created.

During 2008, Upper Township was considering consolidation with neighboring Corbin City. Corbin City already shares extensively with Upper Township for municipal service, but the question of consolidating municipalities across county borders presented an obstacle to a full merger.

== Geography ==
According to the United States Census Bureau, the township had a total area of 68.68 square miles (177.89 km^{2}), including 62.03 square miles (160.65 km^{2}) of land and 6.66 square miles (17.24 km^{2}) of water (9.69%).

Beesley's Point (2020 population of 816), Marmora (2,413), Marshallville (376), Palermo (3,183), Seaville (695), Strathmere (137), and Tuckahoe (357) are unincorporated communities and census-designated places (CDP) located within Upper Township.

Other unincorporated communities, localities and place names located partially or completely within the township include Blackmans Island, Cedar Springs, Corsons Inlet, Formosa, Greenfield, Middletown, Miramar, Petersburg, Steelmantown, West Ocean City and Whale Beach. The township contains many different communities and enclaves that create a diverse area reaching from Great Egg Harbor to the Atlantic Ocean. Seaville is the largest community and Strathmere is the township's island containing a beach community.

The township borders the municipalities of Dennis Township, Ocean City, Sea Isle City and Woodbine in Cape May County; Corbin City, Egg Harbor Township, Estell Manor and Somers Point in Atlantic County; and Maurice River Township in Cumberland County.

== Demographics ==
Historical population
Census	Pop.	Note	%±
1810	1,664		—
1820	2,107		26.6%
1830	1,067	*	−49.4%
1840	1,217		14.1%
1850	1,341		10.2%
1860	1,552		15.7%
1870	1,483		−4.4%
1880	1,702		14.8%
1890	1,381	*	−18.9%
1900	1,351		−2.2%
1910	1,483		9.8%
1920	1,272		−14.2%
1930	1,657		30.3%
1940	1,675		1.1%
1950	1,922		14.7%
1960	2,539		32.1%
1970	3,413		34.4%
1980	6,713		96.7%
1990	10,681		59.1%
2000	12,115		13.4%
2010	12,373		2.1%
2020	12,539		1.3%
2023 (est.)	12,510		−0.2%
Population sources:1810–2000 1810–1920 1840 1850–1870; 1850 1870 1880–1890; 1890–1910 1910–1930; 1940–2000 2000; 2010 2020 * = Lost territory in previous decade.

=== 2010 census ===
The 2010 United States census counted 12,373 people, 4,566 households, and 3,461 families in the township. The population density was 199.1 per square mile (76.9/km^{2}). There were 6,341 housing units at an average density of 102.0 per square mile (39.4/km^{2}). The racial makeup was 96.61% (11,954) White, 0.58% (72) Black or African American, 0.13% (16) Native American, 0.74% (92) Asian, 0.01% (1) Pacific Islander, 0.72% (89) from other races, and 1.20% (149) from two or more races. Hispanic or Latino of any race were 2.36% (292) of the population.

Of the 4,566 households, 32.6% had children under the age of 18; 62.2% were married couples living together; 9.7% had a female householder with no husband present and 24.2% were non-families. Of all households, 20.1% were made up of individuals and 9.4% had someone living alone who was 65 years of age or older. The average household size was 2.71 and the average family size was 3.14.

23.8% of the population were under the age of 18, 7.7% from 18 to 24, 20.2% from 25 to 44, 34.0% from 45 to 64, and 14.3% who were 65 years of age or older. The median age was 43.6 years. For every 100 females, the population had 94.4 males. For every 100 females ages 18 and older there were 92.1 males.

The Census Bureau's 2006-2010 American Community Survey showed that (in 2010 inflation-adjusted dollars) median household income was $81,250 (with a margin of error of +/− $8,629) and the median family income was $97,372 (+/− $6,832). Males had a median income of $63,597 (+/− $2,442) versus $46,250 (+/− $4,552) for females. The per capita income for the borough was $38,702 (+/− $2,243). About 2.5% of families and 4.0% of the population were below the poverty line, including 2.9% of those under age 18 and 6.6% of those age 65 or over.

=== 2000 census ===
As of the 2000 United States census there were 12,115 people, 4,266 households, and 3,365 families residing in the township. The population density was 191.8 inhabitants per square mile (74.1/km^{2}). There were 5,472 housing units at an average density of 86.6 per square mile (33.4/km^{2}). The racial makeup of the township was 97.59% White, 0.69% African American, 0.12% Native American, 0.61% Asian, 0.06% Pacific Islander, 0.19% from other races, and 0.74% from two or more races. Hispanic or Latino of any race were 1.28% of the population.

There were 4,266 households, out of which 39.5% had children under the age of 18 living with them, 67.7% were married couples living together, 8.5% had a female householder with no husband present, and 21.1% were non-families. 17.4% of all households were made up of individuals, and 8.3% had someone living alone who was 65 years of age or older. The average household size was 2.84 and the average family size was 3.23.

In the township the population was spread out, with 28.6% under the age of 18, 6.0% from 18 to 24, 27.7% from 25 to 44, 25.5% from 45 to 64, and 12.2% who were 65 years of age or older. The median age was 38 years. For every 100 females, there were 93.0 males. For every 100 females age 18 and over, there were 89.4 males.

The median income for a household in the township was $60,942, and the median income for a family was $68,824. Males had a median income of $46,528 versus $31,325 for females. The per capita income for the township was $27,498. About 2.4% of families and 3.5% of the population were below the poverty line, including 3.1% of those under age 18 and 3.8% of those age 65 or over.

== Parks and recreation ==
With its beaches in the Strathmere section, Upper Township is one of five municipalities in the state that offer free public access to oceanfront beaches monitored by lifeguards, joining Atlantic City, North Wildwood, Wildwood and Wildwood Crest.

== Government ==
=== Local government ===
Upper Township is governed under the Township form of New Jersey municipal government, one of 141 municipalities (of the 564) statewide that use this form, the second-most commonly used form of government in the state. The Township Committee is comprised of five members, who are elected directly by the voters at-large in partisan elections to serve three-year terms of office on a staggered basis, with either one or two seats coming up for election each year as part of the November general election in a three-year cycle. At an annual reorganization meeting, the Township Committee selects one of its members to serve as Mayor.

As of 2023, members of the Upper Township Committee are Mayor John C. "Jay" Newman (R, term on committee ends December 31, 2024; term as mayor ends 2023), Deputy Mayor Kimberly R. Hayes (R, term on committee ends 2024; term as deputy mayor ends 2023), Curtis T. Corson Jr. (R, 2023), Victor W. Nappen II (R, 2025) and Mark E. Pancoast (R, 2025).

After Hobie Young resigned from office from a seat expiring in December 2022, Kim Hayes was appointed to fill the vacancy. In the November 2021 general election, Hayes ran for a full three-year term, while Mark Pancoast ran for the balance of Young's term of office, with both winning their election bids.

=== Federal, state and county representation ===
Upper Township is located in the 2nd Congressional District and is part of New Jersey's 1st state legislative district.

For the 119th United States Congress, New Jersey's 2nd congressional district is represented by Jeff Van Drew (R, Dennis Township). New Jersey is represented in the United States Senate by Democrats Cory Booker (Newark, term ends 2027) and Andy Kim (Moorestown, term ends 2031).

For the 2026–2027 session, the 1st legislative district of the New Jersey Legislature is represented in the State Senate by Mike Testa (R, Vineland) and in the General Assembly by Antwan McClellan (R, Ocean City) and Erik K. Simonsen (R, Lower Township).

Cape May County is governed by a five-person Board of County Commissioners whose members are elected at-large on a partisan basis to three-year terms of office on a staggered basis, with either one or two seats coming up for election each year; At an annual reorganization held each January, the commissioners select one member to serve as director and another to serve as vice-director. As of 2026, Cape May County's Commissioners are Director Leonard C. Desiderio (R, Sea Isle City, term as commissioner ends December 31, 2027; term as director ends 2026), Vice-Director Andrew Bulakowski (R, Lower Township; term as commissioner ends 2028; term as vice-director ends 2026). Robert Barr (R, Ocean City; 2028) and Will Morey (R, Wildwood Crest; 2026), with one seat expiring in December 2026 vacant after Melanie Collette resigned from office in March 2026. The county's constitutional officers are Clerk Rita Marie Rothberg (R, Ocean City; 2030), Sheriff Robert Nolan (R, Lower Township; 2026) and Surrogate E. Marie Hayes (R, Ocean City; 2028).

=== Politics ===
As of March 2011, there were a total of 9,154 registered voters in Upper Township, of which 1,403 (15.3%) were registered as Democrats, 4,454 (48.7%) were registered as Republicans and 3,287 (35.9%) were registered as Unaffiliated. There were 10 voters registered as Libertarians or Greens.

Gubernatorial election results for Upper Township
Year	Republican		Democratic		Third party(ies)	
Year	No.	%	No.	%	No.	%
2025	3,975	59.63%	2,663	39.95%	28	0.42%
2021	3,811	64.29%	2,079	35.07%	38	0.64%
2017	2,360	64.71%	1,195	32.77%	92	2.52%
2013	3,396	70.21%	1,364	28.20%	77	1.59%
2009	2,865	58.49%	1,655	33.79%	378	7.72%
2005	2,468	57.09%	1,661	38.42%	194	4.49%

In the 2012 presidential election, Republican Mitt Romney received 58.2% of the vote (4,027 cast), ahead of Democrat Barack Obama with 40.5% (2,807 votes), and other candidates with 1.3% (89 votes), among the 6,998 ballots cast by the township's 9,487 registered voters (75 ballots were spoiled), for a turnout of 73.8%. In the 2008 presidential election, Republican John McCain received 57.2% of the vote (4,165 cast), ahead of Democrat Barack Obama, who received 40.9% (2,980 votes), with 7,286 ballots cast among the township's 9,053 registered voters, for a turnout of 80.5%. In the 2004 presidential election, Republican George W. Bush received 61.1% of the vote (4,391 ballots cast), outpolling Democrat John Kerry, who received around 37.6% (2,701 votes), with 7,192 ballots cast among the township's 8,988 registered voters, for a turnout percentage of 80.0.

Presidential elections results
Year	Republican	Democratic
2024	60.4% 4,968	38.0% 3,127
2020	58.8% 4,998	39.7% 3,376
2016	59.4% 4,270	35.4% 2,544
2012	58.2% 4,027	40.5% 2,807
2008	57.2% 4,165	40.9% 2,980
2004	61.1% 4,391	37.6% 2,701

In the 2013 gubernatorial election, Republican Chris Christie received 70.2% of the vote (3,396 cast), ahead of Democrat Barbara Buono with 28.2% (1,364 votes), and other candidates with 1.6% (77 votes), among the 4,974 ballots cast by the township's 9,433 registered voters (137 ballots were spoiled), for a turnout of 52.7%. In the 2009 gubernatorial election, Republican Chris Christie received 57.8% of the vote (2,865 ballots cast), ahead of both Democrat Jon Corzine with 33.4% (1,655 votes) and Independent Chris Daggett with 6.3% (312 votes), with 4,954 ballots cast among the township's 9,341 registered voters, yielding a 53.0% turnout.

United States Senate election results for Upper Township1
Year	Republican		Democratic		Third party(ies)	
Year	No.	%	No.	%	No.	%
2024	4,775	61.19%	2,943	37.71%	86	1.10%
2018	3,682	62.50%	2,032	34.49%	177	3.00%
2012	3,518	56.88%	2,528	40.87%	139	2.25%
2006	2,833	60.35%	1,761	37.52%	100	2.13%

United States Senate election results for Upper Township2
Year	Republican		Democratic		Third party(ies)	
Year	No.	%	No.	%	No.	%
2020	4,798	58.76%	3,262	39.95%	106	1.30%
2014	2,480	63.74%	1,358	34.90%	53	1.36%
2013	1,593	64.68%	843	34.23%	27	1.10%
2008	3,809	58.02%	2,629	40.05%	127	1.93%

== Education ==
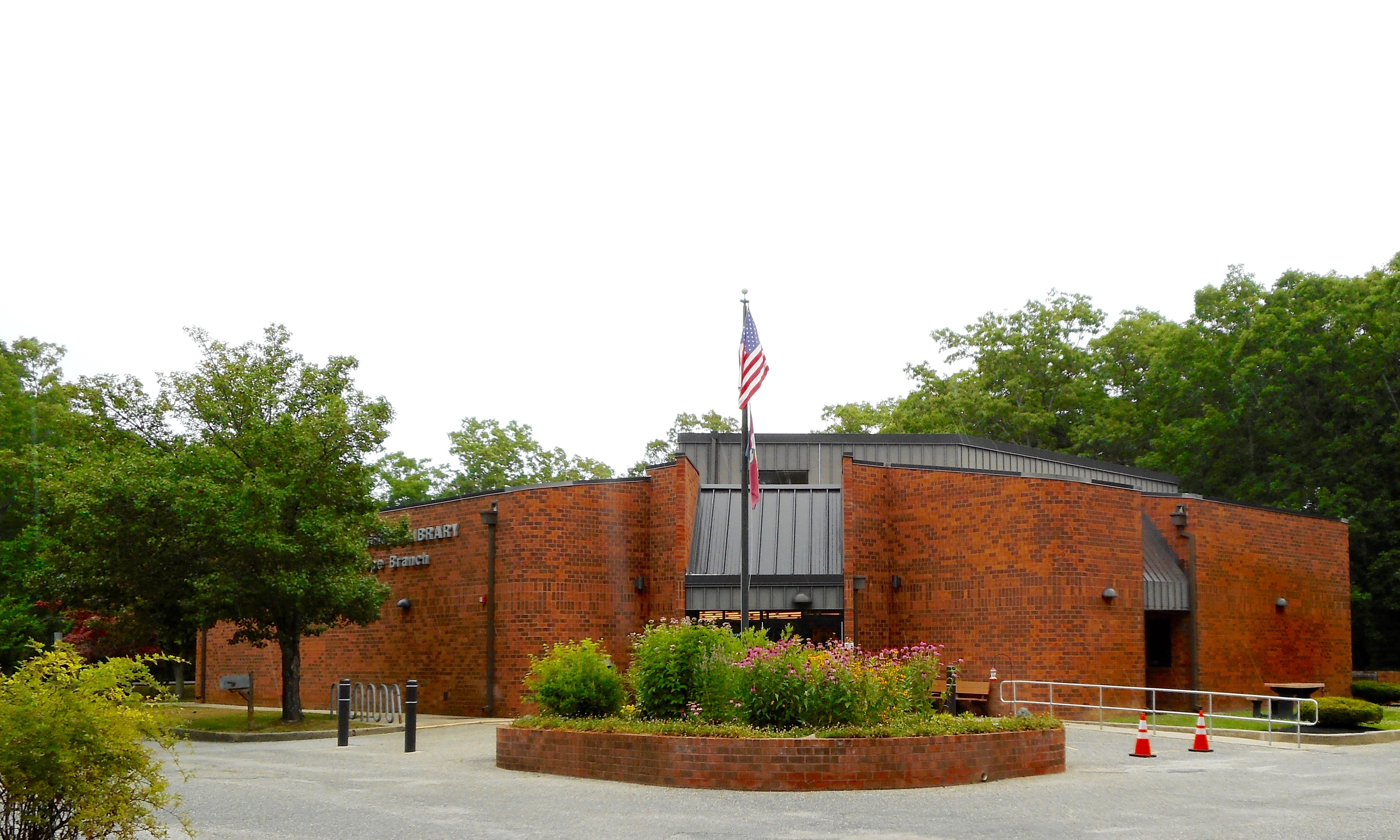
Upper Township Branch of the Cape May County Library, in Petersburg

The Upper Township School District serves students in pre-kindergarten through eighth grade. Students from Corbin City, a non-operating district, attend the district's schools as part of a sending/receiving relationship. As of the 2023–24 school year, the district, comprised of three schools, had an enrollment of 1,378 students and 117.9 classroom teachers (on an FTE basis), for a student–teacher ratio of 11.7:1. Schools in the district (with 2023–24 enrollment data from the National Center for Education Statistics) are Upper Township Primary School with 479 students in grades PreK-2, Upper Township Elementary School with 448 students in grades 3–5 and Upper Township Middle School with 442 students in grades 6–8.

Students in public school for ninth through twelfth grades from Upper Township attend Ocean City High School in Ocean City as part of a sending/receiving relationship with the Ocean City School District, along with students from Corbin City, Longport and Sea Isle City. As of the 2023–24 school year, the high school had an enrollment of 1,190 students and 126.4 classroom teachers (on an FTE basis), for a student–teacher ratio of 9.4:1. About 60% of students in Ocean City High School have been from Upper Township.

Countywide schools include Cape May County Technical High School (for technical school students) and Cape May County Special Services School District (for special needs students) in Cape May Court House.

The Roman Catholic Diocese of Camden operates Bishop McHugh Regional School, a Catholic K-8 school, in Dennis Township, which has a Cape May Courthouse postal address. The Press of Atlantic City describes it as being in Ocean View, though it lies outside of the Ocean View CDP. It is the parish school of Marmora/Woodbine Catholic Church and three other churches.

Cape May County Library operates the Upper Township Branch in Petersburg.

== Police Department ==
Upper Township does not maintain its own municipal police department. The township is served by the New Jersey State Police who respond from their barracks in neighboring Woodbine.

== Transportation ==
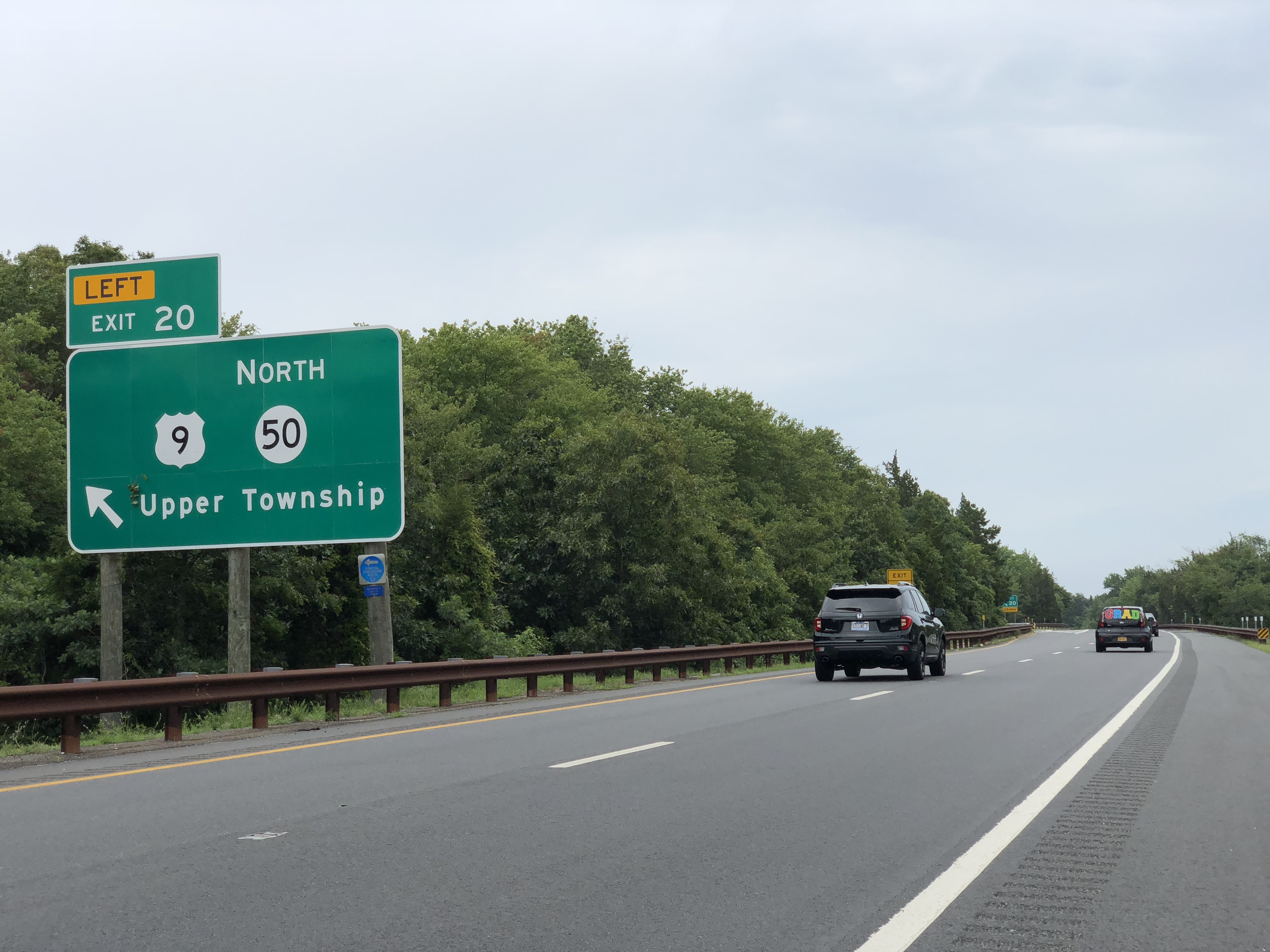
Garden State Parkway northbound at exit 20 for U.S. Route 9 and Route 50 in Upper Township

=== Roads and highways ===
As of May 2010, the township had a total of 140.23 miles (225.68 km) of roadways, of which 74.84 miles (120.44 km) were maintained by the municipality, 36.95 miles (59.47 km) by Cape May County and 19.37 miles (31.17 km) by the New Jersey Department of Transportation and 9.07 miles (14.60 km) by the New Jersey Turnpike Authority.

The Garden State Parkway and US 9 pass through the town and has two exits that provide access to Route 50 and U.S. Route 9, and they both cross over the Great Egg Harbor Bridge, since the Beesley's Point Bridge is closed. The Parkway connects Dennis Township on the south to Egg Harbor Township in the north. at Interchange 20 for Seaville / Tuckahoe and Interchange 25 for Ocean City / Marmora via County Route 623.

Other major roads that pass through include Route 49, CR 548 and CR 557.

=== Public transportation ===
NJ Transit offers the 313 and 315 (and the 316 offering seasonal service) inter-city bus routes that runs through the town three times a day and shuttle people between Cape May and Philadelphia, the 319 route between Cape May and the Port Authority Bus Terminal in Midtown Manhattan, and the 552 route between Cape May and Atlantic City.

== Points of interest ==
- Tuckahoe station
- Marshallville Historic District
- Thomas Beesley Sr. House
- John Wesley Gandy House

== Notable people ==
People who were born in, residents of, or otherwise closely associated with Upper Township include:

- George Gandy (1851–1946), business executive and developer, best known for constructing the original Gandy Bridge, the first bridge to span the Tampa Bay in Florida
- Garet Garrett (1878–1954), journalist and author, noted for his opposition to the New Deal and U.S. involvement in World War II
- Carlton Godfrey (1865–1929), politician and businessman who served in the New Jersey General Assembly for five years and was Speaker of the House in 1915
- Ford Palmer (born 1990), professional middle-distance runner who specializes in the 1500 meters and the mile
- Bob Pellegrini (1934–2008), linebacker who played in the National Football League for the Philadelphia Eagles and the Washington Redskins
- Dummy Stephenson (1869–1924), outfielder in Major League Baseball who played for the Philadelphia Phillies in 1892
- Adam Williamson (born 1984), professional soccer midfielder who has played for the Ocean City Barons in the USL Premier Development League
