= St. Augustine Preparatory School =

Private high school in Atlantic County, New Jersey, US

Location
- 611 Cedar Avenue; Buena Vista Township, Atlantic County, New Jersey 08350; United States; 39°30′0″N 74°52′23″W

Information
- Type: Private, All-Male
- Motto: Veritas ∙ Unitas ∙ Caritas (Truth ∙ Unity ∙ Love)
- Religious affiliations: Roman Catholic; Order of Saint Augustine
- Patron saint: St. Augustine of Hippo
- Established: 1959
- Founder: Franklin P. Cucinotta
- Oversight: Roman Catholic Diocese of Camden
- NCES School ID: 00864402
- Head of school: Robert J. Murray
- Faculty: 47.6 FTEs
- Grades: 8–12
- Enrollment: 622 (as of 2023–24)
- Student to teacher ratio: 13.1:1
- Campus: suburban/rural
- Campus size: 118 acres (0.48 km^{2})
- Campus type: Wooded, rural
- Colors: Blue and white
- Slogan: Enter as Boys to Learn; Exit as Men to Serve
- Song: Saint Augustine Alma Mater
- Athletics: 22 inter-scholastic sports
- Athletics conference: Cape-Atlantic League (general); West Jersey Football League (football)
- Mascot: The Hermit
- Team name: Hermits
- Accreditation: Middle States Association of Colleges and Schools and New Jersey Association of Independent Schools
- Newspaper: Prep News and The Torch
- Yearbook: Austin-Aire
- Tuition: $21,986 (grades 9-12 for 2024-25); $12,954 (grade 8 for 2024-25)
- Affiliation: Order of Saint Augustine Province of Saint Thomas of Villanova
- Website: www.hermits.com

St. Augustine Preparatory School is a private all-male Catholic college preparatory school located in the Richland section of Buena Vista Township, in Atlantic County, in the U.S. state of New Jersey. Located on 118 acres (0.48 km^{2}) of wooded property, it serves students in eighth through twelfth grade from across South Jersey under the auspices of the Diocese of Camden.

The school has been accredited by the Middle States Association of Colleges and Schools Commission on Elementary and Secondary Schools since 1983 and the New Jersey Association of Independent Schools. St. Augustine was founded in 1959 by the Order of Saint Augustine as a minor seminary to help young men prepare for studies in the priesthood and religious life; the first class was a mixture of seminarians and day students. The school is a member of the Augustinian Secondary Education Association.

The school added an eighth grade in the 2021-22 school year.

As of the 2023–24 school year, the school had an enrollment of 622 students and 47.6 classroom teachers (on an FTE basis), for a student–teacher ratio of 13.1:1. The school's student body was 80.7% (502) White, 6.1% (38) Black, 5.5% (34) Hispanic, 5.1% (32) two or more races, 1.9% (12) Asian, 0.5% (3) American Indian / Alaska Native and 0.2% (1) Native Hawaiian / Pacific Islander.

The school's graduating class of 2024 was offered over $55 million in scholarships.

== History ==
Established in September 1959, the school's first senior class of 12 students graduated in 1963. The school's first Headmaster was Fr. Peter Toscani, OSA. Classes were first held in the Monastery, which was previously an estate named "Red Oaks". The first school building, Augustinian Hall, consisted of four classrooms and a gymnasium, which opened in 1960. The first expansion included the western wing of Augustinian Hall in 1967–68. The Spina Gymnasium was constructed in 1979-80 and the former gym was converted into classrooms and a chapel. The enrollment ranged between 150 and 210 students for many years.

The third expansion of facilities was the construction of the Edith Favretto Scarpa Arts and Sciences Building in 1998. The building houses most of the campus' computer labs, the media center, the library, and additional classrooms. Following that expansion, enrollment grew from 235 to 550. A minor renovation replaced the chapel with additional classrooms in 2000. The most recent addition to the school is The Louis and Josephine Buondonno Forum, or simply, "The Forum". Following the construction of the new building, enrollment increased to 650 students. In the Forum are the Rodio Gymnasium, the Consalo Dining hall, The Navone Swimming Pool, weight room, wrestling room, and additional classrooms.

In October 2014, the Prep dedicated the Navone Athletic Training Facility. The 5,000-square-foot (460 m^{2}) facility includes cross fit equipment, a batting cage, and a weight room. It is named in honor of its benefactor Paul Navone.

In June 2011, longtime school President Fr. Paul Galetto was replaced by Donald F. Reilly, previously Prior Provincial of the Villanova province of the Augustinian Order, and previous chairman of the school's board of directors. The school announced in November 2016 that Robert J. Murray was designated to become the school's new president at the end of the 2016–2017 school year.

== Campus ==
The school's campus consists of seven buildings set over 118 acres (0.48 km^{2}) of wooded property. The principal educational facilities are Augustinian Hall, The Louis & Josephine Buondonno Forum; Edith Favretto Scarpa Arts & Sciences Building; Vincent L. Buondonno Center; Greek Amphitheater; LaRosa Field; Turf Field; and the Navone Athletic Training Facility.

Athletic fields include 5 tennis courts; a lacrosse field; 2 practice football/mixed use fields; and 2 baseball fields.

== Patron saint ==
The school is named in honor of the 4th century saint, St. Augustine of Hippo, one of a few Augustinian friar schools in the United States and others throughout the world with this same patron saint. The North American foundation of the order dates back to 1796.

== Student body ==
In addition to Atlantic County, students reside in Burlington, Camden, Cape May, Cumberland. Gloucester, Ocean, and Salem counties.

== Athletics ==
The Saint Augustine Prep Hermits compete in the National Division of the Cape-Atlantic League, an athletic conference comprised of public and private high schools in Atlantic, Cape May, Cumberland, and Gloucester counties that operates under the aegis of the New Jersey State Interscholastic Athletic Association (NJSIAA). With 976 students in grades 10-12, the school was classified by the NJSIAA for the 2019–20 school year as Non-Public, Group A for most athletic competition purposes, which included schools with an enrollment of 381 to 1,454 students in that grade range (equivalent to South, Group 3 for public schools). The football team competes in the American Division of the 94-team West Jersey Football League superconference and was classified by the NJSIAA as Non-Public Group A (equivalent to Group III/IV/V for public schools) for football for 2024–2026, which included schools with 738 to 1,404 students.

School colors are navy blue and white. The school offers 22 inter-scholastic sports programs, including: football, soccer, cross country, basketball, swimming, ice hockey, wrestling, winter/spring track and field, chess, baseball, golf, tennis, crew, lacrosse, volleyball, fencing, bowling, sailing, squash, surfing, and rugby. St. Augustine teams have recently competed in state championships for baseball, hockey, tennis, basketball, golf, swimming, soccer, wrestling, lacrosse, and crew.

The boys' cross country team won the Non-Public Group C state championship in 1974 (as co-champion) and 1976-1978.

The basketball team has won five state titles in school history: Non-Public B in 1982 (vs. Bayley-Ellard High School) and 1999 (St. Patrick High School), and Non-Public A in 2004 (vs. Seton Hall Preparatory School), 2011 (vs. Seton Hall) and 2016 (vs. Don Bosco Preparatory High School). The team won the 2001 Parochial South B sectional championship defeating McCorristin Catholic High School by 65–49 in the tournament final. The basketball team won the 2002 Parochial South A, defeating Camden Catholic High School 50–45. The team won again in 2004 with a 56–48 win over Camden Catholic High School. In 2010–11, the basketball team won their fourth Non-Public A championship by defeating Seton Hall Prep 71–60. In the 2015–16 season, the team won their fifth Non-Public A championship by defeating Don Bosco Preparatory High School by a score of 83–50 in the tournament final. Paul Rodio, a member of the class of 1970, earned his 776th victory in February 2013 as St. Augustine Prep's head basketball coach, making him the winningest coach in South Jersey history and won his 1,000th game in January 2023, his 46th season coaching the team, joining Bob Hurley as one of the two New Jersey high school coaches to reach that win mark.

The wrestling team won the Parochial B South sectional championship in 1983–1986, 2001, 2003, 2004, 2010, 2014–2017, 2019 and 2020, and won the Parochial B state championship in 1984, 1985, 2001 and 2003. The wrestling team won Non-Public B state titles in 2001 and 2003 over Gloucester Catholic High School and St. Mary's High School of East Rutherford respectively. The 2001 title was the team's first since 1985. In 2014, 2015, 2016, 2017 and 2018, the Hermits won the South Jersey Non-Public A sectional title.

The boys soccer team won the Non-Public B state championship in 1991 (defeating Pingry School in the tournament final) and 1992 (vs. Delbarton School), and won the Non-Public A title in 2003 (as co-champion with Delbarton), 2005 (vs. Seton Hall Preparatory School), 2010 (vs. Pingry). The soccer team was declared state champion in the 2003 NJSIAA Parochial A Boys' Soccer State Tournament jointly with Delbarton School. The team was the Non-Public A Champion in the 2005 Boys Soccer Non-Public Finals, defeating Seton Hall Preparatory School 4–1. The soccer team finished the season with a record and 25-1 and won the Non-Public A championship in 2010 with a 2–0 win over Pingry School, marking the program's fifth state title and their first since their 2005 win.

The football team, which was established in 1989 and finished the 1992 season at 1-8, won the Non-Public Group I state championship in 1995 with a 30-8 victory against St. Mary High School in the championship game, to finish the season with a record of 9-2.

The tennis team won the Non-Public, South A title in 2003 over Monsignor Donovan High School 4–1. The team won the Non-Public, South A title again in 2005 and 2006, defeating Christian Brothers Academy 5-0 and 4–1, respectively. In 2007, the tennis team finished the year 10th on The Star-Ledger's top 20 list having won the Non-Public A State title in a come-from-behind 3–2 victory over Delbarton School, winning their first state title after having been swept 5-0 by Delbarton in both of their previous state title games.

The swimming team has won 10 Non-Public state titles: the Non-Public B title in 2004, the Non-Public A championship in 2005, 2007-2009, 2017, and 2023, and the Non-Public State Title from 2024-2026. The swim team was the 4th-ranked swim team in the nation in 2005. They won the 06-07 Non-Public A state title with a 105–65 win against St. Joseph High School and the 07-08 Non-Public A state title with a 109–61 victory over Seton Hall Preparatory School. The team won the 2017 Non-Public A championship, the program's sixth state title, with an 89–81 victory over a Christian Brothers Academy team that had won the Non-Public A title the seven previous years. From 2023-2026, the team won four consecutive state titles for the first time. They defeated Christian Brothers Academy, 91-79 in 2023, Bergen Catholic High School 95-75 in February 2024, The Pingry School 121-49 in 2025, and Delbarton School 100-70 in 2026.

The crew team's Lightweight 8+ won both the Stotesbury Cup Regatta and the Scholastic Rowing Association of America Regatta (commonly referred to as the "Scholastic Nationals") in the 2006 spring season, marking the first national title achieved by St. Augustine Prep. In the 2012 spring season, the Junior Varsity 8+ won the Scholastic Nationals.

The ice hockey team won the Non-Public state championship in 2007, 2023 and 2024, won the Handchen Cup in 2006 and 2007, and won the Gordon Cup in 2011 (as co-champion). The team claimed the 2006-07 Non-Public state championship, defeating St. Peter's Preparatory School by a score of 3–1 on March 23, 2007, as the first South Jersey school to win the state title in hockey finishing the season with a 23-0-0 record and becoming the first ice hockey team in New Jersey history to go undefeated and untied. In the 2022-23 season, St. Augustine Prep captured the Non-Public state championship by defeating Delbarton School 3–2 in overtime in March 2023, with the game-winning goal scored just 11 seconds into overtime. The following season, the team repeated as Non-Public state champions with a 10–6 victory over Don Bosco Preparatory High School in March 2024, setting the record as the highest-scoring state final in New Jersey high school hockey history.

The boys tennis team won the Non-Public Group A state championship in 2007, defeating runner-up Delbarton School in the final match of the tournament.

They boys lacrosse team won the Non-Public Group A state championship in 2022, the program's first, defeating runner-up Delbarton School by a score of 6–5 in the final game of the tournament.

The baseball team won the Non-Public A state championship in 2011 (defeating Pope John XXIII Regional High School in the tournament finals), 2018 (vs. Delbarton School) and 2024 (vs. Delbarton). The 2018 team finished the season with a 26-4 record after defeating Delbarton School by a score of 1-0 in the Non-Public A playoff finals. The Hermits won the South Jersey Non-Public A sectional title in 2019.

== Notable alumni ==
- John F. Amodeo (born 1950), politician who served in the New Jersey General Assembly, where he represented the 2nd Legislative District from 2008 to 2014
- Olu Babalola (born 1981, class of 2001), professional basketball player for Sheffield Sharks in Britain
- Mike Catalana (born c. 1963, class of 1981), sports director of WHAM-TV in Rochester, New York
- Jack Crawford (born 1988, class of 2008), former professional football player who played as a defensive end in the NFL for the Oakland Raiders, Dallas Cowboys, Atlanta Falcons, Tennessee Titans and Arizona Cardinals
- Shereef Elnahal (born 1985), physician who has served as 21st Commissioner of the New Jersey Department of Health
- Sam Fiocchi (born 1952, class of 1970), politician who represented the 1st Legislative District in the New Jersey General Assembly from 2014 to 2016
- Joe Gatto (born 1995), former professional baseball pitcher
- Chris Gheysens (born 1971, class of 1989), chief executive officer of Wawa Inc
- Franklin Gómez (born 1986), freestyle wrestler
- William Gormley (born 1946, class of 1964), former member of the New Jersey General Assembly and New Jersey Senate, who represented the 2nd Legislative District
- Daniel J. Hilferty (born 1956, class of 1974), Chairman and Chief Executive Officer of Comcast Spectacor and Governor of the Philadelphia Flyers
- Austin Johnson (born 1994, class of 2012), professional football player for the Tennessee Titans
- Brendan McHugh (born 1990, class of 2008), swimmer who specializes in the breaststroke
- Pops Mensah-Bonsu (born 1983, class of 2002), basketball executive, who had played in the NBA for the Dallas Mavericks, Houston Rockets, Toronto Raptors, Washington Wizards and New Orleans Pelicans
- Sa'eed Nelson (born 1998), professional basketball player for Antranik of the Lebanese Basketball League
- Myron Rolle (born 1986), former NFL safety
- Drew Sullivan (born 1980, class of 1999), retired professional basketball player who represented Great Britain at the 2012 Summer Olympics
- Kanye Udoh, college football running back for the Liberty University Flames
- Blaise Vespe (born 2002), college basketball player for the Florida Gulf Coast Eagles men's basketball team
