= Marshallville Historic District =

Historic district in New Jersey, United States

- U.S. National Register of Historic Places
- U.S. Historic district
- New Jersey Register of Historic Places
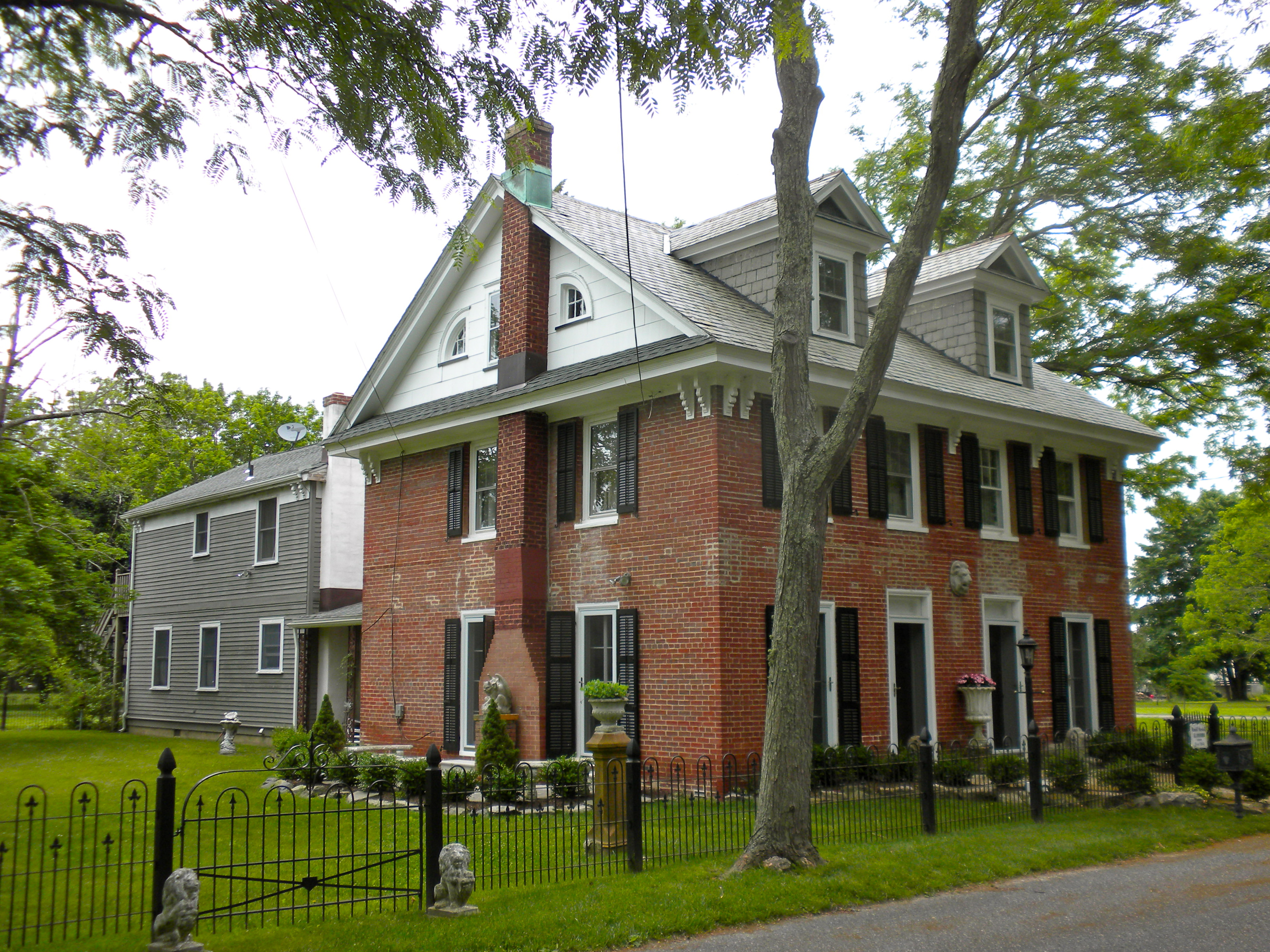

- Location within Cape May County, New Jersey Location within New Jersey Location within the United States
- Location: Roughly Marshallville Road at County Route 557, Upper Township, New Jersey
- Coordinates: 39°17′54″N 74°46′35″W
- Area: 85 acres (34 ha)
- Built: 1814
- Architectural style: Federal
- NRHP reference No.: 89002013
- NJRHP No.: 1015

Significant dates
- Added to NRHP: November 28, 1989
- Designated NJRHP: August 14, 1989

Marshallville Historic District is located in Marshallville, Upper Township, Cape May County, New Jersey, United States. The district was added to the National Register of Historic Places on November 28, 1989.

== See also ==
- National Register of Historic Places listings in Cape May County, New Jersey
