= Cape May Seashore Lines =

Short line railroad in southern New Jersery, U.S.

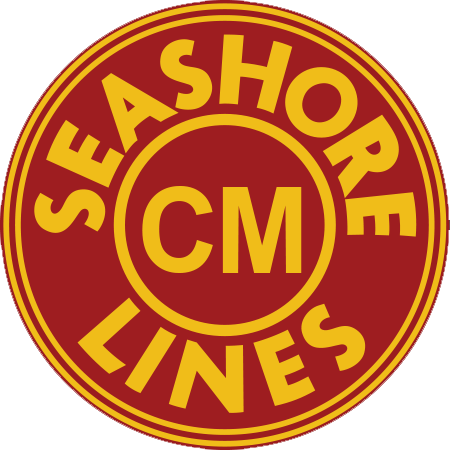

Overview
- Headquarters: Tuckahoe, New Jersey
- Reporting mark: CMSL
- Locale: Cape May County and Atlantic County, New Jersey
- Dates of operation: 1984–present
- Predecessor: Pennsylvania-Reading Seashore Lines

Technical
- Track gauge: 4 ft 8 1/2 in (1,435 mm) standard gauge
- Length: 27 miles (43 km)

Other
- Website: seashorelines.org

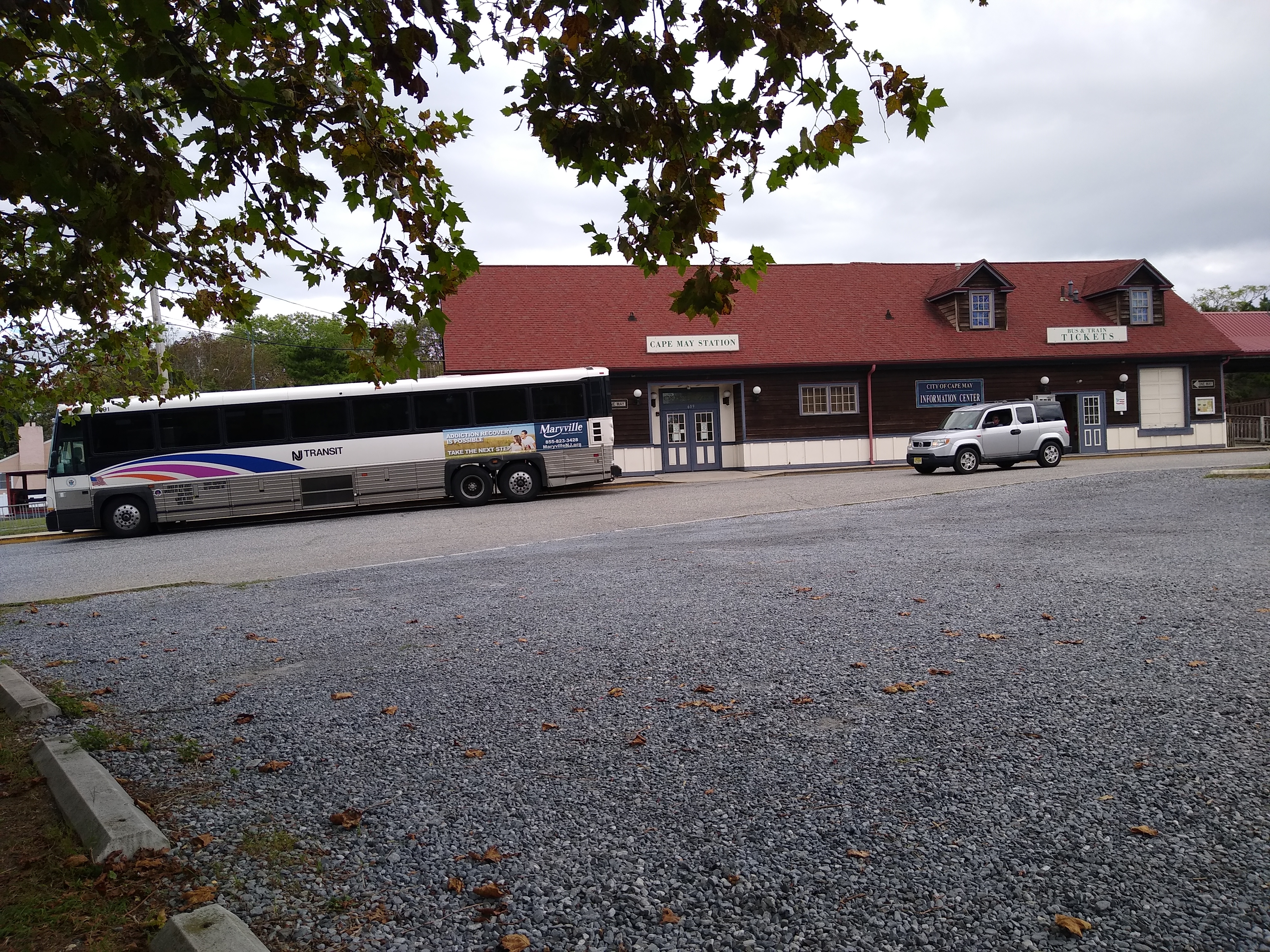
Cape May Station and Welcome Center (bus station and former train station)

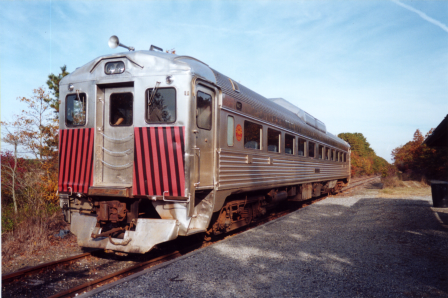
Seashore Lines Budd Car no. M-407

Cape May Seashore Lines (reporting mark CMSL) is a short line railroad in southern New Jersey that operates both freight trains and excursion trains. It offers two excursion services: a 30-mile (48 km) round trip between Richland and Tuckahoe along the Beesley's Point Secondary railroad line and a 14-mile (23 km) round trip between Rio Grande, Cold Spring , and Cape May along the Cape May Branch (service between Rio Grande and Cape May is suspended due to theft of track material and damage along the Cape May Branch). The track is owned by NJ Transit and leased to the Seashore Lines. The Cape May Branch is the original line operated by the Cape May Seashore Lines and runs from Cape May north to Tuckahoe, connecting to the Beesley's Point Secondary in Tuckahoe. Cape May Seashore Lines operates freight service along the Beesley's Point Secondary line between Winslow and Palermo, interchanging with Conrail Shared Assets Operations in Winslow. Tony Macrie has been president of the Seashore Lines since he formed the railroad in 1984.

== History ==
The Cape May rail line was constructed in 1863 by the Tuckahoe & Cape May Railroad and was operated by the Philadelphia & Reading Railway's Atlantic City Railroad, later becoming part of the Pennsylvania-Reading Seashore Lines (PRSL). Known as "The Steel Speedway to the Shore," it eventually became part of Conrail (CR), which ceased passenger service in 1981 and freight service on October 10, 1983. The line was subsequently sold to New Jersey Transit as their Cape May Branch.

Cape May Seashore Lines (CMSL) was established by CEO Tony Macrie in January 1984. Regular train service between Cape May Court House and Cold Spring Village began in 1996 and extended to Cape May City in 1999 following the repair of the swing bridge over the Cape May Canal. In 2005, mechanical issues with the swing bridge halted trains from entering Cape May City. Although the bridge was repaired in 2006, an April 2007 storm damaged the tracks, leaving locomotives stranded in Tuckahoe. Passenger service between Rio Grande and Cape May City resumed on October 12, 2009. In 2020, CMSL partnered with railbiking company Revolution Rail offering excursions over approximately two miles of trackage between Cape May station and the swing bridge over Cape May Canal.

CMSL currently operates excursion trains on 15 miles of the former Beesley's Point Secondary between Tuckahoe and Richland, and 5 miles of the Cape May Branch between Tuckahoe and Woodbine. The current passenger train operations include themed services such as the Valentine’s Express, Easter Bunny Express, and Santa Express. Trainsets primarily consist of the railroad's two GP38 diesel locomotives and several passenger cars. CMSL also offers excursions for community and corporate events.

In November 2021, CMSL filed with the Surface Transportation Board to operate freight rail service on the Beesley's Point Secondary Track between Winslow and Palermo, approximately 30 miles long. Service commenced in February 2022.

In March 2025, filming was conducted in Milmay and Tuckahoe for the then-untitled Steven Spielberg film Disclosure Day using Seashore Lines locomotives, passenger cars and freight cars.

During 2025 and 2026, CMSL work crews began repairs to several of the vandalized areas of trackage.

On October 19, 2025, CMSL operated two lite locomotives to Woodbine to support the annual Woodbine Car Show. On July 4, 2026, CMSL operated a passenger train movement to Woodbine for the first time since September 2010, to commemorate Woodbine's America250 celebration. CMSL locomotives also supported events in Woodbine on October 10, 2026.

=== 2012 vandalism ===
On March 1, 2012, CMSL was informed by the New Jersey State Police of track material theft on their Cape May Branch in Dennisville. This main line connects Tuckahoe to Cape May City. Several individuals involved in the theft were arrested and charged. On March 5, a father and son from the Villas area of Lower Township, New Jersey, along with an individual from Rio Grande, were apprehended.

A subsequent inspection by Macrie and CMSL employees revealed the theft encompassed approximately 6,800 feet (1 1/4 miles) of track, affecting 75 percent of the tie plates and spikes in that section and damaging numerous cross ties. Due to the vandalism, excursion trains did not operate in summer 2012. However, CMSL offered rides on railroad speeder vehicles along undamaged tracks of the Cape May Branch. As of 2026, Rio Grande–Cape May service remains suspended.

During 2025 and 2026, CMSL work crews began repairs to several of the vandalized areas of trackage. On July 4, 2026, CMSL operated a passenger train movement to Woodbine for the first time since January 2010, to commemorate Woodbine's America250 celebration. CMSL locomotives also supported events in Woodbine on October 10, 2026.

=== 2024 track rehabilitation project ===
In early 2024, CMSL released a statement that it was beginning a track rehabilitation project on the former Beesley's Point Secondary Track between Winslow and Richland. According to the release, over 5,000 new crossties were installed between Winslow and Richland. The project also allowed for the complete rehabilitation of the one-mile long Milmay Passing Siding. Additional rehabilitation work was completed in the Tuckahoe Yard Area.

=== New Jersey Seashore Lines ===
New Jersey Seashore Lines (NJSL) is a subsidiary of CMSL, established in collaboration with Clayton Sand Company in Chatsworth, New Jersey. Utilizing state and federal grants, NJSL rehabilitated a 13-mile section of track between Lakehurst and Woodmansie in Woodland Township, where Clayton operates a sand mine. The line was initially intended to transport sand and gravel and serve other customers along the route. Originally owned by the Central Railroad of New Jersey, the line was part of the historic Blue Comet route. South of Woodmansie, the tracks are dormant, with no connection to the south. Neither CMSL, NJSL, nor Clayton Sand Company have provided information regarding current or future plans for the line or its operational status.

== Lines ==
- Richland–Tuckahoe
- Rio Grande–Cape May

== Roster ==
The Seashore Lines owns a large roster of equipment:

- Four EMD GP38's: Numbers 2000, 2014, 2015 and 2661. Nos. 2000, 2014 and 2661 are former Pennsylvania - Reading Seashore Lines locomotives. Unit 2000 restored to PRSL livery in 2023.
- Eight of the 12 former Pennsylvania - Reading Seashore Lines Budd Rail Diesel Cars (RDC) diesel multiple units.
- Restored Pullman / Atchison, Topeka and Santa Fe Railway (ATSF) 'Super Chief' lounge/observation car Vista Valley.
- Restored Pullman / Chicago, Burlington and Quincy (CB&Q) 'California Zephyr' sleeper-lounge car Silver Isle.
- Three Comet I Class commuter coaches, including Cab Control Car no. 5119.
- Four cabooses, including the last two remaining PRSL cabooses.
- An ALCO RS-3m, formerly PRR 8481.
- Central Railroad of New Jersey (CNJ) observation car, "Tempel", used on the Blue Comet.
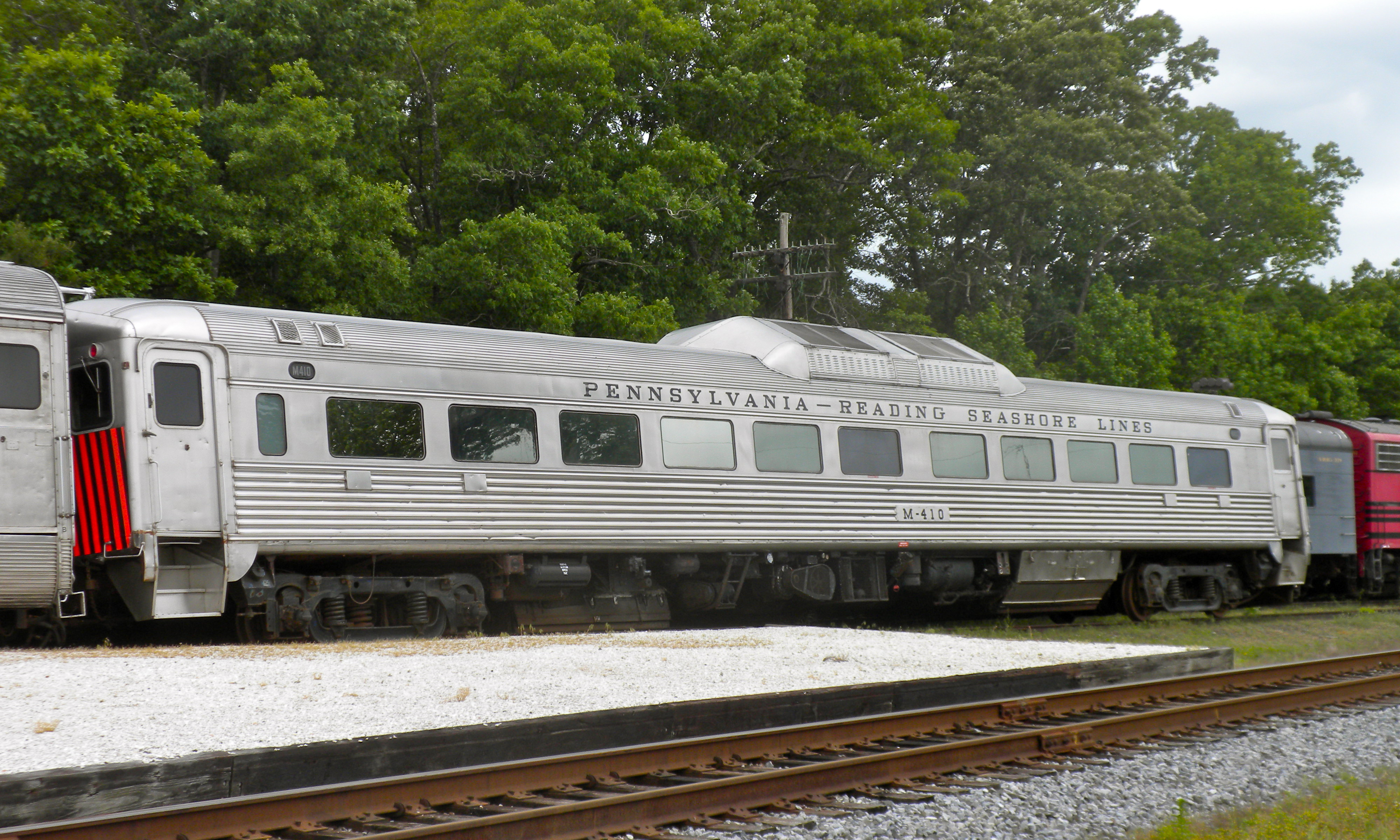
Seashore Lines Budd Car M-410

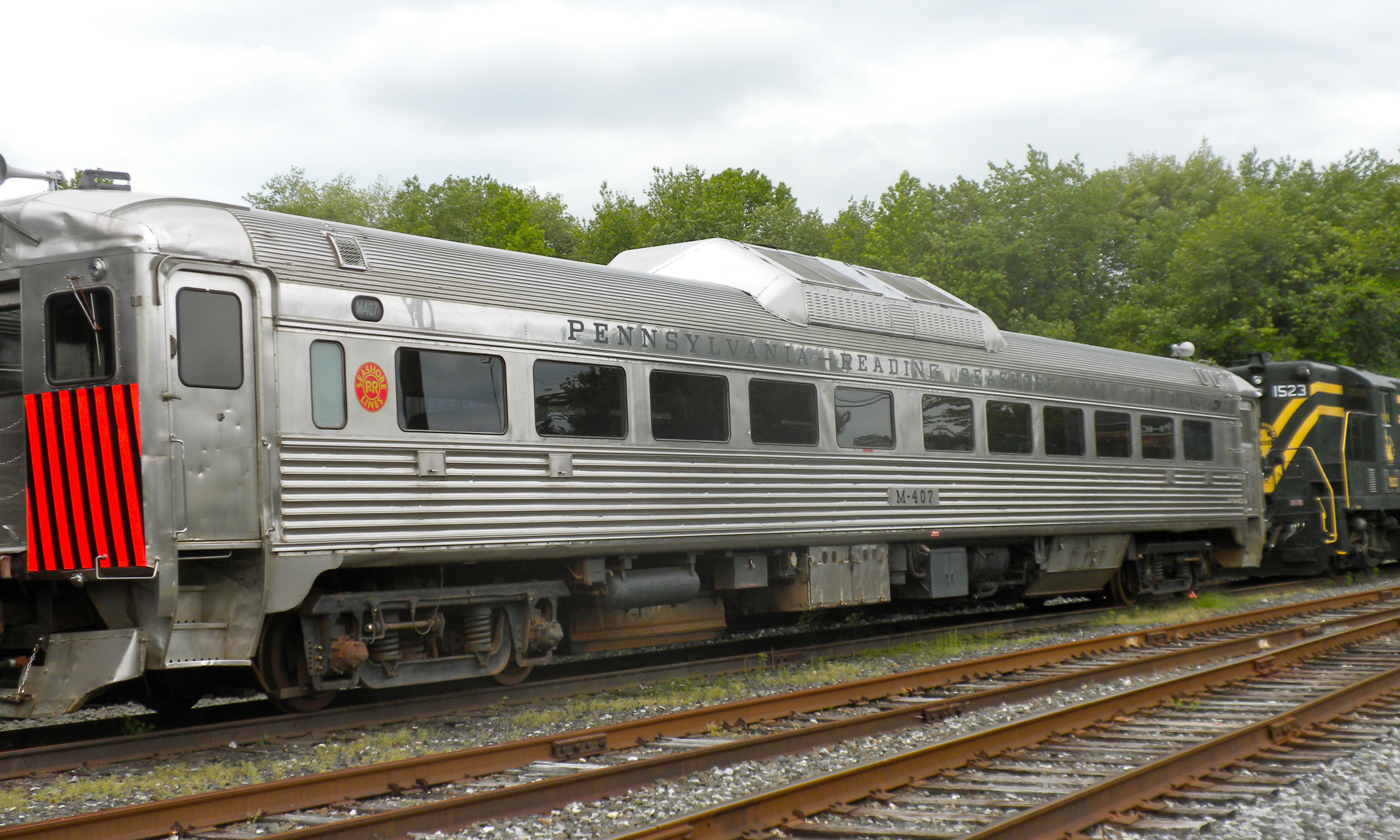
Seashore Lines Budd Car M-407

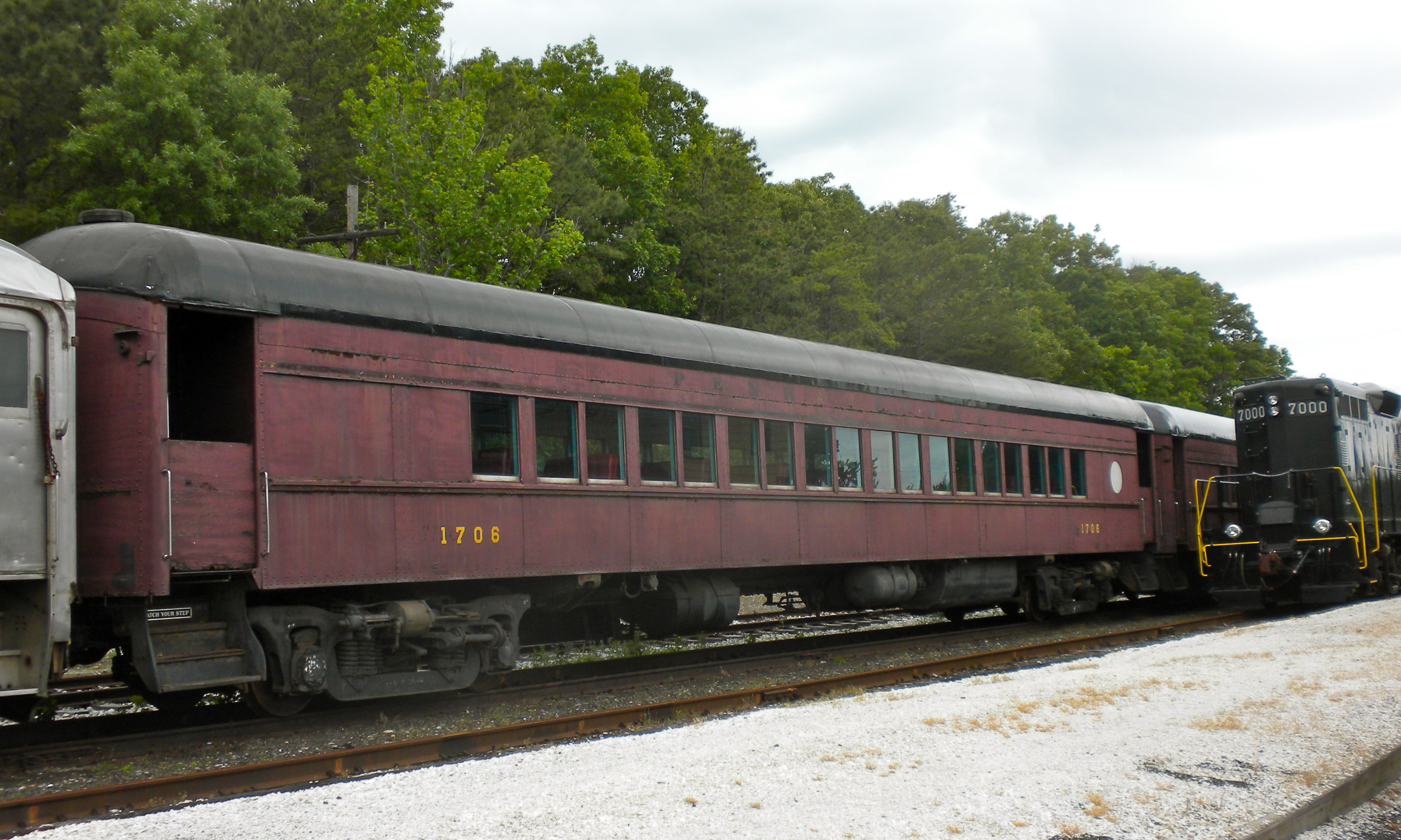
PRR P-70 passenger car

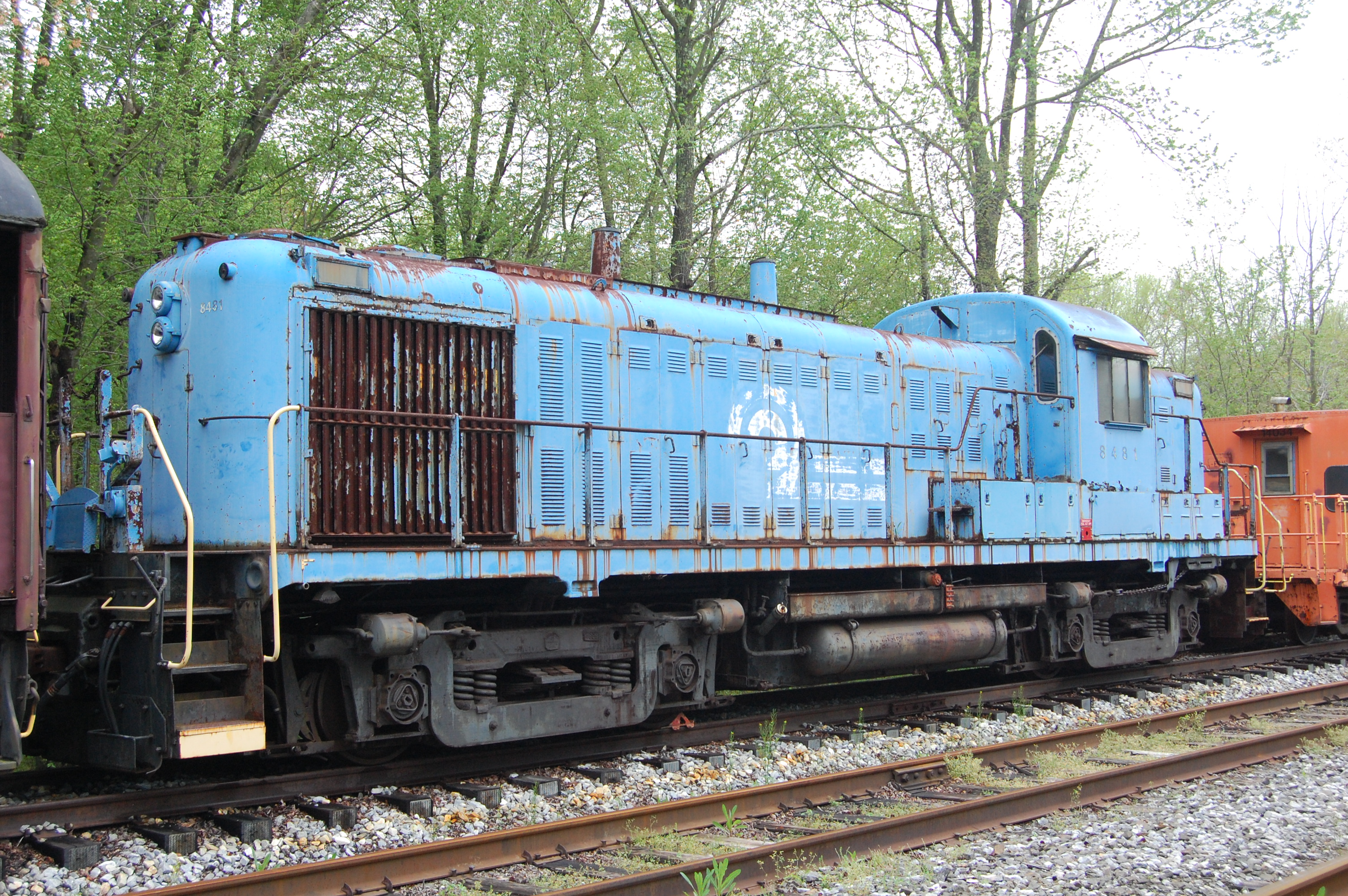
Former Conrail RS3m

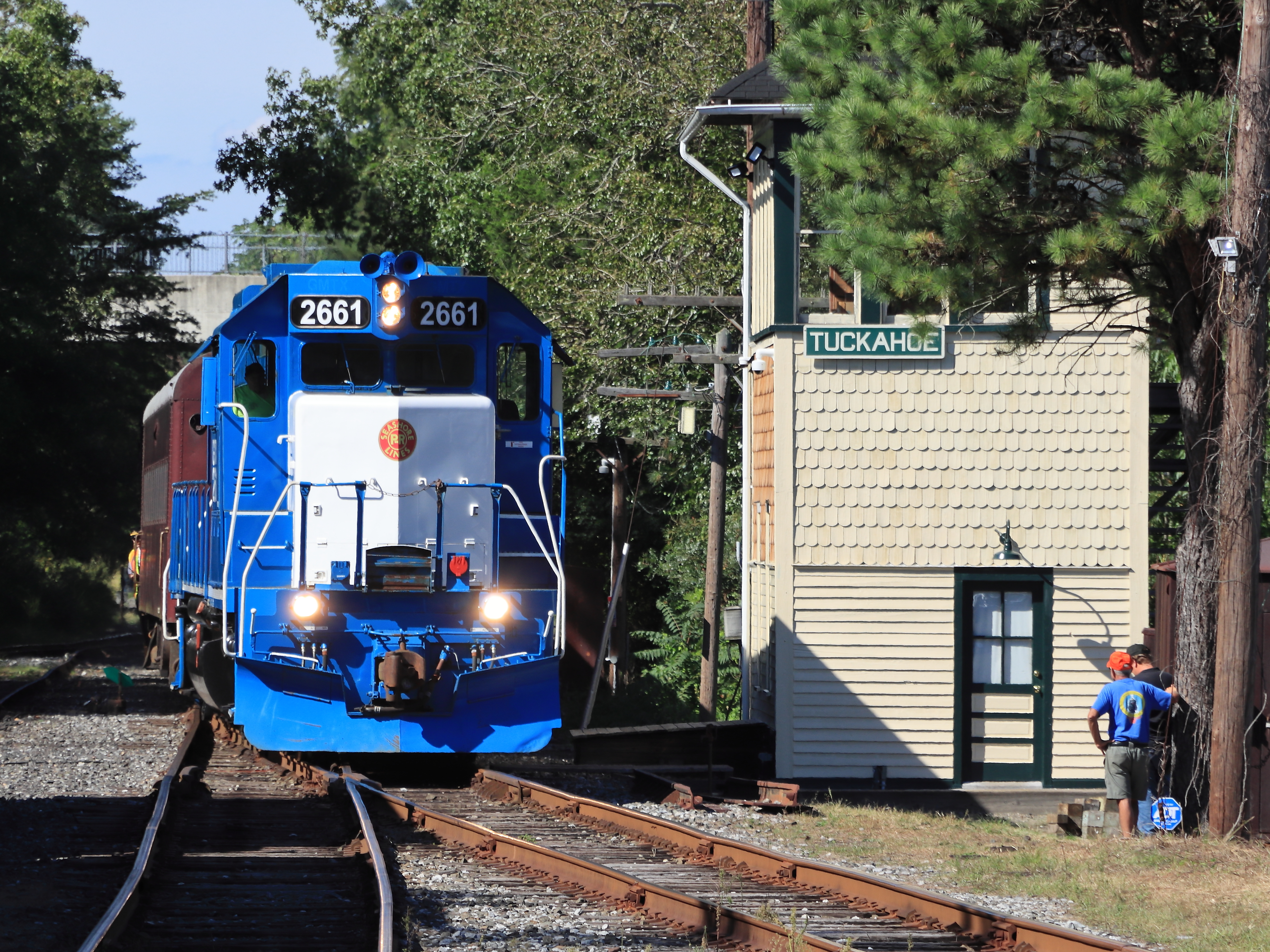
GP38 locomotive 2661

== See also ==
- List of New Jersey railroads
