= Rio Grande station (New Jersey) =

Railway station in New Jersey, United States

Rio Grande
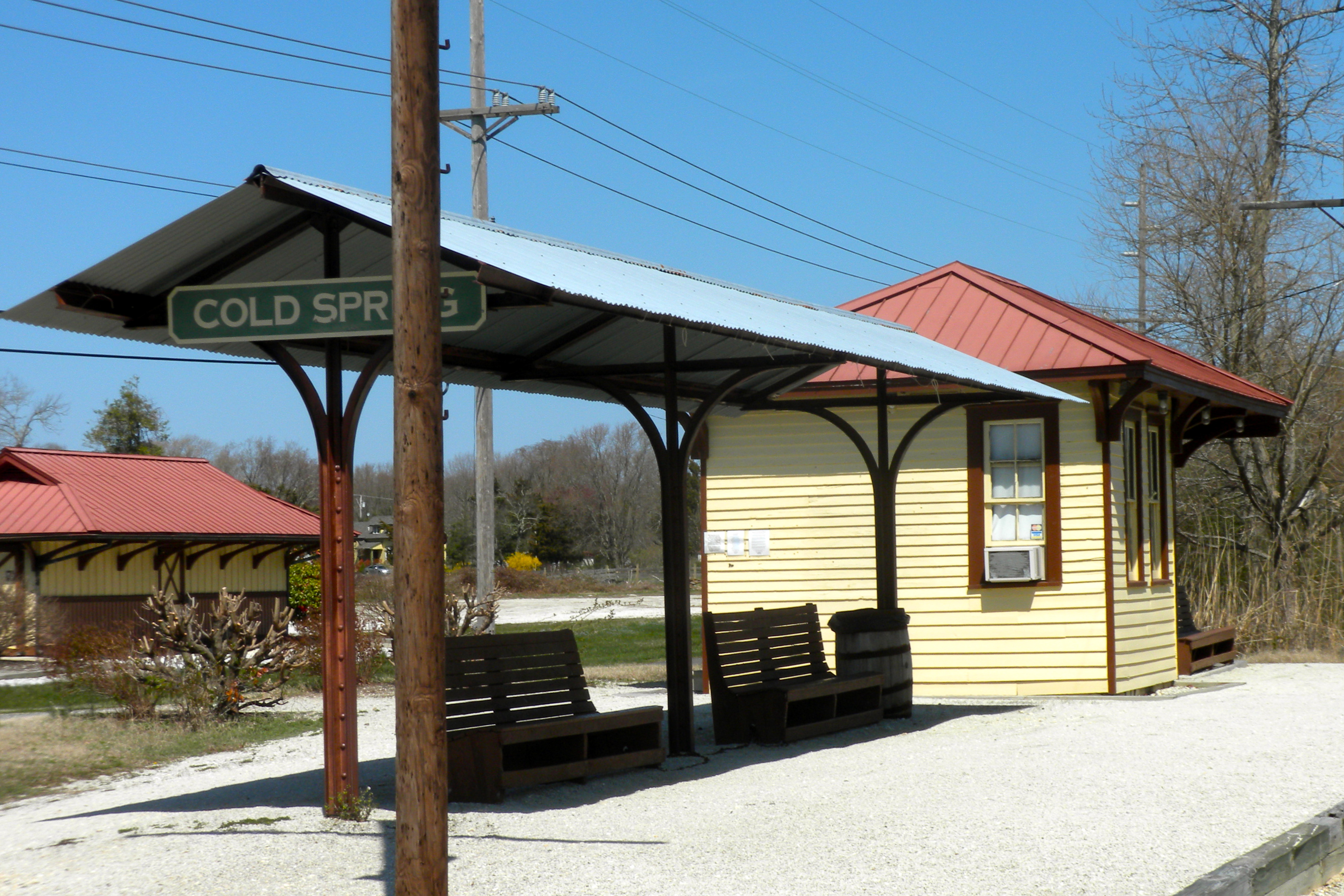
- Rio Grande station, relabeled as "Cold Spring" station for the Cape May Seashore Lines

General information
- Location: 720 U.S. Route 9, Lower Township, New Jersey
- Coordinates: 38°58′31″N 74°54′41″W
- System: Suspended CMSL excursion station

Suspended services
Preceding station	Cape May Seashore Lines	Following station
Terminus	Rio Grande – Cape May (suspended since 2012)	Cape May Terminus

Former services
Preceding station	Pennsylvania-Reading Seashore Lines	Following station
Wildwood Junction toward Camden	ACRR Cape May Branch	Bennett toward Cape May
- Rio Grande Station
- U.S. National Register of Historic Places
- New Jersey Register of Historic Places
- Location within Cape May County, New Jersey Location within New Jersey Location within the United States
- Area: 0.1 acres (0.040 ha)
- Built: 1894
- Architectural style: Queen Anne
- NRHP reference No.: 07000047
- NJRHP No.: 3047

Significant dates
- Added to NRHP: February 13, 2007
- Designated NJRHP: December 19, 2006
Location

Rio Grande is a historic passenger station located in Lower Township, Cape May County, New Jersey, United States. The station was built in 1894 by the Atlantic City Railroad. Subsequently, the station served passengers on the Pennsylvania-Reading Seashore Lines.

The station was donated to Historic Cold Spring Village, a history museum in Lower Township, and it was moved to the museum site in 1975. It now operates as a seasonal heritage railroad station for the Cape May Seashore Lines. The station was added to the National Register of Historic Places on February 13, 2007, for its significance in architecture. In the summer of 2013, the Cape May Seashore Lines operated Gas-powered speeder cars from Cold Spring Station to approximately one mile south on the line for the public. Since scrap vandals ravaged tracks from Woodbine to Dennisville in the summer of 2012, no locomotives or railcars have been able to operate to Cold Spring station or points farther south since 2011.

== See also ==
- Operating Passenger Railroad Stations Thematic Resource (New Jersey)
- National Register of Historic Places listings in Cape May County, New Jersey
