= Cape May City Rail Terminal =

Passenger rail station, Cape May City, NJ U.S.

Cape May
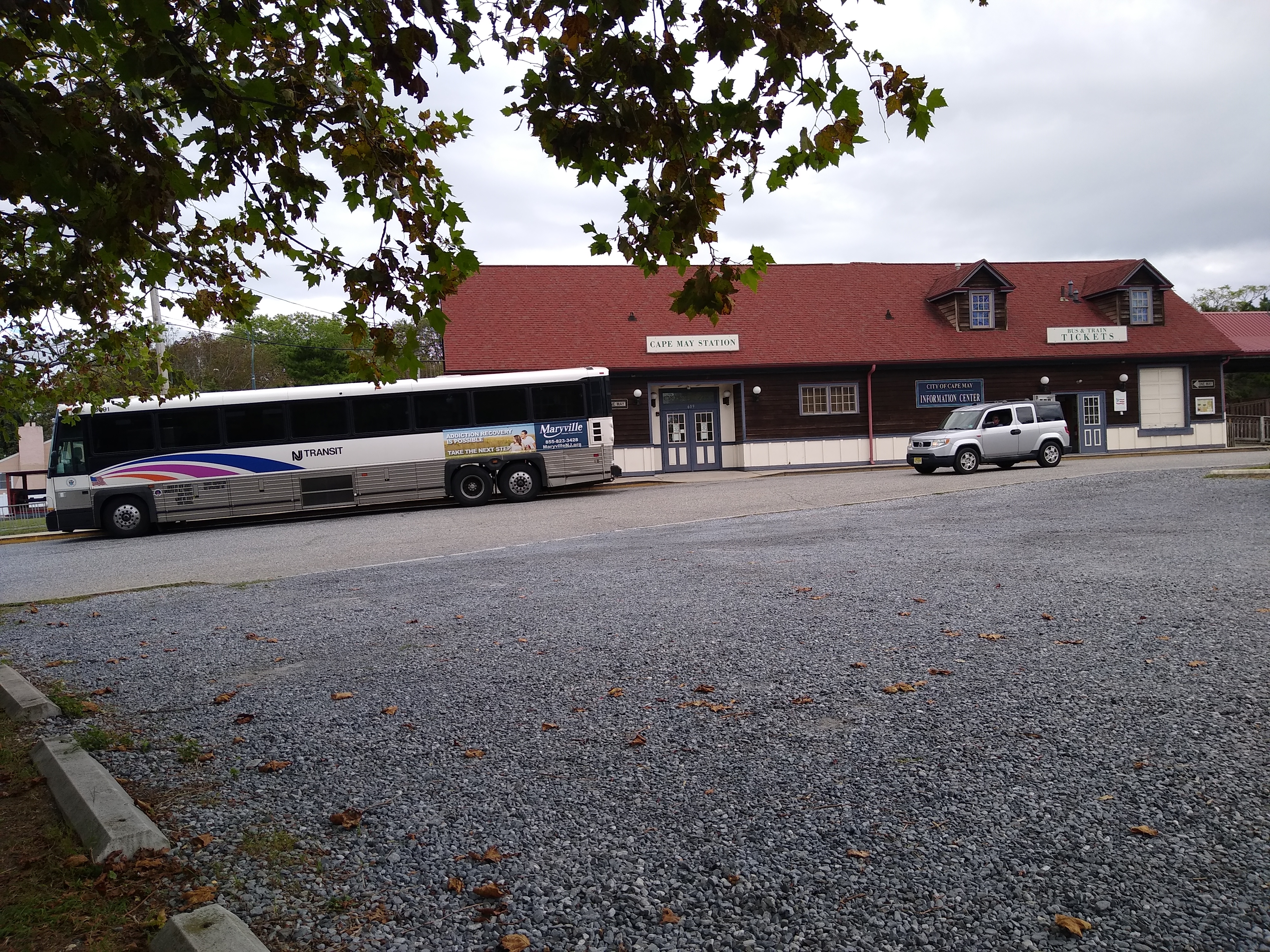

General information
- Coordinates: 38.9352°N 74.9226°W
- System: Suspended CMSL excursion station
- Owner: Cape May Seashore Lines
- Platforms: 1 side platform
- Tracks: 3
- Connections: MAC Trolly

Construction
- Accessible: Yes

Suspended services
Preceding station	Cape May Seashore Lines	Following station
Rio Grande Terminus	Rio Grande – Cape May (suspended since 2012)	Terminus

Former services
Preceding station	Pennsylvania-Reading Seashore Lines	Following station
Cold Spring toward Camden	ACRR Cape May Branch	Terminus
Location

The Cape May City Rail Terminal is a passenger train station in Cape May, New Jersey. The station offered train service from 1863 through 1981.

The station area last had regional passenger train service by the Pennsylvania-Reading Seashore Lines in the mid-1960s. Final service into Camden, New Jersey (across the Delaware River from Philadelphia) ended in January 1966, while service to Lindenwold station ended in October 1981.

Train service resumed in 1999, but stopped in 2005 due to structural concerns, but resumed again in 2010. The terminal is located at the intersection of Lafayette and Elmira Streets. Service was suspended after 2012 following extensive vandalism of the rail line. In 2015 the City of Cape May announced a proposal for parking space expansion that would pave over the tracks.

== Current service ==
- Cape May Seashore Lines
