= Tuckahoe, New Jersey =

Populated place in Cape May County, New Jersey, US

- Census-designated place
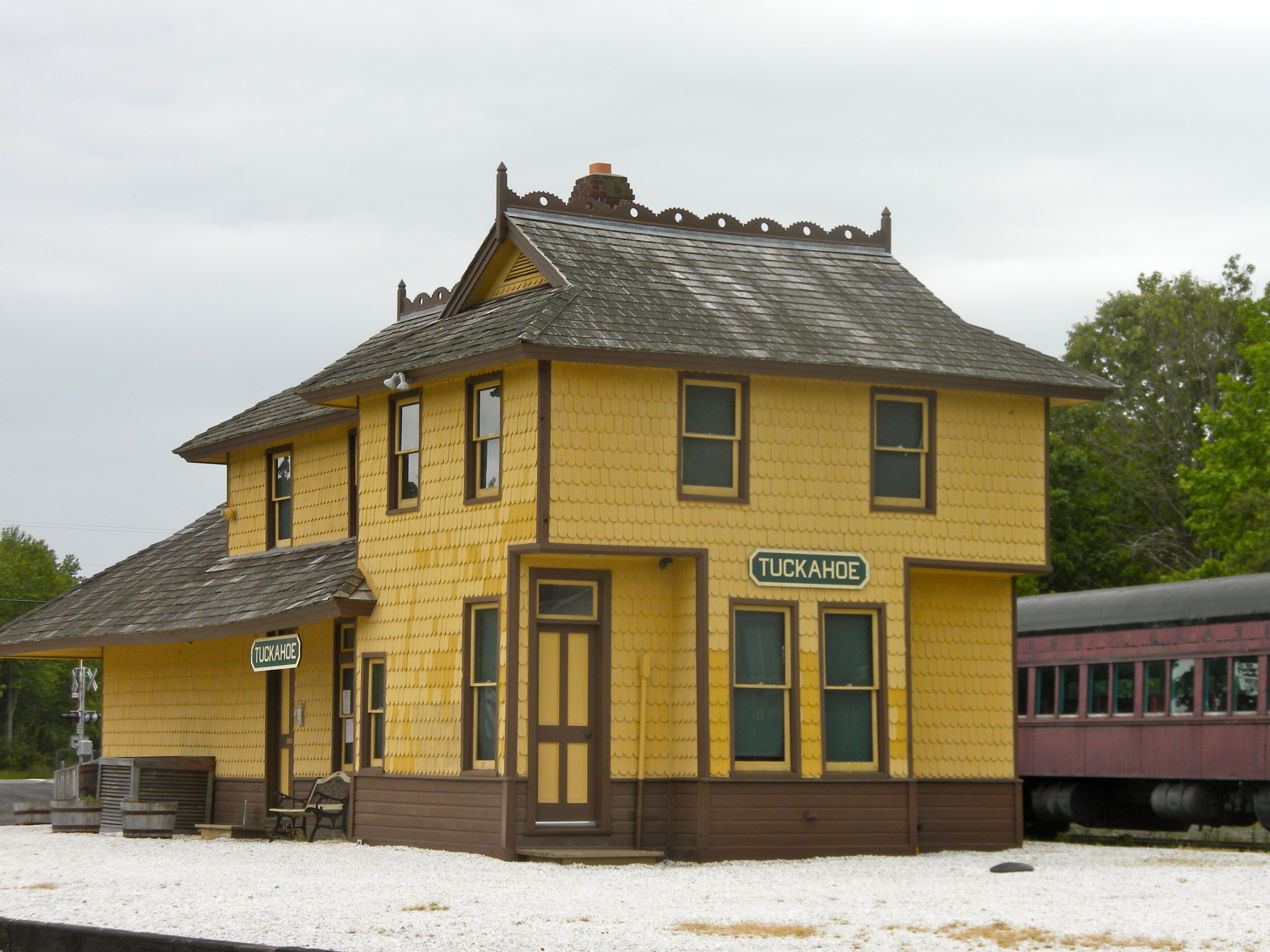
- Tuckahoe station, built in 1884 in Tuckahoe

- Location in Cape May County Location in New Jersey Location in the United States
- Coordinates: 39°17′24″N 74°45′14″W
- Country: United States
- State: New Jersey
- County: Cape May
- Township: Upper

Area
  - Total: 1.04 sq mi (2.70 km^{2})
  - Land: 1.04 sq mi (2.70 km^{2})
  - Water: 0 sq mi (0.00 km^{2})

Population (2020)
  - Total: 357
  - Density: 342.4/sq mi (132.21/km^{2})
- Time zone: UTC−05:00 (Eastern (EST))
  - Summer (DST): UTC−04:00 (Eastern (EDT))
- ZIP Codes: 08250
- Area code: 609
- FIPS code: 34-74180

Tuckahoe is a census-designated place (CDP) unincorporated community located within Upper Township in Cape May County of New Jersey. As of the 2020 census, Tuckahoe had a population of 357.

== History ==
The tuckahoe plant was pounded into pulp by local Native Americans and used for cooking and baking, as flour, which served as an ingredient in their cornbread.

Since the tuckahoe was found in great abundance in this area, members of various Lenape tribes would visit this location to collect them.

A bridge, constructed in 1926 and renovated in 1961, connects Tuckahoe to Corbin City, its neighbor to the north. It is also the headquarters for the Cape May Seashore Lines Railroad.

Tuckahoe is named after the wild tuckahoe, which is the sclerotium of the fungus Wolfiporia extensa and sometimes also called Indian Bread, which grew in abundance in this area on the roots of certain trees and was collected by the members of the Lenape tribes in the area.

== Demographics ==
Historical population
Census	Pop.	Note	%±
2020	357		—
U.S. Decennial Census

Tuckahoe first appeared as a census designated place in the 2020 U.S. census.

Tuckahoe CDP, New Jersey – Racial and ethnic composition Note: the US Census treats Hispanic/Latino as an ethnic category. This table excludes Latinos from the racial categories and assigns them to a separate category. Hispanics/Latinos may be of any race.
Race / Ethnicity (NH = Non-Hispanic)	Pop 2020	2020
White alone (NH)	323	90.48%
Black or African American alone (NH)	2	0.56%
Native American or Alaska Native alone (NH)	0	0.00%
Asian alone (NH)	0	0.00%
Native Hawaiian or Pacific Islander alone (NH)	0	0.00%
Other race alone (NH)	0	0.00%
Mixed race or Multiracial (NH)	16	4.48%
Hispanic or Latino (any race)	16	4.48%
Total	357	100.00%

== Roads ==
Tuckahoe Road, which has its beginnings in Cross Keys, New Jersey at Route 42, provides access to Ocean City at the northern edge of Cape May County and other shore points as an alternative route to the Atlantic City Expressway.

== Education ==
As with other parts of Upper Township, the area is zoned to Upper Township School District (for grades K-8), which sends students to Ocean City High School for grades 9-12.

Countywide schools include Cape May County Technical High School and Cape May County Special Services School District.

== See also ==
- Tuckahoe station (New Jersey)
- Lenape
- Kechemeche
