= Richland, New Jersey =

Populated place in Atlantic County, New Jersey, US

- Census-designated place
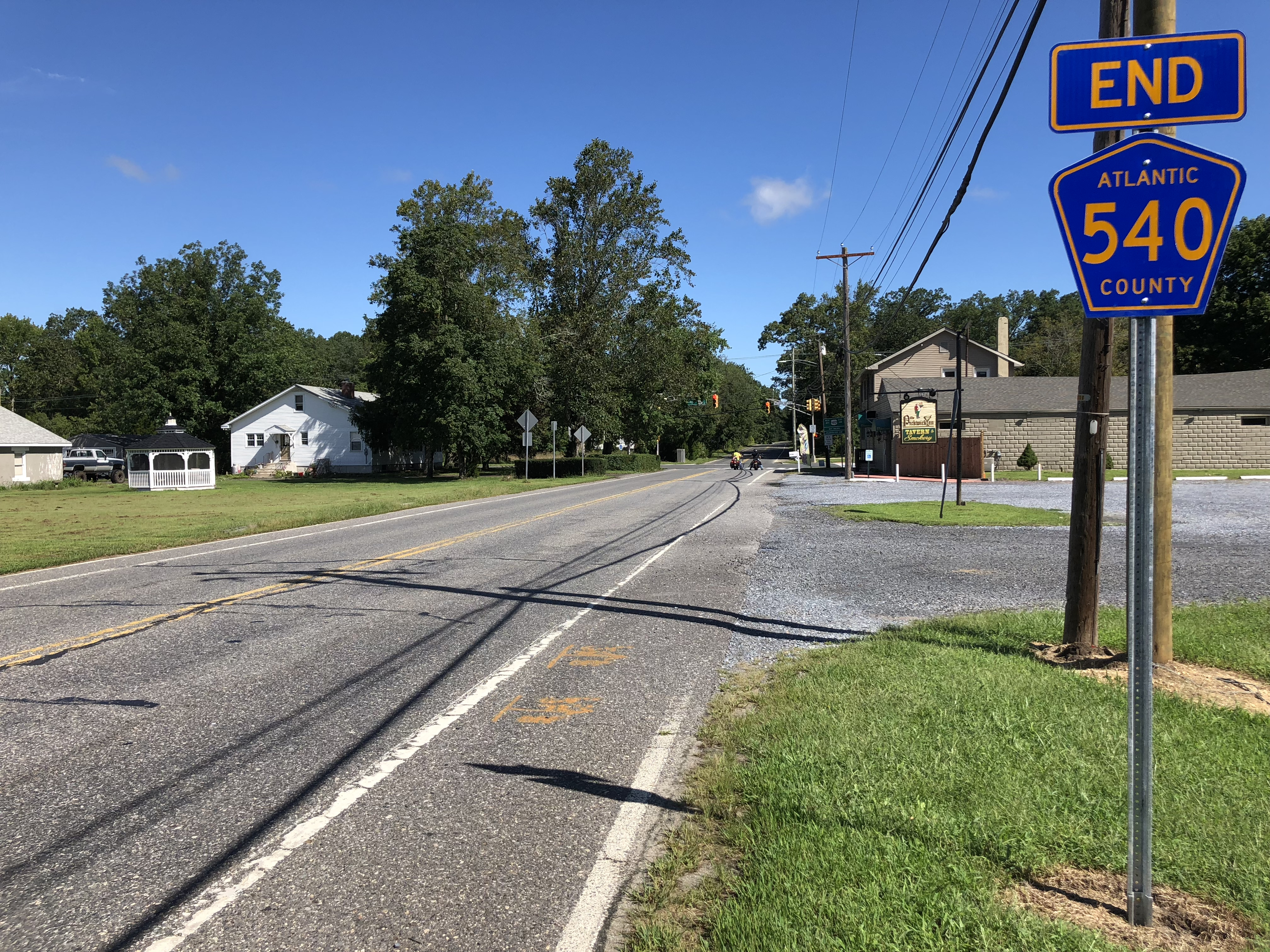
- Eastern terminus of CR 540 in Richland

- Location in Atlantic County Location in New Jersey Location in the United States
- Coordinates: 39°29′30″N 74°52′15″W
- Country: United States
- State: New Jersey
- County: Atlantic
- Township: Buena Vista

Area
  - Total: 3.34 sq mi (8.66 km^{2})
  - Land: 3.33 sq mi (8.63 km^{2})
  - Water: 0.012 sq mi (0.03 km^{2})
- Elevation: 95 ft (29 m)

Population (2020)
  - Total: 623
  - Density: 186.9/sq mi (72.16/km^{2})
- ZIP Code: 08350
- FIPS code: 34-62790
- GNIS feature ID: 0879677

Historical population
Census	Pop.	Note	%±
2020	623		—
U.S. Decennial Census

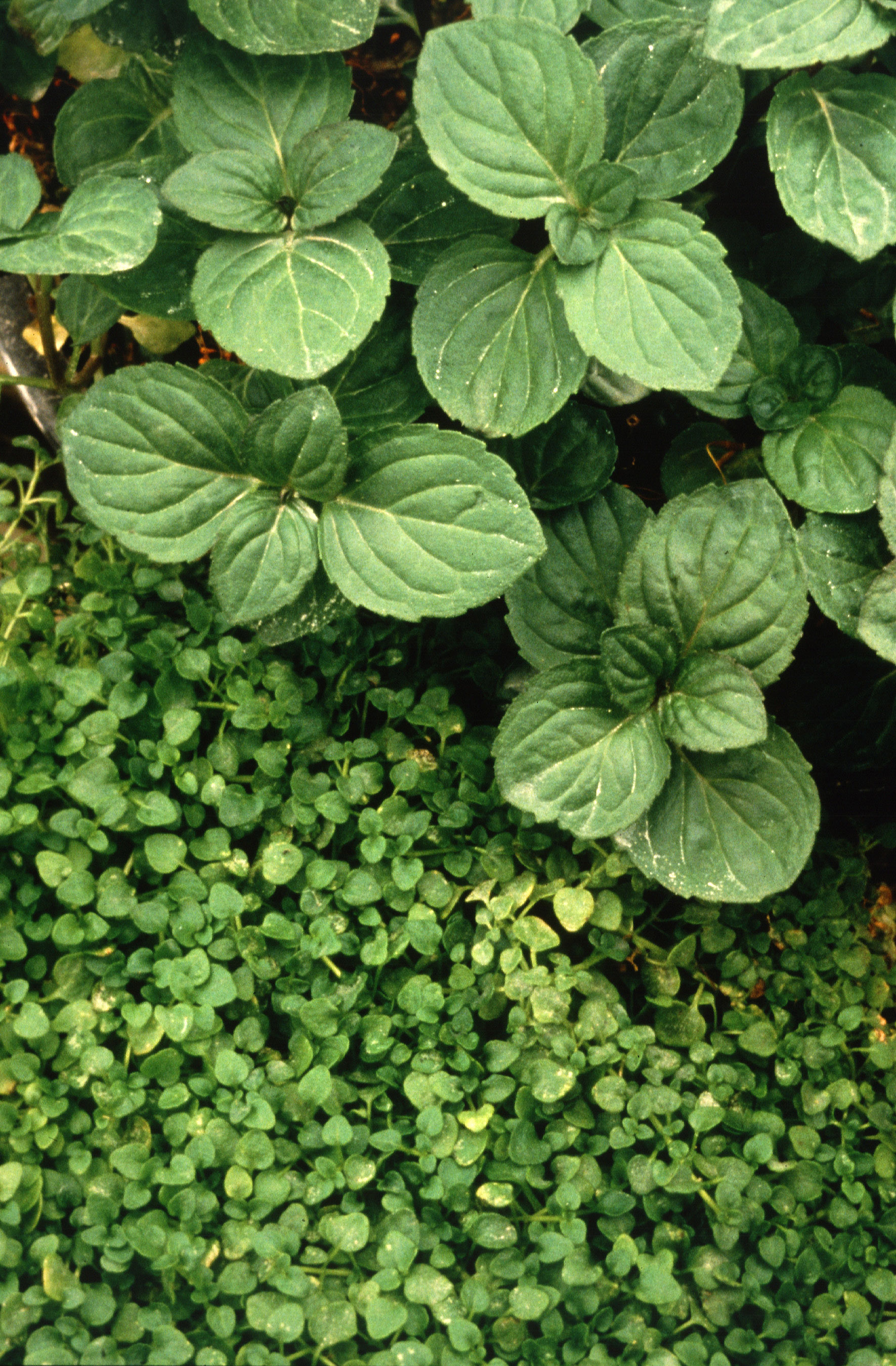
The area is a major supplier of mint.

Richland is an unincorporated community and census-designated place (CDP) located within Buena Vista Township in Atlantic County, in the U.S. state of New Jersey. As of the 2020 census, Richland had a population of 623. The area is served as United States Postal Service ZIP Code 08350.

The Cape May Seashore Lines operates passenger rail service from Richland to Tuckahoe, from a scale reproduction of the original Richland Station, which was removed in the mid-1960s.

== History ==
On April 26, 2004, the Buena Vista Township Committee voted to temporarily rename the community of Richland, a section of Buena Vista Township. For the first half of the month of May 2004, Richland became Mojito, New Jersey, named after the Cuban rum drink. Bacardi had offered to give the township $5,000 for recreation projects in exchange for commemorating the new name with a sign on U.S. Route 40 for those weeks. Richland was chosen because it is home to the family-run Dalponte Farms, a major East Coast supplier of mint, an essential ingredient of the mojito.

== Demographics ==
Richland was first listed as a census designated place in the 2020 U.S. census.

Richland CDP, New Jersey – Racial and ethnic composition Note: the US Census treats Hispanic/Latino as an ethnic category. This table excludes Latinos from the racial categories and assigns them to a separate category. Hispanics/Latinos may be of any race.
Race / Ethnicity (NH = Non-Hispanic)	Pop 2020	2020
White alone (NH)	412	66.13%
Black or African American alone (NH)	79	12.68%
Native American or Alaska Native alone (NH)	0	0.00%
Asian alone (NH)	9	1.44%
Native Hawaiian or Pacific Islander alone (NH)	0	0.00%
Other race alone (NH)	8	1.28%
Mixed race or Multiracial (NH)	16	2.57%
Hispanic or Latino (any race)	99	15.89%
Total	623	100.00%

== Education ==
Public school students living in the CDP are served by the Buena Regional School District.

Founded in 1959, St. Augustine Preparatory School is an all-male Catholic high school, operated within the Roman Catholic Diocese of Camden.

== Attractions ==
- Cape May Seashore Lines
- Patcong Valley Railroad Museum
