= Whitesboro-Burleigh, New Jersey =

Populated place in Cape May County, New Jersey, US

- Former census-designated place
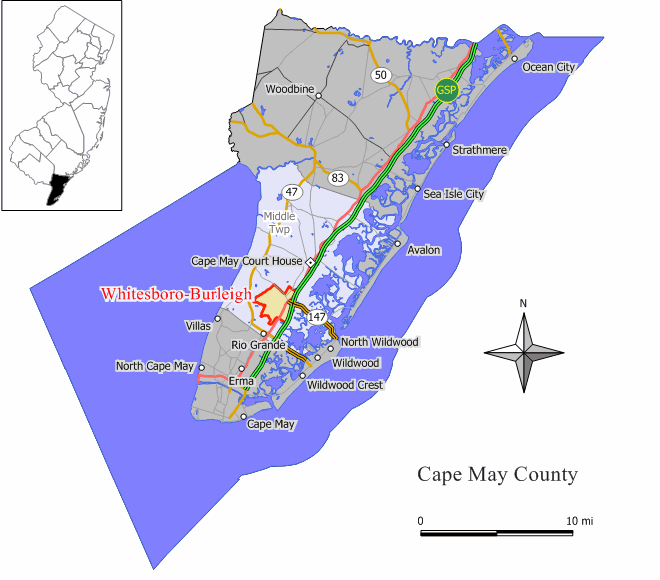
- Map of Whitesboro-Burleigh CDP in Cape May County
- Coordinates: 39°2′15″N 74°51′40″W
- Country: United States
- state: New Jersey
- County: Cape May

Area
  - Total: 4.1 sq mi (10.7 km^{2})
  - Land: 4.1 sq mi (10.7 km^{2})
  - Water: 0 sq mi (0.0 km^{2})

Population (2000)
  - Total: 1,836
  - Density: 446/sq mi (172.3/km^{2})
- Time zone: UTC−05:00 (Eastern (EST))
  - Summer (DST): UTC−04:00 (Eastern (EDT))
- FIPS code: 34-80855

Whitesboro-Burleigh was a census-designated place and unincorporated community located within Middle Township, in Cape May County, in the U.S. state of New Jersey. It is part of the Ocean City Metropolitan Statistical Area. As of the 2000 United States census, the CDP's population was 1,836. In the 2010 United States census, the Whitesboro-Burleigh CDP was split into two new CDPs, Whitesboro and Burleigh.

Whitesboro was founded as a planned residential community for African Americans and has the majority-black population of the township.

== History ==
Whitesboro was founded about 1901 by the Equitable Industrial Association, which had prominent black American investors including Paul Laurence Dunbar, the educator Booker T. Washington and George Henry White, the leading investor and namesake. He was an attorney who had moved to Philadelphia after serving as the last black Republican congressman representing North Carolina's 2nd congressional district. White and his fellow entrepreneurs wanted to create a self-reliant community for blacks, without the discrimination faced in the southern states. Shares in the planned community were sold to African Americans from North and South Carolina and Virginia.

In 2006, the Johnson Family Historical Trust discovered the value of its original deed to Whitesboro property from the George H. White Realty Company. It has been called one of "America's Untold Treasures" by the renowned African-American appraiser Phillip Merrill. The Johnson Family Historical Trust holds rare items important to Whitesboro, such as a 1936 formerly owned by James L. Johnson, a nationally recognized ham radio operator. His radios are of interest to Whitesboro and national history in technology.

There are more than 50 known and appraised artifacts from the original investors of the town that planned to be featured in Whitesboro in the few years to come. This summer a dig for national history will take place to uncover more artifacts at various historical sites in Whitesboro hosted by the Johnson Family Historical Trust.

== Geography ==
According to the United States Census Bureau, the CDP has a total area of 10.7 km^{2} (4.1 sq mi). 10.6 km^{2} (4.1 sq mi) of land and 0.24% of it was water.

== Demographics ==
Historical population
Census	Pop.	Note	%±
1990	2,080		—
2000	1,836		−11.7%

As of the 2000 United States census there were 1,836 people, 759 households, and 478 families residing in the CDP. The population density was 172.5 people /km^{2} (447 people/mi^{2}). There were 975 housing units at an average density of 91.6 units /km^{2} (237 units/mi^{2}). The racial makeup of the CDP was 60.08% White, 35.19% African American, 0.27% Native American, 0.93% Asian, 0.05% Pacific Islander, 1.31% from other races, and 2.18% from two or more races. Hispanic or Latino of any race were 3.10% of the population.

There were 759 households, out of which 23.2% had children under the age of 18 living with them, 44.1% were married couples living together, 14.1% had a female householder with no husband present, and 37.0% were non-families. 32.8% of all households were made up of individuals, and 21.2% had someone living alone who was 65 years of age or older. The average household size was 2.42 and the average family size was 3.05.

In the CDP the population was spread out, with 24.0% under the age of 18, 5.7% from 18 to 24, 23.7% from 25 to 44, 21.8% from 45 to 64, and 24.8% who were 65 years of age or older. The median age was 43 years. For every 100 females, there were 91.3 males. For every 100 females age 18 and over, there were 83.3 males.

The median income for a household in the CDP was $34,231, and the median income for a family was $42,568. Males had a median income of $32,179 versus $24,612 for females. The per capita income for the CDP was $16,812. About 4.2% of families and 9.2% of the population were below the poverty line, including 16.0% of those under age 18 and 9.5% of those age 65 or over.

== Education ==
It is within the Middle Township School District which operates Middle Township High School.

Countywide schools include Cape May County Technical High School and Cape May County Special Services School District.

In 1993 Richard Degener of The Press of Atlantic City described what is now the location of the private K-12 school Cape Christian Academy as being in Burleigh. The school is currently in the Cape May Courthouse CDP and not the Burleigh CDP.

== Notable people ==
People who were born in, residents of, or otherwise closely associated with Whitesboro-Burleigh include:

- Stedman Graham, one of the numerous 1,000-point scorers for the Middle Township High School boys varsity basketball team. He is an American educator, author, businessman, speaker and served in the United States Army. He is also the longtime partner of media mogul Oprah Winfrey.
