= Whitesboro, New Jersey =

Populated place in Cape May County, New Jersey, US

- Census-designated place
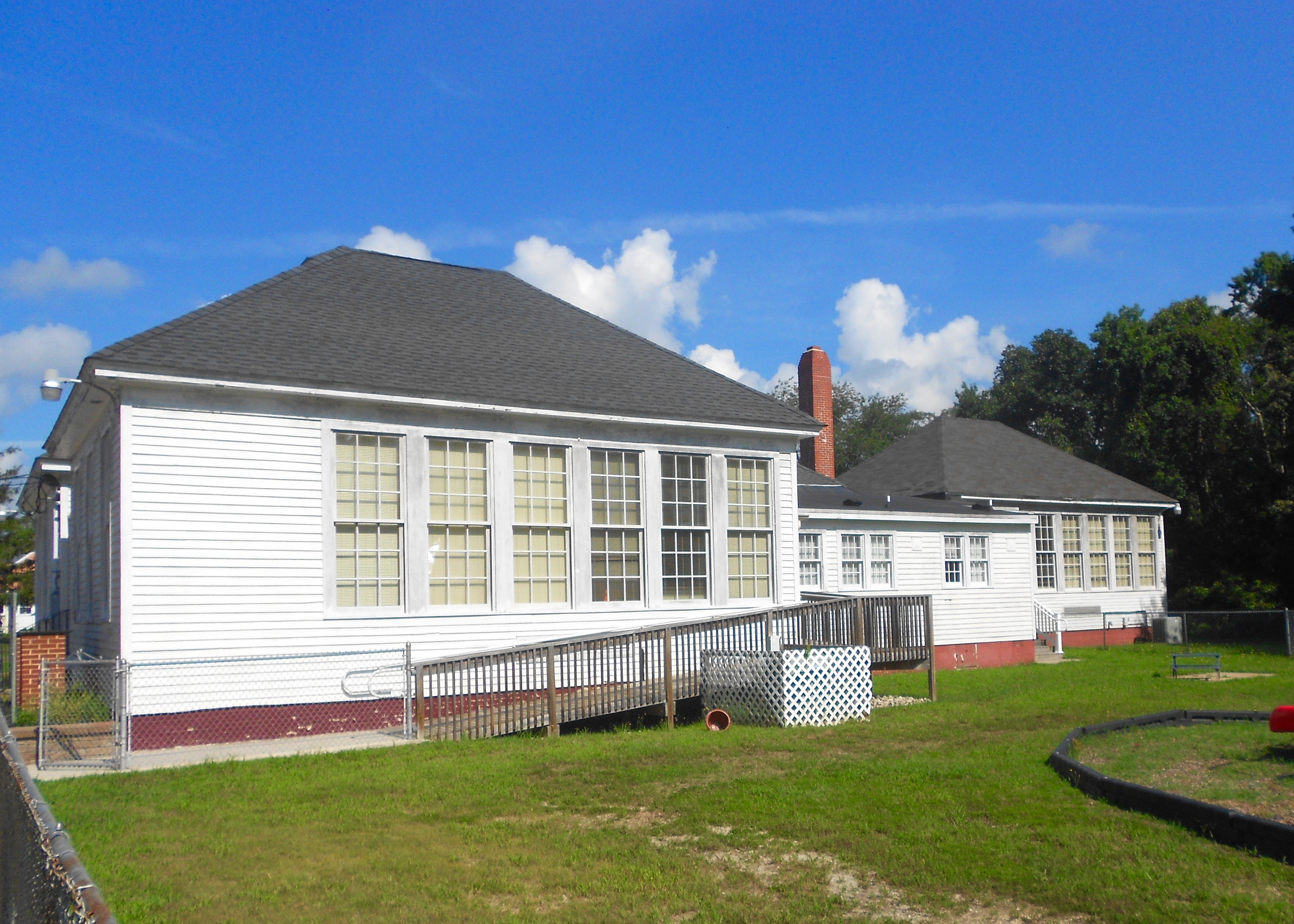
- Whitesboro School

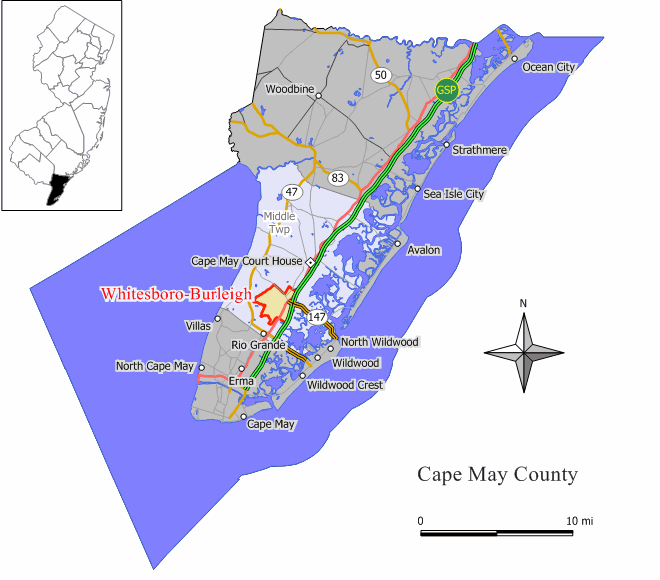
- Map of the former Whitesboro-Burleigh CDP in Cape May County. Inset: Location of Cape May County in New Jersey.

- Location in Cape May County Location in New Jersey Location in the United States
- Coordinates: 39.042252°N 74.868134°W
- Country: United States
- State: New Jersey
- County: Cape May
- Township: Middle
- Named for: George Henry White

Area
  - Total: 3.56 sq mi (9.22 km^{2})
  - Land: 3.54 sq mi (9.17 km^{2})
  - Water: 0.019 sq mi (0.05 km^{2}) 0.50%
- Elevation: 20 ft (6 m)

Population (2020)
  - Total: 2,300
  - Density: 649.6/sq mi (250.83/km^{2})
- Time zone: UTC−05:00 (Eastern (EST))
  - Summer (DST): UTC−04:00 (Eastern (EDT))
- ZIP Code: 08252 - Cape May
- Area codes: 609 and 640
- FIPS code: 34-80855
- GNIS feature ID: 02390509

Whitesboro is an unincorporated community and census-designated place (CDP) located within Middle Township in Cape May County, in the U.S. state of New Jersey. Until the 2000 census the area had been part of the Whitesboro-Burleigh CDP, which was split in 2010 into separate CDPs for Burleigh and Whitesboro. As of the 2020 census, Whitesboro had a population of 2,300. Whitesboro was founded as a planned residential community for African Americans and has the majority of the township's black population.

== History ==
Whitesboro was founded about 1901 by the Equitable Industrial Association, which had prominent black American investors including Paul Laurence Dunbar, the educator Booker T. Washington and George Henry White, the leading investor and namesake. He was an attorney who had moved to Philadelphia after serving as the last black Republican congressman representing North Carolina's 2nd congressional district. White and his fellow entrepreneurs wanted to create a self-reliant community for blacks without the discrimination faced by black residents of the southern states. Shares in the planned community were sold to African Americans from North and South Carolina and Virginia.

In 2006, the Johnson Family Historical Trust discovered the value of its original deed to Whitesboro property from the George H. White Realty Company. It has been called one of "America's Untold Treasures" by appraiser Phillip Merrill. The Johnson Family Historical Trust holds rare items important to Whitesboro, such as a 1936 radio formerly owned by James L. Johnson, a nationally recognized ham radio operator. His radios are of interest to Whitesboro and national history in technology.

There are more than 50 known and appraised artifacts from the original investors of the town that will be featured in Whitesboro in upcoming years. A dig for national history is planned to uncover more artifacts at various historical sites in Whitesboro, hosted by the Johnson Family Historical Trust.

In 2024 there was a group, the one controlling the Whitesboro Historic Preservation Project, advocating for establishing Whitesboro as an independent municipality.

== Geography ==
According to the United States Census Bureau, the CDP had a total area of 3.632 square miles (9.406 km^{2}), including 3.614 square miles (9.360 km^{2}) of land and 0.018 square miles (0.047 km^{2}) of water (0.50%).

== Demographics ==
Historical population
Census	Pop.	Note	%±
2010	2,205		—
2020	2,300		4.3%
Population sources: 2010

Whitesboro first appeared as a census designated place in the 2010 U.S. census formed from the deleted Whitesboro-Burleigh CDP.

=== Racial and ethnic composition ===
Whitesboro CDP, New Jersey – Racial and ethnic composition Note: the US Census treats Hispanic/Latino as an ethnic category. This table excludes Latinos from the racial categories and assigns them to a separate category. Hispanics/Latinos may be of any race.
Race / Ethnicity (NH = Non-Hispanic)	Pop 2010	Pop 2020	% 2010	% 2020
White alone (NH)	1,098	1,135	49.80%	49.35%
Black or African American alone (NH)	783	636	35.51%	27.65%
Native American or Alaska Native alone (NH)	9	10	0.41%	0.43%
Asian alone (NH)	25	37	1.13%	1.61%
Native Hawaiian or Pacific Islander alone (NH)	0	2	0.00%	0.09%
Other race alone (NH)	10	13	0.45%	0.57%
Mixed race or Multiracial (NH)	87	134	3.95%	5.83%
Hispanic or Latino (any race)	193	333	8.75%	14.48%
Total	2,205	2,300	100.00%	100.00%

=== 2020 census ===
As of the 2020 census, Whitesboro had a population of 2,300. The median age was 41.1 years. 24.0% of residents were under the age of 18 and 20.3% of residents were 65 years of age or older. For every 100 females there were 90.7 males, and for every 100 females age 18 and over there were 90.3 males age 18 and over.

79.1% of residents lived in urban areas, while 20.9% lived in rural areas.

There were 888 households in Whitesboro, of which 28.0% had children under the age of 18 living in them. Of all households, 41.8% were married-couple households, 18.5% were households with a male householder and no spouse or partner present, and 29.2% were households with a female householder and no spouse or partner present. About 29.3% of all households were made up of individuals and 16.1% had someone living alone who was 65 years of age or older.

There were 1,080 housing units, of which 17.8% were vacant. The homeowner vacancy rate was 3.2% and the rental vacancy rate was 4.3%.

=== 2010 census ===
The 2010 United States census counted 2,205 people, 870 households, and 572 families in the CDP. The population density was 610.2 per square mile (235.6/km^{2}). There were 1,072 housing units at an average density of 296.6 per square mile (114.5/km^{2}). The racial makeup was 53.02% (1,169) White, 37.05% (817) Black or African American, 0.45% (10) Native American, 1.13% (25) Asian, 0.00% (0) Pacific Islander, 3.13% (69) from other races, and 5.22% (115) from two or more races. Hispanic or Latino of any race were 8.75% (193) of the population.

Of the 870 households, 23.2% had children under the age of 18; 42.0% were married couples living together; 18.3% had a female householder with no husband present and 34.3% were non-families. Of all households, 30.2% were made up of individuals and 17.9% had someone living alone who was 65 years of age or older. The average household size was 2.53 and the average family size was 3.15.

24.2% of the population were under the age of 18, 8.3% from 18 to 24, 21.9% from 25 to 44, 24.3% from 45 to 64, and 21.3% who were 65 years of age or older. The median age was 41.5 years. For every 100 females, the population had 89.9 males. For every 100 females ages 18 and older there were 84.8 males.

== Government and infrastructure ==
The township's Martin Luther King Junior Community Center is located in Whitesboro.

In 2024 residents habitually used the ZIP code 08252, but received an advisory that they should use Cape May Courthouse's ZIP code, 08210, instead. Pro-incorporation activists argued that this was a sign that community identity was waning.

== Education ==
It is within the Middle Township School District, which operates Middle Township High School.

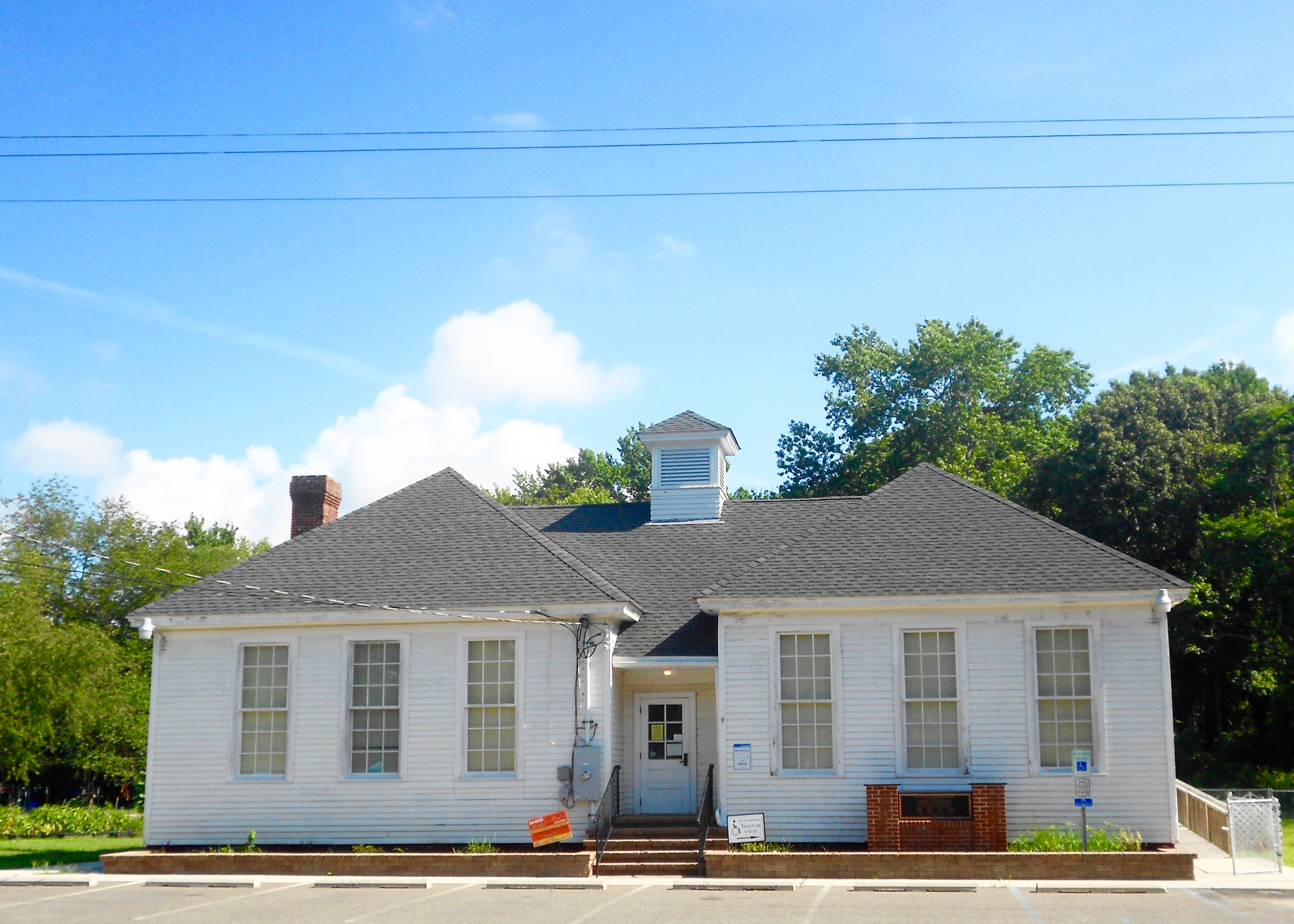
Front of Whitesboro School

Countywide schools include Cape May County Technical High School and Cape May County Special Services School District.

In the era of de jure educational segregation in the United States, a school for black children was maintained in Whitesboro for grades 1-8.

== Notable people ==
People who were born in, residents of, or otherwise closely associated with Whitesboro include:

- Stedman Graham (born 1951), a 1,000-point scorer for the Middle Township High School boys varsity basketball team; he is an educator, author, businessman, and speaker who is the longtime partner of media mogul Oprah Winfrey.
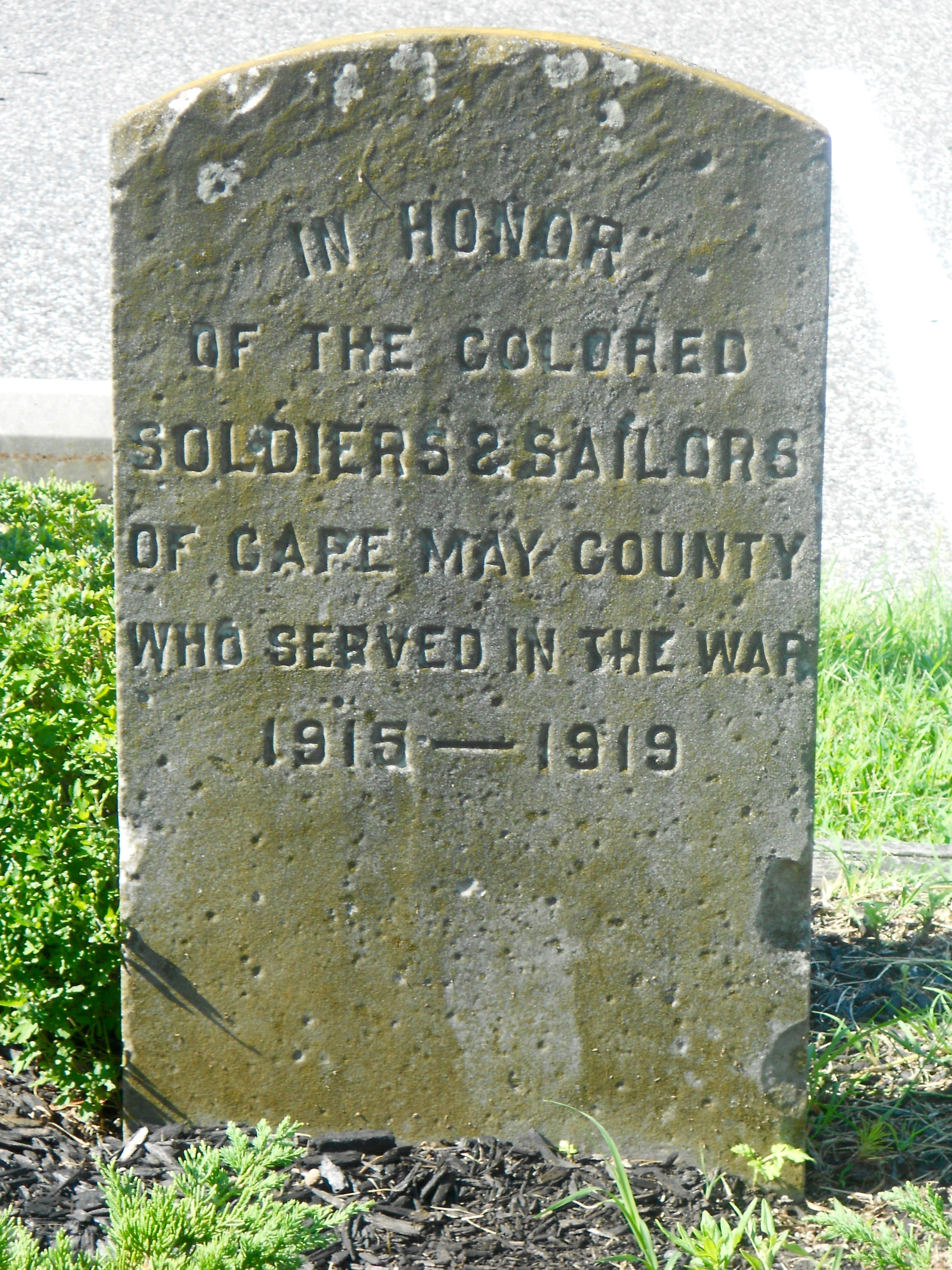
World War I memorial

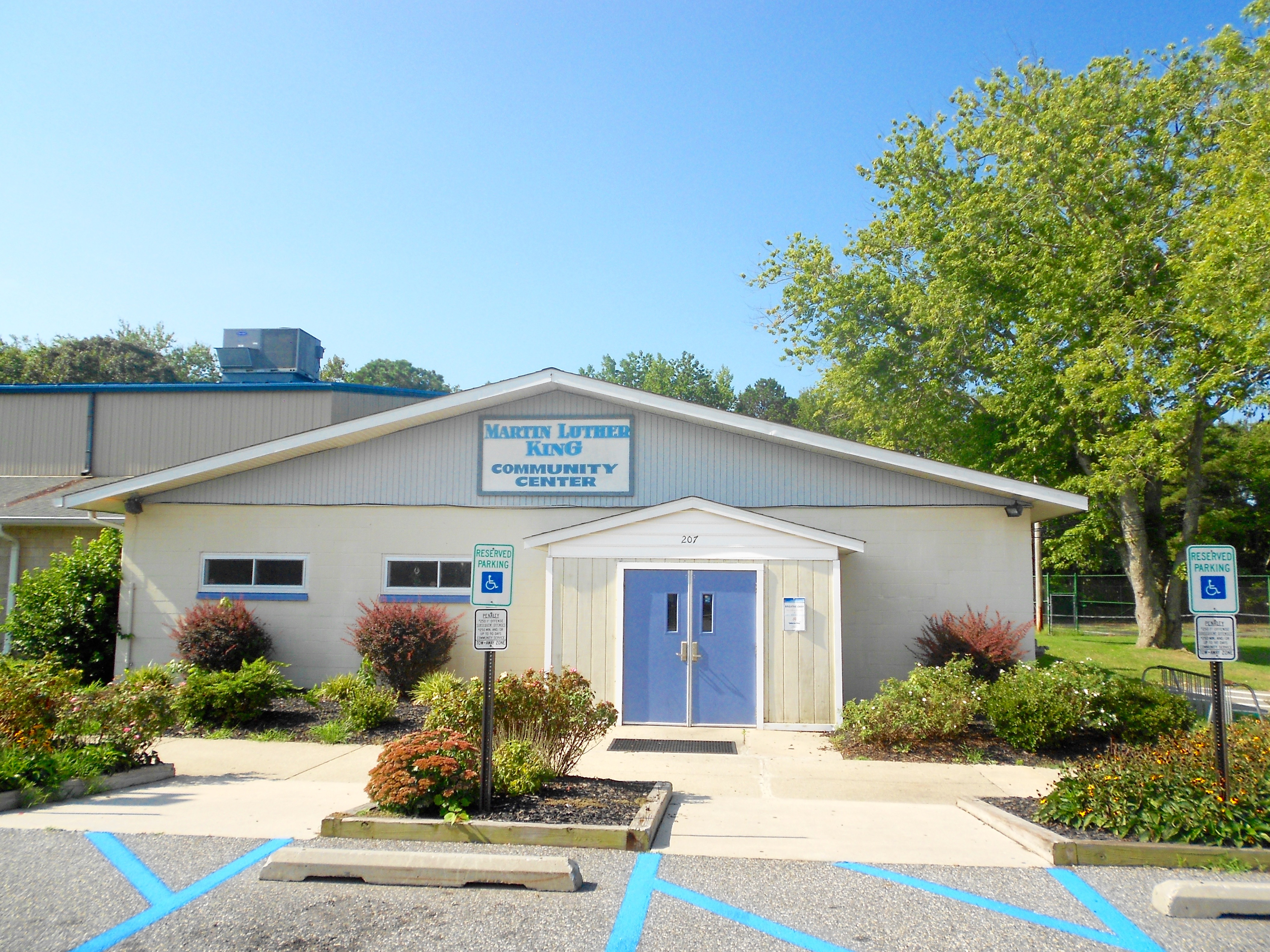
Martin Luther King Community Center

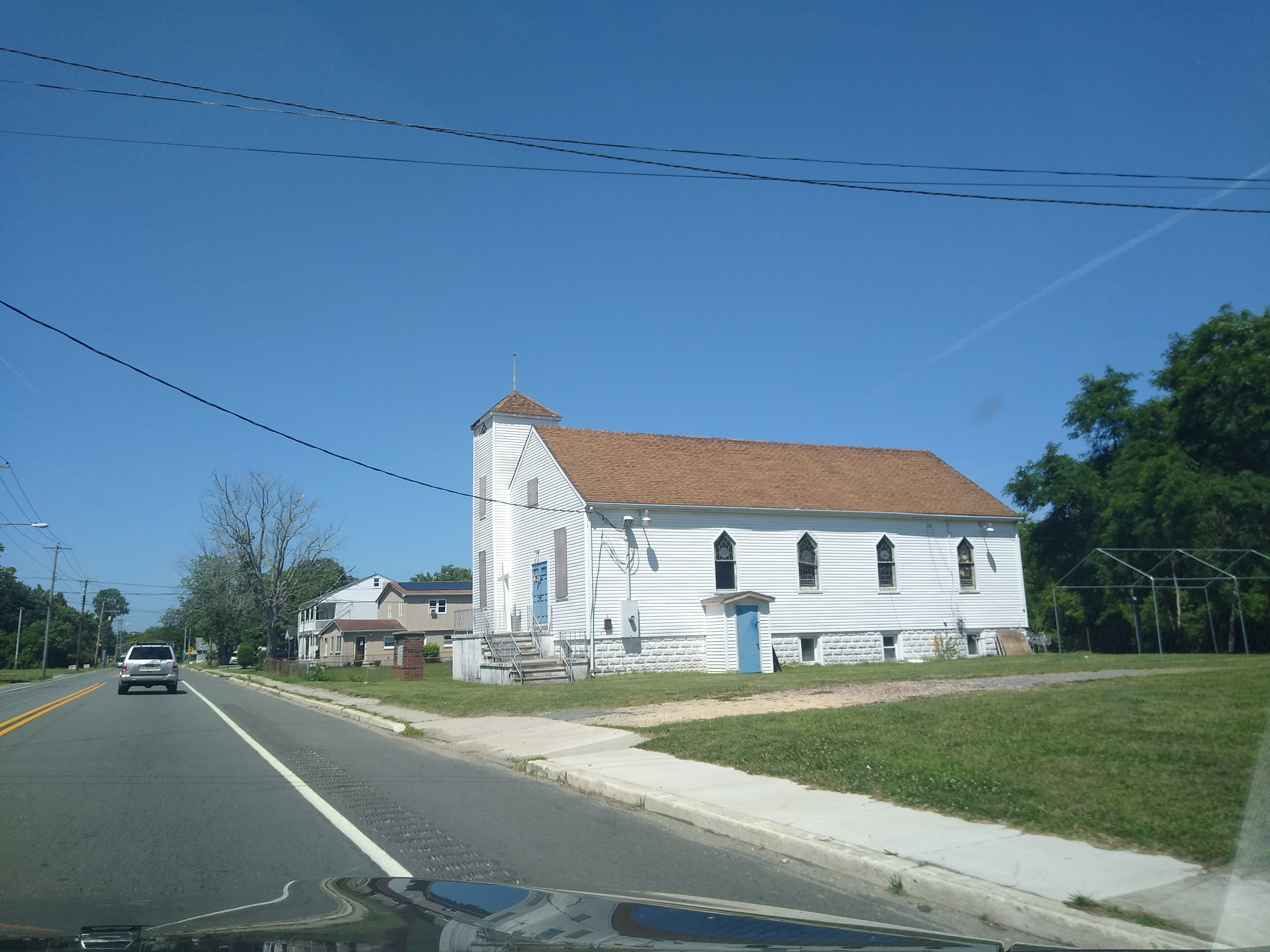
St. Stephen AME Church
