= Burleigh, New Jersey =

Populated place in Cape May County, New Jersey, US

- Census-designated place
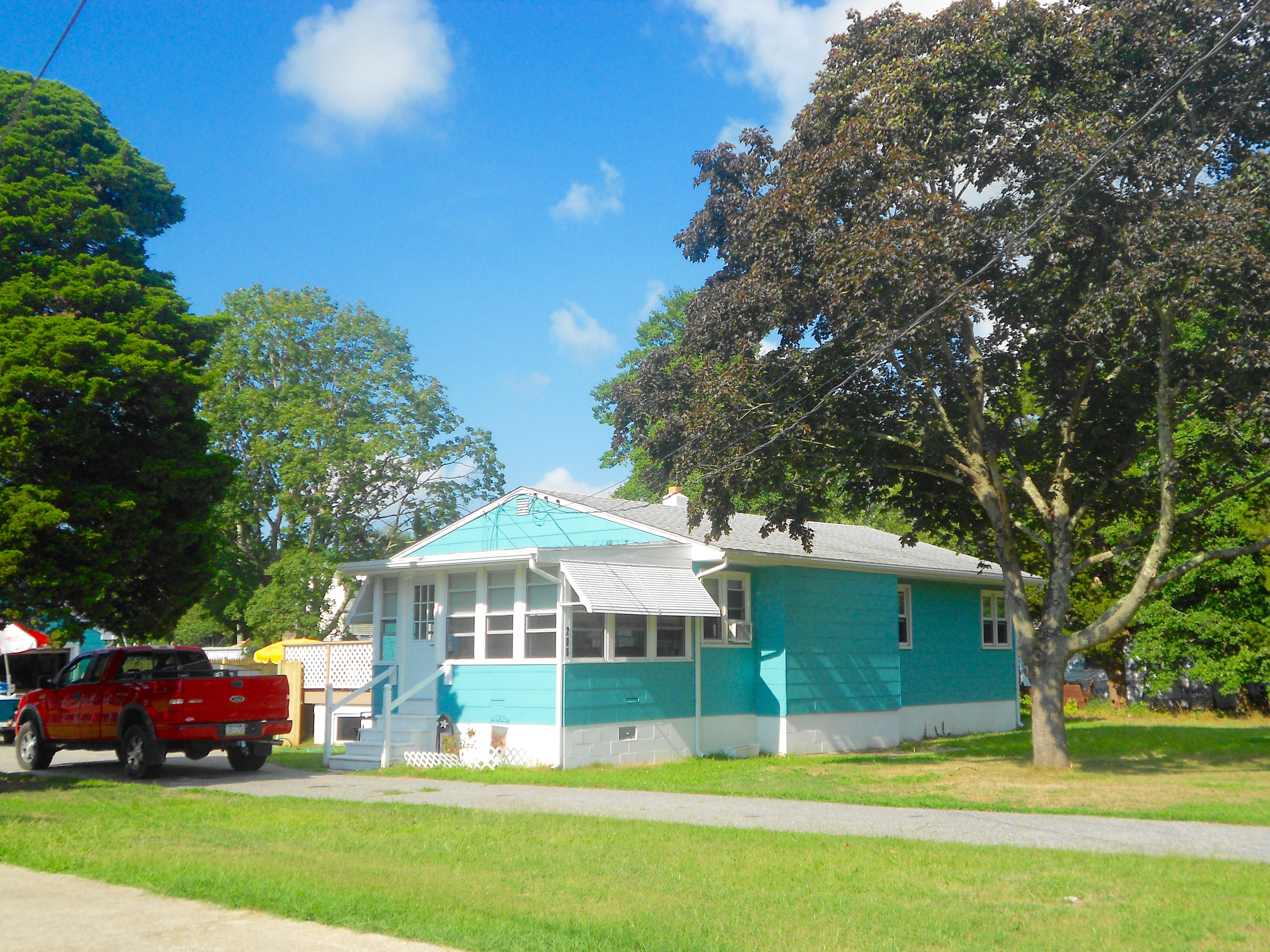
- House in Burleigh

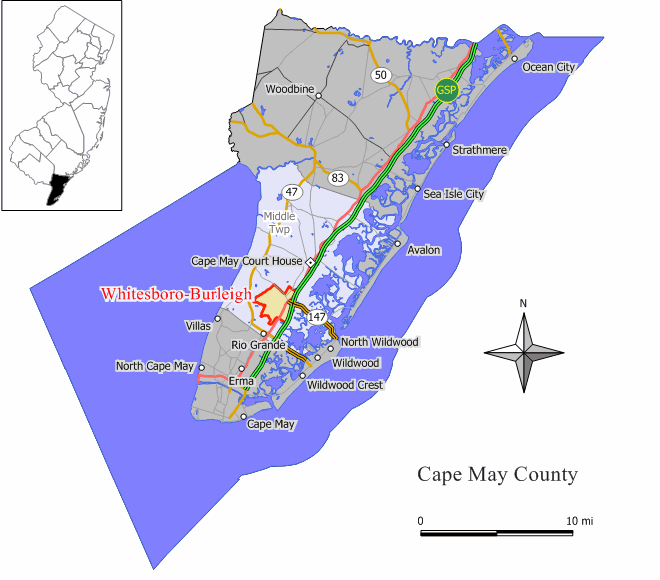
- Map of the former Whitesboro-Burleigh CDP in Cape May County. Inset: Location of Cape May County in New Jersey.

- Location in Cape May County Location in New Jersey Location in the United States
- Coordinates: 39.047486°N 74.846665°W
- Country: United States
- State: New Jersey
- County: Cape May
- Township: Middle

Area
  - Total: 1.56 sq mi (4.03 km^{2})
  - Land: 1.52 sq mi (3.94 km^{2})
  - Water: 0.031 sq mi (0.08 km^{2}) 2.07%
- Elevation: 9.8 ft (3 m)

Population (2020)
  - Total: 766
  - Density: 503/sq mi (194.2/km^{2})
- Time zone: UTC−05:00 (Eastern (EST))
  - Summer (DST): UTC−04:00 (Eastern (EDT))
- ZIP Code: 08210 - Cape May
- Area code: 609
- FIPS code: 34-08890
- GNIS feature ID: 02583977

Burleigh is an unincorporated community and census-designated place (CDP) located within Middle Township in Cape May County, in the U.S. state of New Jersey; Until the 2000 census the area had been part of the Whitesboro-Burleigh CDP, which was split in 2010 into separate CDPs for Burleigh and Whitesboro. As of the 2020 census, Burleigh had a population of 766.

== Geography ==
According to the United States Census Bureau, the CDP had a total area of 1.550 square miles (4.015 km^{2}), including 1.518 square miles (3.932 km^{2}) of land and 0.032 square miles (0.083 km^{2}) of water (2.07%).

== Demographics ==
Historical population
Census	Pop.	Note	%±
2010	725		—
2020	766		5.7%
Population sources: 2010 2020

Burleigh first appeared as a census designated place in the 2010 U.S. census formed from the deleted Whitesboro-Burleigh CDP.

=== 2020 census ===
Burleigh CDP, New Jersey – Racial and ethnic composition Note: the US Census treats Hispanic/Latino as an ethnic category. This table excludes Latinos from the racial categories and assigns them to a separate category. Hispanics/Latinos may be of any race.
Race / Ethnicity (NH = Non-Hispanic)	Pop 2010	Pop 2020	% 2010	% 2020
White alone (NH)	488	511	67.31%	66.71%
Black or African American alone (NH)	103	80	14.21%	10.44%
Native American or Alaska Native alone (NH)	0	1	0.00%	0.13%
Asian alone (NH)	23	27	3.17%	3.52%
Native Hawaiian or Pacific Islander alone (NH)	1	1	0.14%	0.13%
Other race alone (NH)	0	2	0.00%	0.26%
Mixed race or Multiracial (NH)	11	25	1.52%	3.26%
Hispanic or Latino (any race)	99	119	13.66%	15.54%
Total	725	766	100.00%	100.00%

=== 2010 census ===
The 2010 United States census counted 725 people, 270 households, and 180 families in the CDP. The population density was 477.5 per square mile (184.4/km^{2}). There were 321 housing units at an average density of 211.4 per square mile (81.6/km^{2}). The racial makeup was 72.69% (527) White, 15.59% (113) Black or African American, 0.00% (0) Native American, 3.17% (23) Asian, 0.28% (2) Pacific Islander, 5.66% (41) from other races, and 2.62% (19) from two or more races. Hispanic or Latino of any race were 13.66% (99) of the population.

Of the 270 households, 28.5% had children under the age of 18; 50.0% were married couples living together; 10.4% had a female householder with no husband present and 33.3% were non-families. Of all households, 26.7% were made up of individuals and 9.3% had someone living alone who was 65 years of age or older. The average household size was 2.69 and the average family size was 3.30.

24.8% of the population were under the age of 18, 10.3% from 18 to 24, 21.1% from 25 to 44, 28.7% from 45 to 64, and 15.0% who were 65 years of age or older. The median age was 39.9 years. For every 100 females, the population had 90.3 males. For every 100 females ages 18 and older there were 94.6 males.

== Education ==
It is within the Middle Township School District, which operates Middle Township High School.

Countywide schools include Cape May County Technical High School and Cape May County Special Services School District.

In 1993 Richard Degener of The Press of Atlantic City described what is now the location of the private K-12 school Cape Christian Academy as being in Burleigh. The school is currently in the Cape May Courthouse CDP and not the Burleigh CDP.
