= Dias Creek, New Jersey =

Populated place in Cape May County, New Jersey, US

- Unincorporated community
- Location in Cape May County (Inset: Cape May County in New Jersey) Dias Creek (New Jersey) Dias Creek (the United States)
- Coordinates: 39°5′20″N 74°52′50″W
- Country: United States
- State: New Jersey
- County: Cape May
- Township: Middle
- Elevation: 13 ft (4 m)
- Time zone: UTC-5 (Eastern (EST))
  - Summer (DST): UTC-4 (EDT)
- GNIS feature ID: 875911

Dias Creek (also known as Dyars Creek, Dyer's Creek or Dyers Creek) is an unincorporated community located in Middle Township, in Cape May County, New Jersey, United States. The community is traversed by Route 47, and primarily consists of farmland, woods, and campgrounds for vacationers.

A post office was established in 1850, with Charles K. Holmes as the first postmaster.

== Education ==
Dias Creek is served by the Middle Township School District, which operates Middle Township High School. Countywide schools include Cape May County Technical High School and the Cape May County Special Services School District.

== Wineries ==
- Jessie Creek Winery
