= Swainton, New Jersey =

Populated place in Cape May County, New Jersey, US

- Unincorporated community
- Location in Cape May County (Inset: Cape May County in New Jersey) Swainton (New Jersey) Swainton (the United States)
- Coordinates: 39°07′53″N 74°46′39″W
- Country: United States
- State: New Jersey
- County: Cape May
- Township: Middle
- Elevation: 20 ft (6.1 m)
- ZIP Code: 08210
- Area codes: 609, 640
- GNIS feature ID: 0881036

Swainton is an unincorporated community located within Middle Township in Cape May County, in the U.S. state of New Jersey. U.S. Route 9 and the Garden State Parkway are major roads of Swainton. Avalon is a coastal community directly across from Swainton, connected by Avalon Boulevard.

A post office was established in 1896, with Luther Swain as the first postmaster.

Swainton is home to Union League National Golf Club—a 27-hole golf course offering an 18,000-square-foot (1,700 m^{2}) clubhouse.

== Education ==
Swainton is within the Middle Township School District which operates Middle Township High School.

Countywide schools include Cape May County Technical High School and Cape May County Special Services School District.
