= Cooper University Hospital Cape Regional =

Coordinates: 39.0877°N 74.8169°W

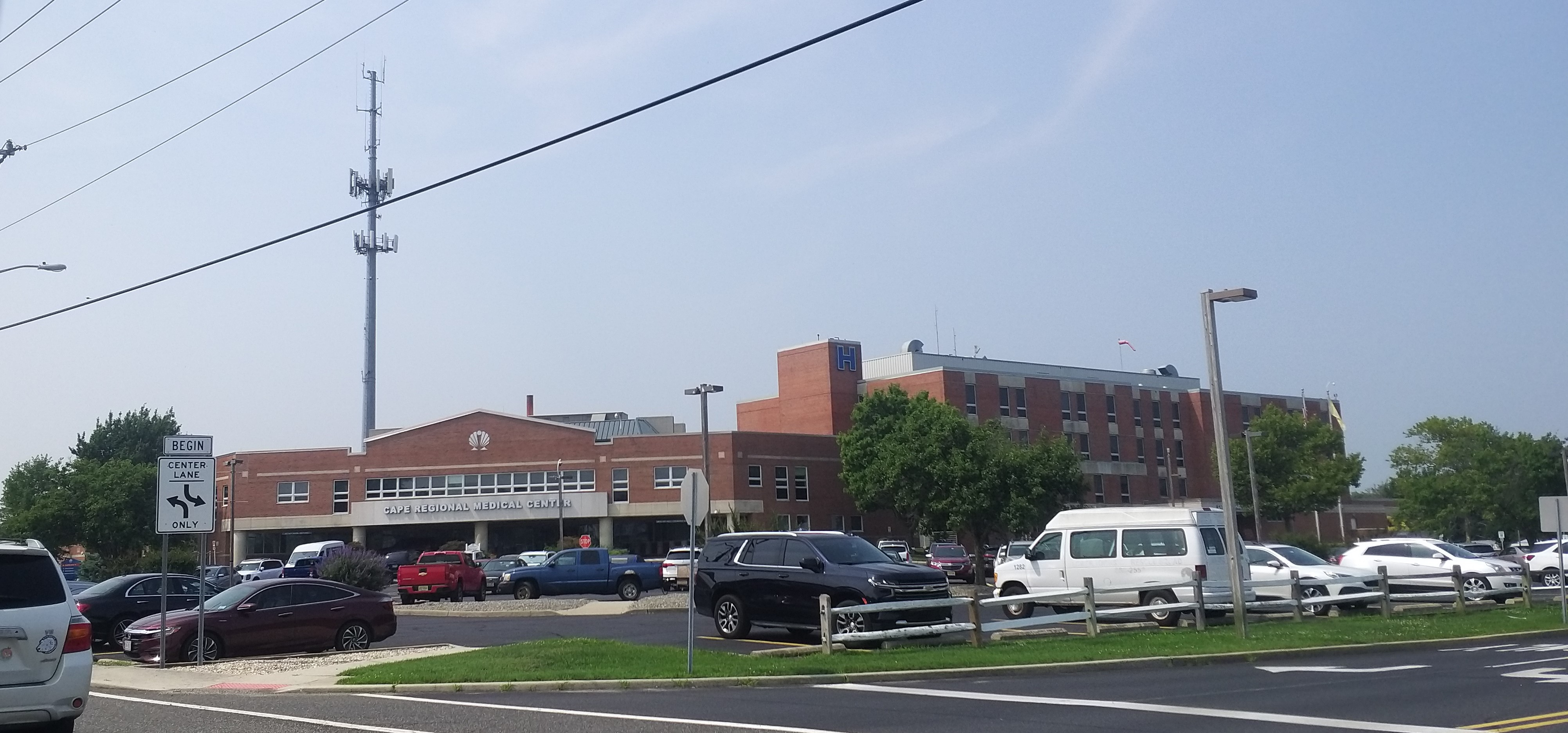

Geography
- Location: Cape May Court House, New Jersey, USA

Organisation
- Type: General Hospital

Services
- Beds: 120

History
- Founded: October 9, 1950 as Burdette Tomlin Memorial Hospital

Links
- Website: www.caperegional.com

Cooper University Hospital Cape Regional, formerly Cape Regional Medical Center, and Burdette Tomlin Memorial Hospital, is located at 2 Stone Harbor Boulevard in the Cape May Court House section of Middle Township, New Jersey, United States. It is the only hospital in Cape May County.

Cape Regional Health System is an integrated healthcare delivery system serving residents and visitors throughout Cape May County. The system includes Cape Regional Medical Center, three urgent care facilities, Cape Regional Physicians Associates with over 50 primary care providers and specialists delivering services in multiple locations throughout Cape May County, the Thomas and Claire Brodesser Jr., Cancer Center, the Jane Osborne Center, Cape Regional Miracles Fitness and numerous freestanding outpatient facilities providing wound care, radiology, lab, and physical therapy services.

Cape Regional Medical Center is accredited by and received the Gold Seal of approval from The Joint Commission.

In December 2022 the Cape Regional Health System stated that it planned to become a part of Cooper University Health. The agreement to do so was signed in April 2023. Cooper took possession of the hospital on July 1, 2024 and gave it its current name.
