= Thomas Beesley Jr. House =

Historic house in New Jersey, United States

- U.S. National Register of Historic Places
- New Jersey Register of Historic Places
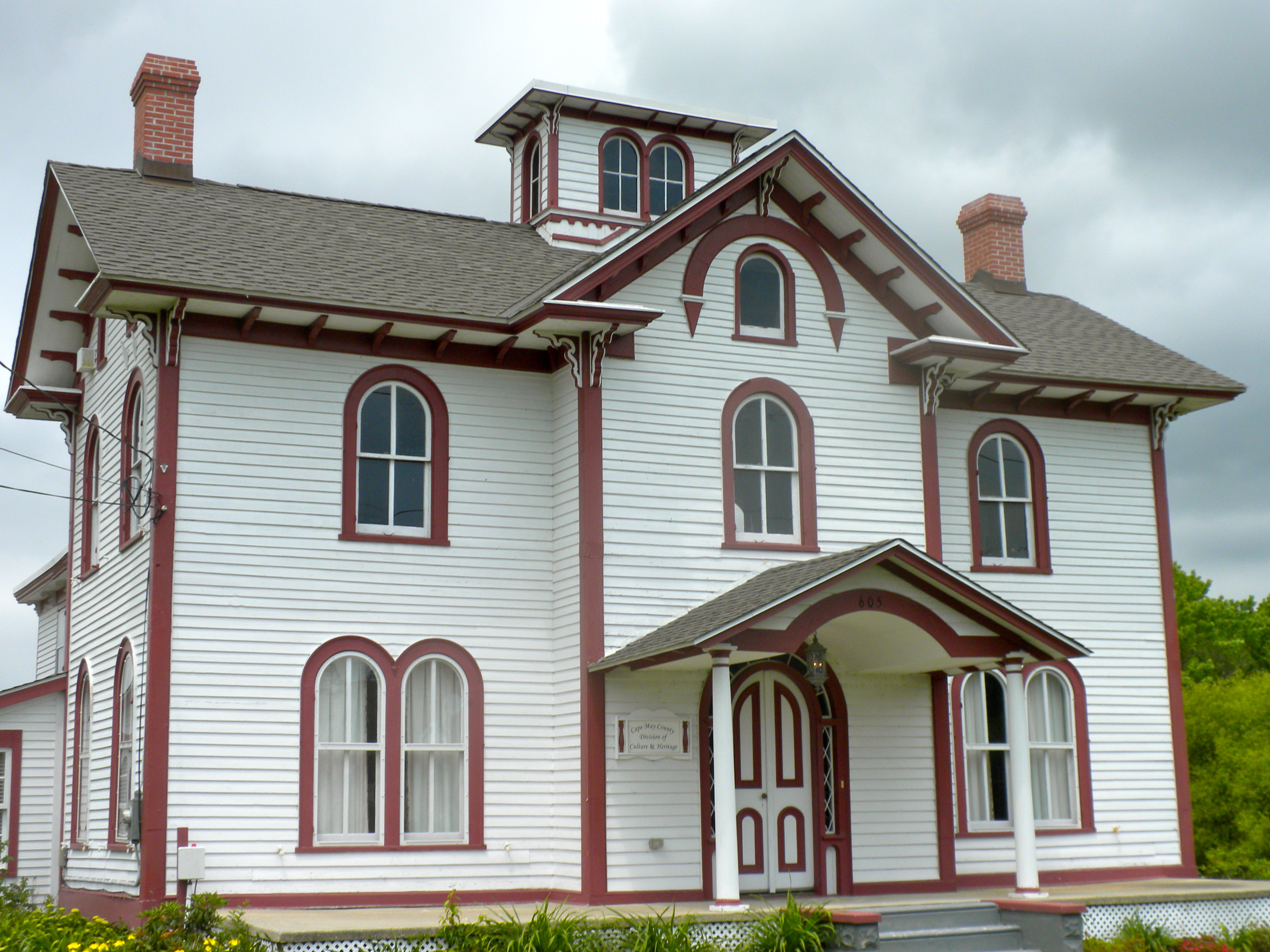
- Thomas Beesley Jr. House in 2010.

- Location within Cape May County, New Jersey Location within New Jersey Location within the United States
- Location: 605 US 9 North, Middle Township, New Jersey
- Coordinates: 39°5′55″N 74°48′50″W
- Area: 2.6 acres (1.1 ha)
- Architectural style: Italianate
- NRHP reference No.: 98000098
- NJRHP No.: 3053

Significant dates
- Added to NRHP: February 12, 1998
- Designated NJRHP: December 22, 1997

Thomas Beesley Jr. House is located in Middle Township, Cape May County, New Jersey, United States. The house was added to the National Register of Historic Places on February 12, 1998.

== See also ==
- National Register of Historic Places listings in Cape May County, New Jersey
