= Jessie Creek Winery =

Winery in New Jersey, USA

Coordinates: 39.100175°N 74.874768°W

- Location: 1 North Delsea Drive (Route 47), Cape May Court House, NJ, USA
- Coordinates: 39.100175 N, 74.874768 W
- Appellation: Outer Coastal Plain AVA
- First vines planted: 2002
- Opened to the public: 2012
- Key people: Bruce Morrison, Kevin Carrigan, Toni Morrison (owner)
- Acres cultivated: 5
- Cases/yr: 1,200 (2013)
- Other attractions: Bed and breakfast
- Distribution: On-site, home shipment
- Tasting: Daily tastings
- Website: http://www.jessiecreekwinery.com/

Jessie Creek Winery is a winery in the Dias Creek section of Middle Township (mailing address is Cape May Court House) in Cape May County, New Jersey. The vineyard was first planted in 2002, and opened to the public in 2012. Jessie Creek has 5 acres of grapes under cultivation, and produces 1,200 cases of wine per year. The winery's name is an amalgamation of Jessie, the name of the former owner's mother, and Dias Creek.

== Wines ==
Jessie Creek Winery is in the Outer Coastal Plain AVA, and produces wines from Cabernet Sauvignon, Chambourcin, Chardonnay, Concord, Merlot and Pinot gris grapes. Jessie Creek also makes fruit wines from cranberries.

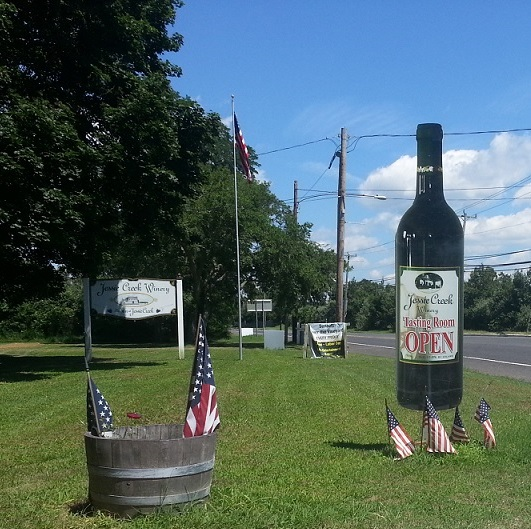
Jessie Creek Winery is located in rural Cape May County, New Jersey.

== Features, licensing and associations ==
Since 2010, the winery has operated a 4-suite bed and breakfast in an 1846 farmhouse. Jessie Creek has a plenary winery license from the New Jersey Division of Alcoholic Beverage Control, which allows it to produce an unrestricted amount of wine, operate up to 15 off-premises sales rooms, and ship up to 12 cases per year to consumers in-state or out-of-state. The winery is a member of the Garden State Wine Growers Association and the Outer Coastal Plain Vineyard Association.

== See also ==
- Alcohol laws of New Jersey
- American wine
- Judgment of Princeton
- List of wineries, breweries, and distilleries in New Jersey
- New Jersey Farm Winery Act
- New Jersey Wine Industry Advisory Council
- New Jersey wine
