= Julius H. Taylor =

American physicist (1914–2011)

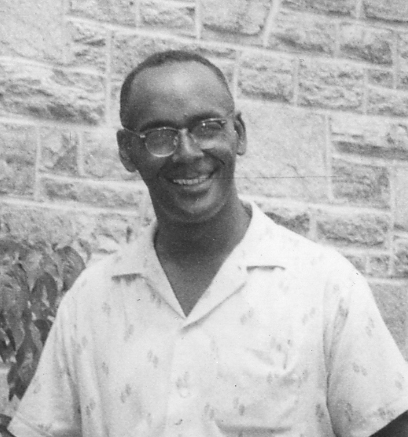
- Taylor at Morgan State University, 1960s
- Born: February 15, 1914; Cape May Court House section of Middle Township, New Jersey, U.S.
- Died: August 27, 2011 (aged 97)
- Education: Lincoln University; University of Pennsylvania
- Scientific career
- Notable students: Conrad Williams; Frederick Oliver; Carl Clark

Julius Henry "Jute" Taylor (15 February 1914 – 27 August 2011) was an American professor emeritus at Morgan State University, where he was also the first chairperson of the department of physics, which he helped to establish at the university. He was the second African-American person to receive a PhD from the University of Pennsylvania in Philadelphia, Pennsylvania, and the first African-American person to receive a PhD in physics at the university. Taylor's research focused on x-ray diffusion, and electrical and optical properties of semi-conductors.

== Early life and education ==
Julius Henry Taylor was born on 15 February 1914 in Cape May, New Jersey, one of six children of Julia Price Taylor and Coleman H. Taylor. His father worked as a brick and concrete mason and his mother worked as a maid at the Cape May Court House and at a drugstore in Cape May. He grew up in the Cape May Court House section of Middle Township, New Jersey and graduated from Middle Township High School in 1932. In high school, he ran track, was a champion pole vaulter, played on the basketball team, and played trumpet.

At the encouragement of his future wife, Patricia Spaulding, he enrolled in and attended Lincoln University in Oxford, Pennsylvania. He graduated from Lincoln, which is a historically Black university, in 1938 with a bachelor's degree in chemistry. During college, he paid tuition by working odd jobs and playing the trumpet at night.

Following his undergraduate studies, Taylor went on to attend the University of Pennsylvania in Philadelphia, Pennsylvania. There, he earned his master's and PhD degrees in physics, and studied with Dr. Gaylord Harnwell. He graduated with a PhD in solid state physics in 1947. He was among the first African-American people to receive a physics PhD, and the second African-American person to receive a PhD from the University of Pennsylvania. Taylor was a Rosenwald Fellow at the University of Pennsylvania.

== Career ==
After earning his doctorate degree, Taylor published physics research under contract with the United States Navy. He then moved on to academia, and joined the faculty of West Virginia State College (now West Virginia State University), in Institute, West Virginia, in 1945 as chairman of the physics department.

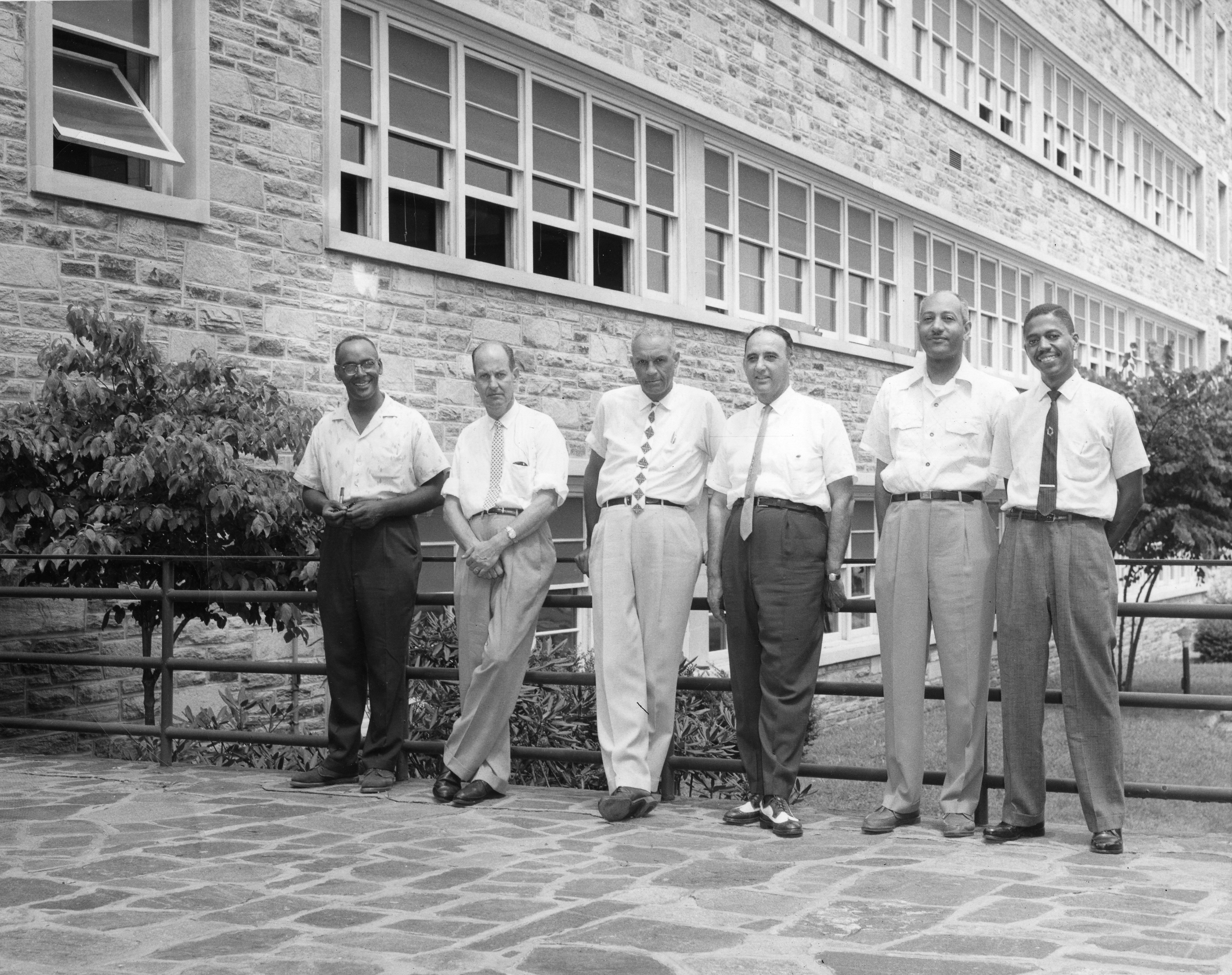
Taylor, left, at Morgan State University, in the 1960s

In 1949, he joined the faculty at Morgan State College (now Morgan State University) in Baltimore, Maryland. Morgan State and West Virginia State are both historically Black universities. Taylor was recruited to Morgan State by then-university president Dr. Martin David Jenkins, who sought to establish a physics department at the university. In 1954, after years of building the physics program, Taylor became the university physics department's first chairman and earned tenure as a professor. Over his career, he guided many students in earning their PhDs in physics, and helped to establish dual-degree programs in engineering in partnerships with engineering schools at New York University, Cornell University and the Rochester Institute of Technology.

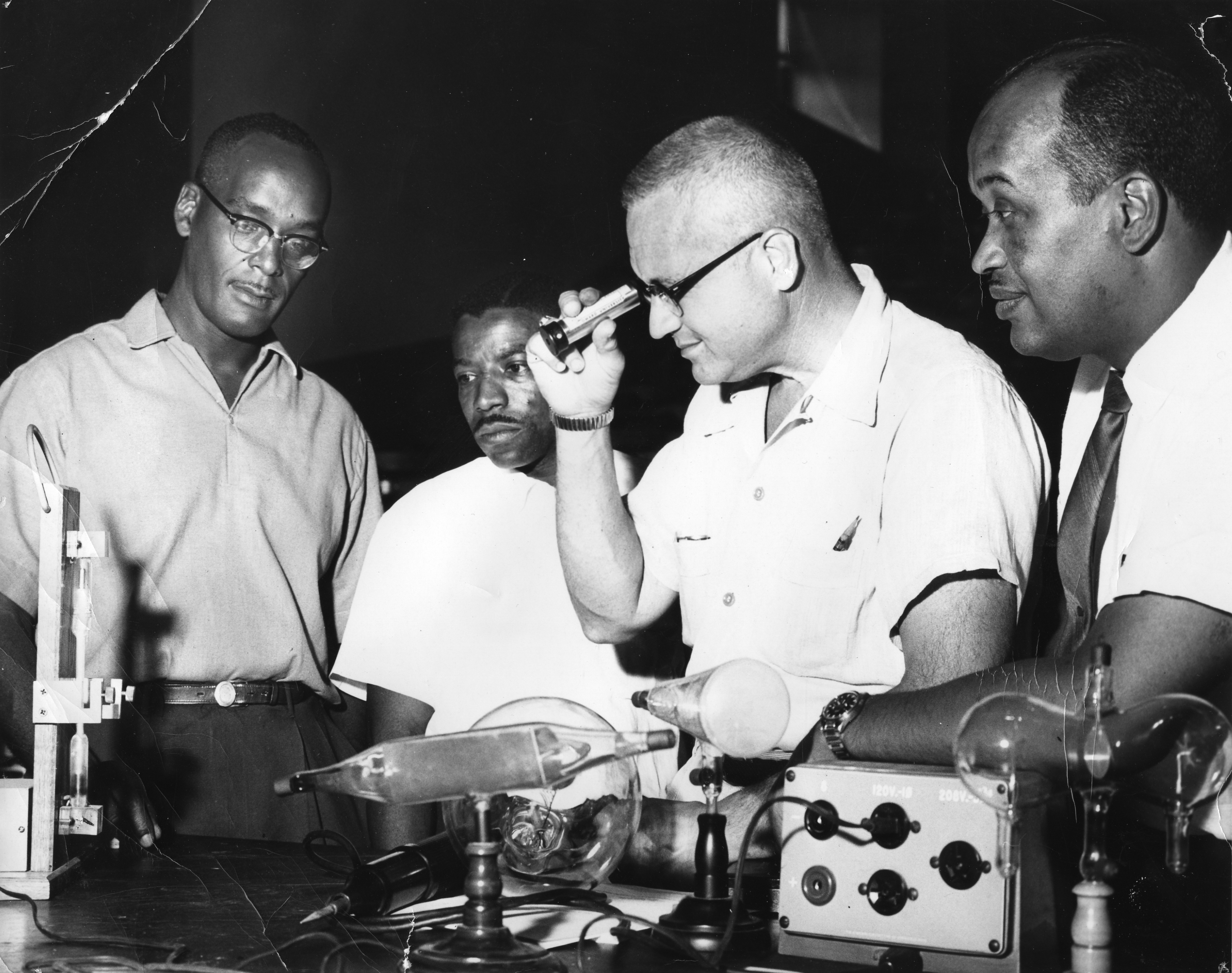
Julius Taylor, left, and Herman Branson of Howard University, right, with two unidentified colleagues in the lab. Photo taken at Morgan State University in the 1960s.

During his career, he also served in various scientific committees and societies, including as a liaison to NASA's Goddard Space Flight Center and the National Science Foundation. He was a member, section representative, and president of the executive committee of the Chesapeake division of the American Association of Physics Teachers. Along with Warren Henry, he helped to start a committee on minorities for the American Physical Society, and started a similarly focused committee for the American Association of Physics Teachers. Beginning in 1955, Taylor worked as an editor, for "The Negro in Science," a book about prominent African-American scientists and their research accomplishments. Its introduction was written by Herman Branson.

He served on the board of the Maryland Academy of Sciences and chaired its Scientific Council, and was appointed as Commissioner of the Maryland Public Broadcasting Commission by then-governor Marvin Mandel in 1975. He also served on the Governor's Science Advisory Council and as president of the Traveler's Aid Society of central Maryland. He was a member of Omega Psi Phi, a historically Black fraternity, and a lifelong member of the NAACP.

Taylor retired in 1987, and lectured at American University in Washington, D.C., in the years before his retirement. In 1987 he also became professor emeritus at Morgan State University and continued teaching there part-time until 1999. There is a Julius H. Taylor Endowed Scholarship Fund named for Taylor at Morgan State University.

Throughout his career and after retirement, Taylor mentored students in the Baltimore Public School system.

== Athletic accomplishments ==
While at Lincoln University, Taylor competed on the track team, and was the first African-American person to compete in pole vaulting at the Penn Relays.

Taylor was an avid golfer throughout his life, playing into his nineties. He started and was the first coach of the Morgan State College golf team, which won the CIAA Championship while he was coach. He was inducted into the African-American Golf Hall of Fame in 2005.

== Personal life ==
Julius Taylor married Patricia Spauling in 1937. They had met while in high school, and had married on Patricia's condition that he attend college and earn a degree. Patricia Spauling worked as an executive assistant to multiple presidents at Morgan State University, and died in 1997. The couple had two children, a son and a daughter.

== Award and honors ==
- Lincoln University and Grambling State University (2004) granted him honorary degrees in science for his contributions to education
- Lincoln University Alumnus of the Year, 1963
- Distinguished Service Citation from the American Association of Physics Teachers, 1976
- Maryland Governor's Citation, 1986
- Technical Achiever Award from the National Technical Association, 2011 (received posthumously)

== Select publications ==
- "Pressure Dependence of Resistance of Germanium," Physics Review, 1950
- "Establishing Physics Programs in Black Colleges," Physics Today, 1976 - with Robert Dixon
