= Middle Township, New Jersey =

Township in Cape May County, New Jersey, US

- Township
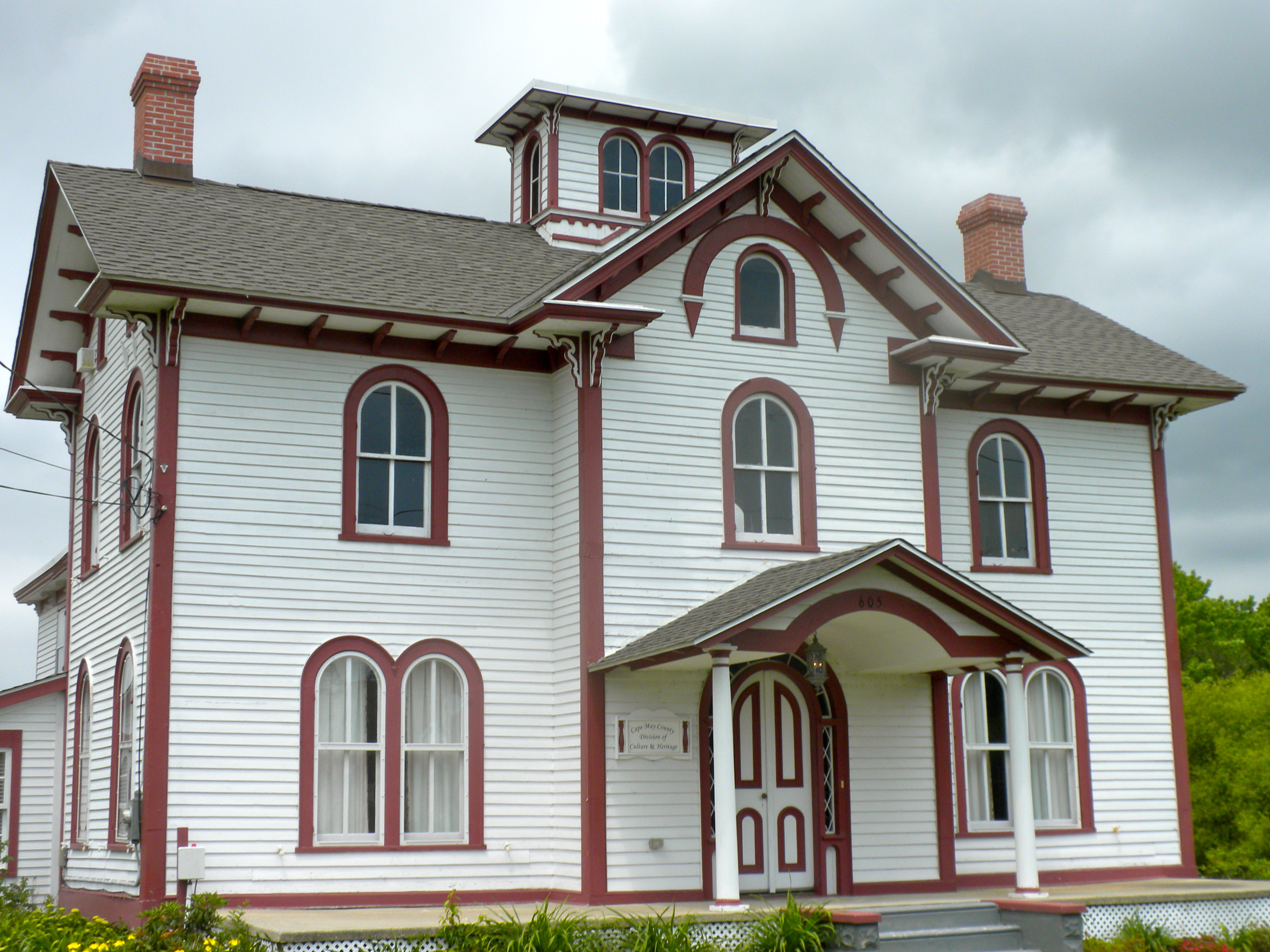
- Thomas Beesley Jr. House in Middle Township, May 2010

- Seal

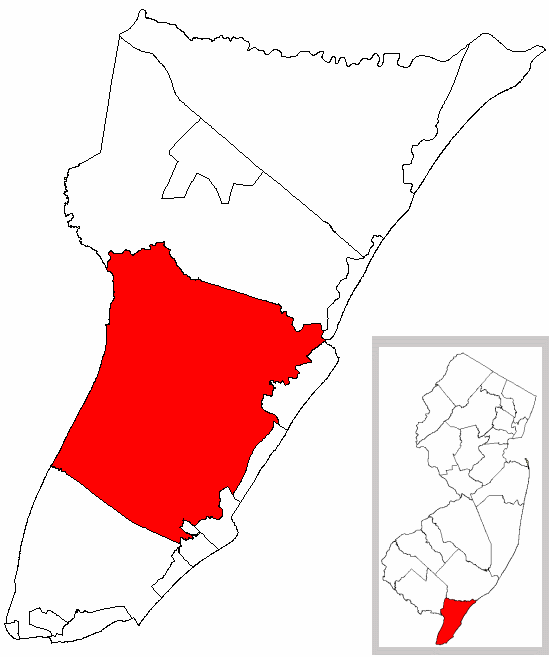
- Location of Middle Township in Cape May County highlighted in red (left). Inset map: Location of Cape May County in New Jersey highlighted in orange (right).

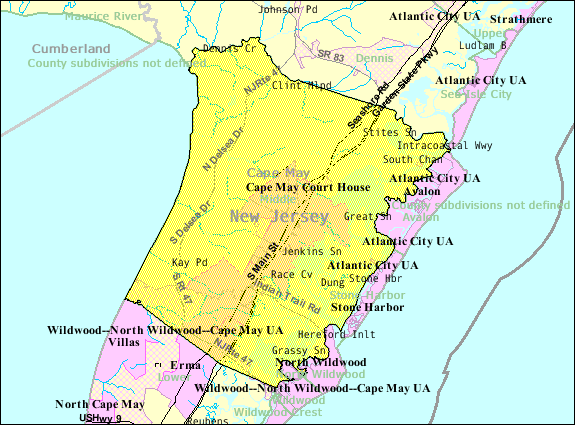
- Census Bureau map of Middle Township, New Jersey

- Location in Cape May County Location in New Jersey Location in the United States
- Coordinates: 39.093265°N 74.838922°W
- Country: United States
- State: New Jersey
- County: Cape May
- Formed: April 2, 1723
- Incorporated: February 21, 1798

Government
  - Type: Township
  - Body: Township Committee
  - Mayor: Timothy C. Donohue (R, term ends December 31, 2023)
  - Administrator: Kimberly Osmundsen
  - Municipal clerk: Kimberly Osmundsen

Area
  - Total: 82.92 sq mi (214.77 km^{2})
  - Land: 70.24 sq mi (181.92 km^{2})
  - Water: 12.69 sq mi (32.86 km^{2}) 15.30%
  - Rank: 8th of 565 in state 1st of 16 in county
- Elevation: 16 ft (4.9 m)

Population (2020)
  - Total: 20,380
  - Estimate (2023): 20,184
  - Rank: 135th of 565 in state 2nd of 16 in county
  - Density: 290.2/sq mi (112.0/km^{2})
  - Rank: 477th of 565 in state 13th of 16 in county
- Time zone: UTC−05:00 (Eastern (EST))
  - Summer (DST): UTC−04:00 (Eastern (EDT))
- ZIP Code: 08210 – Cape May Court House
- Area code: 609
- FIPS code: 3400945810
- GNIS feature ID: 0882045
- Website: www.middletownship.com

Middle Township is a township in Cape May County, in the U.S. state of New Jersey. The township, and all of Cape May County, is part of the Ocean City metropolitan statistical area, and is part of the Philadelphia metropolitan area. As of the 2020 United States census, the township's population was 20,380, its highest decennial census count ever and an increase of 1,469 (+7.8%) from the 2010 census count of 18,911, which in turn had reflected an increase of 2,506 (+15.3%) from the 16,405 counted at the 2000 census. The township's Cape May Court House section is the county seat of Cape May County.

== History ==
Middle Township was formed as a precinct on April 2, 1723, and was incorporated by Township Act of 1798 of the New Jersey Legislature on February 21, 1798 as one of New Jersey's initial group of 104 townships. Portions of the township have been taken to form Anglesea Borough (on June 13, 1885; now North Wildwood), Avalon (April 18, 1892), Wildwood (May 1, 1895), Stone Harbor (April 3, 1914) and West Wildwood (April 21, 1920). The township's name came from its location when Cape May was split into three townships in 1723 at the same time that Lower Township and Upper Township were created.

== Geography ==
According to the U.S. Census Bureau, the township had a total area of 82.92 square miles (214.77 km^{2}), including 70.24 square miles (181.92 km^{2}) of land and 12.69 square miles (32.86 km^{2}) of water (15.30%).

Burleigh (with a 2020 Census population of 766), Cape May Court House (5,573), Rio Grande (3,610), Goshen (400), and Whitesboro (2,300) are unincorporated communities and census-designated places (CDPs) located within Middle Township; Whitesboro and Burleigh had previously been combined for statistical purposes by the Census Bureau as Whitesboro-Burleigh through the 2000 Census. Other unincorporated communities, localities and place names located partially or completely within the township include Del Haven, Dias Creek, Goshen, Goshen Landing, Green Creek, Holly Beach, Mayville, Norburys Landing, Nummytown, Pierces, Pierces Point, Reeds Beach, Shellbed Landing, Swain Point, Swainton, Wildwood Gardens and Wildwood Junction.

The township borders the Cape May County municipalities of Avalon Borough, Dennis Township, Lower Township, North Wildwood City, Sea Isle City, Stone Harbor Borough, Wildwood City and West Wildwood Borough, along with the Atlantic Ocean and Delaware Bay.

Ike's Point is a small, swampy point that protrudes into the western side of Jenkins Sound. Ike's Point is one of five federally-recognized place names in the United States with a possessive apostrophe. When the name was made official in 1944, the United States Board on Geographic Names allowed the apostrophe as the name "would be unrecognizable otherwise".

== Demographics ==
Historical population
Census	Pop.	Note	%±
1810	1,106		—
1820	1,157		4.6%
1830	1,366		18.1%
1840	1,624		18.9%
1850	1,884		16.0%
1860	2,155		14.4%
1870	2,195		1.9%
1880	2,575		17.3%
1890	2,368	*	−8.0%
1900	2,191	*	−7.5%
1910	2,974		35.7%
1920	2,760	*	−7.2%
1930	3,430		24.3%
1940	3,889		13.4%
1950	4,599		18.3%
1960	6,718		46.1%
1970	8,725		29.9%
1980	11,373		30.3%
1990	14,771		29.9%
2000	16,405		11.1%
2010	18,911		15.3%
2020	20,380		7.8%
2023 (est.)	20,184		−1.0%
Population sources:1810–2000 1800–1920 1840 1850–1870; 1850 1870 1880–1890; 1890–1910 1910–1930; 1940–2000 2000; 2010 2020 * = Lost territory in previous decade

=== 2010 census ===
The 2010 United States census counted 18,911 people, 7,256 households, and 4,934 families in the township. The population density was 268.9 per square mile (103.8/km^{2}). There were 9,296 housing units at an average density of 132.2 per square mile (51.0/km^{2}). The racial makeup was 83.11% (15,716) White, 10.41% (1,969) Black or African American, 0.18% (34) Native American, 1.79% (339) Asian, 0.05% (9) Pacific Islander, 1.97% (373) from other races, and 2.49% (471) from two or more races. Hispanic or Latino of any race were 5.09% (962) of the population.

Of the 7,256 households, 24.7% had children under the age of 18; 50.4% were married couples living together; 12.5% had a female householder with no husband present and 32.0% were non-families. Of all households, 26.2% were made up of individuals and 12.3% had someone living alone who was 65 years of age or older. The average household size was 2.49 and the average family size was 3.00.

20.9% of the population were under the age of 18, 7.7% from 18 to 24, 21.9% from 25 to 44, 30.5% from 45 to 64, and 19.0% who were 65 years of age or older. The median age was 44.6 years. For every 100 females, the population had 94.6 males. For every 100 females ages 18 and older there were 91.7 males.

The Census Bureau's 2006–2010 American Community Survey showed that (in 2010 inflation-adjusted dollars) median household income was $57,244 (with a margin of error of +/− $6,225) and the median family income was $66,451 (+/− $6,897). Males had a median income of $49,645 (+/− $5,272) versus $48,029 (+/− $5,201) for females. The per capita income for the township was $28,087 (+/− $1,866). About 4.4% of families and 6.2% of the population were below the poverty line, including 6.4% of those under age 18 and 5.6% of those age 65 or over.

=== 2000 census ===
As of the 2000 census, there were 16,405 people, 6,009 households, and 4,218 families residing in the township. The population density was 230.2 inhabitants per square mile (88.9/km^{2}). There were 7,510 housing units at an average density of 105.4 per square mile (40.7/km^{2}). The racial makeup of the township was 85.21% White, 10.86% African American, 0.23% Native American, 1.44% Asian, 0.02% Pacific Islander, 0.66% from other races, and 1.58% from two or more races. Hispanic or Latino of any race were 2.12% of the population.

There were 6,009 households, out of which 31.5% had children under the age of 18 living with them, 53.9% were married couples living together, 12.0% had a female householder with no husband present, and 29.8% were non-families. 24.6% of all households were made up of individuals, and 11.9% had someone living alone who was 65 years of age or older. The average household size was 2.58 and the average family size was 3.08.

In the township, the population was spread out, with 24.7% under the age of 18, 6.5% from 18 to 24, 27.8% from 25 to 44, 23.2% from 45 to 64, and 17.8% who were 65 years of age or older. The median age was 40 years. For every 100 females, there were 93.1 males. For every 100 females age 18 and over, there were 88.5 males.

The median income for a household in the township was $41,533, and the median income for a family was $49,030. Males had a median income of $37,531 versus $27,166 for females. The per capita income for the township was $19,805. About 8.6% of families and 10.2% of the population were below the poverty line, including 14.5% of those under age 18 and 10.6% of those age 65 or over.

== Government ==
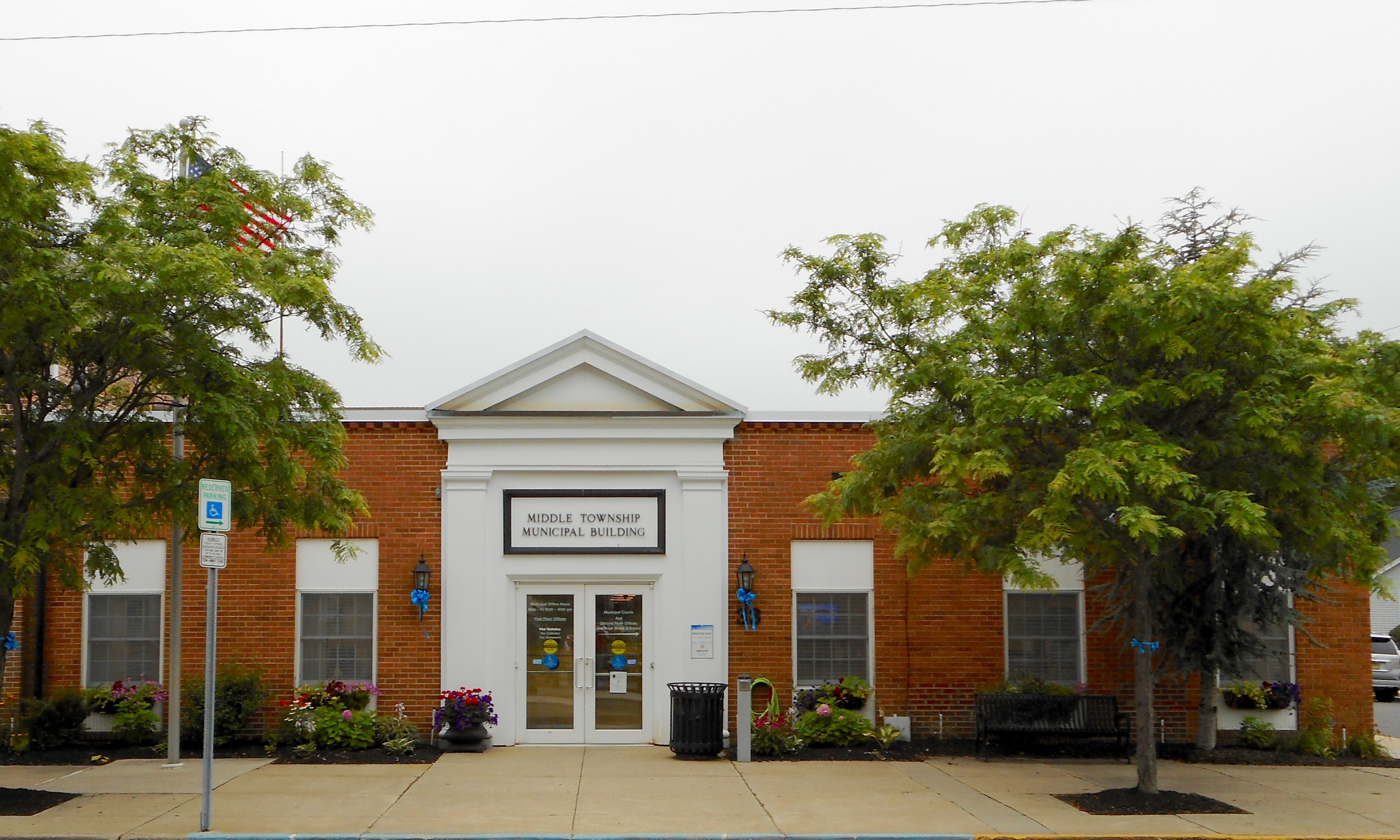
Middle Township Municipal Building in Cape May Court House

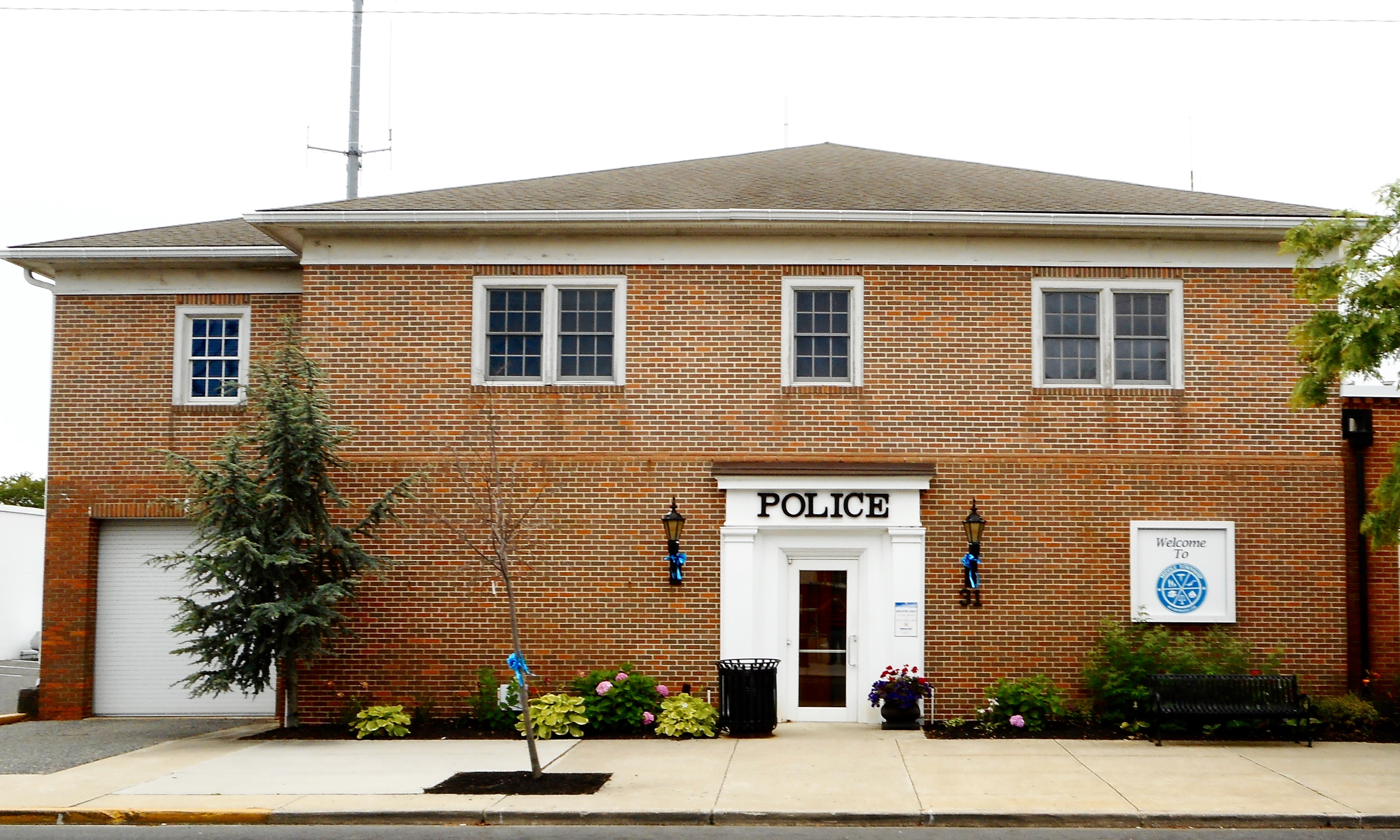
Police Department in Cape May Court House

=== Local government ===
Middle Township is governed under the Township form of government, one of 141 municipalities (of the 564) statewide that use this form, the second-most commonly used form of government in the state. The governing body is comprised of a three-member Township Committee, whose members are elected directly by the voters at-large in partisan elections to serve three-year terms of office on a staggered basis, with one seat coming up for election each year as part of the November general election in a three-year cycle. At an annual reorganization meeting, the Township Committee selects one of its members to serve as Mayor and another as Deputy Mayor.

As of 2023, the Township Committee consists of Mayor Timothy C. Donohue (R, term on committee and as mayor ends December 31, 2023), Deputy Mayor Theron "Ike" Gandy (R, term on committee ends 2024; term as deputy mayor ends 2023) and James Norris (R, 2025).

=== Federal, state, and county representation ===
Middle Township is located in the 2nd Congressional District and is part of New Jersey's 1st state legislative district.

For the 119th United States Congress, New Jersey's 2nd congressional district is represented by Jeff Van Drew (R, Dennis Township). New Jersey is represented in the United States Senate by Democrats Cory Booker (Newark, term ends 2027) and Andy Kim (Moorestown, term ends 2031).

For the 2026–2027 session, the 1st legislative district of the New Jersey Legislature is represented in the State Senate by Mike Testa (R, Vineland) and in the General Assembly by Antwan McClellan (R, Ocean City) and Erik K. Simonsen (R, Lower Township).

Cape May County is governed by a five-person Board of County Commissioners whose members are elected at-large on a partisan basis to three-year terms of office on a staggered basis, with either one or two seats coming up for election each year; At an annual reorganization held each January, the commissioners select one member to serve as director and another to serve as vice-director. As of 2026, Cape May County's Commissioners are Director Leonard C. Desiderio (R, Sea Isle City, term as commissioner ends December 31, 2027; term as director ends 2026), Vice-Director Andrew Bulakowski (R, Lower Township; term as commissioner ends 2028; term as vice-director ends 2026). Robert Barr (R, Ocean City; 2028) and Will Morey (R, Wildwood Crest; 2026), with one seat expiring in December 2026 vacant after Melanie Collette resigned from office in March 2026. The county's constitutional officers are Clerk Rita Marie Rothberg (R, Ocean City; 2030), Sheriff Robert Nolan (R, Lower Township; 2026) and Surrogate E. Marie Hayes (R, Ocean City; 2028).

=== Politics ===
As of March 2011, there were a total of 12,114 registered voters in Middle Township, of which 3,041 (25.1%) were registered as Democrats, 3,823 (31.6%) were registered as Republicans and 5,244 (43.3%) were registered as Unaffiliated. There were 6 voters registered as Libertarians or Greens.

Gubernatorial election results for Middle Township
Year	Republican		Democratic		Third party(ies)	
Year	No.	%	No.	%	No.	%
2025	4,810	57.50%	3,509	41.95%	46	0.55%
2021	4,613	63.28%	2,622	35.97%	55	0.75%
2017	2,916	52.00%	2,565	45.74%	127	2.26%
2013	3,856	67.52%	1,757	30.77%	98	1.72%
2009	3,024	49.52%	2,593	42.46%	490	8.02%
2005	2,315	46.60%	2,455	49.42%	198	3.99%

In the 2012 presidential election, Republican Mitt Romney received 49.6% of the vote (4,328 cast), ahead of Democrat Barack Obama with 49.3% (4,299 votes), and other candidates with 1.1% (93 votes), among the 8,796 ballots cast by the township's 12,717 registered voters (76 ballots were spoiled), for a turnout of 69.2%. In the 2008 presidential election, Republican John McCain received 49.5% of the vote (4,483 cast), ahead of Democrat Barack Obama, who received 48.4% (4,389 votes), with 9,059 ballots cast among the township's 11,493 registered voters, for a turnout of 78.8%. In the 2004 presidential election, Republican George W. Bush received 54.0% of the vote (4,391 ballots cast), outpolling Democrat John Kerry, who received around 44.1% (3,586 votes), with 8,133 ballots cast among the township's 10,977 registered voters, for a turnout percentage of 74.1.

Presidential elections results
Year	Republican	Democratic
2024	59.1% 6,388	39.0% 4,221
2020	57.1% 6,437	41.4% 4,664
2016	56.3% 5,175	39.7% 3,645
2012	49.6% 4,328	49.3% 4,299
2008	49.5% 4,483	48.4% 4,389
2004	54.0% 4,391	44.1% 3,586

In the 2013 gubernatorial election, Republican Chris Christie received 67.5% of the vote (3,856 cast), ahead of Democrat Barbara Buono with 30.8% (1,757 votes), and other candidates with 1.7% (98 votes), among the 5,911 ballots cast by the township's 12,651 registered voters (200 ballots were spoiled), for a turnout of 46.7%. In the 2009 gubernatorial election, Republican Chris Christie received 48.4% of the vote (3,024 ballots cast), ahead of both Democrat Jon Corzine with 41.5% (2,593 votes) and Independent Chris Daggett with 6.1% (381 votes), with 6,244 ballots cast among the township's 12,320 registered voters, yielding a 50.7% turnout.

United States Senate election results for Middle Township1
Year	Republican		Democratic		Third party(ies)	
Year	No.	%	No.	%	No.	%
2024	6,004	59.71%	3,899	38.77%	153	1.52%
2018	4,560	59.49%	2,799	36.52%	306	3.99%
2012	3,705	46.86%	4,046	51.18%	155	1.96%
2006	3,029	52.78%	2,592	45.16%	118	2.06%

United States Senate election results for Middle Township2
Year	Republican		Democratic		Third party(ies)	
Year	No.	%	No.	%	No.	%
2020	6,010	55.89%	4,515	41.99%	228	2.12%
2014	2,683	53.74%	2,237	44.80%	73	1.46%
2013	1,604	53.61%	1,346	44.99%	42	1.40%
2008	3,729	46.53%	4,112	51.31%	173	2.16%

== Education ==
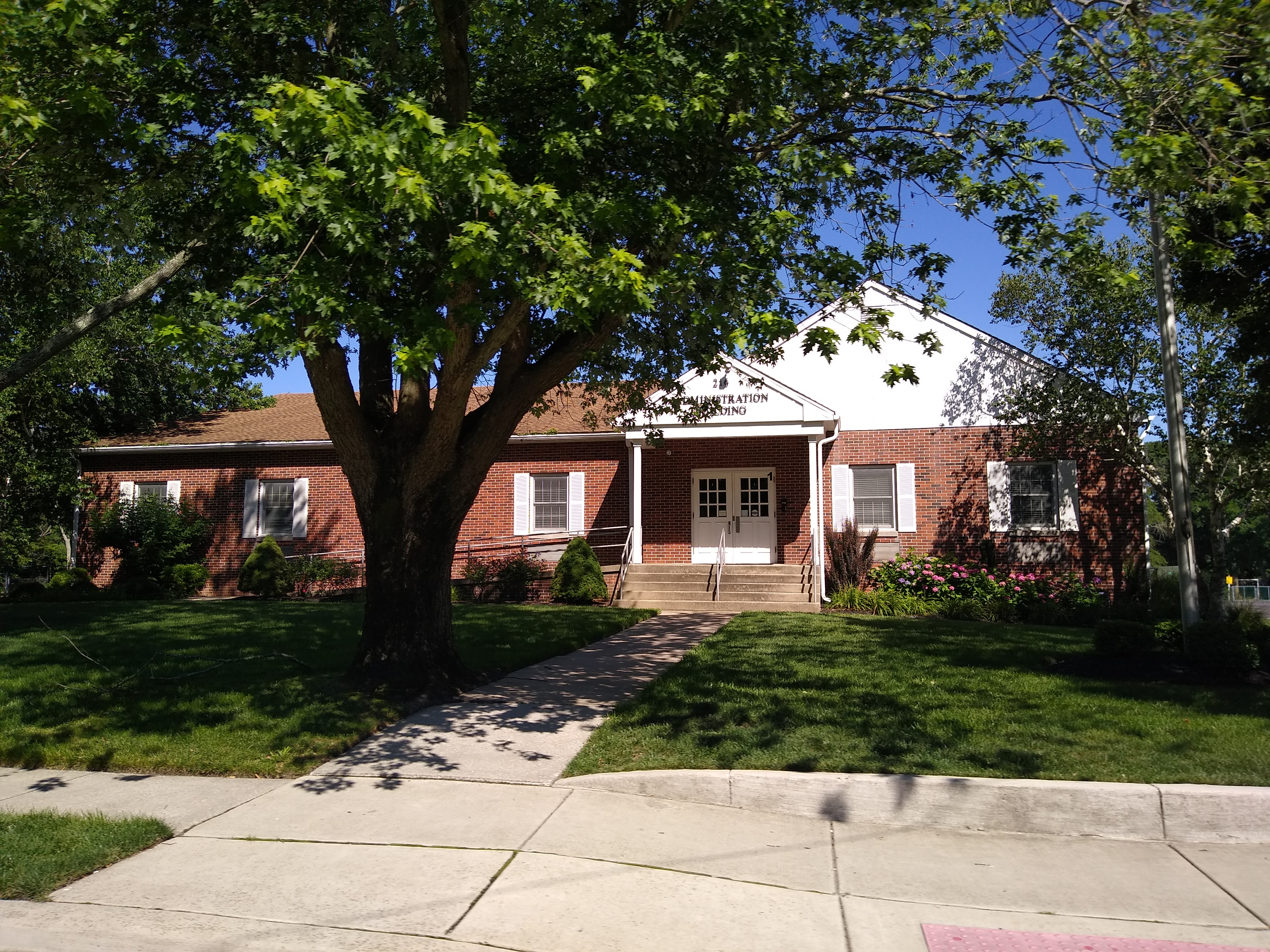
Middle Township Public Schools headquarters

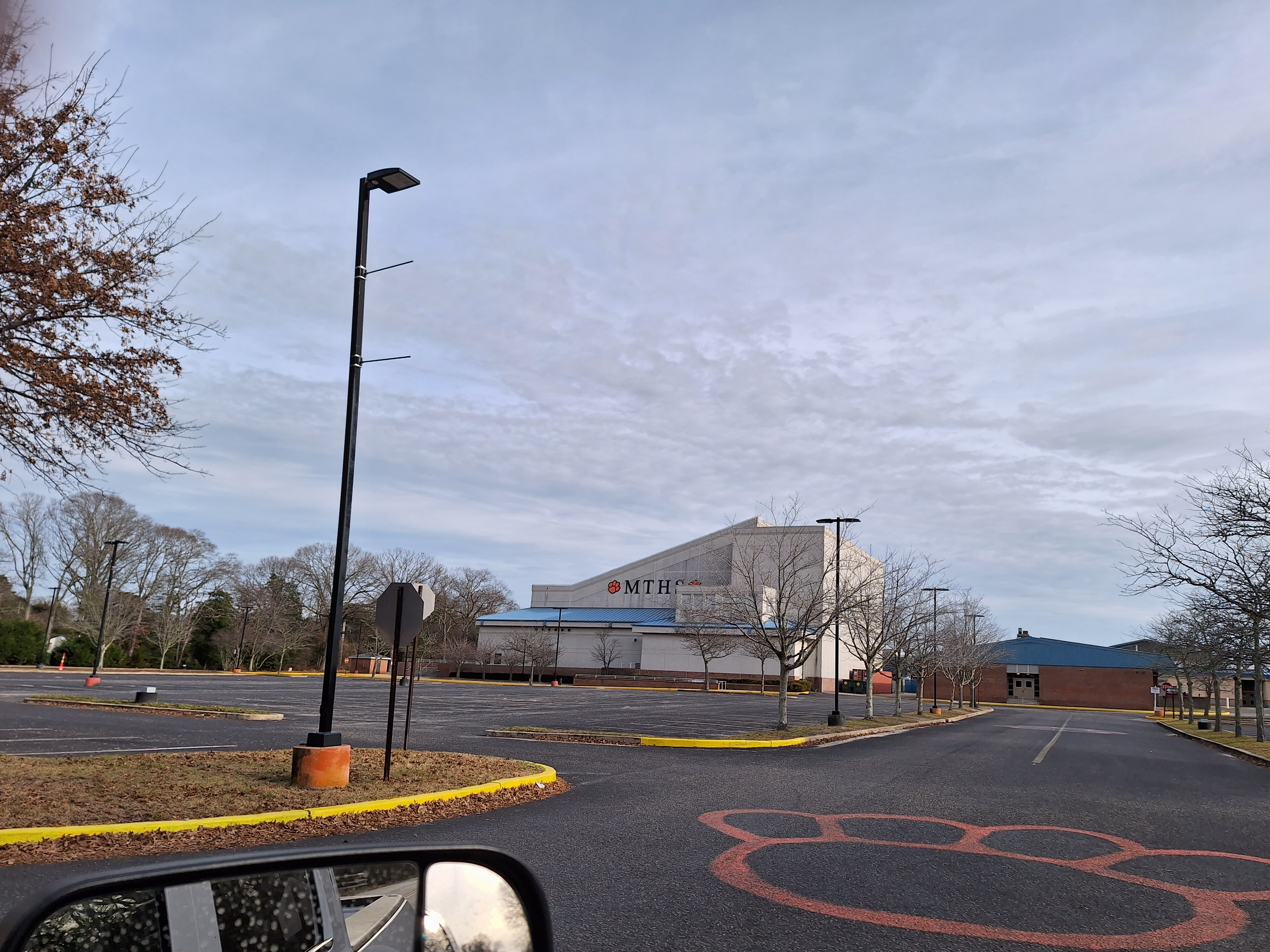
Middle Township High School

The Middle Township Public Schools serve students in pre-kindergarten through twelfth grade. As of the 2023–24 school year, the district, comprised of four schools, had an enrollment of 2,672 students and 222.2 classroom teachers (on an FTE basis), for a student–teacher ratio of 12.0:1. Schools in the district (with 2023–24 enrollment data from the National Center for Education Statistics) are Middle Township Elementary School #1 with 660 students in grades PreK–2, Middle Township Elementary School #2 with 532 students in grades 3–5, Middle Township Middle School with 547 students in grades 6–8 and Middle Township High School with 825 students in grades 9–12. Students from Avalon, Dennis Township, Stone Harbor and Woodbine attend the district's high school as part of sending/receiving relationships.

Students are also eligible to attend Cape May County Technical High School in Cape May Court House, which serves students from the entire county in its comprehensive and vocational programs, which are offered without charge to students who are county residents. Special needs students may be referred to Cape May County Special Services School District in Cape May Court House.

There is a private Christian K–12 school in Middle Township, Cape Christian Academy. It is in the CMCH CDP and has a CMCH postal address. Richard Degener of the Press of Atlantic City described it as being in Burleigh.

The Roman Catholic Diocese of Camden operates Bishop McHugh Regional School, a Catholic K–8 school, in Ocean View, Dennis Township, which has a Cape May Courthouse postal address. It is supported by four parishes in Cape May County including the Cape May Courthouse Church. The sole Catholic high school program in Cape May County is in Wildwood Catholic Academy (K–12) in North Wildwood, which also operates under the Camden Diocese.

Cape May County Library has its Cape May Court House branch.

== Infrastructure ==
=== Transportation ===
==== Roads and highways ====
As of May 2010, the township had a total of 178.86 miles (287.85 km) of roadways, of which 96.20 miles (154.82 km) were maintained by the municipality, 42.23 miles (67.96 km) by Cape May County, 29.06 miles (46.77 km) by the New Jersey Department of Transportation and 11.37 miles (18.30 km) by the New Jersey Turnpike Authority.

The Garden State Parkway runs for more than 11.3 miles (18.2 km) as the main highway serving Middle Township. U.S. Route 9, Route 47 and Route 147 are other significant roadways within Middle Township.

==== Public transportation ====
NJ Transit offers bus service between Cape May and Philadelphia on the 313, 315 and 316 (seasonal only) routes, between Cape May and the Port Authority Bus Terminal in Midtown Manhattan on the 319, between Rio Grande and Wildwood on the 510 (seasonal only), and between Cape May and Atlantic City on the 552 route.

The Great American Trolley Company operates trolley service from North Wildwood and Wildwood to shopping centers in Rio Grande on Mondays through Fridays in the summer months.

=== Health care ===
Cooper University Hospital Cape Regional, located in Cape May Court House, is the only hospital in Cape May County. It was known as Burdette Tomlin Memorial Hospital until April 2007, when it was renamed Cape Regional Medical Center, which was used until June 2024. In May 2021, The Claire C. Brodesser Surgery Center opened to patients needing ambulatory surgery and endoscopy services.

== Wineries ==
- Jessie Creek Winery
- Natali Vineyards

== Notable people ==
People who were born in, residents of, or otherwise closely associated with Middle Township include:

- Bob Andrzejczak (born 1986), politician who represented the 1st Legislative District in the New Jersey General Assembly from 2013 to 2019 and in the New Jersey Senate in 2019
- Kevin Bramble (born 1972), disabled ski racer, freeskier, and mono-ski designer and builder
- Anthony Cafiero (1900–1982), politician who served as a member of the New Jersey Senate from 1949 to 1953 and as a judge in New Jersey Superior Court
- Maurice Catarcio (1929–2005), professional wrestler for the World Wrestling Federation and record holder in The Guinness Book of World Records
- Daniel Cohen (1936–2018), children's writer
- Joe Fala (born 1997), soccer player who plays as a defender for New York Red Bulls II in the USL Championship
- Stedman Graham (born 1951), educator, author, businessman, speaker and long-time partner of media mogul Oprah Winfrey
- LaMarr Greer (born 1976), retired basketball player who played in the United States Basketball League and the International Basketball League
- Matthew Maher (born 1984), retired soccer defender, who was sentenced to five and a half years in prison for first degree aggravated manslaughter and drunken driving
- Matthew Szczur (born 1989), centerfielder for the Chicago Cubs
- Julius H. Taylor (1914–2011), professor emeritus at Morgan State University who was chairperson of the department of physics
- Andrew J. Tomlin (1845–1906), awarded the Medal of Honor for his actions in the Civil War
