= Kevin Bramble =

American alpine skier (born 1972)

Medal record

Men's para-alpine skiing

Representing the United States

Winter Paralympics
Gold medal – first place	2002 Salt Lake City	Downhill
Gold medal – first place	2006 Torino	Downhill

Winter X Games
Bronze medal – third place	2016 Aspen	Mono Skier X

Kevin Bramble (born September 19, 1972) is an American disabled ski racer, freeskier, and monoski designer/builder. He competes as a monoskier in the LW 12-1 class and is known as a "speed specialist," preferring to compete in downhill and super G.

== Career ==
Bramble grew up in the Cape May Court House section of Middle Township, New Jersey, and graduated from Middle Township High School.

He began skiing recreationally in Pennsylvania's Pocono Mountains at age 11. By 1994, Bramble was a serious snowboarder and occasional skier living in the Lake Tahoe area when he became paralyzed in a snowboarding accident. He soon taught himself to monoski and moved to Winter Park, Colorado, where he joined the Winter Park Disabled Ski Team. He returned to the Tahoe area soon after, settling in Truckee, California, but having acquired the racing skills that he needed. He was named to the U.S. Disabled Ski Team in 1998 after winning the super G at that year's U.S. Disabled Alpine Championships.

Since 1998, Bramble has had an on-and-off relationship with the U.S. Ski Team, often competing in World Cup competition but eschewing traditional race training in favor of freeskiing with friends at Squaw Valley, California. His greatest success has come in downhill, beginning with a World Cup win on the Paralympic course at Snowbasin, Utah in 2001. A year later, Bramble was the odds-on favorite to win the downhill gold at the 2002 Winter Paralympics in Salt Lake City, Utah, and he did not disappoint, beating teammate Chris Devlin-Young by just 0.17 seconds. Two years later at the Disabled Alpine Skiing World Championships in Wildschönau, Austria, he again won gold in downhill, defeating Germany's Thomas Mayer by an astonishing 1.44 seconds. Two years later at the 2006 Winter Paralympics in Torino, Italy, the pressure was on Bramble to win his third straight major world downhill championship. Once again Bramble proved his dominance, again knocking teammate Devlin-Young down to the silver-medal position with a wild run that won him the gold by nearly a full second.

Bramble has made a reputation for himself not only as a racer but also as a freeskier. One of the first people to take a monoski into terrain parks, halfpipes, and extreme terrain, Bramble and teammate Monte Meier are featured in Warren Miller's 2006 ski movie Off the Grid.

== Monoski manufacturer ==
After several years skiing in a monoski he had purchased, Bramble decided to design and build his own. After several prototypes resulted in a model he was satisfied with, he began hand-building monoskis for friends and teammates, and Kevin Bramble Goodz (KBG) was born. After operating the business out of his garage in Truckee, California, for several years, Bramble relocated back to his home town of Cape May Court House, New Jersey, in 2004 so his family could help him run the business. Seven out of the 10 current U.S. Disabled Ski Team monoskiers ski in KBG monoskis. Bramble also builds his own unique, three-wheeled wheelchairs and has plans to launch a downhill mountain-bike wheelchair soon.
