= Southern Cape Christian School =

Private school in Cape May County, New Jersey, US

Location
- 10 Oyster Road; Cape May Court House, Cape May County, New Jersey 08210; United States; 39.05634°N 74.84275°W

Information
- Type: Christian school
- Established: 1991
- NCES School ID: AA000218
- Administrator: Katie Pierson
- Faculty: 9.1 FTEs
- Grades: PreK-8
- Enrollment: 59 (plus 27 in PreK, as of 2021–22)
- Student to teacher ratio: 6.5:1
- Website: www.southerncapechristianschool.com

Southern Cape Christian School (formerly Cape Christian Academy) is a private Christian school serving students in preschool to eighth grade, located in Middle Township, in Cape May County, in the U.S. state of New Jersey. It has a Cape May Court House postal address and is located within the Cape May Court House census-designated place. Richard Degener of The Press of Atlantic City described it as being in Burleigh. Its campus has 6.5 acres (2.6 ha) of area.

As of the 2021–22 school year, the school had an enrollment of 59 students (plus 27 in PreK) and 9.1 classroom teachers (on an FTE basis), for a student–teacher ratio of 6.5:1. The school's student body was 71.2% (42) White, 3.4% (2) Black, 5.1% (3) Asian, 10.2% (6) Hispanic and 6.8% (4) two or more races, 3.4% (2) American Indian / Alaska Native and 0% (0) Native Hawaiian / Pacific Islander.

== History ==
Southern Cape Christian School was established as Cape Christian Academy in 1991 as part of the merger of Cape May County Christian School (CMCCS) and South Cape Christian Academy. The former opened, initially with grades Kindergarten through 2, either in 1976, or in September 1977, with an initial enrollment of 45–50. Its founder was Betty Gillingham. South Cape opened after CMCCS opened. South Cape, at Covenant Bible Church, was located in an area of Lower Township with a North Cape May postal address, though as of 2010 it was outside of the North Cape May CDP. Robert Thomson (died 1988), who is considered to be another co-founder of Cape Christian, served on the board of directors of one of the predecessor schools.

The initial enrollment was 300. Originally, the merged school used rented facilities. The Kindergarten through grade 3 and 8-12 buildings were rented from Faith Fellowship Chapel and were located in Middle Township. The K-3 building had a total of 10,000 square feet (930 m^{2}) of area and also had offices. First Assembly of God Church in Lower Township housed some of the Kindergarten and first grade classes. Covenant Bible Church housed grades 4–7. By 1993 it had 380 students.

In 1993, the school bought its current campus from Faith Fellowship Chapel. The purchase included the K-3 building, but not the 8-12 building. By 1994, it had two campuses. The student count that year was almost 350. In 1995, the student count was about 350, and it still had two campuses. At some point, the school ended its high school program.

In 2024, Cape Christian added a few more staff members, including a new teacher and a music teacher with an advanced degree (Master of Divinity) and several albums of original music JJ Beauvais. In 2025, Cape Christian Academy appointed a new administrator who served as a lieutenant in the US Coast Guard. The school underwent a complete rebrand/redesign, which includes a slightly different name and also a new mascot. On August 1, 2025, Cape Christian Academy officially rebranded to Southern Cape Christian School.

In 2026 it was acquired by Westminster Christian Academy, a K-12 school in Ocean City, New Jersey. At the time, Westminster Christian had about 100 students and Southern Cape Christian had about 45 students. Westminster Christian chose to use the Southern Cape Christian campus as its combined campus. This meant that the Southern Cape Christian campus was to get its high school operations back.
