= Stedman Graham =

American businessman and author (born 1951)

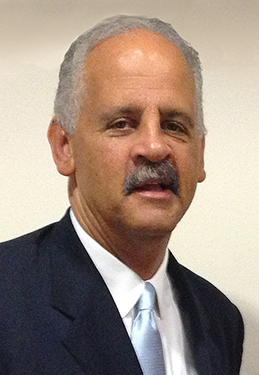
- Graham in 2014
- Born: March 6, 1951 (age 75); Whitesboro, New Jersey, U.S.
- Education: Hardin-Simmons University (BSW); Ball State University (MEd)
- Occupations: Businessman, author
- Spouse: Glenda Graham (m. 1974, div. 1980)
- Partner: Oprah Winfrey (1986–present)
- Children: 1

Stedman Graham Jr. (born March 6, 1951) is an American businessman and author. He is the long-term partner of Oprah Winfrey.

== Early life and education ==
Graham was born on March 6, 1951, in the Whitesboro section of Middle Township, New Jersey, the son of Mary Jacobs Graham and Stedman Graham Sr. He is one of six children. He received a bachelor's degree in social work from Hardin-Simmons University in 1974 and a master's degree in education from Ball State University in 1979. Graham played college basketball at Hardin-Simmons, and roomed with future NBA basketball player Harvey Catchings.

== Business career ==
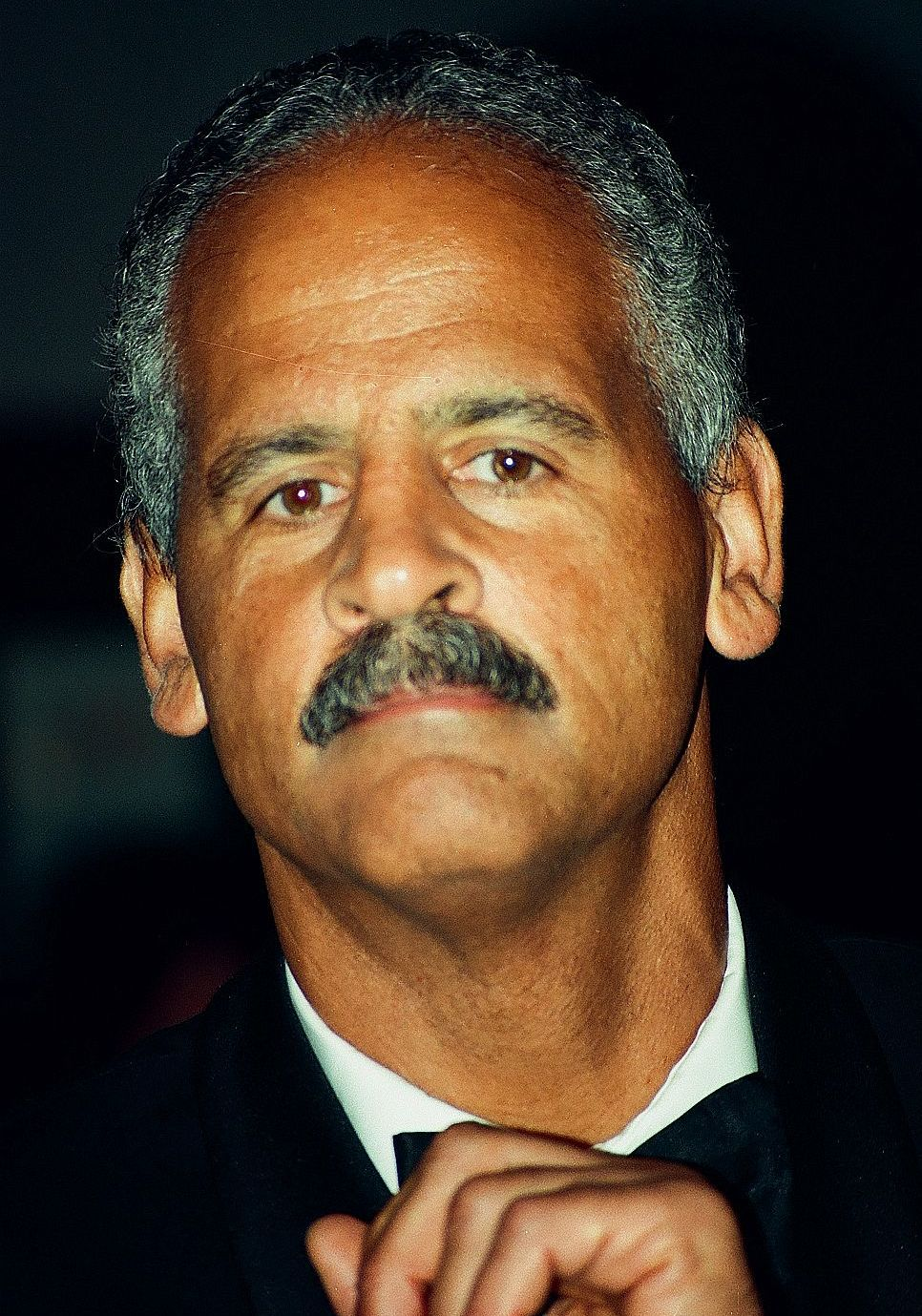
Graham in 1999

Graham eventually moved to High Point, North Carolina, to establish himself in public relations. At B & C Associates, Graham worked on behalf of Black causes and worked with many distinguished clients, including author Maya Angelou and South African activist Winnie Mandela.

He is also founder of Chicago's AAD (formerly, Athletes Against Drugs), a non-profit organization that provides services to youth and has awarded over $1.5 million in scholarships since its founding in 1985. It also arranged for sports figures to educate children about substance abuse.

He is a member of the Indiana Broadcasting Hall of Fame.

In 1988, Graham created S. Graham & Associates, a Chicago-based corporate and educational marketing and consulting firm.

Graham was an adjunct professor at Full Sail University. In 2024 Stedman Graham was appointed as an ambassador for the Stimulus Awards.

== Books ==
Graham is the author of several self-help and business-related books, including:

- The Ultimate Guide to Sport Event Management and Marketing (1995).
- You Can Make It Happen: A Nine-Step Plan for Success (1997)
- You Can Make It Happen Every Day (1998)
- Teens Can Make It Happen: Nine Steps for Success (2000)
- Teens Can Make It Happen Workbook (2001)
- The Ultimate Guide to Sports Marketing (2001)
- Build Your Own Life Brand!: A Powerful Strategy to Maximize Your Potential and Enhance Your Value for Ultimate Achievement (2002)
- Move Without the Ball: Put Your Skills and Your Magic to Work for You (2004)
- Who Are You? (2005)
- Diversity: Leaders Not Labels: A New Plan for the 21st Century (2006)
- Identity: Your Passport to Success (2012)
- Identity Leadership: To Lead Others You Must First Lead Yourself (2019)

== Other publications ==
Graham became a columnist for The Huffington Post in 2013. He contributed an article on personal identity to the College Board School Counseling Series in 2012.

== Personal life ==
Graham told the Chicago Tribune in 1995 that he married immediately after college, and that his marriage had lasted six years. He has a daughter from that marriage.

Graham was a tennis instructor at the Denver Country Club when he met Robin Robinson. She was a weekend news anchor on KMGH-TV at the time. They were in a relationship from 1982 to 1986.

Graham has been the subject of much publicity since 1986, most notably through tabloid articles claiming to chronicle his ongoing relationship with Oprah Winfrey. Graham has been with Winfrey since 1986.

He was conferred an honorary degree by Notre Dame de Namur University of Belmont, Calif., at the university's 167th Commencement ceremony on May 4, 2019.
