= Cape May Court House, New Jersey =

Populated place in Cape May County, New Jersey, US

- Census-designated place
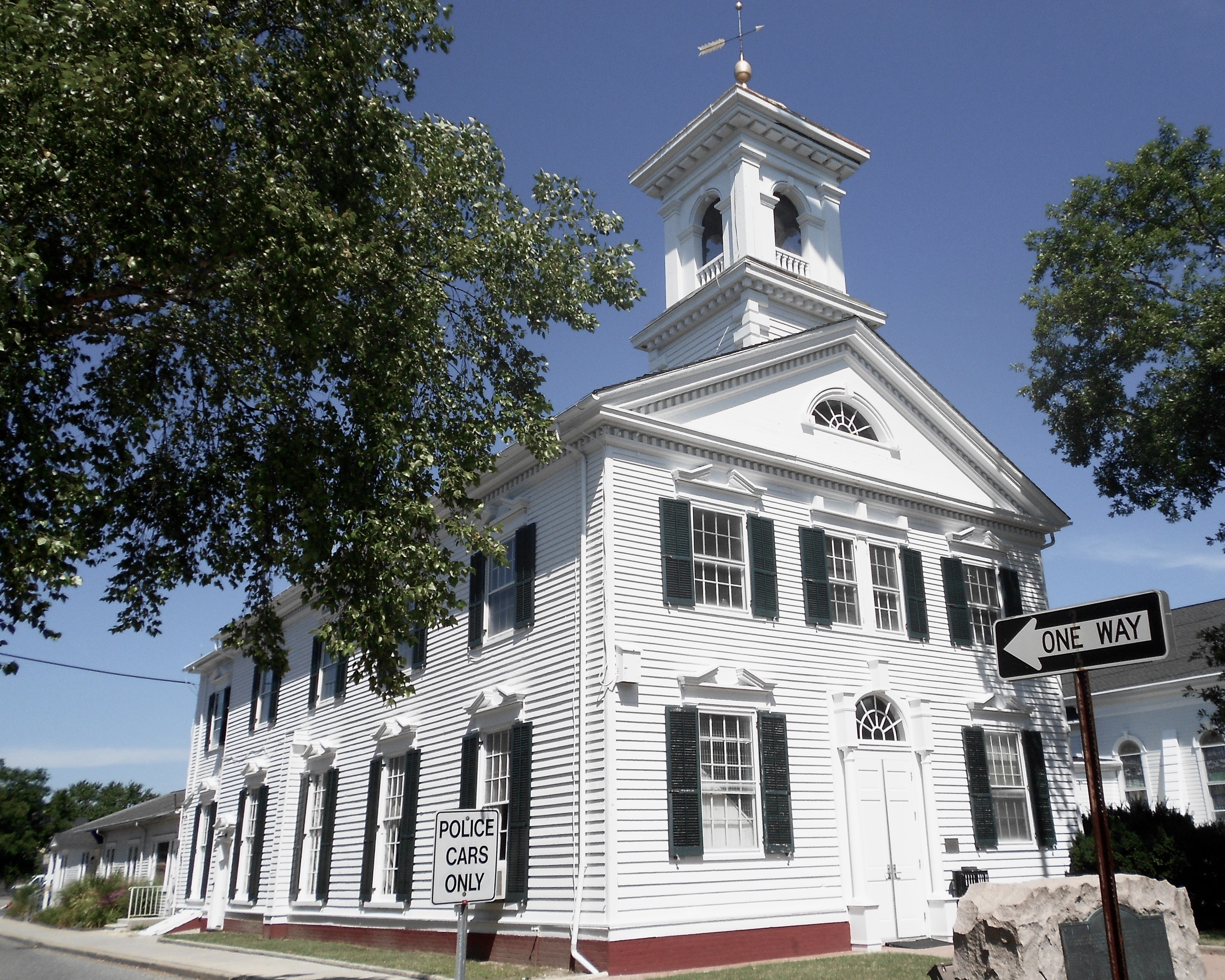
- Old Cape May County Courthouse Building
- Interactive map of Cape May Court House, New Jersey
- Location in Cape May County Location in New Jersey Location in the United States
- Coordinates: 39.07892°N 74.820866°W
- Country: United States
- State: New Jersey
- County: Cape May
- Township: Middle

Area
  - Total: 9.63 sq mi (24.94 km^{2})
  - Land: 8.66 sq mi (22.42 km^{2})
  - Water: 0.97 sq mi (2.52 km^{2}) 9.83%
- Elevation: 13 ft (4 m)

Population (2020)
  - Total: 5,573
  - Density: 643.53/sq mi (248.47/km^{2})
- Time zone: UTC−05:00 (Eastern (EST))
  - Summer (DST): UTC−04:00 (Eastern (EDT))
- ZIP Code: 08210
- Area code: 609
- FIPS code: 34-10300
- GNIS feature ID: 02389275

Cape May Court House is an unincorporated community and census-designated place (CDP) located within Middle Township in Cape May County, in the U.S. state of New Jersey. It is part of the Ocean City metropolitan statistical area. As of the 2020 United States census, the CDP's population was 5,573, reflecting a 4.4% increase from the 5,338 enumerated at the 2010 U.S. census, in turn an increase of 13.5% from the 4,704 counted in the 2000 census. It is the county seat of Cape May County and serves as the principal administrative hub for the township. It constitutes part of the greater Philadelphia metropolitan area.

Cooper University Hospital Cape Regional is the only hospital in Cape May County. The Cape May County Park and Zoo is also located in Cape May Court House.

== History ==
Cape May Court House was laid out in 1703 by Jeremiah Hand and was first called Rumney Marsh and afterward Middleton before adopting its present name. The Court of Cape May County met in private homes and the First Baptist Church until 1764, when Daniel Hand set aside 1-acre (4,000 m^{2}) of his property for the construction of a courthouse and jail. This building was replaced by the current structure in 1849.

== Geography ==
According to the U.S. Census Bureau, the CDP had a total area of 9.899 square miles (25.64 km^{2}), including 8.926 square miles (23.12 km^{2}) of land and 0.973 square miles (2.52 km^{2}) of water (9.83%).

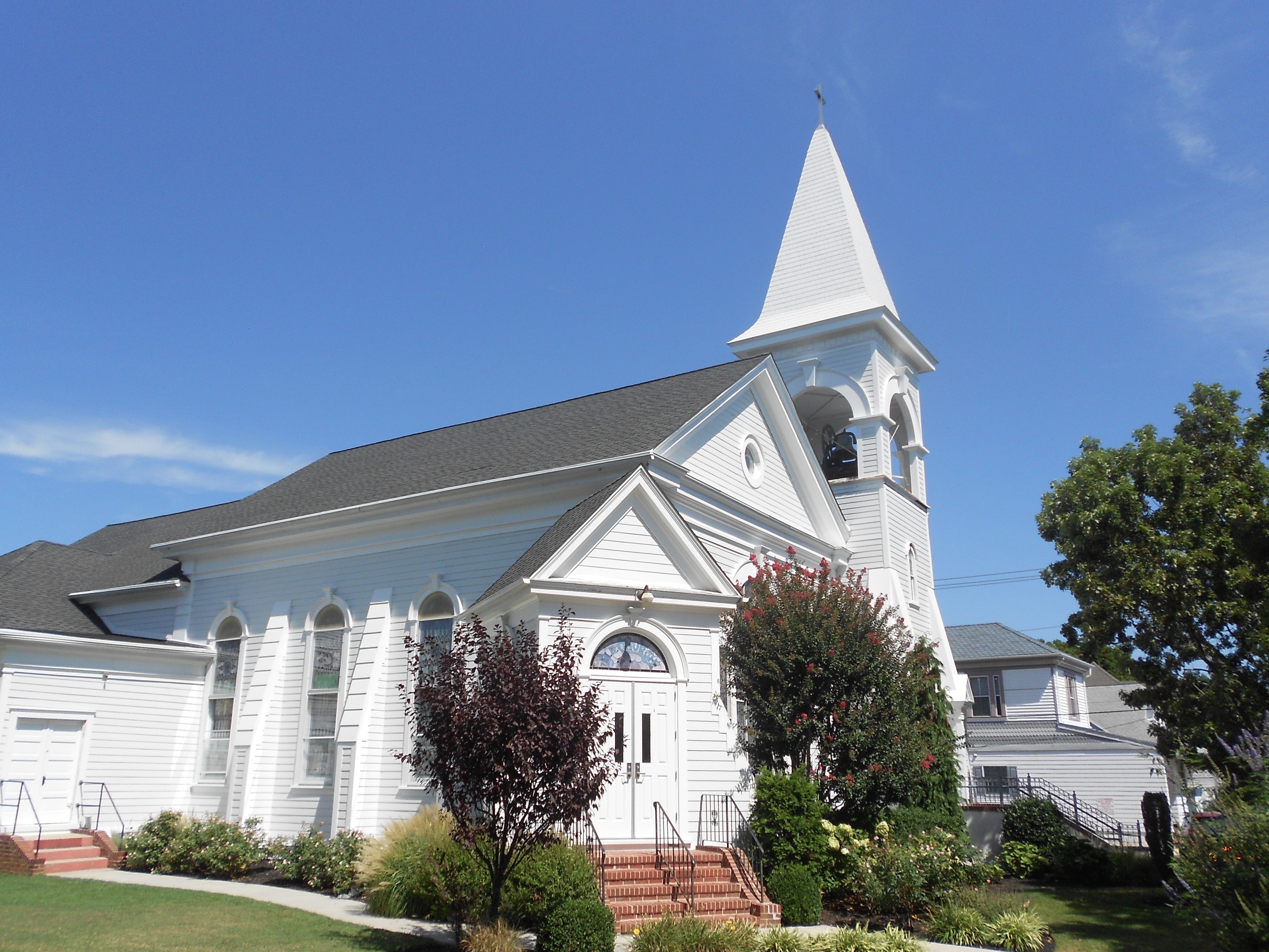
First United Methodist Church, next to the old courthouse

== Demographics ==
Historical population
Census	Pop.	Note	%±
1950	1,093		—
1960	1,749		60.0%
1970	2,062		17.9%
1980	3,597		74.4%
1990	4,426		23.0%
2000	4,704		6.3%
2010	5,338		13.5%
2020	5,573		4.4%
Population sources:1960-1980 1950 1960 1970; 1980 1990 2000; 2010 2020

Cape May Court House first appeared as an unincorporated community in the 1950 U.S. census; and then listed as a census designated place in the 1980 U.S. census.

=== Racial and ethnic composition ===
Cape May Court House CDP, New Jersey – Racial and ethnic composition Note: the US Census treats Hispanic/Latino as an ethnic category. This table excludes Latinos from the racial categories and assigns them to a separate category. Hispanics/Latinos may be of any race.
Race / Ethnicity (NH = Non-Hispanic)	Pop 2000	Pop 2010	Pop 2020	% 2000	% 2010	% 2020
White alone (NH)	3,923	4,457	4,486	83.40%	83.50%	80.50%
Black or African American alone (NH)	508	480	382	10.80%	8.99%	6.85%
Native American or Alaska Native alone (NH)	5	3	3	0.11%	0.06%	0.05%
Asian alone (NH)	127	125	119	2.70%	2.34%	2.14%
Native Hawaiian or Pacific Islander alone (NH)	3	2	0	0.06%	0.04%	0.00%
Other race alone (NH)	1	8	21	0.02%	0.15%	0.38%
Mixed race or Multiracial (NH)	63	101	192	1.34%	1.89%	3.45%
Hispanic or Latino (any race)	74	162	370	1.57%	3.03%	6.64%
Total	4,704	5,338	5,573	100.00%	100.00%	100.00%

=== 2020 census ===
As of the 2020 census, Cape May Court House had a population of 5,573. The median age was 50.4 years. 17.8% of residents were under the age of 18, and 27.4% were 65 years of age or older. For every 100 females there were 92.0 males, and for every 100 females age 18 and over there were 88.4 males.

92.0% of residents lived in urban areas, while 8.0% lived in rural areas.

There were 2,301 households, of which 23.3% had children under the age of 18 living in them. Of all households, 45.9% were married-couple households, 16.5% were households with a male householder and no spouse or partner present, and 30.9% were households with a female householder and no spouse or partner present. About 31.4% of all households were made up of individuals, and 18.1% had someone living alone who was 65 years of age or older.

There were 2,758 housing units, of which 16.6% were vacant. The homeowner vacancy rate was 1.7% and the rental vacancy rate was 5.9%.

=== 2010 census ===
The 2010 United States census counted 5,338 people, 2,165 households, and 1,396 families in the CDP. The population density was 598.0 people per square mile (230.9 people/km^{2}). There were 2,603 housing units at an average density of 291.6 units per square mile (112.6 units/km^{2}). The racial makeup was 85.14% (4,545) White, 9.25% (494) Black or African American, 0.11% (6) Native American, 2.36% (126) Asian, 0.04% (2) Pacific Islander, 0.92% (49) from other races, and 2.17% (116) from two or more races. Hispanic or Latino of any race were 3.03% (162) of the population.

Of the 2,165 households, 23.5% had children under the age of 18; 48.1% were married couples living together; 12.0% had a female householder with no husband present and 35.5% were non-families. Of all households, 29.4% were made up of individuals and 15.4% had someone living alone who was 65 years of age or older. The average household size was 2.37 and the average family size was 2.95.

19.9% of the population were under the age of 18, 6.7% from 18 to 24, 20.5% from 25 to 44, 30.6% from 45 to 64, and 22.3% who were 65 years of age or older. The median age was 47.1 years. For every 100 females, the population had 88.8 males. For every 100 females ages 18 and older there were 83.4 males.

The Census Bureau's 2006–2010 American Community Survey showed that (in 2010 inflation-adjusted dollars) median household income was $56,773 (with a margin of error of +/- $14,695) and the median family income was $73,618 (+/- $19,854). Males had a median income of $57,109 (+/- $11,100) versus $50,231 (+/- $6,373) for females. The per capita income for the CDP was $31,865 (+/- $4,296). About 0.9% of families and 3.0% of the population were below the poverty line, including 1.1% of those under age 18 and 4.9% of those age 65 or over.

=== 2000 census ===
As of the 2000 U.S. census, there were 4,704 people, 1,732 households, and 1,221 families residing in the CDP. The population density was 202.3 people/km^{2} (524 people/mi^{2}). There were 2,086 housing units at an average density of 89.7 units/km^{2} (232 units/mi^{2}). The racial makeup of the CDP was 84.35% White, 10.88% African American, 0.19% Native American, 2.70% Asian, 0.06% Pacific Islander, 0.40% from other races, and 1.40% from two or more races. Hispanic or Latino of any race were 1.57% of the population.

There were 1,732 households, out of which 31.3% had children under the age of 18 living with them, 54.4% were married couples living together, 11.8% had a female householder with no husband present, and 29.5% were non-families. 24.9% of all households were made up of individuals, and 12.1% had someone living alone who was 65 years of age or older. The average household size was 2.56 and the average family size was 3.07.

In the CDP, the population was spread out, with 23.9% under the age of 18, 6.3% from 18 to 24, 25.8% from 25 to 44, 24.3% from 45 to 64, and 19.8% who were 65 years of age or older. The median age was 41 years. For every 100 females, there were 86.8 males. For every 100 females age 18 and over, there were 81.4 males.

The median income for a household in the CDP was $48,902, and the median income for a family was $56,707. Males had a median income of $39,848 versus $28,043 for females. The per capita income for the CDP was $21,541. About 5.3% of families and 7.0% of the population were below the poverty line, including 12.1% of those under age 18 and 4.4% of those age 65 or over.

== Education ==
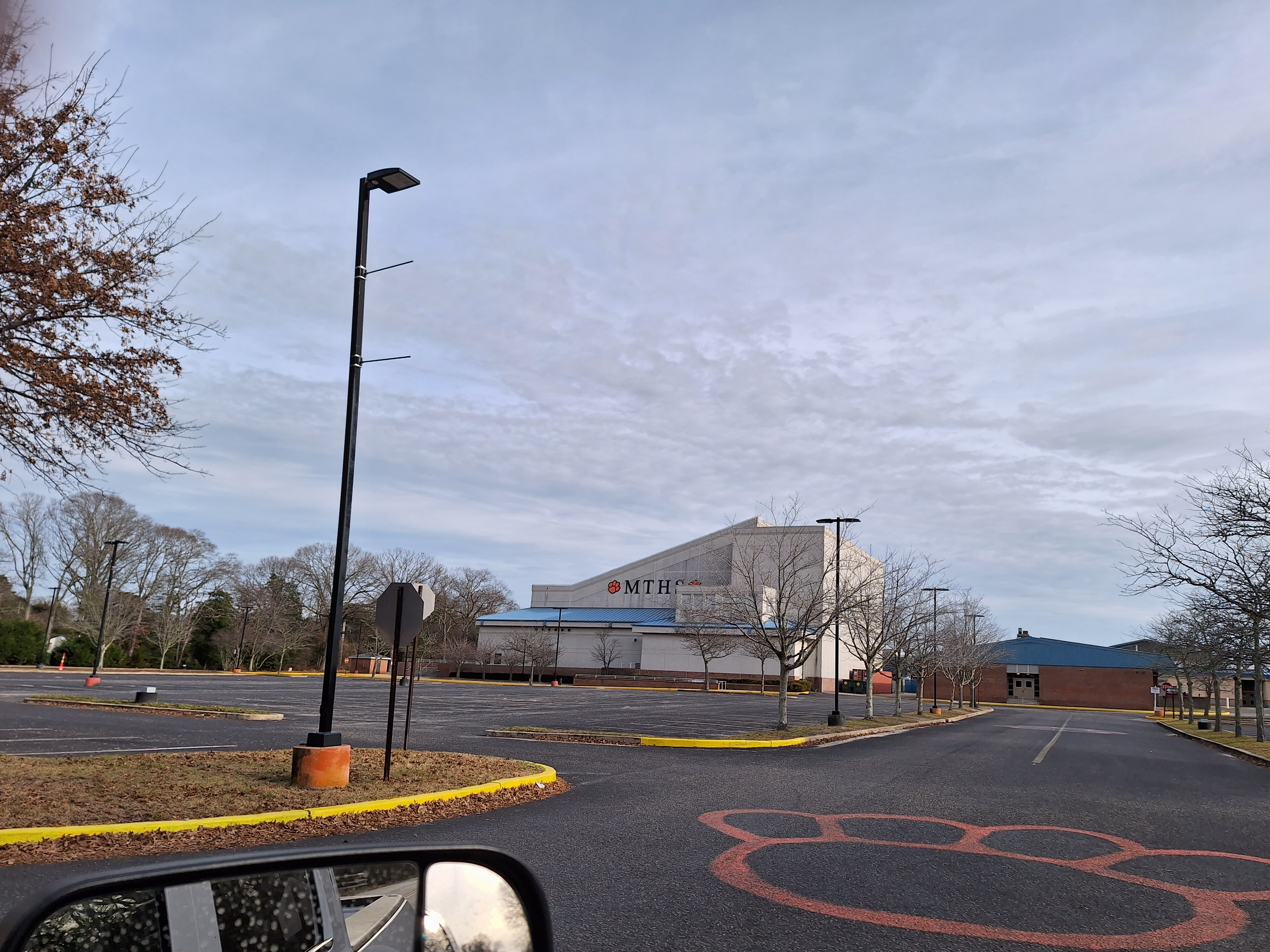
Middle Township High School

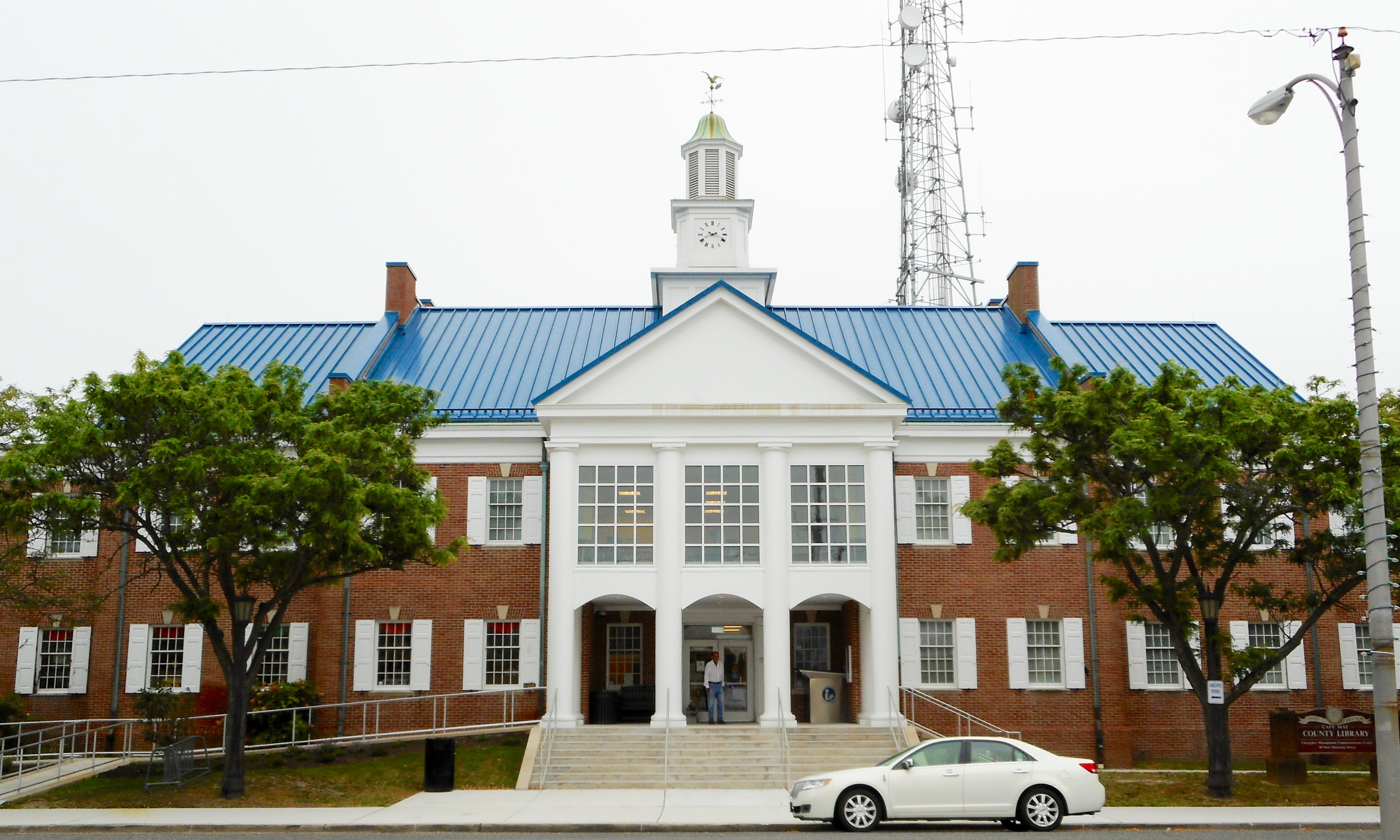
Main branch of Cape May County Library

Middle Township Public Schools is the local school district for Middle Township: it operates Middle Township High School. All four schools and the district headquarters are in Cape May Court House CDP.

The Cape May County Technical School District operates Cape May County Technical High School which has a CMCH address, but is not within the CDP boundaries. Special needs students may be referred to Cape May County Special Services School District in Cape May Court House.

Areas in Dennis Township with Cape May Court House postal addresses, which are not in the CDP, are in Dennis Township Public Schools for K-8.

Southern Cape Christian School (formerly Cape Christian Academy) is a private Christian K-12 school in Middle Township in Cape May Court House.

The Roman Catholic Diocese of Camden operates Bishop McHugh Regional School, a Catholic K–8 school, in Ocean View, Dennis Township, which has a Cape May Courthouse postal address. It is supported by four parishes in Cape May County including the Cape May Courthouse Church. The sole Catholic high school program in Cape May County is in Wildwood Catholic Academy (K–12) in North Wildwood, which also operates under the Camden Diocese.

Church Street Christian School, 18 months to preschool, is on the property of its sponsor, First United Methodist Church. It was formerly a Montessori school.

Cape May County Library has its Cape May Court House branch in the CDP.

== Parks and recreation ==
The Cape May County Park & Zoo in Cape May Court House provides free year-round admission to a collection of over 550 animals representing 250 species in 85 acres (34 ha) of exhibits. The zoo is located in the center of Cape May County's Central Park, and together the zoo and the park cover about 220 acres. The zoo began operation in 1978. Its principal exhibit areas are a 57-acre (23 ha) African Savanna, a free-flight aviary, and a reptile collection.

The Clarence and Georgiana Davies Sports Complex includes basketball courts, soccer fields, and baseball fields. The Middle Township Recreation Department maintains indoor basketball courts, baseball fields, football fields, and soccer fields.

== Healthcare ==
Cooper University Hospital Cape Regional, located in Cape May Court House, is the only hospital in Cape May County. It was known as Burdette Tomlin Memorial Hospital until April 2007, when it was renamed Cape Regional Medical Center, which was used until June 2024. In May 2021, The Claire C. Brodesser Surgery Center opened to patients needing ambulatory surgery and endoscopy services.

== Wineries ==
- Jessie Creek Winery
- Natali Vineyards

== Notable people ==
People who were born in, residents of, or otherwise closely associated with Cape May Court House include:

- Kevin Bramble (born 1972), disabled ski racer, freeskier, and monoski designer and builder
- Daniel Cohen (1936–2018), children's writer
- Joe Fala (born 1997), soccer player who has played as a defender for New York Red Bulls II in the USL Championship.
- Jonathan F. Leaming (1822–1907) politician and physician
- Matthew Maher (born 1984), retired soccer defender, who was sentenced to five and a half years in prison for first degree aggravated manslaughter and drunken driving
- Matt Szczur (born 1989), Major League Baseball player for the San Diego Padres
- Julius H. Taylor (1914–2011), professor emeritus at Morgan State University who was chairperson of the department of physics
