= Cape May County Special Services School District =

School district in Cape May County, New Jersey, US

Cape May County Special Services District

Address
- 148 Crest Haven Drive Cape May Court House, Cape May County, New Jersey, 08210; United States
- Coordinates: 39.100285°N 74.801744°W

District information
- Grades: Special services (pre-K to 12)
- Superintendent: Jamie P. Moscony
- Business administrator: Kathleen Allen
- Schools: 2

Students and staff
- Enrollment: 132 (as of 2023–24)
- Faculty: 40.0 FTEs
- Student–teacher ratio: 3.3:1

Other information
- Website: www.cmcspecialservices.org
Ind.	Per pupil	District spending	Rank (*)	Special serv. average	%± vs. average
1A	Total Spending	$60,948	6	$18,891	222.6%
1	Budgetary Cost	55,270	5	57,252	−3.5%
2	Classroom Instruction	29,566	5	32,861	−10.0%
6	Support Services	10,779	6	11,945	−9.8%
8	Administrative Cost	5,352	2	5,725	−6.5%
10	Operations & Maintenance	9,528	8	6,215	53.3%
16	Median Teacher Salary	77,421	6	77,183
Data from NJDoE 2014 Taxpayers' Guide to Education Spending. *Of Special serv. districts with any number of students. Lowest spending=1; Highest=8

The Cape May County Special Services School District (CMCSSSD) is a special education public school district headquartered in Middle Township, in Cape May County, in the U.S. state of New Jersey. The district's schools offer educational and therapeutic services for students of elementary and high school age from across the county who have emotional of physical disabilities that cannot be addressed by their sending districts.

As of the 2023–24 school year, the district, comprised of two schools, had an enrollment of 132 students and 40.0 classroom teachers (on an FTE basis), for a student–teacher ratio of 3.3:1.

Its facility has a Cape May Court House postal address but is not within the CMCH census-designated place.

== History ==
The district was established in 1974.

== Schools ==
Schools in the district (with 2023–24 enrollment data from the National Center for Education Statistics) are:

- Ocean Academy with 146 students in grades PreK–8
- Cape May County High School with 87 students in grades 9–12

Previously middle school grades were organized as George E. Bailey Middle School, and the high school was Alternative High School.

== Administration ==
Core members of the district's administration are:

- Jamie P. Moscony, superintendent
- Kathleen Allen, business administrator and board secretary

== Board of education ==
The district's board of education sets policy and oversee the fiscal and educational operation of the district through its administration. The board is composed of seven members, the county superintendent of schools, who serves on an ex officio basis, and six members who are appointed by the Cape May County Board of County Commissioners to three-year terms of office on a staggered basis, with two member terms up for reappointment and expiring each year. The board appoints a superintendent to oversee the district's day-to-day operations and a business administrator to supervise the business functions of the district.
