= Ocean Drive (New Jersey) =

Highway in New Jersey

Ocean Drive
- Ocean Drive highlighted in red

Route information
- Maintained by NJDOT, Cape May and Atlantic counties, Egg Harbor Township, Ventnor City, Atlantic City, and Cape May County Bridge Commission
- Length: 50.0 mi (80.5 km)
- Existed: June 1940–present

Major junctions
- South end: Sunset Beach in Cape May Point
- Route 109 in Lower Township; Route 47 in Wildwood; Route 147 in North Wildwood; Route 152 in Longport; CR 563 in Margate City; US 40 / US 322 in Atlantic City
- North end: Maine Avenue in Atlantic City

Location
- Country: United States
- State: New Jersey
- Counties: Cape May, Atlantic

Highway system
- New Jersey State Highway Routes; Interstate; US; State; Scenic Byways
| ← CR 627 | → CR 630 |
| ← CR 618 | → CR 620 |
| ← CR 620 | → CR 622 |
| ← CR 655 | → CR 657 |

Ocean Drive is a series of local toll roads in southern New Jersey, connecting Atlantic City to Cape May along barrier islands on the Atlantic Ocean. It consists of several roads and includes all five drawbridges owned by the Cape May County Bridge Commission.

== Route description ==
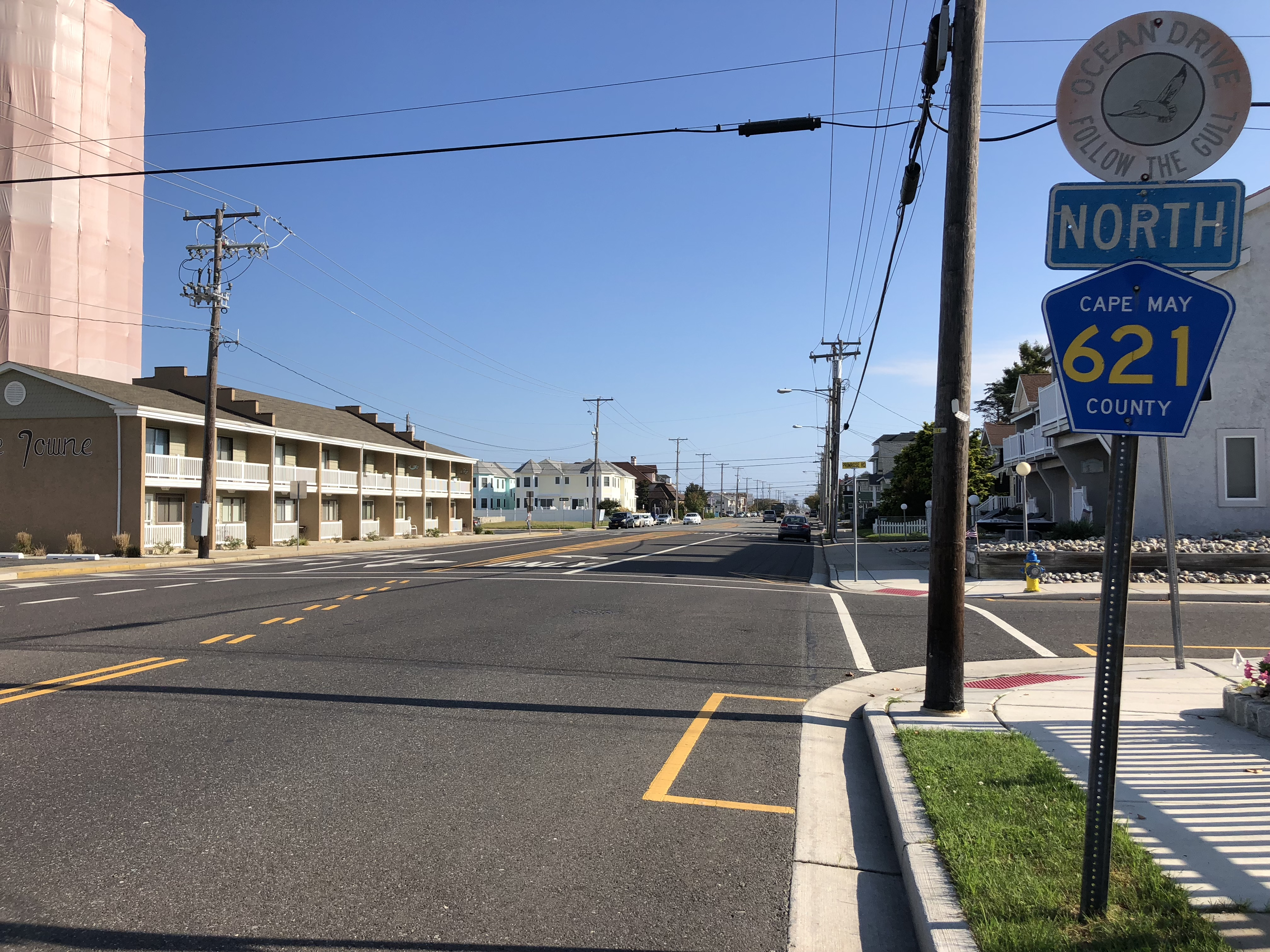
Northbound on Ocean Drive (CR 621) in Wildwood Crest

Ocean Drive begins in Cape May Point, and its southern terminus is split among two separate roads. One branch of Ocean Drive begins on Sunset Boulevard (CR 606) at its dead end and travels for 0.5 miles. The second branch of Ocean Drive begins on Cape Avenue (CR 651) at Lincoln Avenue, and travels for 0.7 miles. The two branches meet at an intersection, and Ocean Drive continues along CR 606 into Cape May. At the end of CR 606, Ocean Drive turns south along Broadway (CR 626), then heads east along Beach Avenue (CR 604). Ocean Drive travels along the coast to Pittsburgh Avenue (CR 622), and heads north along CR 622 to its terminus at Washington Street (Route 109), and continues north again.

It crosses the Cape May Canal into Lower Township and makes a right turn onto CR 621. At this point, Ocean Drive signage begins. It then crosses over the Middle Thorofare Bridge (toll southbound) and continues north into Wildwood Crest. Ocean Drive follows CR 621 through the length of The Wildwoods, passing through Wildwood Crest, Wildwood (where it intersects Route 147), and finally continuing into North Wildwood. In North Wildwood, CR 621 ends and Ocean Drive follows Route 147 into Middle Township.

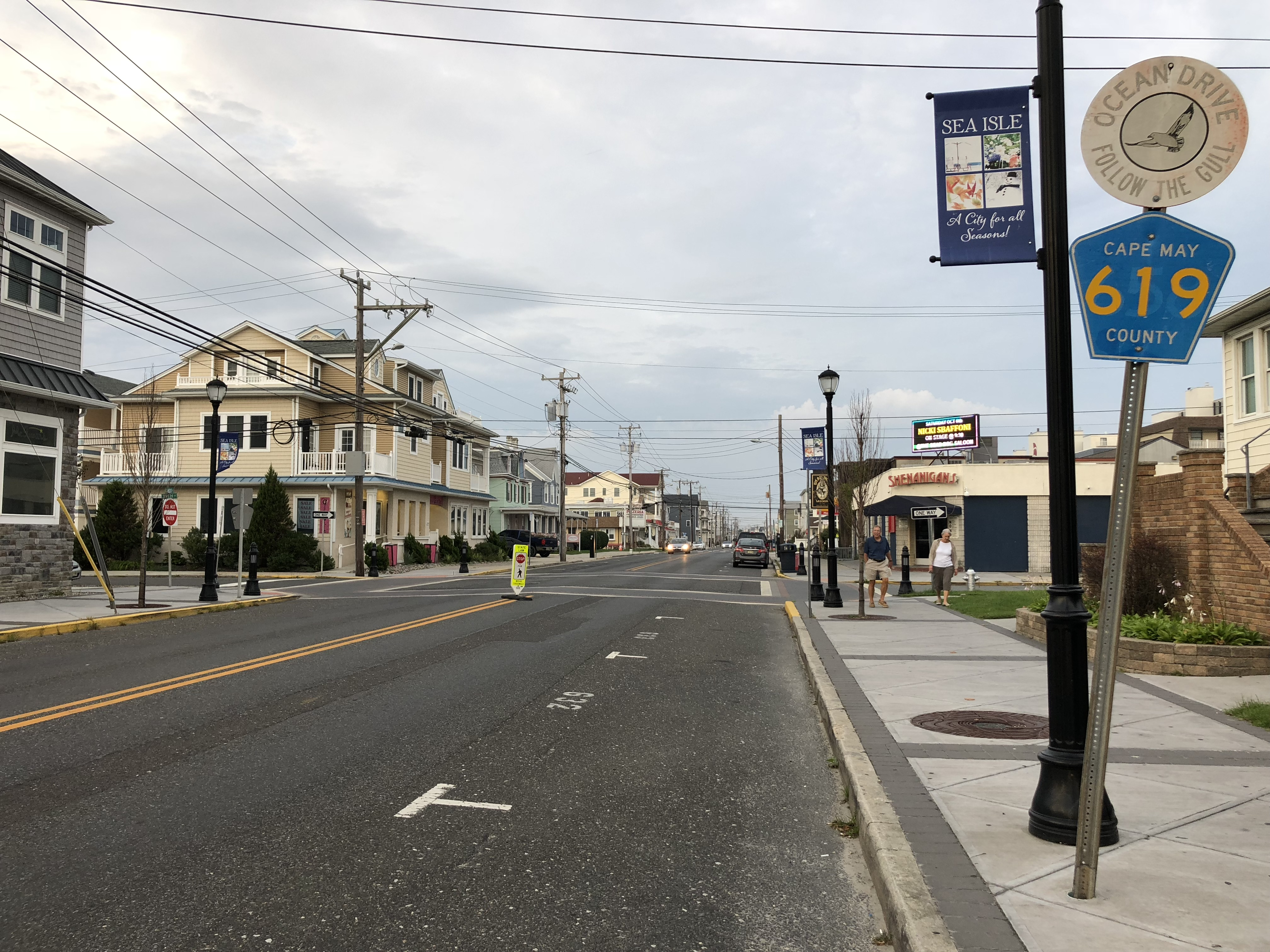
View north on Ocean Drive (CR 619) between 40th Street and 39th Street in downtown Sea Isle City

It turns right onto CR 619 and crosses over the Grassy Sound Bridge (toll northbound) and then the Stone Harbor Bridge into Stone Harbor. Ocean Drive follows CR 619 north through Stone Harbor's 3rd Avenue and into Avalon on Ocean Drive (at 80th Street. 3rd Avenue turns into Ocean Drive). It crosses over the Townsends Inlet Bridge (toll southbound) and continues north through Sea Isle City. It then heads through the Strathmere section of Upper Township before crossing the Strathmere Bascule Bridge (toll northbound) and Corson's Inlet Bridge into Ocean City.

Ocean Drive continues to follow CR 619 north through Ocean City before meeting CR 623. It follows CR 623 for several blocks to the northwest on 34th Street before following CR 656 (Bay Avenue) through Downtown Ocean City, where it crosses the intersection with 9th Street, which provides access to Route 152. Ocean Drive crosses the Ocean City-Longport Bridge (toll southbound) over the Great Egg Harbor Bay into Egg Harbor Township, Atlantic County.

Upon entering Atlantic County, Ocean Drive follows the northern approach of the Ocean City-Longport Bridge to Route 152. At this point, Ocean Drive signage ends. It then makes a right turn on Route 152 and follows it to the John F. Kennedy Memorial Bridge over the Intracoastal Waterway into Longport. Ocean Drive heads north on Atlantic Avenue through Longport, Margate City and Ventnor City. Atlantic Avenue continues into Atlantic City, and Ocean Drive terminates at the end of Atlantic Avenue in Uptown Atlantic City at North Maine Avenue.

== Tolls ==
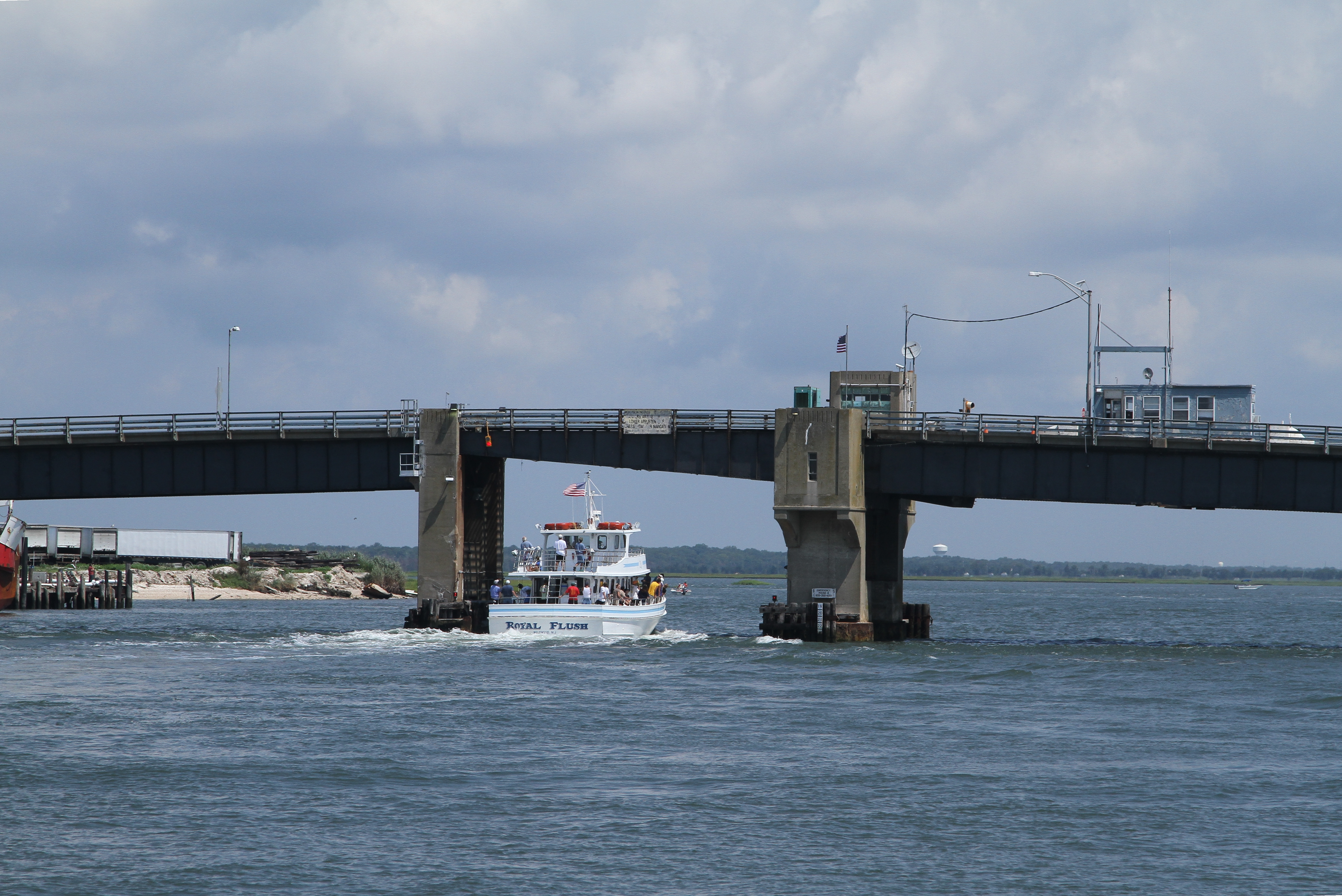
Middle Thorofare Bridge

The five toll bridges on Ocean Drive charge $2.50 for cars, which can be paid with E-ZPass or toll-by-plate. The Middle Thorofare, Townsends Inlet, and Ocean City-Longport bridges have tolls in the southbound direction while the Grassy Sound and Corsons Inlet bridges have northbound tolls. The tolls were slated to rise to $2.50 in February 2023 and $3 in February 2024.

When the Ocean Drive bridges were first built, the toll for cars was 25 cents, charged in both directions at the Middle Thorofare, Grassy Sound, Townsends Inlet, Corsons Inlet, and Ocean City-Longport bridges. Toll hikes occurred in 1978, 1984, and 1988 in order to fund construction projects to the bridges. Following the rebuilding of the Ocean City-Longport Bridge in 2002, that bridge was converted to one-way tolling, with a $1 toll charged to cars in the southbound direction. The other bridges would be converted to one-way tolling by 2002. Tolls were raised to $1.50 on February 1, 2009.

== History ==
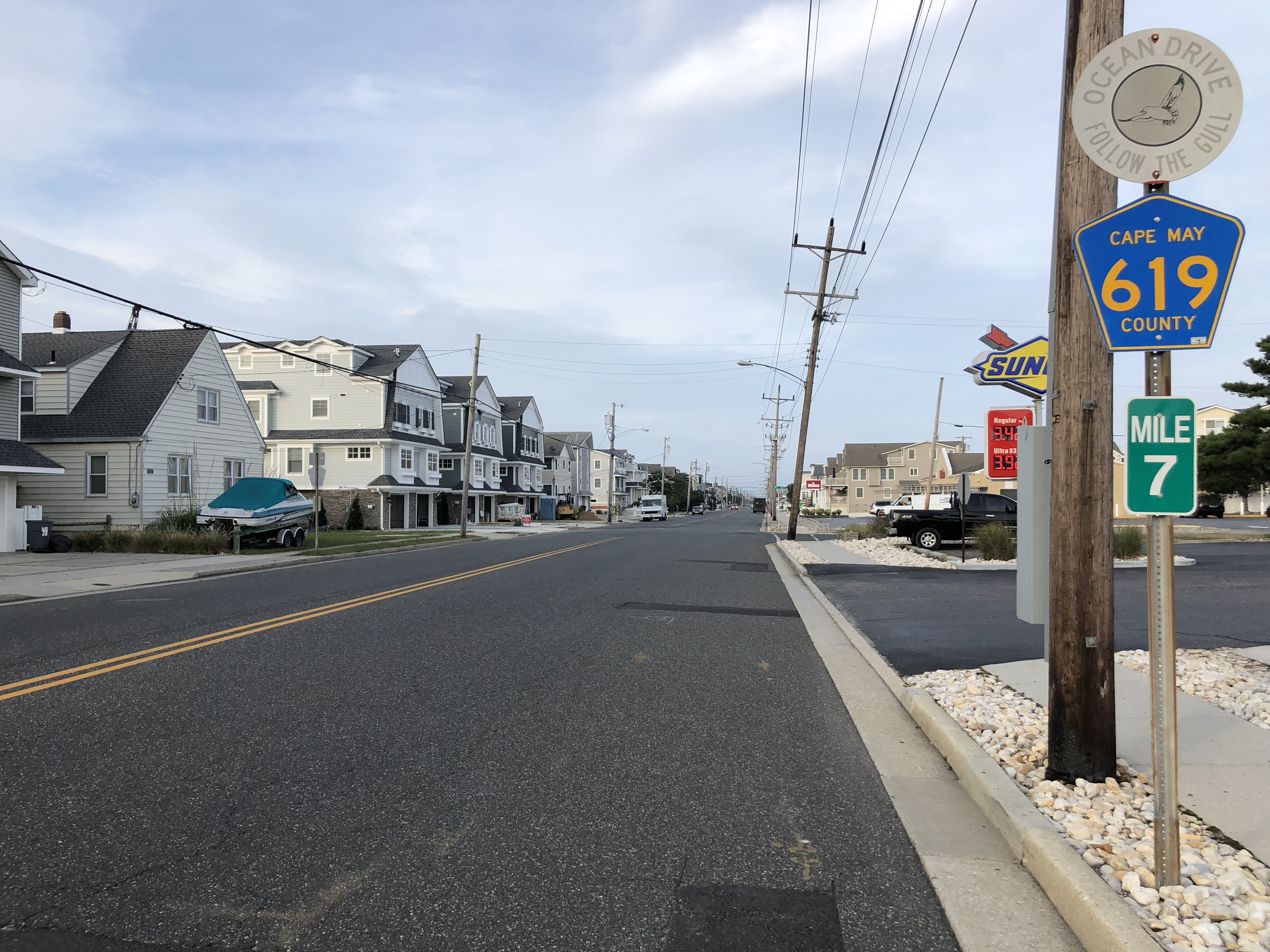
Northbound on Ocean Drive (CR 619) past CR 601 in Avalon

The Cape May County Bridge Commission was created by the county in 1934 in order to build a series of toll bridges linking the coastal communities of Cape May County. With the creation of this agency, the bridges were to receive federal funding through the New Deal. The road would mostly be designated over existing streets and bridges, however, some new ones would have to be built. Work on these began in 1939. In June 1940, these opened, and included the Middle Thorofare Bridge, the Strathmere Bascule Bridge, and Townsends Inlet Bridge. Soon after, the alignment through Cape May was competed The rest of the original construction was delayed because of World War II. In 1946, the Ocean City-Longport Bridge, predating the road by a few years (it was built in 1927) and built as part of an entirely separate project by a separate agency that when bankrupt in 1934, was purchased by the commission and designated as part of the road. From 1947 to 1948, the Corsons Inlet Bridge was built. With the completion of this span, the road and provided a continuous link between Cape May and Atlantic City.

In 1947, a major renovation began on the Ocean City-Longport Bridge, the first such work on the road. This was necessary due to the bridge being such a financial failure that the previous owner had lacked the funds necessary to undertake regular maintenance, resulting in the bridge becoming structurally deficient after only 20 years. The work consisted of replacing the deck, adding new hand rails, reconstructing the sidewalk from a single wide one into two smaller ones, installing marine cables. The last of the work was completed in 1950.

In 1952, most of Ocean Drive was designated as part of several county routes. The route between Sunset Beach and Cape May became CR 6 while the spur into Cape May Point became CR 51. Within Cape May, Ocean Drive became CR 26, CR 4, and CR 22 before it joined US 9. Past US 9, it became CR 21 and part of CR 585 before heading through Wildwood Crest and Wildwood along Atlantic Avenue. In North Wildwood, the route became CR 7/CR 585 before turning north into Middle Township and following CR 18/CR 585. Ocean Drive turned north and followed CR 30 through Stone Harbor and Avalon and CR 19 through Sea Isle City and into Ocean City. In Ocean City, Ocean Drive continued north from CR 19 onto Wesley Avenue and Gardens Parkway.

The portion across the Cape May Canal between Cape May Canal and Lower Township was initially designated as part of Route 4 before that route was removed as part of the 1953 New Jersey state highway renumbering, witch saw state routes concurrent with more important highways removed in an effort to simplify identification.

In 1955, the Ocean City-Longport Bridge received a minor improvement; its operator room was renovated with new doors and windows, while a steel deck was installed on the draw span. This made it consistent with the other bridges.

The current Cape May Canal Bridge, a girder bridge, was opened to traffic in 1960, replacing the original Cape May Canal Bridge, which was swing bridge from the early 1940s, and had resulted in major congestion. The bridge was initially meant to be named, though this did not occur.

In 1965, a replacement of the draw bridge connecting to Longport began construction. This was completed by 1967. It is designated as the JFK Memorial Bridge.

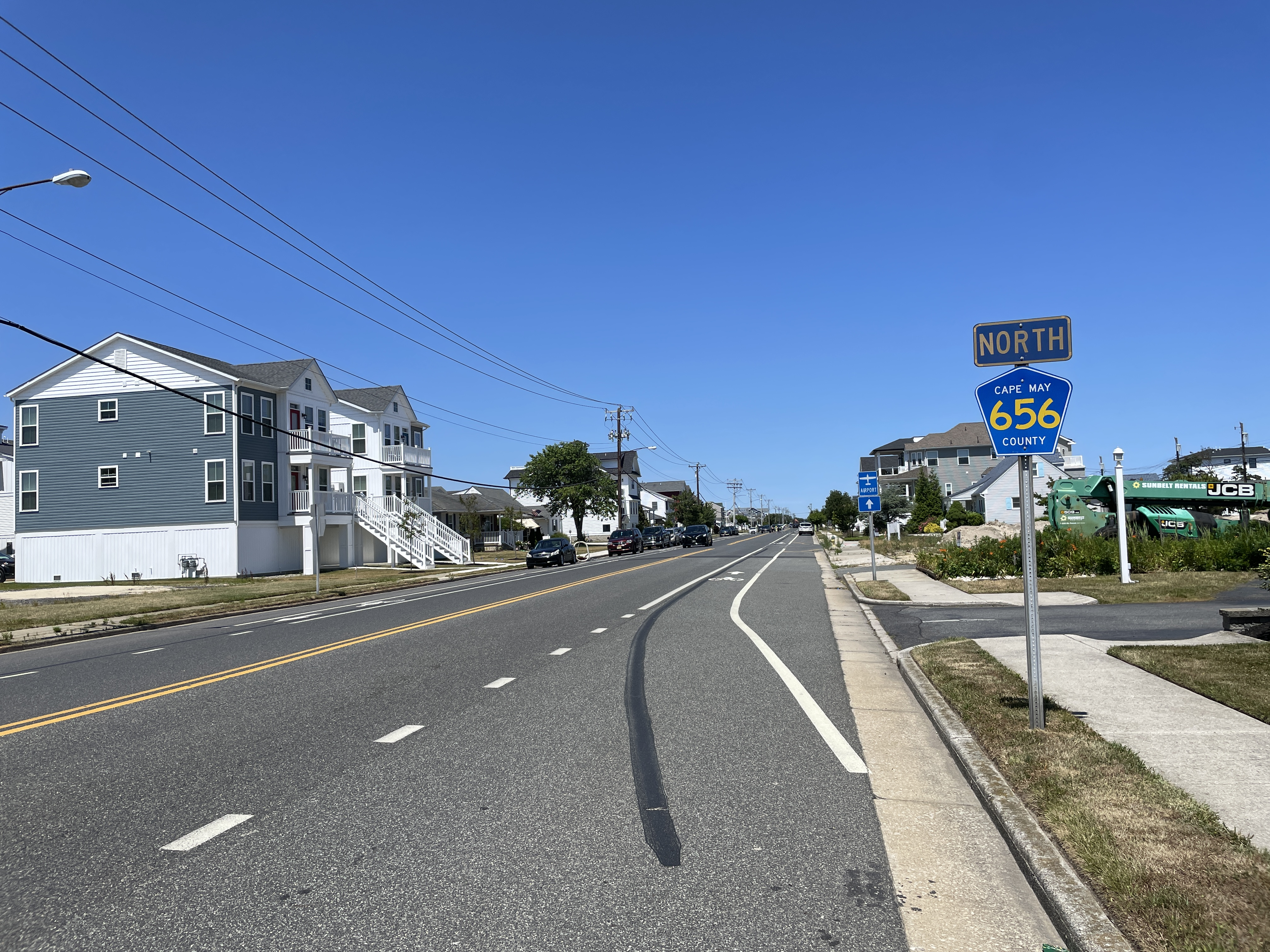
Ocean Drive (CR 656) northbound past CR 623 in Ocean City

The state proposed transferring the maintenance of a portion in Atlantic County to NJDOT in 1968. This was approved in 1969. With this, a short portion of road in Atlantic County that was formerly designated as CR 20, was redesignated as Route 152.

In 1971, the portion of road leading into North Wildwood was designated as part of Route 147. In addition, multiple changes were made to the county route designations. CR 585 had been removed from the road and the remaining county routes in Cape May and Atlantic counties were given numbers in the 600-series. As a result, CR 6 became CR 606, CR 51 became CR 651, CR 26 became CR 626, CR 4 became CR 604, CR 22 became CR 622, CR 21 and CR 7 became CR 621, CR 30 and CR 19 became CR 619, and CR 29 became CR 629.

The portion of road between Cape May Canal and Lower Township was to be redesignated as Route 109, with US 9 being realigned to travel to Delaware; this occurred in 1972.

In 1977, the original toll plaza at the Ocean City-Longport Bridge was demolished and a wider one built in its place. This was done to meet increased traffic demands.

In 1991, the Grassy Sound Bridge was given an upgraded draw opening system.

In 1993, the Ocean City-Longport Bridge was repainted, given an upgraded draw opening system, had its deadman replaced, and was given a modernized electric system on top of replaced safety gates and warning signals.

In 1994, the current fixed-span steel girder bridge on the section concurrent with NJ 147 was built. This was done to protect the road from flooding, as well as so that the only direct connection to North Wildwood was four lanes wide. As a result of the bridge replacement, the road was realigned off the former drawbridge, and the original alignment became CR 665. This project also rebuilt the intersection between CR 621 and NJ 147 to meet with the new alignment. By this point, by the Route 147 concurrency had been extended to New York Avenue in North Wildwood, replacing a short portion of CR 621. In addition, the road was realigned as to travel on CR 621 for its entire length in the Wildwoods, while also being designated to run with CR 656 through the northern part of Ocean City.

In 1998, major renovations were made to the Corsons Inlet Bridge. Additionally, the Middle Thorofare Bridge, Strathmere Bascule Bridge, and Townsend's Inlet Bridge were all repainted, and steel and fender repairs were made to all five toll bridges.

As part of improvements to the Rio Grande Avenue, the intersection with NJ 47 in Wildwood received improvements to make it reminisce the doo wop atmosphere the town is known for in 2001.

By the late 1980s, it had become apparent the Ocean city-Longport bridge was far to structurally unsafe for continued operation, and needed to be replaced. The new bridge began construction in 1999, and opened in September 2002. The new bridge is a fixed span high rise structure. Unlike the old bridge and other bridges along the route, its toll plaza is located on the road rather than the bridge itself. A portion of the old bridge became a fishing pier. The bridge featured a new toll plaza that only served one direction. All of the other bridges along the route were also converted to one way tolling by May 2005.

In November 2005, major renovations were completed at the Townsends Inlet Bridge and Corsons Inlet Bridge, while all four of the bascule toll bridges were given reconstructed toll sheds and minor repairs.

On November 7, 2009, the Cape May Canal Bridge was officially named the Cape May County Veterans Memorial Bridge, honoring all veterans.

The Middle Thoroughfare Bridge underwent emergency scour repairs following Hurricane Sandy in October 2012.

In 2013, the Grassy Sound Bridge became toll free during nighttime hours. This was done in an effort to save money that would have otherwise been spent on toll collectors. There is little demand or the bridge at night.

In 2016, the intersection with NJ 109 was rebuilt to increase safety.

In 2017 the Cape May County Freeholders approved the purchase of E-ZPass equipment to be installed on the five toll bridges. The introduction of E-ZPass was originally planned for June 2017 but was then delayed multiple times. E-ZPass was implemented at the Ocean City-Longport Bridge on April 30, 2018, the Middle Thorofare Bridge on May 7, 2018, the Grassy Sound Bridge on May 14, 2018, and the Corsons Inlet Bridge and the Townsends Inlet Bridge on May 21, 2018. With this, tickets were discontinued.

On September 17, 2018, the Townsends Inlet Bridge closed for a $8.6 million project that reconstructed part of the bridge. Work was expected to open to traffic on May 22, 2019, however, this project was postponed due to more extensive work needing to be done. The original Townsends Inlet Bridge reopened on July 25, 2019.

In 2020, work was completed on renovations to the Middle Thorofare Bridge. The fender system was rebuilt, new piles and walers were built, and the bridge railing was replaced.

On August 18, 2024, the Middle Thorofare Bridge was closed after the drive shaft motor that is used to open the bridge failed and could not be repaired. The Cape May County Bridge Commission looked for a replacement for the motor, and the closure was expected to last at least several weeks. However, on August 21, 2024, the bridge reopened to traffic after getting a new motor and repairs were made.

In November 2024, the Cape May County Bridge Commission announced it was planning to implement all-electronic tolling along its five toll bridges, with them supporting E-ZPass or toll-by-plate. It is set to go live on May 10, 2025.

In May 2021, plans were announced to replace the Townsends Inlet Bridge with a new girder bridge. Despite its numerous repairs, it is deteriorating at a rapid rate, and is functionally obsolete. As of 2024, this has been expanded to include replacing the Corsons Inlet Bridge as well, as it is unable to lift its draw due to serious deterioration, this is in spite of being the second newest. There have also been plans proposed to replace the Middle Thoroughfare Bridge and Grassy Sound Bridge with new girder spans, as well as to replace the fenders on the Ocean city-Longport Bridge. There are not as urgently needed, though are likely to be necessary in the future.

== Major intersections ==
| County | Location | mi | km | Destinations | Notes |
|---|---|---|---|---|---|
| Cape May | Lower Township | 0.0 | 0.0 | Sunset Beach | Western terminus of CR 606, southern terminus of Ocean Drive |
| Cape May | Lower Township | 0.3 | 0.48 | CR 651 south (Cape Ave) | Branch of Ocean Drive follows CR 651 0.7 mi (1.13 km) into Cape May Point |
| Cape May | Lower Township | 0.4 | 0.64 | CR 629 south (Lighthouse Ave) | |
| Cape May | West Cape May | 1.5 | 2.4 | CR 607 north (Bayshore Rd) | |
| Cape May | West Cape May | 2.1 | 3.4 | CR 606 ends CR 626 north (Broadway) CR 633 north (Perry St) | Eastern terminus of CR 606, north end of the overlap with CR 606, south end of the overlap with CR 626 |
| Cape May | Cape May | 2.4 | 3.9 | CR 627 west (Mt. Vernon Ave) | |
| Cape May | Cape May | 2.5 | 4.0 | CR 626 begins CR 604 west (Beach Ave) | Southern terminus of CR 626, north end of the overlap with CR 626, south end of the overlap with CR 604 |
| Cape May | Cape May | 3.6 | 5.8 | CR 653 north (Madison Ave) | |
| Cape May | Cape May | 4.2 | 6.8 | CR 604 east (Beach Ave) CR 622 begins (Pittsburgh Ave) | Southern terminus of CR 622, north end of the overlap with CR 604, south end of the overlap with CR 622 |
| Cape May | Cape May | 4.8 | 7.7 | CR 640 east (Delaware Ave) | |
| Cape May | Cape May | 5.2 | 8.4 | CR 622 ends (Texas Ave) Route 109 south (Washington St) | Northern terminus of CR 622, north end of the overlap with CR 622, south end of the overlap with Route 109 |
| Cape May | Lower Township | 5.6 | 9.0 | Route 109 north to US 9 / G.S. Parkway north CR 621 begins | Southern terminus of CR 621, north end of the overlap with Route 109, south end of the overlap with CR 621, southern terminus of Ocean Drive signage |
| Cape May | Middle Thorofare | | | Middle Thorofare Bridge (southbound toll; E-ZPass or toll-by-plate) | |
| Cape May | Lower Township | | | CR 630 north (Fish Dock Rd) | |
| Cape May | Wildwood | 10.9 | 17.5 | Route 47 / CR 661 north (Rio Grande Ave) to G.S. Parkway | |
| Cape May | Wildwood | 11.9 | 19.2 | CR 614 west (Magnolia Ave) | |
| Cape May | North Wildwood | 13.4 | 21.6 | CR 621 ends Route 147 begins (New Jersey Ave) | Northern terminus of CR 621, eastern terminus of Route 147, north end of the overlap with CR 621, south end of the overlap with Route 147 |
| Cape May | Middle Township | 14.8 | 23.8 | Route 147 west (N Wildwood Blvd) to G.S. Parkway north CR 619 begins | Southern terminus of CR 619, north end of the overlap with Route 147, south end of the overlap with CR 619 |
| Cape May | Grassy Sound | | | Grassy Sound Bridge (northbound toll; E-ZPass or toll-by-plate) | |
| Cape May | Intracoastal Waterway | | | Stone Harbor Bridge | |
| Cape May | Stone Harbor | 18.2 | 29.3 | CR 657 north (96th St) | |
| Cape May | Avalon | 21.7 | 34.9 | CR 601 (Avalon Blvd) to G.S. Parkway | |
| Cape May | Townsends Inlet | | | Townsends Inlet Bridge (southbound toll; E-ZPass or toll-by-plate) | |
| Cape May | Sea Isle City | 26.4 | 42.5 | CR 625 west (John F. Kennedy Blvd) | |
| Cape May | Upper Township | 30.0 | 48.3 | CR 636 east (Commonwealth Ave) | |
| Cape May | Strathmere Bay | | | Strathmere Bascule Bridge (northbound toll; E-ZPass or toll-by-plate) | |
| Cape May | Corson Inlet | | | Corson’s Inlet Bridge | |
| Cape May | Ocean City | 32.4 | 52.1 | CR 619 Spur south (55th St) | |
| Cape May | Ocean City | 34.5 | 55.5 | CR 656 north (35th St) | |
| Cape May | Ocean City | 34.7 | 55.8 | CR 619 ends CR 623 east (34th St) | Northern terminus of CR 619, north end of the overlap with CR 619, south end of the overlap with CR 623 |
| Cape May | Ocean City | 34.8 | 56.0 | CR 623 west (Roosevelt Blvd) to G.S. Parkway CR 656 south (Bay Ave) | North end of the overlap with CR 623, south end of the overlap with CR 656 |
| Cape May | Ocean City | 37.5 | 60.4 | 9th St to Route 52 / G.S. Parkway | |
| Cape May | Ocean City | 39.8 | 64.1 | CR 656 ends (Gardens Pkwy) | North end of the overlap with CR 656 |
| Great Egg Harbor Bay | | 39.8 | 64.1 | Ocean City-Longport Bridge (southbound toll; E-ZPass or toll-by-plate) | |
| Atlantic | Longport | 41.0 | 66.0 | Route 152 west to G.S. Parkway – Somers Point | South end of the overlap with Route 152, northern terminus of Ocean Drive signage |
| Atlantic | Longport | 41.9 | 67.4 | Route 152 ends CR 629 begins (Ventnor Ave) | Eastern terminus of Route 152, north end of the overlap with Route 152, south end of the overlap with CR 629 |
| Atlantic | Margate City | 43.6 | 70.2 | CR 563 north (Jerome Ave) to G.S. Parkway | |
| Atlantic | Ventnor City | 45.3 | 72.9 | CR 629 north (Dorset Ave) | North end of the overlap with CR 629 |
| Atlantic | Atlantic City | 46.7 | 75.2 | US 40 west / US 322 west (Albany Ave) | Eastern termini of US 40 and US 322 |
| Atlantic | Atlantic City | 46.9 | 75.5 | Atlantic Ave | North end of the overlap with Ventnor Avenue, south end of the overlap with Atlantic Avenue |
| Atlantic | Atlantic City | 47.7– 47.8 | 76.8– 76.9 | Arkansas Ave to A.C. Expressway / G.S. Parkway – Philadelphia, Camden | |
| Atlantic | Atlantic City | 49.3 | 79.3 | N Maine Ave | Northern terminus of Ocean Drive and Atlantic Avenue |
1.000 mi = 1.609 km; 1.000 km = 0.621 mi: Concurrency terminus; Electronic toll collection
