= List of county routes in Cape May County, New Jersey =

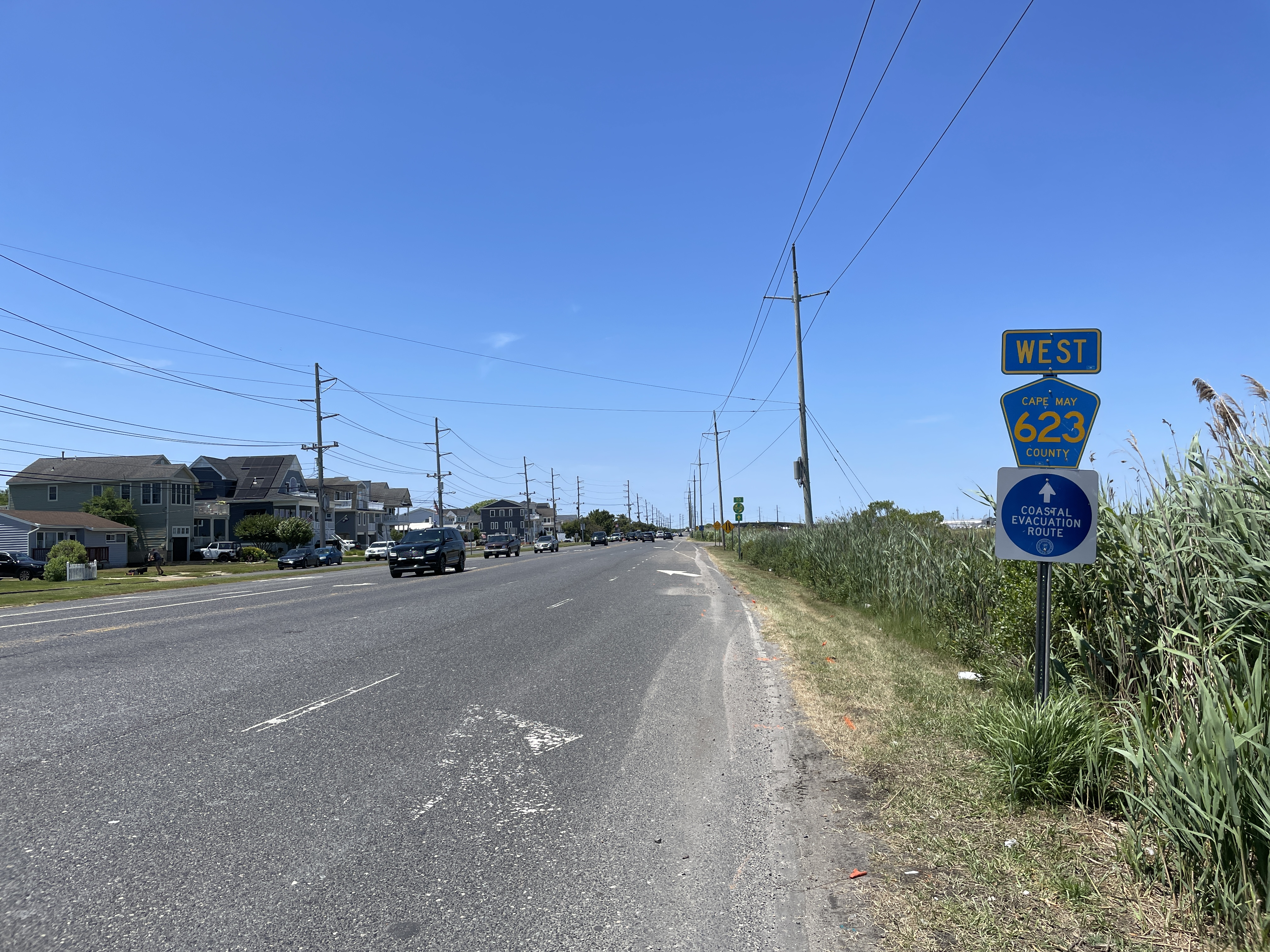
CR 623 westbound past CR 656 in Ocean City

The following is a list of county routes in Cape May County in the U.S. state of New Jersey. For more information on the county route system in New Jersey as a whole, including its history, see County routes in New Jersey.

== 500-series county routes ==
In addition to those listed below, the following 500-series county routes serve Cape May County:

- CR 548, CR 550, CR 550 Spur, CR 557

== Other county routes ==
Route	Length (mi)	Length (km)	From	Via	To	Notes
CR 601	3.95	6.36	Shore Road (US 9) in Middle Township	Avalon Boulevard, 30th Street	Dune Drive and 30th Street in Avalon	
CR 602	0.83	1.34	Shore Road (US 9) in Upper Township	Church Road	Tuckahoe Road (CR 631) in Upper Township	
CR 603	8.18	13.16	Seashore Road (Route 162/CR 626) in Lower Township	Jonathan Hoffman Boulevard, Bayshore Road	Delsea Drive (Route 47) in Middle Township	
CR 604	2.28	3.67	Dead end in West Cape May	Beach Avenue	Wilmington Avenue in Cape May	
CR 605	3.37	5.42	Woodbine Avenue (CR 550) and Hands Mill Road (CR 550) in Dennis Township	Belleplain Road	Weatherby Road (CR 548) in Upper Township	
CR 606	2.19	3.52	Dead end in Lower Township	Sunset Boulevard	Lafayette Street (Route 109) in Cape May	
CR 607	2.04	3.28	Sunset Boulevard (CR 606) on the Lower Township/West Cape May border	Bayshore Road	Dead end along the Cape May Canal in Lower Township	
CR 608	3.35	5.39	Route 83 in Dennis Township	Kings Highway	Woodbine–Ocean View Road (CR 550) in Dennis Township	
CR 609	1.08	1.74	Shore Road (US 9) and North Main Street (US 9) in Middle Township	Crest Haven Road	Dead end in Middle Township	
CR 610	7.77	12.50	Delsea Drive (Route 47) in Dennis Township	Petersburg Road, Dennisville–Petersburg Road	Tuckahoe Road (CR 631) in Upper Township	
CR 611	2.93	4.72	Delsea Drive (Route 47) in Dennis Township	Tyler Road	Washington Avenue (CR 557) in Woodbine	
CR 612	2.88	4.63	Delsea Drive (Route 47) in Middle Township	Dias Creek Road	Mechanic Street (CR 615) and Goshen Road (CR 615) in Middle Township	
CR 613	2.31	3.72	Bayshore Road (CR 603) in Lower Township	Breakwater Road	Shore Road (US 9) in Lower Township	
CR 614	1.23	1.98	Dead end in West Wildwood	Glenwood Avenue, Magnolia Avenue	New Jersey Avenue (CR 621) in Wildwood	
CR 615	4.64	7.47	North Main Street (US 9) and South Main Street (US 9) in Middle Township	Mechanic Street, Goshen Road, Goshen–Swainton Road	Delsea Drive (Route 47) in Middle Township	
CR 616	2.36	3.80	Route 50 in Upper Township	Tyler Road	Tuckahoe Road (CR 631) in Upper Township	
CR 617	0.23	0.37	Woodbine Road (CR 557) and Mill Road (CR 557) in Upper Township	Woodbine Road	Route 49 in Upper Township	
CR 618	3.17	5.10	Delsea Drive (Route 47) in Middle Township	Indian Trail Road	Shore Road (US 9), South Main Street (US 9), and North Wildwood Boulevard (Route 147) in Middle Township	
CR 619	19.88	31.99	North Wildwood Boulevard (Route 147) in Middle Township	Ocean Drive, 3rd Avenue, Landis Avenue, Commonwealth Avenue, Bay Avenue, 55th Street, West Avenue	34th Street (CR 623) in Ocean City	
CR 619 Spur	0.10	0.16	55th Street (CR 619 and West Avenue (CR 619) in Ocean City	55th Street	Central Avenue in Ocean City	
CR 620	2.70	4.35	Indian Trail Road (CR 618) in Middle Township	Shunpike Road	Dias Creek Road (CR 612) in Middle Township	
CR 621	7.79	12.54	Route 109 in Lower Township	Ocean Drive, Pacific Avenue, Rambler Road, New Jersey Avenue	Route 147 in North Wildwood	
CR 622	1.03	1.66	Beach Avenue (CR 604) in Cape May	Pittsburgh Avenue, Texas Avenue	Washington Street (Route 109) in Cape May	
CR 623	2.63	4.23	Old Tuckahoe Road (CR 662) in Upper Township	Roosevelt Boulevard, 34th Street	Central Avenue in Ocean City	
CR 624 (1)	0.58	0.93	Wildwood Boulevard (Route 47) in Lower Township	Old Rio Grande Avenue	Dead end in Lower Township	
CR 624 (2)	0.14	0.23	Dead end in Lower Township	West Rio Grande Avenue	Wildwood Boulevard (Route 47) in Wildwood	
CR 625	2.78	4.47	Shore Road (US 9) in Dennis Township	Sea Isle Boulevard, John F. Kennedy Boulevard	Landis Avenue (CR 619) in Sea Isle City	
CR 626	7.75	12.47	Beach Avenue (CR 604) in Cape May	Broadway, Seashore Road, Railroad Avenue, Satt Boulevard	Delsea Drive (Route 47) in Middle Township	
CR 627	0.16	0.26	Dead end in Cape May	Mount Vernon Avenue	Broadway (CR 626) in Cape May	
CR 628	6.75	10.86	Route 83 in Dennis Township	Dennisville Road, Corsons Tavern Road	Route 50 in Upper Township	
CR 629	0.75	1.21	Lincoln Avenue (CR 651) in Cape May Point	Lighthouse Avenue	Sunset Boulevard (CR 606) on the Cape May Point/Lower Township border	
CR 630	0.23	0.37	Ocean Drive (CR 621) and Pacific Avenue (CR 621) in Lower Township	Fish Dock Road	Dead end in Lower Township	
CR 631	5.35	8.61	Route 50 in Upper Township	Tuckahoe Road	Shore Road (US 9) in Upper Township	
CR 632	1.23	1.98	Route 49 in Upper Township	Marshallville Road	Dead end in Upper Township	
CR 633	0.34	0.55	Sunset Boulevard (CR 606) and Broadway (CR 626) in West Cape May	West Perry Street, Lafayette Street	Lafayette Street (Route 109) in Cape May	Signage continues north along Route 109 to the border with Lower Township
CR 634	0.55	0.89	Shore Road (US 9) in Middle Township	Rio Grande Avenue	Delsea Drive (Route 47) in Middle Township	
CR 635	0.70	1.13	Bayshore Road (CR 607) in West Cape May	4th Avenue	Broadway (CR 626) in West Cape May	
CR 636	0.19	0.31	Commonwealth Avenue (CR 619) and Bay Avenue (CR 619) in Upper Township	Commonwealth Avenue	Seaview Avenue in Upper Township	Returned to Upper Township by 2005
CR 637	1.75	2.82	Shore Road (US 9) in Upper Township	Butter Road	Tuckahoe Road (CR 631) in Upper Township	
CR 638	3.51	5.65	Petersburg Road (CR 610) in Dennis Township	Fidler Road, Webster Street	Washington Avenue (CR 550/CR 557) and Webster Street (CR 550) in Woodbine	
CR 639	2.35	3.78	Seashore Road (CR 626) in Lower Township	Academy Road, Fishing Creek Road	Bayshore Road (CR 603) in Lower Township	
CR 640	0.71	1.14	Pittsburgh Avenue (CR 622) in Cape May	Delaware Avenue	Buffalo Avenue in Cape May	
CR 641	1.01	1.63	Bayshore Road (CR 607) in Lower Township	Seashore Road, New England Road	Seashore Road (Route 162/CR 626) in Lower Township	
CR 642	0.51	0.82	Dead end in Middle Township	Millman Boulevard	Bayshore Road (CR 603) in Middle Township	
CR 643	1.49	2.40	Delsea Drive (Route 47) in Middle Township	Springers Mill Road	Dias Creek Road (CR 612) in Middle Township	
CR 644	2.66	4.28	Jonathan Hoffman Boulevard (CR 603) in Lower Township	Shunpike Road	Breakwater Road (CR 613) in Lower Township	
CR 645	0.60	0.97	Bayshore Road (CR 607) on the Lower Township/West Cape May border	Stimpson Lane	Seashore Road (CR 626) on the Lower Township/West Cape May border	
CR 646	3.43	5.52	Goshen Road (CR 615) and Goshen–Swainton Road (CR 615) in Middle Township	Goshen–Swainton Road	Shore Road (US 9) in Middle Township	
CR 647	1.12	1.80	Fishing Creek Road (CR 639) in Lower Township	Tabernacle Road	Seashore Road (CR 626) in Lower Township	
CR 648	2.39	3.85	Shore Drive in Lower Township	Town Bank Road	Seashore Road (CR 626) in Lower Township	
CR 649	1.15	1.85	Stimpson Lane (CR 645) on the Lower Township/West Cape May border	Shunpike Road	Dead end along the Cape May Canal in Lower Township	
CR 650	0.30	0.48	Delsea Drive (Route 47) in Middle Township	William Street	Goshen Road (CR 615) in Middle Township	Returned to Middle Township by 2005
CR 651	1.12	1.80	Lighthouse Avenue (CR 629) in Cape May Point	Lincoln Avenue, Cape Avenue	Sunset Boulevard (CR 606) on the Cape May Point/Lower Township border	
CR 652	0.98	1.58	Shore Road (US 9) in Middle Township	Siegtown Road	Goshen–Swainton Road (CR 646) in Middle Township	
CR 653	0.66	1.06	Beach Avenue (CR 604) in Cape May	Madison Avenue	Lafayette Street (Route 109/CR 633) in Cape May	
CR 654	2.46	3.96	Bayshore Road (CR 603) in Lower Township	Fulling Mill Road	Delsea Drive (Route 47) in Middle Township	
CR 655	1.00	1.61	North Beach Drive and South Beach Drive in Middle Township	Reeds Beach Road	Delsea Drive (Route 47) in Middle Township	
CR 656	5.16	8.30	West Avenue (CR 619) in Ocean City	35th Street, Bay Avenue, Battersea Road, Wesley Road, Gardens Parkway	Atlantic County line on the Ocean City–Longport Bridge in Ocean City	
CR 657	9.71	15.63	3rd Avenue (CR 619) in Stone Harbor	96th Street, Stone Harbor Boulevard, Court House–South Dennis Road, Court House–Dennisville Road	Delsea Drive (Route 47) in Dennis Township	
CR 658	3.02	4.86	Delsea Drive (Route 47) in Middle Township	West Hand Avenue	South Main Street (US 9) in Middle Township	
CR 659	0.30	0.48	Mill Road (CR 557) in Upper Township	Railroad Avenue	Route 49 in Upper Township	
CR 660	0.82	1.32	Fidler Road (CR 638) in Woodbine	Fidler Hill Road	Dehirsch Avenue (CR 550) in Woodbine	
CR 661	0.39	0.63	Susquehanna Avenue in Wildwood	Rio Grande Avenue	New Jersey Avenue (CR 621) in Wildwood	Concurrently with Route 47 its entire length
CR 662	0.68	1.09	Tuckahoe Road (CR 631) in Upper Township	South Old Tuckahoe Road, North Old Tuckahoe Road	Shore Road in Upper Township	
CR 663	0.85	1.37	Crest Haven Road (CR 609) in Middle Township	Moore Road	Dead end in Middle Township	
CR 664	3.50	5.63	Dennisville–Petersburg Road (CR 610) in Upper Township	Tuckahoe–Mount Pleasant Road	Route 50 in Upper Township	
CR 665	0.4	0.64	North Wildwood Boulevard (Route 147) in Middle Township	Old North Wildwood Boulevard	Dead end in Middle Township	Former CR 585
CR 666	0.31	0.50	Dead end in Middle Township	Old North Wildwood Boulevard	Ocean Drive (CR 619) in Middle Township	Former CR 585
CR 667	4.37	7.03	Hope Corson Road (CR 671) in Upper Township	Stagecoach Road	North Old Tuckahoe Road (CR 662) in Upper Township	
CR 668	1.27	2.04	Kings Highway (CR 608) in Dennis Township	Main Street	Shore Road (US 9) in Dennis Township	
CR 669	0.19	0.31	Mount Pleasant–Tuckahoe Road (CR 664) in Upper Township	Marshall Avenue	Route 50 in Upper Township	
CR 670	2.85	4.59	Route 47 in Dennis Township	East Creek Mill Road	Cumberland County line in Dennis Township	Concurrently with Route 347 for its entire length
CR 671	0.76	1.22	Route 50 in Upper Township	Hope Corson Road	Shore Road (US 9) in Upper Township	
CR 672	0.24	0.39	Atlantic Cape Community College in Middle Township	College Drive	Court House–South Dennis Road (CR 657) in Middle Township	
CR 673	0.58	0.93	Mechanic Street (CR 615) in Middle Township	Reading Avenue, Magnolia Drive	Court House–South Dennis Road (CR 657) in Middle Township	
CR 674	0.14	0.23	South Main Street (US 9) in Middle Township	Shell Bay Avenue	Golf Club Road and Bayberry Drive in Middle Township	
