= New Jersey Route 147 =

State highway in Cape May County, New Jersey, United States

Route 147

Route information
- Maintained by NJDOT
- Length: 4.2 mi (6.8 km)
- Existed: November 1, 1971–present

Major junctions
- West end: US 9 in Middle Township
- G.S. Parkway in Middle Township; CR 619 / Ocean Drive in Middle Township
- East end: CR 621 / Ocean Drive in North Wildwood

Location
- Country: United States
- State: New Jersey
- Counties: Cape May

Highway system
- New Jersey State Highway Routes; Interstate; US; State; Scenic Byways
← Route 143	→ Route 151

Route 147 is a 4.2-mile (6.76 km) state highway located in Cape May County in New Jersey, United States. It is a short connector between US 9 in Middle Township and North Wildwood at the intersection of New York Avenue. West of US 9, the road continues toward Route 47 on Indian Trail Road (CR 618). This route along with Route 147 provides an alternate route to The Wildwoods from Route 47. East of New York Avenue, the route continues south through The Wildwoods as CR 621. The route passes through mostly marshland along its journey, interchanging with the Garden State Parkway at a partial interchange with Ocean Drive (CR 619).

The portion of the route east of the intersection with the latter forms a part of Ocean Drive. When the 500-series county routes were established in New Jersey in the 1950s, what is now Route 147 became a part of CR 585, a route running from Lower Township north to Absecon. On November 1, 1971, Route 147 was designated along CR 585 between US 9 and the North Wildwood border. The route was extended to its current location in North Wildwood by the 1990s.

== Route description ==
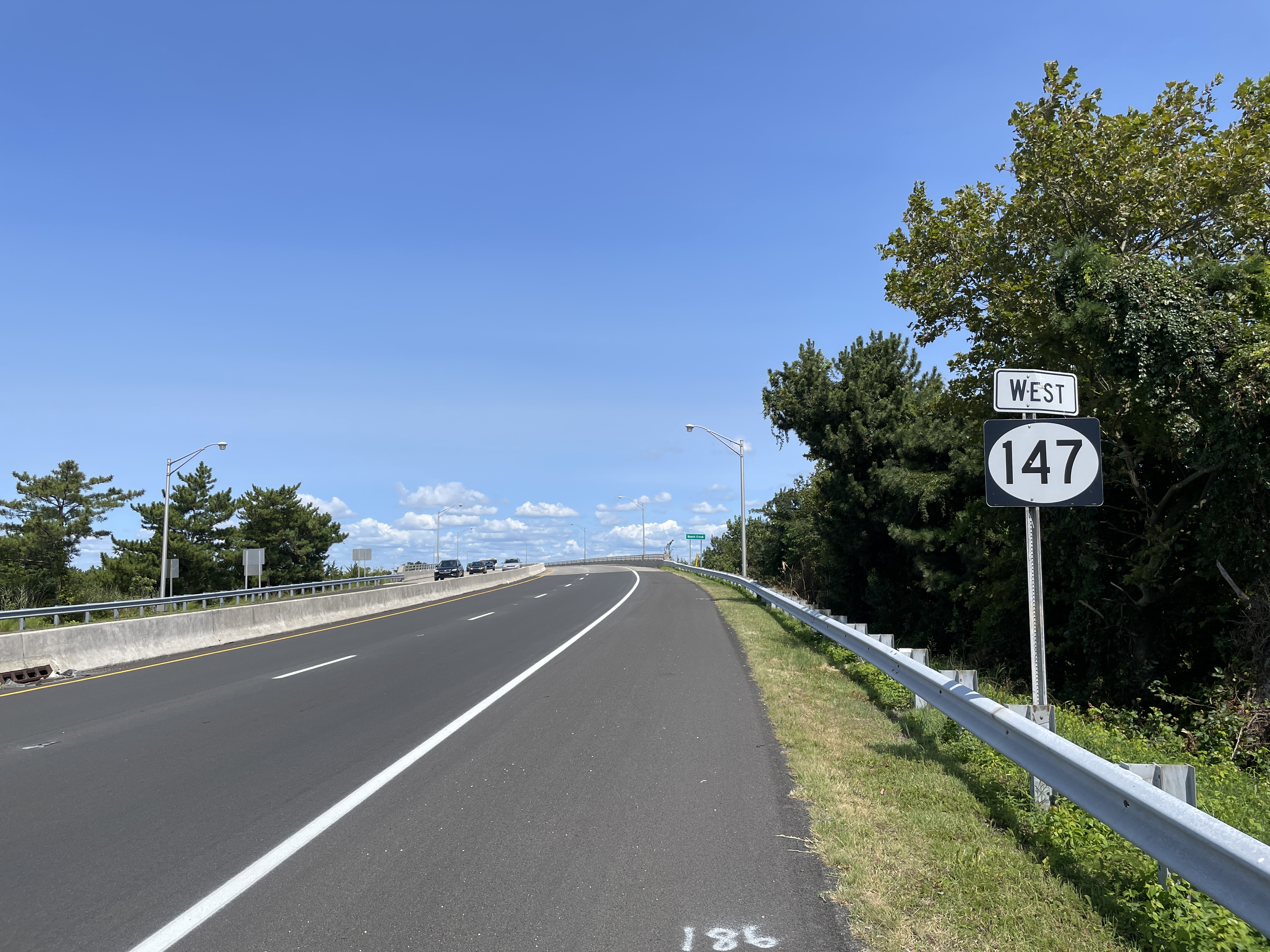
Route 147 westbound approaching the Beach Creek bridge in North Wildwood

Route 147 begins at an intersection of US 9 in the Whitesboro-Burleigh section of Middle Township, heading to the east along North Wildwood Boulevard, a two-lane undivided road. The road continues to the west of US 9 on Indian Trail Road (CR 618) to Route 47. The road passes residences and businesses to the north and woodland to the south before coming to a partial cloverleaf interchange with the Garden State Parkway that has access to the northbound direction of the parkway and from the southbound direction of the parkway.

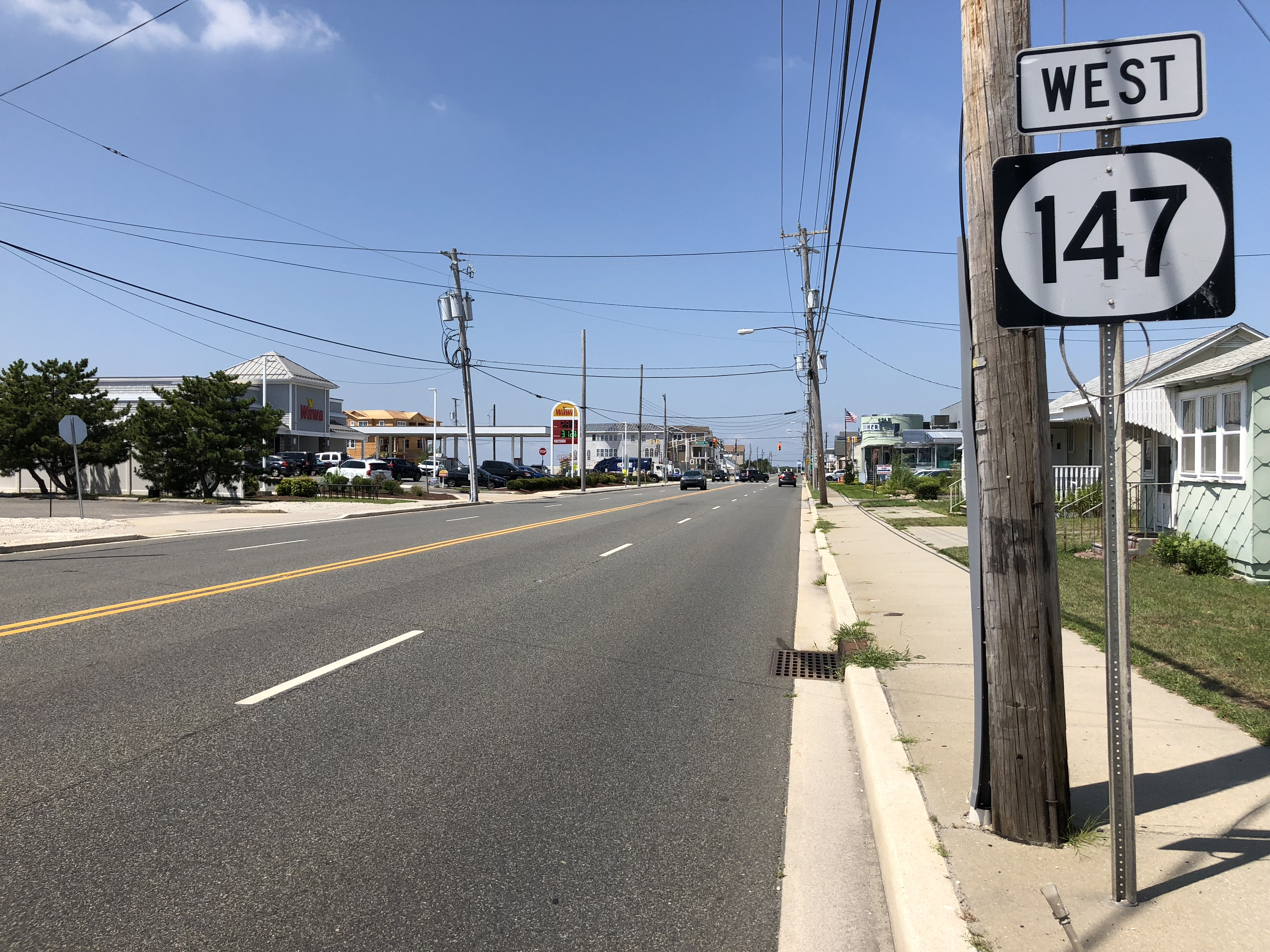
View west along Route 147 at Delaware Avenue in North Wildwood

Past the Garden State Parkway, Route 147 becomes a four-lane divided highway that briefly passes more homes and commercial establishments before entering a delta-type series of marshy rivers and inlets. It turns to the southeast and comes to an intersection of Old North Wildwood Boulevard (CR 665) before crossing the Grassy Sound on a bridge. After the bridge, the route comes to an intersection of Ocean Drive (CR 619).

At this point, the Ocean Drive moniker merges onto Route 147 and the road crosses over the Beach Creek into the Jersey Shore city of North Wildwood. Here, the route turns south and becomes Spruce Avenue, which heads between marshland to the west and homes to the east. At the intersection of West Angelsea Drive, Route 147 becomes a four-lane undivided road that continues past more developments, turning to the southeast. Route 147 heads through a mix of residential and commercial establishments before ending at the intersection of New York Avenue. From here, CR 621 continues south along the roadway as New Jersey Avenue. Route 147, along with CR 618, provide an alternate route to The Wildwoods from Route 47.

== History ==
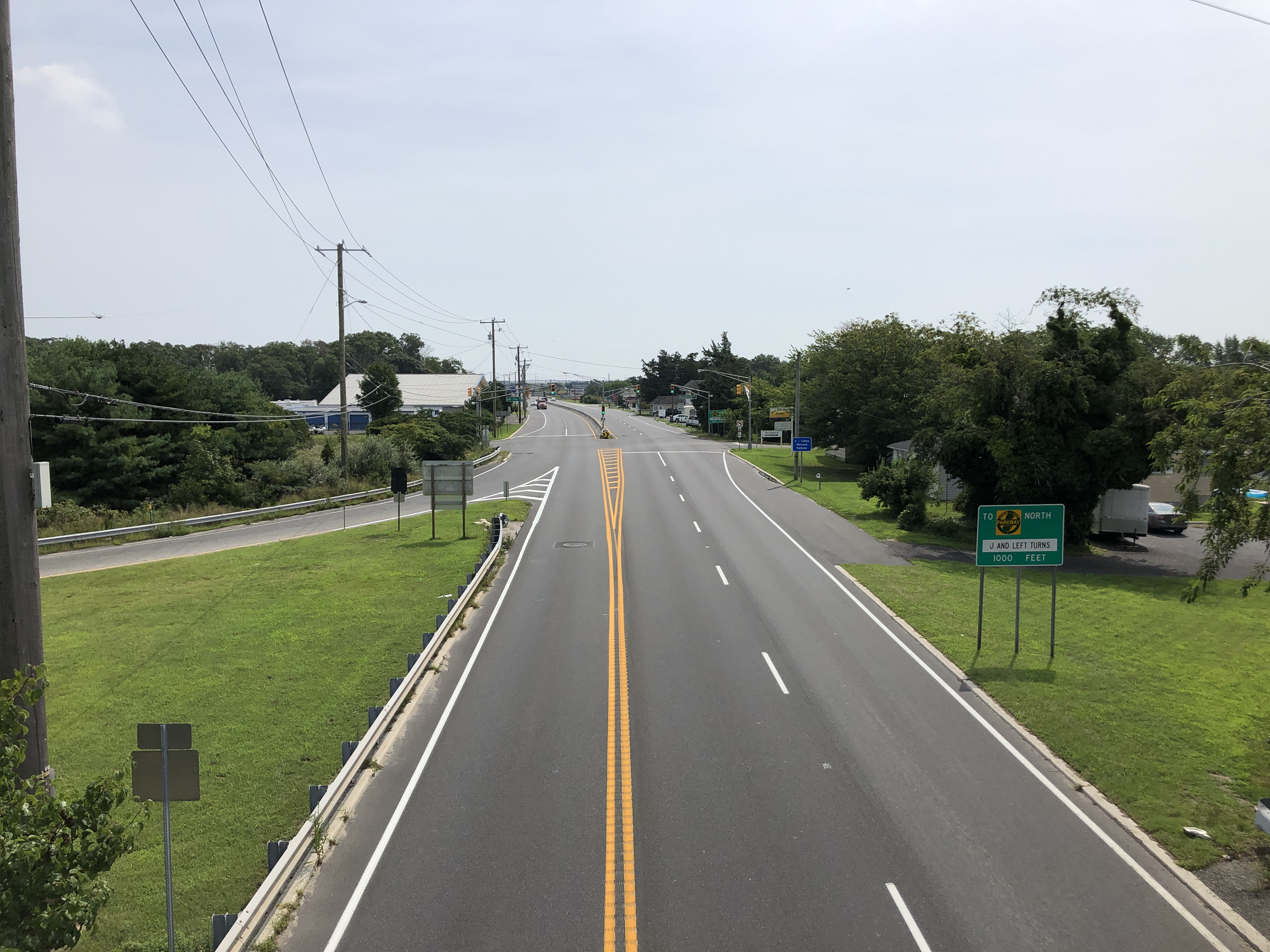
Route 147 eastbound past the Garden State Parkway in Middle Township

What is now Route 147 was an unimproved road back in 1927. When the 500-series county routes were established in the 1950s, this road became a part of CR 585, a route that ran from Route 109 (then a part of US 9) in Lower Township north to US 30 and Route 157 in Absecon. The route was also designated as part of CR 18, which continued west past US 9 to Route 47. On November 1, 1971, Route 147 was designated to replace the portion of CR 18/CR 585 between US 9 in Burleigh and the North Wildwood border. In 1994, the current fixed-span steel girder bridge over the Grassy Sound was built. As a result of the bridge replacement, Route 147 was realigned off its former drawbridge, and the former alignment became CR 665. The southern terminus of CR 585 was eventually truncated its current location at Route 52 in Somers Point. By the 1990s, Route 147 was extended to its current eastern terminus at the intersection of New York Avenue in North Wildwood.

In 2020, the New Jersey Turnpike Authority proposed a $10 million project to reconstruct the partial interchange between Route 147 and the Garden State Parkway into a full interchange.

== Major intersections ==
The entire route is in Cape May County.

Location	mi	km	Destinations	Notes
Middle Township	0.0	0.0	US 9 – Whitesboro, Cape May Court House CR 618 west (Indian Trail Rd) – Dias Creek	Western terminus; access to Cooper University Hospital Cape Regional Eastern terminus of CR 618
Middle Township	0.3	0.48	G.S. Parkway north	Exit 6 (Garden State Parkway); access eastbound Route 147 to the northbound direction of the Garden State Parkway via a u-turn
Middle Township	2.8	4.5	CR 619 north / Ocean Drive north – Stone Harbor	West end of the overlap with Ocean Drive; southern terminus of CR 619
North Wildwood	4.2	6.8	CR 621 south / Ocean Drive south (New Jersey Ave)	Eastern terminus; east end of the overlap with Ocean Drive; northern terminus of CR 621
1.000 mi = 1.609 km; 1.000 km = 0.621 mi: Concurrency terminus
