= Seaview Harbor, New Jersey =

Populated place in Atlantic County, New Jersey, US

- Unincorporated community
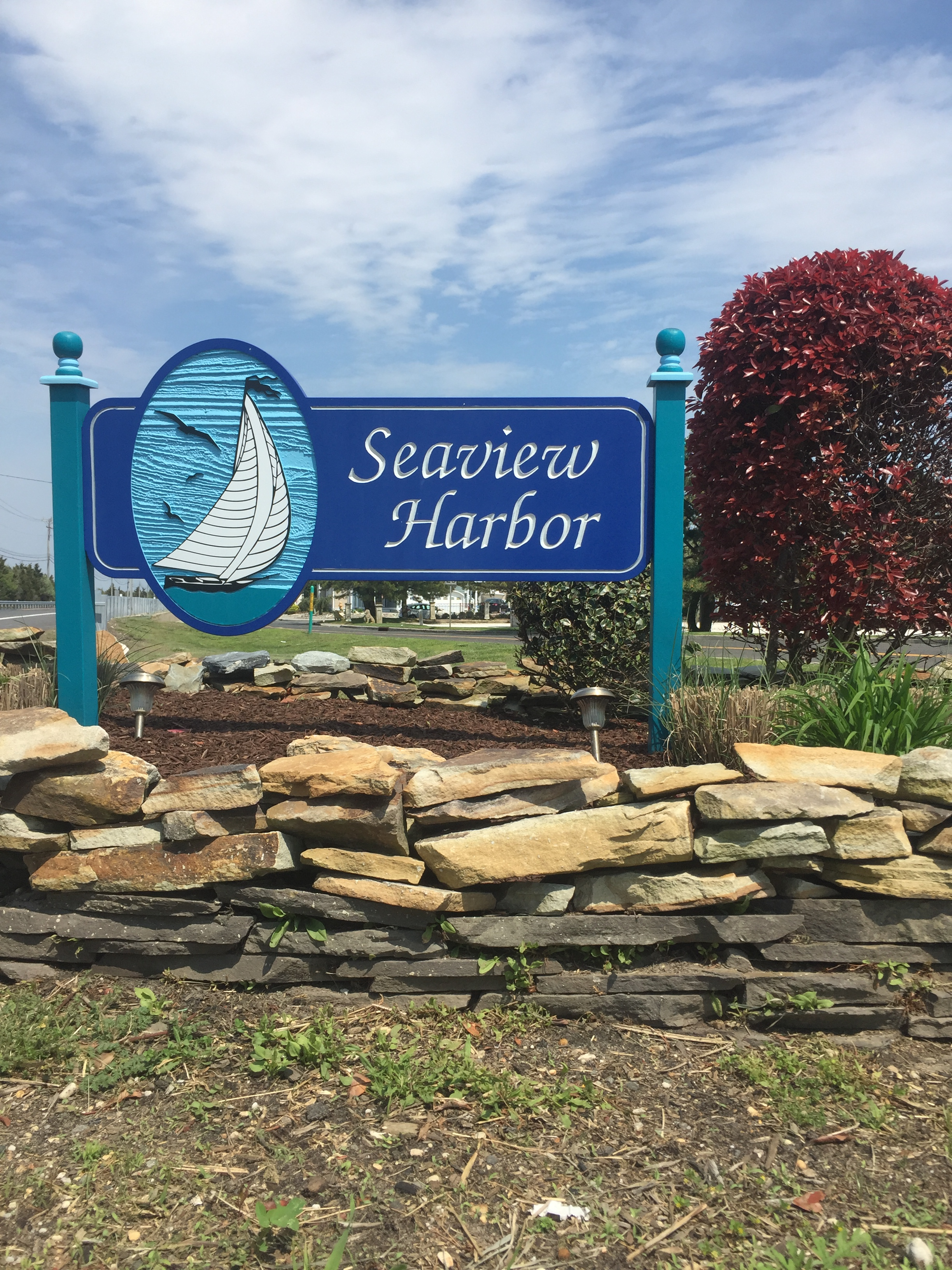
- Sign for the community near Somers Point-Longport Blvd.

- Location in Atlantic County (Inset: Location of county within the state of New Jersey) Seaview Harbor (New Jersey) Seaview Harbor (the United States)
- Coordinates: 39°18′50″N 74°32′01″W
- Country: United States
- State: New Jersey
- County: Atlantic
- Township: Egg Harbor

Area
  - Land: 0.11 sq mi (0.29 km^{2})
- Elevation: 3.3 ft (1 m)
- Postal code: 08403
- GNIS feature ID: 874146

Seaview Harbor is a harbor and an unincorporated community located within Egg Harbor Township in Atlantic County, in the U.S. state of New Jersey.

== Location ==
Located along New Jersey Route 152 (NJ 152), Seaview Harbor borders the Great Egg Harbor Bay, and is separated from neighboring Longport by Beach Thorofare. The harbor community is non-contiguous from the rest of Egg Harbor Township, separated from municipal facilities by about 10 mi (16 km). Seaview Harbor shares a ZIP Code with neighboring Longport, whose postmaster handles mail for the community. Longport also provides first response for fire and medical emergencies, as well as most police matters, at no cost to the township.

== History ==
Seaview Harbor subdivision was first envisioned in 1957 as a "planned community for the boating family", and housing units were gradually added. In the 1960s and 1970s, storms damaged bulkheads in the community, forcing residents to finance their own breakwater. By the mid-1970s, Egg Harbor Township began providing trash pickup. The township installed a public sewer system by 1994. In 2009, a traffic light was installed at the intersection of Sunset Boulevard and NJ 152.

Within Seaview Harbor, there are currently 92 single-family homes, two vacant residential lots, a utility lot, and Seaview Harbor Marina. The namesake marina has 300 slips, a restaurant, a store, a fuel dock, and a private beach. The properties of Seaview Harbor, representing an area of 70.9 acres (28.7 ha), is assessed at over $100 million.

In 2012, a tax reevaluation rose taxes in Seaview Harbor by 60%. In 2014, 69 residents of Seaview Harbor submitted a petition to leave Egg Harbor Township and join nearby Longport. This represented about 80% of registered voters in the community. Among the concerns was confusion and lost mail, due to uncertainty whether the area was a part of Longport or Egg Harbor Township, as well as the high taxes. Over two years, the township held 25 meetings exploring the community's deannexation, at the cost of $87,800 in legal and engineering fees. Longtime Egg Harbor Township mayor James J. McCullough lives in Seaview Harbor, and recused himself from the secession hearings. The mayor of Longport, Nicholas Russo, was neutral on the matter. A 500-page report released in January 2016 concluded that Seaview Harbor did not meet the criteria to secede from the township. The report cited the lack of continuity with Longport, as the only connection is NJ 152. The secession would also negatively impact the rest of Egg Harbor Township, including a $505,000 loss in taxes. On November 30, 2016, the Egg Harbor Township Committee voted 4-0 to deny the deannexation.
