= New Jersey Route 152 =

State highway in Atlantic County, New Jersey, US

Route 152
- Longport-Somers Point Boulevard

Route information
- Maintained by NJDOT
- Length: 3.16 mi (5.09 km)
- Existed: 1969–present

Major junctions
- West end: CR 620 in Somers Point
- East end: CR 629 in Egg Harbor Township

Location
- Country: United States
- State: New Jersey
- Counties: Atlantic

Highway system
- New Jersey State Highway Routes; Interstate; US; State; Scenic Byways
← Route 151	→ Route 153

Route 152 is a 3.16-mile-long (5.09 km) state highway in Atlantic County, New Jersey, United States. Route 152 begins at Bay Avenue in Somers Point as a continuation of County Route 620 (CR 620). The route heads along two causeways, ending at the foot of the John F. Kennedy Memorial Bridge over the Intracoastal Waterway in Egg Harbor Township, where the state turns maintenance back to Atlantic County as CR 629 to Longport.

Route 152 originates as an alignment of County Route 20, which ran along the entire alignment of Route 152 from Somers Point to Longport. The state took over CR 20 in 1969, designating the route as Route 152 in relation to the Route 52 designation further south. In 1988, the former bridge over the Broad Thoroughfare was demolished and replaced by the Dolores G. Cooper Bridge.

== Route description ==
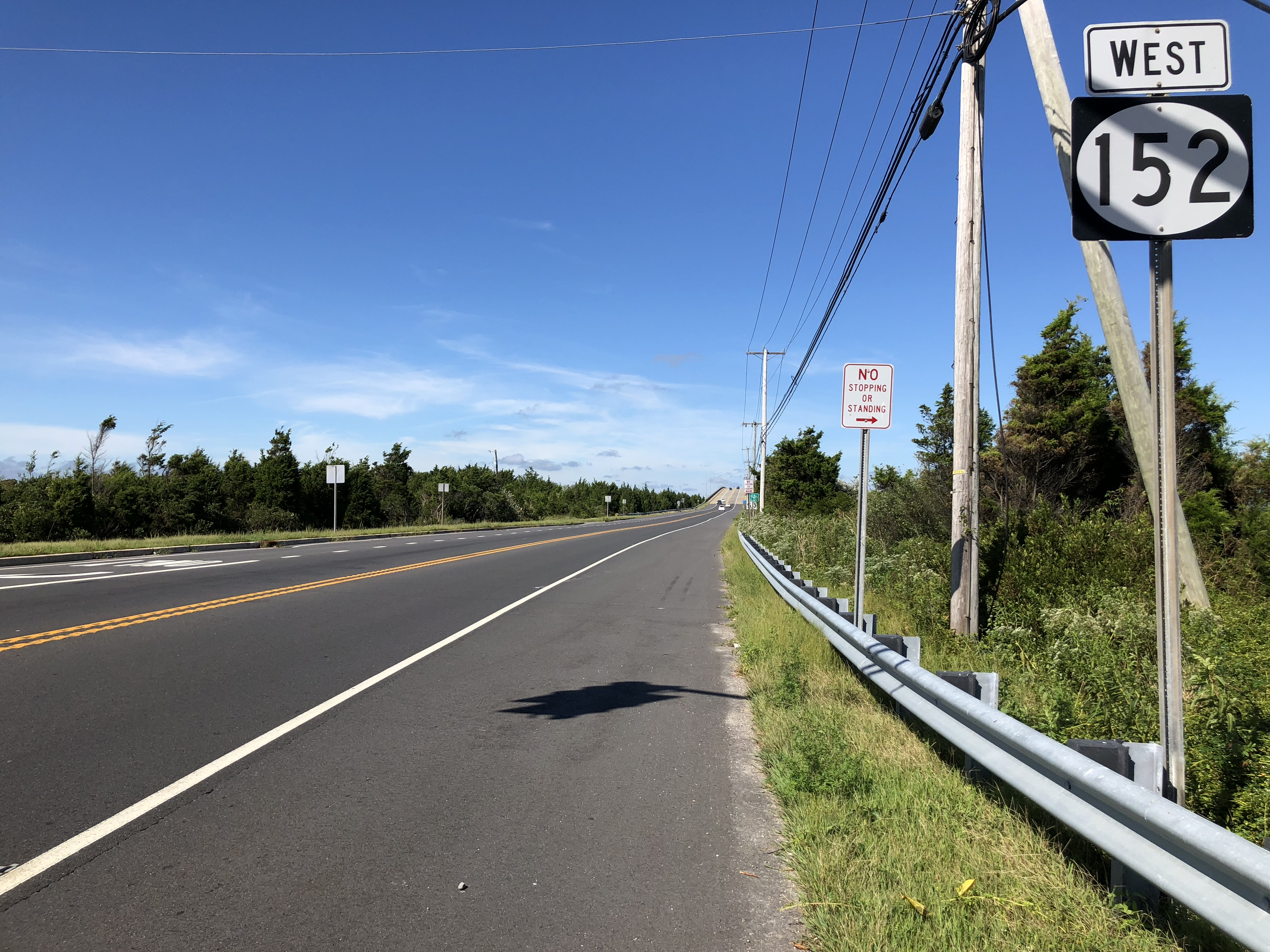
Route 152 heading westward towards the Broad Thoroughfare bridge

Route 152 begins at an intersection with CR 620 (West Maryland Avenue) and Bay Avenue in the city of Somers Point. The route heads eastward, passing to the north of a local marina as East Maryland Avenue, crossing over Bass Harbor Creek soon after. Just after crossing the creek, Route 152 leaves Somers Point, entering the community of Egg Harbor Township. On the other side of the creek, Route 152 becomes known as Longport–Somers Point Boulevard and heads along a causeway through Egg Harbor Township. The route passes to the north of a marina, curving soon after at an intersection with Anchorage Drive, which is a connector road to waterside residential homes. Route 152 continues eastward, crossing over several streams and passing to the north of a large estate. The route remains a two-lane causeway for a distance, intersecting with its former alignment to the south, which parallels the current route. Route 152 then rises in elevation as it heads onto the newer causeway (known as the Dolores G. Cooper Bridge), passing a lone fishing pier. After crossing over the Cooper Bridge, the highway parallels its former alignment for a short distance, intersecting with the Ocean Drive/Ocean City–Longport Boulevard. Route 152 heads along the Broad Thoroughfare as a three-lane waterside arterial boulevard. The route leaves the shoreline, running along the sandy surroundings. The route reaches Seaview Harbor, served by an intersection with Sunset Boulevard and Seaview Boulevard. Route 152 turns eastward, reaching the foot of the John F. Kennedy Memorial Bridge. There, the state designation ends, and it continues as CR 629 (Ventnor Avenue) into the borough of Longport.

The entire span of the Longport Bridge is accessible to pedestrians, runners, and bicycles, with dedicated lanes on each side. The bridge has been a featured route in running, walking, and cycling events including the Bike MS: City to Shore Ride.

== History ==
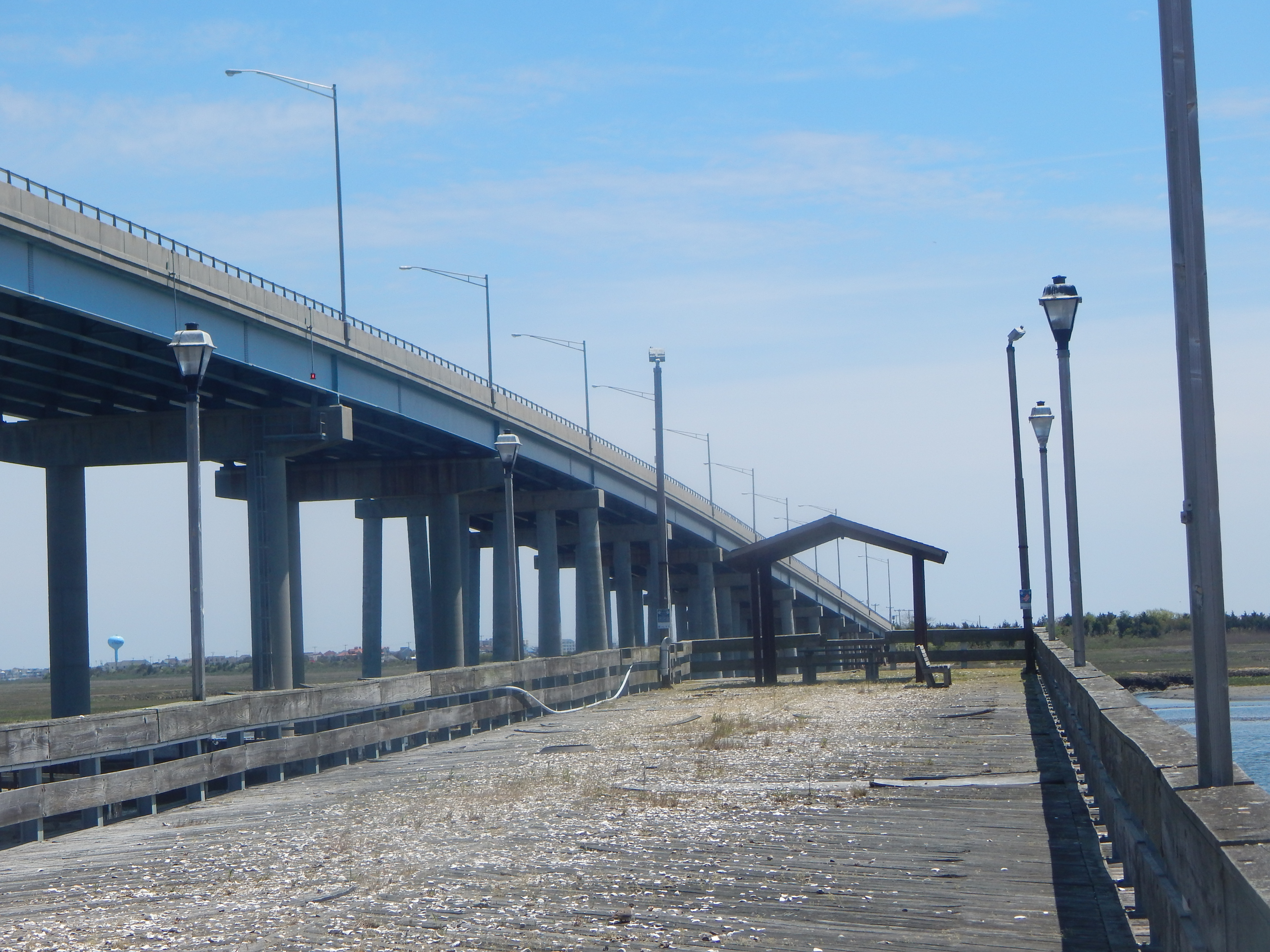
The old alignment of Route 152, now a fishing pier

In 1916, the causeway connecting Somers Point and Longport opened. The current alignment of Route 152 originates as a state takeover of CR 20, which was first brought to the floor of the New Jersey State Legislature in 1968. The state approved the measure, and effective January 19, 1969, the New Jersey Department of Transportation took over maintenance of CR 20. The alignment was designated as Route 152, numbered after nearby Route 52 to the south in Somers Point and Ocean City.

Route 152 originally went along a lower wooden bridge across the Broad Thoroughfare. At least six people drowned from traffic accidents along the bridge from 1976 to 1986. Atlantic County Assemblywoman Dolores G. Cooper helped secure state funding for a new bridge, which opened September 1988 at a cost of $21 million. The new 2,860-foot-long (870 m) bridge was completed to the north of the former route. The former alignment to the south, designated as Old Road, is currently being demolished with the former fishing pier as of 2017. The route has remained intact virtually since 1988. In 1994, the new bridge was named the Dolores G. Cooper Bridge.

The original alignment of Route 152 was designated by 1953 from Route 29 (which at the time went east via Memorial Drive and Lafayette Street to U.S. Route 206, US 206) in Trenton to US 1 in Trenton. This became part of rerouted Route 29 by 1969, while the old route of Route 29 was given to the city.

== Major intersections ==
The entire route is in Atlantic County.

Location	mi	km	Destinations	Notes
Somers Point	0.00	0.00	CR 620 west (Maryland Avenue)	Continuation past terminus
Somers Point	0.00	0.00	Bay Avenue	Western terminus
Broad Thorofare	1.33– 1.89	2.14– 3.04	Dolores G. Cooper Bridge	
Egg Harbor Township	2.17	3.49	Ocean Drive south (Ocean City–Longport Boulevard) – Ocean City	
Egg Harbor Township	3.16	5.09	CR 629 north (Ventnor Avenue)	Eastern terminus; continuation beyond terminus
1.000 mi = 1.609 km; 1.000 km = 0.621 mi: Route transition
