= New Jersey Route 151 =

Highway in New Jersey

Route 151
- An approximation of the initial NJ 151 from surviving roads. The portion on Market and Federal Streets was reverted shortly after designation

Route information
- Maintained by the New Jersey State Highway Department
- Length: 0.58 mi (930 m)
- Existed: 1946–by 1969

Major junctions
- West end: Martin Luther King Boulevard (after 1953); US 30 / Route 25 (before 1953) in Camden
- East end: CR 537 in Camden

Location
- Country: United States
- State: New Jersey
- Counties: Camden

Highway system
- New Jersey State Highway Routes; Interstate; US; State; Scenic Byways
| ← Route 147 | → Route 152 |

Route 151 was a short, one-way pair state highway in the city of Camden, New Jersey from Dr. Martin Luther King Jr. Boulevard to County Route 537 (Federal Street) in the city. There was also an interchange with U.S. Route 30, and the entire roadway was near Interstate 676's Interchange 5A. Route 151 ran along South Tenth Street for eastbound traffic and South Eleventh Street for westbound traffic west of Mount Ephraim Avenue. From there, South Tenth was known as Flanders Avenue and South Eleventh was known as Memorial Avenue. At U.S. Route 30, the route continued bi-directionally as Flanders Avenue until its end at County Route 537.

Route 151 originated in 1946 law, when the state took over maintenance of the local streets. The route ran from State Highway Route 25 in Camden to a ferry at Market and Federal Streets for Philadelphia, Pennsylvania. By 1969, the route was decommissioned in its entirety with maintenance being turned over to the city of Camden. In 2008, the New Jersey Department of Transportation started reworking Route 151's former alignments as part of the Camden Central Gateway project, which was completed in February 2010.

== Route description ==
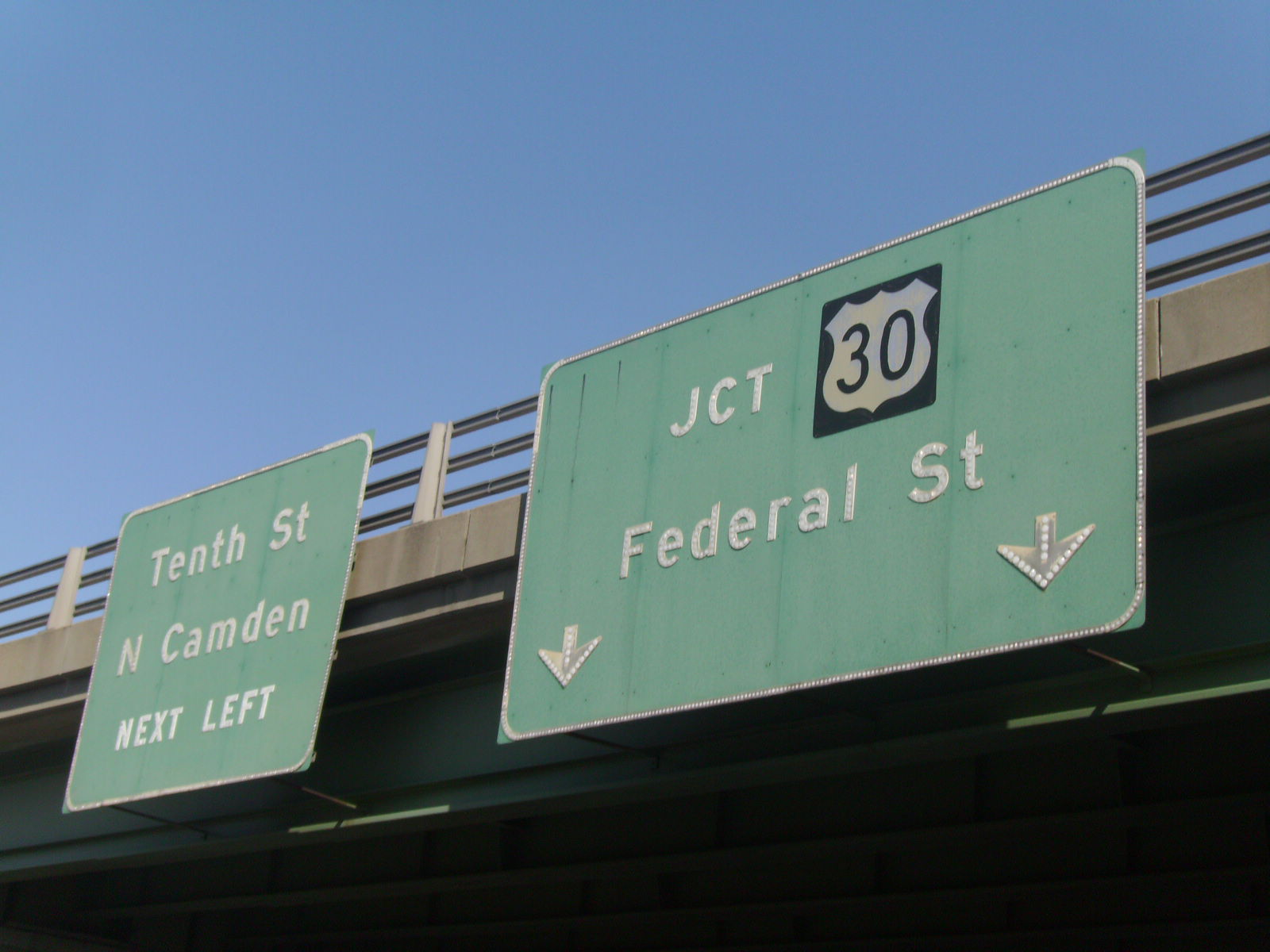
Signage along County Route 537 heading towards the Central Gateway. Although signed as Tenth Street, this is a discontinuous portion from the original route itself

The former alignment of Route 151 began at the intersection of current day Dr. Martin Luther King Jr. Boulevard and South Tenth Street in the city of Camden. Route 151 split at this intersection as a one-way directional pair roadway, with the eastbound traffic heading along South Tenth Street and the westbound traffic heading along South Eleventh Street. The eastbound direction, South Tenth Street, headed to the south, paralleling Interstate 676 to the east. A short distance later, the eastbound lanes intersected with Camden County Route 605 (Mount Ephraim Avenue), creating a short discontinuous concurrency with Route 151. At the intersection with Saint Mihiel Avenue, the eastbound lanes curved to the northeast, where they meet a partial interchange directing traffic back to Mount Ephraim Avenue. There, Route 151's eastbound lanes changed monikers to Flanders Avenue while the westbound lanes changed monikers to Memorial Avenue.

Route 151's eastbound lanes continued eastward through the Camden Gateway, crossing over U.S. Route 30 (Admiral Wilson Boulevard), then interchanging with the westbound lanes of the boulevard. There, the westbound lanes (Memorial Avenue) ended, and Route 151 continued as one set of bi-directional roadways, along Flanders Avenue heading northbound from Admiral Wilson Boulevard to the route's terminus at County Route 537 (Federal Street) in Camden.

== History ==
The alignment of Route 151 originates to 1946, when the state took over jurisdiction of South Tenth Street, South Eleventh Street and Flanders Avenue from an entrance road on State Highway Route 25 near the Cooper River. It ran through the Camden business center to a ferry for Philadelphia, Pennsylvania on Market Street and Federal Street. The route survived the state highway renumbering on January 1, 1953. The route remained in commission until the 1960s, when it was turned back over to the city of Camden for maintenance.

The alignment of former Route 151 is currently part of the New Jersey Department of Transportation's Camden Central Gateway project. The $10.8 million (2008 USD) project will involve several roadway improvements along South Tenth Street and South Eleventh Street. Along South Tenth Street, the department plans to turn the portion of South Tenth Street from Dr. Martin Luther King Boulevard to Mount Ephraim Avenue to a bi-directional roadway. Along South Eleventh Street, the department plans to convert the entirety of the roadway to bi-directional. South Eleventh Street will also receive a ramp from Interstate 676 on interchange 5A. With the change in direction, the directional loops connecting both roadways are planned to be removed. The entire project ran from December 2008 to February 2010.

== Major intersections ==
The entire route was in Camden, Camden County.

| mi | km | Destinations | Notes |
|---|---|---|---|
| 0.00 | 0.00 | CR 537 | Southern terminus |
| 0.58 | 0.93 | I-676 | Northern terminus |
1.000 mi = 1.609 km; 1.000 km = 0.621 mi

== See also ==
- New Jersey Route 51
