= New Jersey Route 109 =

State highway in Cape May County, New Jersey, US

Route 109

Route information
- Auxiliary route of US 9
- Maintained by NJDOT and Cape May County
- Length: 3.06 mi (4.92 km)
- Existed: 1972–present

Major junctions
- South end: CR 633 in Cape May
- CR 621 / Ocean Drive in Lower Township; G.S. Parkway in Lower Township
- North end: US 9 in Lower Township

Location
- Country: United States
- State: New Jersey
- Counties: Cape May

Highway system
- New Jersey State Highway Routes; Interstate; US; State; Scenic Byways
← Route 101	→ Route 120
← CR 632	→ CR 634

Route 109 is a 3.06-mile (4.92 km) state highway located in Cape May County, New Jersey, United States. The route runs from Jackson Street in Cape May north to an intersection with U.S. Route 9 (US 9) in Lower Township. It crosses one of two road bridges over the Cape May Canal (the other is Route 162) and provides access to the southern end of the Garden State Parkway and County Route 621 (CR 621, Ocean Drive) as well as to Cape May. Only the section of road in Lower Township is state maintained; the rest is maintained by Cape May County and signed as County Route 633 (CR 633), which extends 0.34 mi (0.55 km) past the southern terminus along Jackson Street and Perry Street to CR 626 in West Cape May.

Present-day Route 109 was designated as a part of pre-1927 Route 14 in 1917 before becoming the southernmost portion of Route 4 in 1927. By the 1940s, US 9 extended south to Cape May from Absecon along this part of Route 4. In 1953, the Route 4 designation was dropped from this segment of road to avoid the concurrency with US 9. In 1972, US 9 was rerouted to head to the Cape May–Lewes Ferry terminal, with the former alignment into Cape May becoming Route 109.

== Route description ==
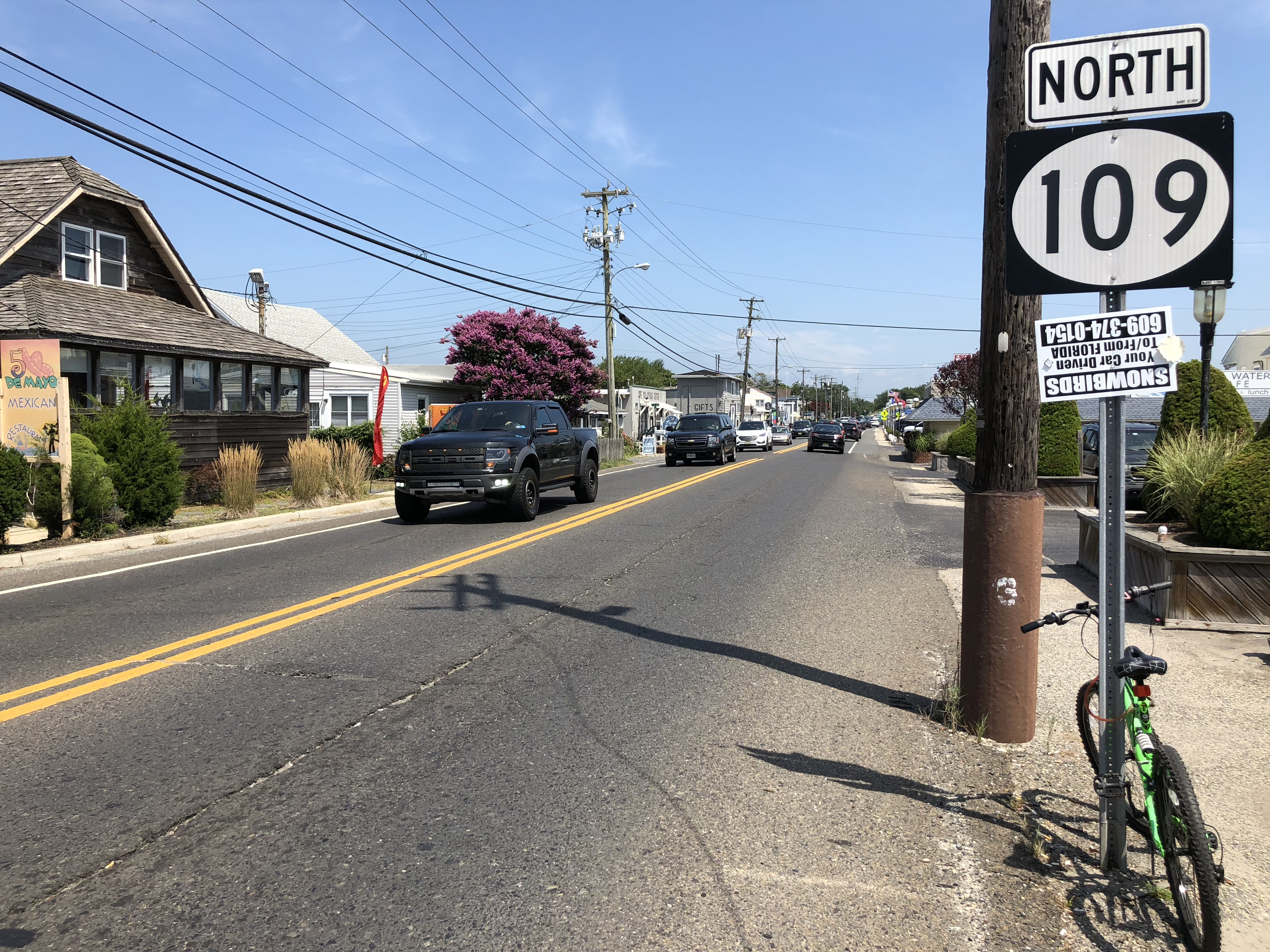
Route 109 northbound entering Lower Township

Route 109 begins at an intersection with CR 633 in the city of Cape May, heading to the northeast on Lafayette Street, a two-lane undivided road that is county-maintained and signed as a part of CR 633, which itself extends past the southern terminus of Route 109 along Jackson Street and Perry Street to CR 626 in West Cape May. The route passes through residential and commercial areas of Cape May, passing southeast of the terminus of the Cape May Seashore Lines railroad at the Cape May Welcome Center/Cape May Bus Terminal located at the former Cape May City Rail Terminal and intersecting the northern terminus of CR 653. At the intersection with Sidney Avenue, Route 109 splits into a one-way pair that has two lanes in each direction, with the northbound direction following Sidney Avenue east before turning north on Washington Street and the southbound direction remaining on Lafayette Street. Along this pairing, northbound Route 109 intersects the northern terminus of CR 622. A short distance later, Washington Street turns west to join Lafayette Street, ending the one-way pair, and the route heads north as a two-lane undivided road.

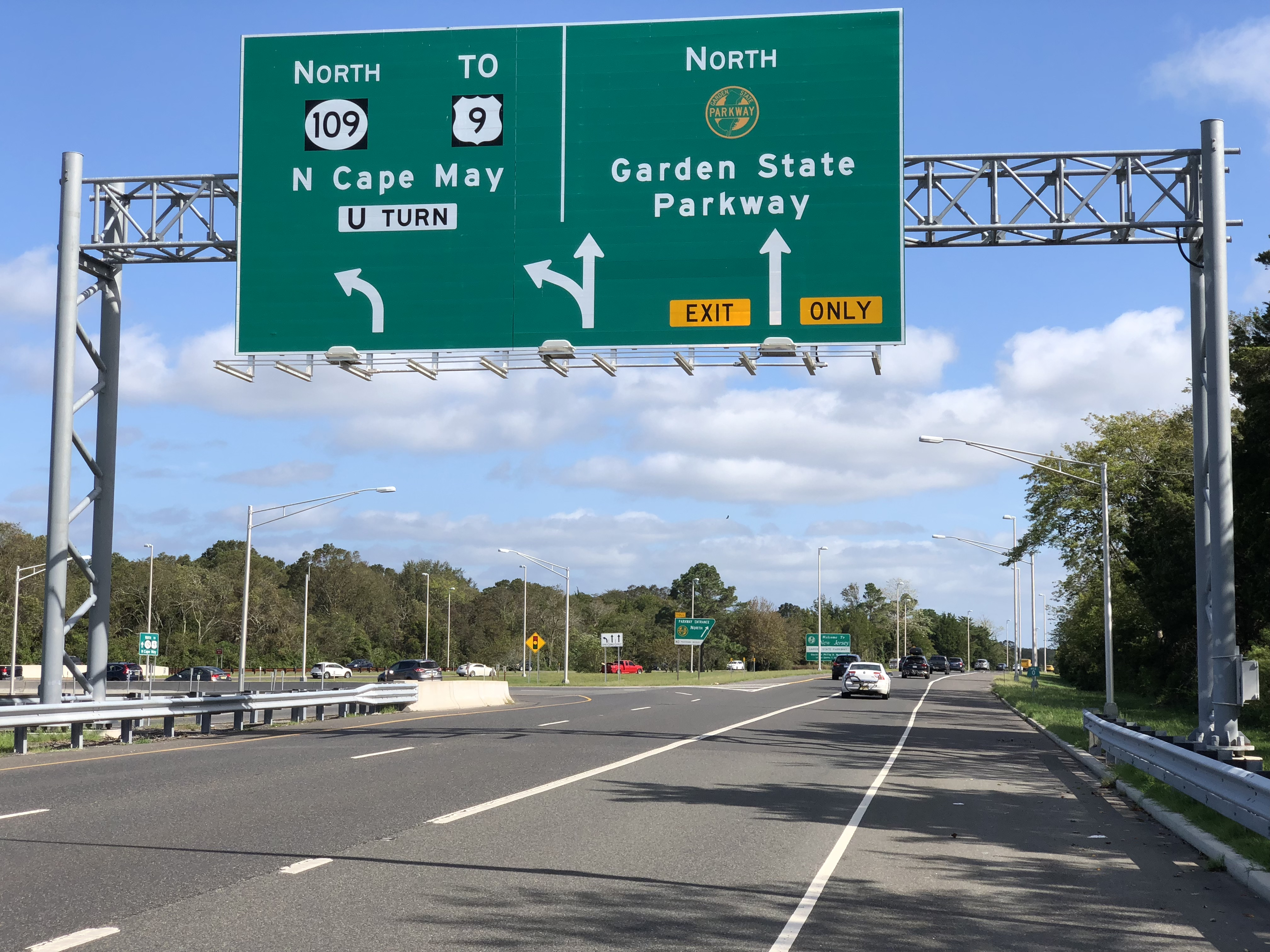
Route 109 northbound at the Garden State Parkway in Lower Township

It crosses Cape Island Creek onto an island in Lower Township. Here, the route becomes maintained by the New Jersey Department of Transportation and signed as Route 109, continuing north past several marinas and other resort businesses. The road briefly widens into a four-lane divided highway and intersects U-turn ramps in both directions before the median ends and it crosses over the Cape May Canal on the Cape May County Veterans Memorial Bridge. Upon crossing the canal, Route 109 becomes a divided highway again and intersects the southern terminus of CR 621 (Ocean Drive). From here, the road passes a mix of homes and businesses before intersecting the southern terminus of the Garden State Parkway at an at-grade intersection. At this point, the route turns to the west and becomes a two-lane undivided road and heads through woods and marshland with some residences. Route 109 heads into residential neighborhoods before it ends at an intersection with US 9, which continues north on the road past this intersection as well as west (south) along Sandman Boulevard toward the Cape May–Lewes Ferry terminal. At this intersection, a jughandle provides access from northbound Route 109 to southbound US 9.

== History ==
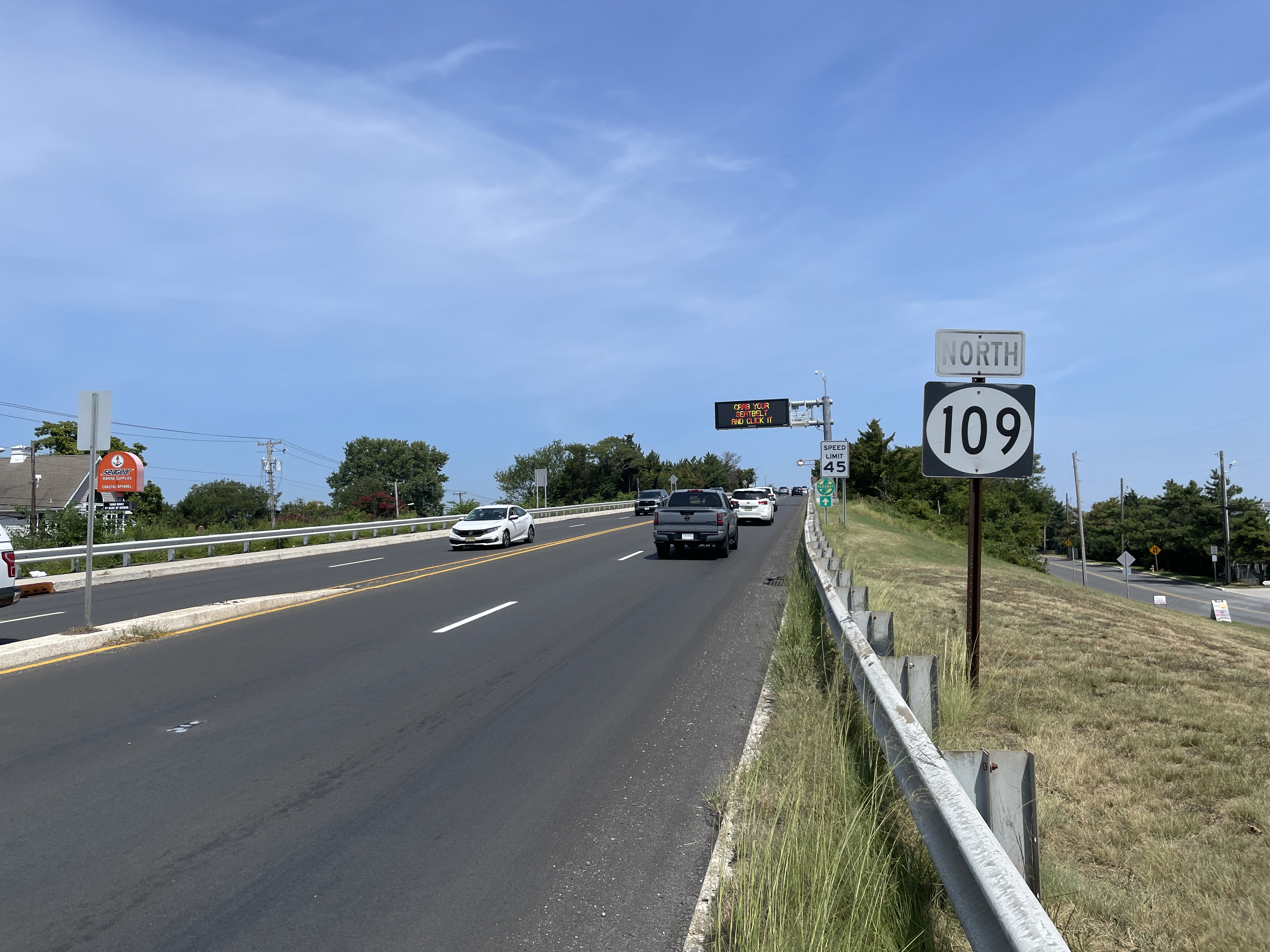
Route 109 northbound approaching the Cape May Canal in Lower Township

The road that is now Route 109 was built as part of the Cape May Turnpike, running from Cape May north to Cape May Courthouse. The road was legislated as a part of pre-1927 Route 14 in 1917, a route that was to run from Cape May to Egg Harbor City along what is now Route 109, US 9 and Route 50. In the 1927 New Jersey state highway renumbering, this portion of pre-1927 Route 14 became the southernmost part of Route 4, a route that was to run from Cape May north to the George Washington Bridge. By the 1940s, US 9 was extended south from Absecon to Cape May, running concurrent with Route 4. In the 1953 New Jersey state highway renumbering, which eliminated long concurrencies between U.S. and state routes, the Route 4 designation was dropped along this portion of road, leaving US 9 as the sole designation. The current high-level bridge over the Cape May Canal was built in 1960, replacing a wooden swing bridge built by the U.S. Government when the Cape May Canal was constructed during World War II. In 1972, US 9 was relocated from its southern terminus in Cape May to head west to the Cape May–Lewes Ferry terminal in North Cape May, with the former route into Cape May becoming Route 109. On November 7, 2009, the bridge carrying Route 109 over the Cape May Canal was named the Cape May County Veterans Memorial Bridge, honoring all veterans.

== Major intersections ==
The entire route is in Cape May County.

Location	mi	km	Destinations	Notes
Cape May	0.00	0.00	CR 633 south (Jackson Street)	Southern terminus
Lower Township	2.04	3.28	CR 621 north / Ocean Drive north – Wildwood Crest	Southern terminus of CR 621
Lower Township	2.31	3.72	G.S. Parkway north	Southern terminus and exit 0 on G.S. Parkway
Lower Township	3.06	4.92	US 9 (Sandman Boulevard) – Cape May Ferry	Northern terminus
1.000 mi = 1.609 km; 1.000 km = 0.621 mi
