= Cape May Canal =

Waterway in New Jersey, US

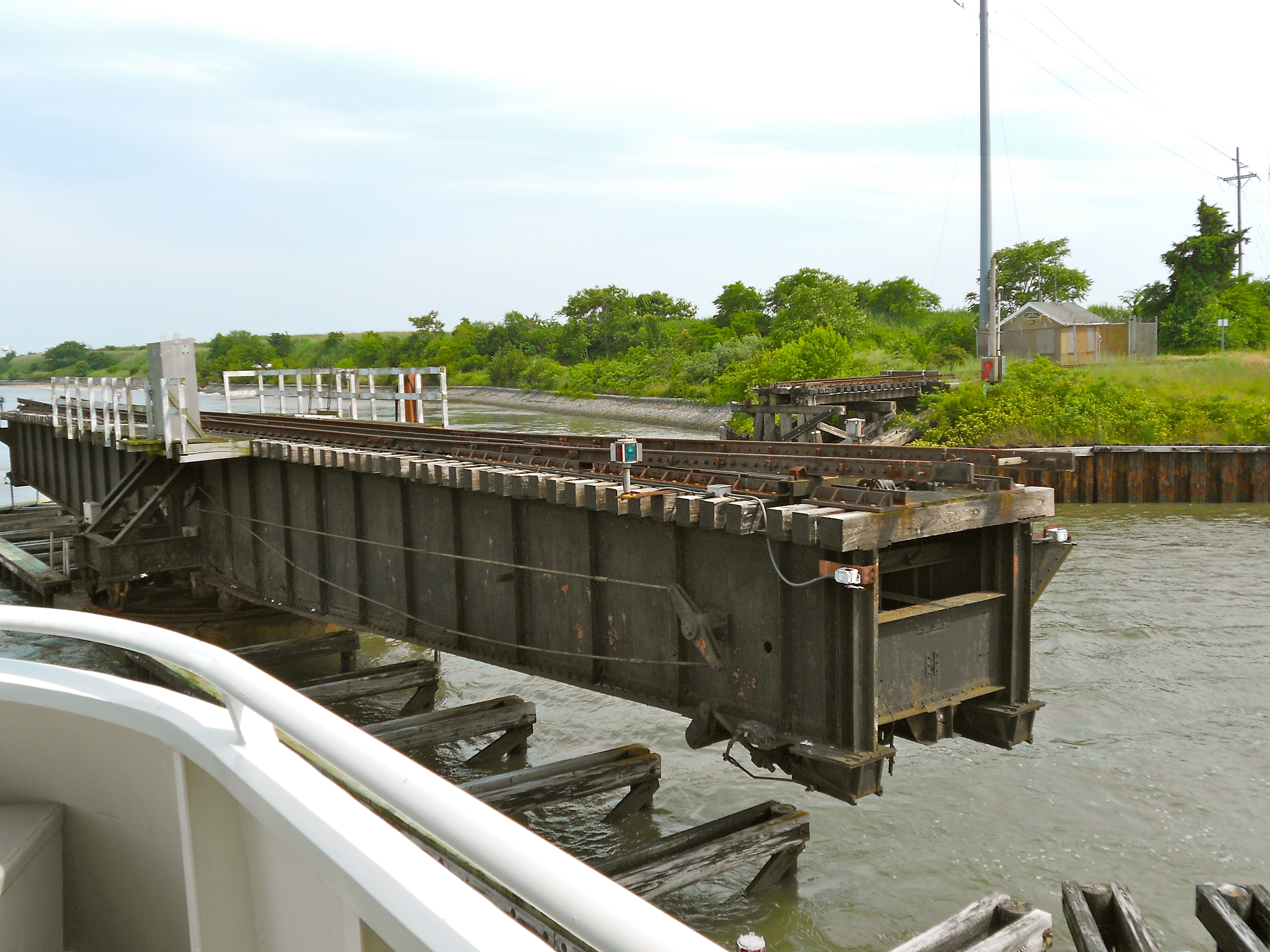
- Railroad swing bridge, one of three bridges across the canal

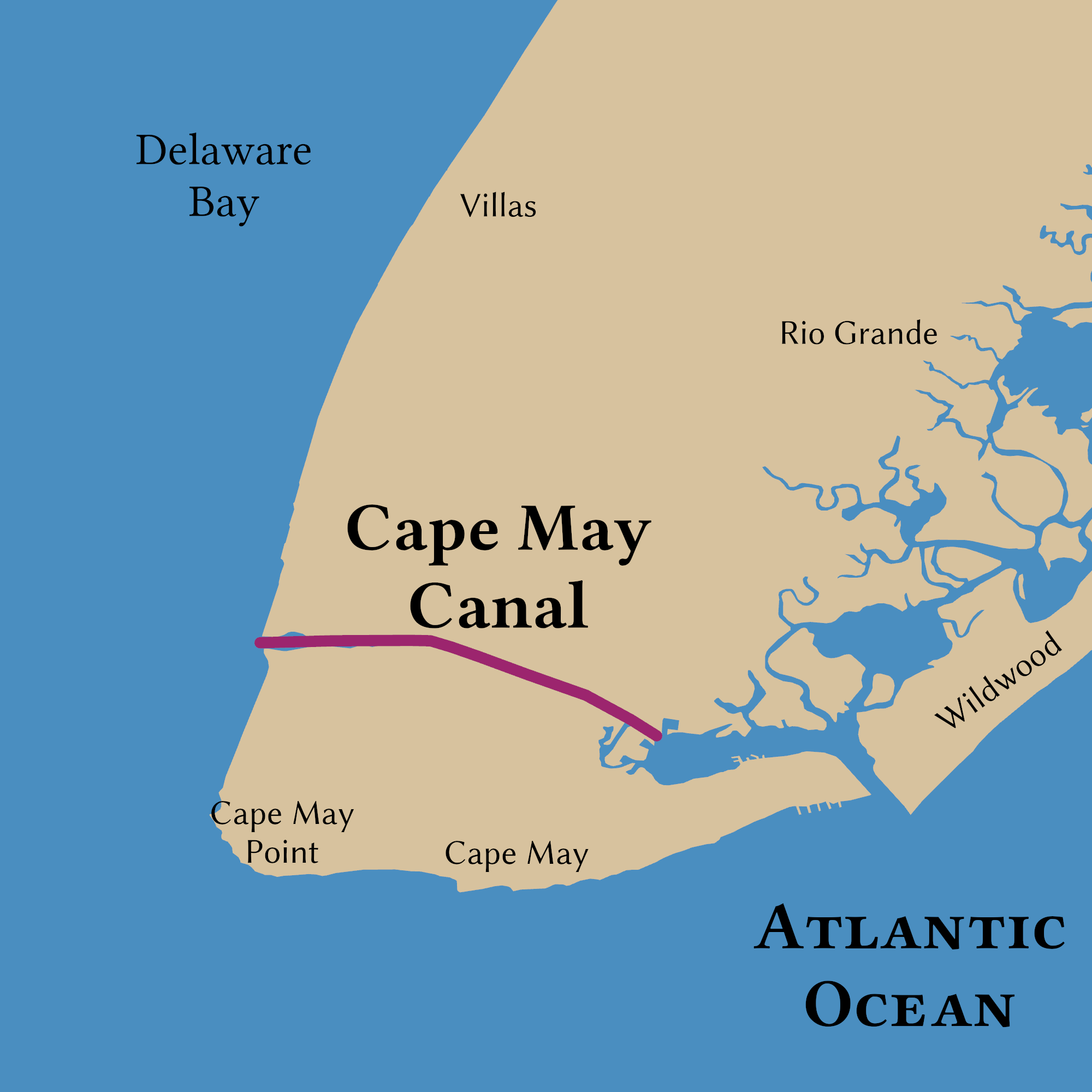
- The path of the canal
- Interactive map of Cape May Canal

Specifications
- Length: 3.3 miles (5.3 km)

History
- Original owner: United States Army Corps of Engineers
- Date of first use: 1942

Geography
- Start point: Cape May Harbor
- End point: Delaware Bay
- Beginning coordinates: 38.9527°N 74.9034°W
- Ending coordinates: 38.9667°N 74.9648°W

The Cape May Canal is a 2.9-nautical-mile (3.3 mi; 5.4 km) waterway connecting Cape May Harbor to the Delaware Bay, at the southern tip of Cape May County, New Jersey. There is a long history of unfulfilled plans for a canal across Cape May. The canal was finally constructed by the United States Army Corps of Engineers during World War II to provide a protected route to avoid German U-boats operating off Cape May Point and to become part of the New Jersey Intracoastal Waterway. The canal was dredged as a wartime emergency measure in 1942 and was the final link in a protected waterway intended to allow coastal shipping to travel along the coast with a greatly reduced risk of attack from German submarines. The Cape May terminus of the Cape May–Lewes Ferry is located near the west end of the canal.

== History ==
Albert Gallatin, the Secretary of the Treasury, recommended in an 1808 report that "a series of canals be constructed along the seacoast, cutting across the necks of many peninsulas so as to provide an inland passage for seagoing vessels from Massachusetts southward through North Carolina." Nathaniel Holmes proposed government aid for a canal across Cape May in the 1840s and the Risley brothers detailed a plan and started dredging a canal from Stone Harbor to Bidwell's Creek.

More serious plans developed after 1905 when Cape May Sound was dredged to form part of the Intracoastal Waterway. Later Cape May Harbor was formed by dredging, and Cold Spring Inlet was dredged to form an entrance to the harbor for larger seagoing vessels. The importance of these extensions to the Intracoastal Waterway was underlined when the Navy built a base in 1917 on the south shore of Cape May Harbor. The base later became a Coast Guard facility, today called the United States Coast Guard Training Center Cape May.

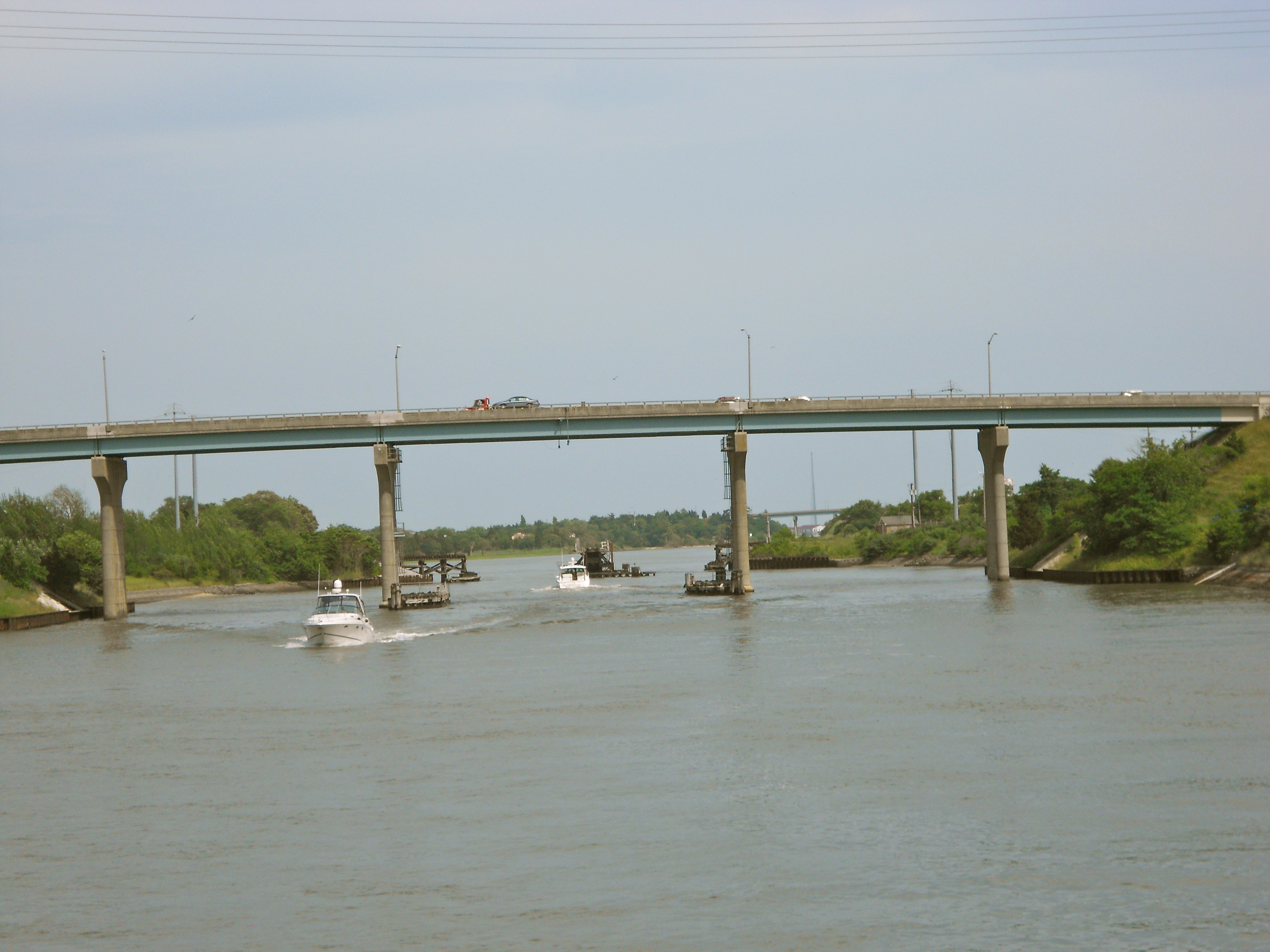
Seashore Road (Rt. 162) bridge across the canal

The first congressional bill to build the canal was introduced in 1935, but never reported out of committee. A 1940 bill passed both houses of Congress, but was vetoed by President Franklin Roosevelt. A November 1941 bill authorizing construction was signed into law, but did not provide funding. Federal and state funding became available in 1942 after several ships were sunk by German U-boats in early 1942.

The canal created Cape Island, which includes Cape May, Cape May Point, West Cape May and the southernmost portions of Lower Township. The island is separated from the mainland and the rest of Cape May County by the canal, Cape Island Creek, and Cape May Harbor.

There are three bridges across the canal: Route 109 (the link from the Garden State Parkway into Cape May), Route 162 (Seashore Road into West Cape May), and the railroad swing bridge of the Cape May Seashore Lines. The canal is used heavily by recreational boat traffic during the summer.
