= Tropical Storm Fay (2020) =

Atlantic tropical storm

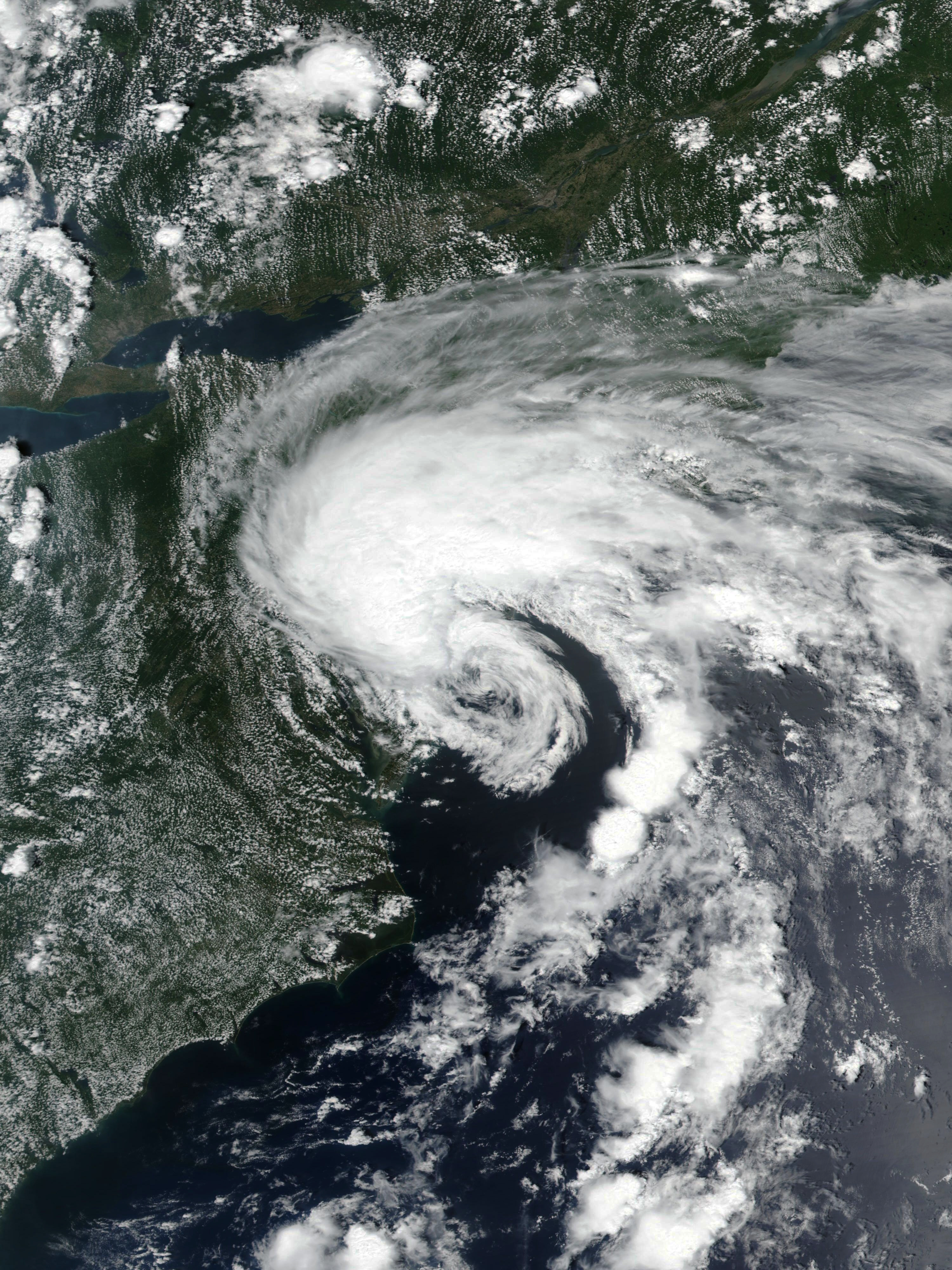
- Tropical Storm Fay at peak intensity shortly before landfall in New Jersey on July 10

Meteorological history
- Formed: July 9, 2020
- Remnant low: July 11, 2020
- Dissipated: July 12, 2020

Tropical storm
- 1-minute sustained (SSHWS/NWS)
- Highest winds: 60 mph (95 km/h)
- Lowest pressure: 998 mbar (hPa); 29.47 inHg

Overall effects
- Fatalities: 6 total
- Damage: $220 million (2020 USD)
- Areas affected: Eastern Southeastern United States, East Coast of the United States, Atlantic Canada
- Part of the 2020 Atlantic hurricane season

Tropical Storm Fay was the first tropical cyclone to make landfall in the U.S state of New Jersey since Hurricane Irene in 2011. The sixth named storm of the very active 2020 Atlantic hurricane season, Fay was the earliest sixth named storm on record in the basin when it formed on July 9. Fay originated from a surface low that formed over the Northern Gulf of Mexico on July 3 and slowly drifted eastward, before crossing over the Florida Panhandle. The system subsequently drifted across the Southeastern United States as a well-defined low pressure system, before emerging off the coast of North Carolina on July 8. From there, the storm utilized favorable conditions for development, or tropical cyclogenesis, and coalesced into a tropical storm on July 9. The storm intensified, reaching its peak intensity on July 10, with maximum 1-minute sustained winds of 60 mph (97 km/h) and a minimum central pressure of 998 millibars (29.5 inHg). While moving northward, Fay made landfall on New Jersey later that day. After making landfall, the storm quickly lost most of its organization and rapidly transitioned into a post-tropical cyclone over New York on July 11, before being absorbed by a larger extratropical low over Quebec on July 12.

Fay's precursor disturbance was responsible for extensive rainfall and flash flooding in the Southeastern United States, especially within Georgia and South Carolina. After its landfall, Tropical Storm Fay brought high winds and stormy weather to much of the Mid-Atlantic states and the Northeastern United States, with the heaviest rains occurring west of Long Island. Six people were killed by rip currents and flooding related to the storm. Many interstates and other principal highways throughout the Philadelphia and New York City metropolitan areas were flooded and were left impassable, leading to widespread road closures and disruption to commuters. Uprooted trees and damaged power lines from windy conditions caused thousands of power outages in Pennsylvania and New Jersey. Total economic losses from Fay in the United States exceeded US$220 million.

== Meteorological history ==
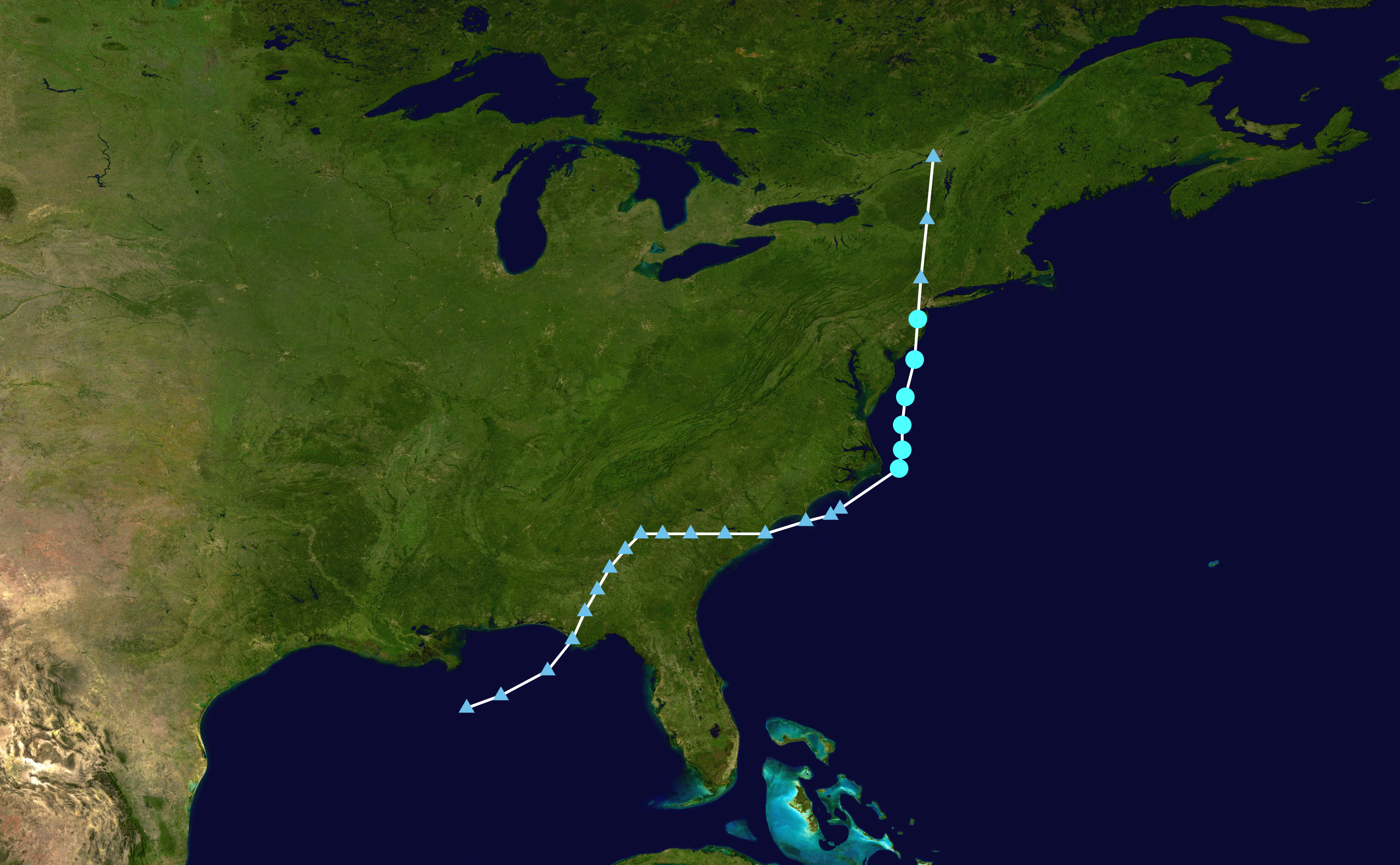
Map plotting the storm's track and intensity, according to the Saffir–Simpson scale Map key Saffir–Simpson scale Tropical depression (≤38 mph, ≤62 km/h) Tropical storm (39–73 mph, 63–118 km/h) Category 1 (74–95 mph, 119–153 km/h) Category 2 (96–110 mph, 154–177 km/h) Category 3 (111–129 mph, 178–208 km/h) Category 4 (130–156 mph, 209–251 km/h) Category 5 (≥157 mph, ≥252 km/h) Unknown Storm type Tropical cyclone Subtropical cyclone Extratropical cyclone, remnant low, tropical disturbance, or monsoon depression

Fay can first be traced back to a decaying trough of frontal origin, which was drifting across the southeastern United States on July 1–2. A portion of the trough formed into a low pressure system off the coast of Georgia, which would later become Tropical Storm Edouard, and the remaining section of the trough persisted over the northern Gulf of Mexico and proceeded to spawn an elongated region of low atmospheric pressure. By July 4, the National Hurricane Center (NHC) first mentioned the possibility of eventual tropical cyclogenesis from this trough in the northern Gulf of Mexico, which at that time consisted of disorganized convection, or thunderstorms. A smaller-scale low pressure center formed within the disturbance, but before the feature could further consolidate, it moved inland near Panama City, Florida around 06:00 UTC on July 6. Surface and Doppler weather radar observations confirmed the feature had a small 90 nmi radius of 1-minute sustained winds up to 35 mph (56 km/h), characteristic of a tropical cyclone, but was accompanied by a large, disorganized area of thunderstorms and thus, didn't meet the NHC's criteria to be deemed a tropical cyclone. While inland, the NHC assessed a 50% probability that the weather system would become a tropical or subtropical cyclone, which the agency soon raised to a 70% probability. The low moved through Georgia and proceeded to turned eastward under the influence of the southern edge of the mid-latitude westerly winds, crossing over southern South Carolina, before emerging into the Western Atlantic on July 8. On July 9, the thunderstorm activity of the low increased as it moved northeastward, parallel to the coast of North Carolina even as the system experienced a sudden slowing in its forward motion.

Late on July 9, United States Air Force hurricane hunters flew into the system and detected a low-level circulation center near the edge of its thunderstorms, which indicated a reformation of the original low-level circulation center, with the development of strong convection just east of Cape Hatteras. Based on the organization of the system, and observations of 45 mph (72 km/h) sustained winds, the NHC initiated advisories on Tropical Storm Fay at 21:00 UTC on July 9. The storm was located over the warm waters of the Gulf Stream and in an area of light to moderate wind shear; these environmental factors favored intensification of the tropical cyclone. The elongated circulation of the developing storm was steered generally northward by a ridge over the western Atlantic Ocean and by an approaching trough from the south. On July 10, Fay strengthened throughout the day, reaching its peak intensity, with 1-minute sustained winds of 60 mph (97 km/h) and a minimum central pressure of 998 millibars (29.5 inHg), despite some southwesterly wind shear. This wind shear caused the storm to entrain dry air, which gave it a non-classical tropical cyclone structure. At that time, Fay had a small circulation center exposed just east of the Delmarva peninsula, which was rotating around a larger circulation. Around 20:00 UTC on July 10, Fay made landfall just north-northeast of Atlantic City, New Jersey with maximum sustained winds of 50 mph (80 km/h). By that time, the system was already losing some of its tropical characteristics, with rapidly decreasing amounts of thunderstorms near the center and the deepest convection displaced well to the east and southeast of the center. Fay continued weakening as it moved northward through New Jersey, and weakened into a tropical depression as it crossed into southeastern New York. Early on July 11, the system transitioned into a post-tropical cyclone as the center became devoid of deep convection. Afterward, Fay's remnants were drawn into the circulation of an approaching extratropical storm, before being fully absorbed into the approaching system over Quebec on July 12.

== Preparations ==
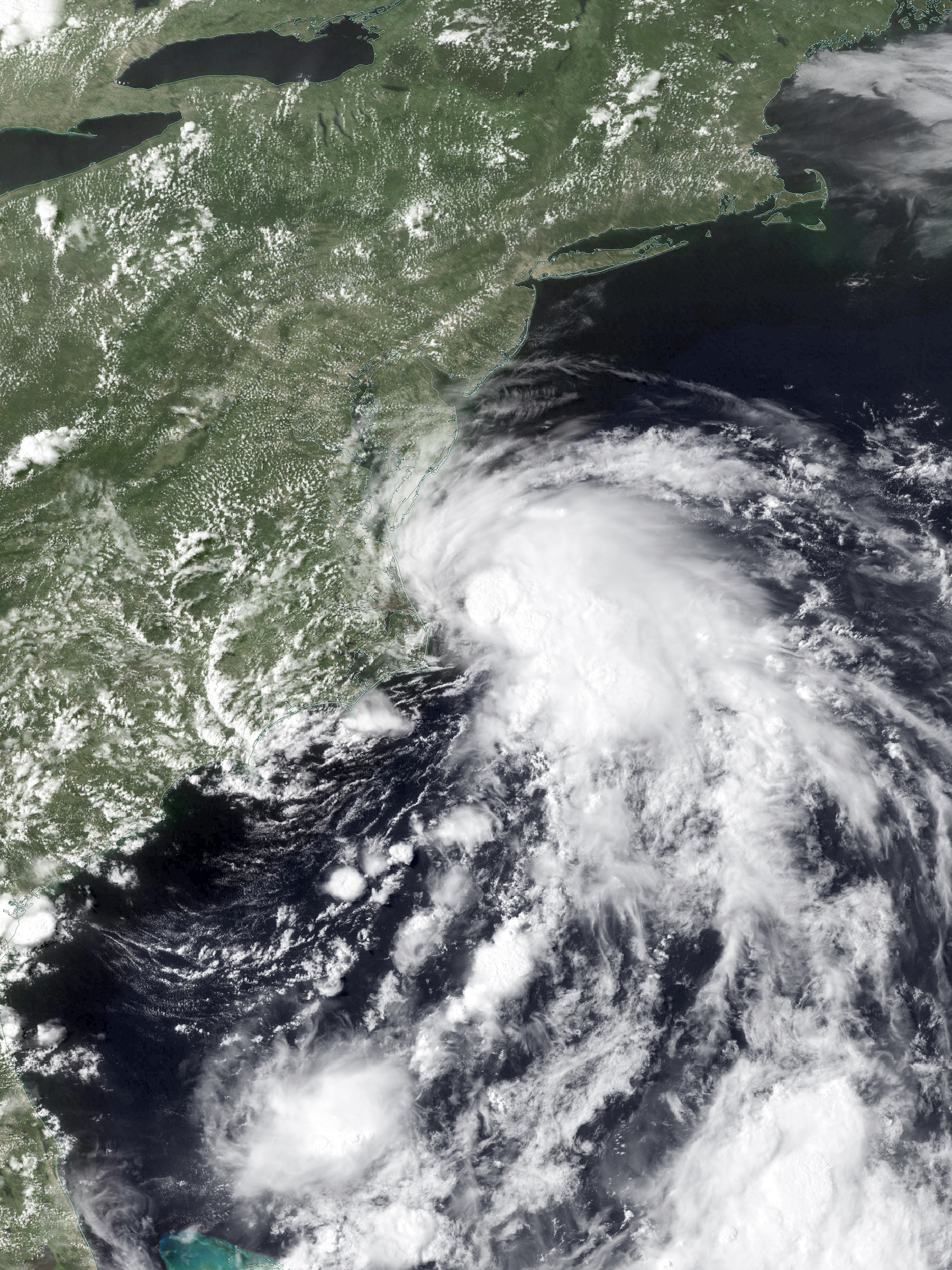
Fay shortly after being named on July 9

Upon issuing its first advisory on Fay, the National Hurricane Center (NHC) issued a tropical storm warning from Cape May, New Jersey to Watch Hill, Rhode Island, including Long Island and Block Island. On July 10, the NHC extended the warning southward to Fenwick Island, Delaware, including the Delaware Bay. The National Weather Service issued a flash flood watch for much of the Eastern Shore of Maryland, all of New Jersey, and New York City. The entirety of Long Island was also placed under a flash flood warning.

United States President Donald Trump's rally in Portsmouth, New Hampshire was delayed. Due to concerns of the COVID-19 pandemic, the rally was supposed to be held outdoors. However, forecasters expected heavy rainfall and gusty winds from Fay or its remnants, which led the Trump campaign to postpone the rally, due to safety precautions.

Lifeguards restricted swimming in three Delaware beaches due to the threat for rip currents. Jersey Shore locals were advised to avoid the coast, due to the threat of high waves, while community leaders began to take precautions to diminish flooding threats, such as lowering water levels in nearby lakes. New York Governor Andrew Cuomo released a statement on July 9, urging New York State residents to stay alert and cautious, due to the impending severe weather conditions, highlighting a significant chance of flash flooding. Residents of New York City were advised by New York City Emergency Management to take emergency precautions and to prepare for power outages and locally strong wind gusts.

== Impact ==
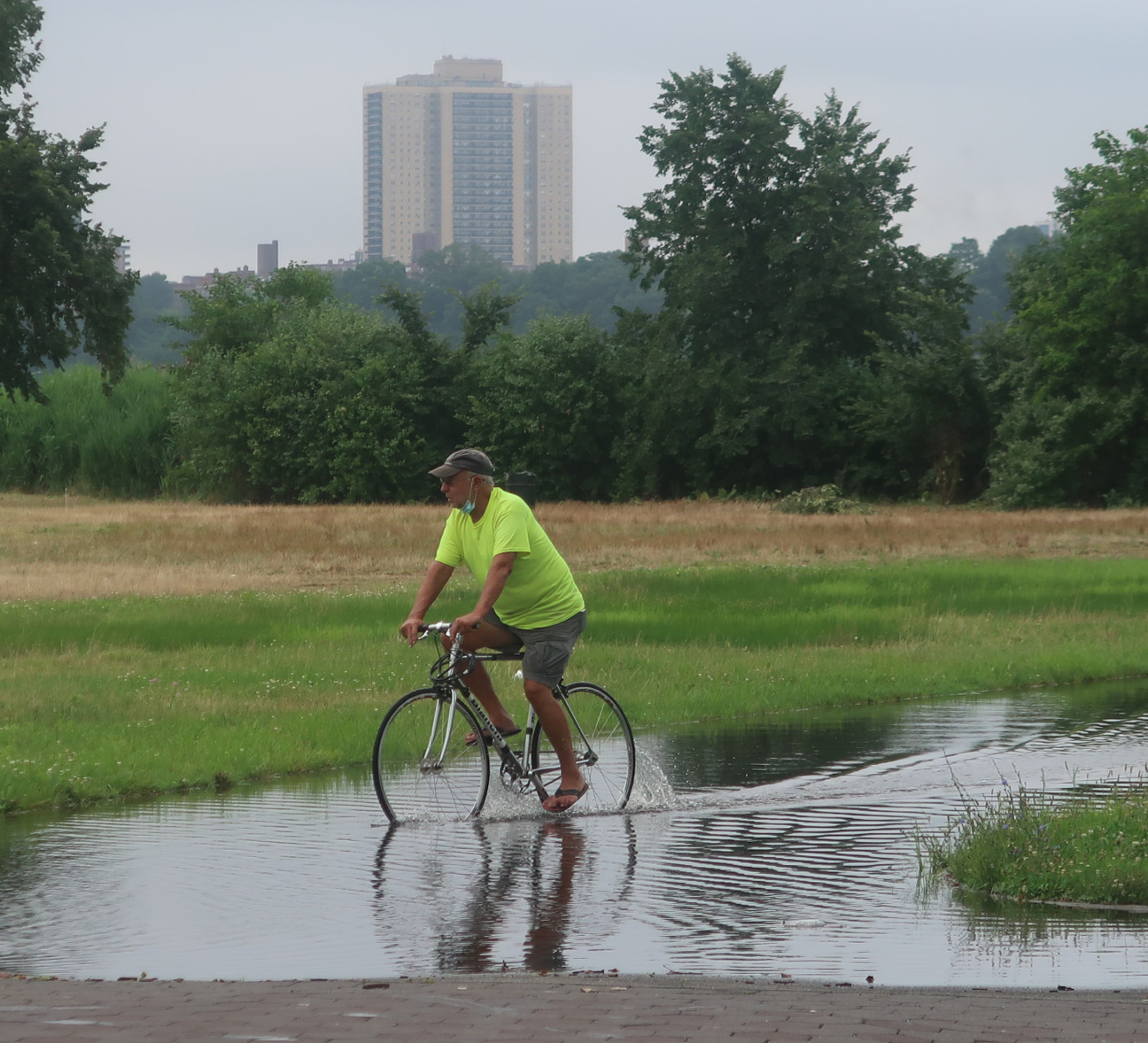
Some minor flooding in the Flushing Meadows Park after the storm

=== Southeastern United States ===
The precursor disturbance to Fay moved into the Florida Panhandle and crossed over into Georgia on July 6, delivering heavy rainfall throughout the state and causing widespread flash flooding as far as the Savannah River valley. Augusta, Georgia recorded its wettest day in July on record, with 4.64 inches (118 mm) of rain falling in 24 hours, breaking the record of 4.58 inches (116 mm) that had stood since 1887. 7.07 inches (180 mm) of rain fell in 48 hours in Loco. US$4,000 worth of property damage occurred in Ringgold, when a severe thunderstorm generated by the disturbance caused 60 mph (97 km/h) winds in the city, causing trees to become uprooted or topple over onto homes. Many roads in South Carolina were deemed inaccessible and became flooded, while one road became completely washed out. Hunting Island State Park in South Carolina recorded at least 12.75 inches (324 mm) of rain due to the disturbance and had to be closed; over 100 sea turtle nests were also destroyed within the park boundaries. Beachgoers on the North Carolina coast observed two waterspouts on July 6, with one of them moving ashore and becoming an EF0 tornado, which lifted an umbrella, although it is not clear as to whether or not this was actually caused by Fay or another approaching extratropical storm from the west.

=== Northeastern United States ===
Fay's impacts were felt across a majority of the Northeastern U.S., with widespread rain, flash flooding, and minor wind damage occurring as a result of the storm. Losses from Fay in this region were estimated to be at least US$350 million.

==== Delaware and Pennsylvania ====
While Fay was near peak intensity, its rainbands produced gale-force winds along the Delaware coast, with sustained winds of 47 mph (76 km/h) and gusts as high as 57 mph (92 km/h) recorded near Long Neck. Several other Mesonet and DelDOT sites measured tropical storm-force wind gusts along the coastline as well. The storm uprooted trees and knocked down power lines in Long Neck and Nassau. Rainfall in the state reached 6.97 in (177 mm) near Lewes. Heavy rainfall caused flooding in Sussex County, reaching depths of 1 to 2.5 ft (0.30 to 0.76 m) in Bethany Beach. Floodwaters covered portions of DE 1, including the area just south of the Indian River Inlet Bridge. The intersection of DE 1 and DE 54 in Fenwick Island was flooded, where a vehicle knocked down a pedestrian signal pole at the intersection. There was also minor beach erosion along several Delaware beaches. Tidal flooding also occurred farther north in the state along the Christina River in New Castle County. Fay also caused flash flooding in neighboring Pennsylvania, with a rainfall total of 5.26 in (134 mm) recorded in Wynnewood. At least six drivers required rescue when their vehicles were flooded. Pennypack Creek exceeded its flood stage of 7 ft (2.1 m), sending floodwaters flowing near Philadelphia. The storm also knocked down trees and power lines across eastern Pennsylvania.

==== New Jersey and New York State ====
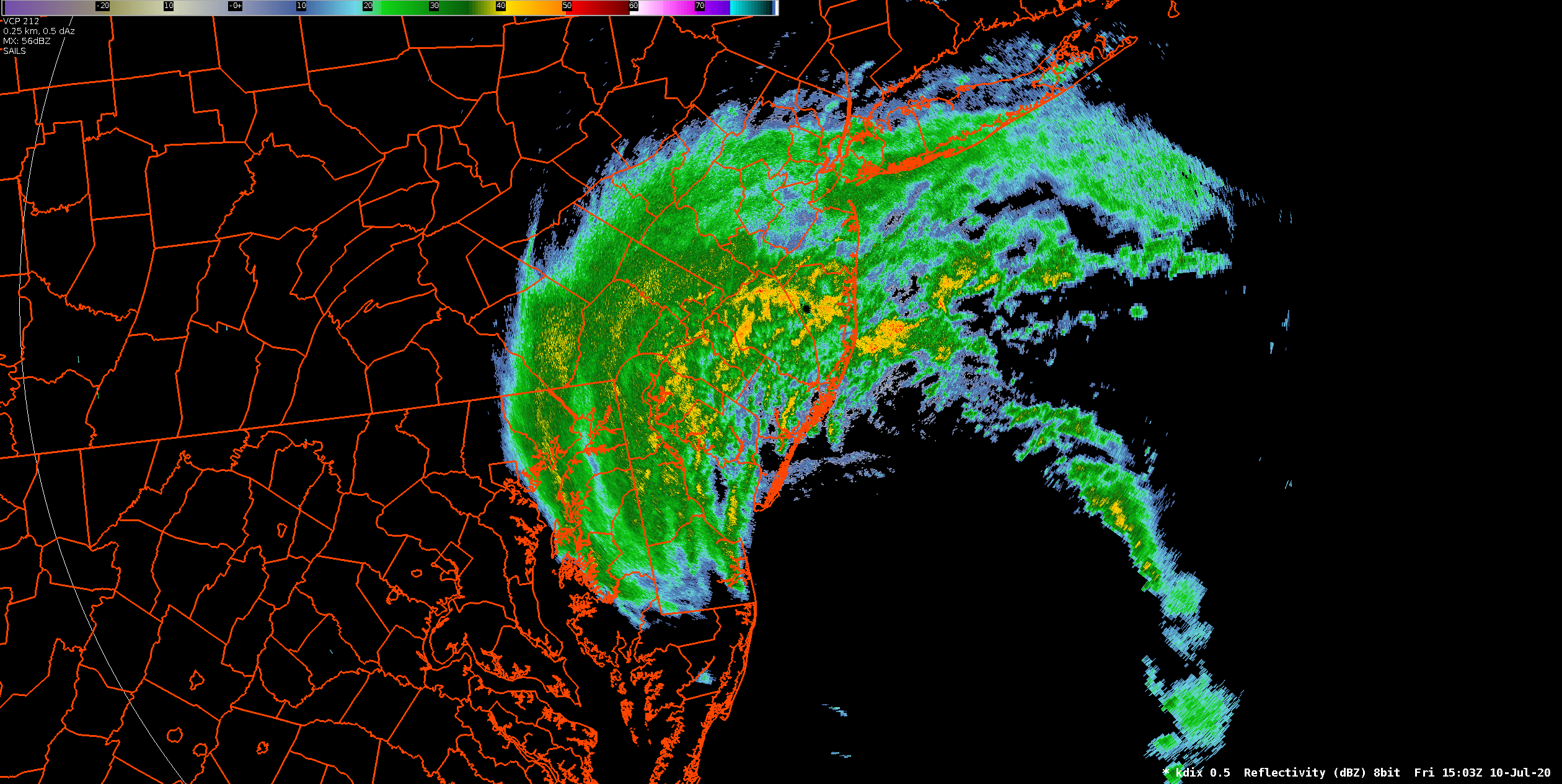
Tropical Storm Fay approximately 5 hours before its landfall in New Jersey on July 10, 2020. The storm's intense rainband was moving northwards into the most populated regions of New Jersey.

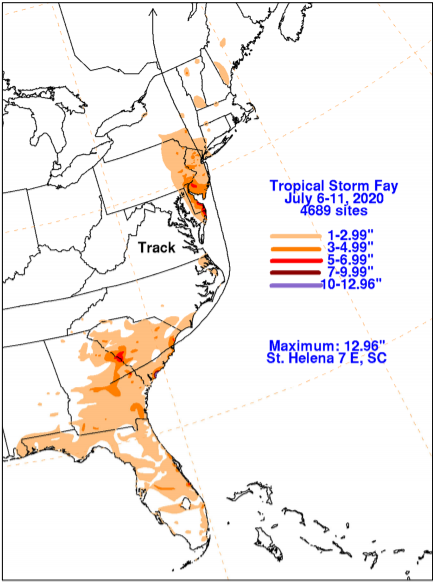
Total rainfall produced by Tropical Storm Fay from July 9–11, 2020.

In neighboring New Jersey, Fay also dropped heavy rainfall, totaling 5.86 in (149 mm) near Wildwood Crest. Various areas reported rainfall totals up to 7 inches (180 mm)– despite initial forecasts only showing rainfall totals as high as 3 inches (76 mm). The storm caused flooding in several Jersey Shore towns, including Wildwood, North Wildwood, Sea Isle City, and Ocean City, with streets covered in water and some road closures occurring. Flooded roads included portions of the New Jersey Turnpike, Interstates 287 and 295, U.S. Routes 9, 30, 202, 322; and several state and local roads. Sustained winds in New Jersey reached 44 mph (71 km/h) near Strathmere, with gusts up to 53 mph (85 km/h). The winds knocked down trees and power lines, causing some road closures. Tropical storm-force wind gusts up to 54 mph (87 km/h) brought down trees across Monmouth County. Widespread roadway flooding in Stone Harbor, Avalon, Sea Isle City, and Rio Grande in Cape May County left many roads impassable and forced New Jersey Route 47 to be closed. Additionally, New Jersey Routes 10, 35, 45, 66, and 77 were flooded and closed. Police in Ocean City alerted drivers to avoid the southern portion of the city as roads quickly became impassable due to floodwaters. 10,000 people lost power in the state across 74 different cities. Feet of floodwaters covered roads in Ocean City, Margate City, and Gloucester City, and caused several people to need rescuing. A trained spotter reported floodwaters near Gloucester City Middle School as deep as 2–4 ft (0.61–1.22 m). Social media reported that a railroad overpass in Hoboken was flooded; cars were left unable to move, with water up to the car doors. Rainfall totals at Newark Liberty International Airport were logged at 2.78 in (71 mm). As a result, 18 residents in Newark, New Jersey had to be rescued from floodwaters by the Newark Fire Department, most of whom were stranded within their vehicles.

As Fay passed west of New York City, the storm caused heavy rainfall along its path. An Automated Surface Observation System (ASOS) in Central Park recorded a total of 2.43 inches (62 mm) of rain, while several Mesonet stations in the Boroughs of New York City recorded rainfall totals as high as 2.96 inches (75 mm) in Midtown Manhattan, 2.44 inches (62 mm) in Brooklyn, 2.21 inches (56 mm) on Staten Island, 2.17 inches (55 mm) in The Bronx, and 2.06 inches (52 mm) in Queens. The storm reportedly flooded several New York City Subway stations as well.

An 18-year-old swimmer who rescued two of his friends from drowning eventually drowned in the ocean near Atlantic City. An unidentified teenager in Eastern New Jersey was pulled underwater in a strong rip current and their body was never recovered, presumably having drowned, according to a media report. A 77-year-old swimmer and a 17-year-old swimmer injured from rough surf conditions were also pulled from the ocean at Atlantic City and Raritan Bay, respectively, on July 11, and later died from their injuries. A 24-year-old man went missing while swimming and was presumed dead by authorities in Ocean City, New Jersey. On July 18, a fisherman off the Great Egg Harbor Inlet discovered the deceased body of the missing man.

In Long Beach, New York, a 19-year-old drowned off the coast, after being caught in rip currents from Fay. He was with five other swimmers, whom were rescued after also being caught in the rip currents.

==== New England ====
In Maine, the post-tropical remnants of Fay briefly spawned a waterspout over Baker Lake, which became an EF0 tornado once it moved ashore between Hiram and Naples on July 11, with minor damage to some trees and homes. Despite the post-tropical cyclone passing over the state, rainfall totals did not exceed 1 inch (25 mm) and there were no other reports of damage.

In Vermont, post-tropical Fay brought rain showers across the state but there was no reports of damage. Connecticut was affected by rain showers due to the cyclone but had escaped most of the severe impacts. A 1-minute sustained wind of 33 mph (53 km/h) and a wind gust of 40 mph (64 km/h) was recorded near Norwalk. The city of Bridgeport experienced their second wettest July day on record with 3.99 inches (101 mm) of rain. A 64-year-old Massachusetts man was also identified as a victim of drowning off a Rhode Island beach on July 12, although it is unclear whether Fay was responsible for the fatality.

== See also ==
- Tropical cyclones in 2020
- Other storms of the same name
- List of Delaware hurricanes
- List of Maryland hurricanes (1950–present)
- List of New Jersey hurricanes
- List of Pennsylvania hurricanes
- List of New York hurricanes
- List of New England hurricanes
- Tropical Storm Danielle (1992) – struck the same area at a similar intensity with similar effects.
- Hurricane Isabel (2003) – Took similar to Fay, in North Carolina and Virginia, and tropical storm in New Jersey.
- Hurricane Irene (2011) – caused significant damage to New Jersey and surrounding areas as a much larger tropical storm.
- Hurricane Sandy (2012) – caused catastrophic damage in the same regions as a hurricane-force post-tropical cyclone.
- Hurricane Isaias (2020) – affected the northeast just a few weeks later, causing severe damage.
