= Corson's Inlet State Park =

State park in Cape May County, New Jersey

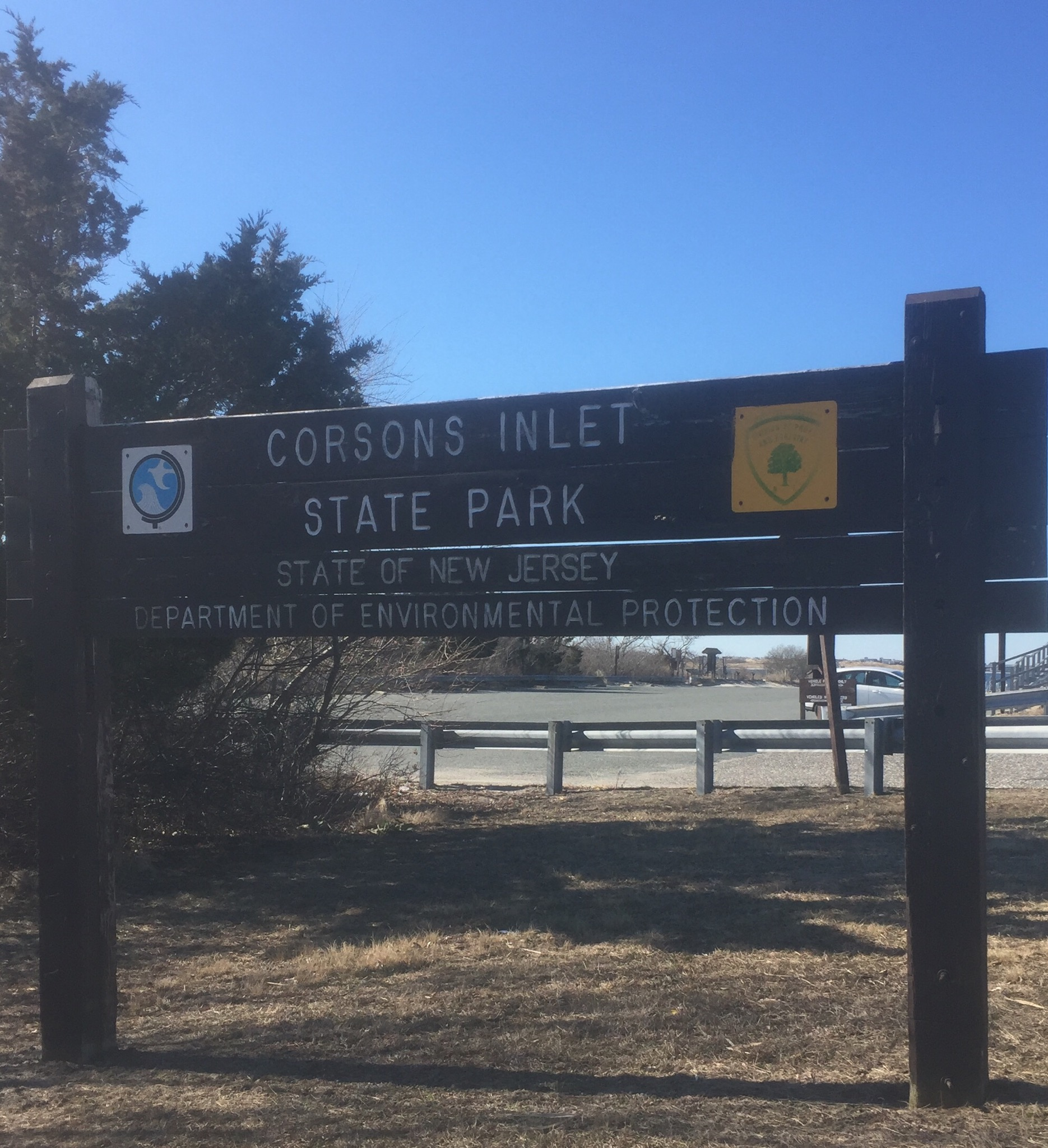
- Sign marking the entrance of the park

- Location within New Jersey Location within the United States
- Location: Cape May County, United States
- Coordinates: 39°13′1.95″N 74°38′46.52″W
- Area: 341 acres (1.38 km^{2})
- Created: 1969
- Operator: New Jersey Division of Parks and Forestry
- Website: Official website

Corson's Inlet State Park was established by the New Jersey Legislature in 1969 to protect and preserve one of the last undeveloped tracts of land along the state's oceanfront. The park borders Corson Inlet. The area's natural habitats are teeming with wildlife established in the numerous primary and secondary sand dune systems, shoreline overwash, marine estuaries, and upland areas. The park offers opportunities for observing a number of migratory and residential wildlife species. The park itself is located in Cape May County, just south of Ocean City. The park is operated and maintained by the New Jersey Division of Parks and Forestry.

== Location and description ==
The park is located in Cape May County, just south of Ocean City, adjacent to Corson's Inlet. Included in the park is Strathmere Natural Area, located north of Strathmere. The park consists of 341-acre (1.38 km^{2}) of undeveloped and undisturbed sand dunes that serves as a protected nesting site for the endangered piping plover, the least tern and black skimmers. Other shorebirds and waterfowl, such as the American oystercatcher, various species of sandpipers, gulls, herons, sanderlings and ducks also stop during the year.

There are two endangered species that inhabit the park – the piping plover, a bird; and the seabeach amaranth, a plant.

== History ==
In 1969, the New Jersey Legislature established Corson's Inlet State Park to protect and preserve one of the last undeveloped areas of land along the New Jersey coastline. Since then, the park has been managed by Belleplain State Forest. In 2012, the park received a $5,850 federal grant to construct a 300 ft (91 m) boardwalk trail that would form a loop in the park. The grant would be matched by $3,700 from the New Jersey State Park Service. Local environmentalists protested the project, citing the disruption to the environment.

== Recreation ==
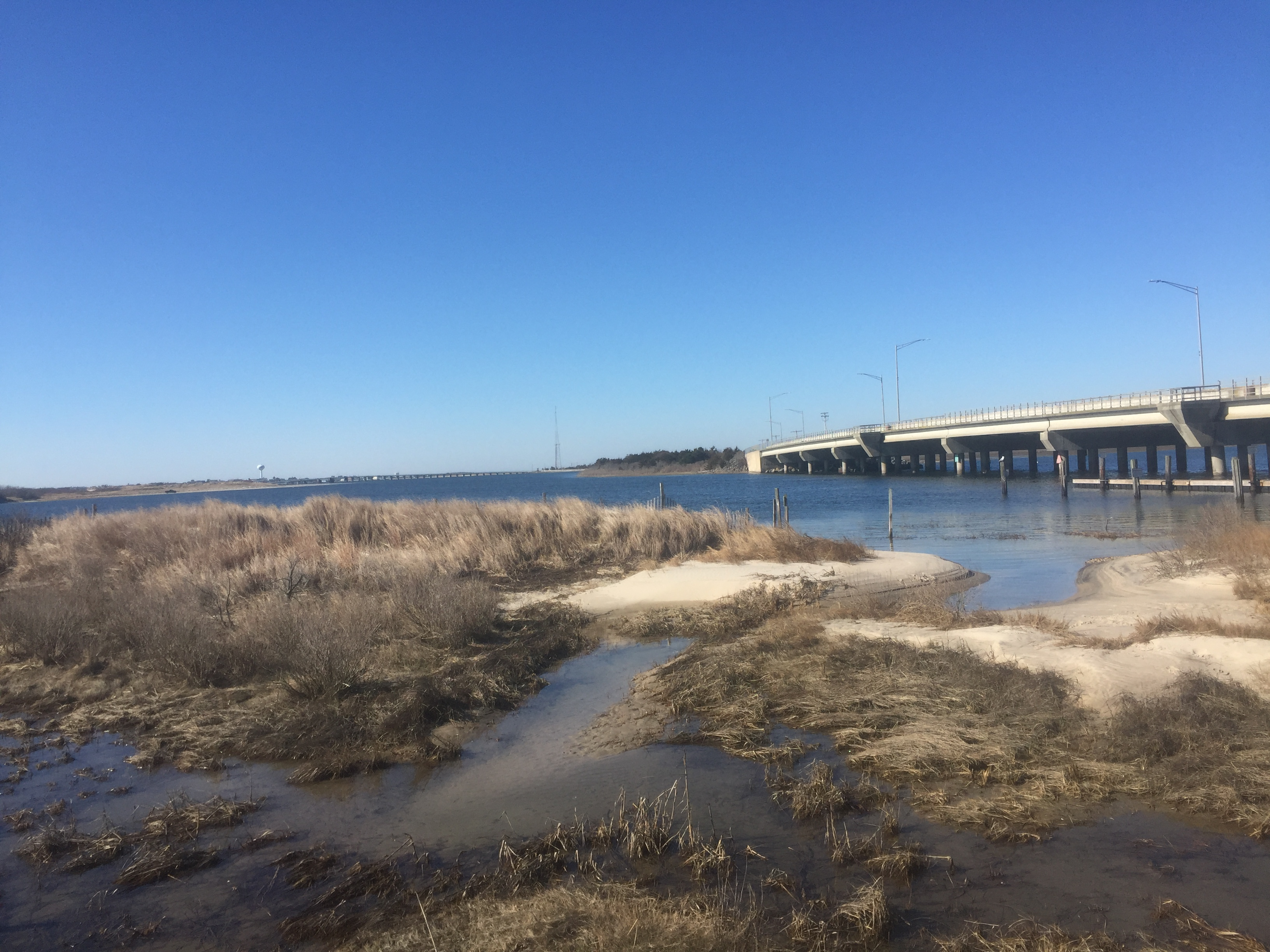
Corson's Inlet (looking southward) to a bridge carrying Ocean Drive

Beaches are open during the summer months.

Boating is allowed (regulated by the New Jersey Boating Regulation and Marine Law). The boat ramp is open 24 hours day, seven days a week year round. The boat ramp has a launch fee from Memorial Day to Labor Day.

Corson's Inlet provides excellent opportunities to catch bluefish, kingfish, striped bass and weakfish. Fishing is regulated by the New Jersey Department of Environmental Protection, as well. Fishermen are allowed to use four wheel drive vehicles (with permit) from September 16-May 14.

Pets are not permitted in the area during the nesting season.

== See also ==
- List of New Jersey state parks
