= Richard M. Atwater =

American chemist, public official (1844–1922)

Richard Mead Atwater, Sr.
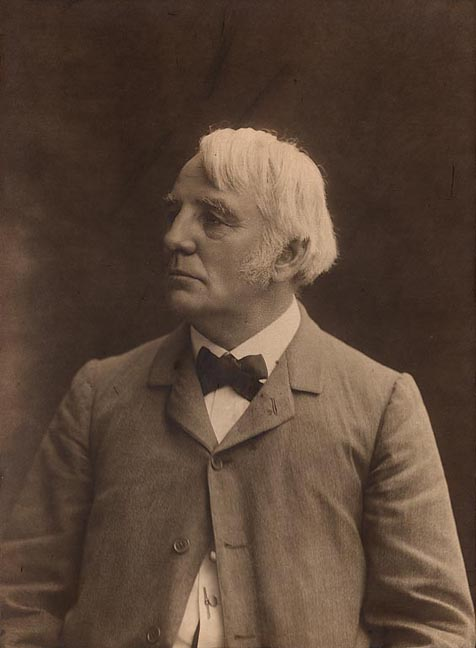
- Born: August 10, 1844; Providence, Rhode Island, U.S.
- Died: 1922 (aged 77–78); Chadds Ford, Pennsylvania, U.S.
- Occupation: Chemist
- Spouse: Abby Sophia Greene
- Children: Sophia Mead Atwater; Christopher Greene Atwater; Ethelwyn Morrill Atwater; Richard Mead Atwater, Jr. David Hastings Atwater; Anna Dorothea Atwater; Maxwell Wanton Atwater; Elizabeth Arnold Atwater; Marjory Garrison Atwater

Richard Mead Atwater, Sr. (August 10, 1844 – 1922) was a chemist and public official in New Jersey and Pennsylvania involved in early scientific glass-making.

== Early years ==
Atwater was born in Providence, Rhode Island, in 1844 into a Quaker family. His father, Stephen Atwater, was a civil engineer working on the Erie Canal, and later became the City Surveyor for Providence. His mother was Mary Weaver, who came from Hamilton, New York, the daughter of a Quaker minister. Atwater spent his first 21 years in Providence.

== Education ==
Atwater lost his father at the age of 10. He was obliged to work and help his widowed mother carry on with her five children, getting up before dawn six days a week to fold and deliver newspapers. The work did not pay much but he learned the value of networking. He attended public school until he was 15, then attended the Friends Boarding School of Providence.

After graduating, he taught for a term at a public school in Wakefield, Rhode Island, meeting local industrialist Roland Hazard, then moving on to teach at a local private school, where he met his future wife Abby Sophia Greene. He attended Brown University and graduated in 1865, and was made Quaker Trustee of Brown University in 1878. Immediately after graduating, he found employment in Millville, New Jersey as a tutor. He served a short term as Superintendent of Schools in Millville.

== Glass works ==
Atwater was soon hired as Assistant Manager in the manufacture of scientific glassmaking at the Millville glassworks of Whitall Tatum Company. In 1874, he was appointed traveling agent and was responsible for writing many contracts, visiting all the large cities in the north of the US, and as far west as San Francisco. In 1876, attending the Centennial Exposition, he saw an exhibit of foreign-made chemical glassware. He took the prompt to devise and patent accurate methods for constructing graduated cylinders, as well as reagent bottles with an embossed ground label, which were widely used. He also patented a portable finishing furnace for making glassware, and a variety of patterns for dispensing bottles in general use. In 1889, wanting to enhance his career and give his children better opportunities for education, he moved Germantown, a section of Philadelphia, where he worked at the main office of the Whitall Tatum glassworks.

== Marriage, family life, and mayor ==
Atwater married Abby Sophia Greene in 1867 in Providence, Rhode Island. Her family had lived in Greenwich since the Rhode Island colony was started by Roger Williams. Atwater and his wife had nine children, and as their family grew, purchased one of the first oceanside lots at Sea Isle City, New Jersey, where in 1881 he constructed the first summer beach house on the island. It was a simple square structure, built among the dunes, with an open cathedral ceiling two stories high, and bedrooms at the corners of both floors. The family vacationed there for four decades. Atwater was involved in many aspects of life in the town, became the Commodore of the Yacht Club for nine years, and was elected as Mayor of Sea Isle City from 1913 to 1917.

== Berlin ==
In the late 19th century, glass manufacturing in the United States lagged behind Europe. In 1890, Atwater took a leave of absence from the glassworks and went to Europe to learn more about glassmaking. Leaving his capable wife with her nine children for several months, he went to Berlin, where he studied the scientific manufacture of glass. Realizing that the subject would require more than a summer vacation, he rented an apartment and a piano and sent for his family who he enrolled in local schools. They enjoyed the German culture, enjoyed concerts and opera, found many new friends, and had many visits from relatives.

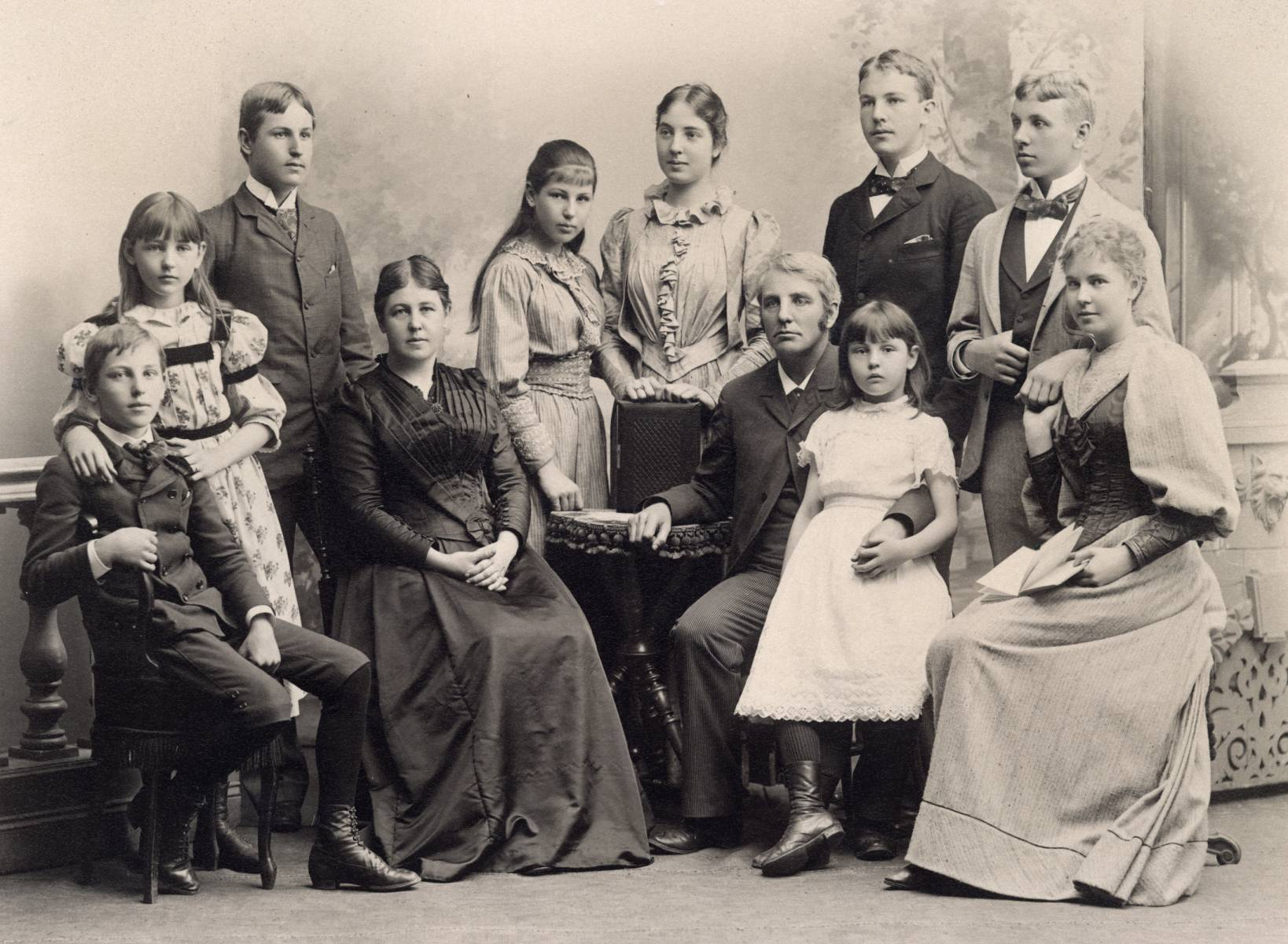
Richard M. Atwater and family in 1892.

== Syracuse ==
After three years the family returned to Syracuse, New York, where Atwater was recruited by Roland Hazard, the President of the Solvay Process Company (later Semet-Solvay Co.), eventually being appointed Secretary-Director and Field Agent, where he took an active part in the introduction of by-product coke ovens in the United States. During this time his older children went off to college, with two of the daughters attending Bryn Mawr College outside Philadelphia. In 1893 Atwater was a judge of glass at the Columbian Exposition in Chicago. After eight years, he was given a leave of absence from Semet-Solvay with full pay in appreciation of his work.

== Paris ==
In August 1900 Atwater attended the Paris Exposition with his wife. He was offered the position of Director of the European office for the Johnson Harvester Company, which after some consideration of the challenge he accepted. Again, he entered into the local culture, and after several months sent for his family. They resided in Paris for six years. The business, very different from his earlier experiences in the glass and chemical industry, was a general retail and wholesale operation in France and throughout Europe into Russia. Through his earlier experience in Berlin, Atwater had become familiar with the continental way of doing business, but he found the French language and customs unfamiliar. He ran the Paris office where only one clerk could speak English, learning French without any formal instruction. His freight and docking facilities for the shipping and receiving of goods were so well organized that when relief shipments were sent to France after World War I, the Harvester Docks in Paris were used for this purpose. During this time Richard and Abby Sophia were very active, enjoying tandem bike rides to destinations outside the city. The years were also successful for the business. At the end of the six-year term, the Johnson Harvester Company asked him to extend his contract, but by then all of the children had returned to America, and he had adequate savings for retirement.

== Honors and retirement ==
In 1904 Atwater attended the meeting of the International Chemical Congress in Berlin to present a paper on his work on glass graduates in Millville, New Jersey (from 1886), and was elected honorary Vice-President of the Congress. He was elected president of the American Chamber of Commerce in Paris and held that honor there until his return to the United States in 1906. Atwater retired in 1906 to a large farm in Chadds Ford in Delaware County, Pennsylvania, which contained the site of the Battle of Brandywine, eventually given to the state of Pennsylvania for Brandywine Battlefield State Park. Atwater put all of his 9 children through college, and 7 of them survived him, as well as 20 grandchildren. He died in 1922.
