= Ludlam's Beach Light =

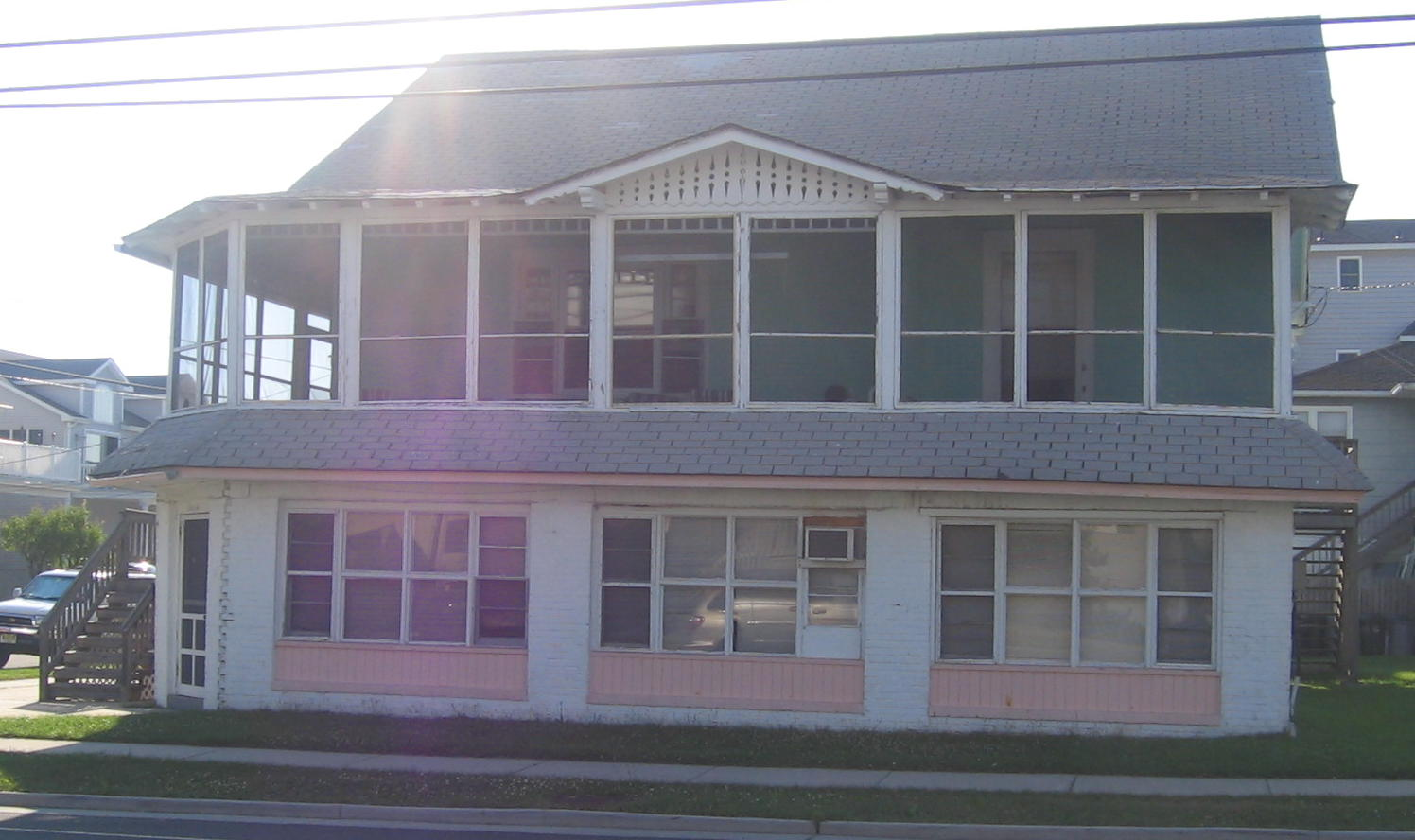
- The former lighthouse as a private residence in 2005.
- Location: Sea Isle City, New Jersey
- Coordinates: 39.15978°N 74.68807°W

Tower
- Constructed: 1885
- Automated: 1924 (skeleton tower)
- Height: 36 feet (11 m)
- Shape: Square

Light
- First lit: 1885
- Deactivated: 1924 (original structure); 1962 (skeleton tower)
- Lens: Fourth order Fresnel lens
- Range: 10.0 nautical miles; 18.5 kilometres (11.5 mi)
- Characteristic: Flashed white every fifteen seconds

Ludlam's Beach Light was a lighthouse formerly located in Sea Isle City, New Jersey. It was decommissioned in 1924 and converted to a private residence which was demolished in September 2010.

== History ==
Ludlam's Beach Light was constructed in 1885 in Sea Isle City, in Cape May County, New Jersey, United States, on Ludlam Island, close to the site of Life Saving Station Number 33. It was activated on November 3 of that year, with Joshua H. Reeves as its first keeper. It was built after Charles K. Landis, the founder of Sea Isle City, requested a light because of several shipwrecks off the island. The lighthouse was an "L-shaped", two-story, structure with a square light tower on top, located at 31st Street and the Boardwalk until 1924. The light, which flashed white every 15 seconds, was at an elevation of 36 feet (11 m), and could be seen approximately 10.0 nautical miles; 18.5 kilometres (11.5 mi) in clear weather. A glass panel was later installed on a segment of the lantern making it appear to flash red to ships that had strayed too close to the Townsend's Inlet sandbar.

The lighthouse's foundations and the seawall in front of it were damaged by a severe storm in September 1889. The storm threatened the light enough that the illumination apparatus was removed, and the lighthouse was temporarily abandoned. In 1899, a kitchen addition was added to the structure, and the next year, a concrete seawall was constructed. The last major improvement was the replacement of the oil wick lamp in the illuminating apparatus by an incandescent oil vapor lamp. On November 21, 1923, a fire was started when the keeper's dog knocked over a kerosene lantern, destroying part of the roof and the kitchen. A temporary roof patch was torn off in a storm in March 1924, and the structure was decommissioned. The structure was moved to 31st Street and Landis Avenue later that year, refurbished, and sold as a private residence. It was later moved to 3414 Landis.The original lighthouse was replaced by a 45 ft (14 m) steel skeleton tower on the beach, which flashed red every six seconds, and was visible approximately 10 nautical miles; 19 kilometres (12 mi). The automated tower was damaged in the Ash Wednesday Storm of 1962, and later dismantled. The original site of the light station is on the present 31st Street beach. Though usually buried under sand, parts of the lighthouse's foundations are occasionally uncovered after a large storm.

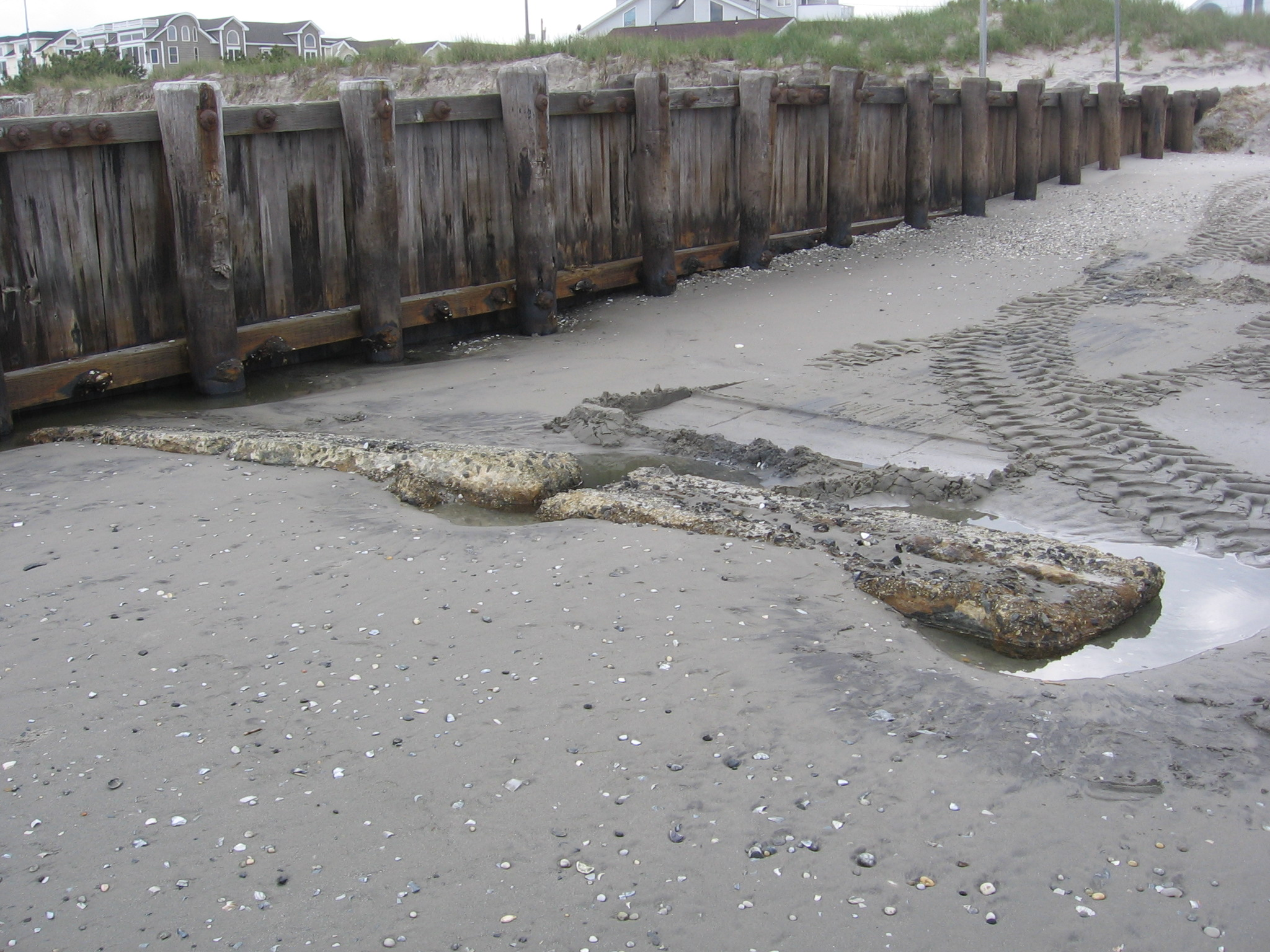
Original foundation of the lighthouse in May 2008

== Planned moving and restoration ==
After the current owners of the lighthouse building offered it for donation on the stipulation that it be moved to a new property, the Friends of Ludlam Beach Lighthouse organization began working with the City of Sea Isle to find a location to move the original structure. As of April 2009, a renovated Excursion Park or the planned Passive Park were the two most popular locations. If the structure had been moved, it was planned to restore it to its condition in 1900, and open it as a museum. By the summer of 2010, the Friends of Ludlam Beach Lighthouse had not reached their fund-raising goals, and the building was demolished on September 21, 2010 to make way for three private homes.

== Sources ==
- Sea Isle Times, Year 4, Volume 1
