= Sea Isle City, New Jersey =

City in Cape May County, New Jersey, US

- City
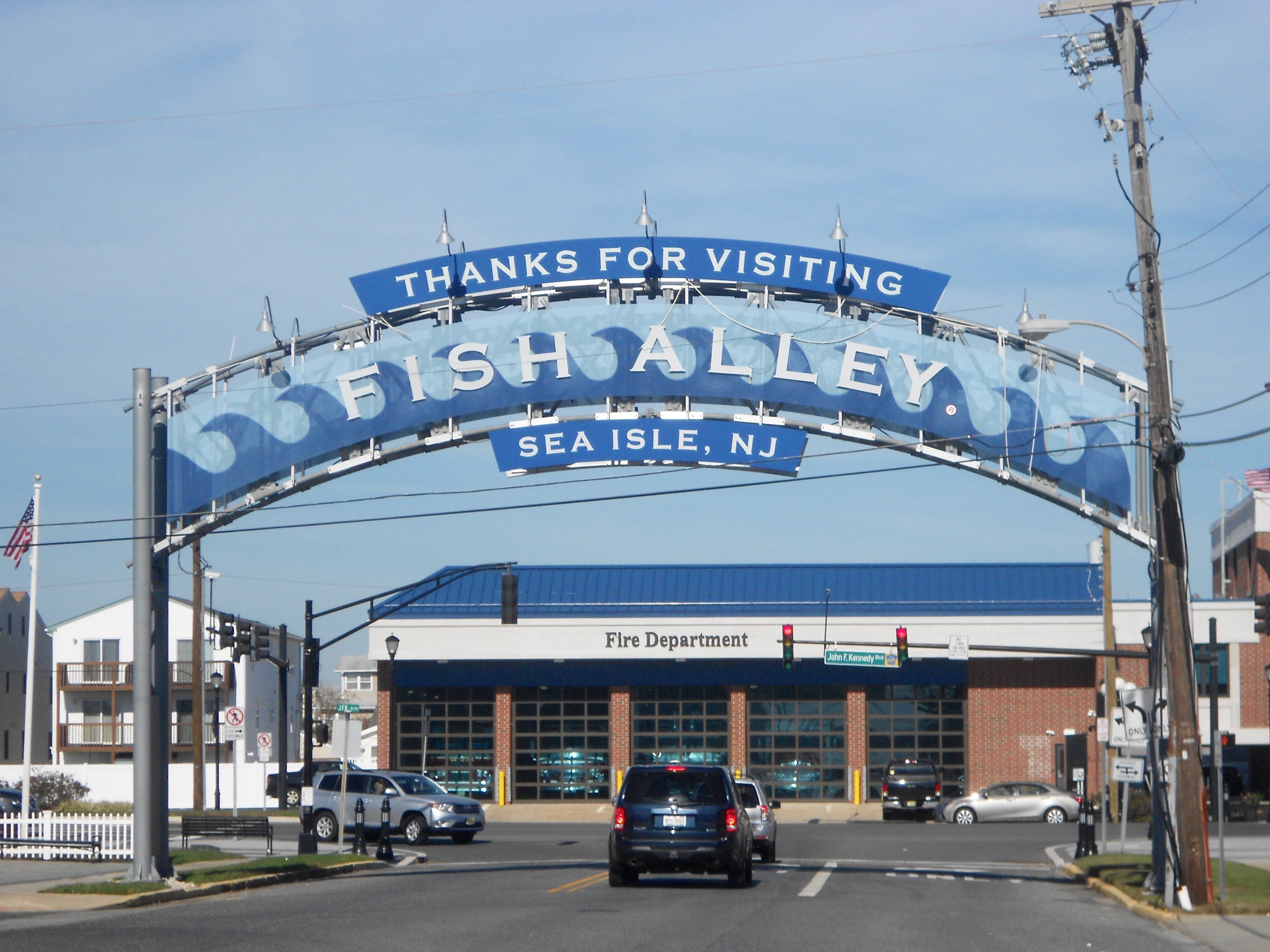
- Fish Alley and Fire Department

- Seal

- Location of Sea Isle City in Cape May County highlighted in red (left). Inset map: Location of Cape May County in New Jersey highlighted in orange (right).

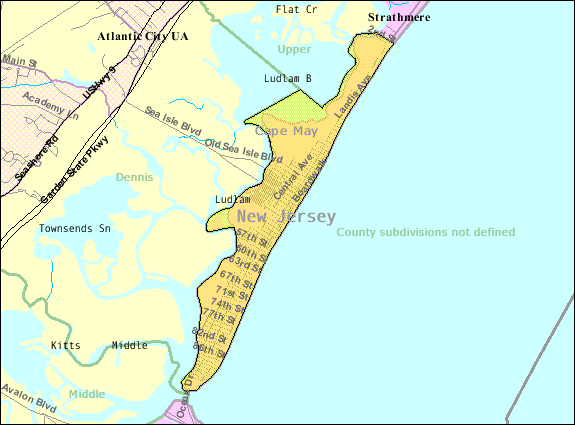
- Census Bureau map of Sea Isle City, New Jersey

- Location in Cape May County Location in New Jersey Location in the United States
- Coordinates: 39.150781°N 74.702732°W
- Country: United States
- State: New Jersey
- County: Cape May
- Incorporated: May 22, 1882

Government
  - Type: Faulkner Act (mayor–council)
  - Body: City Council
  - Mayor: Leonard C. Desiderio (term ends June 30, 2027)
  - Administrator: George Savastano
  - Municipal clerk: Shannon Romano

Area
  - Total: 2.75 sq mi (7.13 km^{2})
  - Land: 2.20 sq mi (5.71 km^{2})
  - Water: 0.55 sq mi (1.42 km^{2}) 19.93%
  - Rank: 361st of 565 in state 9th of 16 in county
- Elevation: 7 ft (2.1 m)

Population (2020)
  - Total: 2,104
  - Estimate (2023): 2,122
  - Rank: 483rd of 565 in state 11th of 16 in county
  - Density: 954.5/sq mi (368.5/km^{2})
  - Rank: 390th of 565 in state 8th of 16 in county
- Time zone: UTC−05:00 (Eastern (EST))
  - Summer (DST): UTC−04:00 (Eastern (EDT))
- ZIP Code: 08243
- Area code: 609 exchanges: 263, 427, 861
- FIPS code: 3400966390
- GNIS feature ID: 0885389
- Website: www.seaislecitynj.us

Sea Isle City is a city in Cape May County, in the U.S. state of New Jersey. The city, and all of Cape May County, is part of the South Jersey region of the state, along with the Ocean City metropolitan statistical area and the Philadelphia metropolitan area. As of the 2020 United States census, the city's year-round population was 2,104, a decrease of 10 (−0.5%) from the 2010 census count of 2,114, which in turn reflected a decline of 721 (−25.4%) from the 2,835 counted in the 2000 census. Visitors raise the population to as much as 40,000 during the peak summer season from Memorial Day to Labor Day. Sea Isle City is located on Ludlam Island, which also contains the Strathmere section of Upper Township.

Sea Isle City was originally incorporated as a borough on May 22, 1882, from portions of Dennis Township, based on the results of a referendum held six days earlier. The borough was reincorporated on March 31, 1890. In March 1907, portions of Dennis Township and Upper Township were annexed to Sea Isle City. In April 1905, portions of Sea Isle City were annexed to Upper Township. On April 30, 1907, the area was reincorporated as the City of Sea Isle City, based on the results of a referendum held on April 20, 1907. The name derives from its location on the Atlantic Ocean.

== History ==
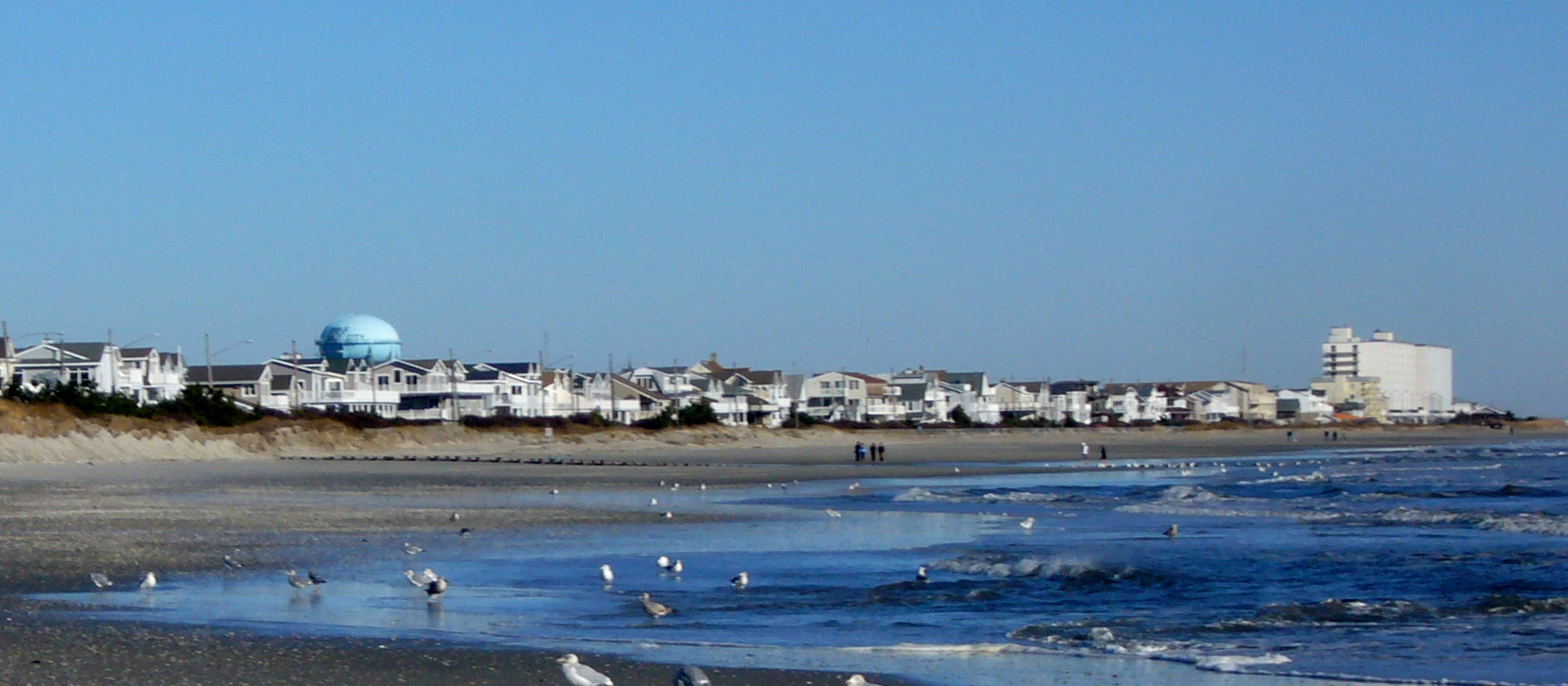
View from the beach

Sea Isle City was founded in 1882 by Charles K. Landis, who was also the founder of Vineland, New Jersey. The main street in town, Landis Avenue, is named for its founder. The oldest building in Sea Isle City is The Colonnade Inn, a Victorian building dating back to the 1800s. From 1885 until 1924, Sea Isle City was the location of Ludlam's Beach Lighthouse. The structure was moved to the corner of Landis Avenue and 35th Street (3414 Landis Avenue), and was a private residence (offered for rental) for many years. A non-profit group, The Friends of the Ludlam Beach Lighthouse, was unsuccessful in its efforts to raise enough money to save the building from demolition by moving it to a new location and restoring it. It was demolished on September 21, 2010, to make way for new town homes.

The oil tanker MV Sea Isle City was renamed for this city when it was reflagged and registered in the United States in 1987 during Operation Earnest Will. It was struck by a Silkworm missile off Kuwait on October 16, 1987, wounding 18 crew members and seriously damaging the ship.

=== Coastal storms ===
There have been many hurricanes and huge storms that have hit the small island of Sea Isle City, New Jersey. The storms of the 1890s, 1920s, and the 1944 Great Atlantic Hurricane have been some of the worst natural disasters to hit the coast of New Jersey. The Ash Wednesday Storm of 1962, a major Nor'easter that hit on March 6, 1962, tops all other storms that have hit the area in the recent past, with three days of continuous rain. Many people evacuated in time to save their lives, but came back to find their homes and assets destroyed. Eventually, the only way out of town was the causeway, and when that flooded, rescuers had to use helicopters to evacuate the rest of the town. It was categorized as a "100-year storm," in which almost every beachfront home or property was destroyed or damaged.

About a week later when the storm had subsided, Sea Isle City citizens moved back into their homes and began the needed revisions. As a result of the storm, a "dune line" was formed, and this caused beachfront businesses and homes to move back from the shoreline an average of one block.

=== Tourism ===
Sea Isle City has long been popular with summer visitors and has made efforts to draw tourists beyond its "cheerful but sleepy profile". The printed message on its signature water tower was changed from "Welcome to Sea Isle City" to "Smile! You're in Sea Isle City".

The "Sara the Turtle Festival" is one of the city's annual festivals, celebrating a fictional turtle named Sara. Aimed towards families with young children, the festival features live animal exhibits and face painting meant to educate children about the local environment. The city hosts a Polar bear plunge every February, holding the 25th annual event in 2019, featuring many participants dressed in costume.

In 1999, the city's only amusement park, Fun City, was closed and the land was sold for development of beach homes. In 2009, a new amusement park called Gillian's Funland was opened on JFK Boulevard by the bay as a public-private venture between Sea Isle City and neighboring Ocean City mayor Jay Gillian. Funland was permanently removed, however, following the 2013 summer season for financial reasons in part due to losses from Hurricane Sandy.

In 2011, Sea Isle City began a $14 million makeover to create a public corridor from the bay to the ocean. Plans included a new boathouse on the marina, installing a new playground and basketball courts on JFK Boulevard and erecting a pavilion and band shell at Excursion Park on the city's Promenade overlooking the Atlantic Ocean. Sea Isle City became one of the first municipalities in New Jersey, along with Salem and Egg Harbor City, to implement LED streetlights powered solely by wind and solar energy. The lights were installed at the Promenade at JFK Boulevard by the South Jersey Economic Development District and the New Jersey Institute of Technology.

== Geography ==
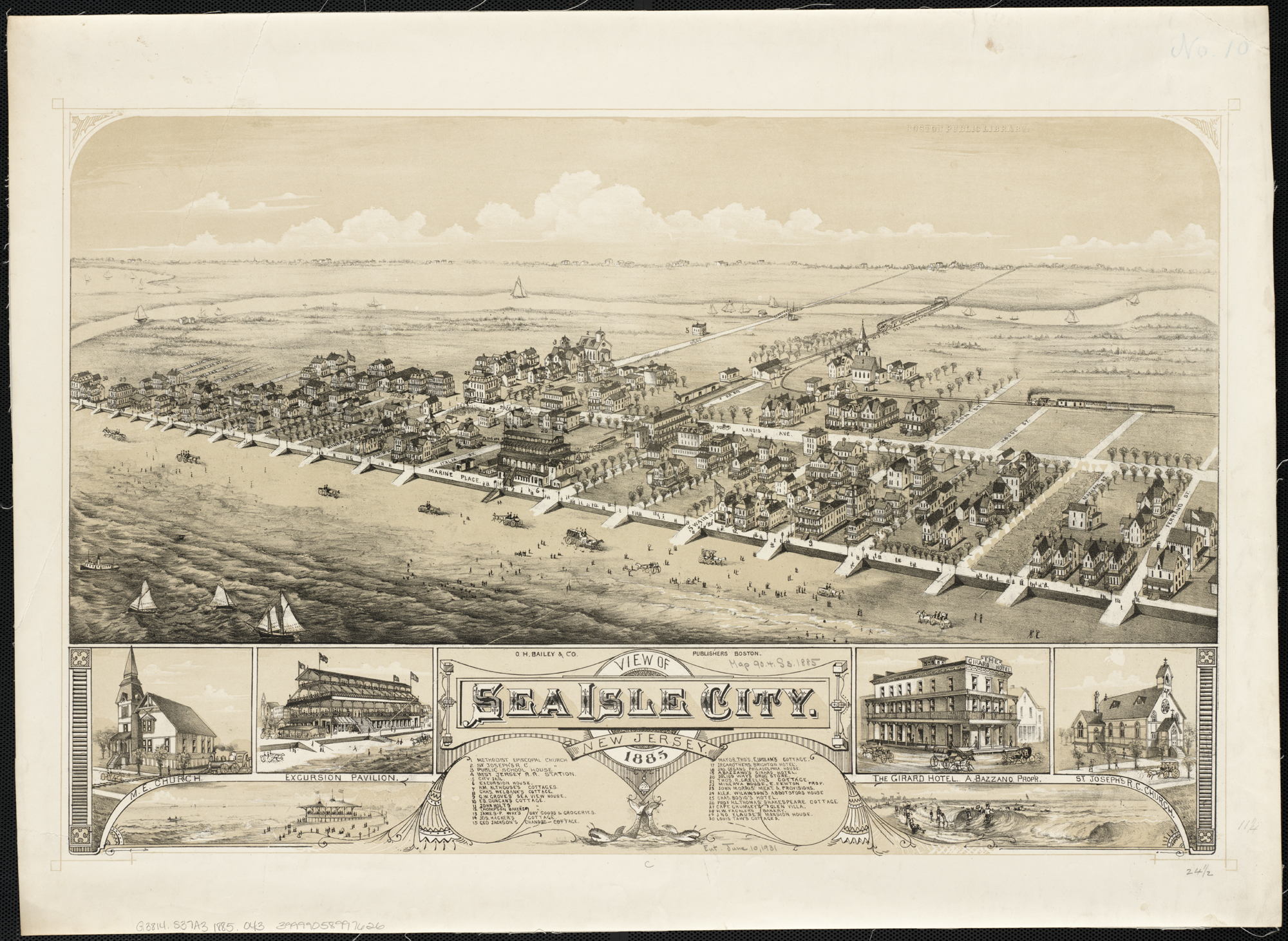
Bird's-eye view of the town in 1885

According to the United States Census Bureau, the city had a total area of 2.75 square miles (7.13 km^{2}), including 2.20 square miles (5.71 km^{2}) of land and 0.55 square miles (1.42 km^{2}) of water (19.93%).

Sea Isle City is a beach town with most of its housing used for vacation rentals and second homes. It has a 1.5-mile (2.4 km) beachfront promenade starting at 29th Street and ending on 57th street and several arcades, shops, restaurants and bars in the center of town. The epicenter of the town is John F. Kennedy Blvd. (41st Street).

Sea Isle is not an "island city" as it shares its land on Ludlam Island with Strathmere, which is part of Upper Township. Neighboring Ocean City, however, is an island city as it includes the entire island.

Unincorporated communities, localities and place names located partially or completely within the city include Ludlam Beach and Townsends Inlet (located at the south end of Ludlam Island).

The city contains a small Italian-American enclave and community known as Fish Alley, formed by poor Italian immigrant fishermen and their families. The enclave, originally consisting of shanties, contains various docks, ports, and Venetian-style canals, and it still serves as a port and home for multigenerational Italian-American fishermen. Fish Alley is also home to various dockside Italian seafood restaurants that are largely supplied by, owned by, and sustained by the Sea Isle City Italian-American fisherman community.

Sea Isle City borders Avalon Borough, Dennis Township, Middle Township, and Upper Township, along with the Atlantic Ocean.

== Demographics ==
Historical population
Census	Pop.	Note	%±
1890	776		—
1900	340		−56.2%
1910	551		62.1%
1920	564		2.4%
1930	850		50.7%
1940	773		−9.1%
1950	993		28.5%
1960	1,393		40.3%
1970	1,712		22.9%
1980	2,644		54.4%
1990	2,692		1.8%
2000	2,835		5.3%
2010	2,114		−25.4%
2020	2,104		−0.5%
2023 (est.)	2,122		0.9%
Population sources: 1890–2000 1890–1920 1890; 1890–1910 1910–1930; 1940–2000 2000; 2010 2020

=== 2020 census ===
As of the 2020 census, Sea Isle City had a population of 2,104. The median age was 63.7 years. 7.5% of residents were under the age of 18 and 46.6% of residents were 65 years of age or older. For every 100 females there were 92.1 males, and for every 100 females age 18 and over there were 91.7 males age 18 and over.

100.0% of residents lived in urban areas, while 0.0% lived in rural areas.

There were 1,098 households in Sea Isle City, of which 9.6% had children under the age of 18 living in them. Of all households, 49.4% were married-couple households, 18.8% were households with a male householder and no spouse or partner present, and 27.8% were households with a female householder and no spouse or partner present. About 37.7% of all households were made up of individuals and 22.4% had someone living alone who was 65 years of age or older.

There were 6,992 housing units, of which 84.3% were vacant. The homeowner vacancy rate was 3.3% and the rental vacancy rate was 59.1%.

Racial composition as of the 2020 census
Race	Number	Percent
White	2,007	95.4%
Black or African American	8	0.4%
American Indian and Alaska Native	5	0.2%
Asian	11	0.5%
Native Hawaiian and Other Pacific Islander	0	0.0%
Some other race	29	1.4%
Two or more races	44	2.1%
Hispanic or Latino (of any race)	57	2.7%

=== 2010 census ===
The 2010 United States census counted 2,114 people, 1,041 households, and 646 families in the city. The population density was 974.5 per square mile (376.3/km^{2}). There were 6,900 housing units at an average density of 3,180.8 per square mile (1,228.1/km^{2}). The racial makeup was 98.63% (2,085) White, 0.09% (2) Black or African American, 0.24% (5) Native American, 0.19% (4) Asian, 0.00% (0) Pacific Islander, 0.47% (10) from other races, and 0.38% (8) from two or more races. Hispanic or Latino of any race were 2.41% (51) of the population.

Of the 1,041 households, 9.8% had children under the age of 18; 50.0% were married couples living together; 8.0% had a female householder with no husband present and 37.9% were non-families. Of all households, 34.1% were made up of individuals and 16.9% had someone living alone who was 65 years of age or older. The average household size was 2.03 and the average family size was 2.54.

10.7% of the population were under the age of 18, 6.1% from 18 to 24, 13.2% from 25 to 44, 37.6% from 45 to 64, and 32.3% who were 65 years of age or older. The median age was 58.1 years. For every 100 females, the population had 97.9 males. For every 100 females ages 18 and older there were 97.4 males.

The Census Bureau's 2006–2010 American Community Survey showed that (in 2010 inflation-adjusted dollars) median household income was $54,715 (with a margin of error of +/– $9,859) and the median family income was $80,219 (+/– $21,265). Males had a median income of $66,771 (+/– $34,710) versus $44,087 (+/– $6,534) for females. The per capita income for the borough was $47,174 (+/– $10,684). About 3.1% of families and 7.4% of the population were below the poverty line, including none of those under age 18 and 3.9% of those age 65 or over.

=== 2000 census ===
As of the 2000 United States census there were 2,835 people, 1,370 households, and 794 families residing in the city. The population density was 1,287.3 inhabitants per square mile (497.0/km^{2}). There were 6,622 housing units at an average density of 1, 162.2/km^{2} (3,006.9/sq mi). The racial makeup of the city was 97.88% White, 0.28% African American, 0.39% Native American, 0.35% Asian, 0.04% Pacific Islander, 0.07% from other races, and 0.99% from two or more races. Hispanic or Latino of any race were 1.06% of the population.

As of the 2000 Census, 30.5% of Sea Isle City residents were of Irish ancestry, the 34th-highest percentage of any municipality in the United States, and sixth-highest in New Jersey, among all places with more than 1,000 residents identifying their ancestry.

There were 1,370 households, out of which 15.5% had children under the age of 18 living with them, 48.2% were married couples living together, 6.9% had a female householder with no husband present, and 42.0% were non-families. 37.4% of all households were made up of individuals, and 18.5% had someone living alone who was 65 years of age or older. The average household size was 2.07 and the average family size was 2.71.

In the city, the population was spread out, with 15.7% under the age of 18, 5.1% from 18 to 24, 20.8% from 25 to 44, 31.4% from 45 to 64, and 27.1% who were 65 years of age or older. The median age was 51 years. For every 100 females, there were 91.4 males. For every 100 females age 18 and over, there were 89.6 males.

The median income for a household in the city was $45,708, and the median income for a family was $62,847. Males had a median income of $42,713 versus $31,375 for females. The per capita income for the city was $28,754. About 6.4% of families and 7.6% of the population were below the poverty line, including 13.7% of those under age 18 and 10.2% of those age 65 or over.

== Government ==
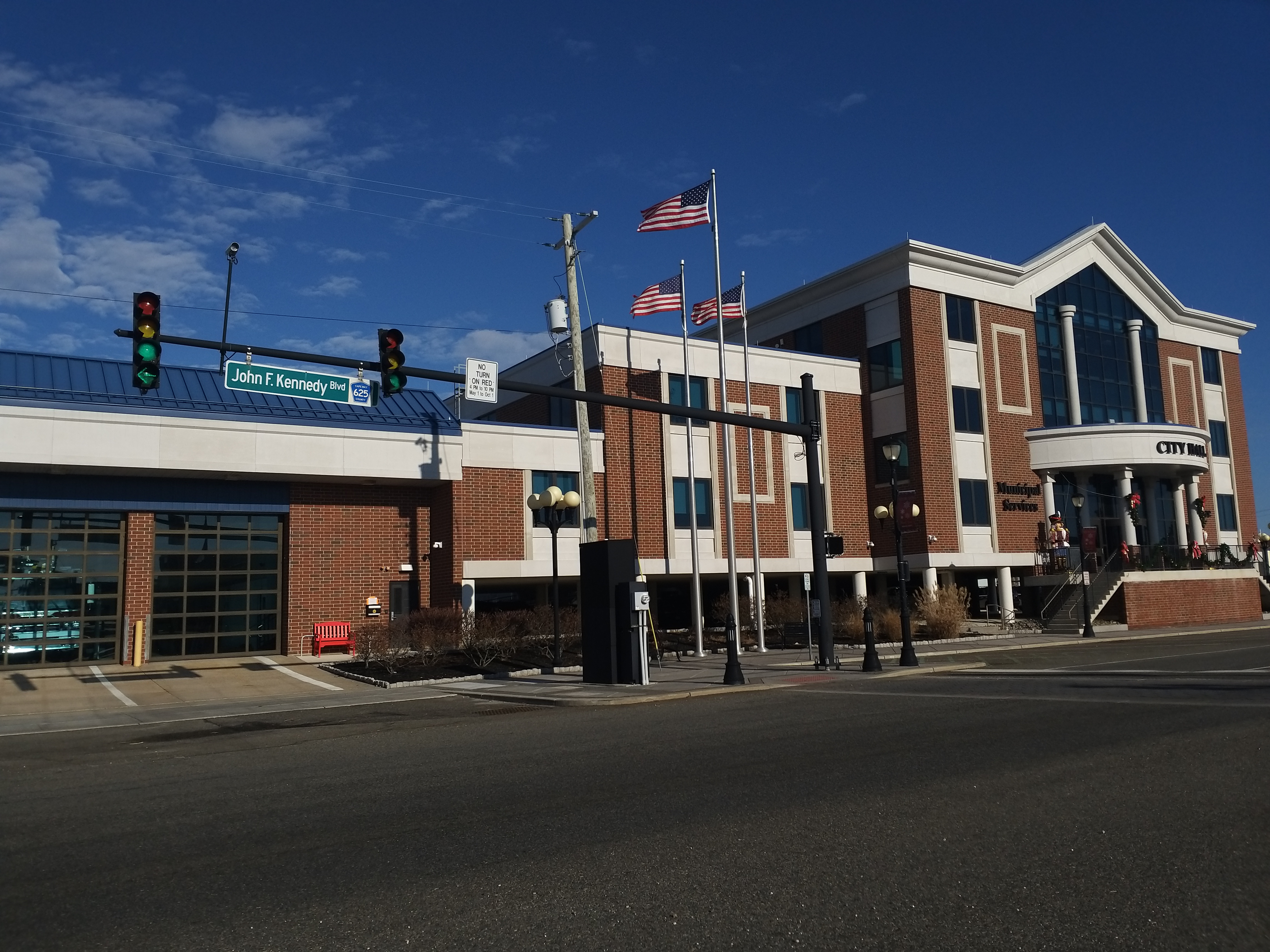
City hall

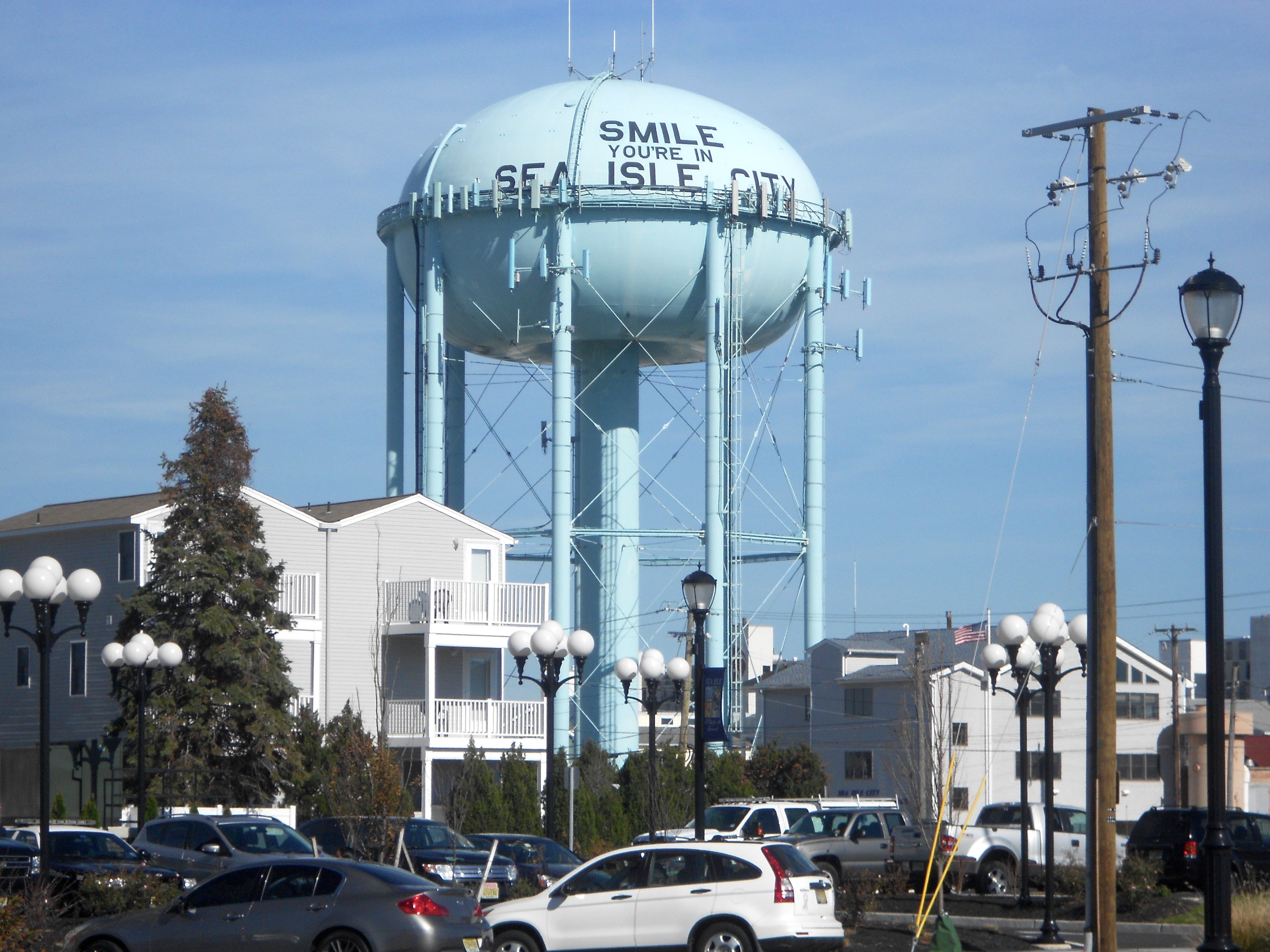
Water tower

=== Local government ===
Since July 1, 2007, Sea Isle City has been governed within the Faulkner Act, formally known as the Optional Municipal Charter Law, under the Mayor-Council form of government. The city is one of 71 municipalities (of the 564) statewide that use this form of government. The governing body is comprised of the Mayor and the five-member City Council. The mayor and council members serve four-year terms of office and are chosen at-large on a non-partisan basis as part of the May municipal elections. Either three council seats or two council seats and the mayoral seat are up for election in odd-numbered years. Prior to 2007, Sea Isle City had been governed under the Walsh Act form of New Jersey municipal government, by a three-member commission, starting in 1913.

As of July 2023, the Mayor of Sea Isle City is Leonard C. Desiderio, whose term of office ends on June 30, 2023. Members of the City Council are Council President Mary L. Tighe (2025), Frank P. Edwardi Jr. (2027), J. B. Feeley (2025), Jack C. Gibson (2025) and William J. Kehner Sr. (2027).

=== Federal, state and county representation ===
Sea Isle City is located in the 2nd Congressional District and is part of New Jersey's 1st state legislative district.

For the 119th United States Congress, New Jersey's 2nd congressional district is represented by Jeff Van Drew (R, Dennis Township). New Jersey is represented in the United States Senate by Democrats Cory Booker (Newark, term ends 2027) and Andy Kim (Moorestown, term ends 2031).

For the 2026–2027 session, the 1st legislative district of the New Jersey Legislature is represented in the State Senate by Mike Testa (R, Vineland) and in the General Assembly by Antwan McClellan (R, Ocean City) and Erik K. Simonsen (R, Lower Township).

Cape May County is governed by a five-person Board of County Commissioners whose members are elected at-large on a partisan basis to three-year terms of office on a staggered basis, with either one or two seats coming up for election each year; At an annual reorganization held each January, the commissioners select one member to serve as director and another to serve as vice-director. As of 2026, Cape May County's Commissioners are Director Leonard C. Desiderio (R, Sea Isle City, term as commissioner ends December 31, 2027; term as director ends 2026), Vice-Director Andrew Bulakowski (R, Lower Township; term as commissioner ends 2028; term as vice-director ends 2026). Robert Barr (R, Ocean City; 2028) and Will Morey (R, Wildwood Crest; 2026), with one seat expiring in December 2026 vacant after Melanie Collette resigned from office in March 2026. The county's constitutional officers are Clerk Rita Marie Rothberg (R, Ocean City; 2030), Sheriff Robert Nolan (R, Lower Township; 2026) and Surrogate E. Marie Hayes (R, Ocean City; 2028).

=== Politics ===
As of March 2011, there were a total of 2,060 registered voters in Sea Isle City, of which 340 (16.5%) were registered as Democrats, 1,090 (52.9%) were registered as Republicans and 629 (30.5%) were registered as Unaffiliated. There was one voter registered to another party.

Gubernatorial election results for Sea Isle City
Year	Republican		Democratic		Third party(ies)	
Year	No.	%	No.	%	No.	%
2025	737	58.59%	515	40.94%	6	0.48%
2021	747	64.29%	412	35.46%	3	0.26%
2017	581	61.42%	351	37.10%	14	1.48%
2013	936	81.18%	206	17.87%	11	0.95%
2009	753	61.17%	409	33.23%	69	5.61%
2005	674	57.71%	448	38.36%	46	3.94%

In the 2012 presidential election, Republican Mitt Romney received 60.4% of the vote (916 cast), ahead of Democrat Barack Obama with 38.7% (587 votes), and other candidates with 0.9% (13 votes), among the 1,532 ballots cast by the city's 2,082 registered voters (16 ballots were spoiled), for a turnout of 73.6%. In the 2008 presidential election, Republican John McCain received 58.6% of the vote (977 cast), ahead of Democrat Barack Obama, who received 40.1% (669 votes), with 1,668 ballots cast among the city's 2,041 registered voters, for a turnout of 81.7%. In the 2004 presidential election, Republican George W. Bush received 61.7% of the vote (1,041 ballots cast), outpolling Democrat John Kerry, who received 37.0% (625 votes), with 1,687 ballots cast among the city's 2,177 registered voters, for a turnout percentage of 77.5.

Presidential elections results
Year	Republican	Democratic
2024	56.5% 803	40.8% 580
2020	57.9% 879	41.0% 622
2016	63.0% 891	33.9% 480
2012	60.4% 916	38.7% 587
2008	58.6% 977	40.1% 669
2004	61.7% 1,041	37.0% 625

In the 2013 gubernatorial election, Republican Chris Christie received 81.2% of the vote (936 cast), ahead of Democrat Barbara Buono with 17.9% (206 votes), and other candidates with 1.0% (11 votes), among the 1,172 ballots cast by the city's 2,033 registered voters (19 ballots were spoiled), for a turnout of 57.6%. In the 2009 gubernatorial election, Republican Chris Christie received 59.6% of the vote (753 ballots cast), ahead of both Democrat Jon Corzine with 32.4% (409 votes) and Independent Chris Daggett with 4.6% (58 votes), with 1,264 ballots cast among the city's 2,094 registered voters, yielding a 60.4% turnout.

United States Senate election results for Sea Isle City1
Year	Republican		Democratic		Third party(ies)	
Year	No.	%	No.	%	No.	%
2024	799	58.24%	554	40.38%	19	1.38%
2018	832	68.76%	331	27.36%	47	3.88%
2012	842	62.19%	494	36.48%	18	1.33%
2006	911	64.06%	491	34.53%	20	1.41%

United States Senate election results for Sea Isle City2
Year	Republican		Democratic		Third party(ies)	
Year	No.	%	No.	%	No.	%
2020	846	58.30%	595	41.01%	10	0.69%
2014	586	65.33%	300	33.44%	11	1.23%
2013	414	63.99%	225	34.78%	8	1.24%
2008	907	61.78%	540	36.78%	21	1.43%

== Education ==
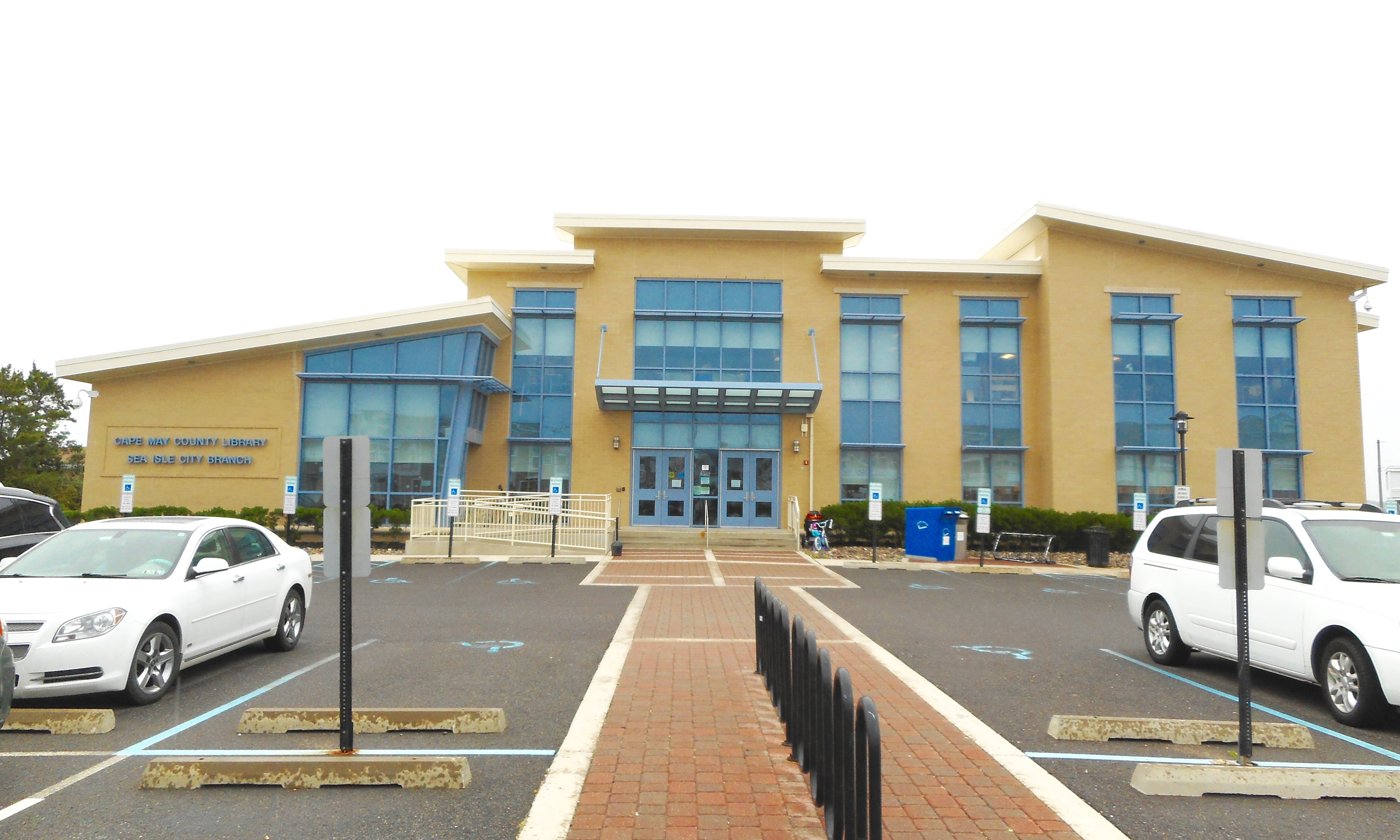
Cape May County Library Sea Isle City Branch

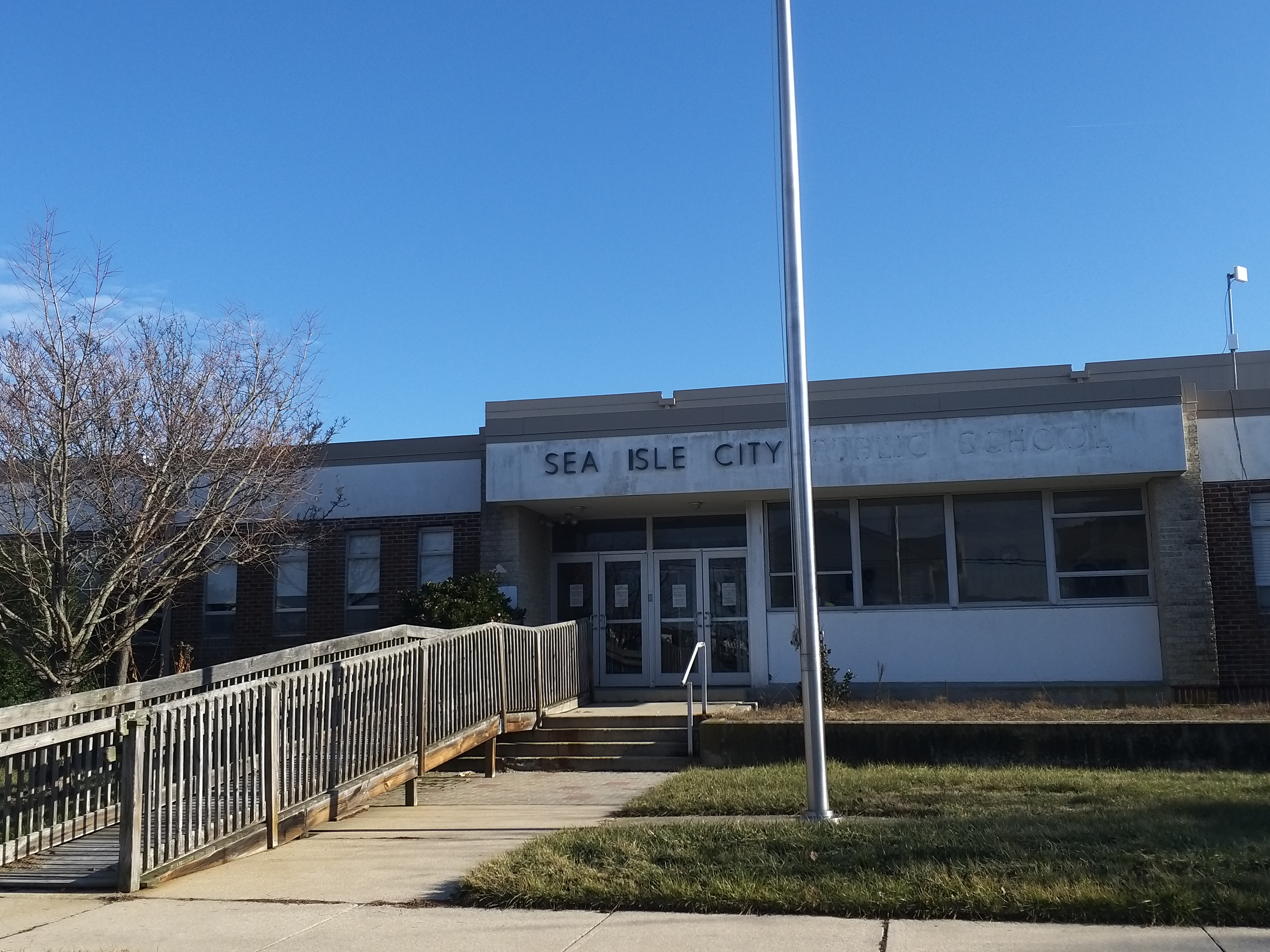
The former Sea Isle City Public School

Resident public school students had been served by a school operated by the Sea Isle City School District until the end of the 2012 school year. Merger discussions with the Ocean City School District in 2008 ended after the Ocean City district indicated that it did not want to accept Sea Isle City's tenured teachers, which it would be required to do under state law. Sea Isle City had been spending as much as $35,000 per student and hoped to see savings through the merger, even after adding in transportation costs. The Sea Isle City district graduated its last eighth-grade class in June 2009 and with the 2010–2011 school year, students from Sea Isle City started attending the Ocean City schools starting in fifth grade. As of June 30, 2012, Sea Isle City School District no longer operates any schools, in the face of an order by the commissioner of the New Jersey Department of Education that was based on declining enrollment and budgetary issues. In March 2023, the Sea Isle City Public School was demolished to clear ground for a planned $20 million community center due to be completed in 2025.

All Sea Isle City students in public school for pre-kindergarten through twelfth grade are served by the Ocean City School District. As of the 2020–21 school year, the district, comprised of three schools, had an enrollment of 2,056 students and 220.4 classroom teachers (on an FTE basis), for a student–teacher ratio of 9.3:1. Schools in the district (with 2020–21 enrollment data from the National Center for Education Statistics) are Ocean City Primary School with 299 students in grades PreK-3, Ocean City Intermediate School with 468 students in grades 4-8 and Ocean City High School with 1,274 students in grades 9–12. Students from Corbin City, Longport and Upper Township attend Ocean City High School for ninth through twelfth grades as part of sending/receiving relationships with their respective school districts.

Students are also eligible to attend Cape May County Technical High School in the Cape May Court House area, which serves students from the entire county in its comprehensive and vocational programs, which are offered without charge to students who are county residents. Special needs students may be referred to Cape May County Special Services School District in the Cape May Court House area.

The Roman Catholic Diocese of Camden operates Bishop McHugh Regional School, a Catholic K–8 school, in the Ocean View area, Dennis Township, which has a Cape May Courthouse postal address. It is the parish school of Sea Isle City Catholic Church and three other churches.

Cape May County Library operates Sea Isle City Branch Library.

== Transportation ==
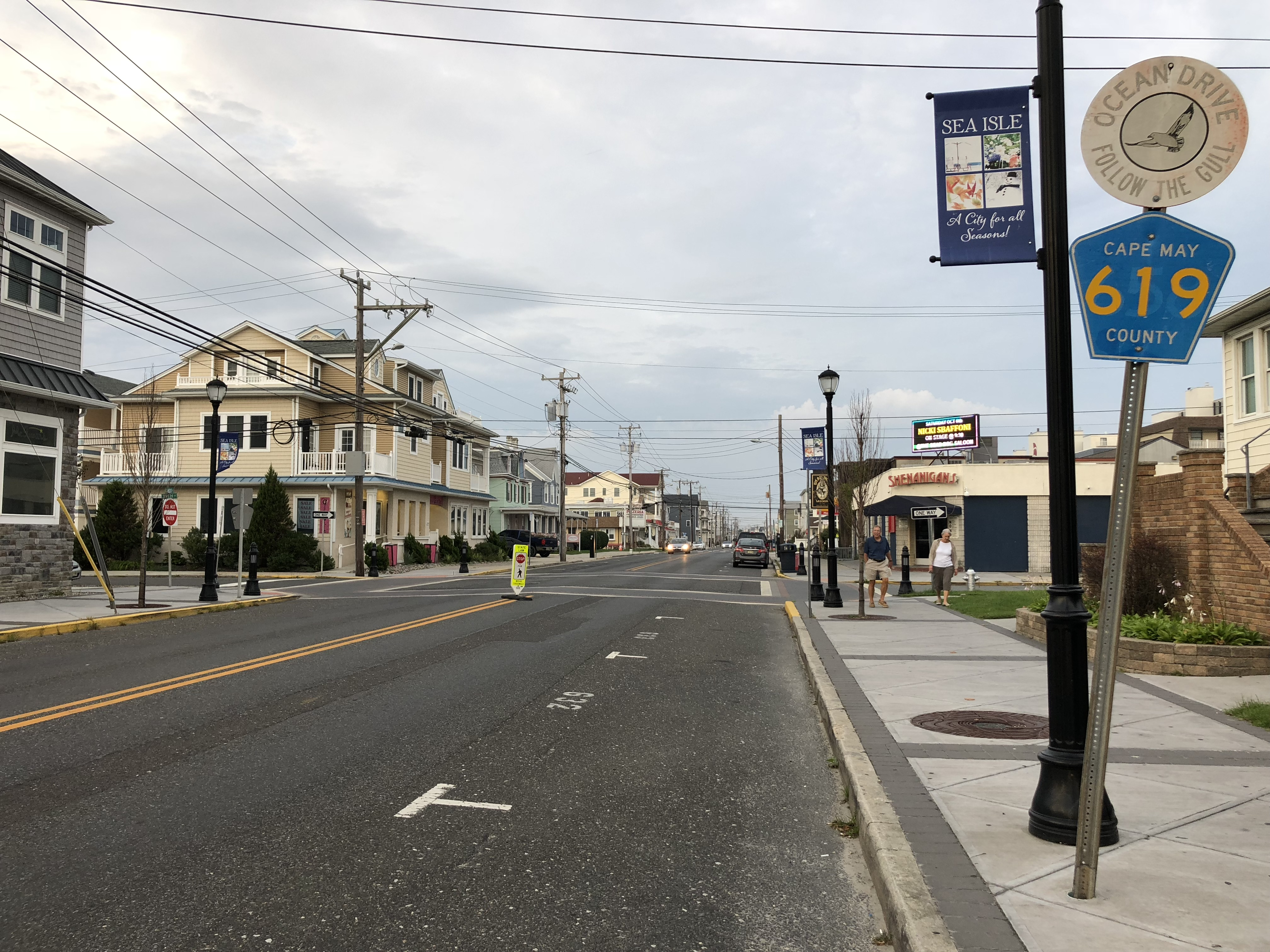
Landis Boulevard (County Route 619) in Sea Isle City

=== Roads and highways ===
The city had a total of 33.06 miles (53.20 km) of roadways, of which 27.53 miles (44.31 km) were maintained by the municipality and 5.53 miles (8.90 km) by Cape May County.

Exit 17 on the southbound Garden State Parkway in Dennis Township provides access to Sea Isle City via Sea Isle Boulevard (County Route 625), which becomes JFK Boulevard. Landis Boulevard (County Route 619) follows the ocean and forms part of Ocean Drive, traversing 5 miles (8.0 km) across the city, from the Strathmere section of Upper Township in the north to Avalon in the south.

Turtle awareness is an important aspect in Sea Isle City. There are numerous signs in the city to watch for turtle crossings in order to prevent further endangerment of the species. One of the more common species of turtles located on the island is the diamondback terrapin. Due to coastal development, natural turtle nesting areas have deteriorated, leading the turtles to create their nesting areas on highway embankments and increased risk of being struck by a motor vehicle. From 1989 to 1995, a total of 4,020 turtles were killed in Cape May Peninsula.

=== Public transportation ===
NJ Transit offers the 315 inter-city bus route that runs through the town three times a day and shuttles people to and from Philadelphia, and the 319 route to the Port Authority Bus Terminal in Midtown Manhattan. However, due to weight restrictions on the Townsend Inlet Bridge, New Jersey Transit 315/319 bus service only stops on Central Avenue and JFK Boulevard. Service was previously suspended due to summer traffic until a deal has been reached.

Sea Isle City used to have a trackless trolley service that operated along Landis Avenue. Since 2013, Atlantic City Jitney has served Sea Isle City with a route running along Landis Avenue from June through September.

Rail service was provided to the island by both the Atlantic City Railroad, a subsidiary of the Philadelphia and Reading Railway, and the West Jersey and Seashore Railroad, owned by the rival Pennsylvania Railroad. The Atlantic City Railroad's line was a continuation of its line to Ocean City, running across Corson's Inlet and through Strathmere. The West Jersey and Seashore Railroad tracks branched from the Cape May Line at Sea Isle Junction, and entered the city at 41st Street, from where it continued south to Stone Harbor. The train was in use from the early 1900s until the mid-1930s after the merger of the two railroads when the tracks were removed and the streets were paved due to increased use of cars.

== Climate ==
According to the Köppen climate classification system, Sea Isle City has a humid subtropical climate (Cfa) with hot, moderately humid summers, cool winters and year-around precipitation. Cfa climates are characterized by all months having an average mean temperature above 32.0 °F (0.0 °C), at least four months with an average mean temperature at or above 50.0 °F (10.0 °C), at least one month with an average mean temperature at or above 71.6 °F (22.0 °C) and no significant precipitation difference between seasons. During the summer months in Sea Isle City, a cooling afternoon sea breeze is present on most days, but episodes of extreme heat and humidity can occur with heat index values at or above 95.0 °F (35.0 °C). During the winter months, episodes of extreme cold and wind can occur with wind chill values below 0.0 °F (−17.8 °C). The plant hardiness zone at Sea Isle City Beach is 7b with an average annual extreme minimum air temperature of 5.5 °F (−14.7 °C). The average seasonal (November–April) snowfall total is 12 to 18 inches (30 to 46 cm), and the average snowiest month is February which corresponds with the annual peak in nor'easter activity.

Climate data for Sea Isle City Beach, NJ (1981–2010 Averages)
Month	Jan	Feb	Mar	Apr	May	Jun	Jul	Aug	Sep	Oct	Nov	Dec	Year
Mean daily maximum °F (°C)	42.2 (5.7)	44.2 (6.8)	51.1 (10.6)	60.9 (16.1)	70.2 (21.2)	79.1 (26.2)	83.7 (28.7)	82.3 (27.9)	76.7 (24.8)	66.2 (19.0)	56.8 (13.8)	47.0 (8.3)	63.5 (17.5)
Daily mean °F (°C)	34.2 (1.2)	36.2 (2.3)	42.7 (5.9)	52.1 (11.2)	61.4 (16.3)	70.6 (21.4)	75.7 (24.3)	74.5 (23.6)	68.3 (20.2)	57.5 (14.2)	48.3 (9.1)	39.0 (3.9)	55.1 (12.8)
Mean daily minimum °F (°C)	26.2 (−3.2)	28.1 (−2.2)	34.1 (1.2)	43.3 (6.3)	52.5 (11.4)	62.1 (16.7)	67.7 (19.8)	66.7 (19.3)	59.9 (15.5)	48.8 (9.3)	39.8 (4.3)	30.9 (−0.6)	46.8 (8.2)
Average precipitation inches (mm)	3.34 (85)	2.89 (73)	4.26 (108)	3.70 (94)	3.50 (89)	3.19 (81)	3.78 (96)	4.27 (108)	3.45 (88)	3.65 (93)	3.35 (85)	3.72 (94)	43.10 (1,095)
Average relative humidity (%)	66.8	65.4	62.5	62.3	66.6	70.9	70.9	73.3	71.4	70.3	68.2	67.1	68.0
Average dew point °F (°C)	24.3 (−4.3)	25.7 (−3.5)	30.8 (−0.7)	39.6 (4.2)	50.2 (10.1)	60.7 (15.9)	65.6 (18.7)	65.4 (18.6)	58.7 (14.8)	47.9 (8.8)	38.3 (3.5)	29.0 (−1.7)	44.8 (7.1)
Source: PRISM

Climate data for North Cape May, NJ Ocean Water Temperature (19 SW Sea Isle City)
Month	Jan	Feb	Mar	Apr	May	Jun	Jul	Aug	Sep	Oct	Nov	Dec	Year
Daily mean °F (°C)	37 (3)	37 (3)	42 (6)	50 (10)	59 (15)	68 (20)	73 (23)	74 (23)	72 (22)	61 (16)	52 (11)	42 (6)	56 (13)
Source: NOAA

== Ecology ==
According to the A. W. Kuchler U.S. potential natural vegetation types, Sea Isle City would have a dominant vegetation type of Northern Cordgrass (73) with a dominant vegetation form of Coastal Prairie (20).

== Notable people ==
People who were born in, residents of, or otherwise closely associated with Sea Isle City include:

- Richard M. Atwater (1844–1922), chemist and glassmaker, who served as mayor of Sea Isle City from 1913 to 1917
- Jeff Carter (born 1985), professional hockey player for the Pittsburgh Penguins
- Angelo Cataldi (born 1951) is a sports radio personality for 94.1 WIP in Philadelphia
- Steve Corino (born 1973), professional wrestler who works for Ring of Honor
- Alexis Dziena (born 1984), actress
- Joe Flacco (born 1985), quarterback for the Cleveland Browns
- Virginia Davis Floyd (born 1951), physician known for her work in public health, foreign policy and the nonprofit sector.
- Charles Lewis Fussell (1840–1909), landscape artist
- Chris Gheysens (born 1971), president and chief executive officer of Wawa Inc.
- John C. Gibson (born 1934), former member of the New Jersey General Assembly
- Jason Kelce (born 1987), former professional football center who spent his entire 13-year career with the Philadelphia Eagles
- Ann J. Land (1932–2010), member of the Philadelphia City Council from 1980 to 1992
- Charles K. Landis (1833–1900), property developer in South Jersey, who was the founder and developer of Vineland and Sea Isle City
- Josh Mathews (born 1980), play-by-play commentator with WWE and later, Impact Wrestling
- Joseph J. Roberts (born 1952), politician who represented the 5th Legislative District in the New Jersey General Assembly from 1987 to 2010
- John Stevens (born 1966), former defenseman who has coached in the NHL at various levels
- Nolan Stevens (born 1996), professional ice hockey player who currently plays for Leksands IF of the Swedish Hockey League

Preceded by Strathmere	Beaches of New Jersey	Succeeded by Avalon
