= Townsends Inlet =

Coordinates: 39°07′04″N 74°42′52″W

Townsends Inlet is an inlet connecting Townsend Sound with the Atlantic Ocean in Cape May County, New Jersey.

== Geography ==
Townsends Inlet separates Seven Mile Island from Ludlam Island, and including its continuation, Townsend Channel, connects Townsend Sound with the Atlantic Ocean. Ingram Thorofare connects Townsends Inlet with Great Sound; North Channel, South Channel and Middle Thorofare connect to Stites Sound.

Townsends Inlet was described in 1878, viz.,

Townsend's Inlet, less than half a mile wide, and having four feet of water, gives exit to the waters of Townsend's and Stite's Sounds, which lie within. Townsend's Run is a small stream flowing into the latter.

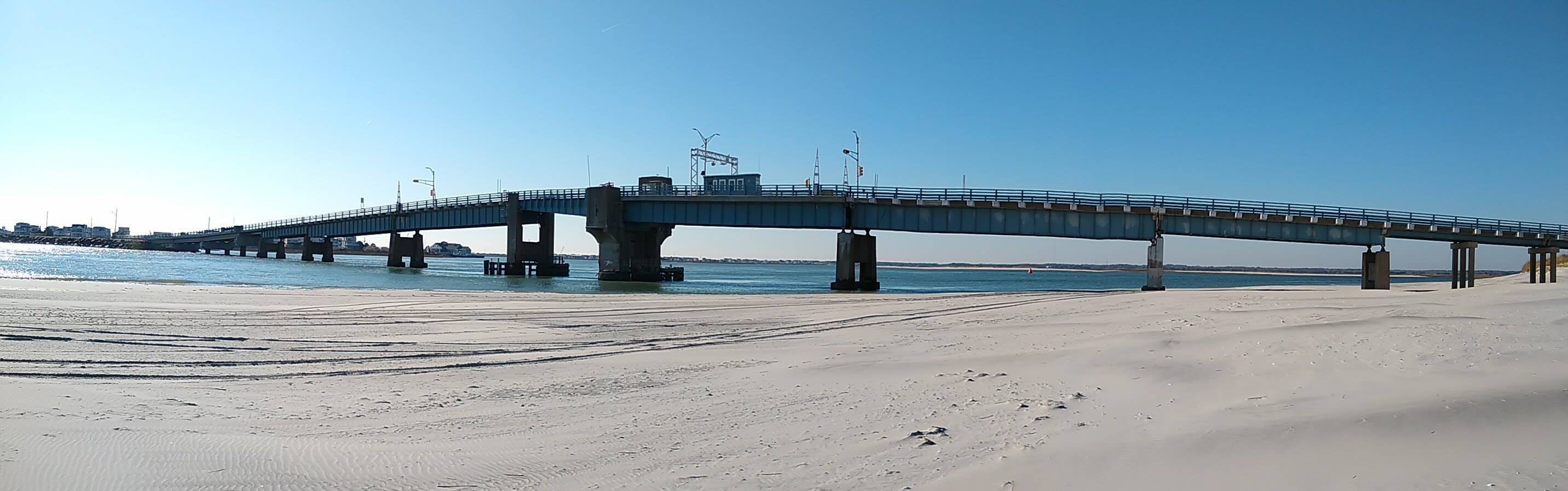
Townsends Inlet Bridge, 2019

== Bridge ==
The Townsends Inlet Bridge is a toll bridge across the inlet, carrying Ocean Drive between Avalon and Sea Isle City. The bridge was built around 1940 and while it has undergone repairs, it is aging and has deteriorated. Plans to replace it are being developed.

== History ==
Townsends Inlet appears as Denises Inlet on a map circa 1700; the present name appears on a map published in 1749 by Lewis Evans.

== See also ==
- Ludlam Island
- Seven Mile Island
