= Ludlam Island =

Barrier island in Cape May County, New Jersey, United States

Coordinates: 39.180161°N 74.673986°W

Ludlam Island is a barrier island in southern New Jersey, on which Sea Isle City and Strathmere, a part of Upper Township, are located.

== Geography ==
Ludlam Island is a barrier island along the Atlantic Ocean between Corson Inlet on the northeast and Townsends Inlet on the southwest. Ludlam Bay, along with an expanse of salt marsh and tidal channels, separates Ludlam Island from the mainland.

Ludlam Island was described in 1834 as

Ludlam's Beach, extends upon the ocean about 6 miles from Carson's to Townsend's Inlet, partly in Middle, and partly in Dennis Township, Cape May County.

An 1878 description of Ludlam Island is as follows, viz.,

Ludlam's Beach between Corson's and Townsend's Inlets, is seven miles long, uninhabited, and is a low, flat, sandy island, having only three or four small clumps of red cedar on it.

A footnote to the 1878 description further elaborates,

The following description of Ludlam's Beach was furnished by Mr. George Dare, of Seaville: "The northeast end of Ludlam's Beach for a distance of three miles has not a bush growing on it. Thirty years ago it was covered with large red cedar trees. In the winter of 1863-64 a furious gale from the northeast washed away a mile of hills and cedar timber. The salt marshes are exposed on the outside of the beach for miles, and here is a reason that the beaches do not wash away faster. The tough turf of the salt marshes has to be broken up; it will not wash away nor blow away."

== History ==
Joseph Ludlam purchased the island in the late 17th century, and grazed cows and sheep on it. In the 1880s, developer Charles K. Landis founded the City of Sea Isle on the island. The original vision that Landis had of Ludlam Island was modeled after Venice's opulent waterways, and his plan for the island included canals and waterways.

Ludlam's Beach Lighthouse was constructed in 1885 and was built after Charles K. Landis requested a light because of several shipwrecks off the island. The light was an L-shaped, two-story, structure with a square light tower on top, located at 31st Street and the Boardwalk until 1924. In 1923, a fire was started when the keeper's dog knocked over a kerosene lantern, destroying the roof and the light.
