= Pecks Beach =

Barrier island in New Jersey, United States

Coordinates: 39°14′47″N 74°36′44″W

Pecks Beach or Peck's Beach is a barrier island located on the Jersey Shore in Cape May County, New Jersey occupied by Ocean City.

== Geography ==
The island of Pecks Beach lies along shore of New Jersey on the Atlantic Ocean between Great Egg Harbor Inlet on the northeast, and Corson Inlet on the southwest. It was described in 1834 as,

Peck's Beach on the coast of the Atlantic ocean, in Upper t-ship, Cape May co., extends about ten miles, from Corson's to Egg Harbour inlet.

An 1878 description follows, viz.,

Peck's Beach lies south from Great Egg Harbor, is about eight miles long, and is wooded with red cedar, wild cherry, and some other timber. Behind this beach lies Peck's Bay, an arm of Great Egg Harbor Bay.

Ocean City occupies the entirety of Pecks Beach, along with some adjacent uninhabited islands.
