= Corson Inlet =

Strait on the coast of New Jersey, United States

Coordinates: 39°12′20″N 74°38′57″W

Corson Inlet is a narrow strait on the southern coast of New Jersey in the United States.

Corson Inlet leads from the Atlantic Ocean through barrier islands off the northeast coast of Cape May County, New Jersey. The Inlet separates Ocean City, New Jersey, from Strathmere, New Jersey.

The United States Navy seaplane tender USS Corson, in commission from 1944 to 1946 and 1951 to 1956, was named for Corson Inlet.

Corson's Inlet State Park borders the strait.

The inlet and adjacent dunes were a favorite place for the amblings of American poet A.R. Ammons, resulting in one of his best known poems, "Corsons Inlet".

Automobile traffic leading to Corson Inlet has created evenly spaced road depressions, measuring approximately 3 feet in height and depth.

== Geography ==
Corson Inlet separates Pecks Beach from Ludlam Island in Cape May County.

It was described in 1834 as,

Corson's Inlet, a passage of the sea, through the beach, to the lagunes and marshes of Upper t-ship, Cape May co., about half a mile in width.

Corson Inlet was described in 1878, viz.,

Corson's Inlet connects Corson's Sound and Ludlam's Bay with the ocean. It is upwards of half a mile wide, and is navigable for small-sized vessels; it has seven feet of water on its bar.

== History ==
Corson Inlet appears as Bottle Inlet on a map circa 1700; and as "Coston's Inlet" on a map published in 1749 by Lewis Evans.
