= Great Egg Harbor Inlet =

- Location: Counties of Atlantic and Cape May in New Jersey
- Coordinates: 39°17′59″N 74°32′44″W
- Type: Inlet

Great Egg Harbor Inlet is an inlet connecting Great Egg Harbor Bay with the Atlantic Ocean in New Jersey, forming a part of the boundary between Atlantic and Cape May Counties.

== Geography ==
Great Egg Harbor Inlet separates Absecon Island from Pecks Beach, and connects Great Egg Harbor Bay with the Atlantic Ocean.

Great Egg Harbor Inlet was described in 1878, viz.,

Great Egg Harbor Inlet is a considerable channel leading into Great Egg Harbor Bay, and is the outlet for the waters of Great Egg Harbor and Tuckahoe Rivers and the streams that flow into them. It is about a mile wide, and has seven feet water on its bar at low water. Vessels of considerable size can enter here, and quite a commerce is carried on out of this inlet from the towns on the rivers that flow into the bay; formerly much more than at present. The Bay and Tuckahoe River constitute the division line between Atlantic and Cape May Counties.

== See also ==
- Absecon Island
- Pecks Beach
