= Strathmere, New Jersey =

Populated place in Cape May County, New Jersey, US

- Census-designated place
- Map of Strathmere highlighted within Cape May County. Right: Location of Cape May County in New Jersey.

- Location in Cape May County Location in New Jersey Location in the United States
- Coordinates: 39.19614°N 74.659412°W
- Country: United States
- State: New Jersey
- County: Cape May
- Township: Upper

Area
  - Total: 0.76 sq mi (1.96 km^{2})
  - Land: 0.53 sq mi (1.36 km^{2})
  - Water: 0.23 sq mi (0.60 km^{2}) 21.29%
- Elevation: 3.3 ft (1 m)

Population (2020)
  - Total: 137
  - Density: 258.5/sq mi (99.8/km^{2})
- Time zone: UTC−05:00 (Eastern (EST))
  - Summer (DST): UTC−04:00 (Eastern (EDT))
- ZIP Code: 08248
- Area code: 609
- FIPS code: 34-71250
- GNIS feature ID: 02390365

Strathmere is an unincorporated community and census-designated place (CDP) located within Upper Township in Cape May County, in the U.S. state of New Jersey. As of the 2020 United States census, the CDP's population was 137, a decrease of 21 (−13.3%) from the 158 counted at the 2010 U.S. census, which reflected a decrease of 17 (−9.7%) from the 175 enumerated at the 2000 census.

With its beaches in the Strathmere section, Upper Township is one of five municipalities in the state that offer free public access to oceanfront beaches monitored by lifeguards, joining Atlantic City, North Wildwood, Wildwood, and Wildwood Crest.

== History ==
The earliest known people on Ludlam Island (where Strathmere is located) were the Lenape Native Americans, who came to the island in the summertime to hunt fish and crustaceans. Along the northern 1.5 mi (2.4 km) portion of the island was a community named Corson's Inlet, after the waterway separating the island and Ocean City to the north. A part of Upper Township and Dennis Township became a part of neighboring Sea Isle City in 1905, also on Ludlam Island. That same year, Sea Isle City sold Corson's Inlet to Upper Township for $31,500 (equivalent to $1,130,000 in 2025) to pay off municipal debt. In 1912, the community of Corson's Inlet was renamed Strathmere.

The Whale Beach section of Strathmere got its name from the whales that would periodically beach themselves there.

In 2007, Citizens for Strathmere and Whale Beach petitioned to leave Upper Township and join neighboring Sea Isle City, citing an unfair tax burden, inadequate municipal services, and a lengthy wait time for the police. The local planning board held 18 meetings over the next two years, and the township recommended against de-annexation in 2009, noting that taxes would increase school taxes by 20% for the remainder of Upper Township. The group in favor of de-annexation filed a suit with the New Jersey Superior Court, which ruled against the petition in 2010. An appeal to the New Jersey Supreme Court was denied in January 2013.

== Geography ==
According to the United States Census Bureau, the CDP had a total area of 0.760 square miles (1.97 km^{2}), including 0.598 square miles (1.55 km^{2}) of land and 0.162 square miles (0.42 km^{2}) of water (21.29%).

== Demographics ==
Historical population
Census	Pop.	Note	%±
2000	175		—
2010	158		−9.7%
2020	137		−13.3%
Population sources: 1950 1960 1970; 1980 1990 2000; 2010 2020

Strathmere first appeared as a census designated place in the 2000 U.S. census.

=== 2020 census ===
Strathmere CDP, New Jersey – Racial and ethnic composition Note: the US Census treats Hispanic/Latino as an ethnic category. This table excludes Latinos from the racial categories and assigns them to a separate category. Hispanics/Latinos may be of any race.
Race / Ethnicity (NH = Non-Hispanic)	Pop 2000	Pop 2010	Pop 2020	% 2000	% 2010	% 2020
White alone (NH)	170	156	131	97.14%	98.73%	95.62%
Black or African American alone (NH)	0	0	1	0.00%	0.00%	0.73%
Native American or Alaska Native alone (NH)	0	0	0	0.00%	0.00%	0.00%
Asian alone (NH)	2	0	2	1.14%	0.00%	1.46%
Native Hawaiian or Pacific Islander alone (NH)	0	0	0	0.00%	0.00%	0.00%
Other race alone (NH)	0	0	0	0.00%	0.00%	0.00%
Mixed race or Multiracial (NH)	0	1	0	0.00%	0.63%	0.00%
Hispanic or Latino (any race)	3	1	3	1.71%	0.63%	2.19%
Total	175	158	137	100.00%	100.00%	100.00%

=== 2010 census ===
The 2010 United States census counted 158 people, 82 households, and 49 families in the CDP. The population density was 264.2 people per square mile (102.0 people/km^{2}). There were 447 housing units at an average density of 747.5 units per square mile (288.6 units/km^{2}). The racial makeup was 98.73% (156) White, 0.00% (0) Black or African American, 0.00% (0) Native American, 0.00% (0) Asian, 0.63% (1) Pacific Islander, 0.00% (0) from other races, and 0.63% (1) from two or more races. Hispanic or Latino of any race were 0.63% (1) of the population.

Of the 82 households, 9.8% had children under the age of 18; 52.4% were married couples living together; 4.9% had a female householder with no husband present and 40.2% were non-families. Of all households, 36.6% were made up of individuals and 20.7% had someone living alone who was 65 years of age or older. The average household size was 1.93 and the average family size was 2.49.

8.9% of the population were under the age of 18, 4.4% from 18 to 24, 10.1% from 25 to 44, 42.4% from 45 to 64, and 34.2% who were 65 years of age or older. The median age was 57.9 years. For every 100 females, the population had 102.6 males. For every 100 females ages 18 and older there were 108.7 males.

=== 2000 census ===
As of the 2000 United States census there were 175 people, 93 households, and 54 families residing in the CDP. The population density was 104.0 people/km^{2} (269 people/mi^{2}). There were 464 housing units at an average density of 275.6 units/km^{2} (714 units/mi^{2}). The racial makeup of the CDP was 97.71% White, 1.14% Asian, and 1.14% from two or more races. Hispanic or Latino of any race were 1.71% of the population.

Of the 93 households; 7.5% had children under the age of 18 living with them, 49.5% were married couples living together, 5.4% had a female householder with no husband present, and 40.9% were non-families. 38.7% of all households were made up of individuals, and 12.9% had someone living alone who was 65 years of age or older. The average household size was 1.88 and the average family size was 2.44.

In the CDP the population was spread out, with 8.0% under the age of 18, 4.0% from 18 to 24, 17.1% from 25 to 44, 36.6% from 45 to 64, and 34.3% who were 65 years of age or older. The median age was 58 years. For every 100 females, there were 96.6 males. For every 100 females age 18 and over, there were 96.3 males.

The median income for a household in the CDP was $78,709, and the median income for a family was $77,783. Males had a median income of $40,972 versus $43,750 for females. The per capita income for the CDP was $52,045. None of the population or families were below the poverty line.

== Climate ==
According to the Köppen climate classification system, Strathmere has a humid subtropical climate (Cfa) with hot, moderately humid summers, cool winters and year-around precipitation. Cfa climates are characterized by all months having an average mean temperature above 32.0 °F (0.0 °C), at least four months with an average mean temperature at or above 50.0 °F (10.0 °C), at least one month with an average mean temperature at or above 71.6 °F (22.0 °C) and no significant precipitation difference between seasons. During the summer months in Strathmere, a cooling afternoon sea breeze is present on most days, but episodes of extreme heat and humidity can occur with heat index values at or above 95.0 °F (35.0 °C). During the winter months, episodes of extreme cold and wind can occur with wind chill values below 0.0 °F (−17.8 °C). The plant hardiness zone at Strathmere Beach is 7b with an average annual extreme minimum air temperature of 5.0 °F (−15.0 °C). The average seasonal (November–April) snowfall total is between 12 and 18 inches (30 and 46 cm) and the average snowiest month is February which corresponds with the annual peak in nor'easter activity.

Climate data for Strathmere Beach, NJ (1981–2010 Averages)
Month	Jan	Feb	Mar	Apr	May	Jun	Jul	Aug	Sep	Oct	Nov	Dec	Year
Mean daily maximum °F (°C)	41.7 (5.4)	43.9 (6.6)	51.0 (10.6)	60.6 (15.9)	69.9 (21.1)	78.7 (25.9)	83.5 (28.6)	82.3 (27.9)	76.6 (24.8)	65.9 (18.8)	56.5 (13.6)	46.5 (8.1)	63.2 (17.3)
Daily mean °F (°C)	33.8 (1.0)	35.9 (2.2)	42.4 (5.8)	51.9 (11.1)	61.1 (16.2)	70.3 (21.3)	75.5 (24.2)	74.4 (23.6)	68.1 (20.1)	57.2 (14.0)	48.0 (8.9)	38.5 (3.6)	54.8 (12.7)
Mean daily minimum °F (°C)	26.0 (−3.3)	27.9 (−2.3)	33.9 (1.1)	43.1 (6.2)	52.3 (11.3)	61.9 (16.6)	67.5 (19.7)	66.5 (19.2)	59.7 (15.4)	48.5 (9.2)	39.4 (4.1)	30.5 (−0.8)	46.5 (8.1)
Average precipitation inches (mm)	3.33 (85)	2.89 (73)	4.26 (108)	3.70 (94)	3.46 (88)	3.17 (81)	3.74 (95)	4.27 (108)	3.40 (86)	3.65 (93)	3.36 (85)	3.75 (95)	42.98 (1,092)
Average relative humidity (%)	67.3	65.6	62.8	62.5	67.1	71.1	71.1	73.6	72.2	71.0	68.7	68.1	68.4
Average dew point °F (°C)	24.1 (−4.4)	25.5 (−3.6)	30.6 (−0.8)	39.5 (4.2)	50.1 (10.1)	60.5 (15.8)	65.5 (18.6)	65.4 (18.6)	58.8 (14.9)	47.9 (8.8)	38.2 (3.4)	28.9 (−1.7)	44.7 (7.1)
Source: PRISM

Climate data for Atlantic City, NJ Ocean Water Temperature (17 NE Strathmere)
Month	Jan	Feb	Mar	Apr	May	Jun	Jul	Aug	Sep	Oct	Nov	Dec	Year
Daily mean °F (°C)	37 (3)	35 (2)	42 (6)	48 (9)	56 (13)	63 (17)	70 (21)	73 (23)	70 (21)	61 (16)	53 (12)	44 (7)	54 (12)
Source: NOAA

== Ecology ==
According to the A. W. Kuchler U.S. potential natural vegetation types, Strathmere would have a dominant vegetation type of Northern Cordgrass (73) with a dominant vegetation form of Coastal Prairie (20).

== Education ==
As with other parts of Upper Township, the area is zoned to Upper Township School District (for grades K-8) and Ocean City School District (for high school). The latter operates Ocean City High School.

Countywide schools include Cape May County Technical High School and Cape May County Special Services School District.

Preceded by Ocean City	Beaches of New Jersey	Succeeded by Sea Isle City
