= Vineland Historical and Antiquarian Society =

The Vineland Historical and Antiquarian Society is the oldest local historical society in New Jersey. Its primary mission is to collect and preserve artifacts and records related to Vineland, New Jersey, the South Jersey region, and American history, and share that material with the public through exhibits, programs and other appropriate venues.

== History ==
Founded in 1864, three years after the creation of the town of Vineland, the society has been dedicated to preserving both local and regional history. The society's museum is the oldest purpose-built museum in the state. It opened to the public in 1910 at the corner of Seventh and Elmer Streets, just one block south of downtown Vineland. The museum features permanent exhibits of antique furnishings, paintings, military artifacts, broadsides, and musical instruments. There are rooms dedicated to the Civil War, the history of local Native American cultures, and glass making. The Charles K. Landis room features many furnishings and personal items that once belonged to the town founder. The Society also maintains an archives at the museum, which includes photographs, local newspapers and South Jersey census records, as well as a library of general history and biographical works.

The Vineland Historical and Antiquarian Society celebrated its 150th anniversary in 2014.

== Collections ==
- The Civil War Room
- The Glass Room
- Native American Collection
- Charles K. Landis Room, Founder of Vineland, N.J.
- The Great Hall, exhibits
- Art, Portraits, Glass, artifacts

== Persons of note ==
- Charles K. Landis
- Frank D. Andrews
- Victor Durand Jr.
- Mary Treat
- Mary Tillotson
- Thomas Bramwell Welch, Creator of Welch's Grape Juice
- Walter Lewis Shaw, telecommunications inventor
- Capt. Inman Sealby, Captain of the RMS Republic

== See also ==
- List of historical societies in New Jersey
