= John Gage (19th-century landowner) =

American business and landowner (1802–1890)

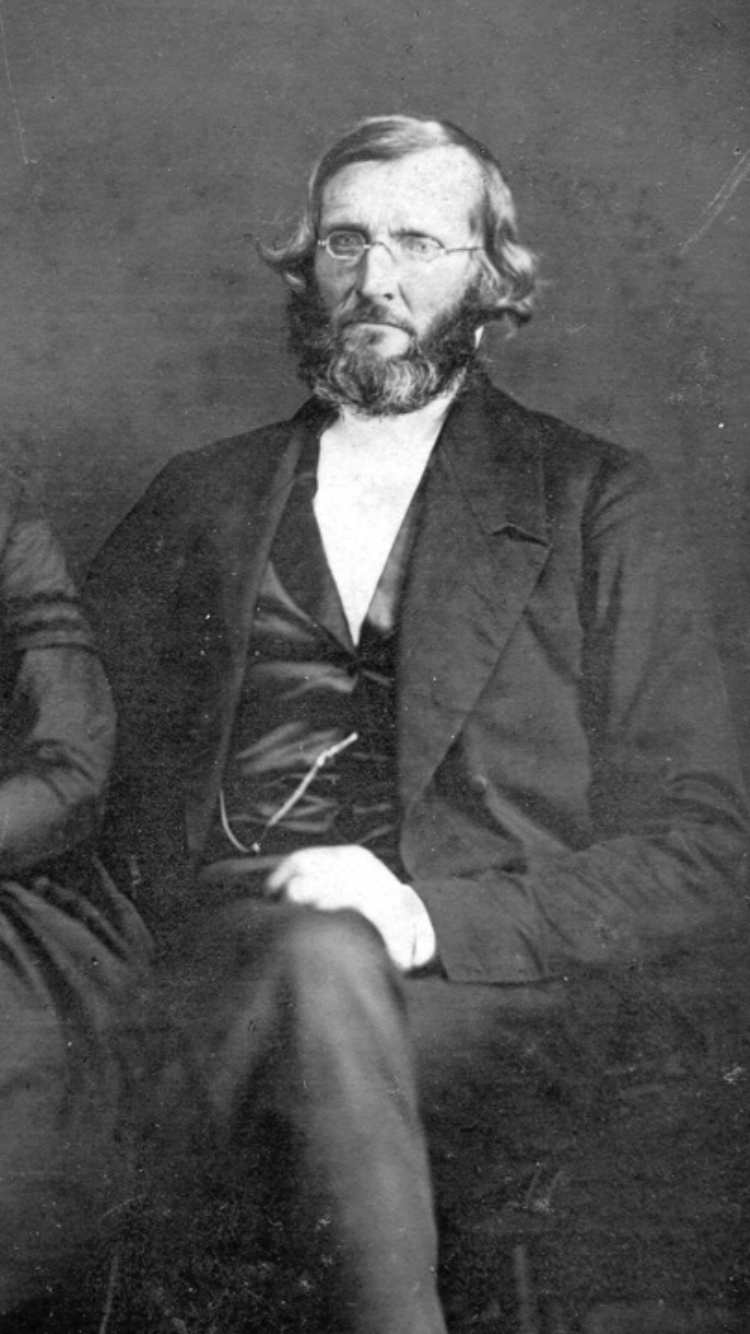

Personal details
- Born: August 12, 1802 Litchfield, New York, U.S.
- Died: December 29, 1890 (aged 88) Vineland, New Jersey, U.S.
- Resting place: Siloam Cemetery, Vineland, New Jersey

John Gage (August 12, 1802 – December 29, 1890) was an American businessman and landowner from the state of New York. He would live in Cook County, Illinois for 10 years. The census-designated place of Gages Lake in Warren Township is named after him and his brother George Gage. He was the husband of New Jersey Woman Suffrage Movement organizer Portia Kellogg Gage.

== Biography ==
John was born to James Gage and Polly Drury Gage on August 12, 1802, in Litchfield, Herkimer County, New York. On October 4th, 1830 he married American activist and suffragist Portia Kellogg in Watertown, New York. Both were known to be strong supporters of racial, gender, and religious equality.

John and Portia moved to Chicago in 1836, and with an estimated population of about 3,000, import prices were high and flour was nearly 18 dollars a barrel. When John opened his flour mill in Wilmette in 1839, the price dropped to five dollars a barrel. (Equivalent to $630->$175 in 2026) Though economically sound, it is said that the time spent in Chicago was very difficult for the couple as they had four children and only one was said to have survived past infancy. After much concern on the cleanliness of the city, John sold his portion of the flour mill to his brother Jared Gage in 1846. Soon after the couple moved to the area now known as Gages Lake. There they would have eleven more children with only five making it to adulthood.

On May 27, 1857 John purchased "136.73 acres of Wilmette land, north of Elmwood Avenue, including where Plaza del Lago now stands, from the widow Mary Dennis for $13,173." Though, after searching for warmer weather the couple decided to move to and settle in Vineland, New Jersey in 1864. The family would make large donations to the County and the village of Wilmette for many years. Their children and grandchildren would handle their real estate after their move. Mainly their second son and Civil War veteran Henry H. Gage until his passing in 1911.

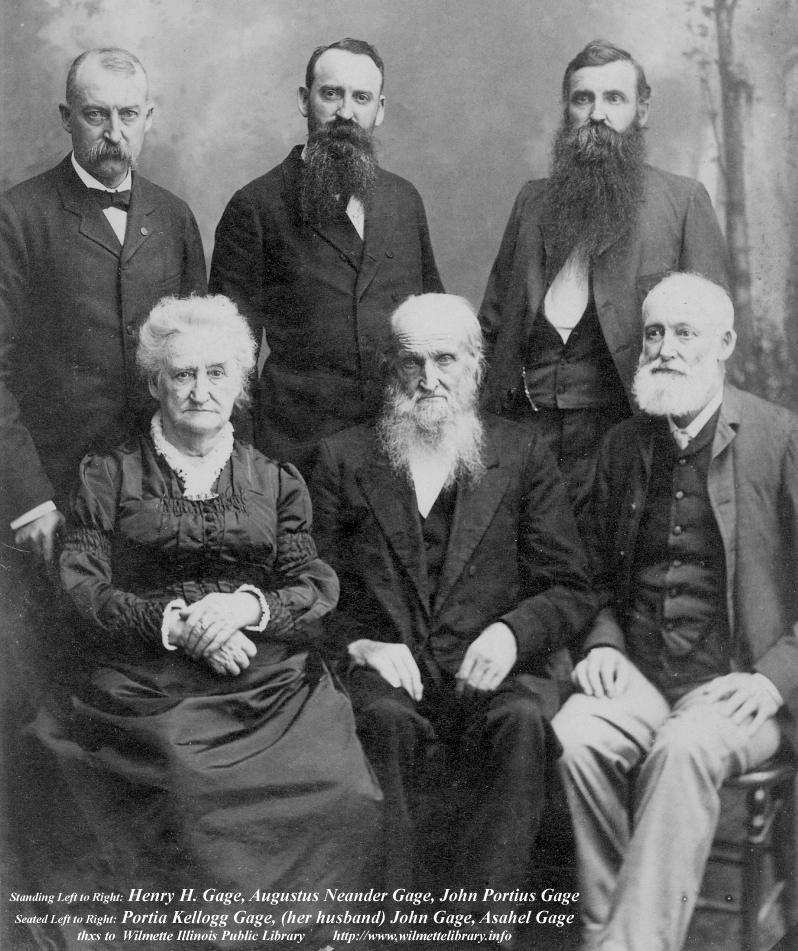
Gage Family and sons. Circa: 1890

John died in Vineland on December 29, 1890 at 88 years old. His wife Portia would return to Wilmette until her death on February 23, 1903, aged 89. They were both laid to rest in Siloam Cemetery with John's ashes being placed in Portia's casket prior to her burial.
