= Charles Landis =

Charles Landis is the name of:

- Charles B. Landis, politician
- Charles K. Landis, land developer and acquitted murderer
