= Charles K. Landis =

American property developer

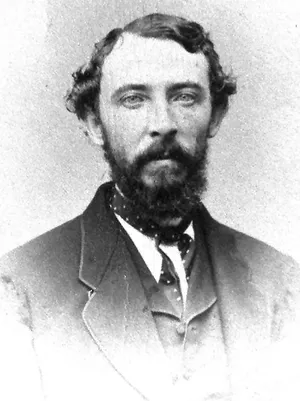

Personal details
- Born: March 16, 1833 Philadelphia, Pennsylvania, U.S.
- Died: June 12, 1900 Vineland, New Jersey, U.S.
- Resting place: Siloam Cemetery, Vineland, New Jersey

Charles Kline Landis (March 16, 1833 – June 12, 1900) was a property developer in South Jersey, who was the founder and developer of Vineland and Sea Isle City.

== Career ==
His first foray as a developer began with the development of the tiny town of Colville in the 1850s, which is known today as Elwood. After that venture failed, Landis became partners with a Philadelphia banker named Richard Byrnes, and began to develop the town of Hammonton. They purchased 5,000 acres (20 km^{2}) of land along the Camden and Atlantic Railroad, connecting Camden and Atlantic City. By 1860, Hammonton had over 2,000 inhabitants, and was a successful agricultural community.

When they began to disagree over the future of Hammonton, Landis decided to sell his share of their real estate business to Byrnes and moved on to develop the town that would eventually become known as Vineland. He purchased 20,000 acres (81 km^{2}) of land in 1861, near Millville, New Jersey, and along an existing railroad line with service to Philadelphia. The first houses were built in 1862, and train service was established to Philadelphia and New York City, with the population reaching 5,500 by 1865.

In addition to banning the sale of alcohol, Landis required that purchasers of land in Vineland had to build a house on the purchased property within a year of purchase, that 2½ acres of the often-heavily wooded land had to be cleared and farmed each year, and that adequate space be placed between houses and roads to allow for planting of flowers and shade trees along the routes through town. Landis Avenue was constructed as a 100-foot (30 m) wide and about 1-mile (2 km) long road running east–west through the center of the community, with other, narrower roads connecting at right angles to each other. The actual town was only one mile square, running from Park Avenue to Chestnut Avenue, and from East Avenue to West Avenue. The surrounding area, which was primarily agricultural, was called Landis Township.

After determining that the Vineland soil was well-suited for growing grapes (where he got the name), Landis started advertising to attract Italian grape growers to Vineland, offering 20 acres (81,000 m^{2}) of land that had to be cleared and used to grow grapes. Thomas Bramwell Welch founded Welch's Grape Juice, and purchased the locally grown grapes to make "unfermented wine" (or grape juice).

In 1880, Landis purchased Ludlam Island, a barrier island on the Atlantic Ocean shorefront, with the intention of building a city like Venice, Italy, to include canals, fountains and other public art. While the Venice aspect of the project was less than successful, his Sea Isle City Improvement Company brought residents to the area, which separated from Dennis Township, and was incorporated as Sea Isle City, New Jersey, on May 22, 1882, based on the results of a referendum held six days earlier. The main street today is called Landis Avenue.

Landis also had a hand in establishing other small towns, including Landisville. He planned to make it county seat of a new county called Landis County, which would incorporate land from the surrounding counties. However, the locals were against this, and began calling him "King Landis". Landisville has never eclipsed Vineland in importance.

== Uri Carruth trial ==
After articles were published in the Vineland Independent questioning the sanity of Landis' wife, Landis calmly walked into the office and shot Uri Carruth, the paper's editor, in the back of the head. Carruth lingered for months, but when he died Landis was charged with murder. Landis was found not guilty based on temporary insanity in a sensational 1875 trial. This may have been the first time in American judicial history where a person claimed insanity as a reason for being not guilty.

Carruth had moved from Wisconsin to Vineland after reading of Vineland's "healthful climate" in one of Landis' promotional advertisements for the city, but later came to create a rival newspaper to Landis'.

== Personal life ==
Landis was born in Philadelphia to Michael G. and Mary L. Landis and was educated as a lawyer. Charles Landis died on June 12, 1900, at the age of 67 and is buried in Siloam Cemetery in Vineland, a cemetery that was established on land donated by him in 1864. A collection of Charles Landis possessions can be viewed at the Vineland Historical Society.
