= Jeremiah Hacker =

American missionary and journalist

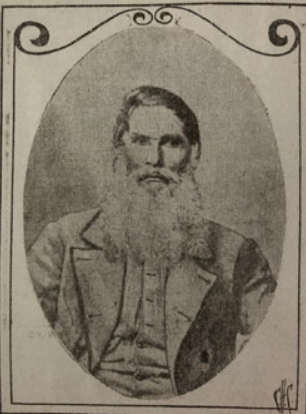
- Born: 1801; Brunswick, Maine, US
- Died: August 27, 1895 (aged 94); Vineland, New Jersey, US
- Burial place: Siloam Cemetery
- Occupations: Missionary, journalist

Jeremiah Hacker (1801 – August 27, 1895) was a missionary, reformer, vegetarian, and journalist who wrote and published The Pleasure Boat and The Chariot of Wisdom and Love in Portland, Maine, from 1845 to 1866.

== Biography ==
Born in Brunswick, Maine, to a large Quaker family, Hacker moved to Portland as a young adult. He lost his hearing, and used an ear trumpet. He married Submit Tobey, known as Mittie, in 1846. He was a Portland newspaper publisher for two decades. He was strikingly tall with a big, bushy beard. After the Great Fire of 1866, Hacker left Portland and retired to a life of farming in Vineland, New Jersey, where he continued to write, sending letters and poems in to Anarchist and Free thought newspapers until his death in 1895.

In Portland, he worked as a penmanship instructor, a teacher, and a shopkeeper. Eventually he sold his shop in 1841 and took to the road as an itinerant preacher during the Second Great Awakening. He traveled through Maine, telling people to leave their churches and seek their inner light or "that of God within."

Returning to Portland in 1845, Hacker began writing and printing a reform journal called The Pleasure Boat. According to Hacker himself, he sold his one good coat to pay for the newspaper's first edition. He wore a borrowed coat after that, which he referred to for years as "the old drab coat." He wrote his newspaper on his knee and lived in a boarding house in near-poverty, while he spent all his time getting his message out.

He became known as an outspoken journalist who railed against organized religion, government, prisons, slavery, land monopoly, and warfare. He was a proponent of abolition, women's rights, temperance, and vegetarianism. He was an early proponent of anarchism, and free thought, he was also a prison reformer. Unhappy with how juvenile offenders were treated in the adult prisons, Hacker was influential in building public support for a Maine reform school which became the third in the country, after Philadelphia and Boston. Because of the culture of reform that existed in 19th-century New England, The Pleasure Boat enjoyed wide circulation until the approach of the American Civil War. On the brink of a war that many fellow reformers thought was unavoidable and morally justifiable, Hacker advocated pacifism, and lost so many readers his newspaper foundered. By 1864, he started another newspaper entitled The Chariot of Wisdom and Love. The paper came to an end after the Great Fire destroyed much of Portland on July 4, 1866. Soon after this event Hacker left the city to retire in Vineland, New Jersey.

Hacker has been described as "Maine’s original alt-journalist". He was known for criticizing quack doctors selling fake miracle cures.

Hacker was a vegetarian who championed animal rights, environmentalism and vegetarianism in his Pleasure Boat newspaper. In the July 20, 1854 issue of the Pleasure Boat, Hacker commented: "It has been proved that those who live on vegetable food, bread, fruits, &c., are healthier, can perform more labor, endure more heat and cold, and live to a greater age, than flesh eaters."

Hacker was a supporter of temperance but not of total alcohol prohibition. He did criticize the prohibition group the Martha Washingtons in 1845 when the group did organize a Christmas dinner at Exchange Hall in Portland that served "hogs and oxen." Hacker wrote: “Animal food begets an unnatural thirst, which requires unnatural drink, and has been one of the greatest causes of drunkenness in this nation.”

== Death and influence ==
Hacker died on August 27, 1895, in Vineland, New Jersey, at age 94. He is buried in the Siloam Cemetery.

Historian William Barry said: "In his time, Hacker, who was born in Brunswick was – if not famous – strangely influential." Journalist Liz Graves of The Ellsworth American said: "his ideas about a society ordered by individual morals rather than government and laws closely mirror those of international anarchist Emma Goldman and others a few decades later." Journalist Avery Yale Kamila of the Portland Press Herald said: "All these years later, the Pleasure Boat reads like a roadmap to many issues that were to gain traction in the coming years." Authors Karen and Michael Iacobbo in their book Vegetarian America: A History have said that Hacker "helped cultivate" the vegetarian movement.

== Bibliography ==
- Pritchard, Rebecca M. (2006). The Life and Times of Jeremiah Hacker, 1801-1895. University of Southern Maine.
- Pritchard, Rebecca M. (2019). Jeremiah Hacker: Journalist, Anarchist, Abolitionist. Frayed Edge Press. ISBN 978-1-64251-006-5.
