= 96th Illinois Infantry Regiment =

96th Regiment Illinois Volunteer Infantry
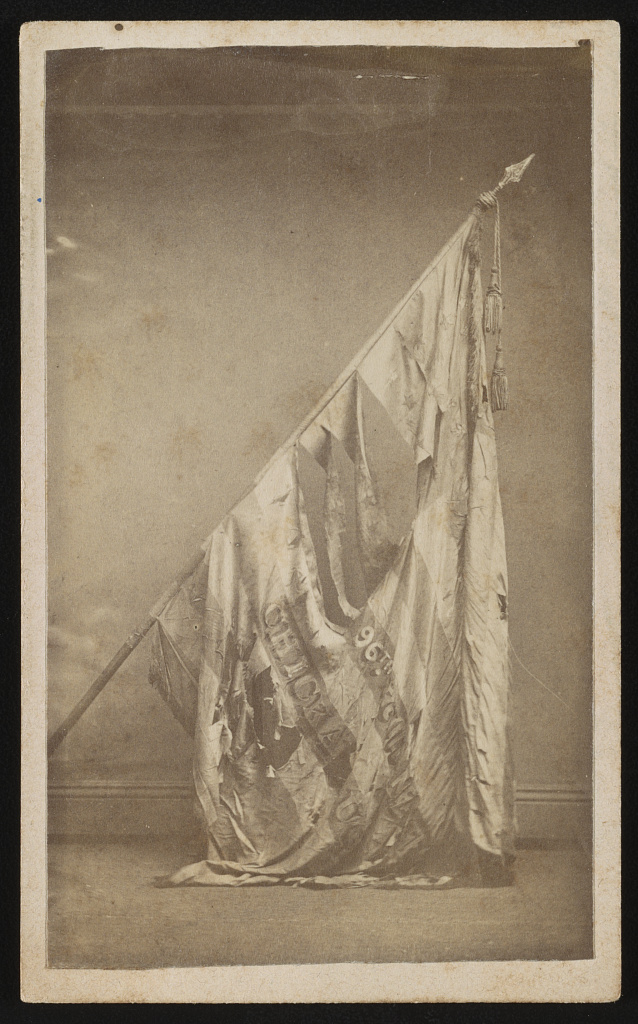
- Carte de visite, J.H. & C.E. Porter, Waukegan, IL
- Active: September 6, 1862 to June 10, 1865
- Country: United States
- Allegiance: Union
- Branch: Infantry
- Equipment: Battle of Chickamauga; Battle of Lookout Mountain; Battle of Missionary Ridge; Battle of Resaca; Battle of Kennesaw Mountain; Battle of Jonesboro; Battle of Franklin; Battle of Nashville

The 96th Regiment Illinois Volunteer Infantry was an infantry regiment that served in the Union Army during the American Civil War.

== Service ==
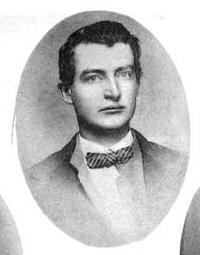
Cpl. Henry H. Gage of Co. G, son of John and Portia Gage. From the 1887 publication History of the Ninety-sixth Regiment: Illinois Volunteer Infantry.

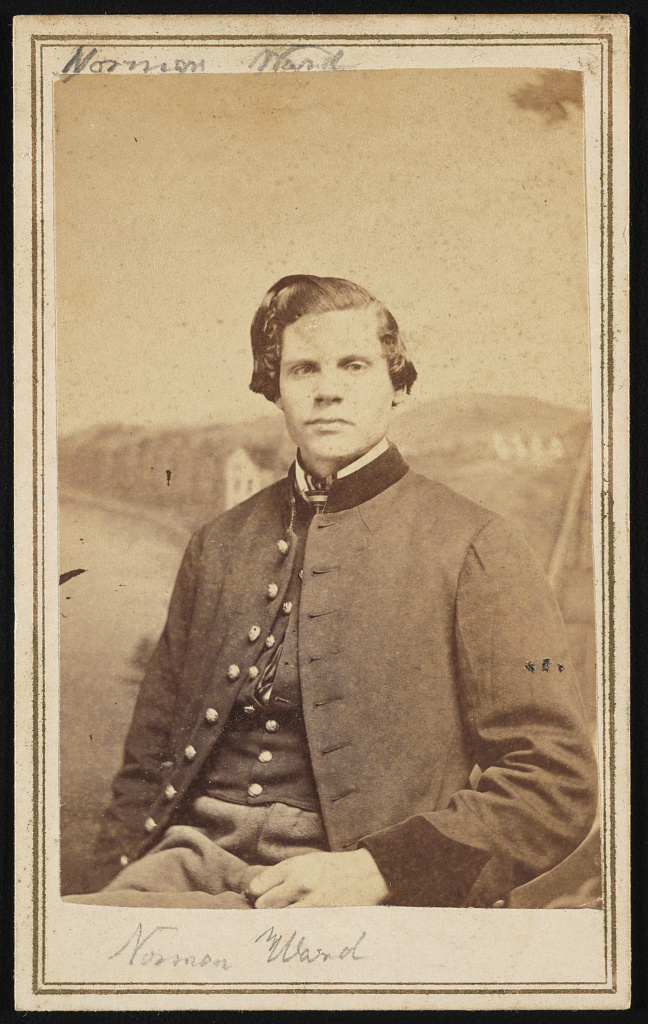
Pvt. Norman P. Ward of Co. H, F. W. Ingmire, Springfield, IL

The 96th Illinois Infantry was organized at Rockford, Illinois, and mustered into Federal service on September 6, 1862. It consisted of men from Jo Daviess County and Lake County, Illinois. The composition of the companies was drawn from a hat with Companies, A, E, F, H, I, and K going to Jo Daviess with B, C, D, and G filled by Lake County men. The original officers were Colonel Thomas E. Champion of Warren, Illinois, and Lieutenant Colonel Issac L. Clarke of Waukegan, Illinois.

The regiment was mustered out on June 10, 1865.

== Total strength and casualties ==
The regiment suffered 5 officers and 111 enlisted men who were killed in action or who died of their wounds and 1 officer and 124 enlisted men who died of disease, for a total of 241 fatalities.

== Commanders ==
- Colonel Thomas E. Champion - Mustered out with the regiment.
- Lieutenant Colonel John C. Smith – brevet brigadier general
- Sargent / Captain Wallace William Abbey - Quartermaster, Company K from Warren, Jo Davis County, Illinois. Later accepted a promotion to Captain. Mustered out of company K.
- First Sergeant Aaron Scott - Company G from Waukegan, Lake County, Illinois. Injured at the Battle of Chickamauga and the Battle of Dallas, was later killed during the Atlanta campaign on 2 Apr. 1864.

== Records ==
The Bess Bower Dunn Museum in Libertyville, Illinois, maintains many records associated with the regiment at their Lake County History Archives. Their records collection focuses on Company B, and includes letters and photographs from the Young and Minto families.

== See also ==
- List of Illinois Civil War Units
- Illinois in the American Civil War
