= Montclair History Center =

Historic society in Montclair, New Jersey, US

Coordinates: 40.81187°N 74.22297°W

The Montclair History Center (formerly known as the Montclair Historical Society), located in Montclair, New Jersey consists of a campus at 108–110 Orange Road, Montclair, New Jersey 07042 with three historic buildings. The first building is the Crane House and Historic YWCA, a Federal Revival style home dating from 1796. The Montclair History Center, originally named the Montclair Historical Society when it was founded in 1965, was renamed in 2014 to reflect its mission which is to fully preserve, educate and share the diverse history of the Israel Crane House and Historic YWCA, as well as the Montclair community. The Israel Crane House, which was built in 1796, was moved to its present site from its original location near Lackawanna Plaza in downtown Montclair in 1965. This site also includes the Nathaniel Crane built by a relative of Israel Crane in 1818 and the Clark House, a Queen Anne style home built in 1894, which contains the administrative offices of the Montclair History Center.

== The Israel Crane House ==
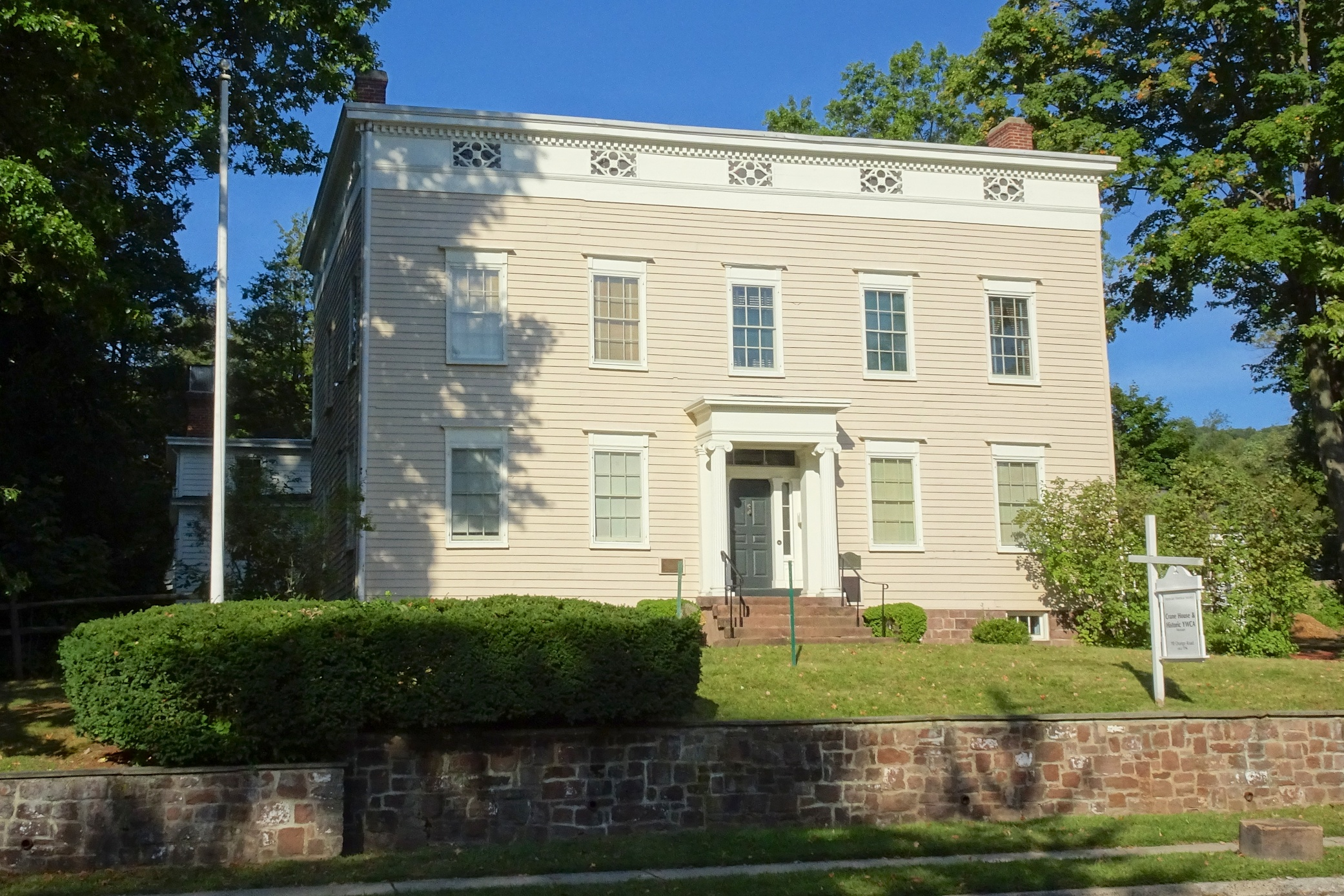
Israel Crane House

The Crane House was built by Israel Crane in 1796 on Old Road (now Glen Ridge Avenue) in Cranetown, which is now the southern part of the Township of Montclair. The home consist of four floors: a basement, first floor, second floor, and attic as well as a kitchen hearth.

The house stayed in the Crane family until 1920, when it was purchased by the YWCA. The house was used for offices, dormitories and as a social center for Black women and girls for 45 years. In 1965, the house faced the prospect of demolition. Local residents committed to its preservation organized and the house was moved from Old Road to 110 Orange Road, its current address. The Crane House and Historic YWCA is one of the few remaining federal mansions in northern New Jersey. It currently operates as the Crane House and Historic YWCA, which is open to the public.

== The Nathaniel Crane House ==
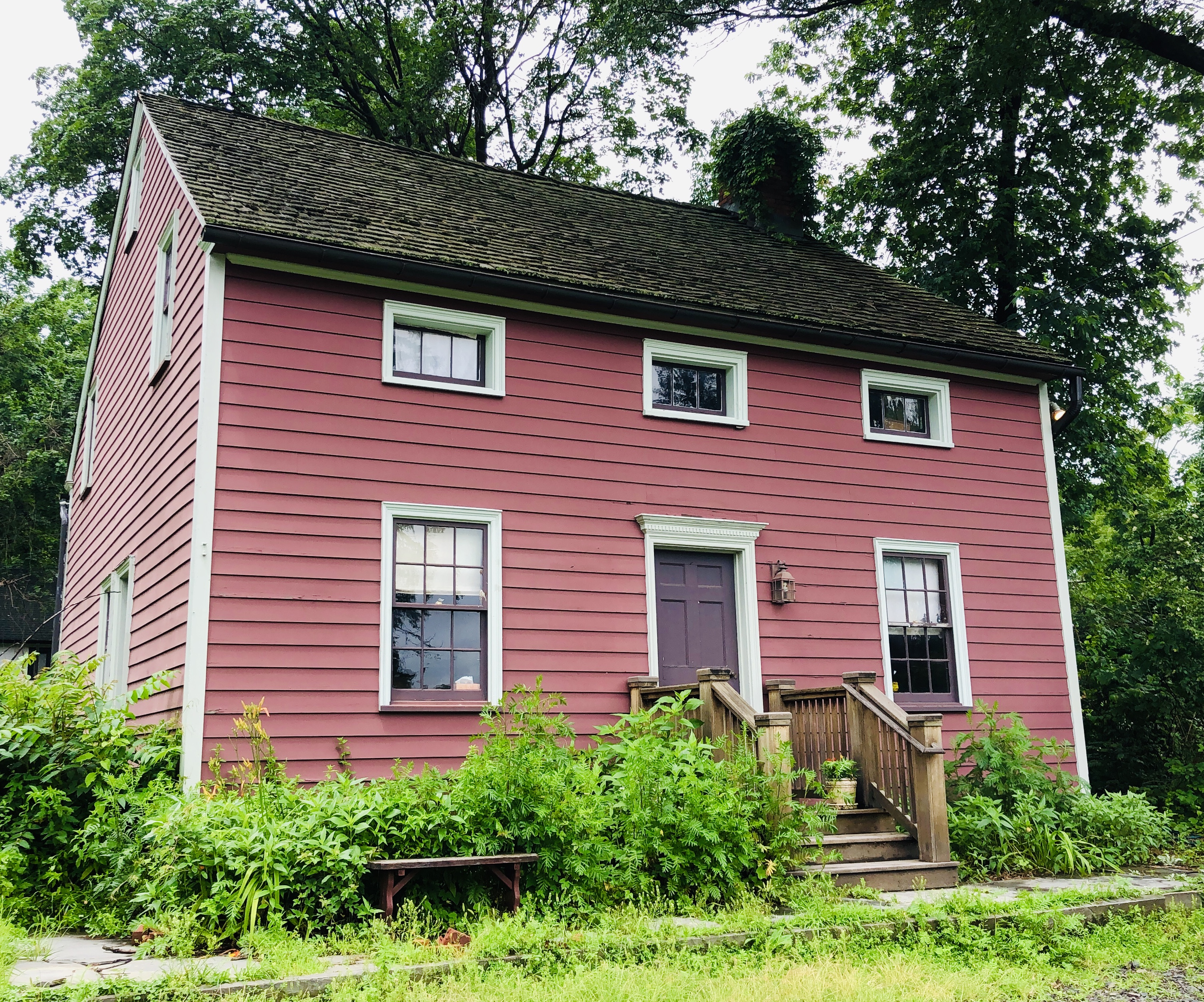
Nathaniel Crane House

The Nathaniel Crane House was built in 1818 by Captain Nathaniel Crane, Jr., Israel Crane's cousin. Captain Nathaniel Crane, Jr., who was a militiaman and patriot from Essex County, built this farmhouse on land that was part of the original 300 acres Jasper Crane (1605–1681) had willed to his sons Azariah and Jasper, Jr. in 1681. In 1694, Azariah built one of the first homes in the area on 55 Myrtle Avenue, near the intersection with Orange Road. A cornerstone from Nathaniel Crane's farmhouse dates back to 1732 from an even older structure. Made from solid oak framing timbers that are fastened by wood joints instead of nails, Nathaniel's house stayed in the Crane family until 1851. That year, it was sold for $4,000 to Stephen Paul along with 25 acres of land. Ossian Hatch bought the property four years later. A year before the American Civil War began, Henry Mason acquired the property. Three years after that, in 1863, Dr. James Henry Clark (1814–1869) purchased the house and used it as a retirement home until he died. At the time, Dr. Clark was an Army surgeon stationed in Newark.

In 1894, the ell (likely the kitchen) of Nathaniel Crane's old house was torn down while the larger section was rolled on logs by Dr. James Henry Clark, Jr. towards its new location in the backyard of 108 Orange Road. After being placed onto small brick piers, James likely used it as an outbuilding, such as a carriage house or a barn. While he was building the house that now bears his name, Dr. Clark incorporated some original Nathaniel Crane House artifacts such as a mantel piece, the brass andirons and fender, and the mahogany stair rail.

In 1962, the Nathaniel Crane House was purchased by Dr. and Mrs. Martin Sampson. As part of the purchase of the larger Victorian house next door, it was sold by Dr. Clark's grandniece, Ann Borden-Smith. In 1974, the Sampsons donated the Nathaniel Crane House to the Montclair Historical Society. It was moved about seventy-five feet south in order to be located on the adjacent property of the recently relocated Israel Crane House. The 1732 stone was moved along with it, where it has remained ever since.

Today, the Nathaniel Crane House is used by the Montclair History Center as a visitor center and an exhibit of a nineteenth-century general store on the first floor much like the one owned by Israel Crane in the early nineteenth century. On the second floor, there is an exhibit featuring a nineteenth-century schoolroom illustrating nineteenth-century education in Montclair. During tours, visitors can view a portion of the house's interior simple framing construction through a glass window.

== James Henry Clark House ==
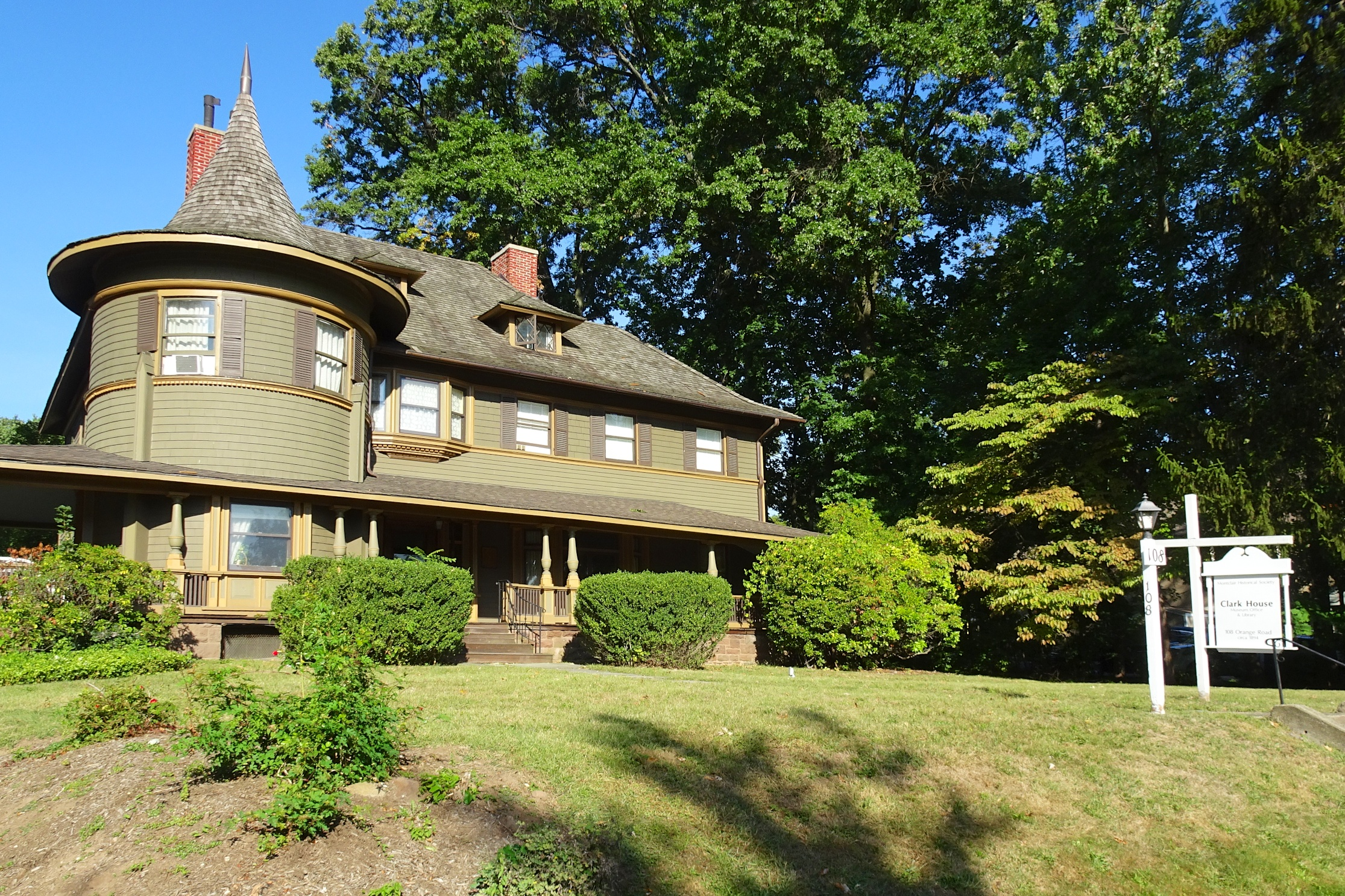
James Henry Clark House

Dr. James Henry Clark, Jr. (1853–1945) and his wife Carrie Schenck (1859–1901) built the 2 1/2-story Queen Anne style house at 108 Orange Road in 1894 on land that was part of the original 300 acres Jasper Crane (1605–1681) had willed to his sons Azariah and Jasper, Jr. Dr. Clark's father was an Army surgeon during the Civil War. His first cousin, Abraham Clark, was a signer of the Declaration of Independence and a descendant of the signers of the Mayflower Compact.

The home has four bay windows and a large porch running across the full length of the entrance. There is a two-story turret with conical roof that defines the south corner of the house. There are decorative wood moldings above and below the second-floor windows, which form a band around the house and turret. A bay window extends on the first floor to the south and two hipped dormers with diamond configurations in the casements break the roof line.

Members of the Clark family occupied the home until 1962, when Dr. and Mrs. M. C. Sampson purchased it. In 1985, Montclair Historical Society bought the house. Today it is used as the Montclair History Center's educational, research, and administrative complex, including exhibits and the Albert Payson Terhune Library, which in turn is dedicated to the preservation of local resources unique to Montclair. The Clark House is part of the First Residential Historic District, which contains the largest concentration of documented houses in the Township of Montclair. It was added to the State Register of Historic Places in 1996 (ID#1128).

== See also ==
- List of historical societies in New Jersey
