= Grape juice =

Drink made from grapes

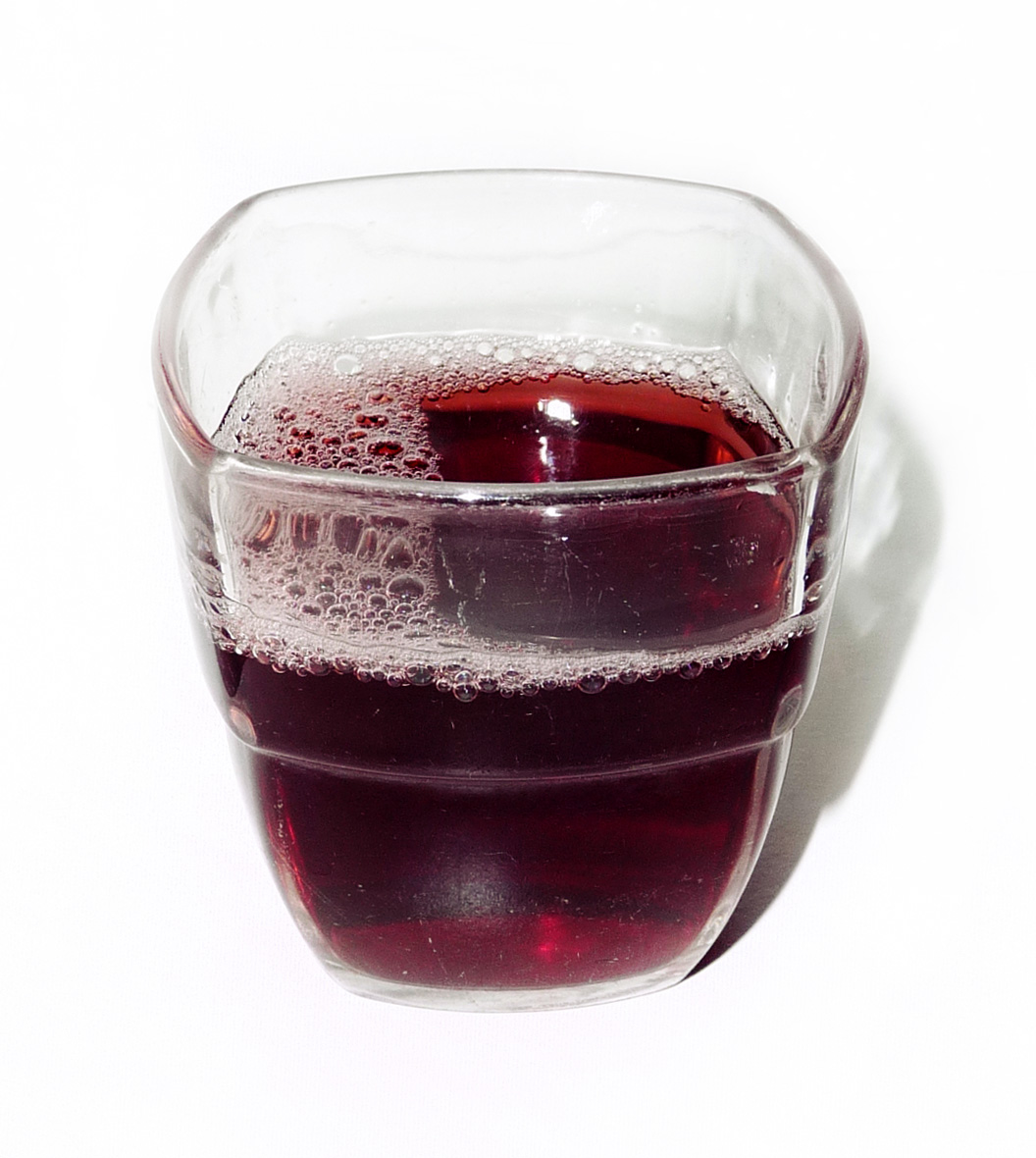
A glass of grape juice.

Grape juice is obtained from crushing and blending grapes into a liquid. In the wine industry, grape juice that contains 7–23 percent of pulp, skins, stems and seeds is often referred to as must. The sugars in grape juice allow it to be used as a sweetener, fermented, and made into wine, brandy, or vinegar.

In North America, the most common grape juice is purple and made from Concord grapes, while white grape juice is commonly made from Niagara grapes, both of which are varieties of native American grapes, a different species from European wine grapes.

Grape juice can be made from all grape varieties after reaching appropriate maturity. Because of consumer preferences for characteristics in color, flavor and aroma, grape juice is primarily produced from American cultivars of Vitis labrusca, the Concord grape.

== History ==
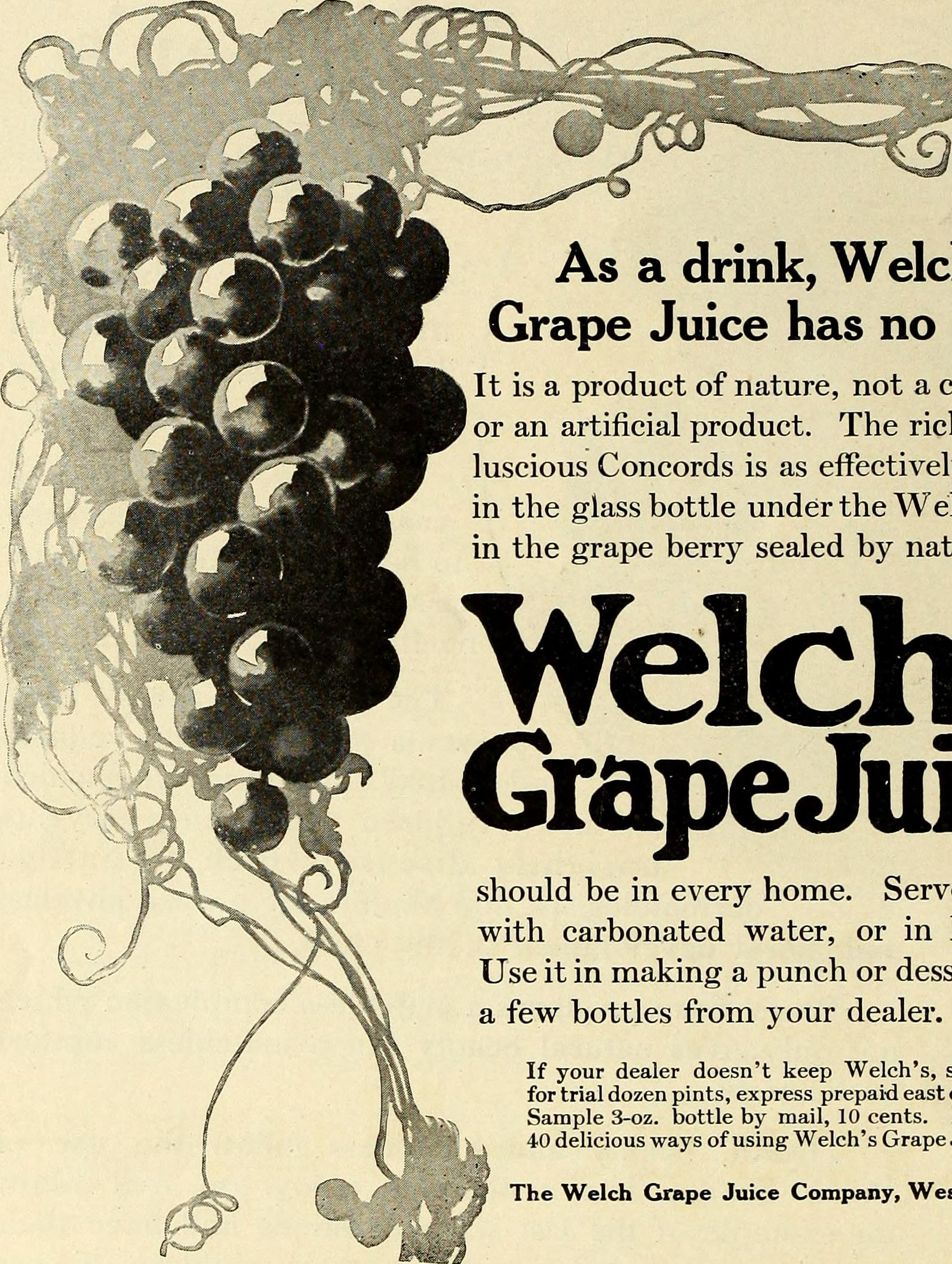
A 1910 advertisement for Welch's grape juice

The method of pasteurizing grape juice to halt fermentation has been attributed to an American physician and dentist, Thomas Bramwell Welch, in 1869. A supporter of the temperance movement, he produced a non-alcoholic wine to be used for church services in his hometown of Vineland, New Jersey. His fellow parishioners continued to prefer and use regular wine. His son, Charles E. Welch, who was also a dentist, eventually gave up his practice to promote grape juice. In 1893, he founded Welch's Grape Juice Company at Westfield, New York. The product was given to visitors at international exhibitions. The oldest extant structure associated with the company is Welch Factory Building No. 1, located at Westfield, and listed on the National Register of Historic Places in 1983.

As the temperance movement grew, so did the popularity of grape juice. In 1913, US Secretary of State William Jennings Bryan served grape juice instead of wine during a full-dress diplomatic function, and in 1914, Josephus Daniels, Secretary of the Navy, forbade any alcoholic drinks on board of naval ships, actively replacing them with grape juice. During World War I, the company supplied "grapelade", a type of grape jam, to the military and advertised aggressively. Subsequent development of new grape products and sponsorship of radio and television programs made Welch's a successful company as a major world producer of grape juice. In 2025, the Welch's cooperative for growing grapes to make juice includes 600 farms in the United States.

== Ingredients and composition ==
Grape juice from concentrate means that excess water from the grapes was removed, making the juice more concentrated. This allows the juice to be compressed and frozen to make packaging and transporting easier. Water is then added to the juice before being sold. A major brand of American grape juice – Welch's – is made from Concord grapes, using the entire grape (pulp, skin and seeds). A small amount of citric acid is naturally found in grapes, and may be added for tart taste and antioxidant properties to inhibit oxidation, enabling a longer storage life.

== Production ==
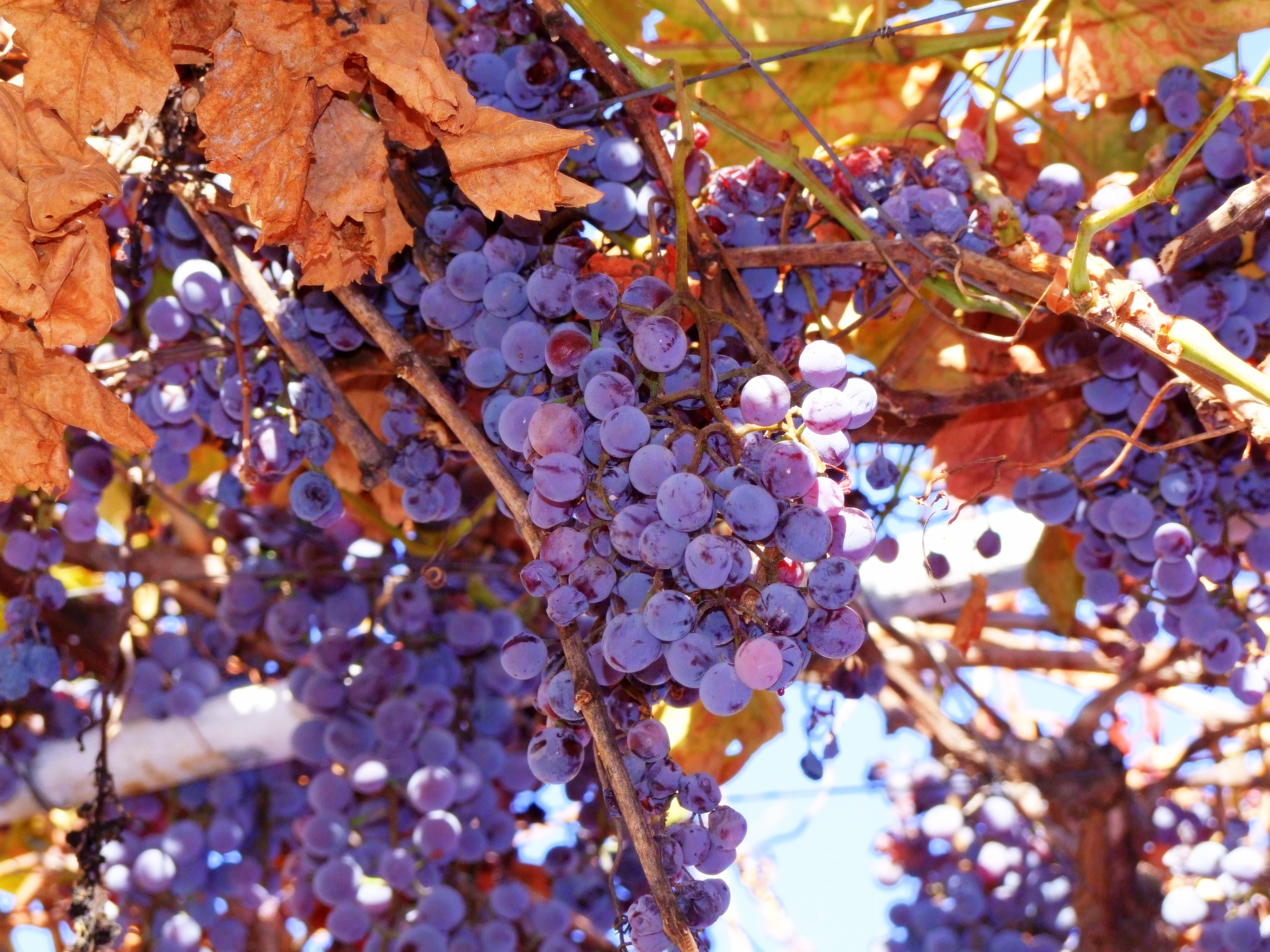
Concord grapes (Vitis labrusca), commonly used for making red grape juice

Around mid-September in the Northern Hemisphere, the grapes are harvested mechanically, using a grape harvesting machine (e.g. Chisholm-Ryder grape harvester), and placed in a bulk box that is transported separately by a tractor or truck. The harvested grapes are then delivered to the processing facility within 4 to 6 hours.^{(p93)}

A rotating perforated drum removes any stems and leaves that remain attached to the grapes. Once they are detached from the stems, the grapes are subsequently crushed and pass through the holes of the drum. Stems, leaves and other residuals continue along the drum to be removed as waste.^{(p93)} The crushed grapes are heated to 60 °C (140 °F) as they move through a shell and tube heat exchanger. A press aid (e.g. sterilized rice hulls, bleached Kraft paper, ground wood pulp) and a pectinase enzyme are two components that are both added to the grapes at this point for effective juice pressing. The mash of the grapes and press aid is pressed at high temperatures for maximal yield of colour and juice.^{(p95)} There are various types of pressing equipment that can be used for this process (screw, hydraulic, belt, and pneumatic).^{(p96)} Pressed juice and free run juice are held in slurry tanks. The press aid is added to the juice, serving as a filter when the juice undergoes rotary vacuum belt filtration to remove insoluble solids. The juice contains minimal insoluble solids (1% or lower) after filtration.^{(p97-98)} The filtered juice is heated to 85–88 °C (185–190 °F) for at least one minute and is then cooled to −1.1–0 °C (30.0–32.0 °F) before it is stored in tanks. The stored juice may undergo necessary re-pasteurization if there is any presence of alcohol, yeasts and moulds.^{(98–99)} Additional pectinase is added to speed up and simplify the final filtration process. This filtration process involves diatomaceous earth suspended in the grape juice as it passes through a pre-coated pad or plate. The latter two processes are intended to reduce or prevent sedimentation once the juice is bottled and stored for a long duration of time.^{(p99-100)}

There are other process alternatives that can be applied to the processing grape juice, including cold-pressing the juice, and adding sulfur dioxide to the juice.^{(p101-104)} The juice can be further processed by removing water to produce a pure concentrate that can be used in a variety of juice products.

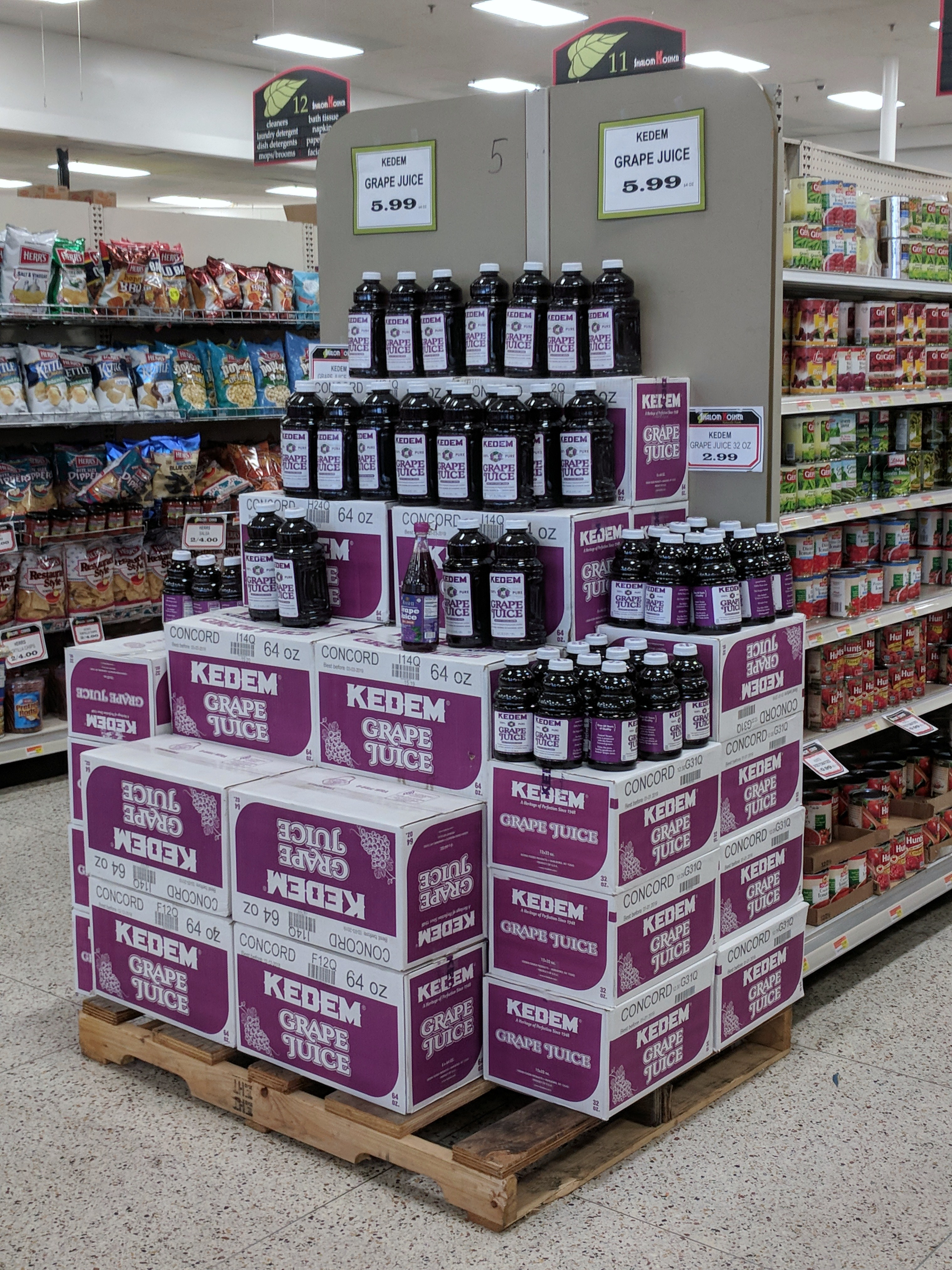
Bottled grape juice display in a supermarket

== Packaging and storage ==
Hot filling is traditionally used to package grape juice. In this process, grape juice is heated to a minimum of 77–82 °C (171–180 °F) using a heat exchanger before the juice is poured into preheated containers made of materials such as glass or newer, heat resistant plastics. Glass presents a more high quality appearance, but can also be quite fragile and bulky compared to plastics. Pasteurization can also be used afterwards to prolong its shelf life by heating the juice to 85 °C (185 °F) for 3 minutes before cooling it down. At the highest quality of retention, unopened grape juice can be stored for 6–12 months unrefrigerated. After opening, grape juice can be stored for approximately 7–10 days in the refrigerator before spoilage occurs.

Aseptic processing can also be used, which requires the grape juice to be sterilized before packaging. There are different methods of sterilization. Sterile filtration can be used for clarified grape juice with no particulate matter, which uses membranes with a pore size that is small enough to filter out microorganisms (<0.45 μm). Thermal sterilization can also be used by heating the juice to a temperature of 93–100 °C (199–212 °F) for 15–45 seconds. Additionally, the container itself must also be sterilized with a chemical sterilizing agent like hydrogen peroxide. This process is beneficial for packaging materials such as Tetra Paks that cannot withstand high temperatures. The containers must then be filled in a sterile environment and can be stored for at least six months unrefrigerated. Although aseptic packaging is more costly, it maximizes shelf life and results in less heat damage and nutrient losses compared to hot filling.

== Grape varieties ==
Commercial grape juice does not use the same varieties of grapes known for eating as "table grapes". Due to the large selection of grape varieties, considerations that go into the choice of grape species include factors such as consumer preferences, grape disease resistance, and tolerance to climate. The purple-skinned Concord grape is the most common grape used for juice in North America due to its durability to its environment and its labrusca "foxy" flavor that comes from its methyl anthranilate properties. This type of grape can also be used for wines and jelly. The green grapes that are used for white grape juice lack the phytochemicals that give their purple counterparts their dark color.

== Religious uses ==
=== Catholicism ===
In certain circumstances, the Catholic Church allows mustum to be used instead of fermented wine for the celebration of the Eucharist. Mustum is defined as "grape juice that is either fresh or preserved by methods that suspend its fermentation without altering its nature (for example, freezing)."

=== Protestantism ===
Some Protestant denominations (specifically those which oppose the use of alcoholic beverages by members) use grape juice in their celebration of the Eucharist. The Baptist and Methodist denominations are the most notable.

=== Judaism ===
The American grape juice manufacturer, Welch's, obtained kosher certification to facilitate sales of its products for consumption on the Sabbath and during Passover.

Alcohol is permitted by traditional Jewish law and wine is used for sacramental purposes. The Jewish legal code, the Talmud, in tractate Bava Batra 97b, permits the use of unfermented fresh grape juice for sacramental use. Later legal codes have ruled that while wine is preferable to grape juice, grape juice is permitted for blessings and rituals on Shabbat, the Jewish Sabbath.

== See also ==
- Juicing
- List of juices
- Grape drink
