= Welch Factory Building No. 1 =

- U.S. National Register of Historic Places
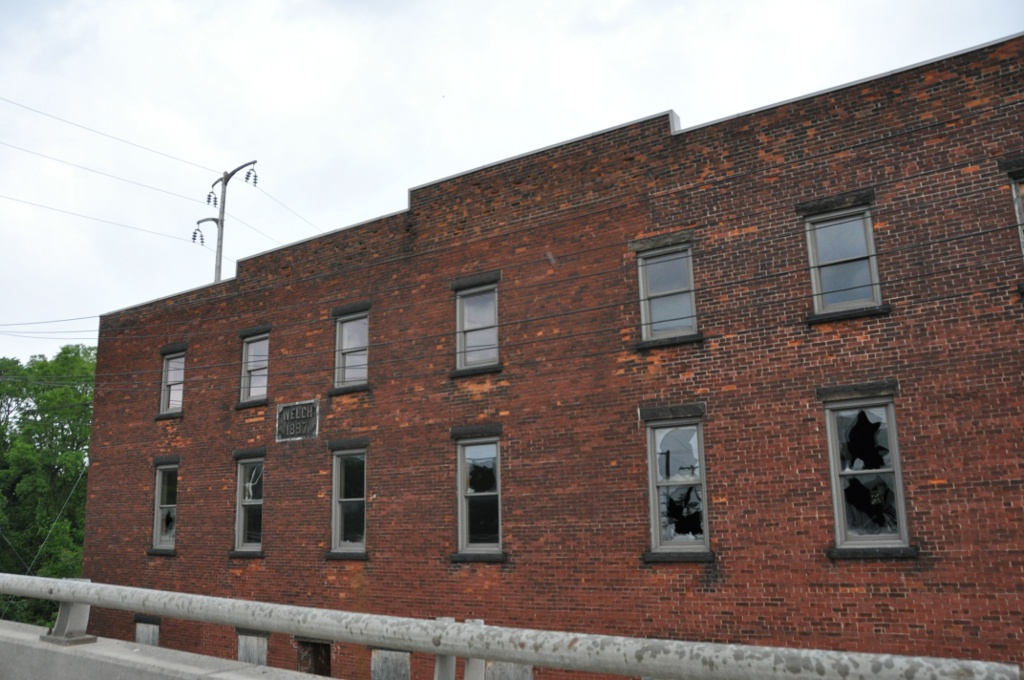
- Welch Factory Building No. 1, June 2012

- Location within New York Location within the United States
- Location: 101 N. Portage St., Westfield, New York
- Coordinates: 42°19′35″N 79°34′55″W
- Built: 1897
- Architect: Sutherland
- MPS: Westfield Village MRA
- NRHP reference No.: 83001658
- Added to NRHP: September 26, 1983

Welch Factory Building No. 1 is a historic grape juice factory located at Westfield in Chautauqua County, New York. It was built in 1897 and expanded in 1899 and 1903, to be an 8-bay wide, 10-bay deep rectangular building. It is the oldest extant structure associated with the Welch's company.

It was listed on the National Register of Historic Places in 1983.

The plant was built by Charles E. Welch and is only 17 miles from the current Welch's facility in North East, PA. Dr. Welch opened the plant in Chautauqua County, the largest grape growing county outside of California. The plant was built along a spur of the New York, Chicago and St. Louis Railroad and is still located near a rail line for Conrail, still receiving rail service.
