= The Pleasure Boat =

19th-century religious publication in Portland, Maine

The Pleasure Boat was a reform journal published in Portland, Maine, during the mid-nineteenth century by the Quaker reformer and journalist Jeremiah Hacker.

== History ==
Over the first seventeen years of publication (1845–1862), it went by the names The Pleasure Boat and The Portland Pleasure Boat; and some years later was revived under the new title The Chariot of Wisdom and Love (1864–1866). Hacker, after moving to New Jersey in 1866, briefly returned to the "Boat" theme and published the short-lived journal Hacker's Pleasure Boat (1867).

== Editorial stance ==
In all of his publications, Hacker was an outspoken journalist who promoted anarchist and radical causes. The Pleasure Boat railed against organized religion, government, prisons, slavery, land monopoly, and warfare. It supported abolition, women’s rights, temperance, and vegetarianism. The newspaper was an early proponent of anarchism, free thought, and prison reformer. Unhappy with how juvenile offenders were treated in the adult prisons, Hacker was influential in building public support for a Maine reform school which became the third in the country, after Philadelphia and Boston.

The Pleasure Boat was the earliest known vegetarian publication in Maine.
