= Crane House and Historic YWCA =

Historic house in New Jersey, United States

- U.S. National Register of Historic Places
- New Jersey Register of Historic Places
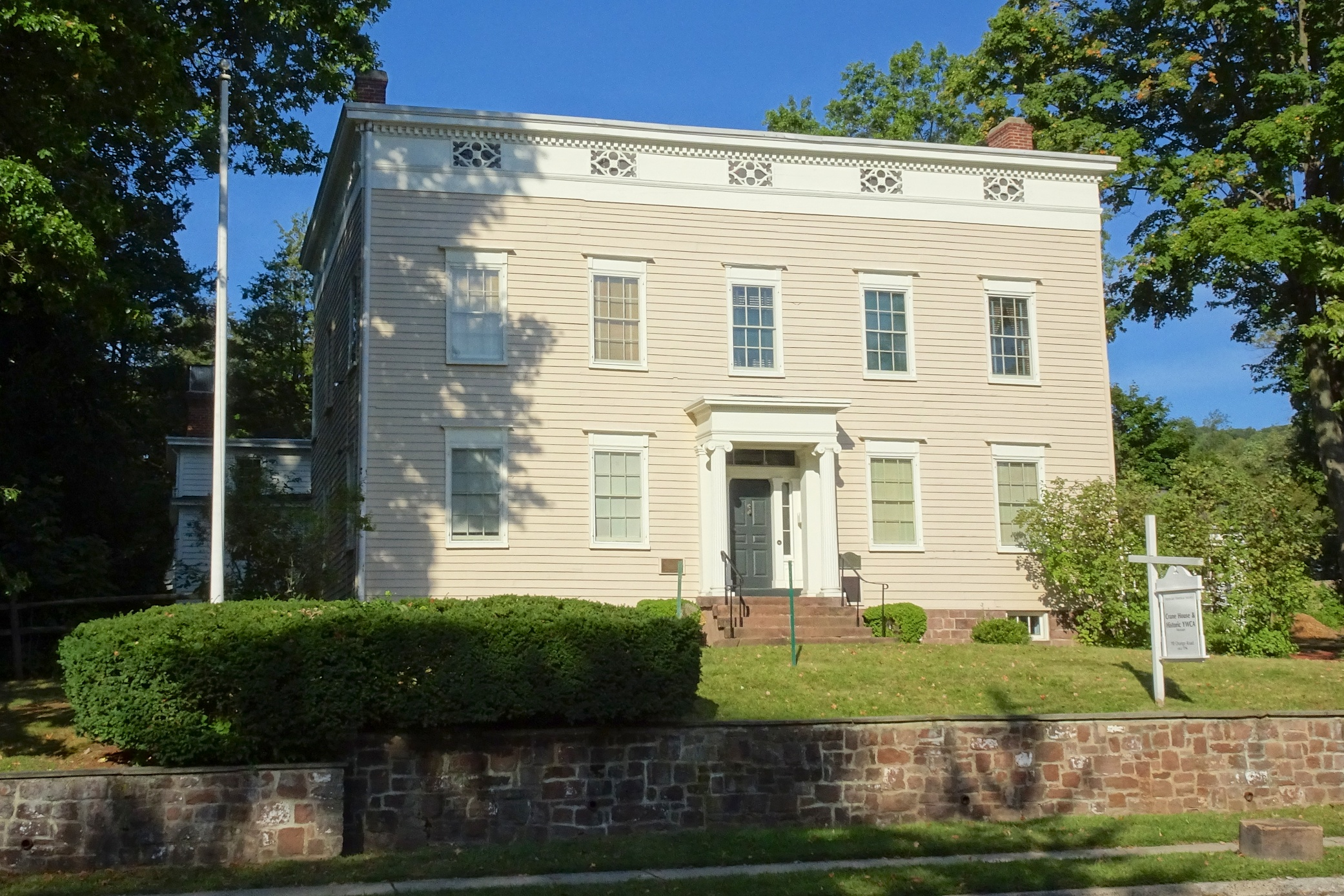
- Crane House and Historic YWCA in 2016

- Location within Essex County, New Jersey Location within New Jersey Location within the United States
- Location: 110 Orange Road; Montclair, New Jersey
- Coordinates: 40.81155°N 74.22299°W
- Area: 1.1 acres (0.45 ha)
- Built: 1796
- NRHP reference No.: 73001091
- NJRHP No.: 1118

Significant dates
- Added to NRHP: March 14, 1973
- Designated NJRHP: August 7, 1972

The Crane House and Historic YWCA is a federal-style home located at 110 Orange Road in Montclair, Essex County, New Jersey. The house has had a rich history and was added to the National Register of Historic Places on March 14, 1973, for its significance in architecture, conservation, and industry.

== History ==
The Crane House was built by Israel Crane in 1796 on Old Road (now Glen Ridge Avenue) in Cranetown, which is now the southern part of the Township of Montclair. The house stayed in the Crane family until 1920, when it was purchased by the YWCA. The YWCA used the house for offices, dormitories and as a social center for African American women and girls for 45 years. In 1965, the house faced the prospect of demolition. Local residents committed to its preservation organized and the house was moved from Old Road to 110 Orange Road, its current address.

The Crane House and Historic YWCA is one of the few remaining federal mansions in northern New Jersey. It currently operates as the Crane House and Historic YWCA, which is open to the public for tours. The Crane House and Historic YWCA neighbors two other buildings with historic significance: the Clark House, which houses the Albert Payson Terhune library, and the Nathaniel Crane House, which houses a General Store collection, schoolroom, and gift shop. These buildings are also owned by the Montclair History Center.

== Israel Crane and his commitment to commerce ==
Israel Crane (b. 1774) was a direct descendant of the Crane family, which founded Cranetown in 1694. He was an enterprising businessman, successful in several industries including cider, cotton and wool production. In 1801, he and a partner leased a site in Paterson, New Jersey, for one of the first mills to use the power of the Passaic River.

In 1806, Crane organized a group to build the Newark-Pompton Turnpike, an industrial toll road of which he later became the sole owner. It was a direct route from Newark, New Jersey to outlying areas, including Cranetown. Today, Bloomfield Avenue, which runs West from Newark through the Township of Montclair into Verona, New Jersey, is part of the original Newark-Pompton Turnpike. Another section has evolved into Route 23, which extends to Port Jervis.

The Israel Crane house has gone through several generations of history. In 1796, Israel Crane had the house built for his family and him. The house was the standard of New Jersey wealth in the Montclair area (this area previously named Cranetown) would have looked like. Documentation shows that Israel Crane owned at least five enslaved individuals: Bill, Joe, Jack, Bett, and Dine.

By the time one of his sons, James Crane, took on the ownership of the house, society had changed around them. According to census records, there is no documentation of James Crane owning enslaved individuals, instead hiring indentured servants. Many of his servants were Irish, not uncommon at the time. James went on to make changes to the structure of the house, incorporating many Greek Revival elements including columns in the front; a flat, rectangular roof; and door jambs. James died in 1882. A 1900 census shows that Phebe Crane, James Crane's wife, had been living there with three of her unmarried daughters who were in their 40s and 50s. After Phebe died in 1902, their three daughters sold the house.

== Visiting the Crane House and Historic YWCA ==
The Crane House and Museum is open to the public for guided and self guided tours on select days.

After a few changes in ownership throughout the years, the old Crane House fell into the hands of the YWCA (Young Women's Christian Association) in 1920. The YWCA was originally started in 1912 by 19 woman from the black community, including Alice Hooe Foster, the first black woman to graduate from Montclair High School. Segregated and with little opportunity for improvement of life quality and opportunities, the YWCA was designed as a way to help young black girls and women to gain the skills and safe social experience needed to get better job opportunities, education furtherment opportunities, and social skills.

The Israel house became a place where African-American women could stay in Montclair while looking for domestic jobs or connections within their own community. The rooms became dormitories and offices.

By 1965, the women of the Y sold the structure to build a new headquarters. A stipend of selling the house was that the structure had to be moved to make way for the new YWCA headquarters.

Despite how Montclair schools were no longer segregated, this did not end the segregation of every other aspect of life–clubs, dances, etc. The women of the Y continued to work towards making the YWCA a place where they could truly flourish up until 1990 when the organization ended. As stated by the website for the Montclair Fund for Women, the YWCA was dissolved in 2001 when the number of participants decreased and maintaining the building became too expensive. Still wanting to support women as they have in the past, the board instead put funds into what is today the Montclair Fund for Women. The Montclair History Center made a documentary in 2014 called “A Place to Become” delving into the history of the Y and its local members. It can be viewed on their YouTube page.

== Exhibits at the Crane House and Historic YWCA ==
The Crane House and Historic YWCA has ten rooms, showcasing 18th, 19th, and 20th century furniture, paintings and decorative arts, including rugs, quilts, ceramics, glassware, silverware, toys, dolls and household items, and reproduced YWCA material. Special items on display include a painted bedroom set owned by Paul Revere IV (1816), a harp made by Sebastian Erard (1827), and a William and Mary highboy (1740).

Early preservationists purchased the house before it could be demolished and had the building physically moved from its original location at Glenridge Avenue to its current location at 110 Orange Road where it now resides. They formed the Montclair Historical Society and worked to restore the building to what it would have looked like in both Israel and James Crane's times. Until 2014, the house focused on its early American history. Currently, the Montclair History Center incorporates the story of the YWCA to tell the full story of the house during its entire use from 1796 to 1965.

== See also ==
- National Register of Historic Places listings in Essex County, New Jersey
- List of museums in New Jersey
