= Welch's =

American company

- Type: Agricultural cooperative
- Industry: Beverages and foods
- Founded: 1869; 157 years ago Vineland, New Jersey
- Founder: Thomas Bramwell Welch
- Headquarters: Waltham, Massachusetts, U.S.
- Products: Fruit snacks Grape cider Grape juice Grape soda Jams; Jellies; Niagara grape juice Soft drink
- Parent: National Grape Cooperative Association and PIM Brands, Inc (fruit snacks)
- Website: Welchs.com

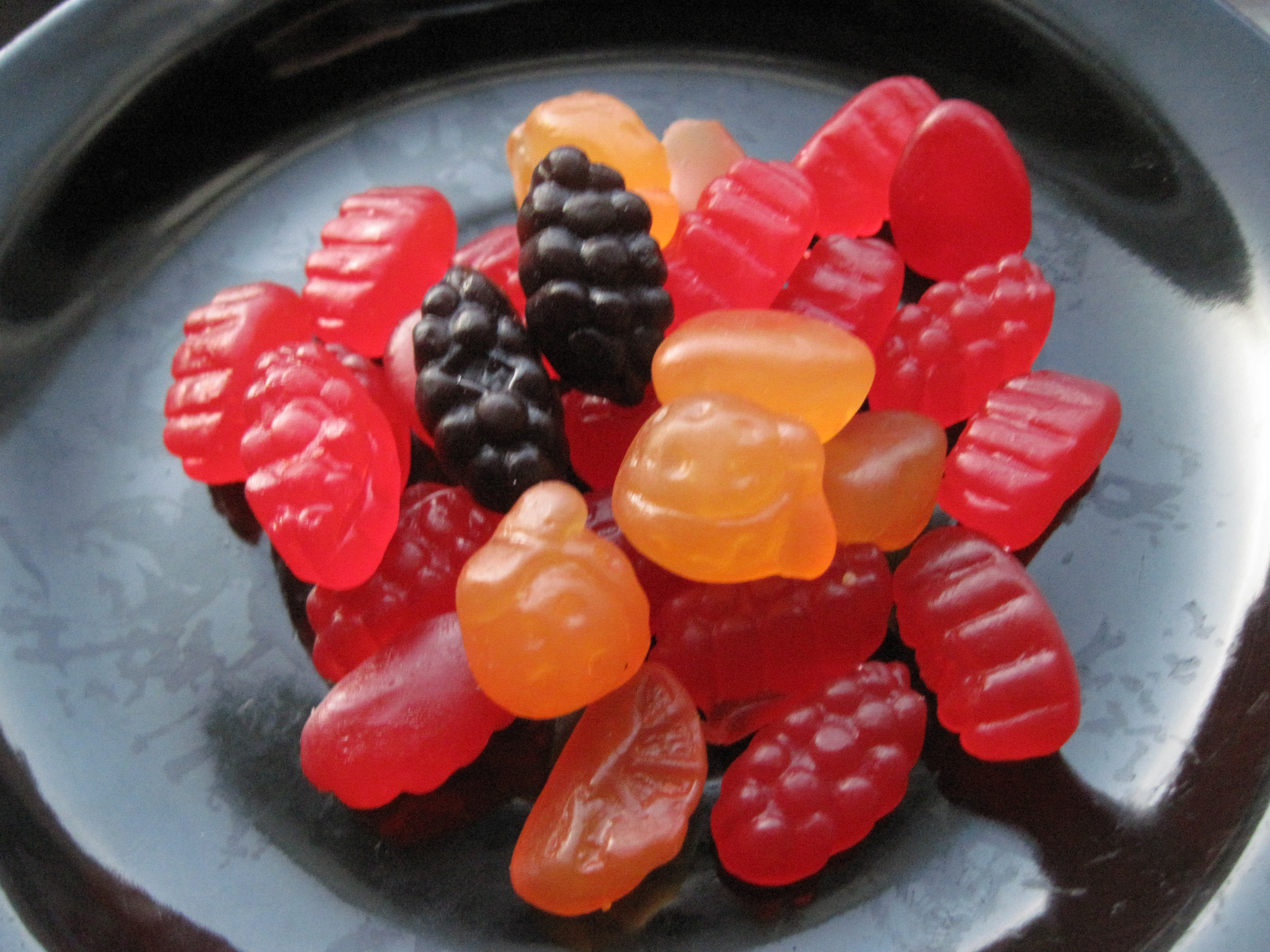
Welch's fruit snacks

Welch Foods Inc., commonly known as Welch's, is an American company, headquartered in Waltham, Massachusetts. It has been owned by the National Grape Cooperative Association, a co-op of grape growers, since 1956. Welch's is particularly known for its grape juices, jams and jellies made from dark Concord grapes and its white Niagara grape juice. The company also manufactures and markets an array of other products, including refrigerated juices, frozen and shelf-stable concentrates, organic grape juice, fruit snacks, and dried fruit. Welch's has also licensed its name for a line of grape-flavored soft drinks since 1974. Welch's grape and strawberry soda flavors are currently licensed to Global Beverage Corporation. Other popular products that use the Welch's name are the fruit snacks made by The Promotion In Motion Companies, Inc.

== History ==
The company was founded in Vineland, New Jersey, in 1869 by teetotal dentist Thomas Bramwell Welch and his son Charles Welch.

In 1956, the company was sold to the National Grape Cooperative Association, which comprises 1,300 grape growers located in Michigan, New York, Ohio, Pennsylvania, Maryland, Washington and Ontario, Canada.

In the 1960s, Welch's was a major sponsor of the ABC primetime animated comedy series The Flintstones. The Flintstones characters were prominently featured in Welch's TV commercials on that show, and on jars of Welch's grape jelly which could be used as a drinking glass after the product had been fully used. In the early 1970s, the Archies cartoon characters were on the jars.

== Physical plant ==
The oldest extant structure associated with the company is Welch Factory Building No. 1, located at Westfield, New York, and listed on the National Register of Historic Places in 1983. The company's largest manufacturing plant is located 17 miles away in North East, Pennsylvania.

== History of Welch's Grape Juice ==
The method of pasteurizing grape juice to halt the fermentation has been attributed to a British–American physician and dentist, Thomas Bramwell Welch (1825–1903) in 1869. Welch was an adherent to the Wesleyan Methodist Connexion which strongly opposed "manufacturing, buying, selling, or using intoxicating liquors" and advocated the use of unfermented grape juice instead of wine for administering Holy Communion during the church service. A few years earlier, Welch had relocated to Vineland, New Jersey, a town started in 1861 by Philadelphia land developer Charles K. Landis (1833–1900) to create his own alcohol-free utopian society, a "Temperance Town" based on agriculture and progressive thinking. Landis declared that he was "about to build a city, and an agricultural and fruit-growing colony around it." The population reached 5,500 by 1865. Landis determined the potential in growing grapes and named the settlement "Vineland", and advertised to attract Italian grape growers to Vineland, offering 20 acres (81,000 m^{2}) of land that had to be cleared and used to grow grapes. Welch had moved to the region following his sister who was one of Vineland's earliest residents and began to produce an "unfermented wine" (grape juice) from locally grown grapes that was marketed as "Dr. Welch's Unfermented Wine". This product became "Welch's Grape Juice" in 1893 when Welch and his son Charles E. Welch (also a practicing dentist) had decided to incorporate in 1893 as the Welch's Grape Juice Company at Westfield, New York. The product was given to visitors at international exhibitions.

As the temperance movement grew, so did the popularity of grape juice. In 1913, Secretary of State William Jennings Bryan served grape juice instead of wine during a formal diplomatic function, and in 1914, Josephus Daniels, Secretary of the Navy, forbade any alcoholic drinks on board naval ships, actively replacing them with grape juice. During World War I, the company supplied "grapelade", a type of grape jam, to the military and advertised aggressively. Subsequent development of new grape products and sponsorship of radio and television programs made the company very successful.

== Current products ==
Welch's produces a variety of juices, jellies/jams, and fruit snacks.

=== Juices ===
==== 100% juices ====
- Concord Grape
- Concord Grape with Calcium
- Concord Grape with Fiber
- Red Grape
- White Grape
- White Grape Cherry
- White Grape Peach
- Black Cherry Concord Grape
- Apple
- Pineapple Apple
- Orange

==== Juice drinks ====
- Fruit Punch
- Mango Twist
- Orange Pineapple Apple
- Peach Medley
- Cranberry Juice Cocktail
- Apple Cranberry
- Grape
- Passion Fruit
- Mango Passion Fruit
- Mango Pineapple
- Orange Pineapple
- Strawberry Kiwi
- Tropical Carrot
- Cherry Pomegranate

==== Refrigerated juices ====
- Concord Grape
- Passion Fruit
- Berry Pineapple Passion Fruit
- Guava Pineapple
- Mountain Berry
- Mango Twist
- Dragon Fruit Mango
- Watermelon Lemonade

==== Diet and light juices ====
- Diet Concord Grape
- Diet Cranberry Grape
- Light Concord Grape

==== Sparkling Juices ====
- Sparkling Red Grape
- Sparkling White Grape
- Sparling Rosé Grape
- Sparkling Cider
- Sparkling Sangria
- Sparkling Strawberry Daiquiri

=== Jellies/jams ===
- Concord Grape Jelly
- Concord Grape Jam
- Natural Concord Grape Spread
- Reduced Sugar Concord Grape Jelly
- Strawberry Spread
- Natural Strawberry Spread

=== Snacks ===
- Fruit snacks
- PB&J sealed crustless sandwiches
- Juicefuls
- Fruit Strips
- Fruit 'n Yogurt
- Fresh Fruit
- Organic Juice Ice Bar
- Sparkling Soda
- Slush Pouch (Concord Berry, Concord Grape, White Grape Cherry, and White Grape Peach)
- Protein Smoothies
- Gelatin (Grape and Strawberry Peach)

== Advertising ==
Welch's long-time traditional advertising partner is The Via Agency in Portland, Maine and in the Fall of 2016 announced that Jack Morton Worldwide's Genuine group will be handling the mobile, social, and digital media and strategy. The company is looking to reach consumers on digital channels with advertising aimed at informing about Welch's products, ingredients, and the company's long heritage.

Welch's has featured people in their television commercials such as:

- Travis Tedford
- Emily Mae Young
- Isla Ng
- Shyann McClure
- Alton Brown
