= Grāpple =

Brand of apples treated with grape flavoring

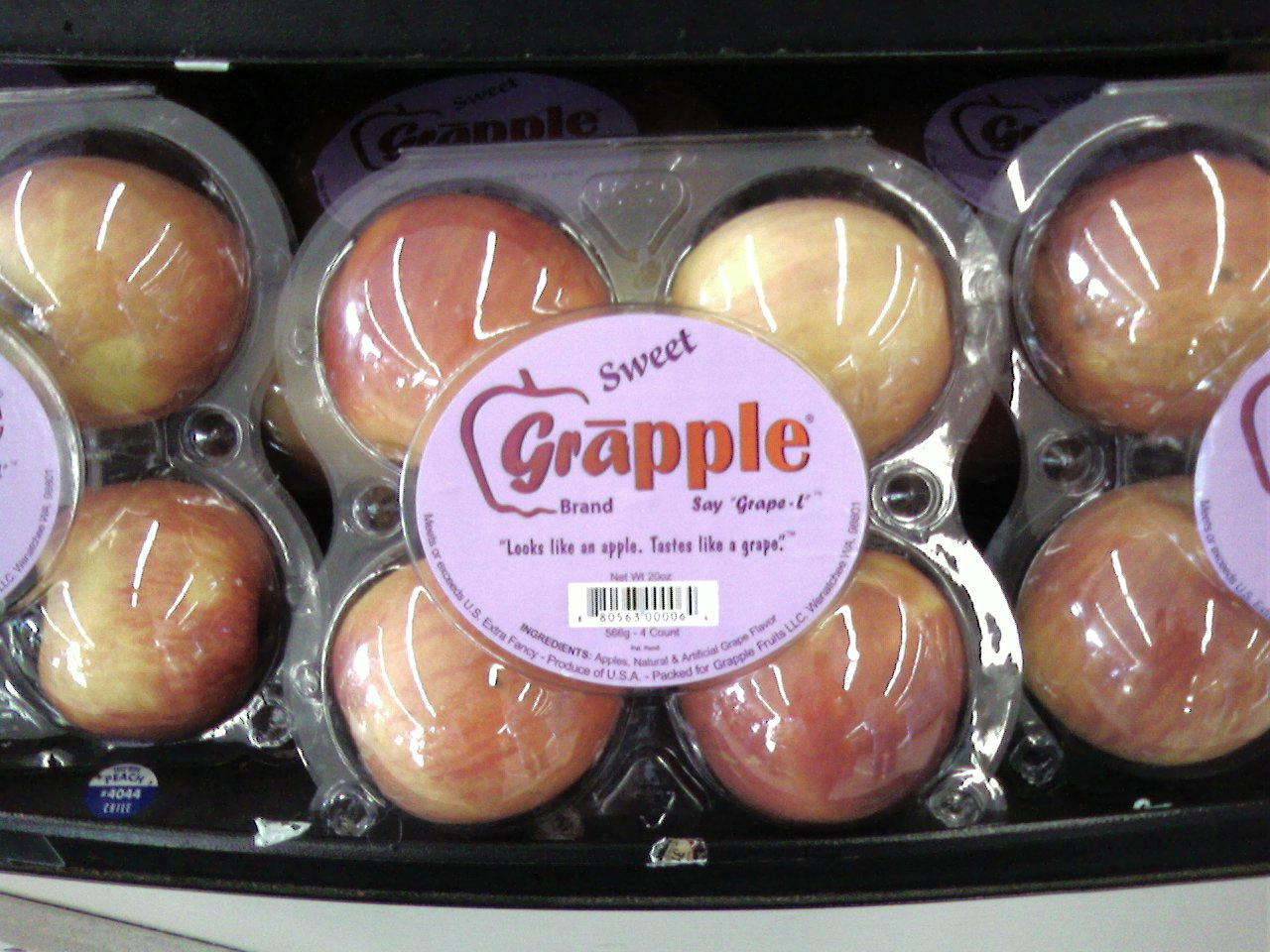
A four-pack of Grāpples on a supermarket stand in S. San Francisco, United States.

Grāpple (/ˈɡreɪpəl/ GRAYP-əl) is the registered brand name for a commercially marketed brand of Fuji or Gala apple that has been soaked in a solution of concentrated methyl anthranilate (grape flavor) and diluted with water in order to make the flesh of the apple taste like a Concord grape. The solution does not add additional sugars or caloric content, nor does it affect the nutritional value of a standard apple. All ingredients are approved by the US Department of Agriculture and the US Food and Drug Administration, with the production process licensed by the Washington State Department of Agriculture. Contrary to what the name implies, it is an externally flavored fruit product, not a true hybrid of two fruits.

These processes were initially patented in 2004 under patent No. 7824723, with revisions in 2007, and 2010, with the latter being the final patent. The patent was granted to one Mr. Gary A. Snyder, or Snyder LLC., who let the patent expire in 2022, under fee-related reasoning.

The brand started selling products in 2004 and was the subject of an allergen study in 2007 after two individuals reported a food allergy to the fruit. In 2016, Grapple Fruits launched a more tart flavor at the PMA Fresh Summit in Orlando, Florida.

As of 2024, the parent company responsible for the production of Grapple has discontinued both variants of the grape-flavored apple, citing low sales, declining interest, and poor publicity.
