= List of historical societies in New Jersey =

The following is a list of historical societies in the state of New Jersey, United States.

== Organizations ==
- Atlantic County Historical Society
- Avalon Historical Society
- Basking Ridge Historical Society
- Beavertown Historical Society
- Bergen County Historical Society
- Boonton Historical Society
- Burlington County Historical Society
- Camden County Historical Society
- Greater Cape May Historical Society
- Chatham Historical Society
- Chester Historical Society
- Chesterfield Historical Society
- Cranford Historical Preservation Advisory Board
- Cumberland County Historical Society, New Jersey
- Denville Historical Society
- East Orange Historical Society
- Ewing Township Historic Preservation Society
- Florham Park Historical Society
- Gloucester County Historical Society
- Hackettstown Historical Society
- Howell Historical Society
- Historical Society of Hudson County
- Hunterdon County Historical Society
- Jewish Historical Society of Metrowest
- Lambertville Historical Society
- Lawnside Historical Society
- Livingston Historical Society
- Long-A-Coming Historical Society
- Longport Historical Society
- Madison Historical Society
- Monmouth County Historical Association
- Montclair History Center
- Historical Society of Moorestown
- Morris County Historical Society
- Mount Tabor Historical Society
- Navy Lakehurst Historical Society
- New Brunswick Historical Club
- New Jersey Historical Society
- Ocean City Historical Society
- Ocean County Historical Society
- Historical Society of Ocean Grove
- Palisades Amusement Park Historical Society
- Parsippany Historical & Preservation Society
- Passaic County Historical Society
- Plainfield Historical Society
- Historical Society of Princeton
- Salem County Historical Society
- Somerset County Historical Society
- Historical Society of the Somerset Hills
- Summit Historical Society
- Sussex County Historical Society
- Trenton Historical Society
- Union County Historical Society
- Van Harlingen Historical Society
- Vineland Historical and Antiquarian Society
- Weehawken Historical Society
- Historical Society of Winslow Township

== Images ==
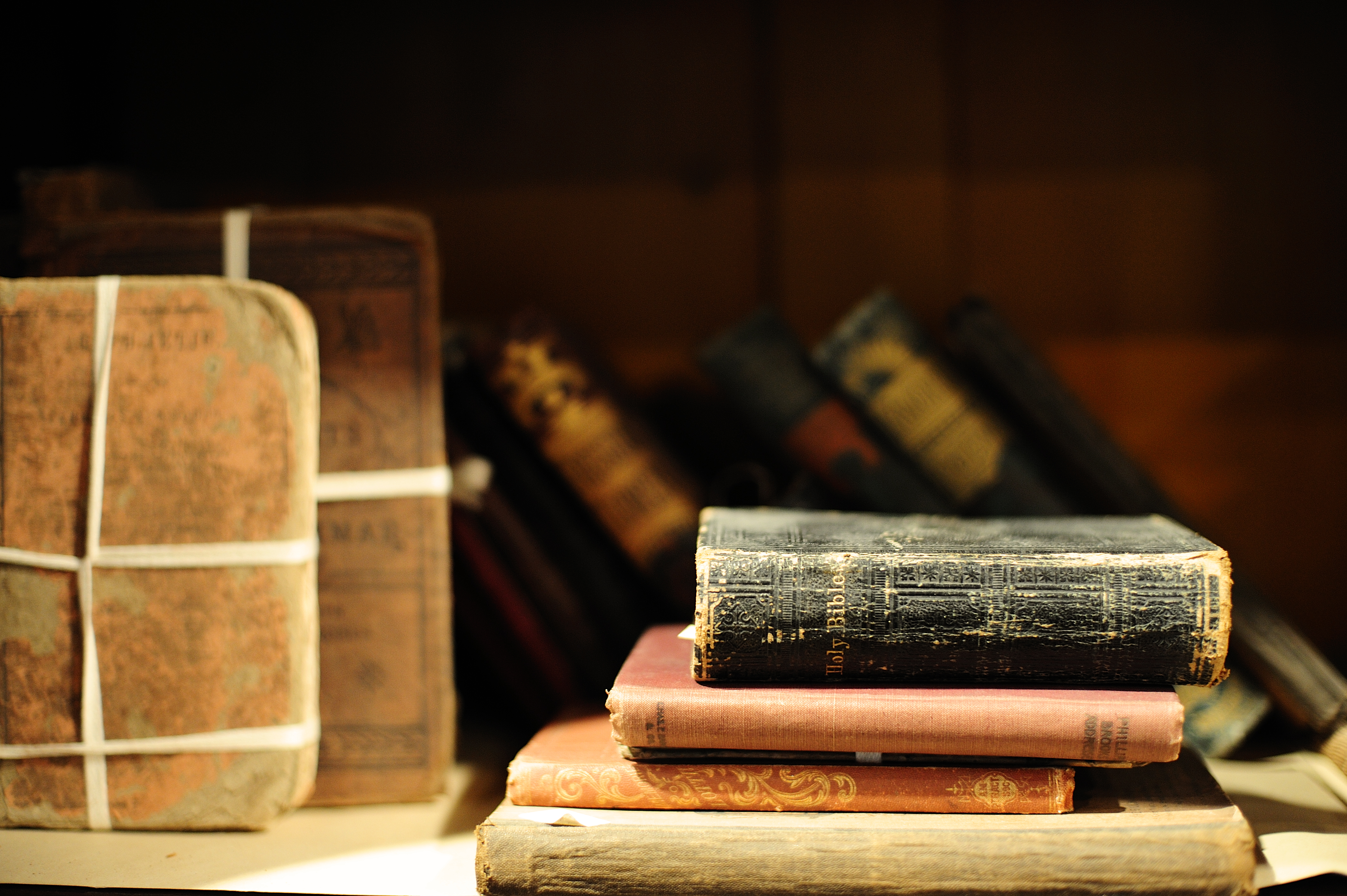
Books in the collection of the Basking Ridge Historical Society, New Jersey, 2008

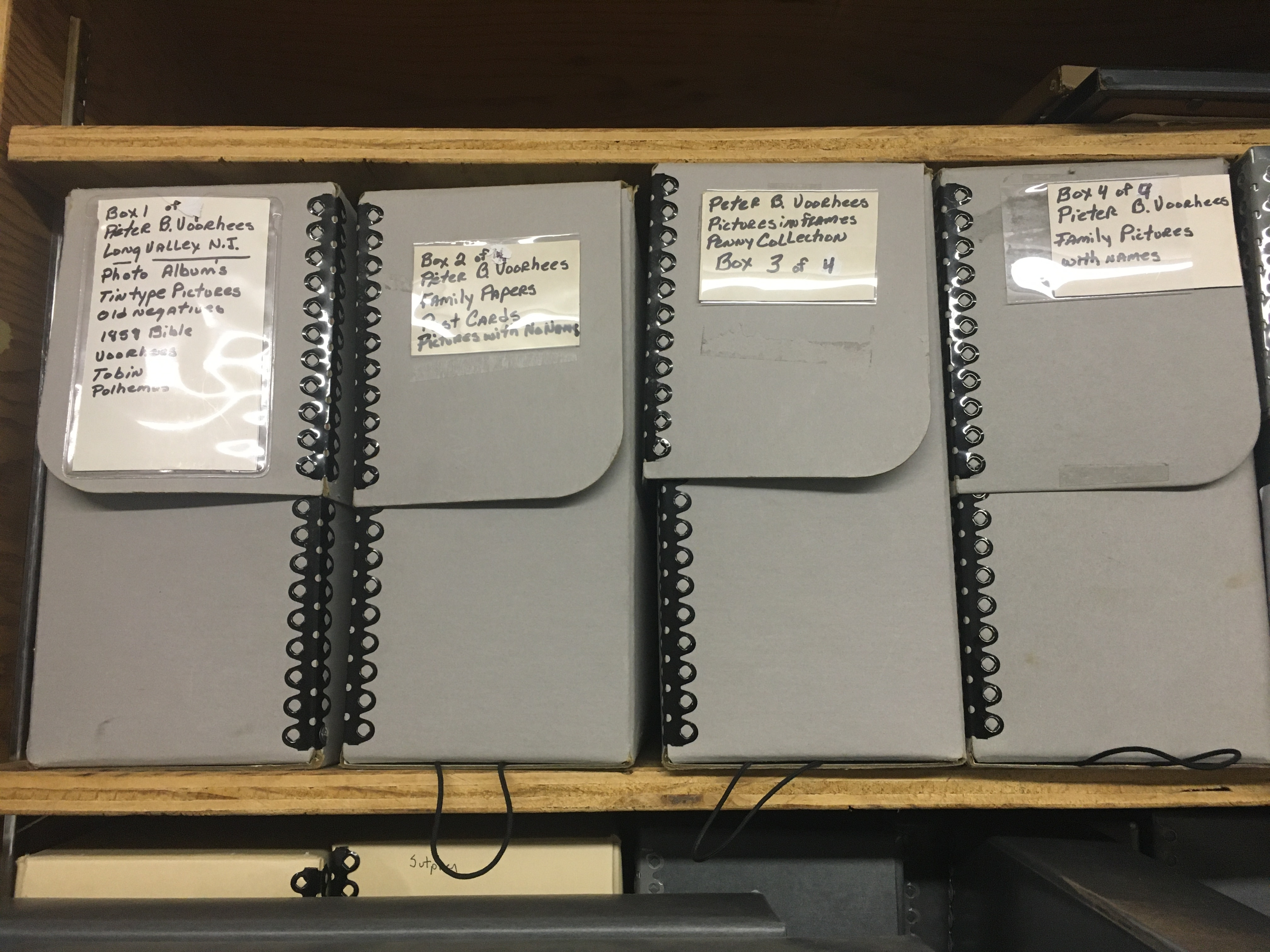
Archival materials in the collection of the Somerset County Historical Society, New Jersey, 2021

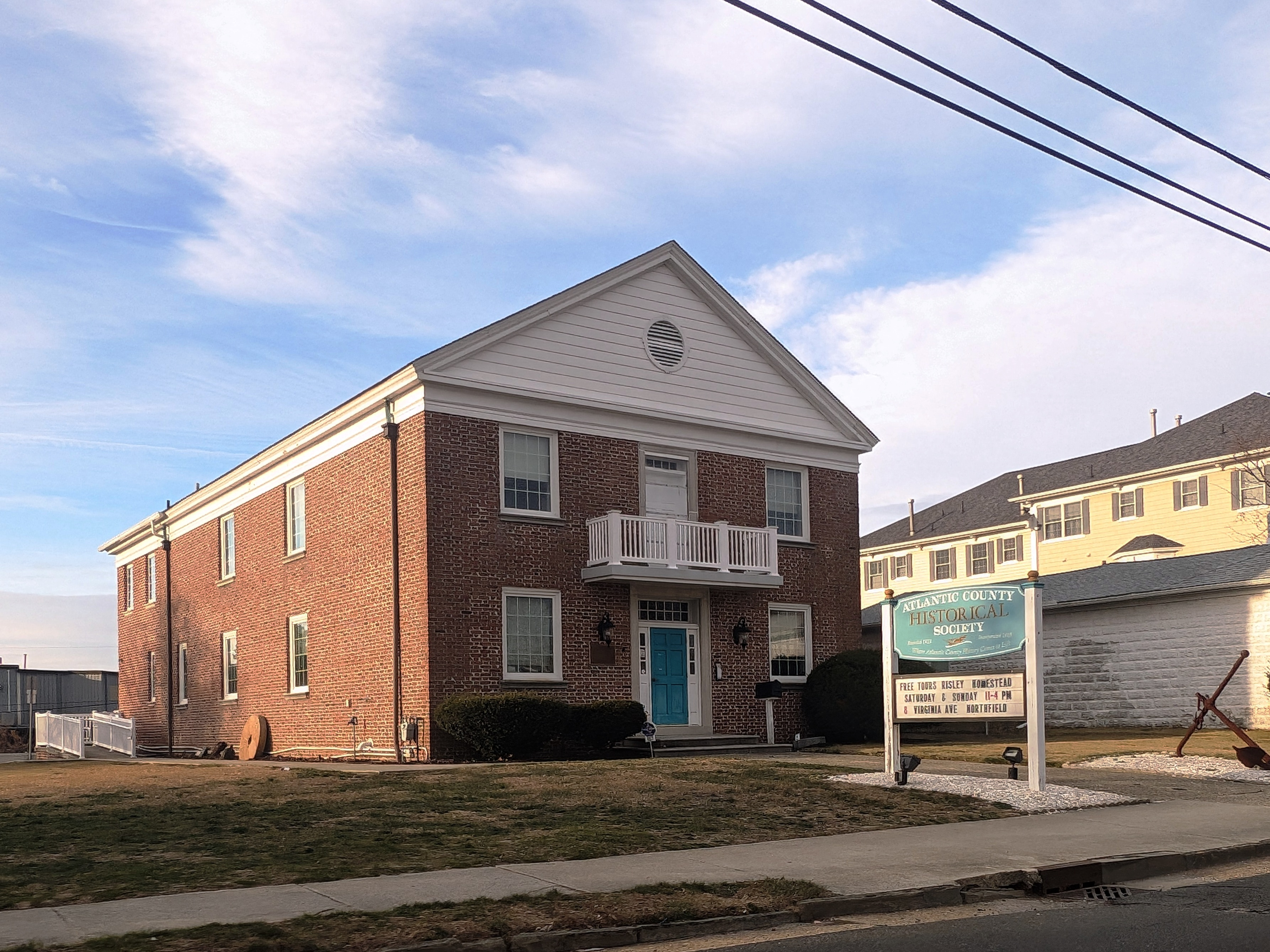
Atlantic County Historical Society building and sign in Somers Point, New Jersey (photo 2024)

Cover of the Charter, By-Laws and Membership Roster of the Camden County Historical Society, New Jersey, 1922

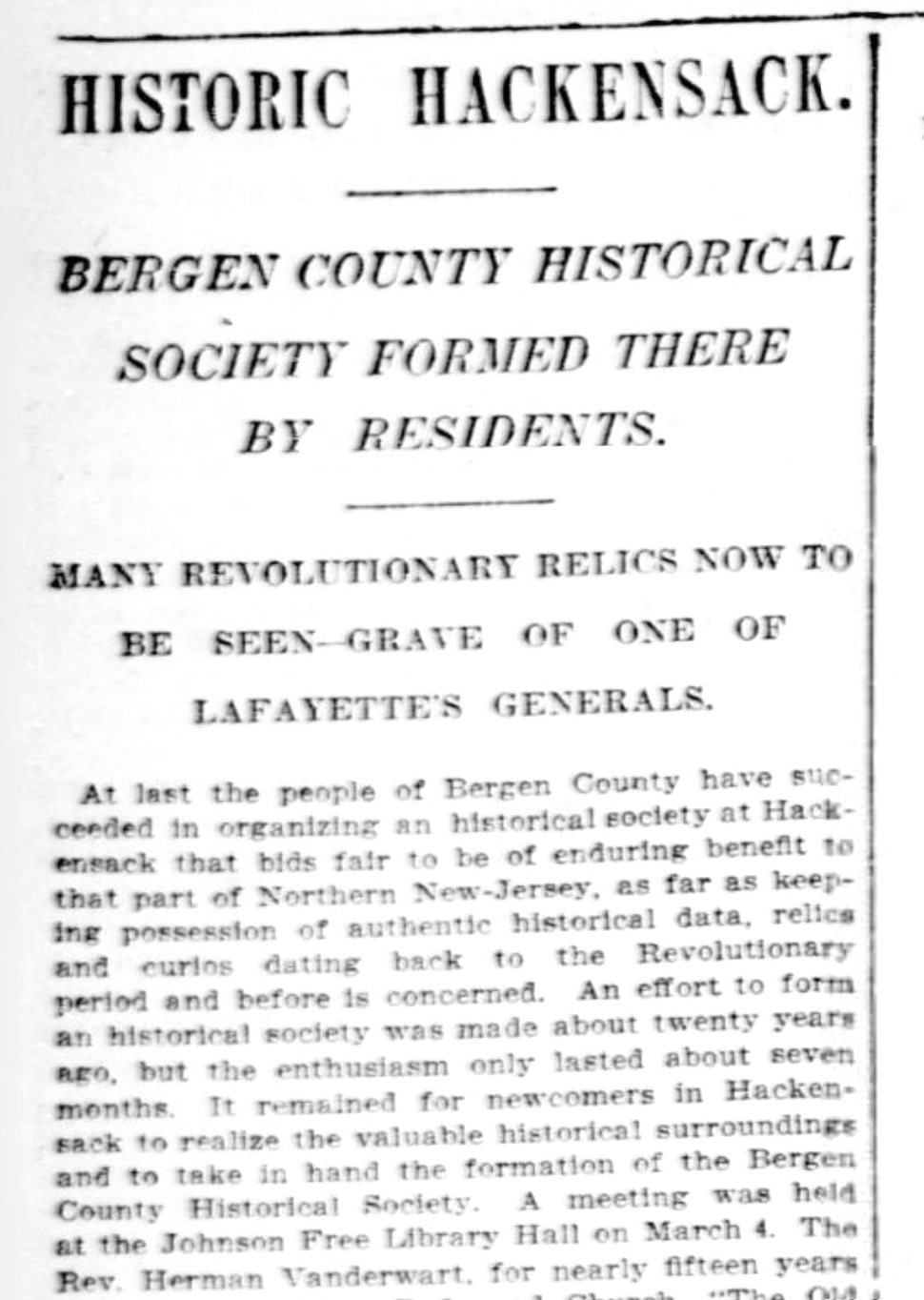
1902 newspaper item about the Bergen County Historical Society, New Jersey

== See also ==
- History of New Jersey
- List of museums in New Jersey
- National Register of Historic Places listings in New Jersey
- List of historical societies in the United States
