= Bess Bower Dunn Museum =

- Location within Illinois
- Established: 1976
- Location: 1899 W Winchester Rd, Libertyville, IL 60048
- Coordinates: 42.2626°N 88.1068°W
- Type: History Museum
- Visitors: 45,000 per year
- Parking: On site (no charge)
- Website: www.lcfpd.org/museum/

Bess Bower Dunn Museum, formerly known as the Lake County Discovery Museum, is an interactive museum of history, art, and popular culture located in Libertyville, Illinois. The museum was established in 1976 in Wauconda, IL and sited in Lakewood Forest Preserve as part of the larger Lake County Forest Preserve District. It was later moved to Libertyville, IL and renamed the Bess Bower Dunn Museum. The museum is dedicated to sharing the entwined stories of people, events and nature through exhibitions, education and community engagement in Lake County, Illinois.

== History ==
Originally a group of pre-American Civil War farm properties, the land and buildings that surrounded the original museum location in Wauconda were part of the Lakewood Farms, an estate created after 1937 by Chicago contractor Malcolm Boyle. Boyle acquired area plots over time, gradually erecting seventeen structures which briefly served as a working dairy farm, and later served as offices, libraries, storage, exhibit and gallery spaces for the museum and its collections.

Friends of the Lake County Discovery Museum began gathering support in 1971 and after the Farms complex was acquired, the museum was launched in 1976. Six years later the donation of the Curt Teich Postcard Archives brought five semi-truck trailers of postcards and related files to the museum. As the museum's collections and archives continued to grow, the museum moved to new, larger facility which it shares with Preserve District offices in Libertyville.

== Collections ==
=== Lake County History Archive ===
The Dunn Museum's collections, which comprise nearly 20,000 artifacts and 1,000 linear feet of archival materials, are securely housed in a modern environmentally controlled care and storage facility. Irreplaceable collections held in public trust are protected with precise temperature and humidity control, as well as security and fire suppression capabilities, preserving Lake County's cultural heritage for future generations to discover and enjoy. Archival holdings within the museum's distinguished collections can be accessed by appointment by visitors, researchers and history enthusiasts. Artifacts from the collections are showcased in exhibitions and education programs.

The museum hosts Lake County History Archives (including archives of other conservation areas like Ryerson Woods), a collection on nearby Fort Sheridan (a former U.S. Army base nearby) and records of a Lake County-based American Civil War regiment of Illinois troops, the 96th Illinois Volunteer Infantry Regiment. The archives also holds the Amet/Essany Studios Collection, covering the career and works of Waukegan native Edward Amet, a pioneer in 35mm motion picture projection. In addition to a compilation of Lake County one-room school narratives, the museum also preserves a selection of materials relating to Zion, Illinois social and civic organization for minorities, the Booker T. Washington Club.

=== Curt Teich Postcard Archives ===
When the museum was in Wauconda, it hosted the largest public collection of postcards in the U.S., the Curt Teich Postcard Archives. Curt Teich and Company was a Chicago-based printer of postcards, posters, stationery, and maps from its establishment in 1898 until its sale in 1978. The company produced millions of images in the postcard form, and kept reference copies of each image, along with original production notes and materials. During World War II, Curt Teich and Company produced over three million maps for the U.S. Army map service, including 100% of all invasion maps produced. After the business was sold, son Ralph Teich donated the entire Teich collection, contained in five semi-truck trailers to the new Discovery Museum. In 2016, the postcard collection was transferred to the Newberry Library.

== Exhibitions ==
In addition to permanent exhibitions, the museum regularly hosts special exhibitions.

- A gallery on fossil life of Lake County such as mammoth fossils, also featuring a life-sized model of Dryptosaurus created by Chicago paleoartist Tyler Keillor.
- A gallery for indigenous cultures of the area, featuring a replica of a wigwam.

Recent exhibitions have included a gallery of Ansel Adams photography and the Blues musical form.
