= Israel Crane =

- Born: March 15, 1774; Montclair, New Jersey, US
- Died: March 20, 1858 (Age 84)
- Occupation: Merchant
- Known for: Crane House and Historic YWCA

Israel Crane (March 15, 1774 – March 20, 1858) was an American merchant who lived in Cranetown (modern-day Montclair), New Jersey. He was the only child to Matthias and Elizabeth Crane.

== Business ventures ==
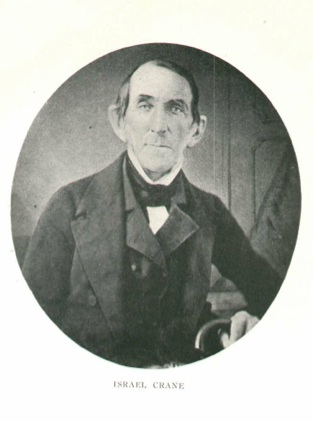
Israel Crane

Israel Crane (nicknamed "King" Crane for his successes) was originally a businessman, and operated a general store on the corner of what is now Glen Ridge Avenue and Lackawanna Plaza in what was then Cranetown. The store sold hardware, dry goods, paint, and many other items that were needed by local farmers. Most bargaining was conducted in the Dutch language, and once the deal was sealed they celebrated with Jersey cider or peach brandy. He was considered to be the wealthiest man in his area. Crane also headed the Morris Canal. In addition, Crane was president of the Newark and Bloomfield Turnpike (now known as the Newark-Pompton Turnpike) Company, founded in 1806. By 1808, what is now Bloomfield Avenue reached through Caldwell. These business ventures were passed down to Crane's youngest son, James.

== Personal life ==
Israel's father Matthias was a Revolutionary War veteran who died when Israel was 12 years old. He spent much of his life wanting to be a minister but had to dropout of Princeton due to issues with his health. He married Fanny Pierson, the daughter of a prominent doctor in Orange, NJ, in 1796. They had seven children, two of whom passed before the age of eight due to illnesses not yet treatable through medicine.

== Legacy ==
Crane's residence, the Crane House and Historic YWCA, still stands today, albeit in a different location than its original site. The House is available to tour through the Montclair History Center. In addition, his family name is still seen on Montclair's town crest.
