= Portia Gage =

American activist and suffragist

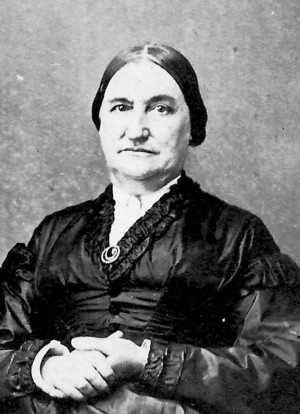
- Cage c. 1868

Personal details
- Born: March 15, 1813 Manlius, New York, U.S.
- Died: February 23, 1903 Vineland, New Jersey, U.S.
- Resting place: Siloam Cemetery, Vineland, New Jersey

Portia Gage (March 15, 1813 – February 23, 1903) was an American activist and suffragist. As an organizer with the New Jersey Woman Suffrage Movement, she led demonstrations in which she and other women attempted to cast ballots in local and national elections despite not having the right to vote. Her largest protest encouraged other women across the country to lead their own demonstrations and revived the suffrage movement at the national level.

== Early life ==
Portia Gage was born on March 15, 1813, in Manlius, New York to Leonard and Sallie French Kellog. Because she had to work starting at the age of twelve, she was never able to advance her education. At the age of seventeen, Portia met and married John Gage. In 1836, she and John moved their family to Chicago so that John could begin his career as a flour miller. After making a fortune in Chicago, they moved to Vineland, New Jersey and quickly became leaders in the small community. Although John did most of the work while Portia raised their eleven children, she would later become involved in a variety of causes, especially the suffrage movement.

== Activism ==
Portia began her activism by listening to and learning from local women. Abbie Leavitt and Susan Fowler were a few of the local women she learned from. Others included prominent suffragists such as Lucy Stone and her husband Henry Blackwell. On December 4, 1866, Lucy and Henry spoke to a packed audience at Vineland’s Plum Street Hall about equal rights for women. Their talk inspired the founding of an Equal Rights Association which actively supported suffrage. This sparked momentum for the movement and a year later Portia would attend the first convention of the New Jersey Woman Suffrage Association in November of 1867. She would go on to be the president of the association from 1868 to 1871.

During a local election in March of 1868, Portia tried to cast a ballot. She was politely denied the right to do so on the grounds that she was not registered to vote. A few days after that election, she wrote to a friend: “I was induced to offer a vote first, because I felt it a duty, and second, out of curiosity. I wanted to know how men did behave at the polls. I feel stronger, wiser and better for having come in contact with the political influence of last Tuesday at the polls. My fears were groundless, as the men whom I there met were quiet and well behaved, and treated me as respectfully as though I were in a Church or lecture room. Of course I felt somewhat embarrassed, being the only woman in the room, but I walked through being kindly greeted by some, not “jostled” or molested by any.”

Several months after her first attempt at voting, on October 15, 1868, a large group of women met in the Union Hall on Railroad Boulevard and decided they would go to the polls on November 3 and attempt to vote in the first presidential election held after the Civil War. Portia gathered together 171 women and on election day arrived at Union Hall as the men were voting. The men, although supportive, told the women they could not vote because they were not legally registered and therefore could not use the official ballot box. The women, however, had come with their own table, ballot, and hand-made ballot box.

Although they were not able to vote, this was the first time in America that so many women had turned out at one time to support suffrage efforts. Their protest was featured in the Revolution, a feminist publication, and inspired many women to host their own demonstrations. This led to the movement reaching the national level.

== Death ==
Portia died on February 23, 1903.
