= Siloam Cemetery =

Cemetery in Vineland, New Jersey, US

- U.S. National Register of Historic Places
- U.S. Historic district
- New Jersey Register of Historic Places
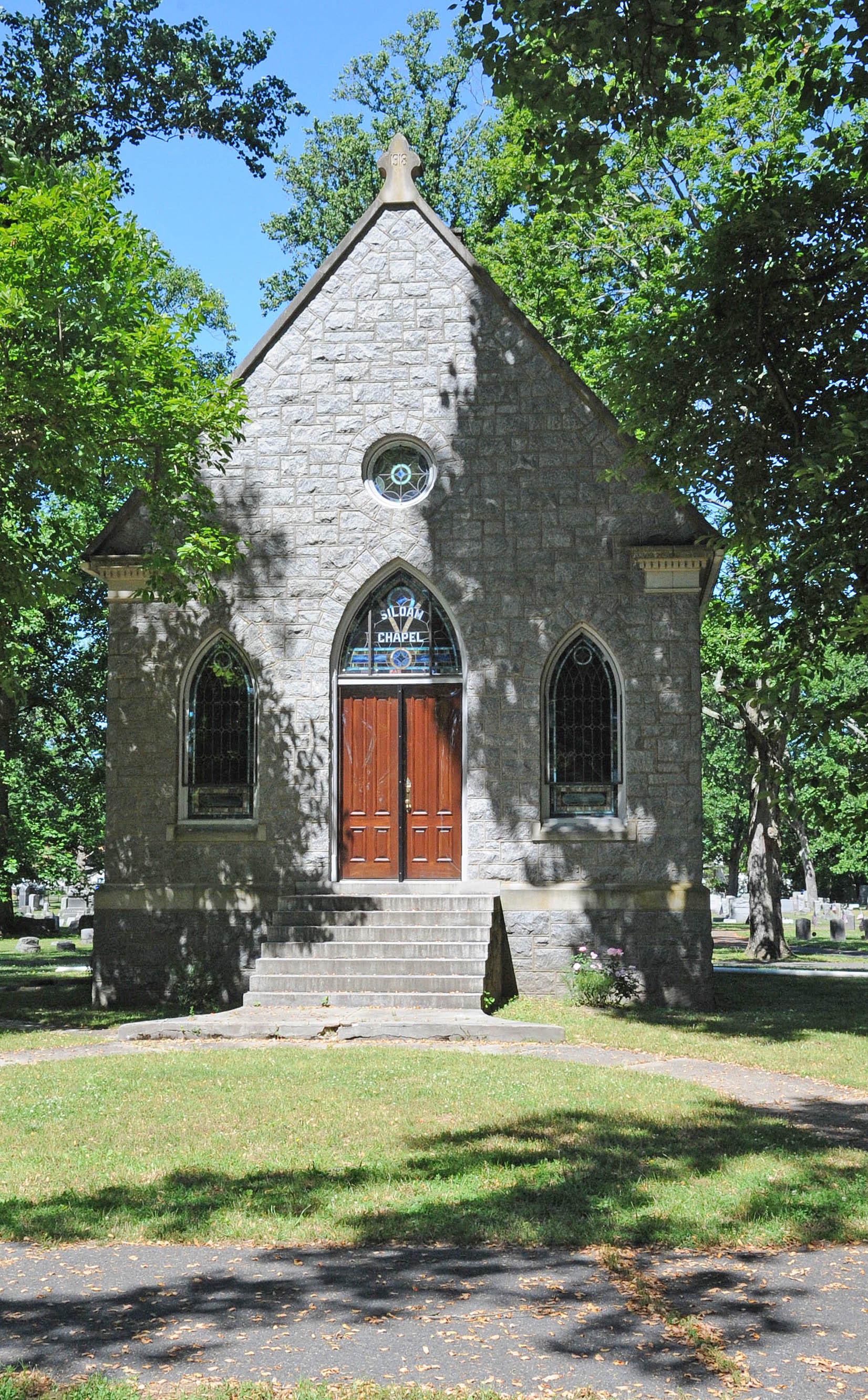
- Siloam Chapel

- Location within Cumberland County, New Jersey Location within New Jersey Location within the United States
- Location: 550 North Valley Avenue; Vineland, New Jersey
- Area: 14.4 acres (5.8 ha)
- Architect: H.M. Holbrook
- Architectural style: Gothic Revival
- NRHP reference No.: 100005155
- NJRHP No.: 5451

Significant dates
- Added to NRHP: April 3, 2020
- Designated NJRHP: August 12, 2019

Siloam Cemetery is the oldest cemetery in the city of Vineland in Cumberland County, New Jersey, United States. It was listed on the National Register of Historic Places on April 3, 2020, for its significance in architecture and landscape architecture.

The cemetery, located at 550 North Valley Avenue, was established in 1864 on a plot of land donated by Charles K. Landis, the founder of Vineland. A chapel was constructed in 1918 and features Gothic Revival architecture. It is located in the center of one of the original sections of the cemetery. Many local residents, some of whom were nationally prominent, are buried there.

Many of Kuban Cossacks exiled from Russian Empire after revolution and settled in Vineland around 1930-1940 are buried in this cemetery. Some of their graves are marked in Cyrillic alphabet also indicating their Cossack army ranks and medals.

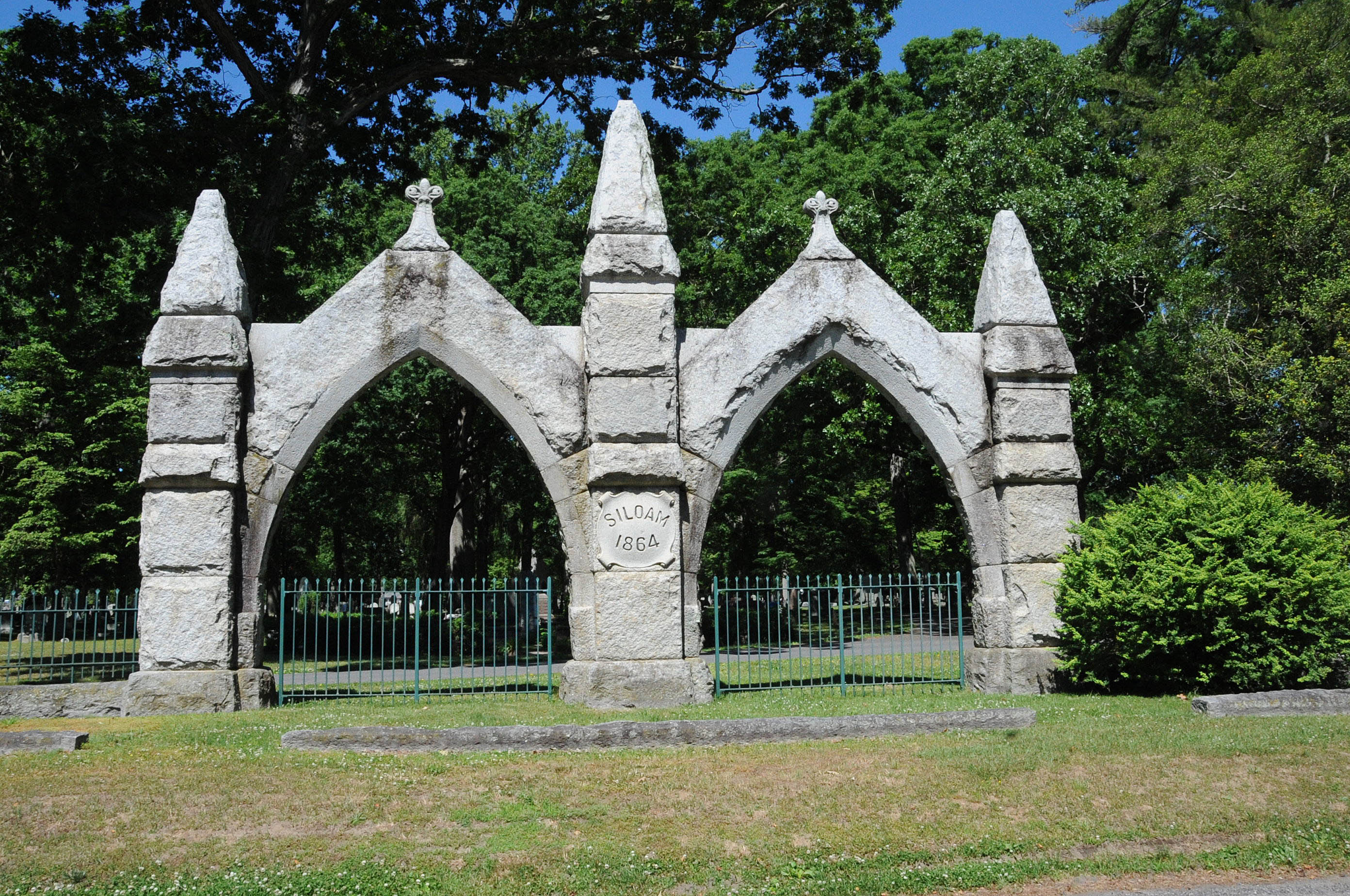
Gothic arches

== Notable interments ==
- Henry Herbert Goddard (1866–1957), researcher at Vineland Training School
- Charles K. Landis (1833–1900), founder of Vineland, an attorney, author, and real estate developer
- Jeanette DuBois Meech (1835–1911), evangelist and industrial educator
- Thelma Parkinson (1898–1983), politician, candidate for 1930 special election for the United States Senate, member of the New Jersey State Board of Tax Appeals, member (and later president) of the New Jersey Civil Service Commission 1954 to 1970.
- Mary Treat (1831?–1923), a naturalist who corresponded with Charles Darwin
- Thomas Bramwell Welch (1825–1903), developer of Welch's grape juice.
- Portia Gage (1813-1903), organizer with Women's suffrage in New Jersey.
- Inman Sealby (1862-1942), last captain of RMS Republic

== See also ==
- National Register of Historic Places listings in Cumberland County, New Jersey
