= Methyl anthranilate =

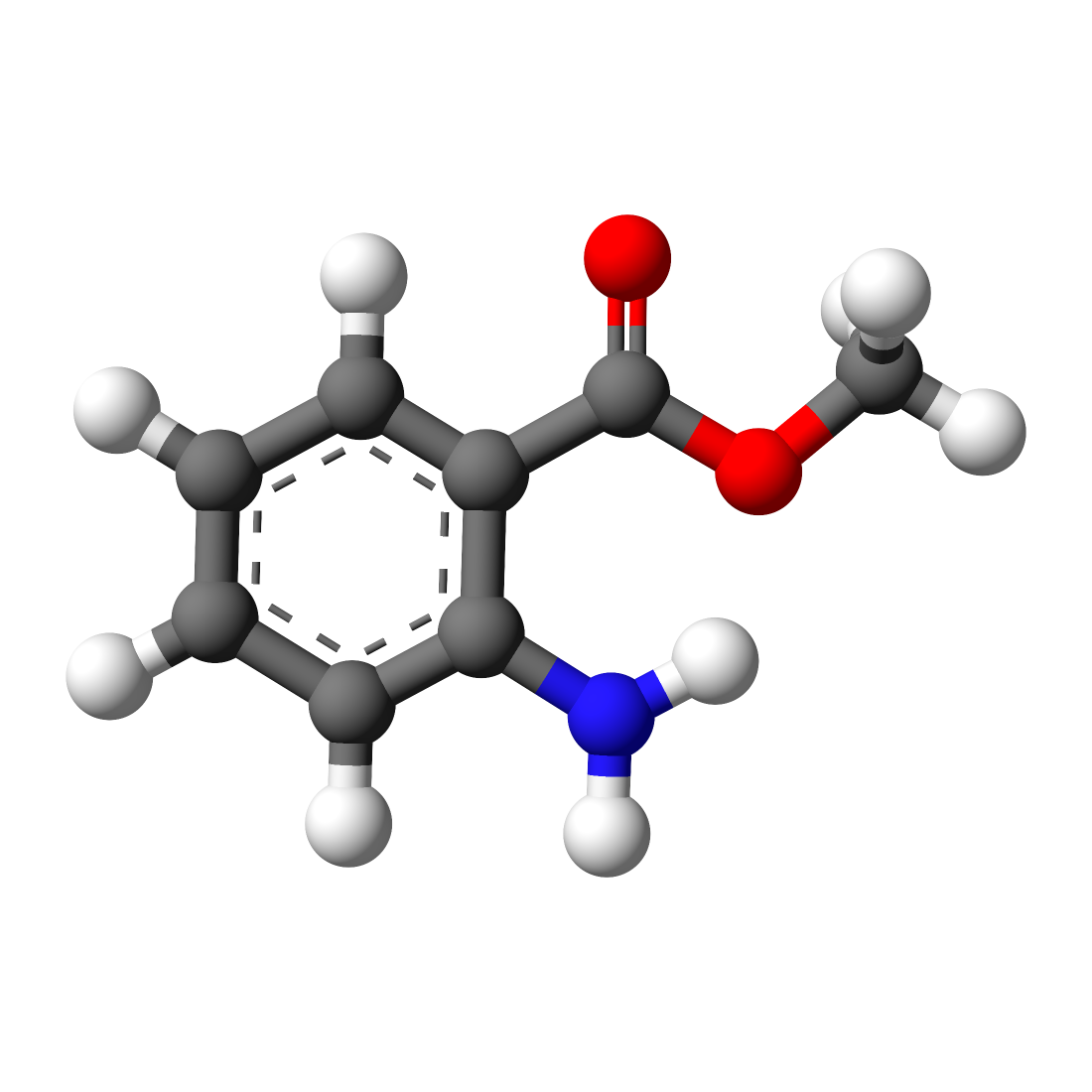

Names
- Preferred IUPAC name Methyl 2-aminobenzoate

Identifiers
CAS Number	134-20-3
3D model (JSmol)	Interactive image
ChEBI	CHEBI:73244
ChEMBL	ChEMBL1493986
ChemSpider	13858096
ECHA InfoCard	100.004.667
EC Number	205-132-4
KEGG	C20634
PubChem CID	8635
UNII	981I0C1E5W
CompTox Dashboard (EPA)	DTXSID6025567
- InChI: InChI=1S/C8H9NO2/c1-11-8(10)6-4-2-3-5-7(6)9/h2-5H,9H2,1H3 Key: VAMXMNNIEUEQDV-UHFFFAOYSA-N; InChI=1/C8H9NO2/c1-11-8(10)6-4-2-3-5-7(6)9/h2-5H,9H2,1H3 Key: VAMXMNNIEUEQDV-UHFFFAOYAV
- SMILES: COC(=O)c1c(N)cccc1

Properties
Chemical formula	C_{8}H_{9}NO_{2}
Molar mass	151.165
Appearance	colorless liquid
Odor	grape-like
Density	1.168 g/cm^{3}
Melting point	24 °C (75 °F; 297 K)
Boiling point	256 °C (493 °F; 529 K)
Solubility in water	Very slight
Solubility in ethanol	Soluble
Solubility in propylene glycol	Soluble
Solubility in mineral oil	Insoluble
Refractive index (n_{D})	1.583 (589 nm at 20 °C)

Hazards
- GHS labelling
Pictograms	(GHS07: Exclamation mark)
Signal word	Warning
Hazard statements	H319
Precautionary statements	P264, P280, P305+P351+P338, P337+P313
Flash point	104 °C (219 °F; 377 K)
- Except where otherwise noted, data are given for materials in their standard state (at 25 °C [77 °F], 100 kPa). verify (what is ?) Infobox references

Methyl anthranilate, also known as MA, methyl 2-aminobenzoate, or carbomethoxyaniline, is an ester of anthranilic acid. Its chemical formula is C_{8}H_{9}NO_{2}. It has a strong and fruity grape smell, and one of its key uses is as a flavoring agent.

== Physical properties ==
Methyl anthranilate has a light blue-violet fluorescence. The pure substance has a fruity grape smell; at 25 ppm it has a sweet, fruity, Concord grape-like smell with a musty and berry nuance.

== Uses ==
Methyl anthranilate acts as a bird repellent by irritating sensory receptors. Dimethyl anthranilate has a similar effect.

It is also used for part of the flavor of grape Kool-Aid. It is used for flavoring of candy, soft drinks (e.g. grape soda), fruit (e.g. Grāpples), chewing gum, and nicotine products. Its characteristic blue fluorecence can lead to mis-analysis of products containing it as containing other banned fluorescent dyes.

=== Schiff bases in perfumery ===
Methyl anthranilate is one of the two amines most commonly used to form Schiff bases in the fragrance industry, the other being ethyl anthranilate. When methyl anthranilate reacts with an aldehyde, water is released and a single, heavier compound is formed. These compounds are typically yellow-to-orange, viscous liquids that are more stable than their parent aldehydes and have greater tenacity, or staying power, on skin, though they darken over time.

Several methyl anthranilate-based Schiff bases are sold under trade names and are widely used across the fragrance industry, such as:

Aurantiol
Formed with hydroxycitronellal, has an orange blossom and neroli character and is described as the most widely used Schiff base in perfumery.. It was discovered in 1908 and its first use in a commercial fragrance was Guerlain L'Heure Bleue (1912).
Verdantiol (also sold as Lilyantine)
Formed with Lilial, has a linden blossom character with orange blossom undertones.
Lyrame (also sold as Lyrantion)
Formed with the aldehyde Lyral, has a fresh lily-of-the-valley character with notes of orange blossom.
Helioforte
Formed with Helional, has a marine, almondy character and was developed by the Florasynth company.
Vertosine (also sold as Ligantraal, Agrumea)
A Schiff base of methyl anthranilate and Triplal; noted by Calkin and Jellinek in the early 1990s as a comparatively recent addition to the category.
A Schiff-base with Trifernal® (3-Phenylbutanal)
This is in the patent literature.

Perfumers can also add methyl anthranilate as a plain, separate ingredient alongside an aldehyde such as hydroxycitronellal, Lyral, or Helional, allowing the Schiff base to form gradually inside the finished compound over a period of weeks or months, in a process known as maceration. This gradual reaction continues even after a perfume has been bottled; perfumery analysts note that older samples may show Schiff bases that were not present when the fragrance was originally formulated, which complicates efforts to determine an exact original formula from chemical analysis alone. Unintended post-bottling formation can also change a finished fragrance's scent: perfumer Paul Kiler has pointed to Roja Parfums Enigma Pour Homme (2013, sold as Creation-E in the United States) as a case in which a Schiff base formed between methyl anthranilate and vanillin roughly a year after bottling, darkening the fragrance and giving it an unintended root beer-like note.

Although once widely used, Schiff bases have become less common in modern perfumery, in part because of the strong color many of them produce.

== Occurrence ==
Methyl anthranilate naturally occurs in the Concord grapes and other Vitis labrusca grapes and hybrids thereof, and in bergamot, black locust, champak, gardenia, jasmine, lemon, mandarin orange, neroli, oranges, rue oil, strawberry, tuberose, wisteria, galangal, and ylang ylang. It is also a primary component of the essential apple flavor, along with ethyl acetate and ethyl butyrate.
