= Grape drink =

Sweetened grape-flavor deep purple drink

Grape drinks (also known as grape soda, grape pop, or purple drink in certain regions of the U.S.) are sweetened drinks with a grape flavor and a deep purple color. They may be carbonated (e.g., Fanta) or not (e.g., Kool-Aid).

Grapeade first appeared as a variety of carbonated drink provided in soda fountains in American drugstores in the late nineteenth century, brands including Miner's and Lash's. A recipe for homemade grapeade appears in editions of Fannie Farmer's cookbook.

Today, most commercially available grape sodas are based on artificial flavorings such as methyl anthranilate designed to simulate Concord grapes, and are colored deep purple with food coloring. Methyl anthranilate naturally occurs in the Concord grapes and other Vitis labrusca grapes and hybrids thereof, and in bergamot, black locust, champak, gardenia, jasmine, lemon, mandarin orange, neroli, oranges, rue oil, strawberry, tuberose, wisteria, galangal, and ylang ylang, but synthetic versions are used more often to ensure product consistency.

Hard grape sodas have been marketed by, e.g., Henry's Hard Soda. It is also possible to use non-alcoholic grape sodas in alcoholic cocktails, such as a grape soda whiskey cocktail, or frozen grape daiquiri.

== See also ==
- List of brand name soft drinks products
- List of soft drink flavors
- List of soft drink producers
- List of soft drinks by country
- Stereotypes of African Americans
