= Thomas Bramwell Welch =

Methodist minister, dentist and businessman

- Born: 31 December 1825; Glastonbury, England
- Died: 29 December 1903 (aged 77); Vineland, New Jersey, U.S.
- Resting place: Siloam Cemetery
- Education: Gouverneur Wesleyan Seminary; New York Central College
- Spouse(s): Victoria C. Sherbume (m. 1895); Lucy Hult
- Children: Charles E. Welch, dentist Emma C. Welch Slade (1854–1928), dentist
- Parent(s): Abraham Welch; Mary Fussel

Thomas Bramwell Welch (31 December 1825 – 29 December 1903) was a British–American Methodist minister and dentist. He pioneered the use of pasteurization as a means of preventing the fermentation of grape juice. He persuaded local churches to adopt this non-alcoholic wine substitute for use in Holy Communion, calling it "Dr. Welch's Unfermented Wine". The company he founded is now called Welch's, which produces grape juices, jams and jellies.

== Early life ==
Welch was born in Glastonbury, England, on 31 December 1825. He moved to the United States when his father emigrated in 1834. He attended public schools in Watertown, New York.

== Wesleyan Methodist Church ==
At age 17, Thomas Welch joined the Wesleyan Methodist Connexion, founded the same year (1843). From its beginning, the Wesleyan Methodist Connexion strongly opposed the "manufacturing, buying, selling, or using intoxicating liquors", and "slaveholding, buying, or selling" of slaves.

With the first edition of their Discipline, the Wesleyan Methodists expressly required for the Eucharist (Communion) that "unfermented wine only should be used at the sacrament." This requirement was about 25 years before Welch used pasteurization, so it is evident that pasteurization was not the only method used to prepare it unfermented. There were traditional methods to prepare unfermented wine (juice) for use at any time during the year, e.g. to reconstitute concentrated grape juice, or to boil raisins, or to add preservatives that prevent juice from fermenting and souring.

Throughout his late teens, Welch was active in the Underground Railroad that transported escaped slaves from the south into Canada. He was one of many Wesleyan Methodists connected to the Underground Railroad.

By age 19, he had graduated from Gouverneur Wesleyan Seminary, and become an ordained Wesleyan Methodist minister. He ministered first in Pound Ridge, in Westchester County, New York, then in Herkimer County, New York.

Welch continued in the work of ministry until his voice failed him, and he was obliged to direct his attention to other pursuits.

== Post-church career ==
Welch attended New York Central Medical College (Syracuse campus), becoming a physician in Penn Yan, New York. In 1856, he moved to Winona, Minnesota, where he opened a drugstore and advertised himself as a surgeon-dentist. He was elected to the Winona Public School Board in 1862. The next year he opened a larger office in Winona equipped to make customized "artificial teeth on Vulcanized rubber plates" and offered to provide lodging to patients who travelled there.

=== Juice ===
In 1864, the General Conference of the Methodist Episcopal Church expressly recommended that "in all cases the pure juice of the grape be used in the celebration of the Lord's Supper." In 1865, Welch relocated to Vineland, New Jersey, where a sister already resided, and became a member of Vineland Methodist Episcopal Church, where he served as a communion steward. Then in 1869, Welch invented a method of pasteurizing grape juice so that fermentation was stopped, and the drink was non-alcoholic. He persuaded local churches to adopt this non-alcoholic wine for communion services, calling it "Dr. Welch's Unfermented Wine."

=== Continued career and pursuits ===
He continued to practice dentistry in Vineland until 1880 and "enjoyed a very successful and lucrative practice through the entire time." Welch was a staunch Prohibitionist, who actively worked to reduce or end the sale of alcoholic beverages in New Jersey and adjacent regions.

His son, Charles E. Welch, also a dentist, returned to Vineland, New Jersey, in 1875 and later relocated his dental practice to Vineland. By this time, Thomas was a successful Prohibition crusader and had "all but abandoned" attention to his old experiments. He advised Charles, "Now don't think I'm trying to discourage your pushing the grape juice. It is right for you to do so, so far as you can, without interfering with your profession and your health." Charles and Thomas Welch founded the Welch's Dental Supply Company in Philadelphia and began a dentistry journal. Charles promoted the sale and consumption of grape juice. The Welches sold grape juice as a sideline. The industry had grown slowly until 1890. So from 1890, the Welches were able to spend more attention on the industry. Charles did not devote full attention to marketing grape juice until 1893, when Welch's Grape Juice Company was "officially launched". However, Thomas Welch himself "never received a penny in return for his investment."

== Personal life and death ==
While in Herkimer County, he married Miss Lucy Hult. They had seven children. The children included Charles E. Welch, who became a dentist and was very involved in the grape juice business, and Emma C. Welch Slade (1854–1928) who also became a dentist.

After the death of his first wife, Thomas Welch married Miss Victoria C. Sherbume in 1895.

On 29 December 1903, Thomas Welch died in Vineland, New Jersey. He was buried in its Siloam Cemetery.
