= Diamond Beach, New Jersey =

Populated place in Cape May County, New Jersey, US

- Census-designated place
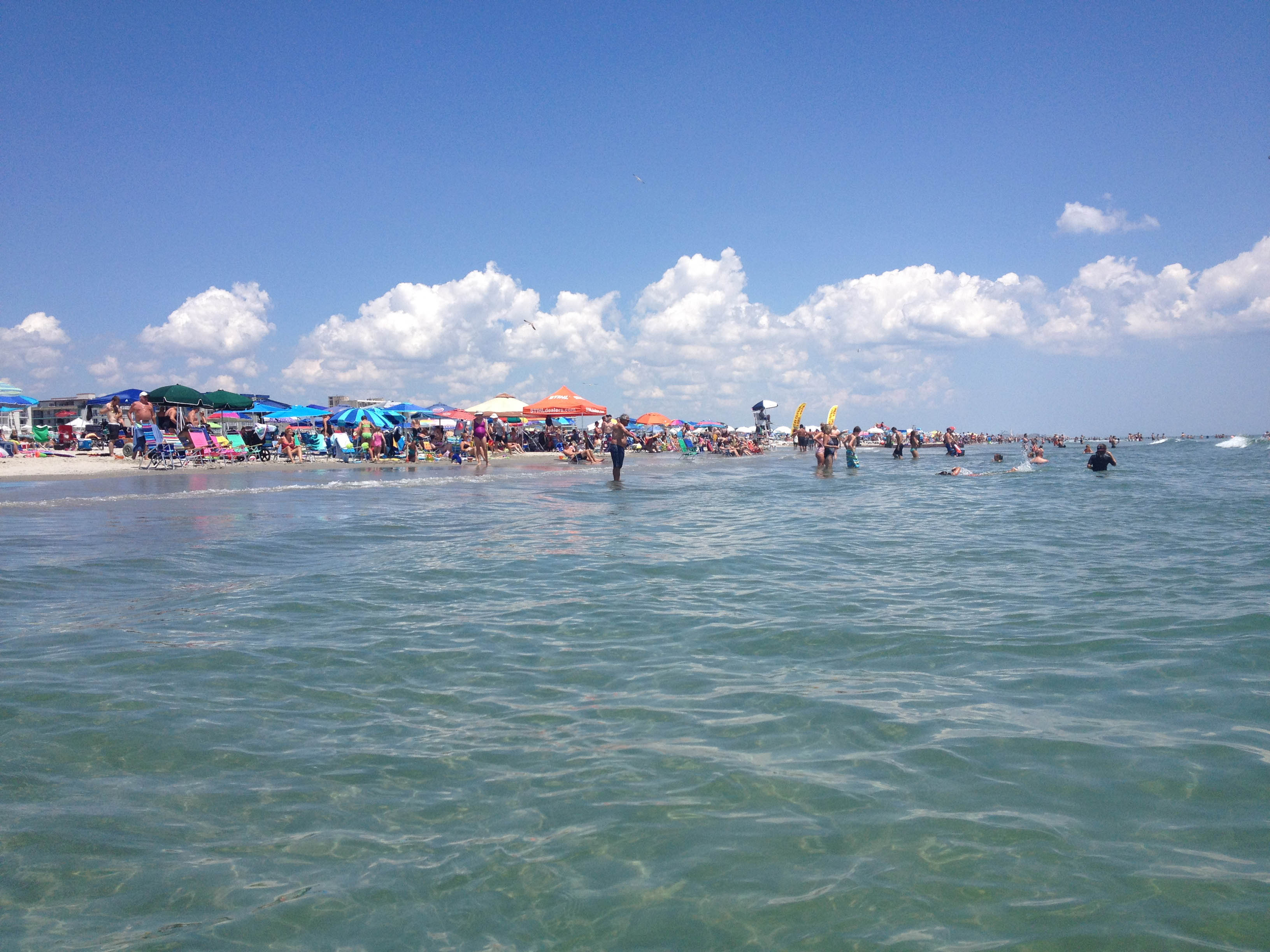
- Diamond Beach in 2015

- Map of Diamond Beach CDP in Cape May County

- Location in Cape May County Location in New Jersey Location in the United States
- Coordinates: 38.958852°N 74.852009°W
- Country: United States
- State: New Jersey
- County: Cape May
- Township: Lower

Area
  - Total: 0.23 sq mi (0.59 km^{2})
  - Land: 0.23 sq mi (0.59 km^{2})
  - Water: 0 sq mi (0.00 km^{2}) 0.00%
- Elevation: 6.6 ft (2 m)

Population (2020)
  - Total: 203
  - Density: 898/sq mi (346.8/km^{2})
- Time zone: UTC−05:00 (Eastern (EST))
  - Summer (DST): UTC−04:00 (Eastern (EDT))
- Area code: 609
- FIPS code: 34-17815
- GNIS feature ID: 02389406

Diamond Beach is an unincorporated community and census-designated place (CDP) located within Lower Township in Cape May County, in the U.S. state of New Jersey. The CDP, and all of Cape May County, is part of the Ocean City metropolitan statistical area, and is part of the Philadelphia metropolitan area. As of the United States 2020 Census, the CDP's population was 203, an increase of 67 from the 2010 census count of 136.

== Geography ==
According to the United States Census Bureau, Diamond Beach had a total area of 0.157 square miles (0.41 km^{2}), all of which was land.

Diamond Beach is home to many upscale townhouses and Seapointe Village, the site of a police substation that opened in 2013.

== Demographics ==
Historical population
Census	Pop.	Note	%±
2000	218		—
2010	136		−37.6%
2020	203		49.3%
Population sources: 2000 2010 2020

Diamond Beach first appeared as a census designated place in the 2000 U.S. census.

=== 2020 census ===
Diamond Beach CDP, New Jersey – Racial and ethnic composition Note: the US Census treats Hispanic/Latino as an ethnic category. This table excludes Latinos from the racial categories and assigns them to a separate category. Hispanics/Latinos may be of any race.
Race / Ethnicity (NH = Non-Hispanic)	Pop 2000	Pop 2010	Pop 2020	% 2000	% 2010	% 2020
White alone (NH)	207	136	192	94.95%	100.00%	94.58%
Black or African American alone (NH)	5	0	0	2.29%	0.00%	0.00%
Native American or Alaska Native alone (NH)	0	0	0	0.00%	0.00%	0.00%
Asian alone (NH)	2	0	0	0.92%	0.00%	0.00%
Native Hawaiian or Pacific Islander alone (NH)	0	0	0	0.00%	0.00%	0.00%
Other race alone (NH)	0	0	0	0.00%	0.00%	0.00%
Mixed race or Multiracial (NH)	1	0	3	0.46%	0.00%	1.48%
Hispanic or Latino (any race)	3	0	8	1.38%	0.00%	3.94%
Total	218	136	203	100.00%	100.00%	100.00%

=== 2010 census ===
The 2010 United States census counted 136 people, 71 households, and 46 families in the CDP. The population density was 868.4 people per square mile (335.3 people/km^{2}). There were 845 housing units at an average density of 5,395.7 units per square mile (2,083.3 units/km^{2}). The racial makeup was 100.00% (136) White, 0.00% (0) Black or African American, 0.00% (0) Native American, 0.00% (0) Asian, 0.00% (0) Pacific Islander, 0.00% (0) from other races, and 0.00% (0) from two or more races. Hispanic or Latino of any race were 0.00% (0) of the population.

Of the 71 households, 9.9% had children under the age of 18; 57.7% were married couples living together; 2.8% had a female householder with no husband present and 35.2% were non-families. Of all households, 31.0% were made up of individuals and 8.5% had someone living alone who was 65 years of age or older. The average household size was 1.92 and the average family size was 2.28.

6.6% of the population were under the age of 18, 2.2% from 18 to 24, 11.8% from 25 to 44, 42.6% from 45 to 64, and 36.8% who were 65 years of age or older. The median age was 60.4 years. For every 100 females, the population had 94.3 males. For every 100 females ages 18 and older there were 86.8 males.

=== 2000 census ===
As of the 2000 United States census there were 218 people, 103 households, and 73 families residing in the place. The population density was 526.1 people/km^{2} (1,363 people/mi^{2}). There were 1,017 housing units at an average density of 2,454.2 units/km^{2} (6,356 units/mi^{2}). The racial makeup of the CDP was 96.33% White, 2.29% African American, 0.92% Asian, and 0.46% from two or more races. Hispanic or Latino of any race were 1.38% of the population.

There were 103 households, out of which 16.5% had children under the age of 18 living with them, 60.2% were married couples living together, 7.8% had a female householder with no husband present, and 29.1% were non-families. 24.3% of all households were made up of individuals, and 10.7% had someone living alone who was 65 years of age or older. The average household size was 2.12 and the average family size was 2.47.

In the place the population was spread out, with 12.4% under the age of 18, 5.0% from 18 to 24, 17.4% from 25 to 44, 39.4% from 45 to 64, and 25.7% who were 65 years of age or older. The median age was 52 years. For every 100 females, there were 100.0 males. For every 100 females age 18 and over, there were 91.0 males.

The median income for a household in the place was $83,787, and the median income for a family was $83,735. Males had a median income of over $100,000 versus $0 for females. The per capita income for the CDP was $54,883. None of the population or families were below the poverty line.

== Education ==
As with other parts of Lower Township, it is served by Lower Township School District for primary grades and Lower Cape May Regional School District for secondary grades.

David C. Douglass Memorial Elementary School is in Villas CDP. The other three elementary schools are in Cold Spring: Carl T. Mitnick (grades 1–2), Maud Abrams (grades 3–4), and Sandman Consolidated (grades 5–6). The LCMR schools (Richard Teitelman Middle and Lower Cape May Regional High School) are in the Erma area.

Students are also eligible to attend Cape May County Technical High School in Cape May Court House, which serves students from the entire county in its comprehensive and vocational programs, which are offered without charge to students who are county residents. Special needs students may be referred to Cape May County Special Services School District in the Cape May Court House area.

== Parks and recreation ==
Lower Township maintains Diamond Beach Park in Diamond Beach.

== Climate ==
According to the Köppen climate classification system, Diamond Beach has a humid subtropical climate (Cfa) with hot, moderately humid summers, cool winters and year-around precipitation. Cfa climates are characterized by all months having an average mean temperature above 32.0 °F (0.0 °C), at least four months with an average mean temperature at or above 50.0 °F (10.0 °C), at least one month with an average mean temperature at or above 71.6 °F (22.0 °C) and no significant precipitation difference between seasons. During the summer months in Diamond Beach, a cooling afternoon sea breeze is present on most days, but episodes of extreme heat and humidity can occur with heat index values at or above 95.0 °F (35.0 °C). During the winter months, episodes of extreme cold and wind can occur with wind chill values below 0.0 °F (−17.8 °C). The plant hardiness zone at Diamond Beach is 7b with an average annual extreme minimum air temperature of 6.8 °F (−14.0 °C). The average seasonal (November–April) snowfall total is 12 to 18 inches (30 to 46 cm) and the average snowiest month is February which corresponds with the annual peak in nor'easter activity.

Climate data for Diamond Beach, NJ (1981-2010 Averages)
Month	Jan	Feb	Mar	Apr	May	Jun	Jul	Aug	Sep	Oct	Nov	Dec	Year
Mean daily maximum °F (°C)	41.9 (5.5)	43.6 (6.4)	50.3 (10.2)	59.4 (15.2)	68.7 (20.4)	77.8 (25.4)	82.9 (28.3)	81.6 (27.6)	76.1 (24.5)	66.1 (18.9)	56.2 (13.4)	46.7 (8.2)	62.7 (17.1)
Daily mean °F (°C)	35.0 (1.7)	36.8 (2.7)	43.1 (6.2)	52.2 (11.2)	61.3 (16.3)	70.7 (21.5)	75.9 (24.4)	74.9 (23.8)	68.9 (20.5)	58.4 (14.7)	48.9 (9.4)	39.7 (4.3)	55.6 (13.1)
Mean daily minimum °F (°C)	28.1 (−2.2)	29.9 (−1.2)	35.9 (2.2)	44.9 (7.2)	53.9 (12.2)	63.7 (17.6)	68.9 (20.5)	68.2 (20.1)	61.8 (16.6)	50.6 (10.3)	41.6 (5.3)	32.7 (0.4)	48.4 (9.1)
Average precipitation inches (mm)	3.36 (85)	2.81 (71)	4.16 (106)	3.64 (92)	3.60 (91)	3.19 (81)	3.79 (96)	4.09 (104)	3.27 (83)	3.61 (92)	3.24 (82)	3.62 (92)	42.38 (1,076)
Average relative humidity (%)	67.4	66.5	64.7	63.0	67.4	71.9	70.7	73.3	70.5	69.1	68.0	67.7	68.4
Average dew point °F (°C)	25.3 (−3.7)	26.7 (−2.9)	32.0 (0.0)	40.0 (4.4)	50.4 (10.2)	61.2 (16.2)	65.7 (18.7)	65.8 (18.8)	58.9 (14.9)	48.3 (9.1)	38.8 (3.8)	29.9 (−1.2)	45.3 (7.4)
Source: PRISM

Climate data for North Cape May, NJ Ocean Water Temperature (6 W Diamond Beach)
Month	Jan	Feb	Mar	Apr	May	Jun	Jul	Aug	Sep	Oct	Nov	Dec	Year
Daily mean °F (°C)	37 (3)	37 (3)	42 (6)	50 (10)	59 (15)	68 (20)	73 (23)	74 (23)	72 (22)	61 (16)	52 (11)	42 (6)	56 (13)
Source: NOAA

== Ecology ==
According to the A. W. Kuchler U.S. potential natural vegetation types, Diamond Beach would have a dominant vegetation type of Northern Cordgrass (73) with a dominant vegetation form of Coastal Prairie (20).

== See also ==
- "2020 CENSUS - CENSUS BLOCK MAP: Diamond Beach CDP, NJ" (PDF). United States Census Bureau.

Preceded by Wildwood Crest	Beaches of New Jersey	Succeeded by Cape May
