= Rio Grande, New Jersey =

Place in Cape May County, New Jersey, United States

- Census-designated place
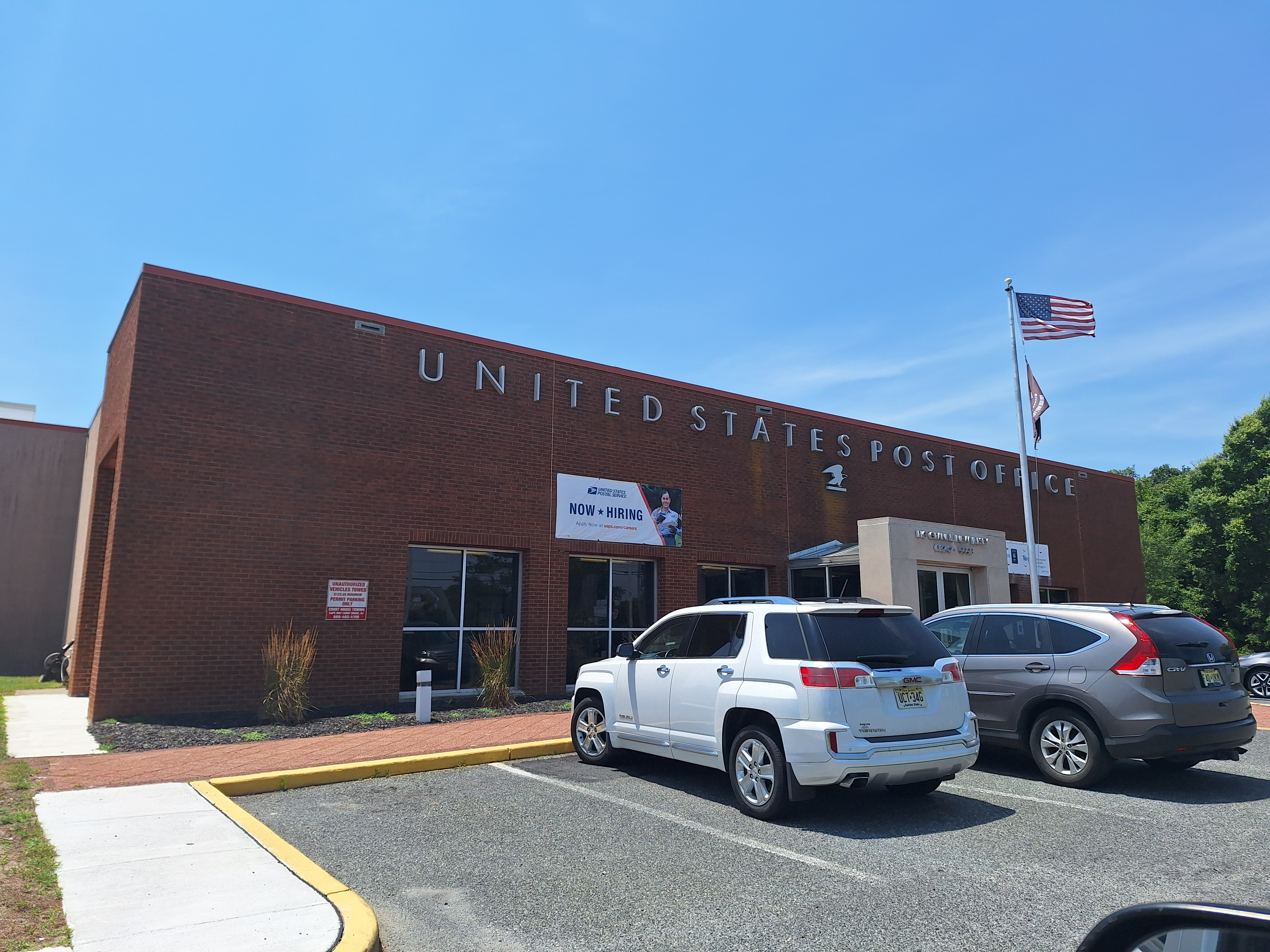
- Post office

- Map of Rio Grande highlighted within Cape May County. Right: Location of Cape May County in New Jersey.

- Location in Cape May County Location in New Jersey Location in the United States
- Coordinates: 39.019051°N 74.87787°W
- Country: United States
- State: New Jersey
- County: Cape May
- Township: Middle (most), Lower (some)

Area
  - Total: 2.73 sq mi (7.08 km^{2})
  - Land: 2.70 sq mi (6.99 km^{2})
  - Water: 0.031 sq mi (0.08 km^{2}) 1.26%
- Elevation: 20 ft (6 m)

Population (2020)
  - Total: 3,610
  - Density: 1,337.3/sq mi (516.32/km^{2})
- Time zone: UTC−05:00 (Eastern (EST))
  - Summer (DST): UTC−04:00 (Eastern (EDT))
- ZIP Code: 08242
- Area code: 609
- FIPS code: 34-63180
- GNIS feature ID: 02389752

Rio Grande (/rioʊɡrʌndeɪ/) is an unincorporated community and census-designated place (CDP) located within Middle Township and Lower Township in Cape May County, in the U.S. state of New Jersey.

Though for the 1990 to 2010 U.S. censuses the CDP was entirely located within Middle Township, a small section at the southern edge of the community, located in Lower Township, is sometimes called Rio Grande. For the 2020 U.S. census, the boundary was redrawn so that portions of Lower Township were included in the Rio Grande CDP.

It is part of the Ocean City Metropolitan Statistical Area. As of the 2020 United States census, the CDP's population was 3,610, its highest decennial census count ever and an increase of 940 (+35.2%) from the 2,679 counted at the 2020 census, which in turn had reflected an increase of 226 (+9.2%) from the 2000 census of 2,444.

== History ==
According to Jeffrey M. Dorwart, Rio Grande was founded in the mid-nineteenth century around a country store owned by the Hildreth family. The community was originally called Hildreth for that reason.

George F. Boyer and J. Pearson Cunningham explain that, during the colonial period, Aaron Leaming, the Hildreths and the Cresses had plantations in that area. Where the King's Highway crossed the road coming from Dennisville and Goshen a stage coach terminal was set up, and the spot became the center for trade for the local farming families. Boyer and Cunningham say that the area was known as "Leamings," for the prominent landholders, or as "Hildreth," the family who ran the local store. (p. 121-122) They continue, "The name, Rio Grande, was suggested by the seventh Aaron Leaming who thought this southern United States river had an attractive sound."

== Geography ==
According to the United States Census Bureau, the CDP had a total area of 2.490 square miles (6.45 km^{2}), including 2.459 square miles (6.37 km^{2}) of land and 0.031 square miles (0.080 km^{2}) of water (1.26%).

=== Climate ===
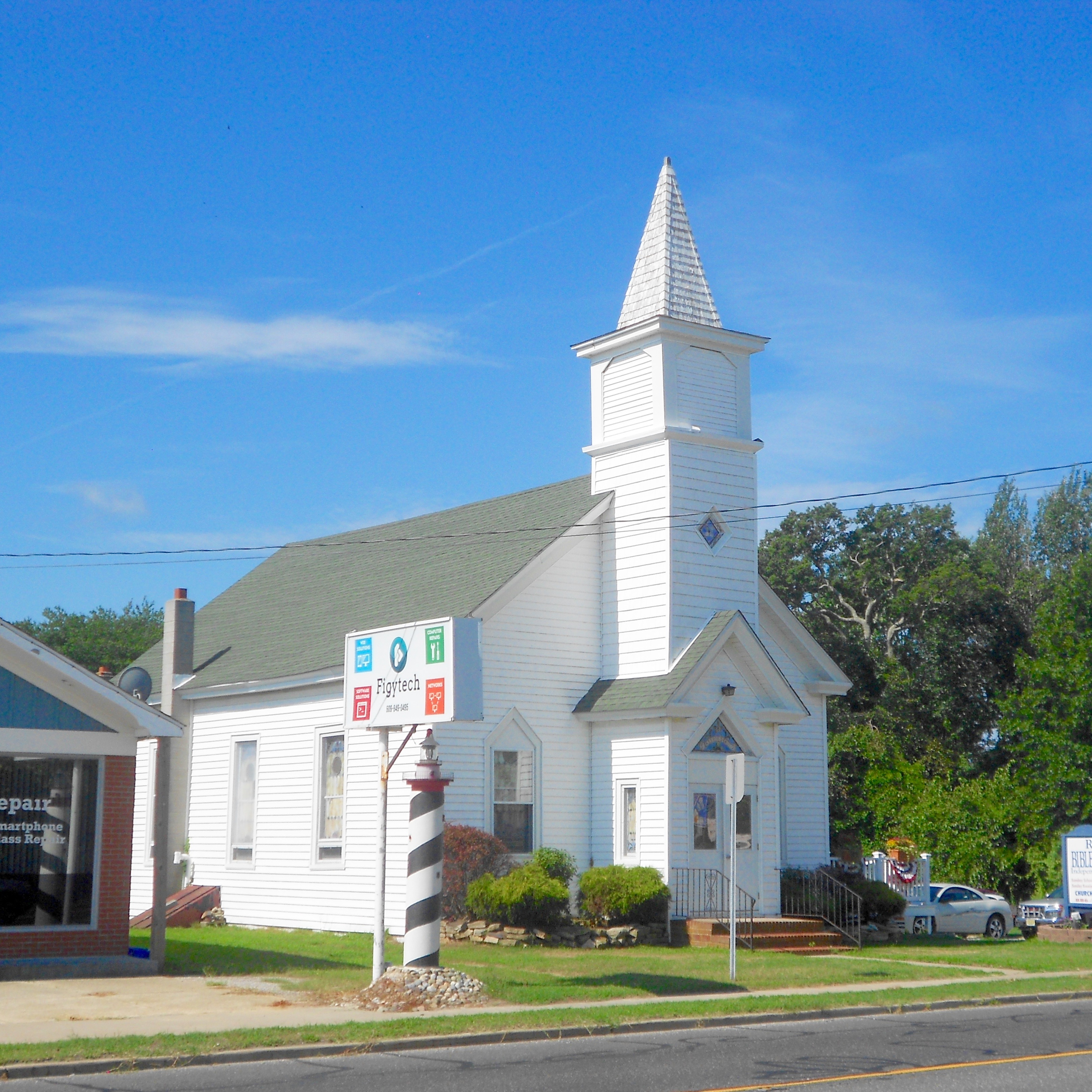
Rio Grande Bible Baptist Church

The climate in this area is characterized by hot, humid summers and generally mild to cool winters. According to the Köppen Climate Classification system, Rio Grande has a humid subtropical climate, abbreviated "Cfa" on climate maps.

== Demographics ==
Historical population
Census	Pop.	Note	%±
1970	1,203		—
1980	2,016		67.6%
1990	2,505		24.3%
2000	2,444		−2.4%
2010	2,670		9.2%
2020	3,610		35.2%
Population sources: 1950 1960 1970; 1980 1990 2000; 2010 2020

Rio Grande first appeared as an unincorporated community in the 1970 U.S. census; and then was listed as a census designated place in the 1980 U.S. census.

=== 2020 census ===
As of the 2020 census, Rio Grande had a population of 3,610. The median age was 46.8 years. 20.4% of residents were under the age of 18 and 26.9% of residents were 65 years of age or older. For every 100 females there were 90.5 males, and for every 100 females age 18 and over there were 90.6 males age 18 and over.

91.5% of residents lived in urban areas, while 8.5% lived in rural areas.

There were 1,471 households in Rio Grande, of which 24.5% had children under the age of 18 living in them. Of all households, 43.8% were married-couple households, 17.9% were households with a male householder and no spouse or partner present, and 29.6% were households with a female householder and no spouse or partner present. About 29.3% of all households were made up of individuals and 15.5% had someone living alone who was 65 years of age or older.

There were 1,805 housing units, of which 18.5% were vacant. The homeowner vacancy rate was 1.3% and the rental vacancy rate was 3.2%.

Racial composition as of the 2020 census
Race	Number	Percent
White	2,634	73.0%
Black or African American	188	5.2%
American Indian and Alaska Native	29	0.8%
Asian	99	2.7%
Native Hawaiian and Other Pacific Islander	7	0.2%
Some other race	320	8.9%
Two or more races	333	9.2%
Hispanic or Latino (of any race)	629	17.4%

=== 2010 census ===
The 2010 United States census counted 2,670 people, 1,115 households, and 730 families in the CDP. The population density was 1,085.8 people per square mile (419.2 people/km^{2}). There were 1,489 housing units at an average density of 605.5 units per square mile (233.8 units/km^{2}). The racial makeup was 86.44% (2,308) White, 5.54% (148) Black or African American, 0.26% (7) Native American, 2.51% (67) Asian, 0.04% (1) Pacific Islander, 3.22% (86) from other races, and 1.99% (53) from two or more races. Hispanic or Latino of any race were 7.68% (205) of the population.

Of the 1,115 households, 20.8% had children under the age of 18; 45.4% were married couples living together; 13.6% had a female householder with no husband present and 34.5% were non-families. Of all households, 29.1% were made up of individuals and 12.8% had someone living alone who was 65 years of age or older. The average household size was 2.37 and the average family size was 2.85.

18.4% of the population were under the age of 18, 8.0% from 18 to 24, 22.3% from 25 to 44, 31.0% from 45 to 64, and 20.3% who were 65 years of age or older. The median age was 45.9 years. For every 100 females, the population had 97.6 males. For every 100 females ages 18 and older there were 96.4 males.

=== 2000 census ===
As of the 2000 United States census there were 2,444 people, 1,029 households, and 658 families living in the CDP. The population density was 399.8 people/km^{2} (1,035 people/mi^{2}). There were 1,294 housing units at an average density of 211.7 units/km^{2} (548 units/mi^{2}). The racial makeup of the CDP was 90.79% White, 4.50% African American, 0.29% Native American, 0.94% Asian, 1.10% from other races, and 2.37% from two or more races. Hispanic or Latino of any race were 3.03% of the population.

There were 1,029 households, out of which 25.5% had children under the age of 18 living with them; 46.6% were married couples living together; 13.6% had a female householder with no husband present; and 36.0% were non-families. 30.1% of all households were made up of individuals, and 15.4% had someone living alone who was 65 years of age or older. The average household size was 2.36 and the average family size was 2.93.

In the CDP the population was spread out, with 21.6% under the age of 18, 7.7% from 18 to 24, 26.7% from 25 to 44, 24.1% from 45 to 64, and 19.9% who were 65 years of age or older. The median age was 42 years. For every 100 females, there were 91.7 males. For every 100 females age 18 and over, there were 91.8 males.

The median income for a household in the CDP was $28,424, and the median income for a family was $38,007. Males had a median income of $32,935 versus $19,643 for females. The per capita income for the CDP was $18,792. About 20.9% of families and 21.4% of the population were below the poverty line, including 32.5% of those under age 18 and 17.9% of those age 65 or over.

== Education ==
The areas within Middle Township, including almost all of Rio Grande CDP, are in the Middle Township Public Schools; it operates its campuses in Cape May Court House, including Middle Township High School.

The areas within Lower Township, including a sliver of the CDP, are in the Lower Township School District for elementary grades and the Lower Cape May Regional School District for secondary grades. The elementary school district operates Douglass School (PreK and Kindergarten) in Villas CDP and three schools in Cold Spring: Mitnick School (1–2), Abrams School (3–4), and Sandman School (5–6). The secondary school district Teitelman Middle School and Lower Cape May Regional High School in the Erma area.

Countywide schools include Cape May Technical High School (for technical school students) and Cape May County Special Services School District (for students in special education) in the Cape May Court House area.

In the era of de jure educational segregation in the United States, a school for white children in grades 1-6 was maintained in Rio Grande and a school for black children was maintained in Whitesboro in grades 1–8. White children in Rio Grande were sent to West Cape May School District for grades 7–12.

== Transportation ==
Rio Grande is situated at the junction of U.S. Route 9 and Route 47. U.S. Route 9 runs south to Cape May and north toward the Atlantic City area while Route 47 runs southeast to Wildwood and north to Millville and the Camden area. Rio Grande is accessible from the Garden State Parkway at exit 4 northbound and exit 4B southbound.

NJ Transit offers bus service from Rio Grande to Cape May and Philadelphia on the 313, 315 and 316 (seasonal only) routes, to Cape May and the Port Authority Bus Terminal in Midtown Manhattan on the 319 route, to Wildwood on the 510 route, and to Cape May and Atlantic City on the 552 route.

The Great American Trolley Company operates trolley service from North Wildwood and Wildwood to shopping centers in Rio Grande on Mondays through Fridays in the summer months.

Cape May Airport, established in 1941 as NAS Rio Grande, is located in the area, in adjacent Lower Township.

== Notable people ==
People who were born in, residents of, or otherwise closely associated with Rio Grande include:

- Jane Moffet (1930–2018), utility player who played for four seasons in the All-American Girls Professional Baseball League

== Gallery ==
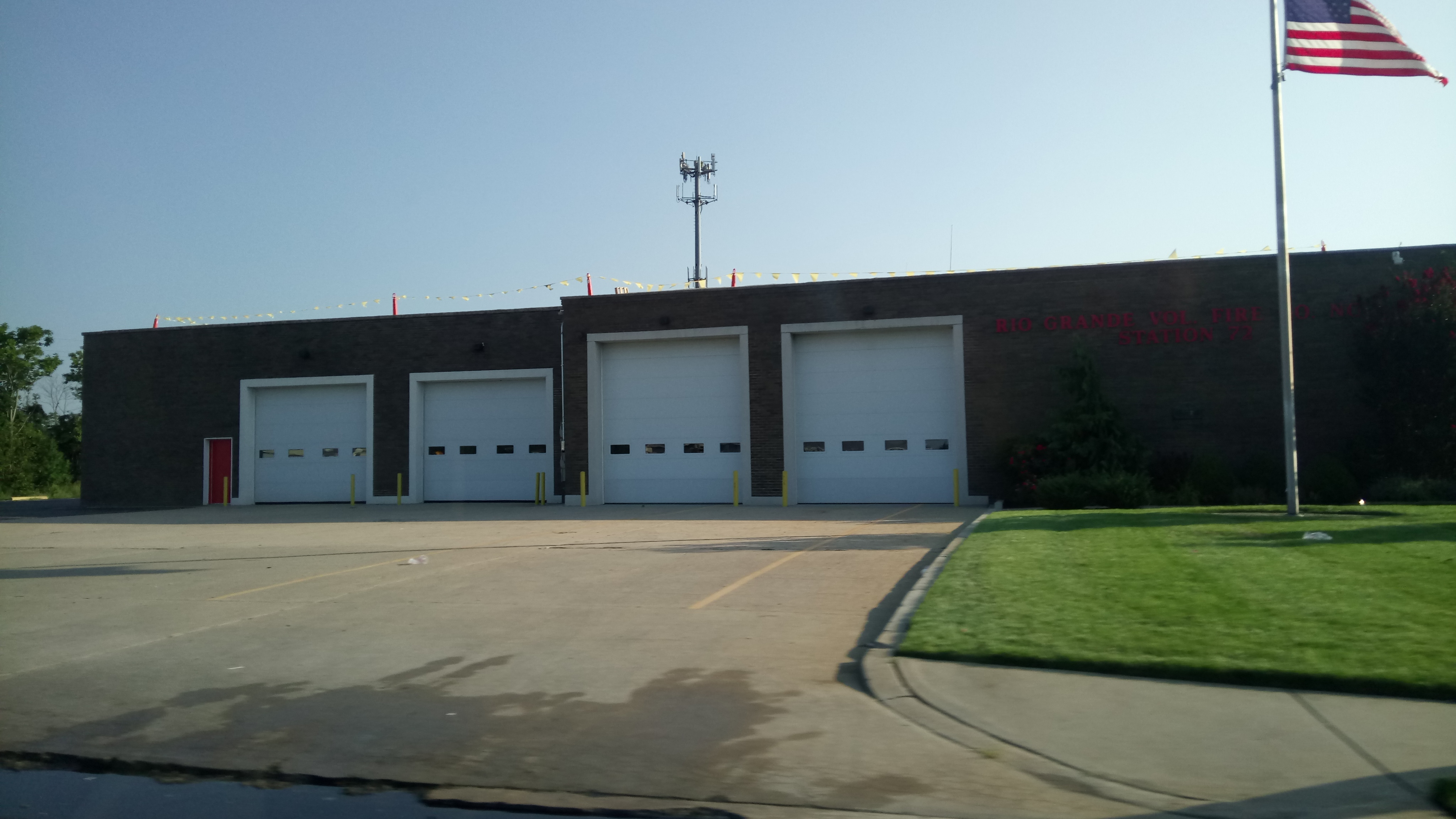
Rio Grande Fire Station
