= Cape May City School District =

School district in Cape May County, New Jersey, US

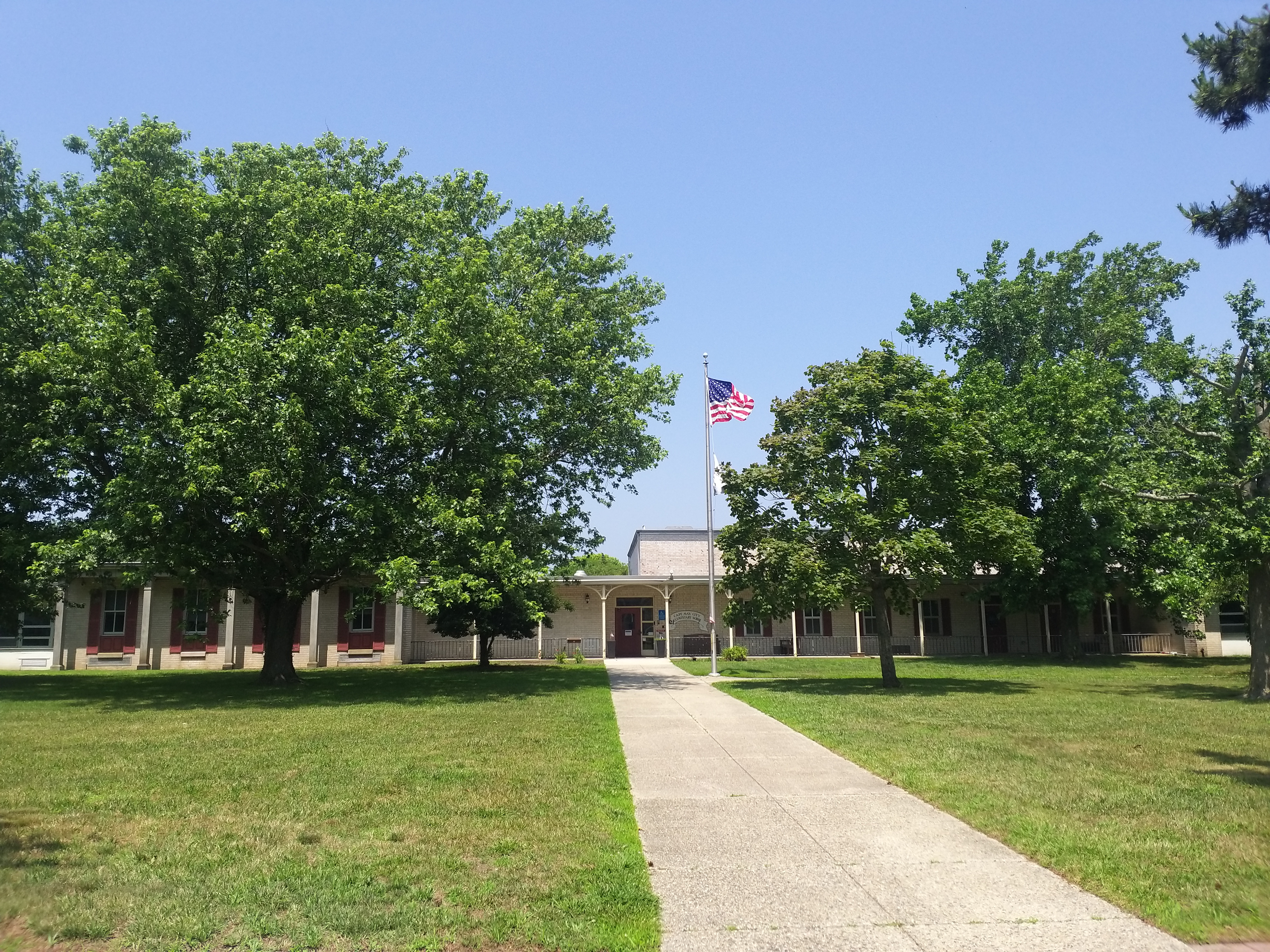
- Cape May City Elementary School

Address
- 921 Lafayette Street Cape May, Cape May County, New Jersey, 08204; United States
- Coordinates: 38.938706°N 74.918454°W

District information
- Grades: PreK to 6
- Superintendent: Zachary Palombo
- Business administrator: Patricia Ryan
- Schools: 1

Students and staff
- Enrollment: 151 (as of 2024–25)
- Faculty: 25.0 FTEs
- Student–teacher ratio: 6.1:1

Other information
- District Factor Group: CD
- Website: www.cmcboe.org
Ind.	Per pupil	District spending	Rank (*)	K-6 average	%± vs. average
1A	Total Spending	$28,761	58	$18,891	52.2%
1	Budgetary Cost	21,342	57	13,649	56.4%
2	Classroom Instruction	12,780	56	8,366	52.8%
6	Support Services	3,191	54	2,161	47.7%
8	Administrative Cost	1,837	43	1,467	25.2%
10	Operations & Maintenance	2,861	57	1,552	84.3%
13	Extracurricular Activities	341	43	39	774.4%
16	Median Teacher Salary	54,950	20	57,437
Data from NJDoE 2014 Taxpayers' Guide to Education Spending. *Of K-6 districts with any number of students. Lowest spending=1; Highest=59

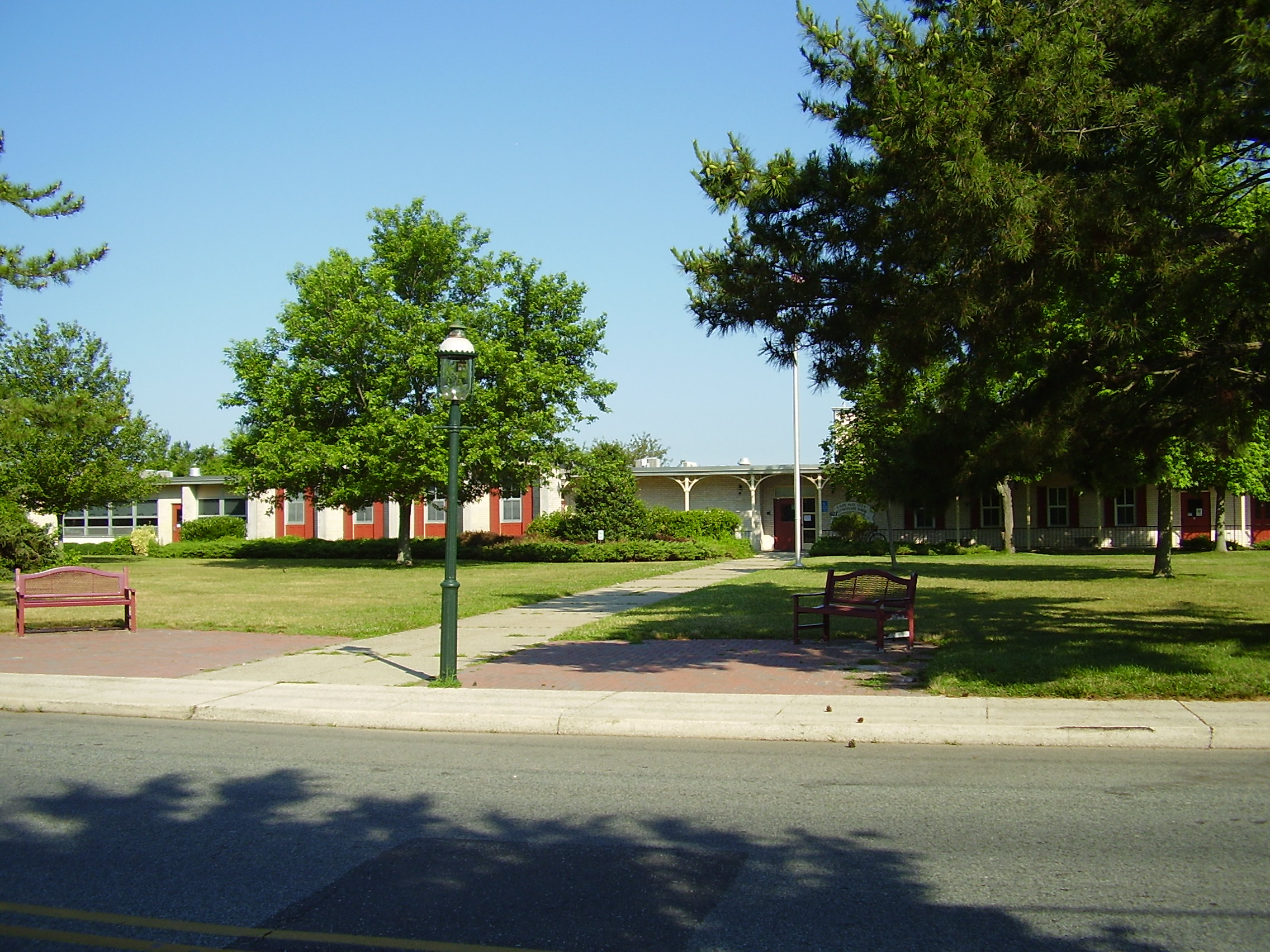
Cape May City Elementary School

Cape May City School District is a community public school district serving students in pre-kindergarten through sixth grade from Cape May, in the U.S. state of New Jersey, at Cape May City Elementary School.

As of the 2024–25 school year, the district, comprised of one school, had an enrollment of 151 students and 25.0 classroom teachers (on an FTE basis), for a student–teacher ratio of 6.1:1.

A majority of the students are children of dependents of people at United States Coast Guard Training Center Cape May, which financially and personnel-wise supports Cape May City Elementary. The district also serves students from Cape May Point, who attend as part of a sending/receiving relationship. This is because its school district, Cape May Point School District, is a non-operating district, meaning it does not operate any schools. In 2016, one student came from Cape May Point.

The district participates in the Interdistrict Public School Choice Program, which allows non-resident students to attend school in the district at no cost to their parents, with tuition covered by the resident district. Available slots are announced annually by grade.

In September 2025, the Cape May district began a study to consider combing with the West Cape May School District, which had 83 students the previous year. West Cape May sends its kindergarten students to Cape May, the two districts share a superintendent, who also serves as principal and director of special education for both districts, and they both send students to Lower Cape May Regional for grades 7–12. Complications for the consolidation include potential changes to the $1.2 million paid by the federal government for the two-thirds of Cape May students on the Coast Guard base and the lack of busing for resident students.

For seventh through twelfth grades, public school students attend the schools of the Lower Cape May Regional School District, which serves students from Cape May, Lower Township and West Cape May, along with students from Cape May Point who attend as part of a sending/receiving relationship. Schools in the district (with 2024–25 enrollment data from the National Center for Education Statistics) are Richard M. Teitelman Middle School with 394 students in grades 7–8 and Lower Cape May Regional High School with 717 students in grades 9–12.

== History ==
Indian Queen School, located in a former hotel and integrated racially, was established in 1860 and was replaced in 1867 by racially segregated schools on Franklin Street, because James S. Kennedy, the superintendent of Cape May schools, insisted on racial segregation. The black school was in a one room building while the white school had a multi-room wooden structure. A facility with three stories built around the start of the 20th century housed the white elementary school and an integrated high school. The high school later moved into its own building, and in 1928 a new brick facility for black students was opened. Schools were integrated in 1948, after the 1947 New Jersey Constitution banned racial segregation in education.

In 1958, Paul W. Schmitdtchen became the superintendent of the Cape May school. Schmitdtchen decided to create a new high school, and therefore he is considered the father of LCMRHS, which opened in 1961. Schmitdtchen retired in 1972.

In previous eras the student body was about 300 with some students coming from residents of the United States Coast Guard Training Center Cape May. Because property values increased in Cape May, fewer local families could afford housing, and the number of Cape May students declined. Prior to the September 11 terrorist attacks there were discussions about reducing employee levels and possibly merging Cape May Elementary and West Cape May Elementary School. After September 11 the Coast Guard presence increased and enrollment increased. The influx of families from the Coast Guard base meant that the school remained open. The Coast Guard officially adopted Cape May Elementary in 2012. Richard Degener of The Press of Atlantic City wrote "What has always been a symbiotic relationship has grown downright cozy".

In 2020, the district gave some land to the city government so the latter could establish a park.

In 2020, the Cape May and West Cape May School District began sharing a single superintendent. In Summer 2021, Zachary Palombo became the shared superintendent of both the Cape May City and West Cape May districts.

The district had been classified by the New Jersey Department of Education as being in District Factor Group "CD", the sixth-highest of eight groupings. District Factor Groups organize districts statewide to allow comparison by common socioeconomic characteristics of the local districts. From lowest socioeconomic status to highest, the categories are A, B, CD, DE, FG, GH, I and J.

Circa 2022, the West Cape May district began having its Pre-Kindergarten students attend school in the Cape May school. In 2025, the administrations of the Cape May and West Cape May districts were considering a merger.

=== Schools ===
==== Cape May City Elementary School ====
The school historically had a playground designed for older children. Circa 2013 it spent $40,000 to build a playground designed for younger children. Since 25 volunteers from the Coast Guard built the playground, the school administration saved on labor costs and had a larger playground built. The playground is used by community groups. The school also has a pool, a library, and the Dellas little league field, also used by the community.

=== Former schools ===
==== Cape May High School ====
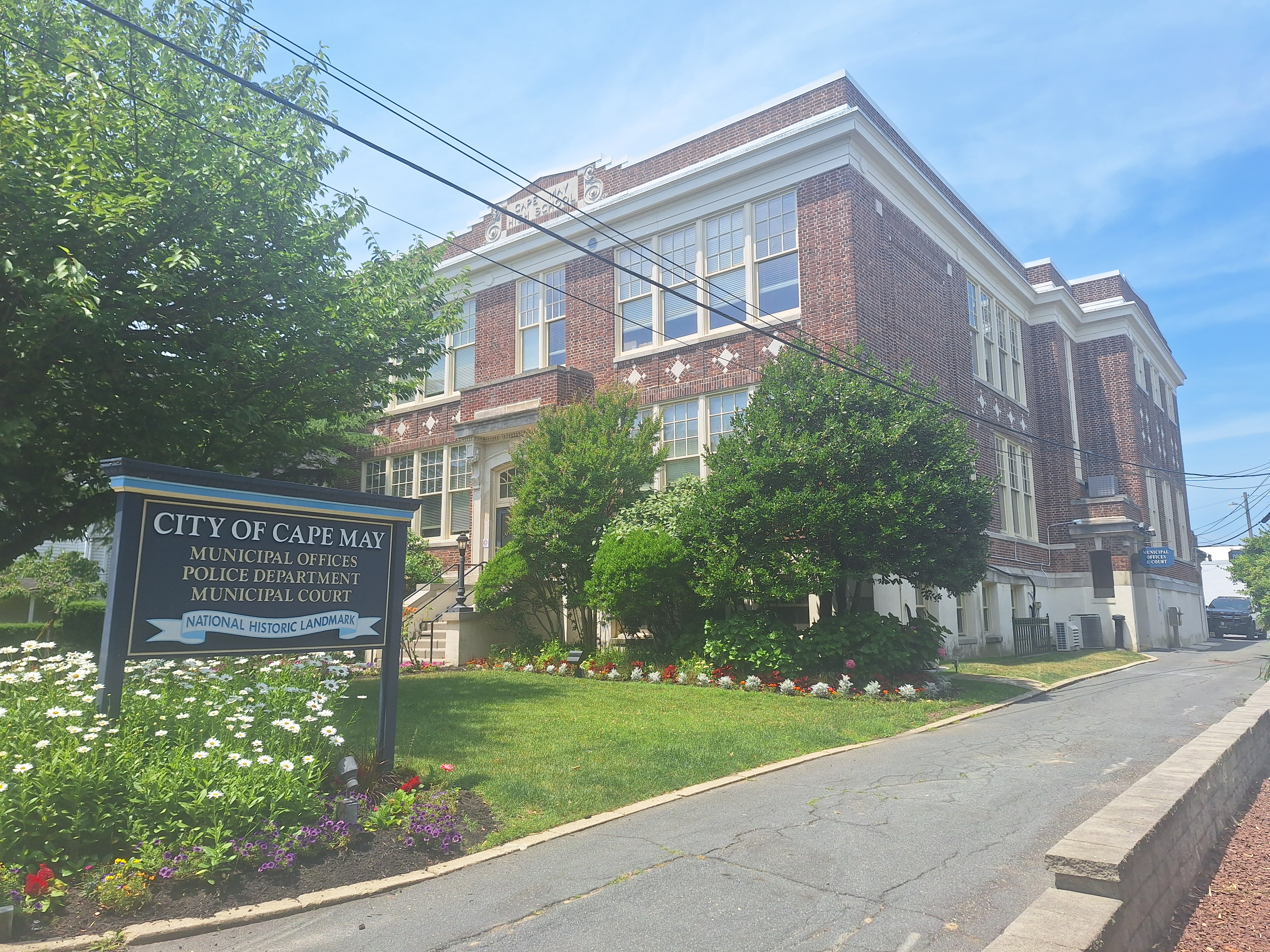
The former Cape May High School (second building), now Cape May City Hall

The first Cape May High School, built in 1901, was designed by Seymour Davis and built for $35,000. This facility was shared with the white elementary school. In 1917 a new Cape May High School facility was built, with the 1901 building becoming an elementary school. Cape May High School educated students of all races. The former convention hall was used as a basketball arena, baccalaureate venue, an auditorium, and a graduation hall by Cape May High. Paul S. Ensminger, originally from Palmyra, Pennsylvania, served as principal of CMHS for a 24 year period.

Cape May High closed effective December 22, 1960, and LCMRHS opened in 1961. Circa 1970 the first Cape May High School building was demolished, and an Acme Markets location was constructed on the site. The second Cape May High School building in 1961 became the city hall, and it also serves as the police station.

==== Franklin Street School ====
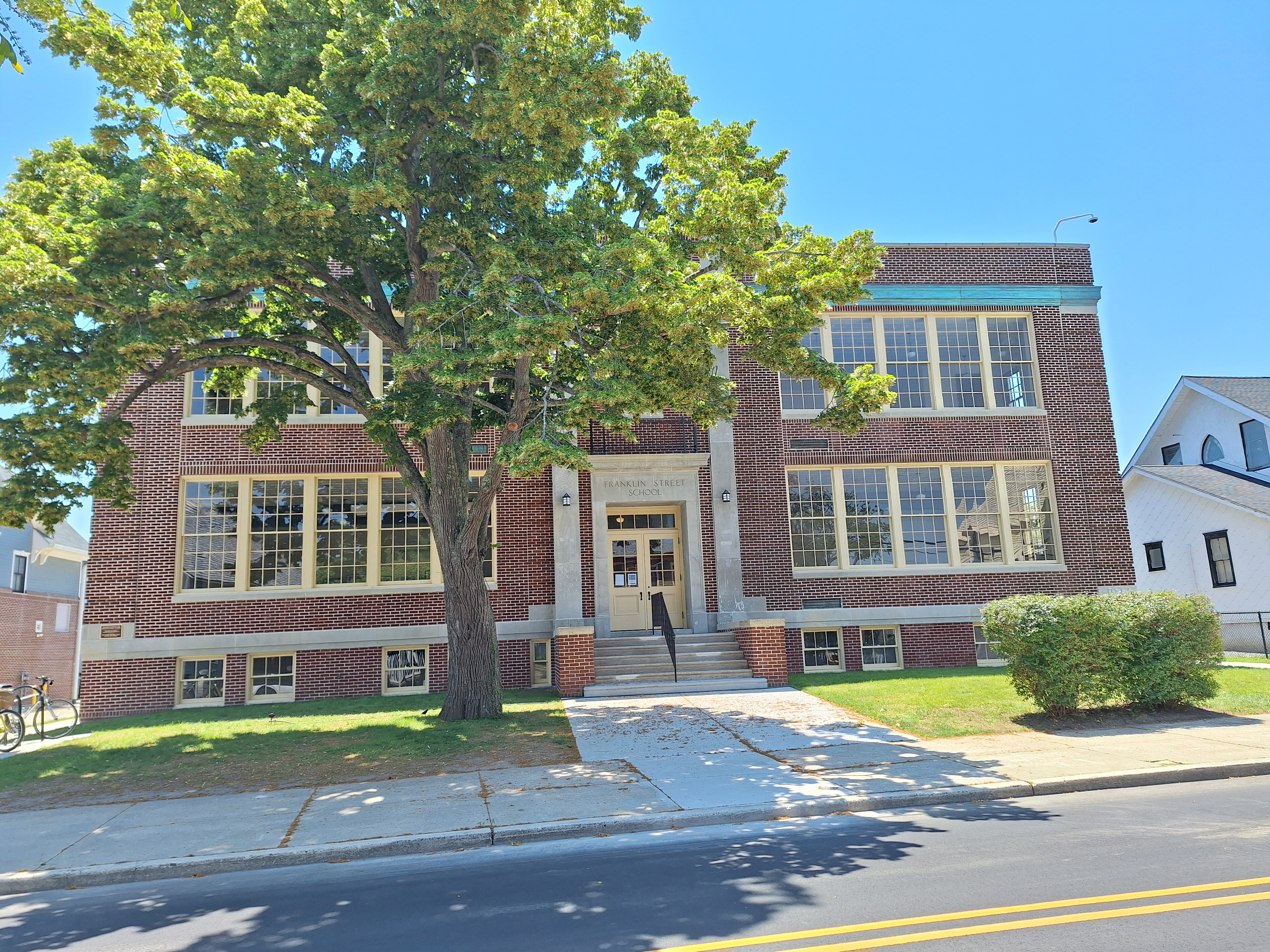
The former Franklin Street School

In the past Cape May elementary schools were segregated on the basis of race, with black elementary school students attending Franklin Street School. It opened in September 1928, and was the first public school earmarked for black children in Cape May. The school was built with a gymnasium inaccessible from the rest of the building which was used by the high school, integrated but made up of mostly white students. The Franklin Street students used it on rain days when their playground was not usable.

The school was decommissioned after educational segregation ended in 1948. The Center for Community Arts, as of 2021, aimed to renovate the building. In 2024, the Cape May City Library of the Cape May County Library moved from a previous location to the renovated Franklin Street School.

== Operations ==
As of 2013, the taxpayers of Cape May spend under $1.5 million annually, while the Coast Guard spends about $700,000 annually to support the school.

In 2021 there were plans to establish a dedicated path for bicycles between the Coast Guard base and the school so children living on-base have a safer way to travel to school. By June the plans were suspended.

== Student body ==
As of 2021 the average student population was around 150. Most students in the district come from the Coast Guard base, with 60% coming from there in 2016. Palumbo stated, as paraphrased by Bill Barlow of The Press of Atlantic City, "it is unlikely the school could remain open" without the Coast Guard students.

In 2016, 25% of students were non-public housing residents who resided elsewhere on Cape May while 15% came from Cape May public housing. Two children were homeless and one lived in Cape May Point.

== School ==
Cape May City Elementary School served 155 students in grades PreK–6 in the 2024–25 school year. Its capacity is 227.

- Zachary Palombo, principal

== Administration ==
Core members of the district's administration are:

- Zachary H. Palombo, superintendent
- Patricia Ryan, business administrator / board secretary

== Board of education ==
The district's board of education is comprised of nine members who set policy and oversee the fiscal and educational operation of the district through its administration. As a Type II school district, the board's trustees are elected directly by voters to serve three-year terms of office on a staggered basis, with three seats up for election each year held (since 2012) as part of the November general election. The board appoints a superintendent to oversee the district's day-to-day operations and a business administrator to supervise the business functions of the district.

The Coast Guard assigns staff to assist with Cape May Elementary graduation events.

== Programs ==
The school holds reading events, a triathlon, a Thursday homework club, a boat building contest, and the end of the school year picnic, and the Starry the Bear Coast Guard journey program. The Coast Guard is involved in those programs. The Starry program features a cartoon bear who is shown going through Coast Guard training.
