= West Cape May School District =

School district in Cape May County, New Jersey, US

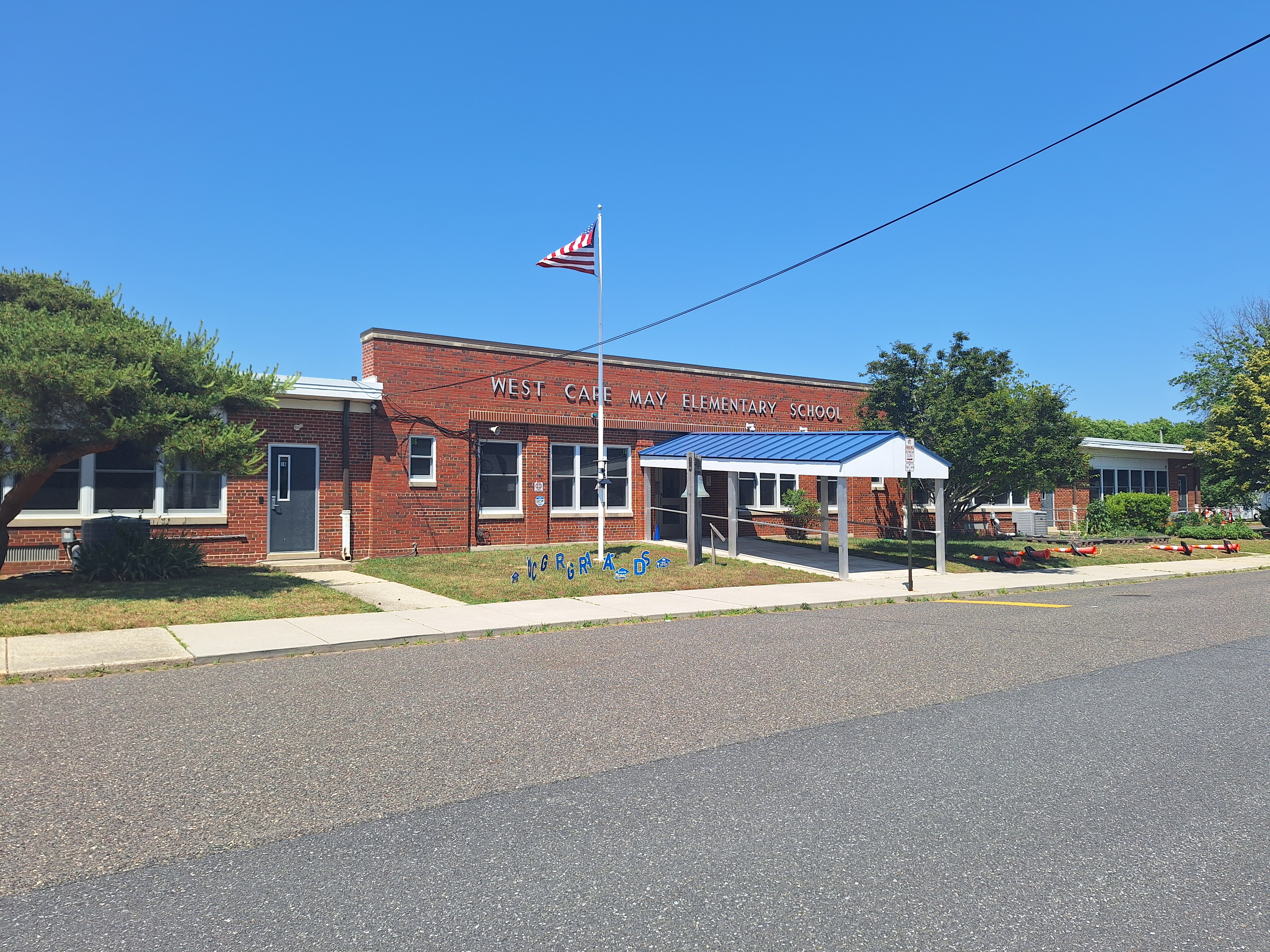
- West Cape May Elementary School

Address
- 301 Moore Street West Cape May, Cape May County, New Jersey, 08204
- Coordinates: 38.940301°N 74.933559°W

District information
- Grades: PreK to 6
- Superintendent: Zachary Palombo
- Business administrator: Patricia Ryan
- Schools: 1

Students and staff
- Enrollment: 86 (as of 2024–25)
- Faculty: 9.7 FTEs
- Student–teacher ratio: 8.9:1

Other information
- District Factor Group: DE
- Website: www.wcmschool.net
Ind.	Per pupil	District spending	Rank (*)	K-6 average	%± vs. average
1A	Total Spending	$20,750	50	$18,891	9.8%
1	Budgetary Cost	15,605	38	13,649	14.3%
2	Classroom Instruction	10,096	44	8,366	20.7%
6	Support Services	2,919	52	2,161	35.1%
8	Administrative Cost	793	1	1,467	−45.9%
10	Operations & Maintenance	1,770	41	1,552	14.0%
13	Extracurricular Activities	27	20	39	−30.8%
16	Median Teacher Salary	52,878	13	57,437
Data from NJDoE 2014 Taxpayers' Guide to Education Spending. *Of K-6 districts with any number of students. Lowest spending=1; Highest=59

West Cape May School District is a community public school district located in West Cape May in Cape May County, in the U.S. state of New Jersey, that serves students in pre-kindergarten through sixth grade.

As of the 2024–25 school year, the district, comprised of one school, had an enrollment of 86 students and 9.7 classroom teachers (on an FTE basis), for a student–teacher ratio of 8.9:1.

The district has been a participant in the Interdistrict Public School Choice Program, which allows non-resident students to attend school in the district at no cost to their parents, with tuition covered by the resident district. Available slots are announced annually by grade.

In September 2025, the West Cape May district began a study to consider combing with the Cape May City School District, which had 158 students the previous year. West Cape May sends its kindergarten students to Cape May, the two districts share a superintendent, who also serves as principal and director of special education for both districts, and they both send students to Lower Cape May Regional for grades 7–12. Complications for the consolidation include potential changes to the $1.2 million paid by the federal government for the two-thirds of Cape May students on the Coast Guard base and the lack of busing for resident students in both districts.

For seventh through twelfth grades, public school students attend the schools of the Lower Cape May Regional School District, which serves students from Cape May, Lower Township and West Cape May, along with students from Cape May Point who attend as part of a sending/receiving relationship. Schools in the district (with 2024–25 enrollment data from the National Center for Education Statistics) are Richard M. Teitelman Middle School with 394 students in grades 7–8 and Lower Cape May Regional High School with 717 students in grades 9–12.

== History ==
Previously a West Cape May High School existed. In an era of de jure educational segregation in the United States normally only white students were permitted to attend though the state made exceptions. Ordinarily black students attended Downingtown Industrial High School instead of West Cape May High. The district maintained separate white and black elementary schools, the latter West Cape May Colored Elementary School. "The Annex" was the school for black elementary school children. In 1948, when segregation was still active, white children in the Rio Grande section of Middle Township were sent to West Cape May for grades 7-12.

West Cape Elementary previously served up to grade 8.

In the 2016–17 school year, the district had 98 students, making it the eighth-smallest district in the state.

In 2013, the Lower Cape May Regional School District received a feasibility study that looked at ways to reconfigure the district, which had been established in 1956. The study considered Cape May City withdrawing from the regional district or the dissolution of the district, converting Lower Township's existing PreK-6 district to serve PreK-12, as the regional district's school facilities are located in the township. Cape May City and West Cape May could have seen annual savings approaching a combined $6 million from the dissolution of the district.

In 2020, the West Cape May district began sharing a superintendent with the Cape May City School District. In Summer 2021, Zachary Palombo became the shared superintendent of the two districts.

The district had been classified by the New Jersey Department of Education as being in District Factor Group "DE", the fifth-highest of eight groupings. District Factor Groups organize districts statewide to allow comparison by common socioeconomic characteristics of the local districts. From lowest socioeconomic status to highest, the categories are A, B, CD, DE, FG, GH, I and J.

Circa 2022, the West Cape May district began having its Pre-Kindergarten students attend school in the Cape May school. In 2025, the administrations of the Cape May and West Cape May districts were considering a merger.

== School ==
West Cape May Elementary School serves students in grades PreK–6. The school had an enrollment of 76 students in the 2024–25 school year. It has a capacity of 117.

== Administration ==
Core members of the district's administration are:

- Zachary Palombo, superintendent and principal
- Patricia Ryan, business administrator and board secretary

== Board of education ==
The district's board of education is comprised of five members who set policy and oversee the fiscal and educational operation of the district through its administration. As a Type II school district, the board's trustees are elected directly by voters to serve three-year terms of office on a staggered basis, with either one or two seats up for election each year held (since 2012) as part of the November general election. The board appoints a superintendent to oversee the district's day-to-day operations and a business administrator to supervise the business functions of the district.

== See also ==
- Non-high school district
