= Memorial Elementary School =

Memorial Elementary School may refer to:

- Memorial Elementary School - Houston, Texas - List of Houston Independent School District elementary schools
- David C. Douglass Veterans Memorial School - Lower Township, New Jersey - Lower Township School District
