= Erma, New Jersey =

Populated place in Cape May County, New Jersey, US

- Census-designated place
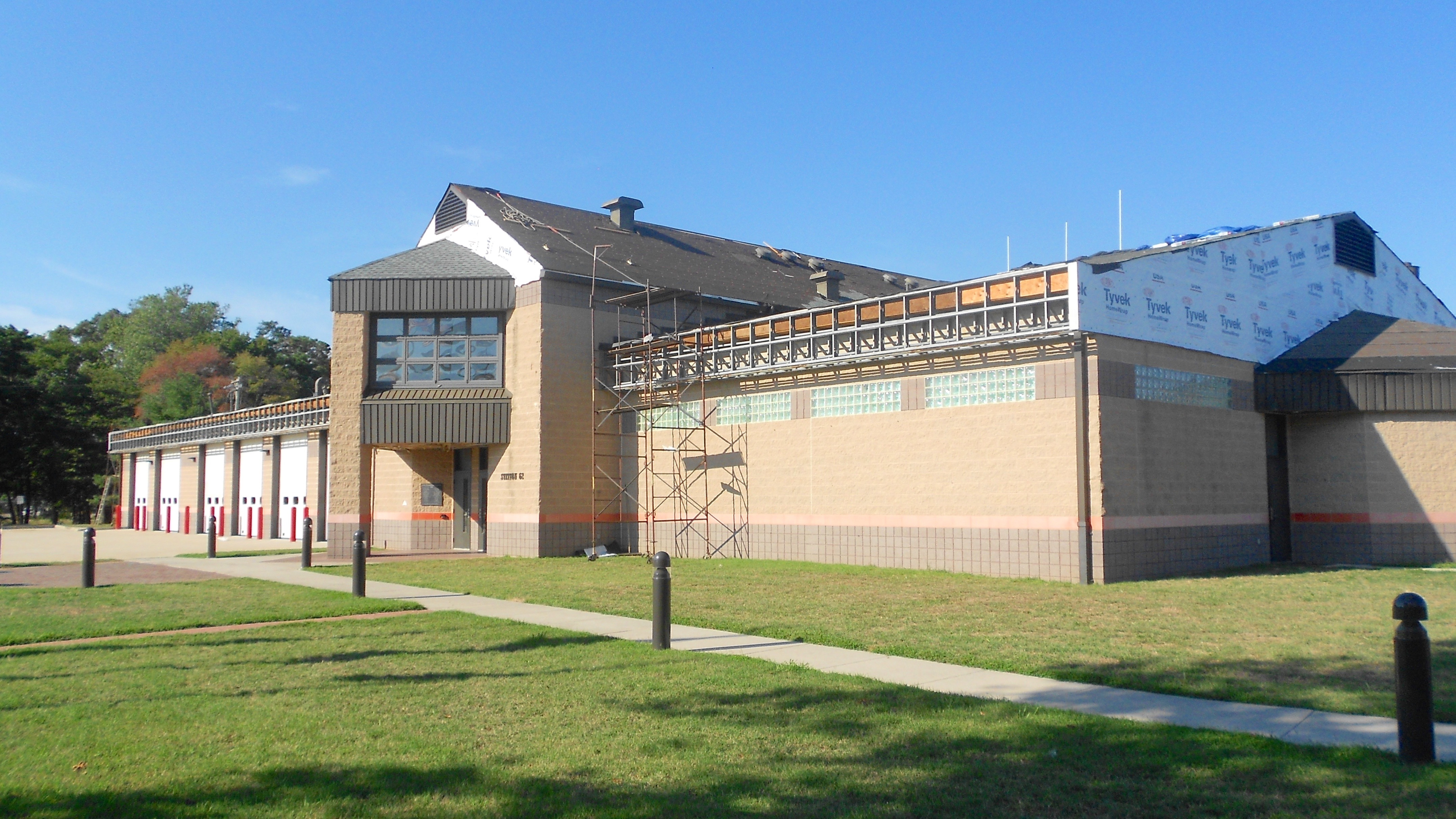
- Erma Volunteer Fire Company

- Map of Erma CDP in Cape May County. Inset: Location of Cape May County in New Jersey.

- Location in Cape May County Location in New Jersey Location in the United States
- Coordinates: 38.996931°N 74.891122°W
- Country: United States
- State: New Jersey
- County: Cape May
- Township: Lower

Area
  - Total: 3.01 sq mi (7.80 km^{2})
  - Land: 2.92 sq mi (7.55 km^{2})
  - Water: 0.097 sq mi (0.25 km^{2}) 2.97%
- Elevation: 9.8 ft (3 m)

Population (2020)
  - Total: 2,031
  - Density: 696.3/sq mi (268.84/km^{2})
- Time zone: UTC−05:00 (Eastern (EST))
  - Summer (DST): UTC−04:00 (Eastern (EDT))
- ZIP Code: 08204 - Cape May
- Area code: 609
- FIPS code: 34-21660
- GNIS feature ID: 02389049

Erma is an unincorporated community and census-designated place (CDP) located within Lower Township in Cape May County, in the U.S. state of New Jersey. As of the 2020 United States census, the CDP's population was 2,031, a decline of 103 from the 2010 census count of 2,134.

== Geography ==
According to the United States Census Bureau, the CDP had a total area of 3.360 square miles (8.70 km^{2}), including 3.260 square miles (8.44 km^{2}) of land and 0.100 square miles (0.26 km^{2}) of water (2.97%).

== Demographics ==
Historical population
Census	Pop.	Note	%±
1980	1,774		—
1990	2,045		15.3%
2000	2,088		2.1%
2010	2,134		2.2%
2020	2,031		−4.8%
Population sources: 1950 1960 1970; 1980 1990 2000; 2010 2020

Erma first appeared as a census designated place in the 1980 U.S. census.

=== Racial and ethnic composition ===
Erma CDP, New Jersey – Racial and ethnic composition Note: the US Census treats Hispanic/Latino as an ethnic category. This table excludes Latinos from the racial categories and assigns them to a separate category. Hispanics/Latinos may be of any race.
Race / Ethnicity (NH = Non-Hispanic)	Pop 2000	Pop 2010	Pop 2020	% 2000	% 2010	% 2020
White alone (NH)	2,008	2,008	1,781	96.17%	94.10%	87.69%
Black or African American alone (NH)	10	23	27	0.48%	1.08%	1.33%
Native American or Alaska Native alone (NH)	1	5	4	0.05%	0.23%	0.20%
Asian alone (NH)	22	20	20	1.05%	0.94%	0.98%
Native Hawaiian or Pacific Islander alone (NH)	0	3	0	0.00%	0.14%	0.00%
Other race alone (NH)	2	1	7	0.10%	0.05%	0.34%
Mixed race or Multiracial (NH)	10	18	85	0.48%	0.84%	4.19%
Hispanic or Latino (any race)	35	56	107	1.68%	2.62%	5.27%
Total	2,088	2,134	2,031	100.00%	100.00%	100.00%

=== 2020 census ===
As of the 2020 census, Erma had a population of 2,031. The median age was 49.1 years. 18.7% of residents were under the age of 18 and 21.8% of residents were 65 years of age or older. For every 100 females there were 90.3 males, and for every 100 females age 18 and over there were 88.7 males age 18 and over.

80.0% of residents lived in urban areas, while 20.0% lived in rural areas.

There were 808 households in Erma, of which 24.1% had children under the age of 18 living in them. Of all households, 54.0% were married-couple households, 15.6% were households with a male householder and no spouse or partner present, and 24.0% were households with a female householder and no spouse or partner present. About 27.6% of all households were made up of individuals and 15.9% had someone living alone who was 65 years of age or older.

There were 919 housing units, of which 12.1% were vacant. The homeowner vacancy rate was 1.7% and the rental vacancy rate was 13.4%.

=== 2010 census ===
The 2010 United States census counted 2,134 people, 821 households, and 596 families in the CDP. The population density was 654.6 people per square mile (252.7 people/km^{2}). There were 920 housing units at an average density of 282.2 units per square mile (109.0 units/km^{2}). The racial makeup was 95.74% (2,043) White, 1.12% (24) Black or African American, 0.23% (5) Native American, 0.94% (20) Asian, 0.14% (3) Pacific Islander, 0.70% (15) from other races, and 1.12% (24) from two or more races. Hispanic or Latino of any race were 2.62% (56) of the population.

Of the 821 households, 26.6% had children under the age of 18; 55.9% were married couples living together; 10.8% had a female householder with no husband present and 27.4% were non-families. Of all households, 22.9% were made up of individuals and 9.9% had someone living alone who was 65 years of age or older. The average household size was 2.59 and the average family size was 3.04.

21.2% of the population were under the age of 18, 8.4% from 18 to 24, 21.4% from 25 to 44, 34.3% from 45 to 64, and 14.8% who were 65 years of age or older. The median age was 44.4 years. For every 100 females, the population had 96.7 males. For every 100 females ages 18 and older there were 94.3 males.

=== 2000 census ===
As of the 2000 United States census, there were 2,088 people, 751 households, and 561 families living in the CDP. The population density was 240.7 people/km^{2} (623 people/mi^{2}). There were 846 housing units at an average density of 97.5 units/km^{2} (253 units/mi^{2}). The racial makeup of the CDP was 97.22% White, 0.48% African American, 0.05% Native American, 1.05% Asian, 0.48% from other races, and 0.72% from two or more races. Hispanic or Latino of any race were 1.68% of the population.

There were 751 households, out of which 38.9% had children under the age of 18 living with them, 60.7% were married couples living together, 10.3% had a female householder with no husband present, and 25.2% were non-families. 20.8% of all households were made up of individuals, and 8.7% had someone living alone who was 65 years of age or older. The average household size was 2.77 and the average family size was 3.24.

In the CDP the population was spread out, with 28.4% under the age of 18, 7.3% from 18 to 24, 27.9% from 25 to 44, 24.1% from 45 to 64, and 12.3% who were 65 years of age or older. The median age was 38 years. For every 100 females, there were 97.5 males. For every 100 females age 18 and over, there were 89.6 males.

The median income for a household in the CDP was $64,261, and the median income for a family was $69,063. Males had a median income of $45,694 versus $21,923 for females. The per capita income for the CDP was $20,765. About 1.8% of families and 3.9% of the population were below the poverty line, including 4.9% of those under age 18 and 6.5% of those age 65 or over.

== Transportation ==
The main transportation route for Erma is U.S. Route 9.

The Cape May Airport is located in Lower Township, and has an Erma postal address though it is not in the CDP.

== Government and infrastructure ==
The Lower Township Police Department station has an Erma address but is outside of the CDP.

== Education ==
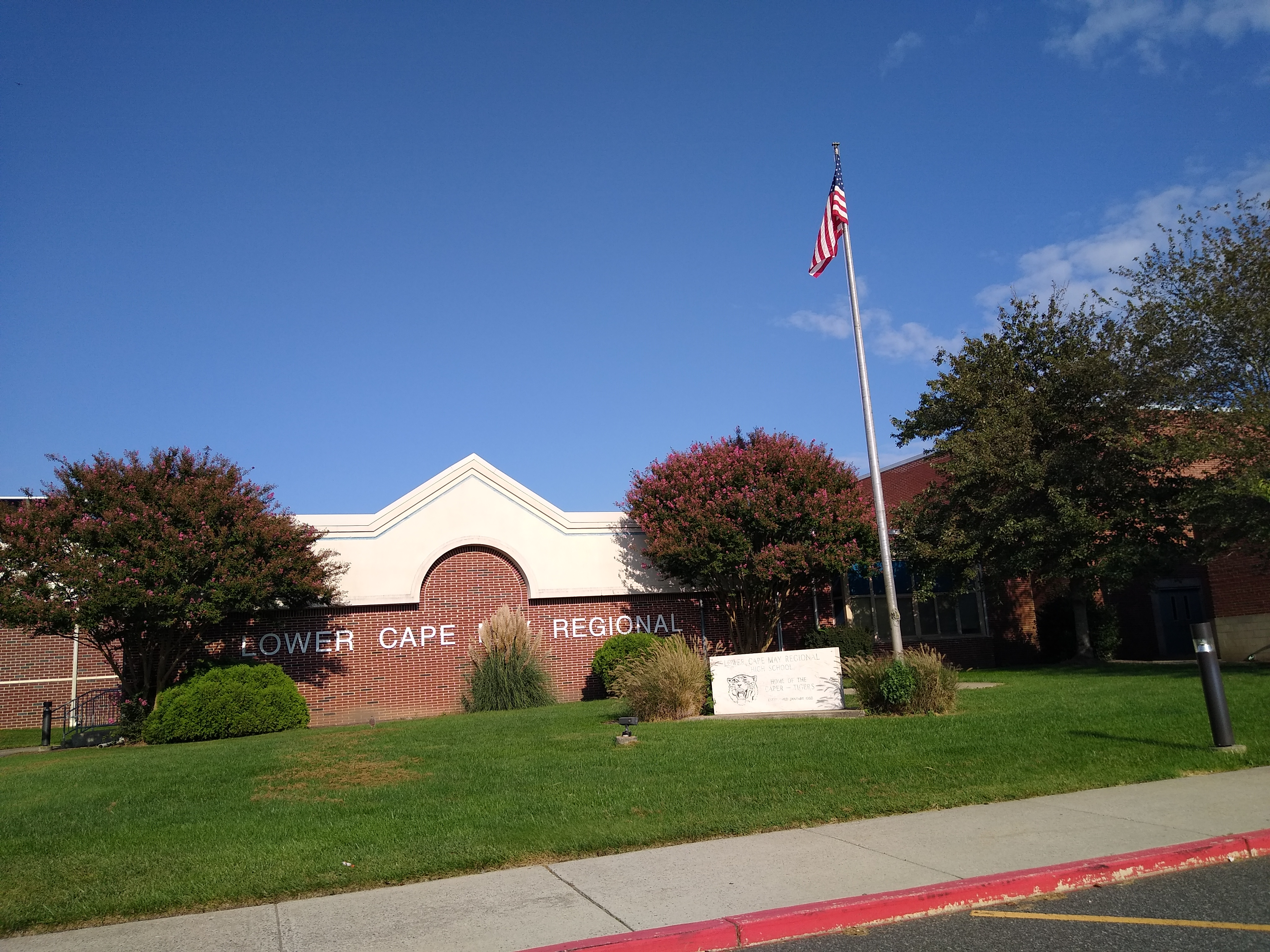
Lower Cape May Regional High School

As with other parts of Lower Township, it is served by Lower Township School District for primary grades and Lower Cape May Regional School District (LCMR) for secondary grades; the latter operates Teitelman Middle School and Lower Cape May Regional High School.

The LCMR district describes its facilities as being in Erma; the schools and district headquarters are not in the census-designated place. The Cape May County Herald, and the Press of Atlantic City describe the school complex as being in Erma.

The elementary schools are in as follows: David C. Douglass Memorial Elementary School (pre-Kindergarten and Kindergarten) is in Villas CDP. The other three elementary schools are in Cold Spring: Carl T. Mitnick (grades 1–2), Maud Abrams (grades 3–4), and Sandman Consolidated (grades 5–6).

Students are also eligible to attend Cape May County Technical High School in the Cape May Court House area, which serves students from the entire county in its comprehensive and vocational programs, which are offered without charge to students who are county residents. Special needs students may be referred to Cape May County Special Services School District in the Cape May Court House area.

== Parks and recreation ==
Lower Township maintains Freeman Douglass Park (Bennett's Crossing) in Erma.

== Notable people ==
People who were born in, residents of, or otherwise closely associated with Erma include:

- Madie Gibson born 1997), association footballer who plays as a forward or winger for League of Ireland club Athlone Town
- Charles W. Sandman Jr. (1921–1985), represented New Jersey's 2nd congressional district from 1967 to 1975.
- Matt Szczur (born 1989), professional baseball player.
