= Atlantic City Weekly =

- Type: Alternative weekly
- Format: Tabloid
- Owner: Lee Enterprises
- Founder: Lew Steiner
- Publisher: Lew Steiner
- Editor: Pamela Dollak
- Founded: 1974
- Ceased publication: 2023
- Headquarters: 1000 West Washington Avenue, Pleasantville, New Jersey 08232-3100
- Country: United States
- Website: atlanticcityweekly.com

Atlantic City Weekly (previously Whoot!) was a free weekly newspaper in Atlantic City, New Jersey that ran from 1974 until 2023. It covered articles on news, entertainment, casinos and gambling, dining, real estate, sports, movies, and nightlife. It also featured photographs capturing scenes from Atlantic City.

== History ==
The newspaper was founded in 1974 under the name Whoot! by Lewis B. Steiner and his parents, Herb and Marcia Steiner, while Lewis was a junior at Stockton College in Pomona, New Jersey. Herb served as the feature editor until his death in 1989, after which Marcia assumed the role of editor and food reviewer until her death in 1998. Lewis' wife, Christine Steiner, whom he married in 1981, served as the office manager.

== Acquisition and closure ==
In 2000, Review Publishing LP of Philadelphia acquired the newspaper, making it a sister publication to the Philadelphia Weekly. Subsequently, it underwent a name change to Atlantic City Weekly and adopted a similar format. Steiner continued his roles as founder, sales manager, and publisher, while the editorial team included Jeff Schwachter as editor, Lori Hoffman and Ray Schweibert as associate editors, and Craig Billow as art director.

In 2015, Review Publishing sold its newspapers, and Atlantic City Weekly was acquired by BH Media, the parent company of The Press of Atlantic City.

On April 27, 2023, it was announced that Atlantic City Weekly, along with its sister publication At the Shore, and The Current of Northfield, Linwood, and Somers Point, would cease operations effective immediately.
