= George Hildreth House =

Historic house in New Jersey, United States

- U.S. National Register of Historic Places
- New Jersey Register of Historic Places
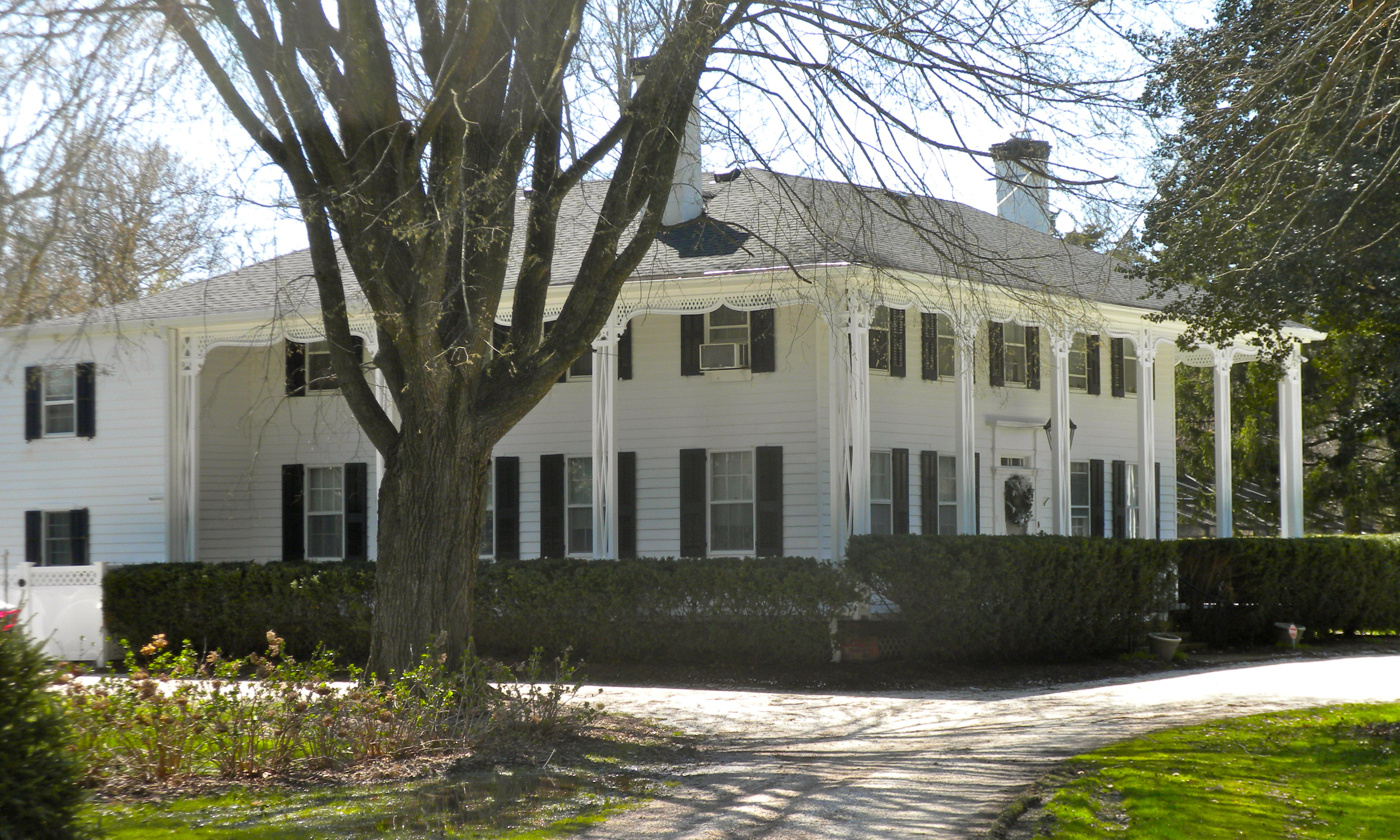

- Location within Cape May County, New Jersey Location within New Jersey Location within the United States
- Location: 731 Seashore Road, Lower Township, New Jersey
- Coordinates: 38°58′42″N 74°54′44″W
- Area: 3 acres (1.2 ha)
- Built: 1850
- Architectural style: Gothic Revival
- NRHP reference No.: 99000905
- NJRHP No.: 191

Significant dates
- Added to NRHP: July 28, 1999
- Designated NJRHP: May 27, 1999

The George Hildreth House is located at 731 Seashore Road in the Cold Spring section of Lower Township in Cape May County, New Jersey, United States. The historic house was built in 1850 and was added to the National Register of Historic Places on July 28, 1999, for its significance in architecture.

The Gothic Reival house was built for businessman George Hildreth in 1850. According to the nomination form, the architectural style is "more likely influenced by the architecture prevalent in Cape May at the time than by southern plantations." After his death in 1897, his son Lewis Hildreth inherited it.

== See also ==
- National Register of Historic Places listings in Cape May County, New Jersey
