= Cold Spring, New Jersey =

Populated place in Cape May County, New Jersey, US

- Unincorporated community
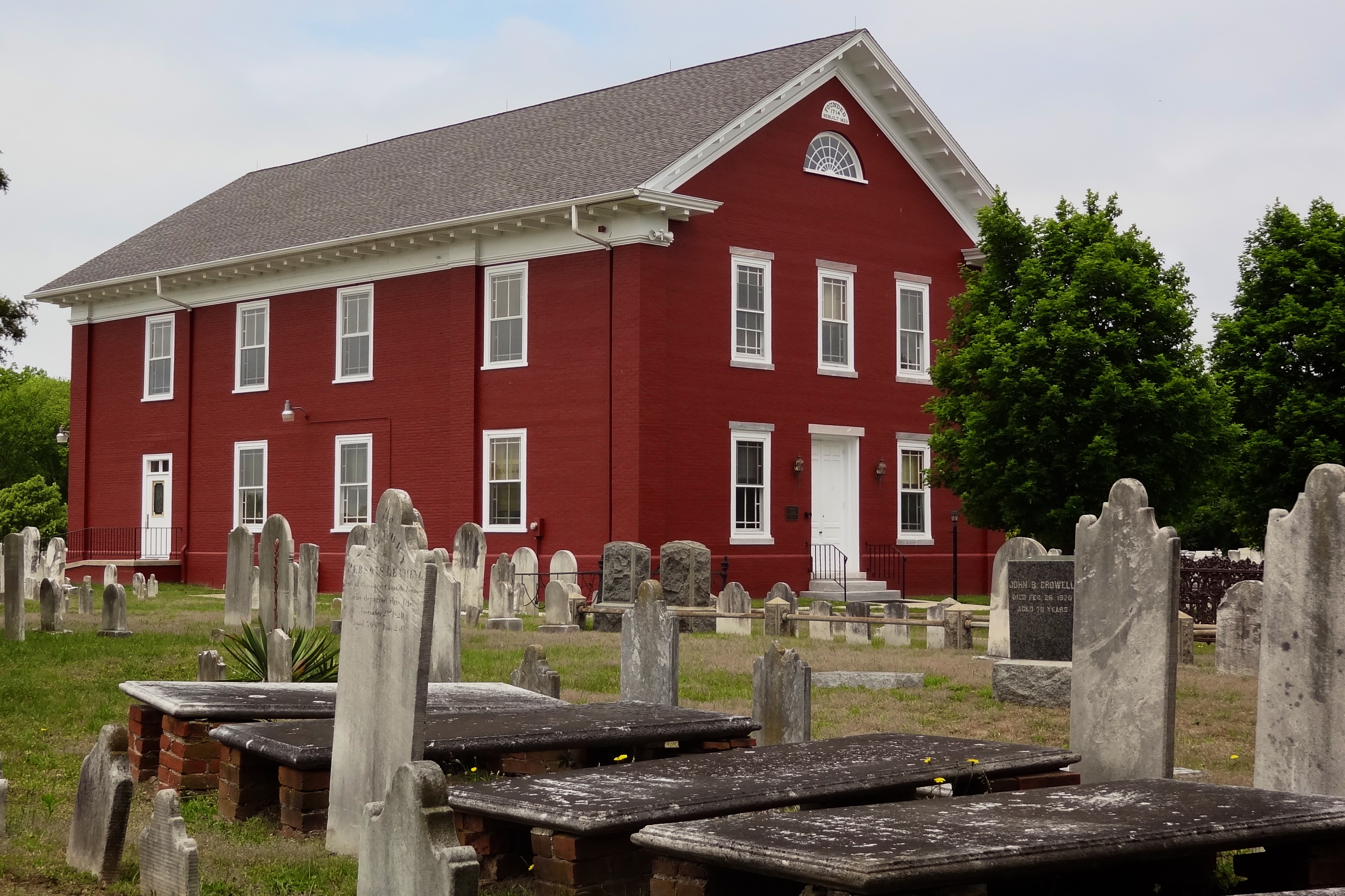
- Cold Spring Presbyterian Church in 2012

- Location within Cape May County, New Jersey Location within New Jersey Location within the United States
- Coordinates: 38°58′00″N 74°54′59″W
- Country: United States
- State: New Jersey
- County: Cape May
- Township: Lower
- Elevation: 16 ft (4.9 m)
- GNIS feature ID: 875544

Cold Spring is an unincorporated community in Lower Township, Cape May County, in the U.S. state of New Jersey.

== History ==
A post office was established in 1809, with Aaron Eldredge as the first postmaster.

There are several historic properties in the area. The Cold Spring Presbyterian Church, also known as the "Old Brick", is a historic church listed on the National Register of Historic Places in 1991. The George Hildreth House was listed on the NRHP in 1999.

The Historic Cold Spring Village is an open-air museum containing several NRHP listed buildings. The Cold Spring Grange Hall, listed in 1998, serves as the entrance to the village.

== Education ==
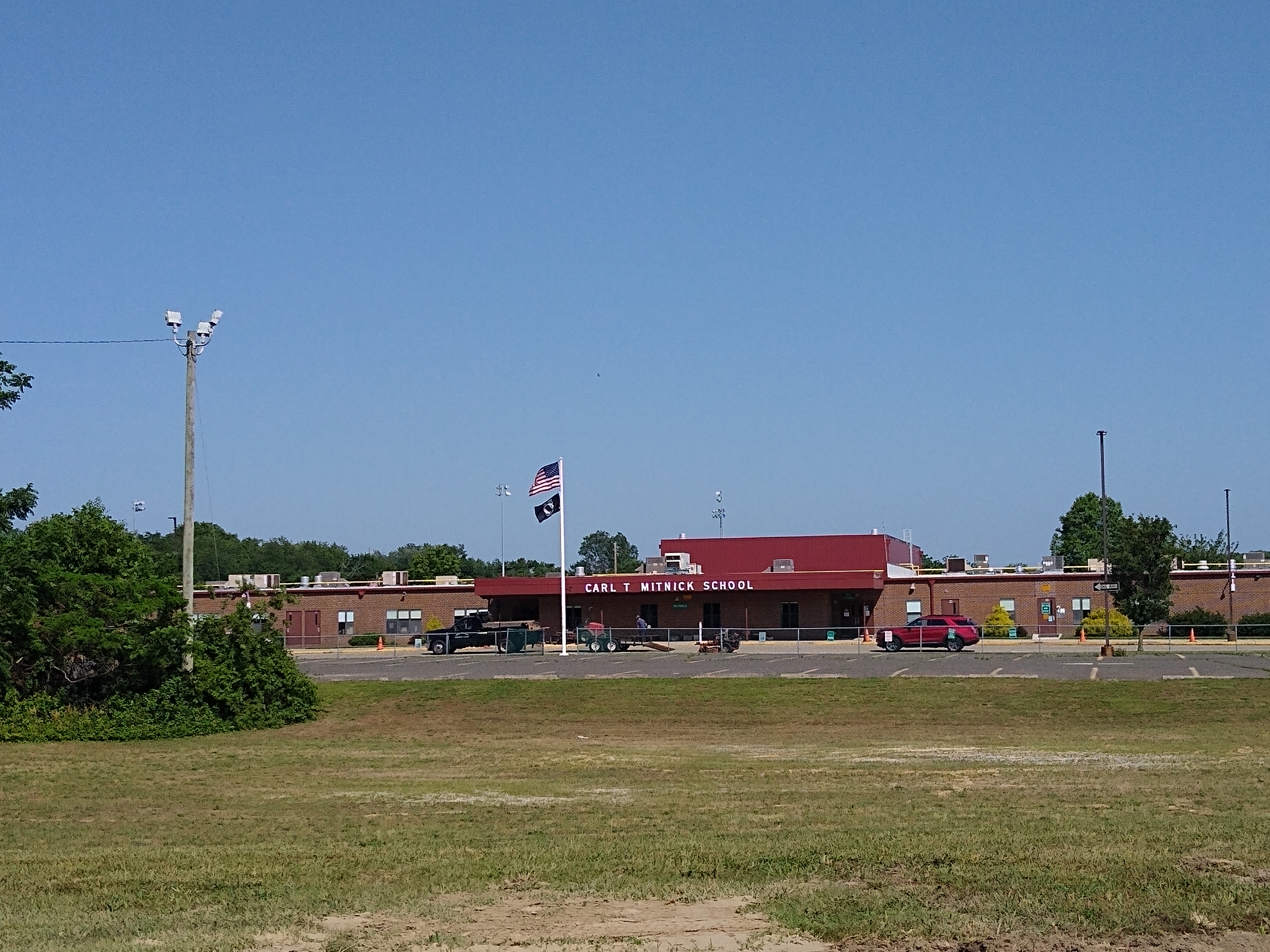
Carl T. Mitnick School in Cold Spring, which houses the Lower Township School District administration

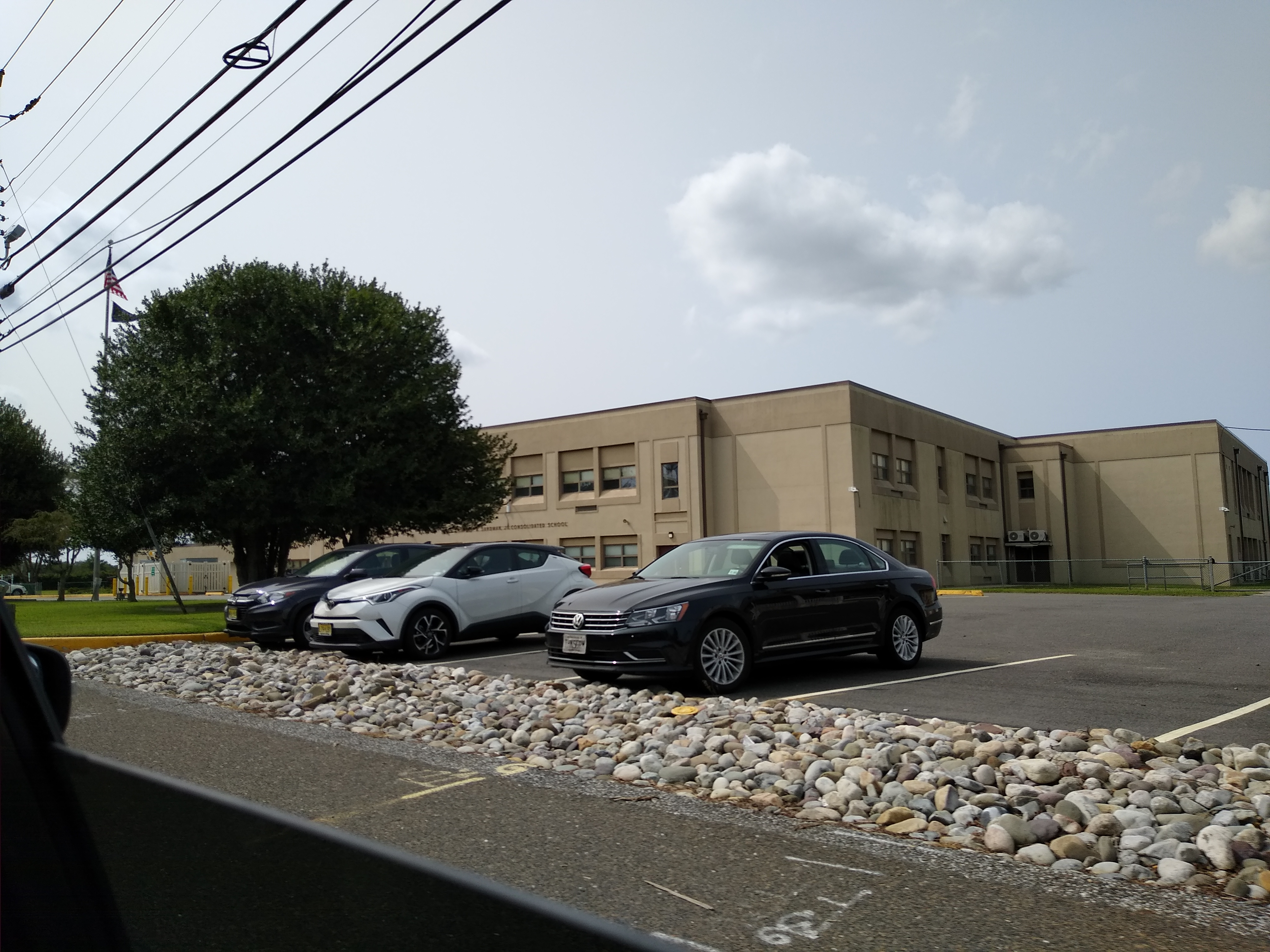
Charles W. Sandman Consolidated School in Cold Spring

As with other parts of Lower Township it is covered by Lower Township School District for elementary grades and Lower Cape May Regional School District for secondary grades.

Three of the Lower Township elementary district facilities are in Cold Spring:

- Carl T. Mitnick Elementary School (grades 1–2) - This facility houses the district administration. The school was named after Carl T. Mitnick, who donated land to the township. He developed Tranquility Park and did development in North Cape May.
- Maud Abrams Elementary School (grades 3–4)
- Sandman Consolidated School (grades 5–6)

David Douglass School (pre-kindergarten and kindergarten) is in Villas CDP. The LCMR schools (Richard Teitelman Middle and Lower Cape May Regional High School) are in the Erma area.

Students are also eligible to attend Cape May County Technical High School in Cape May Court House, which serves students from the entire county in its comprehensive and vocational programs, which are offered without charge to students who are county residents. Special needs students may be referred to Cape May County Special Services School District in Cape May Court House.

In the mid-20th century there was a separate Cold Spring Elementary School. It enrolled students of all races as there was no dedicated school for black children in proximity.

== Notable people ==
- T. Millet Hand (1902–1956), politician

== See also ==
- Cold Spring Inlet
