= Lower Township School District =

School district in Lower Township, New Jersey, US

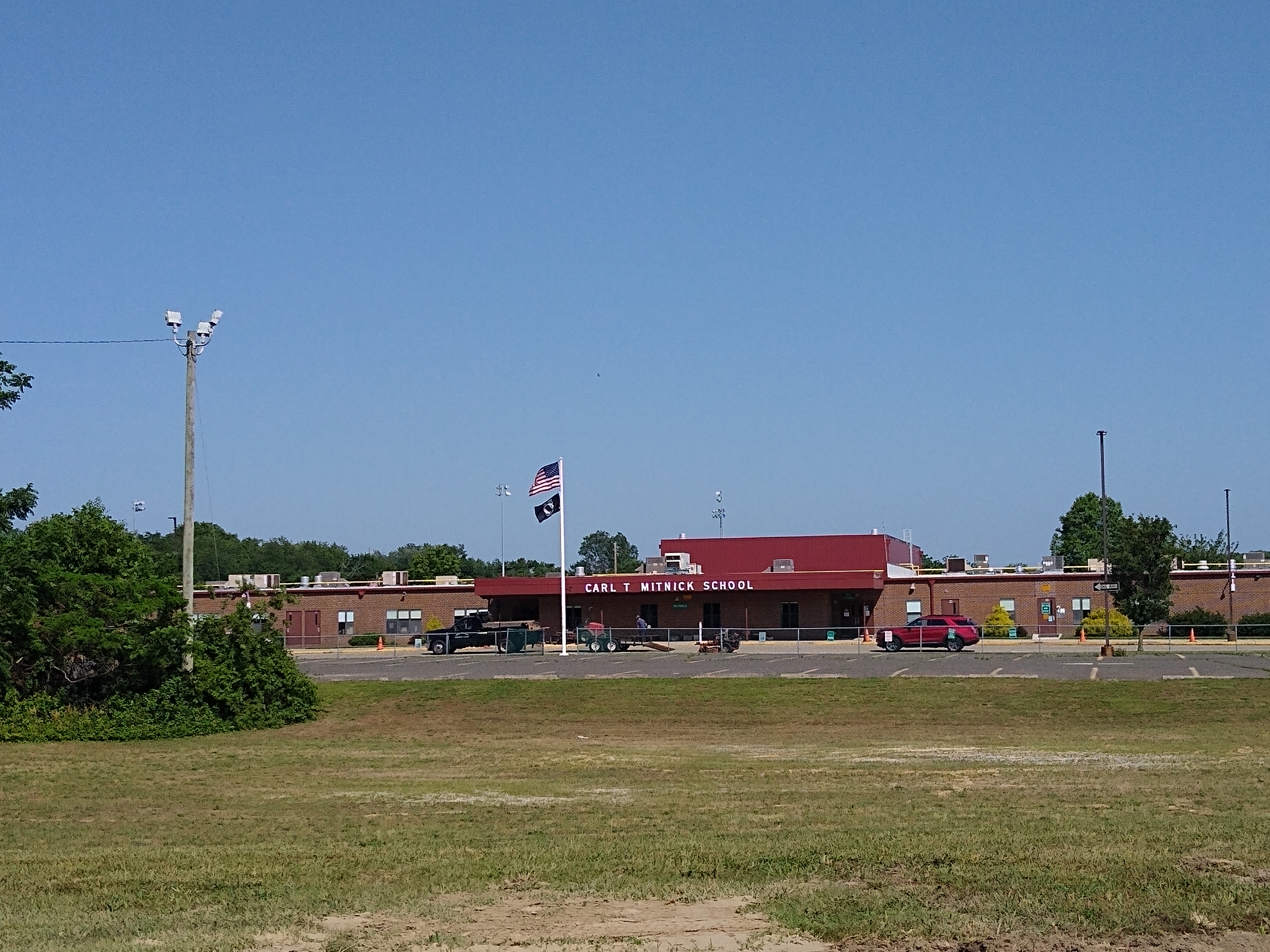
- Carl T. Mitnick School in Cold Spring, which houses grades 1-2 and the school district administration

Address
- 905 Seashore Road Lower Township, Cape May County, New Jersey, 08204; United States
- Coordinates: 38.970405°N 74.920651°W

District information
- Grades: PreK-6
- Superintendent: Van Cathcart
- Business administrator: Katie Siciliano
- Schools: 4

Students and staff
- Enrollment: 1,401 (as of 2024–25)
- Faculty: 129.0 FTEs
- Student–teacher ratio: 10.9:1

Other information
- District Factor Group: B
- Website: lowertwpschools.com
Ind.	Per pupil	District spending	Rank (*)	K-6 average	%± vs. average
1A	Total Spending	$16,929	25	$18,891	−10.4%
1	Budgetary Cost	13,611	19	13,649	−0.3%
2	Classroom Instruction	8,170	19	8,366	−2.3%
6	Support Services	2,259	30	2,161	4.5%
8	Administrative Cost	1,284	9	1,467	−12.5%
10	Operations & Maintenance	1,714	38	1,552	10.4%
16	Median Teacher Salary	55,899	25	57,437
Data from NJDoE 2014 Taxpayers' Guide to Education Spending. *Of K-6 districts with any number of students. Lowest spending=1; Highest=59

The Lower Township School District is a comprehensive community public school district that serves students in pre-kindergarten through sixth grade from Lower Township, in Cape May County, in the U.S. state of New Jersey.

As of the 2024–25 school year, the district, comprised of four schools, had an enrollment of 1,401 students and 129.0 classroom teachers (on an FTE basis), for a student–teacher ratio of 10.9:1.

The Lower Township School District participates in the Interdistrict Public School Choice Program, which allows non-resident students to attend the district's schools without cost to their parents, with tuition paid by the state. Seats in the program for non-resident students are specified by the district and are allocated by lottery.

For seventh through twelfth grades, public school students attend the schools of the Lower Cape May Regional School District, which also serves students from Cape May City and West Cape May, along with students from Cape May Point who attend the district as part of a sending/receiving relationship. Schools in the district (with 2024–25 enrollment data from the National Center for Education Statistics) are Richard M. Teitelman Middle School with 394 students in grades 7-8 and Lower Cape May Regional High School with 717 students in grades 9-12.

== History ==
In 1931, Cape May Point School District closed its only school and began sending students to Lower Township schools. Currently, Cape May Point sends to Cape May City School District.

The district had been classified by the New Jersey Department of Education as being in District Factor Group "B", the second lowest of eight groupings. District Factor Groups organize districts statewide to allow comparison by common socioeconomic characteristics of the local districts. From lowest socioeconomic status to highest, the categories are A, B, CD, DE, FG, GH, I and J.

== Awards and recognition ==
Maud Abrams School was recognized by Governor Jim McGreevey in 2003 as one of 25 schools selected statewide for the First Annual Governor's School of Excellence award.

== Schools and facilities ==
Schools in the district (with 2024–25 enrollment data from the National Center for Education Statistics) are:

- David C. Douglass Veterans Memorial School with 275 students in grades PreK–K
  - The school is in the Villas census-designated place. Its building capacity is 529.
  - Rachel Howgate, principal
- Carl T. Mitnick School with 428 students in grades 1-2
  - The school is in the Cold Spring community. Its student capacity is 552. The district administration is on the school property, behind the main school building. Additionally the property houses the Lower Township Children's Memorial Garden, which is in honor of students who died. The school was named for Carl T. Mitnick, who donated land to the township. He developed Tranquility Park and did development in North Cape May.
  - Allyson O'Shea, principal
- Maud T. Abrams School with 354 students in grades 3–4
  - The school is in the Cold Spring community. Groundbreaking occurred in 1966, and its cost was to be $595,000. Its building capacity is 616.
  - John King, principal
- Charles W. Sandman Consolidated School with 332 students in grades 5–6
  - The school is in the Cold Spring community. Its building capacity is 518.
  - The Lower Township Consolidated School opened circa 1930. Articles described it as being in Cold Spring, or in Erma. In 1932 a fire destroyed the building, which was described as having ten, or eight rooms. The building was replaced, and in 1949 there were plans to convert a kitchen and an auditorium into classrooms. In 1986 it was renamed after Charles W. Sandman Jr. after all members of the school board agreed to do so.
  - The district administration was formerly in the Sandman facility. It occupied what the district called a "brown Victorian structure". By 2017 this administration building was demolished.
  - Chris Shivers, principal
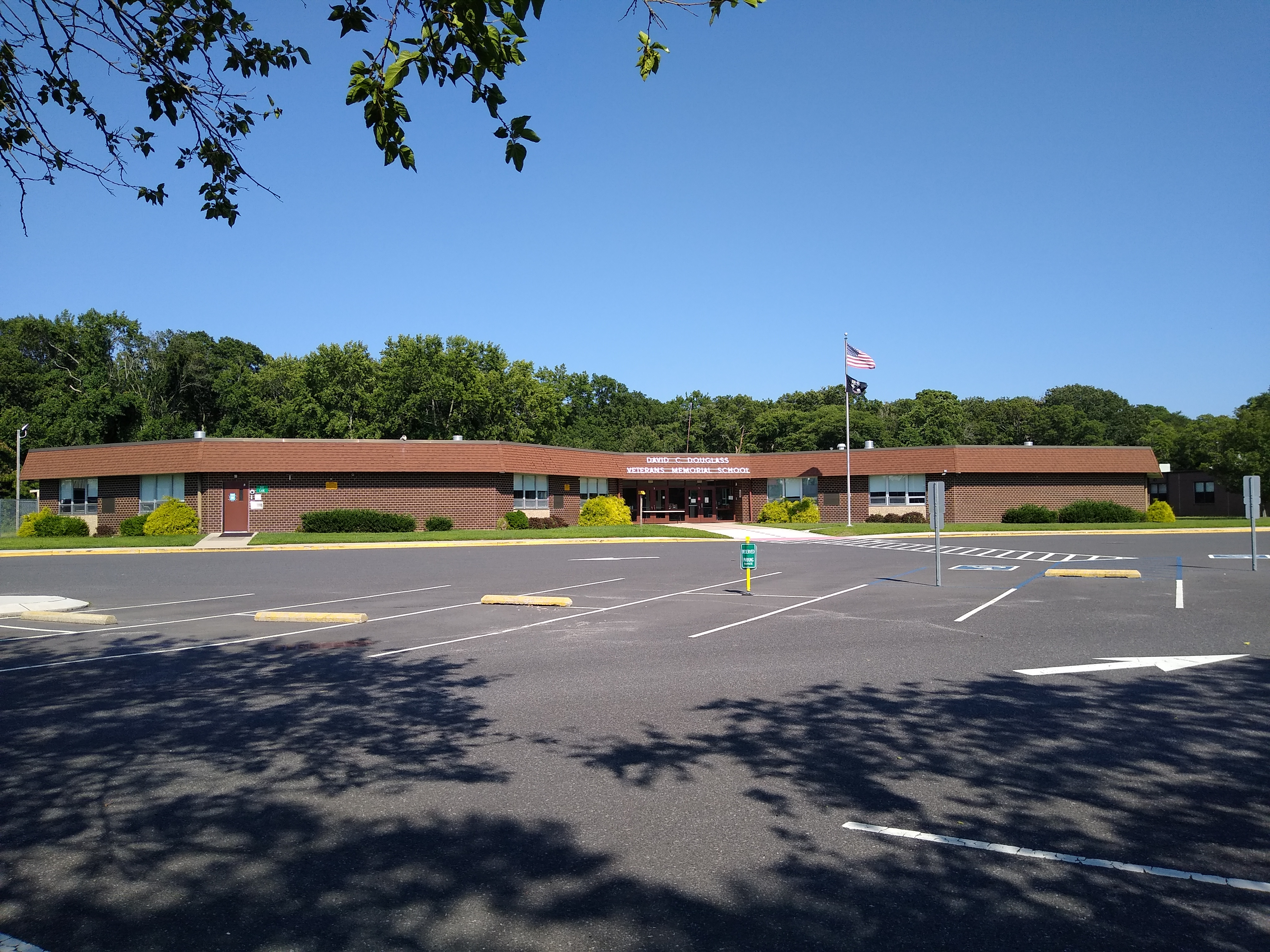
David C. Douglass Memorial School in Villas, which has preschool and kindergarten classes

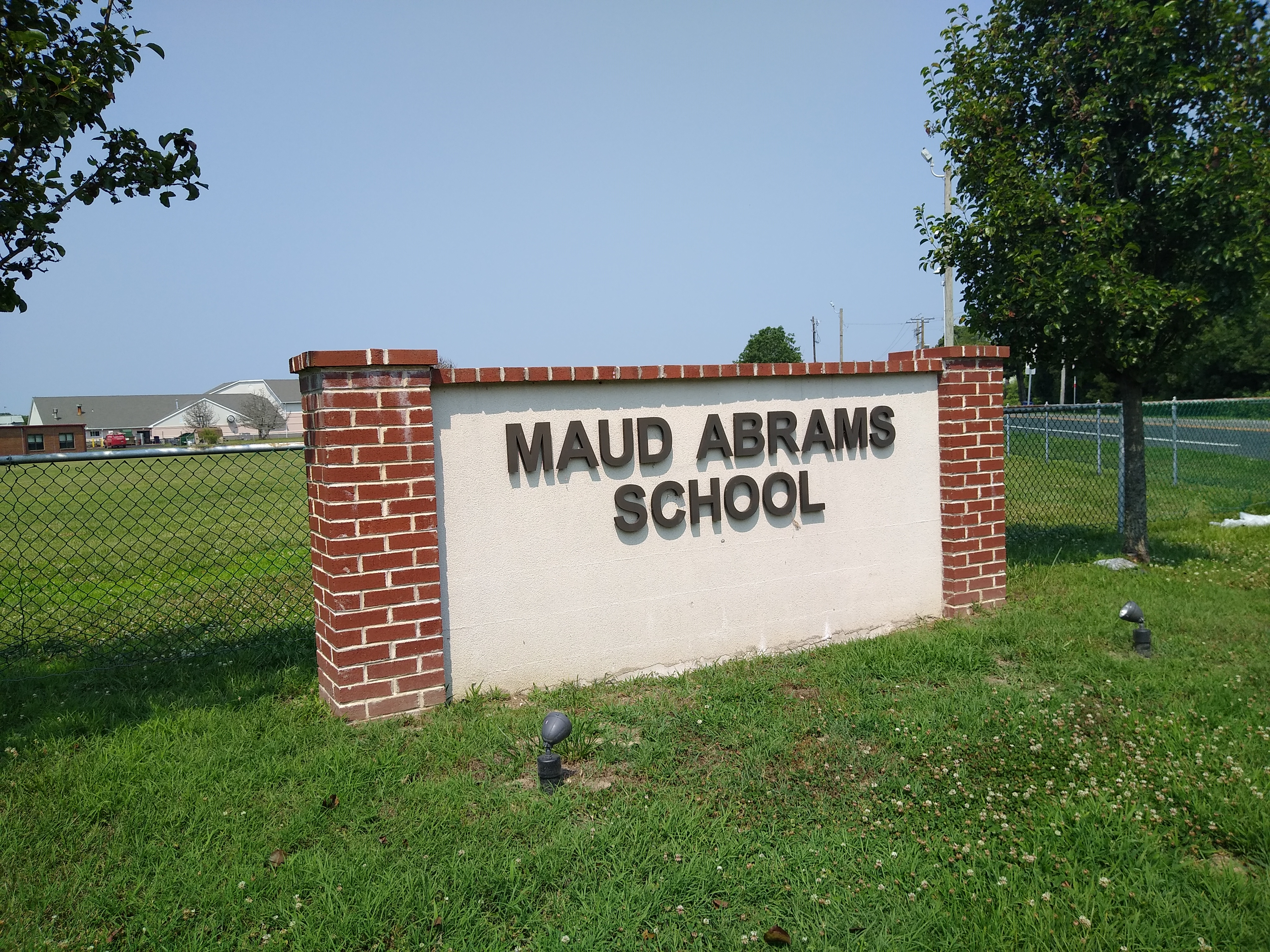
Maud Abrams School in Cold Spring, which houses grades 3-4

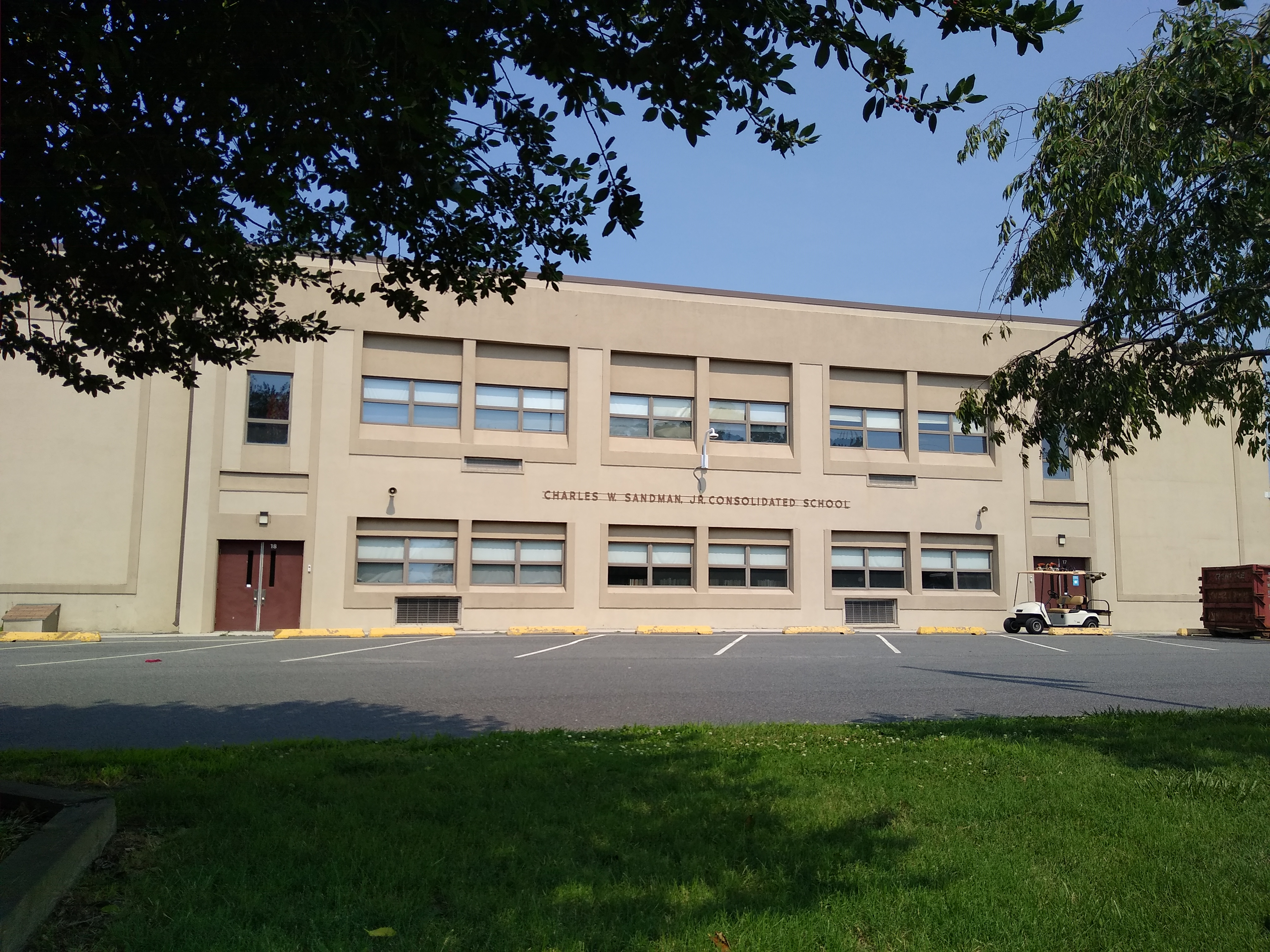
Charles W. Sandman Consolidated School in Cold Spring, which houses grades 5-6 (previously the administration building was next to it)

== Administration ==
Core members of the district's administration are:

- Van Cathcart, superintendent
- Katie Siciliano, business administrator and board secretary

== Board of education ==
The district's board of education is comprised of nine members who set policy and oversee the fiscal and educational operation of the district through its administration. As a Type II school district, the board's trustees are elected directly by voters to serve three-year terms of office on a staggered basis, with three seats up for election each year held (since 2012) as part of the November general election. The board appoints a superintendent to oversee the district's day-to-day operations and a business administrator to supervise the business functions of the district.
