= Cape May County Herald =

Weekly newspaper in New Jersey, US

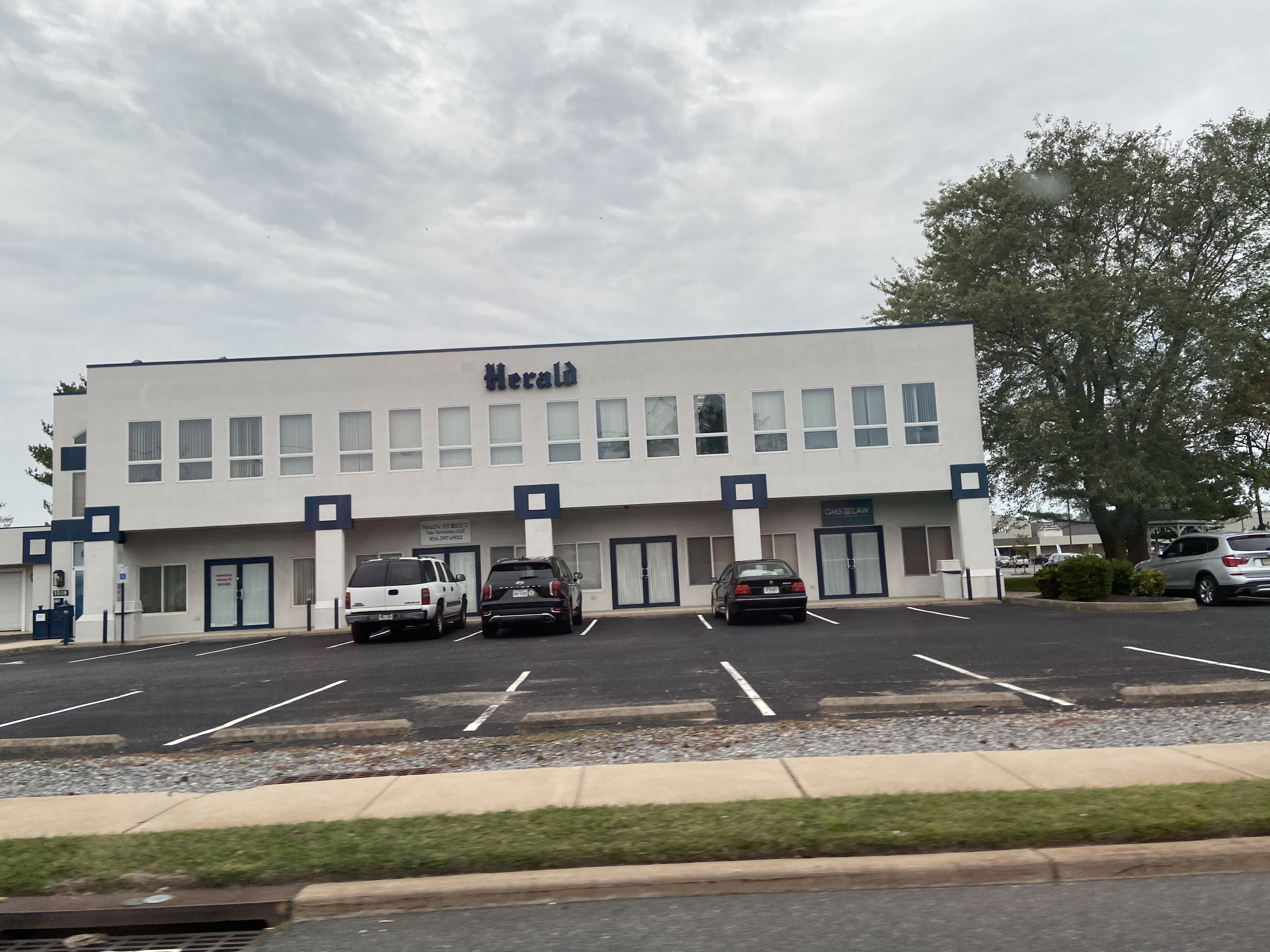
- Cape May County Herald headquarters
- Type: Weekly newspaper
- Owner: Seawave Corporation
- Publisher: Arthur R. Hall
- Founded: 1968
- Headquarters: 1508 Route 47, Rio Grande, NJ
- Website: capemaycountyherald.com

The Cape May County Herald is a weekly newspaper in Rio Grande, New Jersey.

== History ==
It has been serving residents and visitors of Cape May County, New Jersey, United States, since 1968. The newspaper offers in-depth local coverage of news and events in print and online. The newspaper's online edition provides a comprehensive guide and directory of Cape May and local classified advertising.

The Herald is also the creator of the Digital Press Consortium, a technology consortium of community newspapers that creates software and tools for the community newspaper industry.
