= Lower Cape May Regional School District =

School district in Cape May County, New Jersey, US

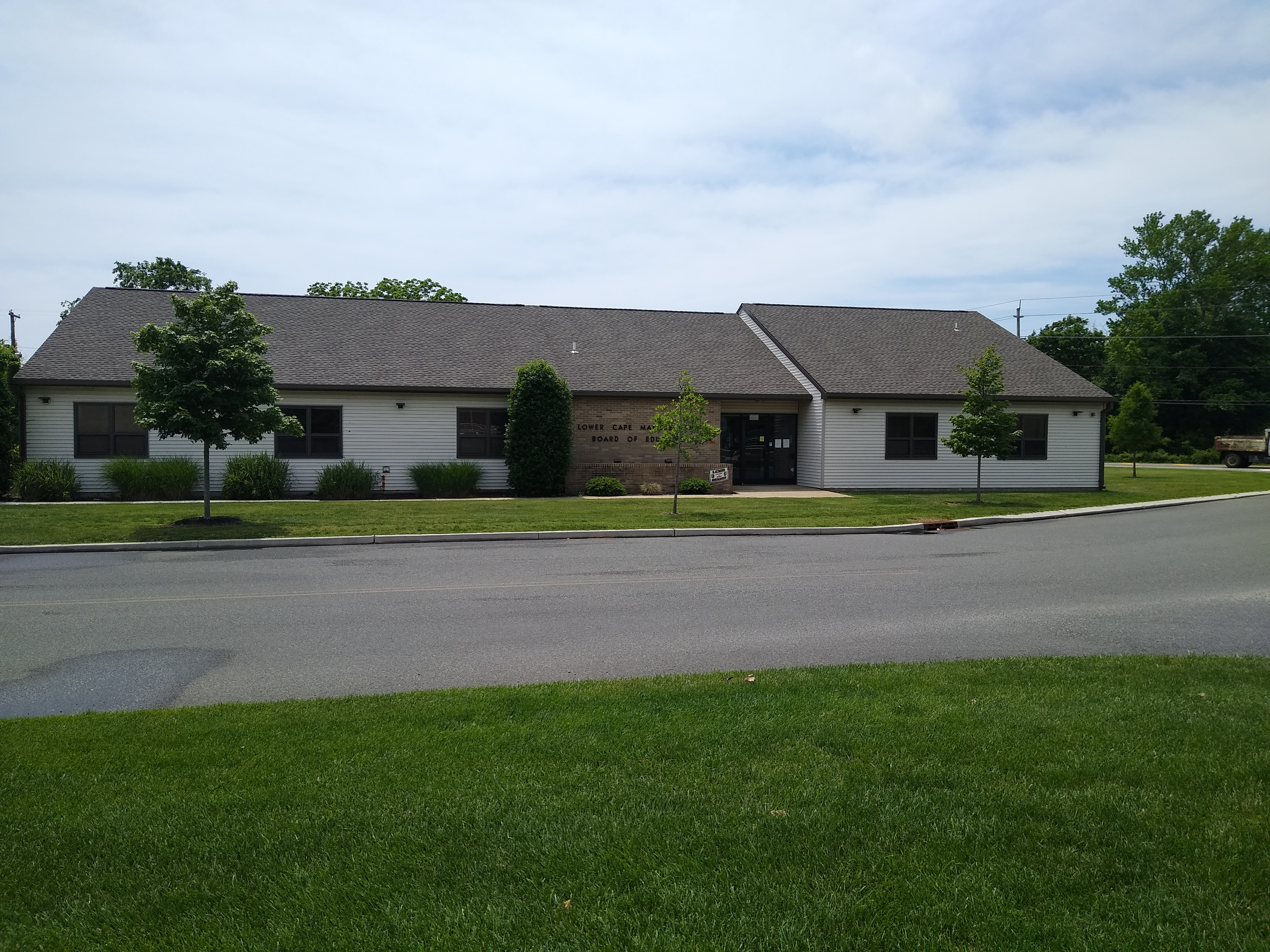
- School district administrative offices

Address
- 687 Route 9 Cape May, Cape May County, New Jersey, 08204; United States
- Coordinates: 38.9791°N 74.9070°W

District information
- Grades: 7-12
- Superintendent: Gregory Lasher
- Business administrator: Mark Mallett
- Schools: 2

Students and staff
- Enrollment: 1,225 (as of 2022–23)
- Faculty: 106.4 FTEs
- Student–teacher ratio: 11.5:1

Other information
- District Factor Group: B
- Website: lcmrschooldistrict.com
Ind.	Per pupil	District spending	Rank (*)	9-12 average	%± vs. average
1A	Total Spending	$21,740	29	$18,891	15.1%
1	Budgetary Cost	16,118	24	14,586	10.5%
2	Classroom Instruction	9,539	31	8,339	14.4%
6	Support Services	1,959	13	2,114	−7.3%
8	Administrative Cost	1,662	24	1,561	6.5%
10	Operations & Maintenance	2,044	26	1,798	13.7%
13	Extracurricular Activities	641	11	673	−4.8%
16	Median Teacher Salary	70,413	27	65,769
Data from NJDoE 2014 Taxpayers' Guide to Education Spending. *Of 9-12 districts with any number of students. Lowest spending=1; Highest=47

The Lower Cape May Regional School District (LCMR School District) is regional public school district headquartered in Lower Township, in the U.S. state of New Jersey, that serves students in seventh through twelfth grades from four communities in Cape May County, including Cape May City, Lower Township and West Cape May, with students from Cape May Point attending as part of a sending/receiving relationship.

As of the 2022–23 school year, the district, comprised of two schools, had an enrollment of 1,225 students and 106.4 classroom teachers (on an FTE basis), for a student–teacher ratio of 11.5:1.

The district is classified by the New Jersey Department of Education as being in District Factor Group "B", the second lowest of eight groupings. District Factor Groups organize districts statewide to allow comparison by common socioeconomic characteristics of the local districts. From lowest socioeconomic status to highest, the categories are A, B, CD, DE, FG, GH, I and J.

== History ==
The district was established in 1956. When the district was established, municipalities paid in proportion to how many students attended from each municipality. In 1975 the State of New Jersey established a new regional school district taxing regimen based on property values instead. This led to political conflict between the City of Cape May, which had relatively few students but pays a disproportionate share of the taxation revenue, versus Lower Township.

In January 1995 residents of the district voted in favor of a $4.99 million bond to expand the district facilities.

In 2014, the city of Cape May contributed $6.5 million in property taxes to cover the 67 students from the city attending the district, an average of $97,300 per student. Cape May officials have argued that the district's funding formula based on assessed property values unfairly penalizes Cape May, which has higher property values and a smaller number of high school students as a percentage of the population than the other constituent districts, especially Lower Township; Cape May has 6% of students while its share of property taxes for the district is one third. A change to base contributions on the number of students would cut property taxes in Cape May by $1,250 per home and in West Cape May by almost $1,100, while taxes for the average homeowner in Lower Township would increase by more than $400. In 2012, Cape May contributed $6 million in property taxes and sent 120 students to the regional district, an average of $50,000 per student. In 2013, the district received a proposal that had been prepared for the Cape May City Council that addressed concerns that the city's property tax base meant that it was paying a disproportionate share of the district's tax levy. Cape May raised possible means in which the imbalance could be addressed.

In 2013, the Lower Cape May Regional School District received a feasibility study that would look at ways to reconfigure the district. The study considered Cape May City withdrawing from the regional district or the dissolution of the district, converting the existing PreK-6 Lower Township School District to serve PreK-12, as the regional district's school facilities are located in the township. Cape May City and West Cape May could see annual savings approaching a combined $6 million from the dissolution.

in 2013 Richard Degener of The Press of Atlantic City wrote that the city government of Cape May "has been complaining for years about the city's share of the costs, and City Council recently hired an attorney to study the issue." In 2013, the city government asked the Cape May County Board of Education to have city voters vote on a new tax rate but the county board declined. In 2014, Degener stated that the city government of Cape May "is trying to leave the school system over what it claims are excessive costs".

Superintendent Chris Kobik retired in 2019.

== Schools and facilities ==
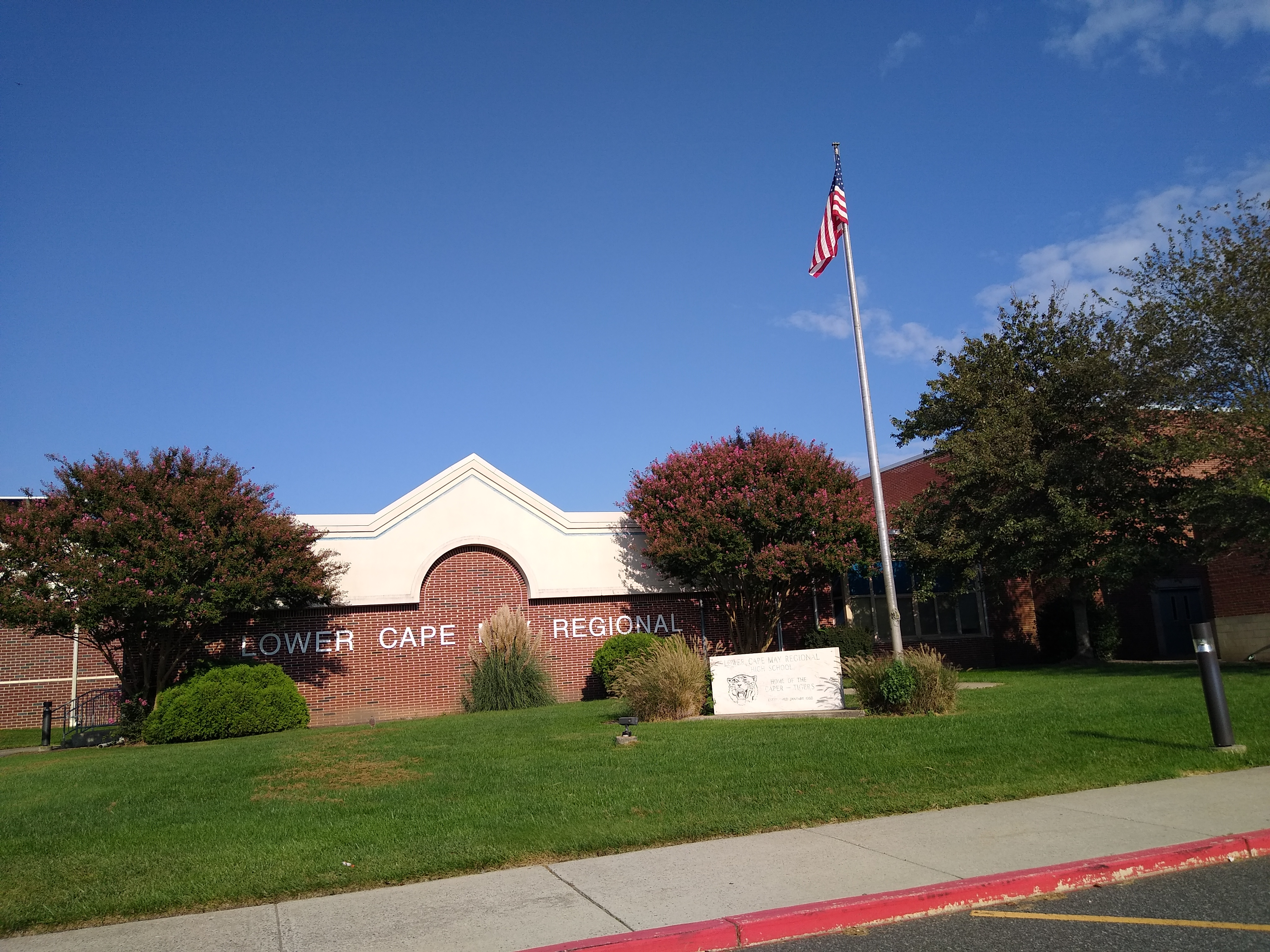
Lower Cape May Regional High School

Schools in the district (with 2022–23 enrollment data from the National Center for Education Statistics) are:

- Richard M. Teitelman Middle School with 433 students in grades 7 and 8. The school facility has a capacity of 701 students.
  - Pete Daly, principal
- Lower Cape May Regional High School with 757 students in grades 9-12
  - Lawrence Ziemba, principal

The LCMR district describes its facilities as being in Erma, with the postal address being "Cape May, New Jersey"; the schools are not in the Erma census-designated place. The Cape May County Herald, and the Press of Atlantic City describe the school complex as being in Erma.

The district's campus covers 65 acres (26 ha).

== Administration ==
Core members of the district's administration are:

- Gregory Lasher, superintendent
- Mark Mallett, business administrator and board secretary

== Board of education ==
The district's board of education is comprised of nine members who set policy and oversee the fiscal and educational operation of the district through its administration. As a Type II school district, the board's trustees are elected directly by voters to serve three-year terms of office on a staggered basis, with three seats up for election each year held (since 2012) as part of the November general election. The board appoints a superintendent to oversee the district's day-to-day operations and a business administrator to supervise the business functions of the district. Seats on the board are allocated based on population, with Lower Township assigned seven seats and Cape May and West Cape May assigned one seat each.

== Tax funding ==
The respective taxation rates differ for each of the three constituent municipalities (Cape May City, Lower Township, West Cape May Borough). The formulas are derived from annual property evaluations, originating from a New Jersey state taxation formula. In 2012 the share of the budget was as follows: Lower Township: 57.6%, Cape May City, 34.2%, and West Cape May 8.3%. For 2013 it changed to Lower Township: 60.7%, Cape May City: 32.5%, and West Cape May: 6.8%.

As of 2014 Cape May contributed about one third of the LCMR budget.

The district commissioned a company in Atlantic City, New Jersey to make an official LCMR flag with one for special events. A second was taken by an employee to Iraq, where he was called as a reservist.

== Student body ==
In the 2008–2009 school year the LCMR district had 1,602 students from Lower Township. In the 2012–2013 school year the LCMR district had 1,356 students from Lower Township. The decline in the students from Lower Township was the primary reason for the decline in enrollment in LCMR schools.

Circa 2007–2012, the numbers of students from the Cape May School District attending LCMR schools ranged between 70 and 85, and the number of students from West Cape May School District for that period ranged between 45 and 58. Circa 2014 Cape May City had above 5% of the district's students.

In 2014, Cape May Point did not send any students to LCMR schools.
