= Lower Cape May Regional High School =

High school in Cape May County, New Jersey, US

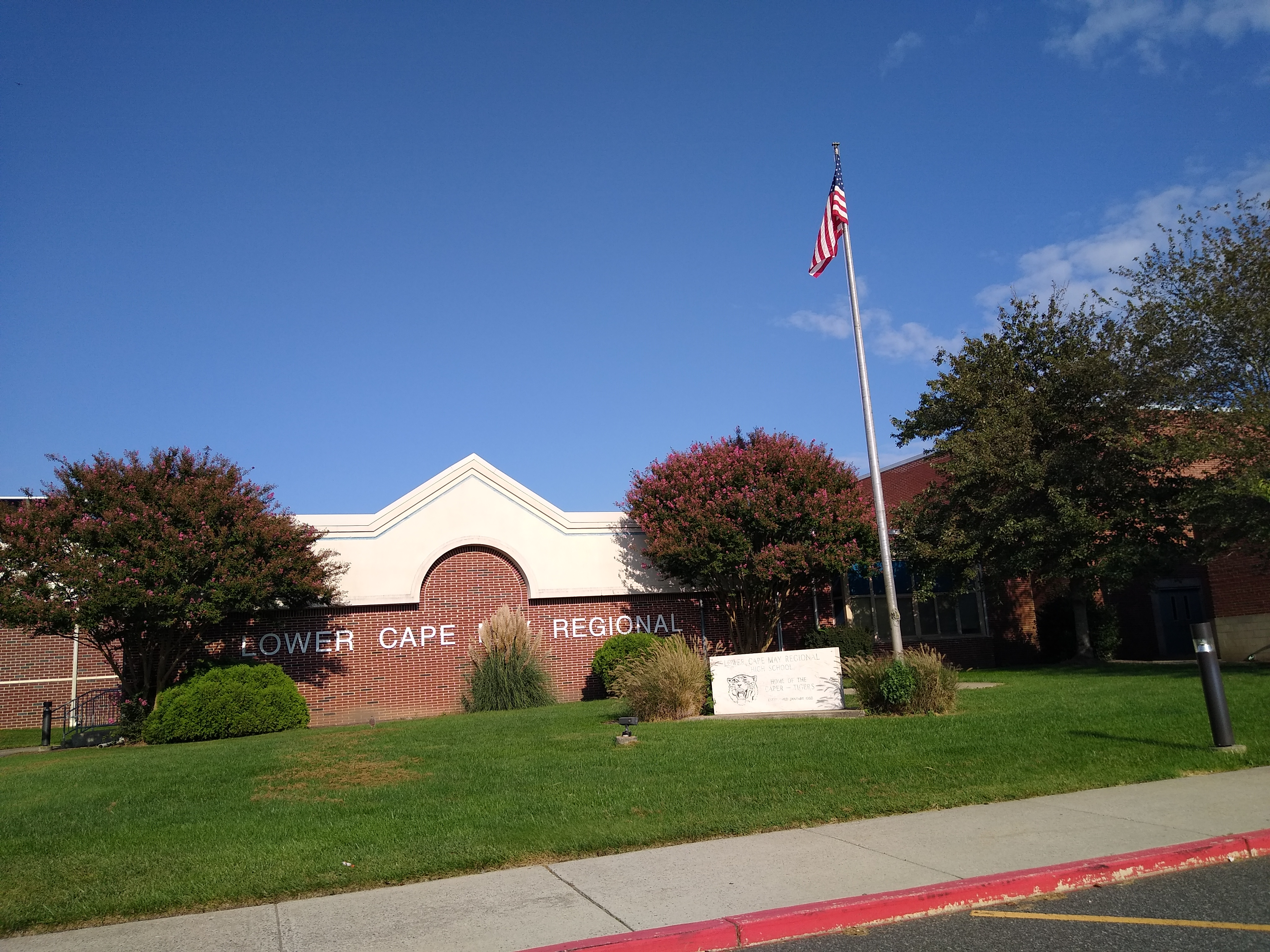

Location
- 687 Route 9 Cape May, Cape May County, New Jersey 08204; United States; 38.982458°N 74.903753°W

Information
- Type: Public high school
- Established: 1961
- School district: Lower Cape May Regional School District
- NCES School ID: 340909001720
- Principal: Lawrence Ziemba
- Faculty: 59.4 FTEs
- Grades: 9-12
- Enrollment: 717 (as of 2024–25)
- Student to teacher ratio: 12.1:1
- Colors: Columbia blue and black
- Athletics conference: Cape-Atlantic League (general); West Jersey Football League (football)
- Mascot: Tiger
- Team name: Caper Tigers
- Website: www.lcmrschooldistrict.com/lcmr/index.php

The Lower Cape May Regional High School (LCMRHS) is a four-year comprehensive public high school located in Lower Township, in Cape May County, in the U.S. state of New Jersey, operating as part of the Lower Cape May Regional School District. LCMRHS serves students in ninth through twelfth grades from four communities in Cape May County as part of the Lower Cape May Regional School District, which includes Lower Township, Cape May, West Cape May, and Cape May Point; students from Cape May Point attend the district as part of a sending/receiving relationship.

As of the 2024–25 school year, the school had an enrollment of 717 students and 59.4 classroom teachers (on an FTE basis), for a student–teacher ratio of 12.1:1. There were 278 students (38.8% of enrollment) eligible for free lunch and 60 (8.4% of students) eligible for reduced-cost lunch.

== History ==
LCMRHS replaced the former Cape May High School, which closed effective December 22, 1960. The Cape May superintendent, Paul W. Schmitdtchen, decided to create a new high school, and therefore he is considered the "father" of the school. In December 1958 the voters of Cape May City, West Cape May, and Lower Township approved borrowing $1.4 million (equivalent to $15.6 million in 2025) to build a new high school in Lower Township. Construction began in November 1959. The school district hired employees in April 1960. LCMRHS opened in 1961. The first class to graduate from LCMRHS was that of 1961.

In 2002, the school held a groundbreaking for a $12 million (the value of $21.5 million in 2025) addition covering 50,000 square feet (4,600 m^{2}), which included a new auditorium, as well as renovation of 24,381 square feet (2,265.1 m^{2}) of area.

The school's field house opened in 2017.

== Campus ==
The LCMR district describes its facilities as being in Erma, with the postal address being "Cape May, New Jersey"; the schools are not in the Erma census-designated place. The Cape May County Herald, and the Press of Atlantic City describe the school as being in Erma.

The school has a capacity of 1,266 students.

== Awards, recognition and rankings ==
The school was the 236th-ranked public high school in New Jersey out of 339 schools statewide in New Jersey Monthly magazine's September 2014 cover story on the state's "Top Public High Schools", using a new ranking methodology. The school had been ranked 243rd in the state of 328 schools in 2012, after being ranked 236th in 2010 out of 322 schools listed. The magazine ranked the school 205th in 2008 out of 316 schools. The school was ranked 185th in the magazine's September 2006 issue, which surveyed 316 schools across the state.

== Athletics ==
The Lower Cape May Regional High School Caper Tigers compete in the Atlantic Division of the Cape-Atlantic League, an athletic conference comprised of both parochial and public high schools located in Atlantic, Cape May, Cumberland and Gloucester counties, and operates under the aegis of the New Jersey State Interscholastic Athletic Association (NJSIAA). With 594 students in grades 10-12, the school was classified by the NJSIAA for the 2022–24 school years as Group II South for most athletic competition purposes. The football team competes in the Royal Division of the 94-team West Jersey Football League superconference and was classified by the NJSIAA as Group II South for football for 2024–2026, which included schools with 514 to 685 students.

The boys' wrestling team won the South Jersey Group III state sectional championship in 1982 and won the South Jersey Group II sectional title in 2024 and 2026.

In 2015, the girls' basketball team won the South Jersey Group II state sectional title with a 58-55 overtime win over Sterling High School, earning the program's first state championship.

== Administration ==
The school's principal is Lawrence Ziemba. His core administration team includes two vice principals and the athletic director.

== Student body ==
In 2012, there were 85 students of the high school living in Cape May City, which fell to 65 the following year.

== Notable alumni ==
- Bob Andrzejczak (born 1986, class of 2004), politician, member of the New Jersey General Assembly
- Thomas Cannuli, (born 1992, class of 2010), professional poker player, known for finishing 6th place in the 2015 WSOP Main Event and winning a WSOP bracelet in the $3,333 WSOP.com ONLINE No-Limit Hold'em High Roller
- Madie Gibson (born 1997), association footballer who plays as a forward or winger for League of Ireland club Athlone Town
- Chris Jay (born 1978, class of 1996), musician, screenwriter, actor and member of the band, Army of Freshmen
- Bill Pilczuk (born 1971, class of 1989), former 1998 World Champion swimmer and present head swim coach at Savannah College of Art and Design
- Matt Szczur (born 1989, class of 2007), former Major League Baseball player who played for the Chicago Cubs and San Diego Padres

== Notable faculty ==
- Ed Rubbert (born 1964), former football coach who played quarterback for the Washington Redskins
- Erik K. Simonsen, school athletic director who represents the 1st Legislative District in the New Jersey General Assembly
