= The Press of Atlantic City =

Newspaper in New Jersey

Coordinates: 39.397926°N 74.537716°W

- Front page of The Press of Atlantic City
- Type: Daily newspaper
- Format: Broadsheet
- Owner: Lee Enterprises
- Publisher: Paul Farrell
- Editor: W.F. Keough
- Founded: 1895 (as Daily Press)
- Language: American English
- Headquarters: 1201 New Road; Linwood, New Jersey 08221, U.S.
- Country: United States
- Circulation: 18,294 Daily (as of 2023)
- OCLC number: 45193174
- Website: pressofatlanticcity.com

Logo until 2015

The Press of Atlantic City is the fourth-largest daily newspaper in New Jersey. Originally based in Pleasantville, it is the primary newspaper for southeastern New Jersey and the Jersey Shore. The newspaper designated market runs from Waretown in southern Ocean County (exit 69 on the Garden State Parkway) down to Cape May (exit 0). It also reaches west to Cumberland County. The Press closed its printing facility in Pleasantville in 2014, at which time it outsourced printing to a facility in Freehold. That printing plant (owned by Gannett) closed in 2017, with most of the New Jersey printing and production operations consolidated in Gannett's Rockaway plant.

Coverage focuses largely on local and regional news, with limited state, national and international news appearing on the Nation & World page in the Money section. The Press also publishes various other products, including At The Shore, the area's entertainment guide. Presented in tabloid format, it is inserted in the paper each Thursday and an additional 20,000–40,000 copies are bulk dropped to key tourist locations throughout the year. Other specialty niche publications include Bliss, a twice-yearly bridal magazine; Real Estate Monthly; Summer Fun; The Atlantic County Living Guide; and The Cape May County Living Guide, among many others. Two branded editions of the paper, Press Extra and Sunday Saver, provide very limited coverage of the area.

Because The Press focuses on local issues, with an emphasis on local and school events – particularly high school sports – other daily papers have penetration in the area. These include The Philadelphia Inquirer, the Asbury Park Press, Cherry Hill's Courier-Post, and the Vineland Daily Journal. In recent years, the Press has begun covering college football.

== History ==
The newspaper was founded in 1895 by Walter Edge as the Atlantic City Daily Press. In 1930, the name of the paper was changed to the Atlantic City Press, and in 1971, the name was changed to The Press. In 1988, its name was changed again to The Press of Atlantic City, the name currently in use.

The paper was owned from 1951 to 1964 by Rolland L. Adams after the O'Neill estate sold 30% of the stock, until selling it to Abarta Corporation (owned by Adams' three sons-in-law), a privately owned Pittsburgh-based holding company largely known for Coca-Cola bottling, and oil and gas operations in Pennsylvania. On January 14, 2013, Abarta officials announced they were selling the paper to focus on their other business operations. On July 18, 2013, an asset purchase agreement was signed with BH Media, a Berkshire Hathaway subsidiary, for $9.6 million and the paper became wholly owned by BH Media on August 11, 2013. In 2014, BH Media bought the Current and Gazette newspapers. In 2015, BH Media bought Atlantic City Weekly. The newspapers were acquired by Lee Enterprises upon its purchase of BH Media in 2020.

Since April 3, 2023, the newspaper has published its print edition three days a week on Tuesdays, Thursdays and Saturdays. The print edition is also delivered by the U.S. Postal Service, rather than by newspaper carriers.

== Editions and subscription rates ==
The Press of Atlantic City is available in several formats. It is published in print and in several digital formats. In May 2013, the paper shifted from a traditional business model of separate paid subscriptions for print and digital, and created All Access Passes which give readers access to the news across all available platforms for one price. Current rates range from $16.50 a month for full digital access with Sunday home delivery or no home deliver, to $23.50 for seven-day print home delivery plus full digital access. The print newsstand rate is $1.00 for the daily edition, and $2.00 for Sunday. Prices are higher in Toms River and north.

On October 15, 2011, PressofAtlanticCity.com became a paid content website, and was the first daily newspaper site in New Jersey to request payment for access to its digital content. It is also available in a replica e-edition that allows viewers to see the entire paper digitally as it appears each day in print, along with page-turning technology and links. In addition to news and sports, both web editions have local auto, real estate and job pages within the respective sites. Readers may currently view up to five pages on a free trial, after which they are asked to subscribe.

== See also ==
- List of newspapers in New Jersey
