= Barbara Smith (disambiguation) =

Barbara Smith (born 1946) is an American lesbian feminist writer.

Barbara Smith may also refer to:

- Barbara Smith (actress) (born 1997), English actress
- Barbara B. Smith (1922–2010), president of the LDS Relief Society
- Barbara Dawson Smith (active since 1985), American writer
- Barbara Herrnstein Smith (born 1932), American literary critic and theorist
- Barbara Whiting Smith (1931–2004), American actress
- Barbara McIlvaine Smith (born 1950), Pennsylvania politician
- Barbara T. Smith (born 1931), American artist
- Barbara Lee Smith (born 1938), mixed media artist, writer, educator, and curator
- Barbara Smith Warner (born 1967), politician from the U.S. state of Oregon
- B. Smith (1949–2020), American restaurateur, model, author and television host
- Barbara Smith (activist) (1946–2015), Chicago activist
- Barbara Mae Smith (1910–1997), American stage and screen actress, better known as Barbara Woodell
- Barbie Smith, American figure skater
- Barbara Barnard Smith (1920–2021), American ethnomusicologist
- Barbara Ellen Smith (born 1951), American author, activist, and teacher
- Barbara Smith Conrad (1937–2017), née Smith, American opera singer
