= Cape May, New Jersey =

City in Cape May County, New Jersey, US

- City
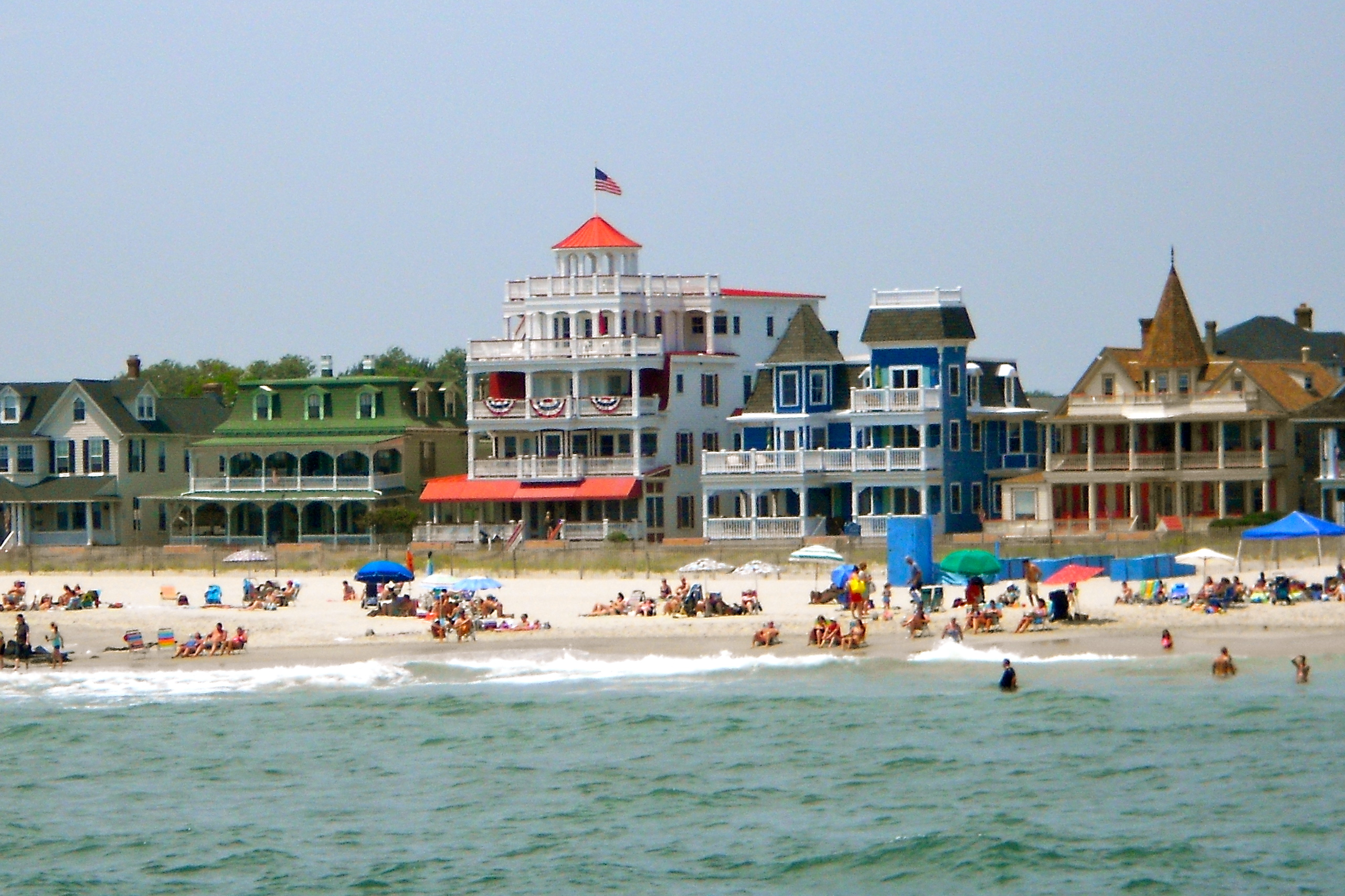
- Beach Avenue in Cape May seen from the sea

- Flag Seal
- Motto: The Nation's Oldest Seashore Resort
- Location of Cape May in Cape May County highlighted in red (left). Inset map: Location of Cape May County in New Jersey highlighted in orange (right).

- Census Bureau map of Cape May, New Jersey

- Location in Cape May County Location in New Jersey Location in the United States
- Coordinates: 38°56′00″N 74°55′17″W
- Country: United States
- State: New Jersey
- County: Cape May
- Incorporated: March 8, 1848, as Cape Island Borough
- Reincorporated: March 10, 1851, as Cape Island City
- Reincorporated: March 9, 1869, as Cape May City
- Named for: Cornelius Jacobsen Mey

Government
  - Type: Faulkner Act (council–manager)
  - Body: City Council
  - Mayor: Zachary Mullock (term ends December 31, 2028)
  - City manager: Paul E. Dietrich Sr.
  - Municipal clerk: Erin C. Burke

Area
  - Total: 2.90 sq mi (7.50 km^{2})
  - Land: 2.47 sq mi (6.41 km^{2})
  - Water: 0.42 sq mi (1.10 km^{2}) 14.59%
  - Rank: 341st of 565 in state 8th of 16 in county
- Elevation: 10 ft (3.0 m)

Population (2020)
  - Total: 2,768
  - Estimate (2023): 2,757
  - Rank: 457th of 565 in state 9th of 16 in county
  - Density: 1,119.2/sq mi (432.1/km^{2})
  - Rank: 370th of 565 in state 6th of 16 in county
- Time zone: UTC−05:00 (Eastern (EST))
  - Summer (DST): UTC−04:00 (Eastern (EDT))
- ZIP Code: 08204
- Area code: 609
- FIPS code: 3400910270
- GNIS feature ID: 0885178
- Website: www.capemaycity.com

Cape May, sometimes referred to as Cape May City, is a city and seaside resort located at the southern tip of Cape May Peninsula in Cape May County in the U.S. state of New Jersey. Located on the Atlantic Ocean near the mouth of the Delaware Bay, it is one of the country's oldest vacation resort destinations. The city, and all of Cape May County, is part of the Ocean City metropolitan statistical area, and is part of the Philadelphia metropolitan area. It is the southernmost municipality in New Jersey, and is part of the South Jersey region of the state.

As of the 2020 United States census, the city's resident population was 2,768, a decrease of 839 (−23.3%) from the 2010 census count of 3,607, which in turn reflected a decline of 427 (−10.6%) from the 4,034 counted in the 2000 census. In the summer, Cape May's population is expanded by as many as 40,000 to 50,000 visitors. The entire city of Cape May is designated the Cape May Historic District, a National Historic Landmark due to its concentration of Victorian architecture.

== History ==
=== 17th and 18th centuries ===
A Stroll along Beach Avenue, Cape May, New Jersey (Video 3:35)

The area that is now Cape May was originally inhabited by the Kechemeche Native American tribe, a subgroup of the Lenape people. The Kechemeche first encountered Europeans around 1600. The city is named after the Dutch captain Cornelius Jacobsen Mey, who charted the coast between 1611 and 1614 and claimed it for the province of New Netherland. It was later settled by colonists from the New Haven Colony in New England.

By the mid-18th century, Cape May had become a popular vacation destination for visitors from Philadelphia and is recognized as the country's oldest seaside resort.

=== 19th century ===
Following the construction of Congress Hall in 1816, Cape May became increasingly popular in the 19th century and was considered one of America's finest resorts by the 20th century.

What is now Cape May was formed as the borough of Cape Island by the New Jersey Legislature on March 8, 1848, from portions of Lower Township. It was reincorporated as Cape Island City on March 10, 1851, and was renamed Cape May City on March 9, 1869.

Tourism to the city was boosted in 1863 with the opening of the Tuckahoe and Cape May Railroad.

The city suffered devastating fires in 1869 and 1878. In the early hours of August 31, 1869, a fire broke out in the Japanese store on Washington Street. The fire destroyed the post office and at least thirty-five other buildings. Press reports at the time did not mention any deaths. In 1878, a five-day-long fire destroyed 30 blocks of the town center. Replacement homes were almost uniformly built in Victorian style, and more recent preservation efforts have left Cape May with many famously well-maintained Victorian houses—the second largest collection of such homes in the nation after San Francisco

The Cape May City Athletic Association was founded in 1886 and opened the Cape May Athletic Park in 1887. Cape May attracted the Philadelphia Phillies who held spring training in Cape May at the Athletic Park in 1888, the Gas House Field in 1891, and again at the Athletic Park in 1898. The Athletic Association fielded a collegiate baseball team that played every summer against other local clubs, as well as semi-professional and professional teams including African-American and Major League teams. President Benjamin Harrison visited Cape May in August 1891 and visited the Athletic Park where he saw Cape May lose 5 to 0 to the Gorham African-American club.

=== 20th century ===
During World War II, because of the submarine threat off the East Coast of the United States, particularly off Cape May and at the mouth of the Delaware Bay, numerous United States Navy facilities were established here in order to protect American coastal shipping. Cape May Naval facilities, listed below, played a significant role in reducing the number of ship and crew losses at sea.

- Naval Air Station, Cape May
- Naval Base, Cape May
- Inshore Patrol, Cape May
- Naval Annex, Inshore Patrol, Cape May
- Joint Operations Office, Naval Base, Cape May
- Welfare and Recreation Office, Cape May
- Dispensary, Naval Air Station, Cape May
- Naval Frontier Base, Cape May
- Degaussing Range (Cold Spring Inlet), Naval Base, Cape May
- Joint Operations Office, Commander Delaware Group, ESF, Cape May
- Anti-Submarine Attack Teacher Training Unit, U.S. Naval Base, Cape May
- Naval Annex, Admiral Hotel, Cape May

In 1976, Cape May, exclusive of the Coast Guard Training Center, was designated a National Historic Landmark as the Cape May Historic District, making it one of a few municipalities to be nearly entirely designated. That designation is intended to ensure the architectural preservation of these buildings.

== Geography ==
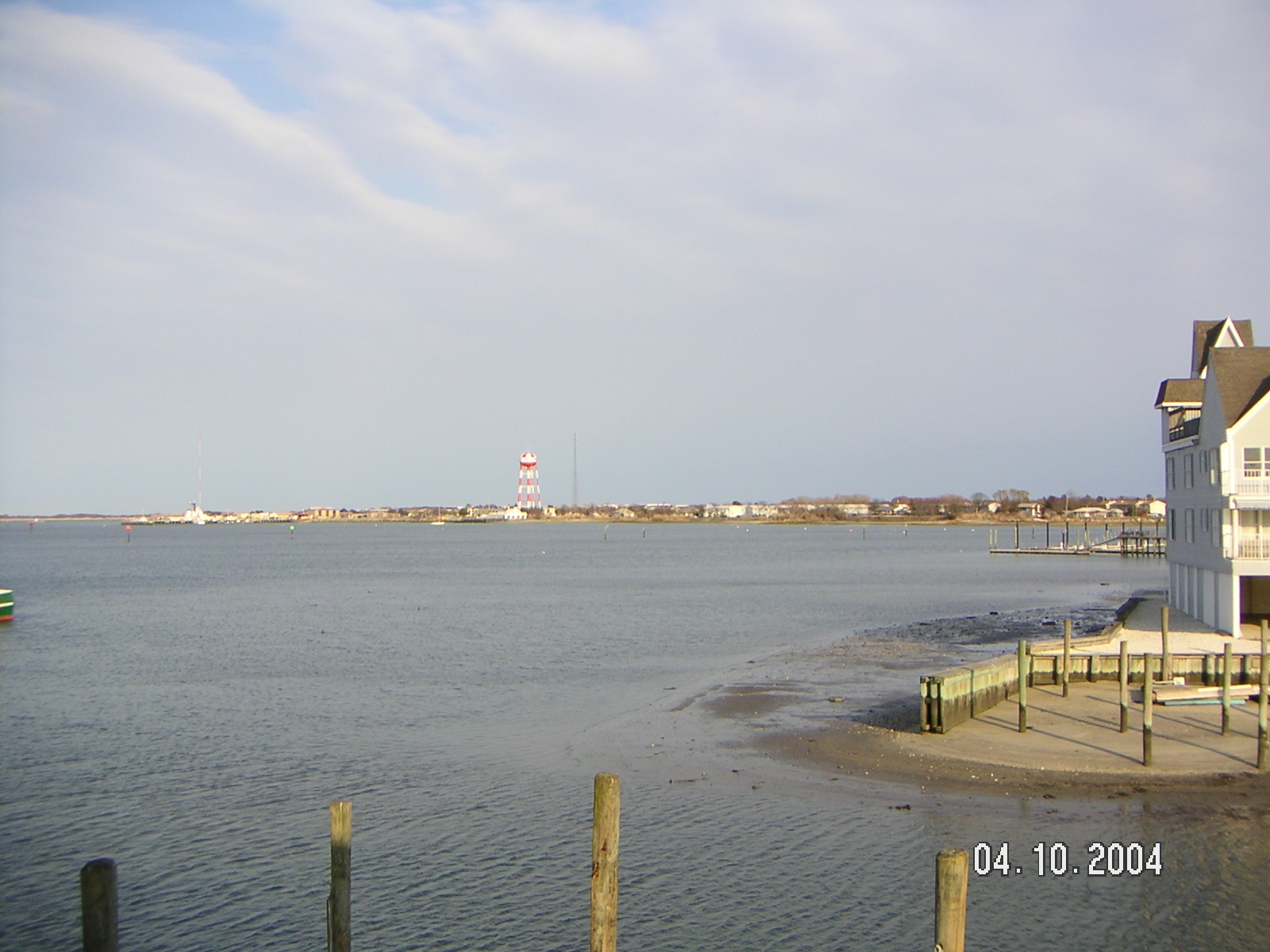
Cape May Harbor as seen from Devil's Reach

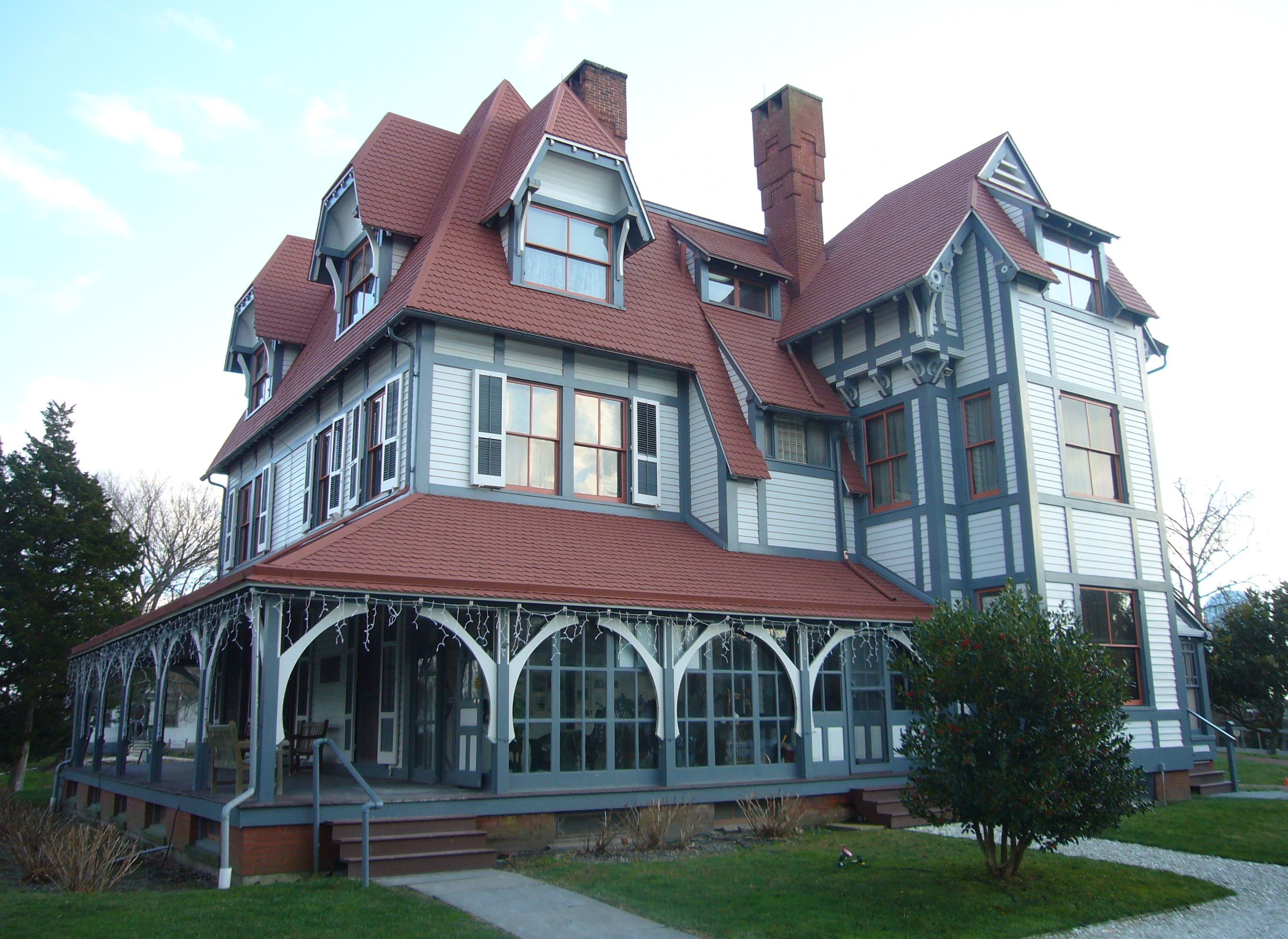
The Emlen Physick Estate in Cape May in 1879. Frank Furness was the architect of this Victorian house, which is now a museum located at 1048 Washington Street

According to the U.S. Census Bureau, Cape May had a total area of 2.90 square miles (7.50 km^{2}), including 2.47 square miles (6.41 km^{2}) of land and 0.42 square miles (1.10 km^{2}) of water (14.59%). Cape May is generally low-lying; its highest point, at the intersection of Washington and Jackson Streets, is 14 ft (4.3 m) above sea level.

Unincorporated communities, localities and place names located partially or completely within the city include Poverty Beach.

Cape May borders the Cape May County municipalities of Lower Township and West Cape May Borough and the Atlantic Ocean. The Cape May–Lewes Ferry provides transportation across the Delaware Bay between North Cape May, New Jersey, and Lewes, Delaware.

Cape May Harbor, which borders Lower Township and nearby Wildwood Crest allows fishing vessels to enter from the Atlantic Ocean, was created as of 1911, after years of dredging completed the harbor which covers 500 acres (200 ha). Cape May Harbor Fest celebrates life in and around the harbor, with the 2011 event commemorating the 100th anniversary of the harbor's creation.

Cape May is the southernmost point in New Jersey. It is at approximately the same latitude as Washington, D.C., and Arlington County, Virginia, and equidistant to Manhattan and Virginia.

=== Climate ===
According to the Köppen climate classification system, Cape May has a humid subtropical climate (Cfa) with hot, humid summers, cool winters and year-round precipitation. Its climate resembles that of its neighbor, the Delmarva Peninsula. During the summer months in Cape May, a cooling afternoon sea breeze is present on most days, but episodes of extreme heat and humidity can occur with heat index values at or above 95.0 °F (35.0 °C). During the winter months, episodes of extreme cold and wind can occur with wind chill values 0.0 °F (−17.8 °C). The hardiness zone of Cape May is 8a with an average annual extreme minimum air temperature of 10.8 °F (−11.8 °C). The average seasonal snowfall total is around 15 in (380 mm), and the average snowiest month is February which corresponds with the annual peak in nor'easter activity.

Climate data for Cape May 2 NW, New Jersey, 1991–2020 normals, extremes 1894–present
Month	Jan	Feb	Mar	Apr	May	Jun	Jul	Aug	Sep	Oct	Nov	Dec	Year
Record high °F (°C)	73 (23)	75 (24)	82 (28)	91 (33)	95 (35)	99 (37)	102 (39)	99 (37)	96 (36)	96 (36)	83 (28)	76 (24)	102 (39)
Mean maximum °F (°C)	61.1 (16.2)	62.7 (17.1)	70.8 (21.6)	80.8 (27.1)	87.0 (30.6)	92.3 (33.5)	94.9 (34.9)	93.0 (33.9)	88.7 (31.5)	81.8 (27.7)	71.2 (21.8)	63.6 (17.6)	96.2 (35.7)
Mean daily maximum °F (°C)	43.3 (6.3)	45.2 (7.3)	51.7 (10.9)	61.8 (16.6)	71.1 (21.7)	80.1 (26.7)	85.5 (29.7)	84.3 (29.1)	78.6 (25.9)	67.9 (19.9)	56.9 (13.8)	48.1 (8.9)	64.5 (18.1)
Daily mean °F (°C)	35.9 (2.2)	37.3 (2.9)	43.6 (6.4)	52.9 (11.6)	62.3 (16.8)	71.6 (22.0)	76.9 (24.9)	75.7 (24.3)	70.1 (21.2)	59.3 (15.2)	48.8 (9.3)	40.6 (4.8)	56.2 (13.4)
Mean daily minimum °F (°C)	28.5 (−1.9)	29.4 (−1.4)	35.4 (1.9)	44.1 (6.7)	53.5 (11.9)	63.0 (17.2)	68.3 (20.2)	67.2 (19.6)	61.7 (16.5)	50.7 (10.4)	40.6 (4.8)	33.0 (0.6)	47.9 (8.8)
Mean minimum °F (°C)	13.1 (−10.5)	15.5 (−9.2)	21.2 (−6.0)	32.2 (0.1)	40.7 (4.8)	51.1 (10.6)	59.3 (15.2)	57.2 (14.0)	48.0 (8.9)	35.7 (2.1)	25.9 (−3.4)	19.4 (−7.0)	10.8 (−11.8)
Record low °F (°C)	−2 (−19)	−1 (−18)	7 (−14)	22 (−6)	33 (1)	42 (6)	51 (11)	45 (7)	32 (0)	26 (−3)	14 (−10)	5 (−15)	−2 (−19)
Average precipitation inches (mm)	3.22 (82)	2.97 (75)	4.10 (104)	3.34 (85)	3.55 (90)	3.53 (90)	3.88 (99)	4.01 (102)	3.76 (96)	4.17 (106)	3.29 (84)	4.02 (102)	43.84 (1,114)
Average snowfall inches (cm)	4.5 (11)	5.7 (14)	2.5 (6.4)	0.1 (0.25)	0.0 (0.0)	0.0 (0.0)	0.0 (0.0)	0.0 (0.0)	0.0 (0.0)	0.0 (0.0)	0.0 (0.0)	2.0 (5.1)	14.8 (38)
Average precipitation days (≥ 0.01 in)	10.6	10.7	11.7	11.3	11.3	10.1	10.0	8.9	9.0	9.6	9.4	11.2	123.8
Average snowy days (≥ 0.1 in)	2.9	3.0	1.2	0.1	0.0	0.0	0.0	0.0	0.0	0.0	0.0	1.2	8.4
Source: NOAA

Climate data for North Cape May, NJ Ocean Water Temperature (4 NW Cape May)
Month	Jan	Feb	Mar	Apr	May	Jun	Jul	Aug	Sep	Oct	Nov	Dec	Year
Daily mean °F (°C)	42 (6)	40 (4)	45 (7)	52 (11)	59 (15)	68 (20)	73 (23)	76 (24)	72 (22)	61 (16)	52 (11)	42 (6)	57 (14)
Source: NOAA

=== Ecology ===
According to the A. W. Kuchler U.S. potential natural vegetation types, Cape May would have a dominant vegetation type of Northern Cordgrass (73) with a dominant vegetation form of Coastal Prairie (20).

== Demographics ==
Historical population
Census	Pop.	Note	%±
1870	1,248		—
1880	1,699		36.1%
1890	2,136		25.7%
1900	2,257		5.7%
1910	2,471		9.5%
1920	2,999		21.4%
1930	2,637		−12.1%
1940	2,583		−2.0%
1950	3,607		39.6%
1960	4,477		24.1%
1970	4,392		−1.9%
1980	4,853		10.5%
1990	4,668		−3.8%
2000	4,034		−13.6%
2010	3,607		−10.6%
2020	2,768		−23.3%
2023 (est.)	2,757		−0.4%
Population sources: 1870–2000; 1870–1920 1870 1880–1890; 1890–1910 1910–1930; 1940–2000; 2010 2020

=== 2020 census ===
As of the 2020 census, Cape May had a population of 2,768. The median age was 58.3 years. 13.4% of residents were under the age of 18 and 39.4% of residents were 65 years of age or older. For every 100 females there were 86.1 males, and for every 100 females age 18 and over there were 87.1 males age 18 and over.

All residents lived in urban areas.

There were 1,382 households in Cape May, of which 15.8% had children under the age of 18 living in them. Of all households, 45.6% were married-couple households, 17.1% were households with a male householder and no spouse or partner present, and 33.7% were households with a female householder and no spouse or partner present. About 42.6% of all households were made up of individuals and 28.0% had someone living alone who was 65 years of age or older.

There were 4,157 housing units, of which 66.8% were vacant. The homeowner vacancy rate was 1.5% and the rental vacancy rate was 16.4%.

Racial composition as of the 2020 census
Race	Number	Percent
White	2,395	86.5%
Black or African American	76	2.7%
American Indian and Alaska Native	6	0.2%
Asian	22	0.8%
Native Hawaiian and Other Pacific Islander	0	0.0%
Some other race	99	3.6%
Two or more races	170	6.1%
Hispanic or Latino (of any race)	237	8.6%

=== 2010 census ===
The 2010 United States census counted 3,607 people, 1,457 households, and 782 families in the city. The population density was 1,500.6 per square mile (579.4/km^{2}). There were 4,155 housing units at an average density of 1,728.5 per square mile (667.4/km^{2}). The racial makeup was 89.05% (3,212) White, 4.85% (175) Black or African American, 0.30% (11) Native American, 0.67% (24) Asian, 0.11% (4) Pacific Islander, 2.30% (83) from other races, and 2.72% (98) from two or more races. Hispanic or Latino of any race were 8.62% (311) of the population.

Of the 1,457 households, 16.3% had children under the age of 18; 44.6% were married couples living together; 7.5% had a female householder with no husband present and 46.3% were non-families. Of all households, 42.0% were made up of individuals and 27.9% had someone living alone who was 65 years of age or older. The average household size was 1.95 and the average family size was 2.64.

12.8% of the population were under the age of 18, 20.6% from 18 to 24, 18.6% from 25 to 44, 20.3% from 45 to 64, and 27.6% who were 65 years of age or older. The median age was 42.2 years. For every 100 females, the population had 104.7 males. For every 100 females ages 18 and older there were 107.4 males.

The Census Bureau's 2006–2010 American Community Survey showed that (in 2010 inflation-adjusted dollars) median household income was $35,660 (with a margin of error of +/− $4,248) and the median family income was $50,846 (+/− $16,315). Males had a median income of $43,015 (+/− $20,953) versus $31,630 (+/− $22,691) for females. The per capita income for the city was $30,046 (+/− $4,010). About 2.2% of families and 4.8% of the population were below the poverty line, including 5.1% of those under age 18 and 7.1% of those age 65 or over.

=== 2000 census ===
As of the 2000 United States census, there were 4,034 people, 1,821 households, and 1,034 families residing in the city. The population density was 1,623.7 inhabitants per square mile (626.9/km^{2}). There were 4,064 housing units at an average density of 1,635.7 per square mile (631.5/km^{2}). The racial makeup of the city was 91.32% White, 5.26% African American, 0.20% Native American, 0.40% Asian, 0.05% Pacific Islander, 1.26% from other races, and 1.51% from two or more races. Hispanic or Latino of any race were 3.79% of the population.

There were 1,821 households, out of which 18.0% had children under the age of 18 living with them, 47.6% were married couples living together, 7.0% had a female householder with no husband present, and 43.2% were non-families. 39.4% of all households were made up of individuals, and 24.2% had someone living alone who was 65 years of age or older. The average household size was 2.02 and the average family size was 2.69.

In the city, the population was spread out, with 16.3% under the age of 18, 11.5% from 18 to 24, 19.8% from 25 to 44, 23.9% from 45 to 64, and 28.5% who were 65 years of age or older. The median age was 47 years. For every 100 females, there were 97.1 males. For every 100 females age 18 and over, there were 94.5 males.

The median income for a household in the city was $33,462, and the median income for a family was $46,250. Males had a median income of $29,194 versus $25,842 for females. The per capita income for the city was $29,902. About 7.7% of families and 9.1% of the population were below the poverty line, including 7.0% of those under age 18 and 10.9% of those age 65 or over.

== Economy ==
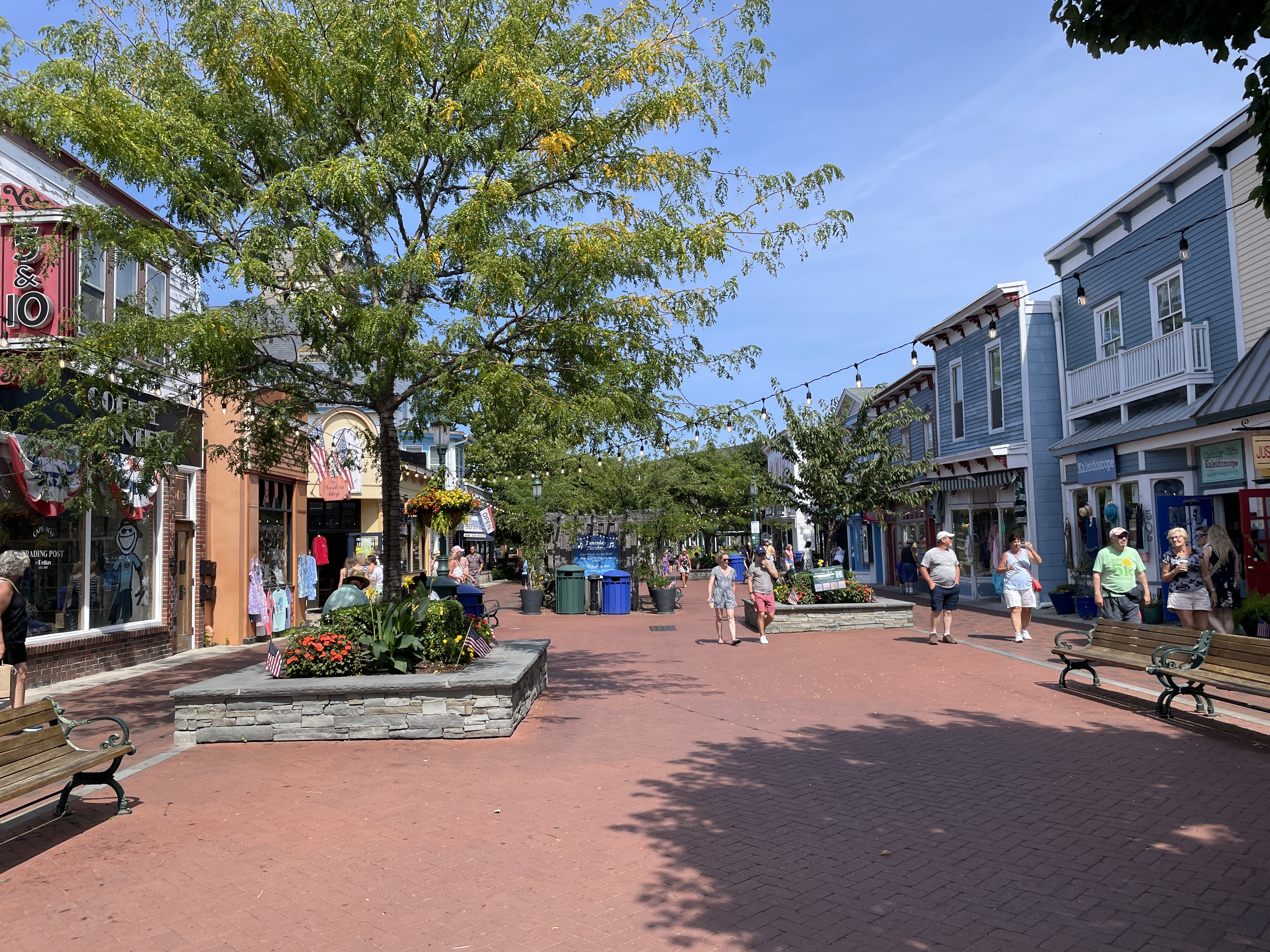
Shops at the Washington Street Mall in Downtown Cape May

Cape May welcome sign, a National Historic Landmark Resort

Tourism is Cape May's largest industry. The economy runs on the Washington Street Mall and includes shops, restaurants, lodgings, and tourist attractions including the Cape May boardwalk. Many historic hotels and B&Bs are located in Cape May, and commercial and sport fishing is a significant component of its economy.

Cove Beach, located at Cape May southernmost tip, hosts hundreds of swimmers, sunbathers, surfers, and hikers daily during summer months.

Cape May has been a popular resort for French Canadian tourists for several decades. Cape May County established a tourism office in Montreal, Quebec, but around 1995 it closed due to budget cuts. By 2010, the tourism office of Cape May County established a French language coupon booklet.

Prior to the 1980s, many temporary seasonal workers originated from the Philadelphia and, to a lesser extent, the New York City areas. That decade, there had been a wave of temporary workers from Ireland. By 2004, an improvement in the Irish economy meant that not as many Irish people came in that role, and that many of the temporary workers were now from Eastern Europe.

== Arts and culture ==
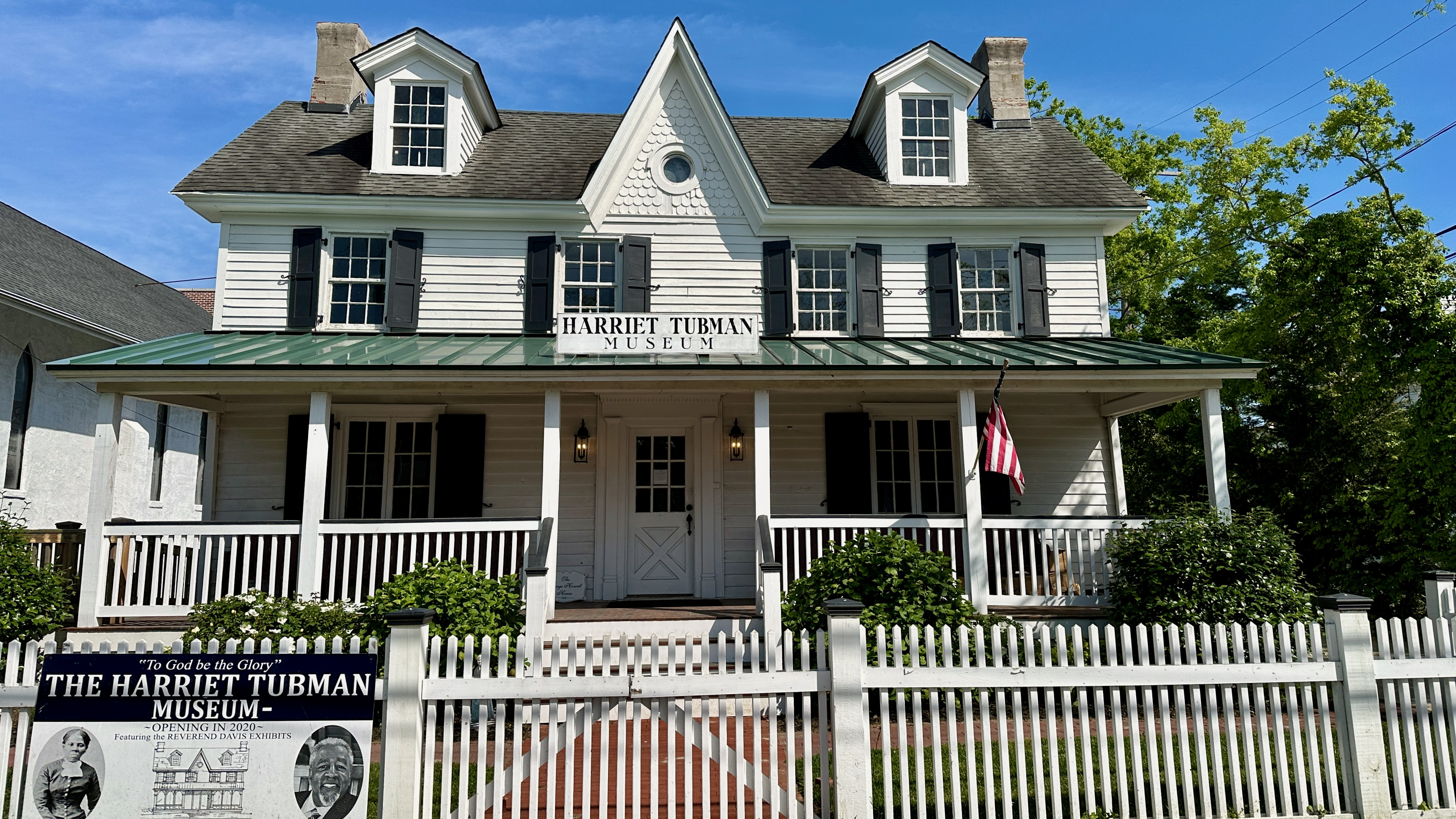
The Harriet Tubman Museum in Cape May

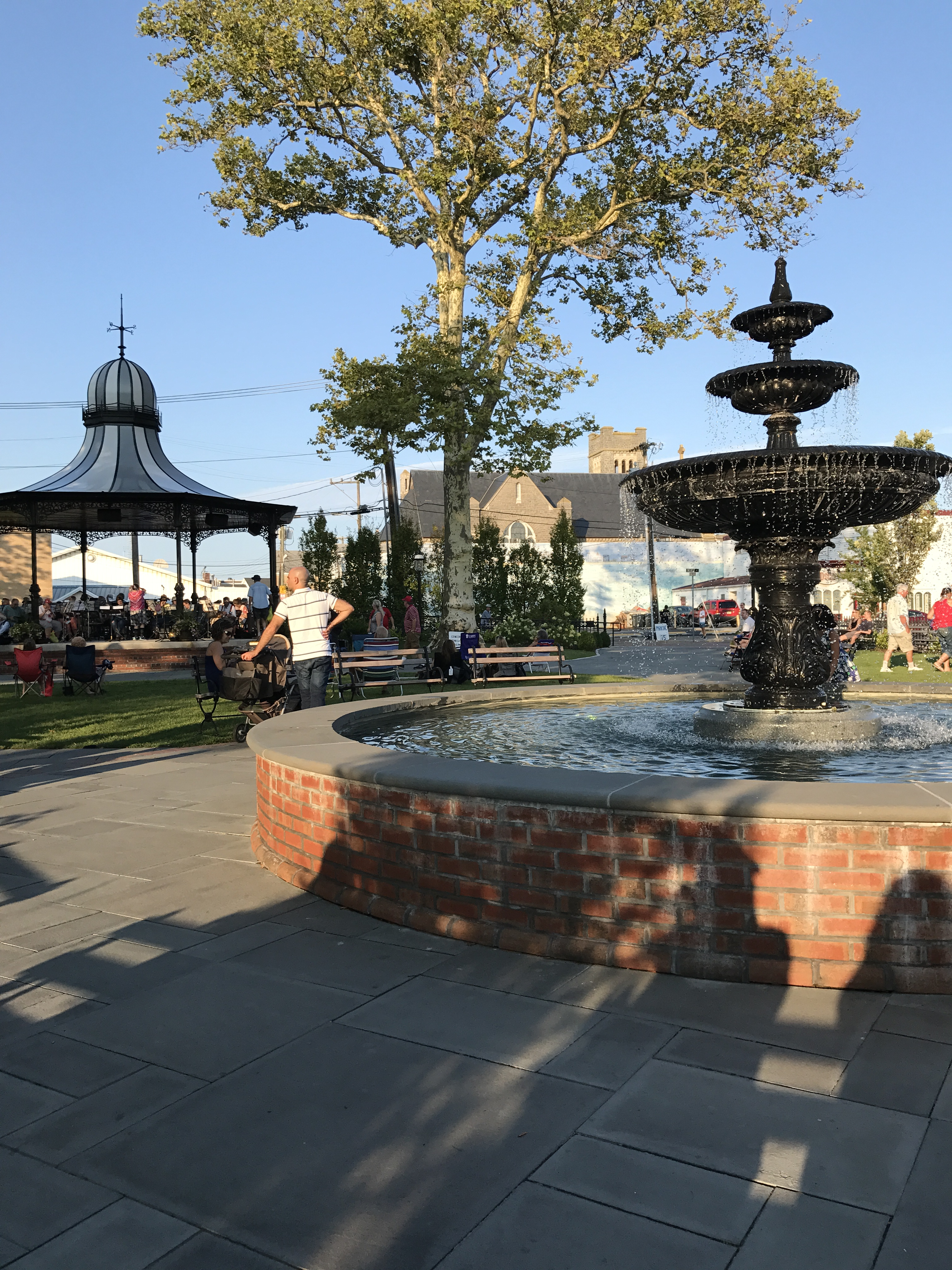
Cape May Rotary Park

Cape May has become known both for its Victorian gingerbread homes and its cultural offerings. The town hosts the Cape May Jazz Festival, the Cape May Music Festival and the Cape May, New Jersey Film Festival. Cape May Stage, an Equity theater founded in 1988, performs at the Robert Shackleton Playhouse on the corner of Bank and Lafayette Streets. East Lynne Theater Company, an Equity professional company specializing in American classics and world premieres, has its mainstage season from June–December and March, with school residencies throughout the year. Cape May is home to the Mid-Atlantic Center for the Arts & Humanities (MAC), established in 1970 by volunteers who succeeded in saving the 1879 Emlen Physick Estate from demolition. MAC offers a wide variety of tours, activities and events throughout the year for residents and visitors and operates three Cape May area historic sites—the 1879 Emlen Physick Estate, the Cape May Lighthouse and the World War II Lookout Tower. The Center for Community Arts (CCA) offers African American history tours of Cape May, arts programs for young people and is transforming the historic Franklin Street School, constructed in 1928 to house African-American students in a segregated school, into a Community Cultural Center.

Cape May is the home of Cape May diamonds, which show up at Sunset Beach and other beaches in the area. These are in fact clear quartz pebbles that wash down from the Delaware River. They begin as prismatic quartz (including the color sub-varieties such as smoky quartz and amethyst) in the quartz veins alongside the Delaware River that get eroded out of the host rock and wash down 200 miles to the shore. Collecting Cape May diamonds is a popular pastime and many tourist shops sell them polished or even as faceted stones.

The Cape May area is also world-famous for the observation of migrating birds, especially in the fall. With over 400 bird species having been recorded in this area by hundreds of local birders, Cape May is arguably the top bird-watching area in the entire Northeastern United States. The Cape May Warbler, a small songbird, takes it name from this location. The Cape May Bird Observatory is based nearby at Cape May Point.

Cape May is also a destination for marine mammal watching. Several species of whales and dolphins can be seen in the waters of the Delaware Bay and Atlantic Ocean, many within 10 mi (16 km) of land, due to the confluence of fresh and saltwater that make for a nutrient rich area for marine life. Whale and dolphin watching cruises are a year-round attraction in Cape May, part of an ecotourism / agritourism industry that generated $450 million in revenue in the county, the most of any in the state.

The Harriet Tubman Museum in downtown Cape May features the life and work of Harriet Tubman, an abolitionist and social activist.

=== Fisherman's Memorial ===
Cape May Fisherman's Memorial, located at Baltimore and Missouri Avenues, was built in 1988. It features a circular plaza reminiscent of a giant compass, a granite statue of a mother and two small children looking out to Harbor Cove, and a granite monument listing the names of 75 local fishermen who died at sea. The names begin with Andrew Jeffers, who died in 1893, and include the six people who died in March 2009 with the sinking of the scalloping boat Lady Mary. The granite statue was designed by Heather Baird with Jerry Lynch. The memorial is maintained by the City of Cape May and administered by the Friends of the Cape May Fisherman's Memorial. Visitors often leave a stone or seashell on the statue's base in tribute to the fishermen.

== Government ==
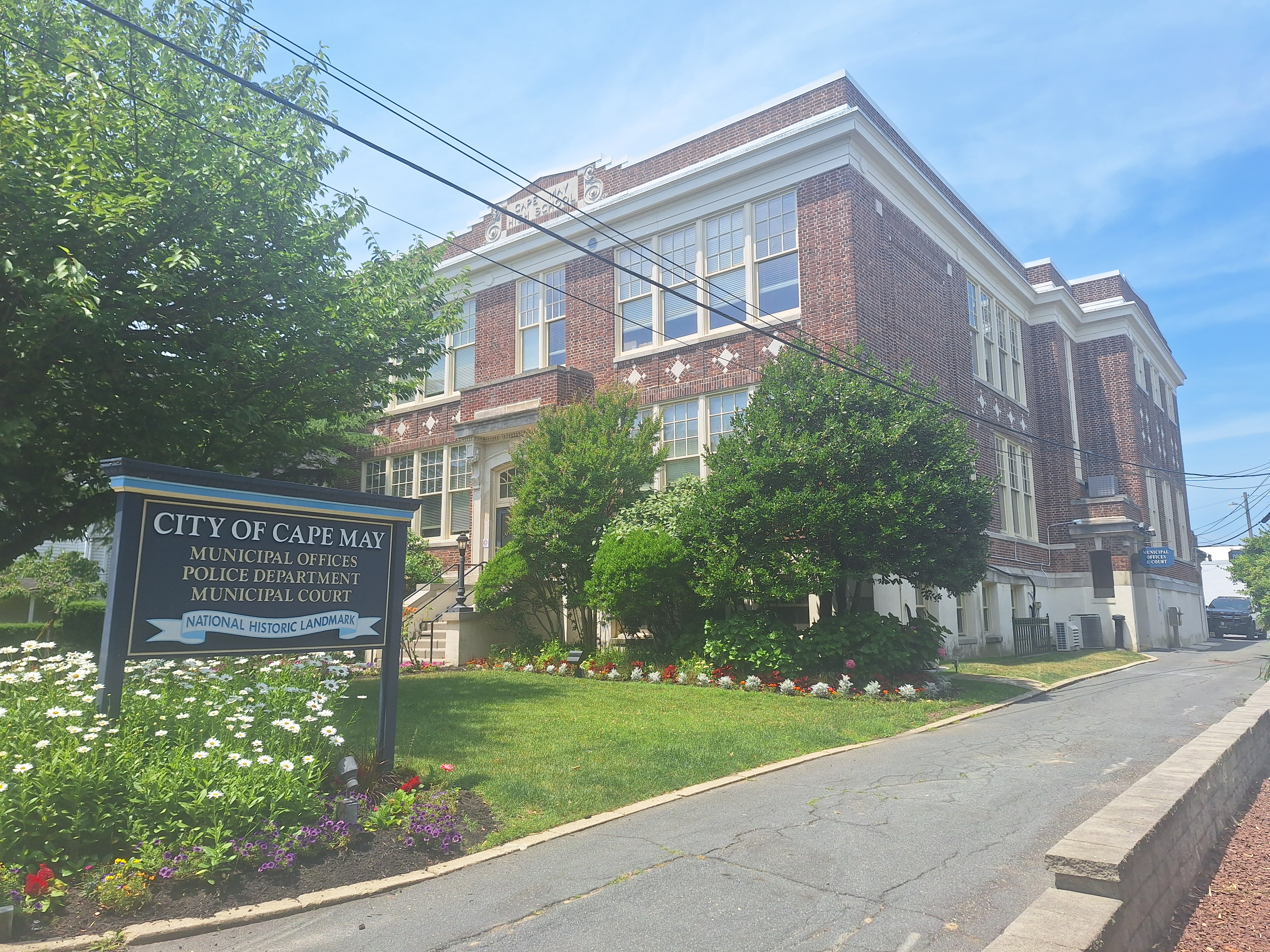
Cape May Municipal Office was originally Cape May High School.

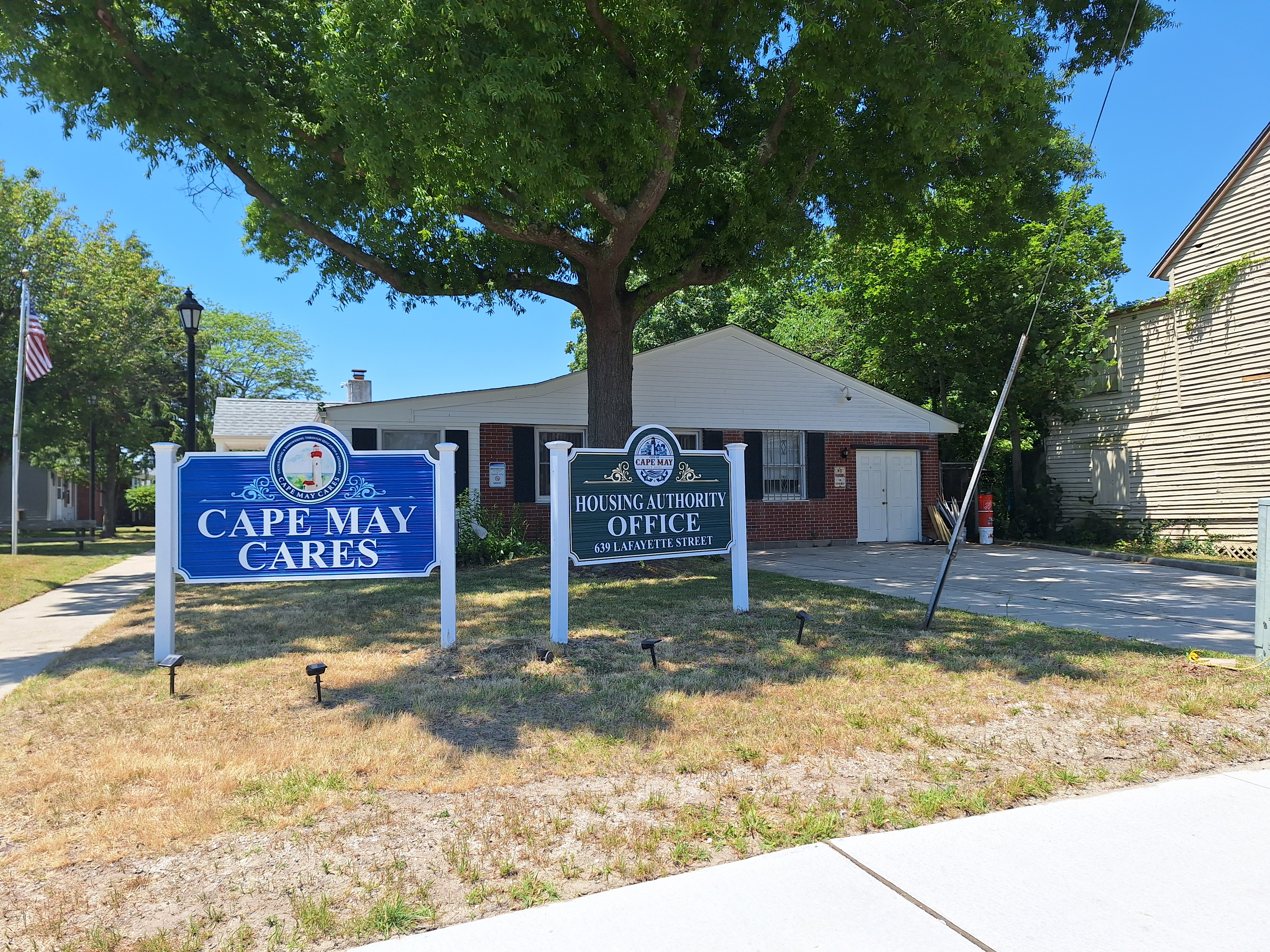
Cape May Housing Authority

=== Local government ===
Effective July 1, 2004, Cape May switched to a Council-Manager form of government under the Faulkner Act, after having used Plan A of the Faulkner Act Small Municipality form since 1995. The city is one of 42 municipalities (of the 564) statewide that use this form of government. The governing body is comprised of the Mayor and the four-member City Council, with all positions elected at-large to four-year terms of office on a non-partisan basis as part of the November general election in even-numbered years. The Mayor is elected directly by the voters. The Borough Council is elected to serve four-year terms on a staggered basis, with three seats coming up for election together and then the mayor and the fourth council seat up for vote together two years later. Following the 2004 elections, the first under the new form of government, lots were drawn to determine which of the newly elected members would serve a four-year term, with the other three serving two-year terms. A city manager is responsible for the city's executive functions, managing Cape May's activities and operation. Voters approved a November 2010 referendum to shift the city's elections from May to November, with city officials estimating that the change would save $30,000 in costs that had been associated with each May election.

As of 2026, the Mayor of Cape May City is Zachary Mullock, whose term of office ends December 31, 2028. Other members of the Cape May City Council are Deputy Mayor Maureen K. McDade (2026), Lorraine M. Baldwin (2026), Steve Bodnar (2028) and Shaine P. Meier (2026).

In March 2015, Councilman Jerry Inderwies Jr. resigned to protest what he called a "witch hunt" against the police chief. In the November 2015 general election, Roger Furlin was elected to fill the balance of the council seat vacated by Inderwies.

In January 2021, the city council selected Lorraine Baldwin to fill the council seat expiring in 2022 that had been held by Zachary Mullock until he resigned to take office as mayor. Baldwin served on an interim basis until the November 2021 general election, when voters chose her to serve the balance of the term of office. Also in January 2021, Michael Voll was appointed to City Manager.

In November 2021, the city council appointed Michael Yeager to fill the seat expiring in December 2021 that had been held by Christopher Bezaire until he resigned after pleading guilty earlier that month to charges that he had engaged in stalking an ex-girlfriend and that he had been in contempt of court.

=== Federal, state, and county representation ===
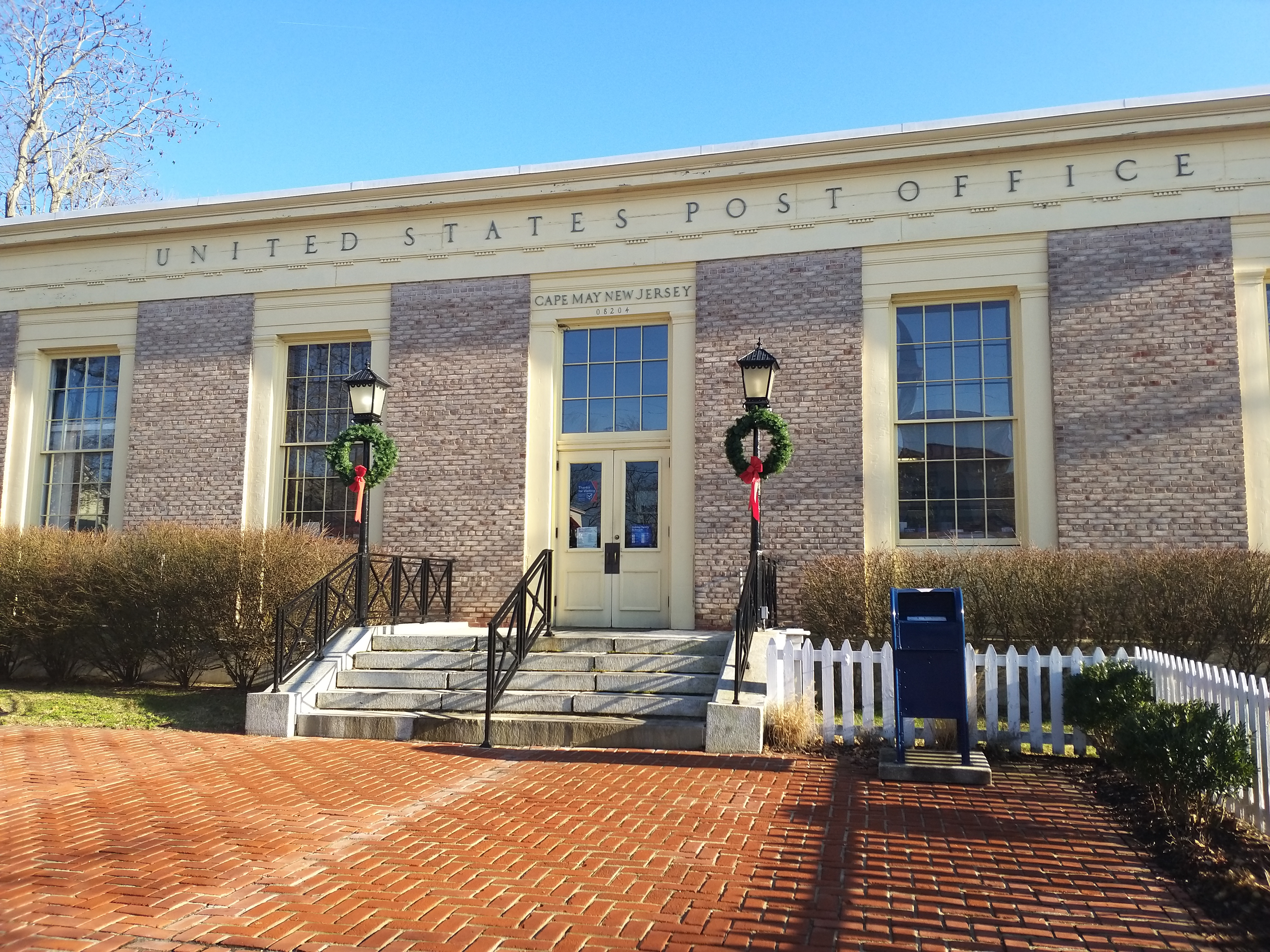
Cape May Post Office

Cape May City is located in the 2nd Congressional District and is part of New Jersey's 1st state legislative district.

For the 119th United States Congress, New Jersey's 2nd congressional district is represented by Jeff Van Drew (R, Dennis Township). New Jersey is represented in the United States Senate by Democrats Cory Booker (Newark, term ends 2027) and Andy Kim (Moorestown, term ends 2031).

For the 2026–2027 session, the 1st legislative district of the New Jersey Legislature is represented in the State Senate by Mike Testa (R, Vineland) and in the General Assembly by Antwan McClellan (R, Ocean City) and Erik K. Simonsen (R, Lower Township).

Cape May County is governed by a five-person Board of County Commissioners whose members are elected at-large on a partisan basis to three-year terms of office on a staggered basis, with either one or two seats coming up for election each year; At an annual reorganization held each January, the commissioners select one member to serve as director and another to serve as vice-director. As of 2026, Cape May County's Commissioners are Director Leonard C. Desiderio (R, Sea Isle City, term as commissioner ends December 31, 2027; term as director ends 2026), Vice-Director Andrew Bulakowski (R, Lower Township; term as commissioner ends 2028; term as vice-director ends 2026). Robert Barr (R, Ocean City; 2028) and Will Morey (R, Wildwood Crest; 2026), with one seat expiring in December 2026 vacant after Melanie Collette resigned from office in March 2026. The county's constitutional officers are Clerk Rita Marie Rothberg (R, Ocean City; 2030), Sheriff Robert Nolan (R, Lower Township; 2026) and Surrogate E. Marie Hayes (R, Ocean City; 2028).

=== Politics ===
As of March 2011, there were a total of 1,932 registered voters in Cape May City, of which 452 (23.4%) were registered as Democrats, 838 (43.4%) were registered as Republicans and 640 (33.1%) were registered as Unaffiliated. There were 2 voters registered as either Libertarians or Greens.

Gubernatorial election results for Cape May
Year	Republican		Democratic		Third party(ies)	
Year	No.	%	No.	%	No.	%
2025	564	46.08%	654	53.43%	6	0.49%
2021	541	49.45%	547	50.00%	6	0.55%
2017	475	52.54%	409	45.24%	20	2.21%
2013	737	72.90%	261	25.82%	13	1.29%
2009	608	52.60%	457	39.53%	91	7.87%
2005	573	51.86%	500	45.25%	32	2.90%

In the 2012 presidential election, Republican Mitt Romney received 52.2% of the vote (745 cast), ahead of Democrat Barack Obama with 46.9% (669 votes), and other candidates with 0.9% (13 votes), among the 1,442 ballots cast by the city's 1,925 registered voters (15 ballots were spoiled), for a turnout of 74.9%. In the 2008 presidential election, Republican John McCain received 50.9% of the vote (817 cast), ahead of Democrat Barack Obama, who received 46.4% (745 votes), with 1,605 ballots cast among the city's 1,940 registered voters, for a turnout of 82.7%. In the 2004 presidential election, Republican George W. Bush received 53.8% of the vote (942 ballots cast), outpolling Democrat John Kerry, who received around 44.0% (771 votes), with 1,752 ballots cast among the city's 2,276 registered voters, for a turnout percentage of 77.0.

United States presidential election results for Cape May 2024 2020 2016 2012 2008 2004
Year	Republican		Democratic		Third party(ies)	
Year	No.	%	No.	%	No.	%
2024	666	45.99%	752	51.93%	30	2.07%
2020	732	46.54%	826	52.51%	15	0.95%
2016	728	51.09%	648	45.47%	49	3.44%
2012	745	52.21%	669	46.88%	13	0.91%
2008	817	51.51%	745	46.97%	24	1.51%
2004	942	54.33%	771	44.46%	21	1.21%

In the 2013 gubernatorial election, Republican Chris Christie received 72.9% of the vote (737 cast), ahead of Democrat Barbara Buono with 25.8% (261 votes), and other candidates with 1.3% (13 votes), among the 1,036 ballots cast by the city's 1,902 registered voters (25 ballots were spoiled), for a turnout of 54.5%. In the 2009 gubernatorial election, Republican Chris Christie received 52.1% of the vote (608 ballots cast), ahead of both Democrat Jon Corzine with 39.1% (457 votes) and Independent Chris Daggett with 6.8% (80 votes), with 1,168 ballots cast among the city's 2,069 registered voters, yielding a 56.5% turnout.

United States Senate election results for Cape May1
Year	Republican		Democratic		Third party(ies)	
Year	No.	%	No.	%	No.	%
2024	709	51.12%	659	47.51%	19	1.37%
2018	648	53.38%	532	43.82%	34	2.80%
2012	637	50.48%	598	47.39%	27	2.14%
2006	670	52.96%	568	44.90%	27	2.13%

United States Senate election results for Cape May2
Year	Republican		Democratic		Third party(ies)	
Year	No.	%	No.	%	No.	%
2020	704	46.81%	780	51.86%	20	1.33%
2014	508	49.71%	501	49.02%	13	1.27%
2013	337	54.01%	281	45.03%	6	0.96%
2008	756	53.66%	620	44.00%	33	2.34%

=== Infrastructure ===
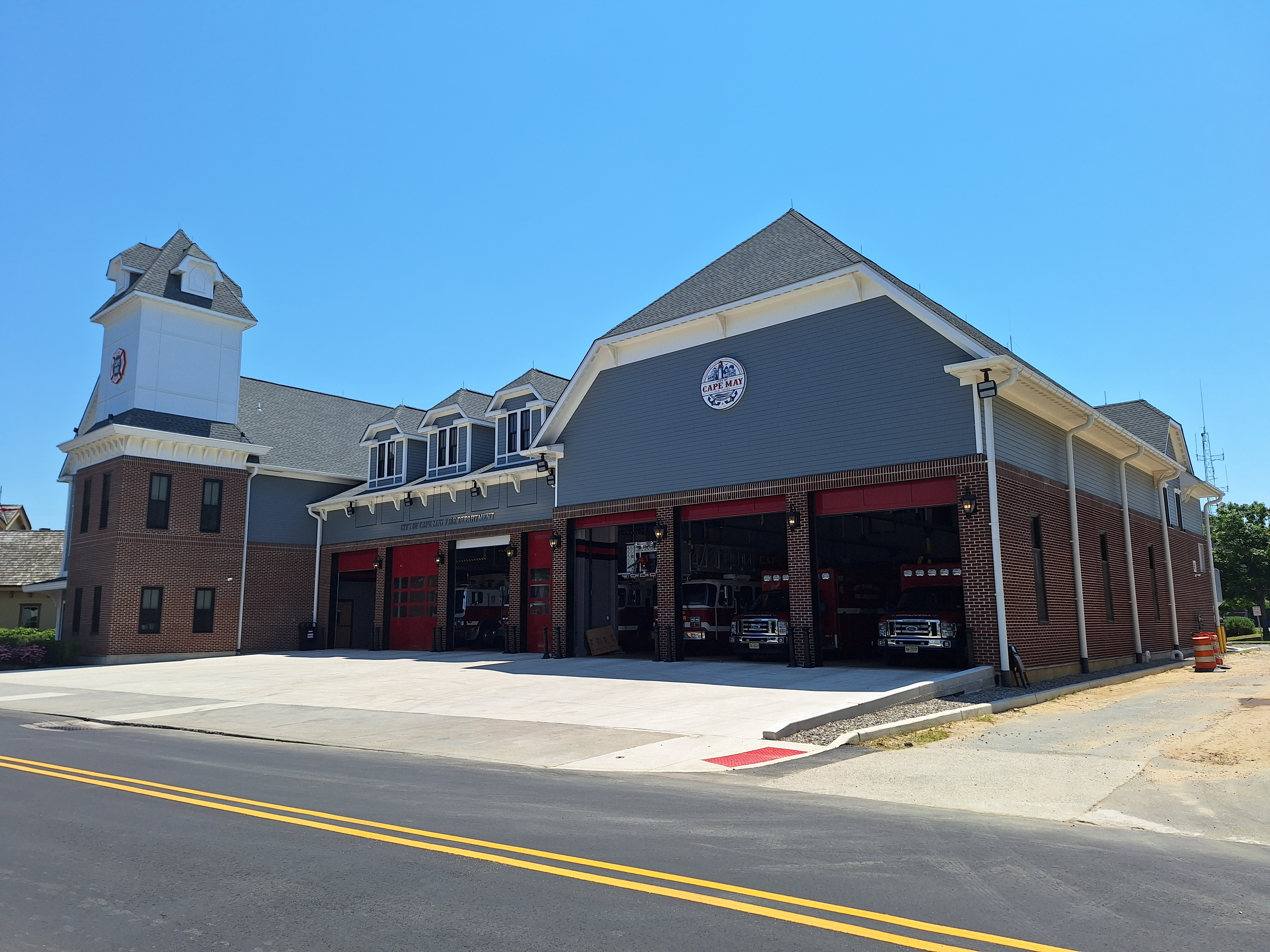
Current Cape May fire station

Cape May established a desalinization plant in the late 1990s to manage salt going into its water aquifers.

Cape May's current sewage plant in 1960 or 1961, less than a year after the New Jersey Attorney General's deadline for Cape May Point to have a sewage plant, as it had previously dumped sewage in the Delaware Bay; the New Jersey Department of Health had warned the borough about this in 1951. Despite the borough missing the deadline, the state never fined the borough as the Attorney General removed his judgment.

== Education ==
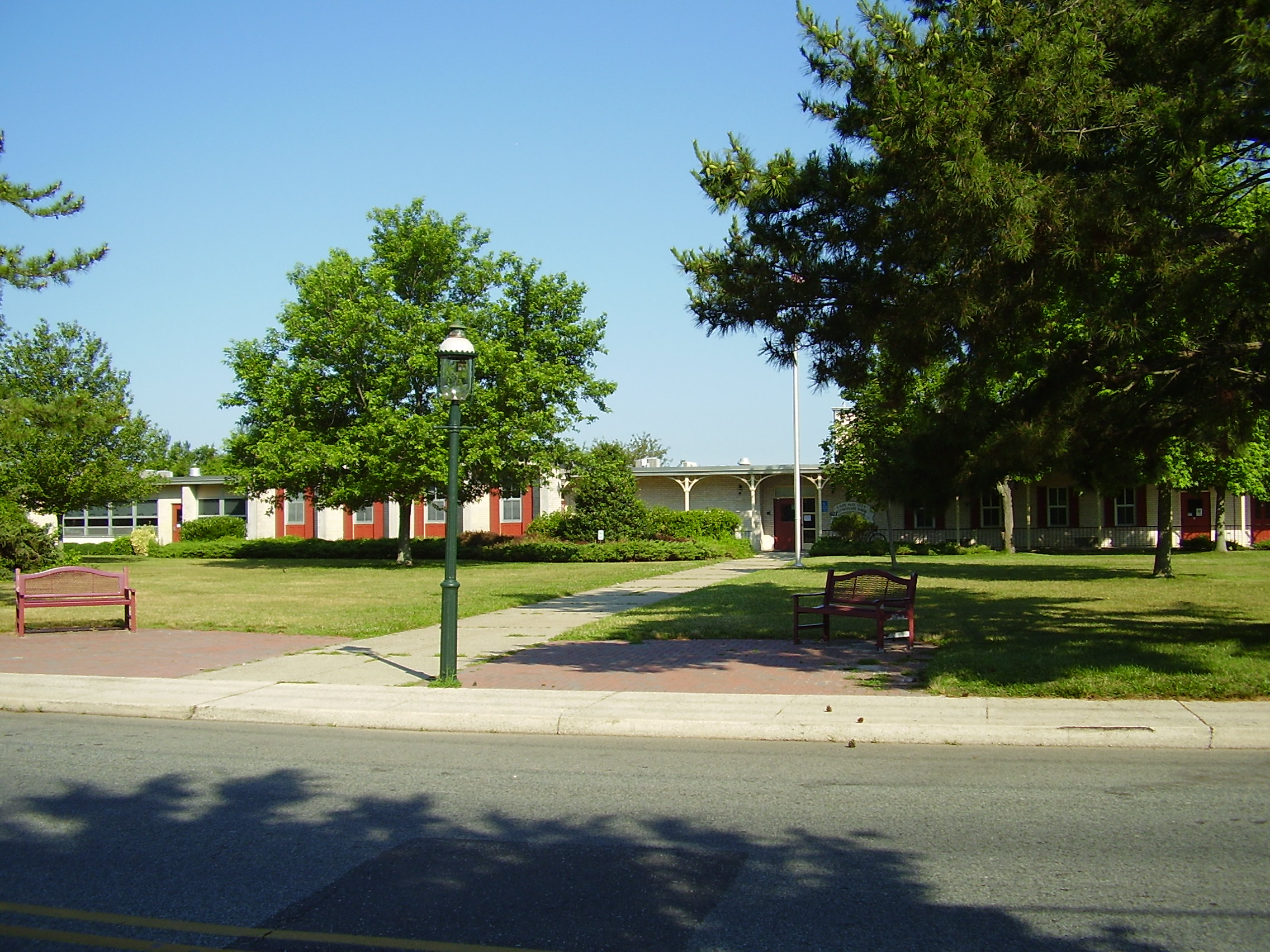
Cape May City Elementary School

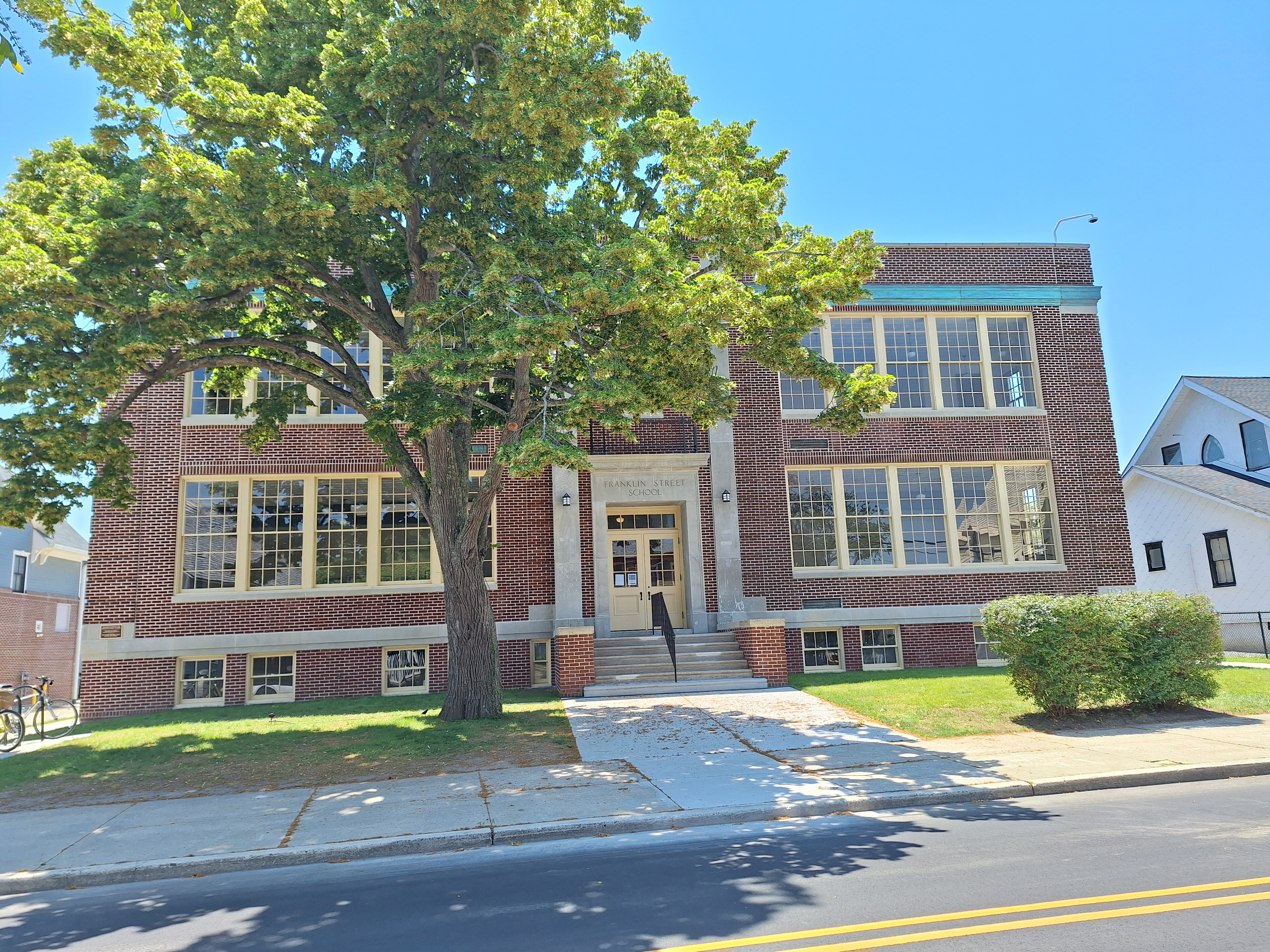
Franklin Street School, a former elementary school for black children and the current site of the Cape May Library

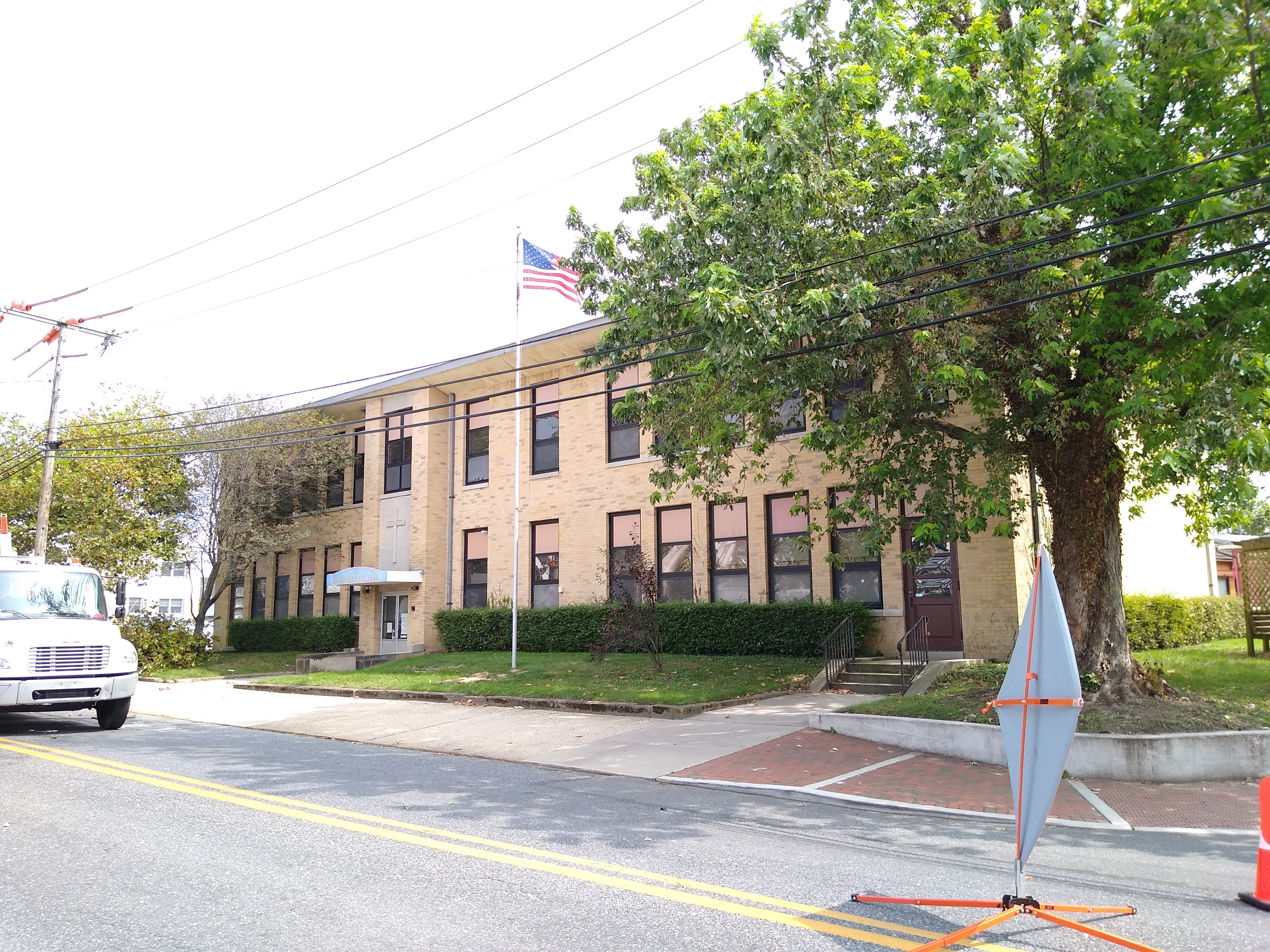
The former Our Lady Star of the Sea Catholic School, which merged into what later became Wildwood Catholic Academy in 2010

For pre-kindergarten through sixth grade, public school students attend Cape May City Elementary School as part of the Cape May City School District. As of the 2024–25 school year, the district, comprised of one school, had an enrollment of 151 students and 25.0 classroom teachers (on an FTE basis), for a student–teacher ratio of 6.1:1. Also attending are students from Cape May Point, a non-operating district, as part of a sending/receiving relationship, with most students in the district coming from the United States Coast Guard Training Center Cape May.

For seventh through twelfth grades, public school students attend the schools of the Lower Cape May Regional School District, which serves students from Cape May, Lower Township and West Cape May, along with students from Cape May Point who attend as part of a sending/receiving relationship. Schools in the district (with 2024–25 enrollment data from the National Center for Education Statistics) are Richard M. Teitelman Middle School with 394 students in grades 7–8 and Lower Cape May Regional High School with 717 students in grades 9–12. The high school district's board of education is comprised of nine members, who are elected directly by voters to serve three-year terms of office on a staggered basis, with three seats up for election each year. Seats on the board are allocated based on population, with Cape May assigned one seat.

Students are also eligible to attend Cape May County Technical High School in Cape May Court House, which serves students from the entire county in its comprehensive and vocational programs, which are offered without charge to students who are county residents. Special needs students may be referred to Cape May County Special Services School District in the Cape May Court House area.

The nearest private Catholic school serving Cape May is Wildwood Catholic Academy (Pre-K12) in North Wildwood, under the auspices of the Roman Catholic Diocese of Camden.

Colleges and universities in the Cape May area include Atlantic Cape Community College, Rutgers University–Camden, and the Institute of Marine and Coastal Sciences.

The Cape May Branch of the Cape May County Public Library is located in Cape May City. The library was previously in city hall but later moved to a standalone building. In 2009 an estimated $507,800 renovation was to take place with $395,300, or about 78% of the expenses, paid by Cape May County. In 2024 it moved from a previous location to the renovated Franklin Street School. A task force convened by Cape May City Council stated that the former library on Ocean Street should be used as a community center.

=== History of education ===
According to an 1868 article in The Inkwell by William Lycett, historically Cape May had a school known as the "Indian Queen.", until another school opened in 1868. He also stated that his father operated a private educational institution.

The first Cape May High School, built in 1901, was designed by Seymour Davis and built for $35,000. In 1917 a new Cape May High School facility was built, with the 1901 building becoming an elementary school. In the past Cape May elementary schools were segregated on the basis of race; churches and households initially educated black children. From 1928 to 1948, black elementary school students attended Franklin Street School. Cape May High School educated students of all races. Cape May High closed effective December 22, 1960, and LCMRHS opened in 1961.c. 1970 the first Cape May High School building was demolished, and was replaced with an Acme Markets location that occupied the site starting in the 1970s. The second Cape May High School building has since become the city hall and police station.

Cape May previously had its own Catholic K–8 school, Our Lady Star of the Sea School, which served as the parish school for Our Lady Star of the Sea, St. John of God (North Cape May) and St. Raymond (Villas) churches. The St. Raymond School closed in 2007 with students sent to Our Lady Star of the Sea. In 2010 Our Lady Star of the Sea merged into Cape Trinity Regional School (Pre-K–8) in North Wildwood. That school in turn merged into Wildwood Catholic Academy in 2020.

Starting in 2010, discussions were under way regarding a possible consolidation of the districts of Cape May City, Cape May Point and the West Cape May School District.

The Franklin Street School opened as the current library due to a renovation worth $11,000,000. About one and one half years was the duration of the project completion. The opening ceremony involved a chain of people moving books between the old and new libraries with their hands.

== Transportation ==
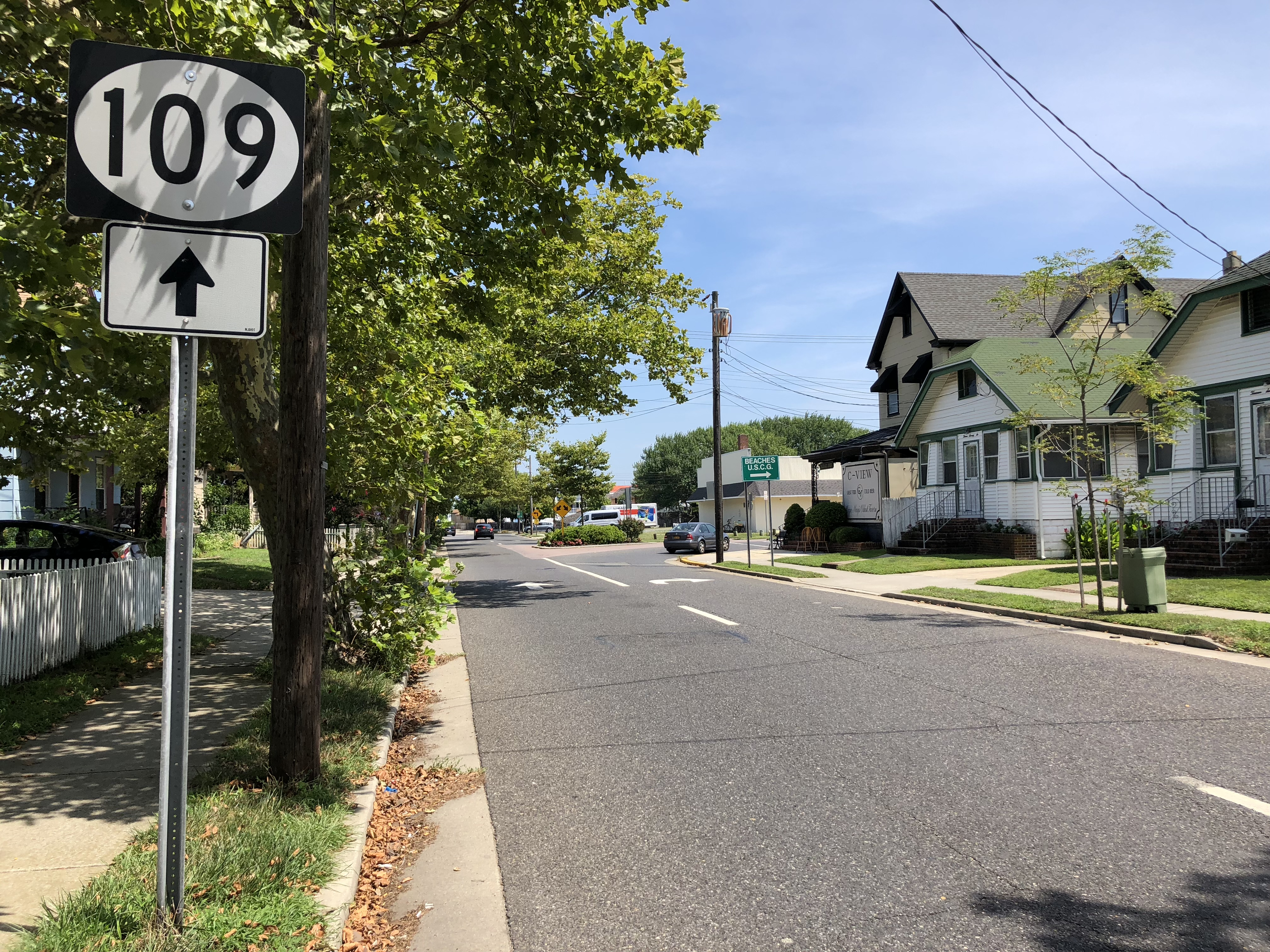
Route 109 northbound in Cape May

=== Roads and highways ===
As of May 2010, the city had a total of 31.63 mi (50.90 km) of roadways, of which 24.99 mi (40.22 km) were maintained by the municipality and 6.64 mi (10.69 km) by Cape May County.

Route 109 leads into Cape May from the north and provides access to the southern terminus of the Garden State Parkway along with U.S. Route 9 in neighboring Lower Township. U.S. Route 9 leads to the Cape May–Lewes Ferry, which heads across the Delaware Bay to Lewes, Delaware.

=== Public transportation ===
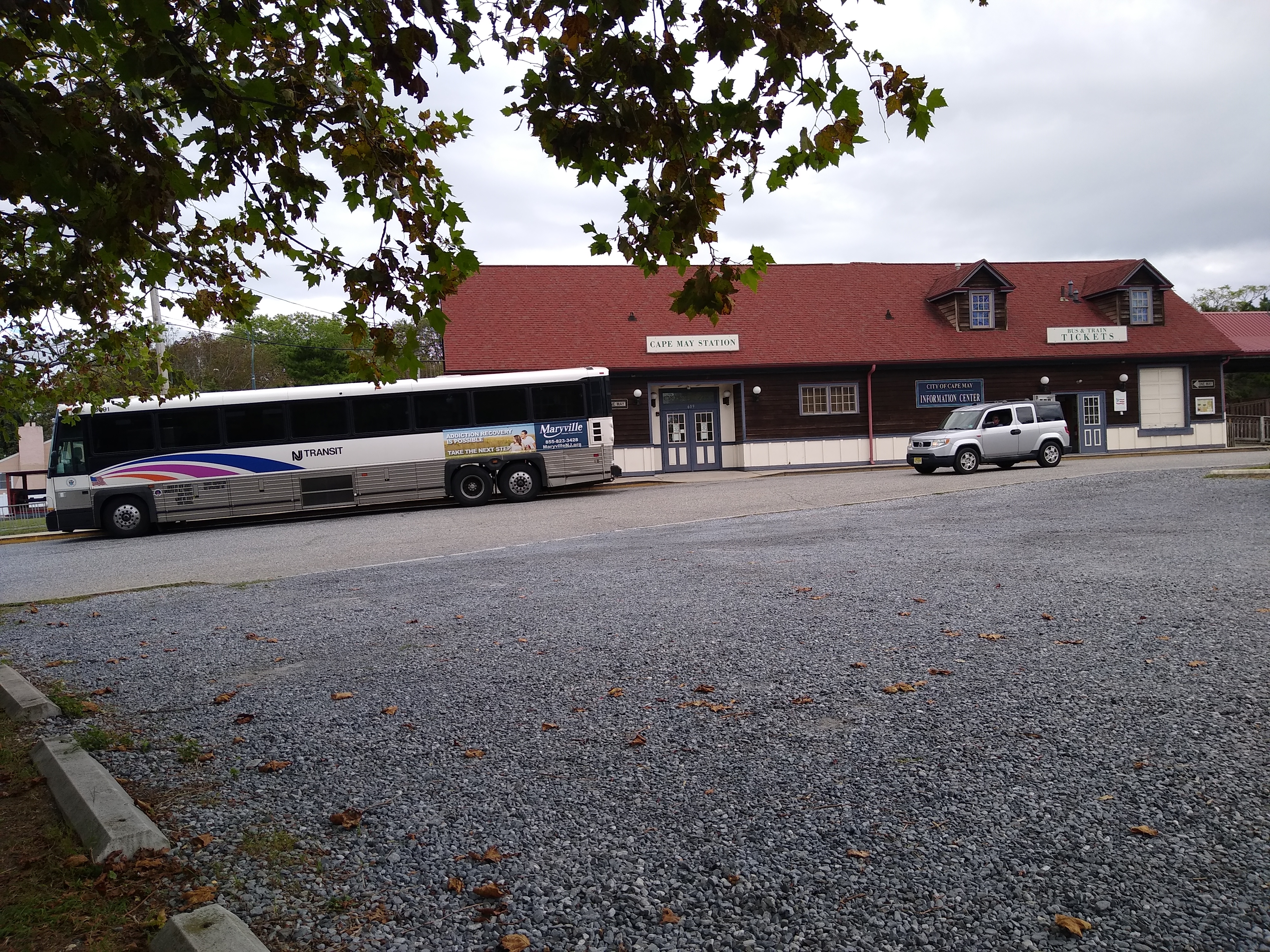
Cape May Station and Welcome Center (bus station and former train station)

NJ Transit provides service to Philadelphia on the 313 and 315 routes and to Atlantic City on the 552 route, with seasonal service to Philadelphia on the 316 route and to the Port Authority Bus Terminal in Midtown Manhattan on the 319 route.

The Great American Trolley Company operates trolley service in Cape May daily during the summer months, running along a loop route through the city.

The city is served by rail from the Cape May City Rail Terminal, offering excursion train service on the Cape May Seashore Lines from the terminal located at the intersection of Lafayette Street and Elmira Street.

The city last had regional passenger train service by the Pennsylvania-Reading Seashore Lines in the mid-1960s. Final service into Camden, New Jersey (across the Delaware River from Philadelphia) ended in January 1966, while service to Lindenwold station ended in October 1981.

=== Ferry transport ===
The Delaware River and Bay Authority operates the Cape May-Lewes Ferry year-round, a 70-85 minute across Delaware Bay to Lewes, Delaware, carrying passengers and cars. The ferry constitutes a portion of U.S. Route 9.

The Delaware River and Bay Authority operates a shuttle bus in the summer months which connects the Cape May Welcome Center with the Cape May–Lewes Ferry terminal.

== Media ==
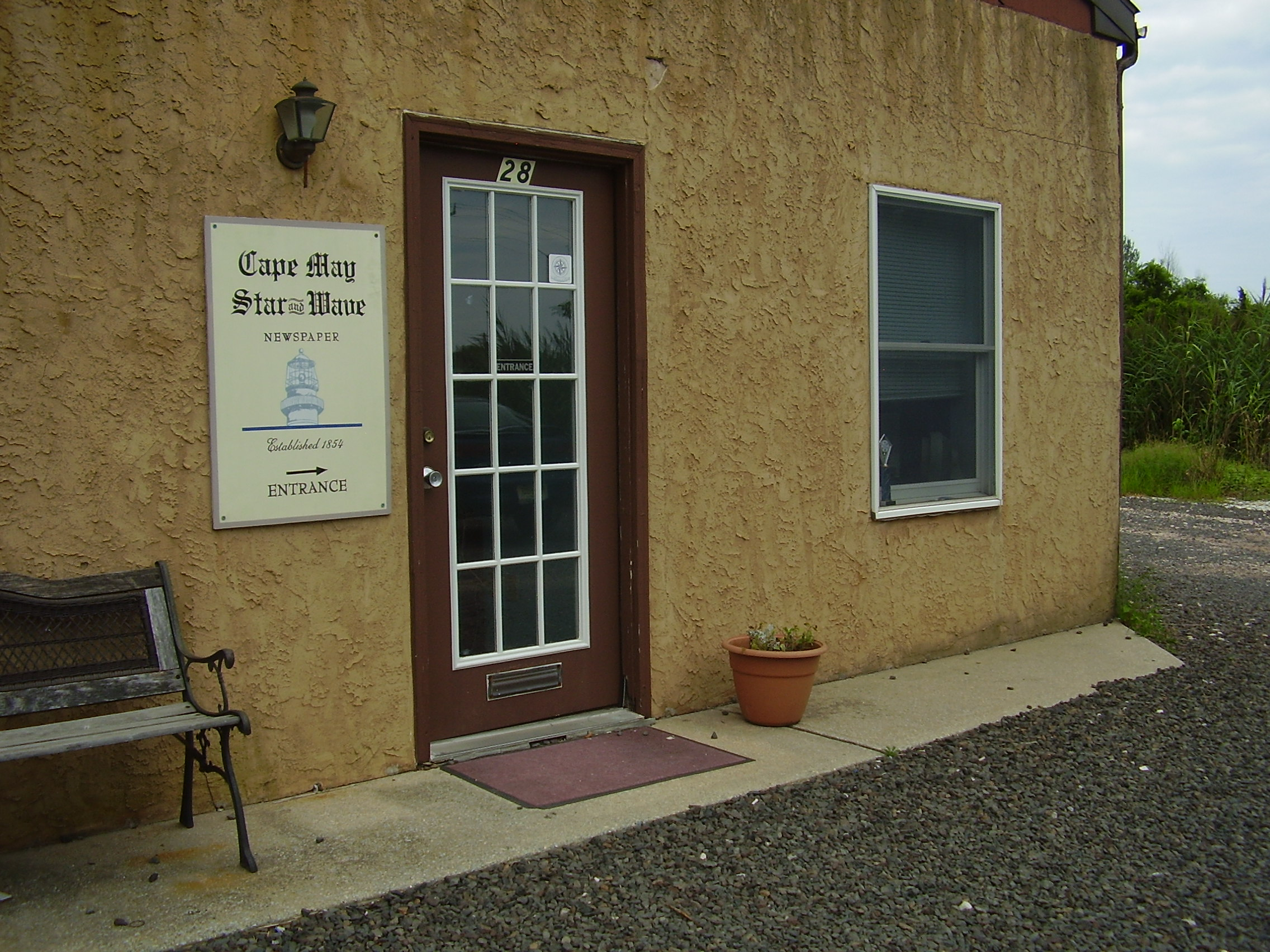
Cape May Star and Wave offices

Cape May is served by several media outlets including WCFA-LP 101.5 FM, a commercial-free jazz and community station, the weekly Cape May Star and Wave, two free weekly newspapers, The Cape May Gazette and Exit Zero, and local websites CapeMay.com and Cape May Times.

The countywide newspaper is Cape May County Herald.

The regional newspapers for the area including Cape May County are the Press of Atlantic City, and the Philadelphia Inquirer.

The name Exit Zero refers to the town's location at the far southern end of the Garden State Parkway near the intersection with Route 109. Informally, the entire town is sometimes called Exit Zero.

== Coast Guard Training Center Cape May ==
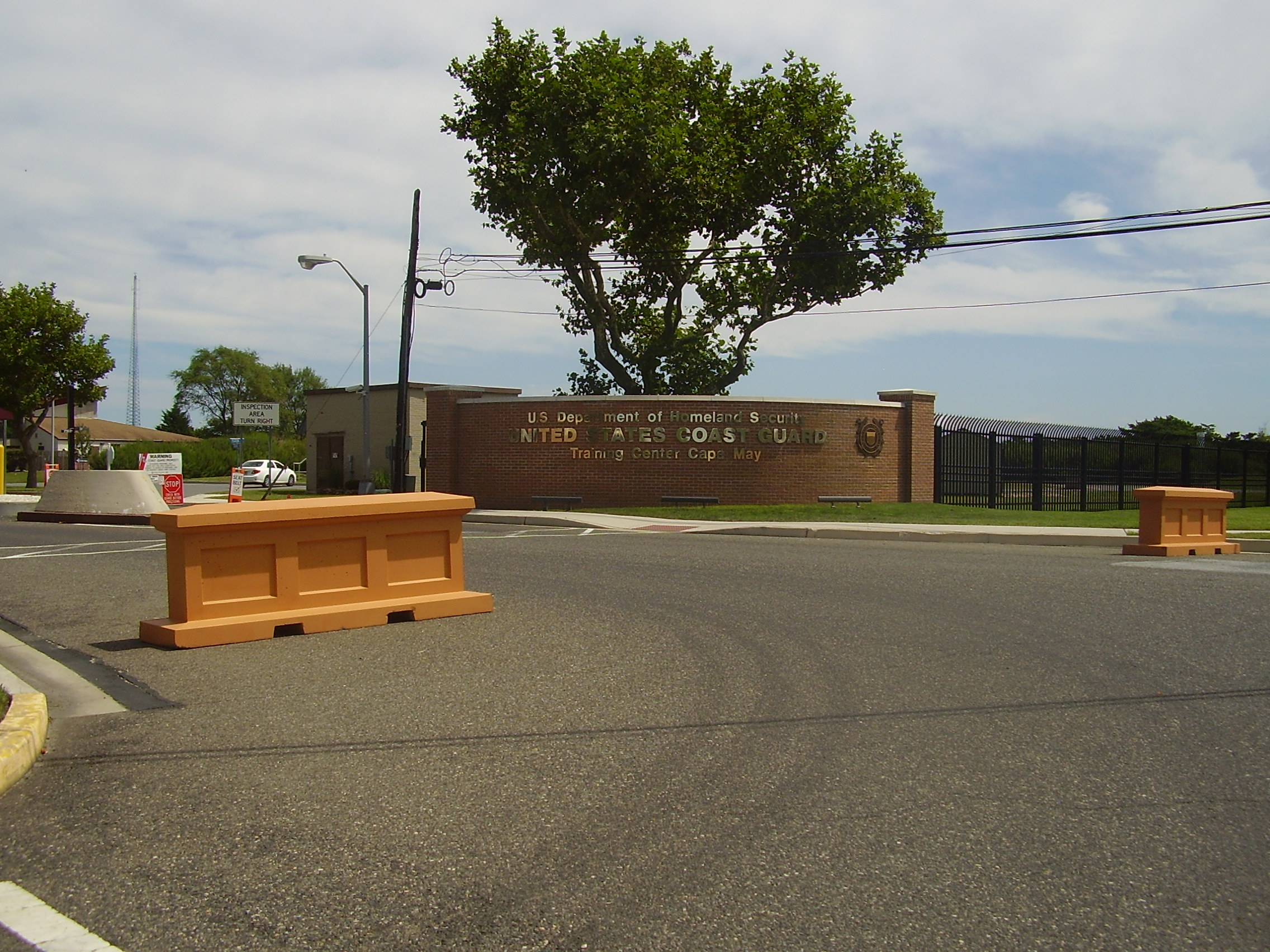
The U.S. Coast Guard Training Center in Cape May

The United States Coast Guard Training Center Cape May, New Jersey, is the nation's only Coast Guard Recruit Training Center. In 1924, the U.S. Coast Guard occupied the base and established air facilities for planes used in support of United States Customs Service efforts. During the Prohibition era, several cutters were assigned to Cape May to foil rumrunners operating off the New Jersey coast. After Prohibition, the Coast Guard all but abandoned Cape May leaving a small air/sea rescue contingent. For a short period of time (1929–1934), part of the base was used as a civilian airport. With the advent of World War II, a larger airstrip was constructed and the United States Navy returned to train aircraft carrier pilots. The over the water approach simulated carrier landings at sea. The Coast Guard also increased its Cape May forces for coastal patrol, anti-submarine warfare, air/sea rescue and buoy service. In 1946, the Navy relinquished the base to the Coast Guard. The Cape May Airport still houses the Naval Air Station Wildwood Aviation Museum.

In 1948, all entry-level training on the U.S. East Coast was moved to the U.S. Coast Guard Recruit Receiving Station in Cape May. The U.S. Coast Guard consolidated all recruit training functions in Cape May in 1982. Over 350 military and civilian personnel and their dependents are attached to the Cape May Training Center.

== In popular culture ==
- Cape May is the subject of the song "On the Way to Cape May", originally sung by Cozy Morley.
- The 1980s horror film The Prowler was filmed entirely on location in Cape May.
- The town lends its name to the Cape May Cafe, a restaurant in the Beach Club Resort at Walt Disney World.
- In The Blacklist, Cape May is the setting in the episode "Cape May".
- Scenes for the film A Complete Unknown, a biopic about Bob Dylan featuring Timothée Chalamet, were filmed in Cape May in the spring of 2024. Cape May served as a suitable location to mimic Newport, Rhode Island and the 1965 Newport Folk Festival, where Dylan first performed in public with an electric guitar. Minimal redress was needed, given the resort's commitment to its designation as a National Historic Landmark, with its concentration of Victorian architecture as well as other 19th and 20th century architectural motifs.
- On 8/28/2025 the single "Ode to Cape May," A song by Nikki Fournier was released by Partridge Records and Music, LLC

== Notable people ==
People who were born in, residents of, or otherwise closely associated with Cape May include:

- Douglas Adams (1876–1931), cricketer, who played for the Gentlemen of Philadelphia in First class cricket
- Cliff Anderson (1929–1979), football player who played two seasons in the NFL with the Chicago Cardinals and New York Giants
- Nan Brooks (1935–2018), children's book illustrator
- Thomas Cannuli, professional poker player, known for finishing 6th place in the 2015 WSOP Main Event and winning a WSOP bracelet in the $3,333 WSOP.com Online No-Limit Hold'em High Roller
- Frederick B. Dent (1922–2019), politician who served as the United States Secretary of Commerce from 1973 to 1975
- Eugene Grace (1876–1960), president of Bethlehem Steel Corporation from 1916 to 1945
- Bubba Green (born 1957), football player who played defensive lineman for one season for the Baltimore Colts
- T. Millet Hand (1902–1956), politician who represented New Jersey's 2nd congressional district in the United States House of Representatives and served as mayor of Cape May
- Thomas H. Hughes (1769–1839), the founder and owner of the Congress Hall Hotel, and a Democratic-Republican member of the United States House of Representatives from New Jersey
- Chris Jay (born 1978), musician, actor and screenwriter. Founding member of the band, Army of Freshmen
- Alan Kotok (1941–2006), computer scientist known for his work at Digital Equipment Corporation and at the World Wide Web Consortium
- John Henry Kurtz (1945–2008), singer-songwriter and actor best known for performing the song "Drift Away"
- John D. Lankenau (1817–1901), German-American businessman and philanthropist
- Jarena Lee (1783–1864), the first woman authorized to preach by Richard Allen, founder of the African Methodist Episcopal Church, in 1819
- Anthony Maher (born 1979), professional soccer forward
- Myles Martel (born 1943), communication adviser
- Sylvius Moore (1912–2004), football player and coach who was head coach of the Hampton Pirates football team
- Richie Phillips (1940–2013), sports union leader
- Bill Pilczuk (born 1971), competitive swimmer
- Louis Purnell (1920–2001), curator at the National Air and Space Museum and earlier in life, a decorated Tuskegee Airman
- Emil Salvini (born 1949), author, historian and host / creator of PBS's Tales of the Jersey Shore
- Charles W. Sandman Jr. (1921–1985), politician who represented New Jersey's 2nd congressional district and was the party's candidate for Governor of New Jersey in 1973
- I. Grant Scott (1897–1964), politician who served in the New Jersey General Assembly, the New Jersey Senate and as Mayor of Cape May
- Barbara Lee Smith (born 1938), mixed media artist, writer, educator and curator
- Witmer Stone (1866–1939), ornithologist who did much of his research in Cape May
- Julius H. Taylor (1914–2011), professor emeritus at Morgan State University who was chairperson of the department of physics.
- Harriet Tubman (1822–1913), abolitionist and social activist who, after escaping slavery, made some 13 missions to rescue approximately 70 enslaved people; she is honored with a museum in the city
- Paul Volcker (1927–2019), former chairman of the United States Federal Reserve who was born here while his father was the Cape May city manager
- John B. Walthour (1904–1952), 4th bishop of the Episcopal Diocese of Atlanta

== See also ==
- Cape May Light

Preceded by Diamond Beach	Beaches of New Jersey	Succeeded by Southernmost
