= Sylvius Moore =

American football player and coach (1912–2004)

Biographical details
- Born: February 24, 1912; Cape May, New Jersey, U.S.
- Died: September 10, 2004 (aged 92); Chicago, Illinois, U.S.

Playing career
- 1931: Hampton

Coaching career (HC unless noted)
- 1941–1942: Phenix HS (VA)
- 1943–1944: Hampton

Head coaching record
- Overall: 5–7–1 (college)

Sylvius S. Moore Sr. (February 24, 1912 – September 10, 2004) was an American football player and coach. He served as the head football coach at his alma mater, Hampton University in Hampton, Virginia, from 1943 to 1944, compiling a record of 5–7–1.

== Head coaching record ==
=== College ===
Year	Team	Overall	Conference	Standing	Bowl/playoffs
Hampton Pirates (Colored Intercollegiate Athletic Association) (1943–1944)
1943	Hampton	4–2	2–2	T–3rd	
1944	Hampton	1–5–1	1–4–1	5th	
Hampton:		5–7–1	3–6–1		
Total:		5–7–1			
