= Myles Martel =

American communication adviser

Myles Martel is an American communication adviser specializing in leadership. He has served mainly corporate and political clients since 1969, after founding the firm Martel and Associates, where he remains president and CEO.

== Early life ==
Martel spent his childhood years in Gardiner, Maine, but now resides in Gulf Stream, FL and Cape May, NJ.

== Education ==
He holds a B.A. from The University of Connecticut (1965) as well as a master's degree and Ph.D. from Temple University (1974).

== Career ==
Early in his career, Martel served on the faculty of West Chester University, rising to full professor. As debate coach there, his team won the Pennsylvania state college championship in 1970.

In 1980, Martel came to national prominence as Ronald Reagan's personal debate adviser, at which time he coached the former president for his televised debates against John Anderson and incumbent Jimmy Carter.

He has advised Fortune 500 CEOs, celebrities and political leaders including more than 40 senators, congressmen, ambassadors, governors and presidential cabinet members.

== Published works ==
Martel has published six books: Leadership Legacies: Words to Enlighten, Persuade and Inspire, Before You Say A Word, Political Campaign Debates, Mastering the Art of Q & A, The Persuasive Edge, and Fire Away! Fielding Tough Questions with Finesse. He has written numerous articles that have been featured in a host of business and academic journals.

Martel's expertise has resulted in wide media exposure on programs including ABC World News, Nightline, and CBS This Morning. His views have been quoted in The Wall Street Journal, Directors & Boards, Harper's, U.S. News & World Report, USA Today and The New York Times.

== Honors ==
Martel has received numerous honors, including the George Washington Honor Medal from the Freedoms Foundation. The University of Connecticut presented him with their Distinguished Alumni Award for Outstanding Professional Achievement, and he was inducted into Temple University's School of Communication and Theater Hall of Fame. Martel delivered the Andrew W. Mellon Fund Lecture at Oxford University.

Martel was awarded the 2013 University of Connecticut (UConn) Alumni Association University Service Award "in recognition of volunteer efforts that have enriched the depth and stature of UConn."

== Community involvement ==
Martel served on the board of directors of the University of Connecticut Alumni Association and chaired the advisory board of its College of Liberal Arts and Sciences. He has taught a graduate course on leadership at Temple University.

Lecture series at both the University of Connecticut and Temple University were created in his name.

In 2007, Martel initiated and led a University of Connecticut Alumni Association project to build a memorial honoring the university's students who have died while serving the United States during wartime. "The Ultimate Sacrifice Memorial" was completed in 2008 and stands on the college's main campus in Storrs, CT.

In 2013 to celebrate the 150th anniversary of Abraham Lincoln's Gettysburg Address, Martel chaired the "In Lincoln's Footsteps" speech contest.
