= Washington Street Mall =

Street in Cape May, New Jersey, USA

Coordinates: 38.933°N 74.923°W

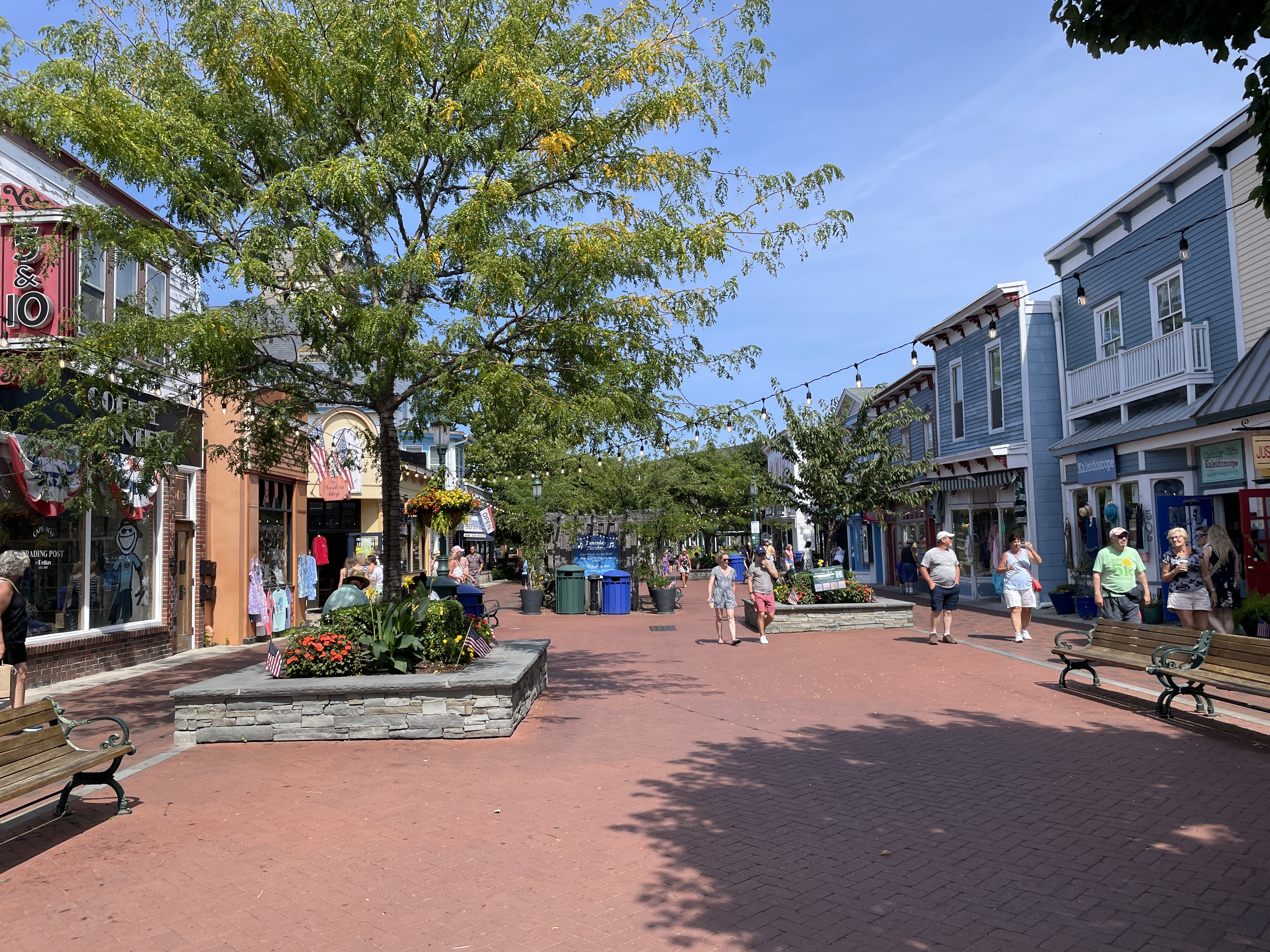
The Washington Street Mall

The Washington Street Mall is a pedestrian mall in downtown Cape May, New Jersey. It makes up the southernmost three blocks of Washington Street, a major east-west street in the city, which runs from Lafayette Street (New Jersey Route 109) to Perry Street; the mall portion runs from Ocean Street to Perry Street. Washington Street Mall is filled with restaurants and stores, and, beside Cape May's beaches and Victorian houses, is one of the city's most noticeable features.

== History ==
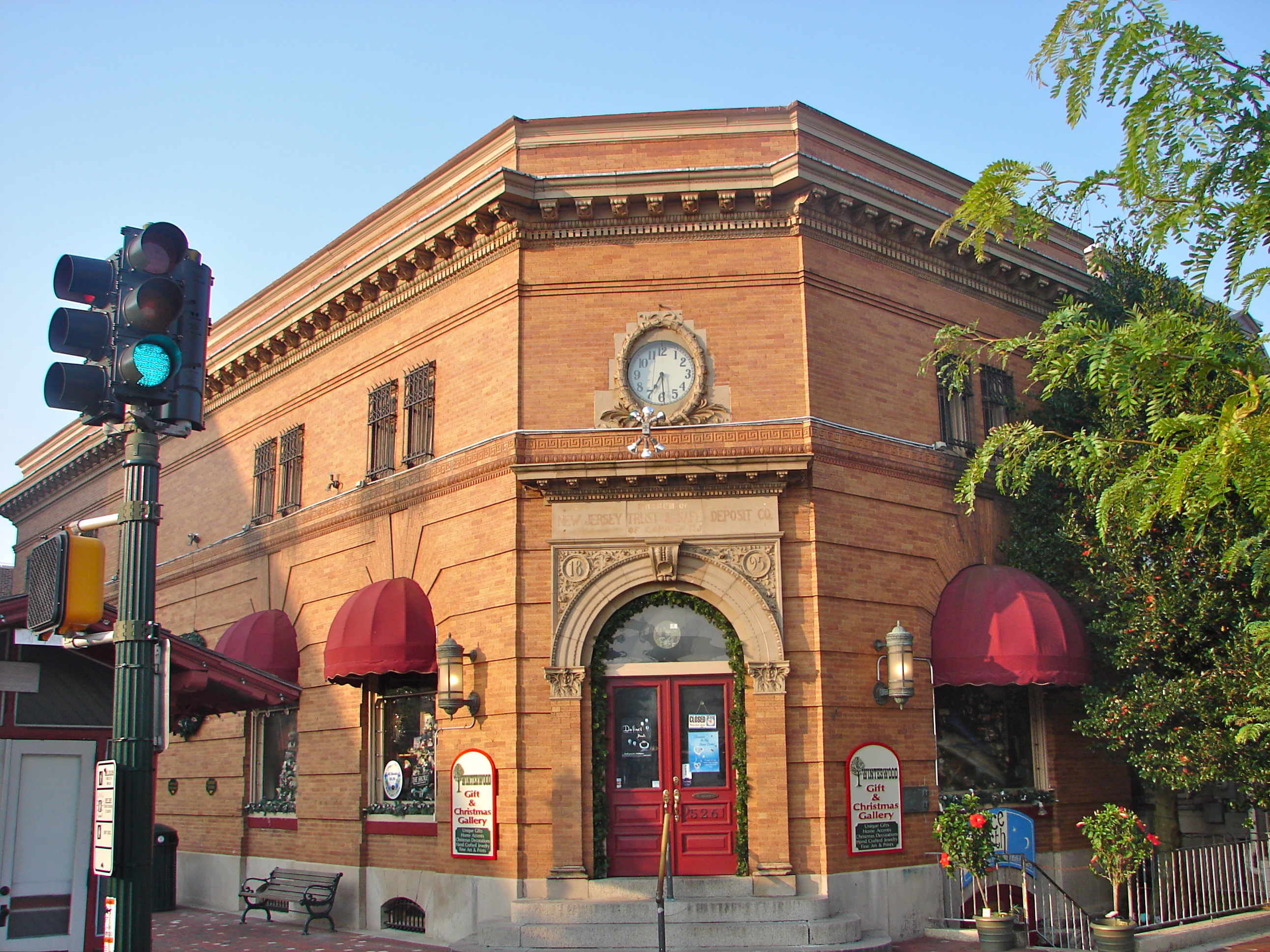
New Jersey Trust and Safety Deposit Building, on the Mall

The City of Cape May closed Washington Street to traffic from Ocean Street to Perry Street in 1970 to allow commercial development. Trees, flowers, and shrubs were planted, and the street was filled in. The Washington Street Mall was officially opened on June 24, 1971.

In December 1976, during the Christmas shopping season, the block between Jackson Street and Perry Street was consumed by a fire, but was rebuilt.
