= Douglas Adams (cricketer) =

American cricketer (1876–1931)

Douglas Howe Adams
Personal information
- Full name: Douglas Howe Adams
- Born: August 2, 1876; Cape May, New Jersey
- Died: January 27, 1931 (aged 54); Somers Point, New Jersey
- Bowling: Right arm medium pace

Career statistics
Competition	First class
Matches	4
Runs scored	101
Batting average	14.42
100s/50s	0/1
Top score	74
Balls bowled	84
Wickets	0
Bowling average	–
5 wickets in innings	0
10 wickets in match	0
Best bowling	0/12
Catches/stumpings	2/0
- Source: , 30 June 2016

Douglas Howe Adams (2 August 1876 – 27 January 1931) was an American cricketer, who played for the Gentlemen of Philadelphia in First class cricket.
