= Barbara Ellen Smith =

American author, educator, and activist

- Born: 1951 (age 74–75); Ann Arbor, Michigan
- Education: Antioch University; Brandeis University
- Scientific career
- Fields: Women's and Gender Studies, Sociology, Appalachian Studies
- Workplaces: Virginia Tech; University of Memphis
- Thesis: Digging Our Own Graves: Coal Miners and the Struggle Over Black Lung Disease (1981)

Barbara Ellen Smith is an American author, activist, and teacher. She is known for her involvement and writing about social justice in Appalachia, particularly the Black Lung Movement and advocacy for coal miners. Smith sustains her career of more than 40 years by continuing to make contributions in the intersecting disciplines of women's and gender studies, sociology, geography, and Appalachian studies as a professor and author.

== Early life and education ==
Smith was born in 1951 in Ann Arbor, Michigan and was raised in Indianapolis, Indiana to missionary parents from Appalachia. Smith attended schools where most of her classmates were African American during the peak of the Civil rights movement, making her conscious of the issues of race and inequality at a young age as she was the "only white kid in a neighborhood that was pretty much African American". As a result, she attributes her interest in racial justice to the ripple effects of the Civil Rights Movement in her local community. After graduating from high school in 1969, Smith went on to attend Antioch College in Yellow Springs, Ohio and graduated with a Bachelor of Arts degree in political science in 1973. She put her education on hiatus to teach at an elementary school in Anawalt, West Virginia and volunteer with a chapter of the Black Lung Association. Since both her parents were from Appalachia, she took advantage of this time in West Virginia as an opportunity to reconnect with her Appalachian roots. When she decided to return to school, she attended Brandeis University in Waltham, Massachusetts for her graduate studies. She completed her PhD in sociology in 1981. Her doctoral dissertation was titled "Digging Our Own Graves: Coal Miners and the Struggle over Black Lung Disease." This project presented a medical history of black lung disease, demonstrating how it is not just a physical condition but also a result of class relations and the socioeconomic circumstances related to the coal industry at the time.

== Career ==
Thanks to her research on black lung disease and the working conditions in coal mines, Smith gained an interest in studying occupational health and the issues that women workers face. In 1981, Smith was granted a National Science Foundation fellowship through which she was able to create a project surrounding women's occupational health and explore topics such as equal pay, representation in the work force, and other issues for working-class women. This work led her to serve as Director of Research and Education at the Southeast Women's Employment Coalition (SWEC) in Lexington, Kentucky for six years. She later became involved as a board member for the Highlander Research and Education Center, in which she served two different times for a total of about 12 years. Additionally, she was the Board Chair for two years.

While working on what would become Digging Our Own Graves: Coal Miners & the Struggle Over Black Lung Disease, Smith traveled to West Virginia to further research the decline of the coal industry in Appalachia, the economic and health crises coal miners face, and what the future looks like in terms of environmental justice in the region. She edited a book about economic issues in Appalachia titled Communities in Economic Crisis: Appalachia and the South, which was co-edited with John Gaventa and Alex Willingham, (Philadelphia: Temple University Press, 1990). She later edited another book about the conditions women face in the South titled Neither Separate nor Equal: Women, Race, and Class in the South (Philadelphia: Temple University Press, 1999). She has also contributed many articles and book chapters covering issues relating to gender, race, class, and immigration.

When Smith moved to Memphis, Tennessee in 1995, her work shifted to focus on immigration and working-class wages. She also worked to counteract the wage inequities between male and female professors at the University of Memphis by establishing support groups and networks for women at the university. Smith worked as the Director of the Women's Studies Program as well as the Director of the Center for Research on Women at the University of Memphis.

Smith transferred to Virginia Tech in 2005, where she served as the Women and Gender Studies Program Director and professor of Sociology. Smith was named professor emerita for her academic accomplishments and teaching experience in 2017. She currently also serves as a board member of the West Virginia Mine Wars Museum and Chair of the Museum Finance Committee.

== Recent work ==
While Barbara Ellen Smith's academic career can be divided into groups regarding Black Lung Movement, women's and gender issues, as well as race, in addition to immigration, her legacy proceeds her. She continues to write and edit, advocating for issues revolving around these topics. Her most recent work includes "Across Races and Nations: Building New Communities in the South". This project is a collaboration between the Center for Research on Women in Memphis, Tennessee, Highlander Research and Education Center in New Market, Tennessee, and the Southern Regional Council in Atlanta, Georgia.

The project sought to create alliances between Latinos, African Americans, and other Southerners, specifically those in the working class. The main goal was to explore through case studies of those who have been racially and economically exploited in the United States throughout the years.

Smith's contribution aimed to address these issues through the Southeast Regional Economic Justice Network (REJN). This network brings together many organizations that work with the poor, women as well as youth in the U.S., specifically in the South. REJN has initiated a special project in North Carolina that would address these injustices of those who are African American and Latino in the United States. The goal was to explore how this network could build sustainable relationships to challenge racism and thus initiate social change.

== Selected publications ==
- Smith, Barbara Ellen (2020). Digging Our Own Graves: Coal Miners & the Struggle over Black Lung Disease. Photography by Earl Dotter. Chicago, Illinois: Haymarket Books. ISBN 978-1-64259-275-7. OCLC 1140366608.
- Fisher, Stephen L.; Smith, Barbara Ellen, eds. (2012). Transforming Places: Lessons from Appalachia. University of Illinois Press.
- Smith, Barbara Ellen, ed. (1999). Neither Separate nor Equal: Women, Race, and Class in the South. Temple University Press.
- Gaventa, John; Smith, Barbara Ellen; Willingham, Alex, eds. (1989). Communities in Economic Crisis: Appalachia and the South. Temple University Press.
- Smith, B. E.; Parra, R.; Williams, S.; Lubell, D. Across races and nations: Building New Communities in the South https://www.intergroupresources.com/rc/Case%20Studies%20of%20Collaboration.pdf. Retrieved 2023-03-31.

== Awards and honors ==
Smith's honors include the ASPECT Outstanding Faculty Award, the Department of Sociology Outstanding Graduate Faculty Award, and the Department of Sociology Undergraduate Teaching Excellence Award. The Virginia Board of Visitors awarded her with the title of professor emerita in 2017.
