= Barbara Lee Smith =

American artist (born 1938)

Barbara Lee Smith (born 1 April 1938) is an American mixed media artist, writer, educator, and curator. She creates large scale landscapes and abstract works using a three step process of painting, collage, and machine stitching.

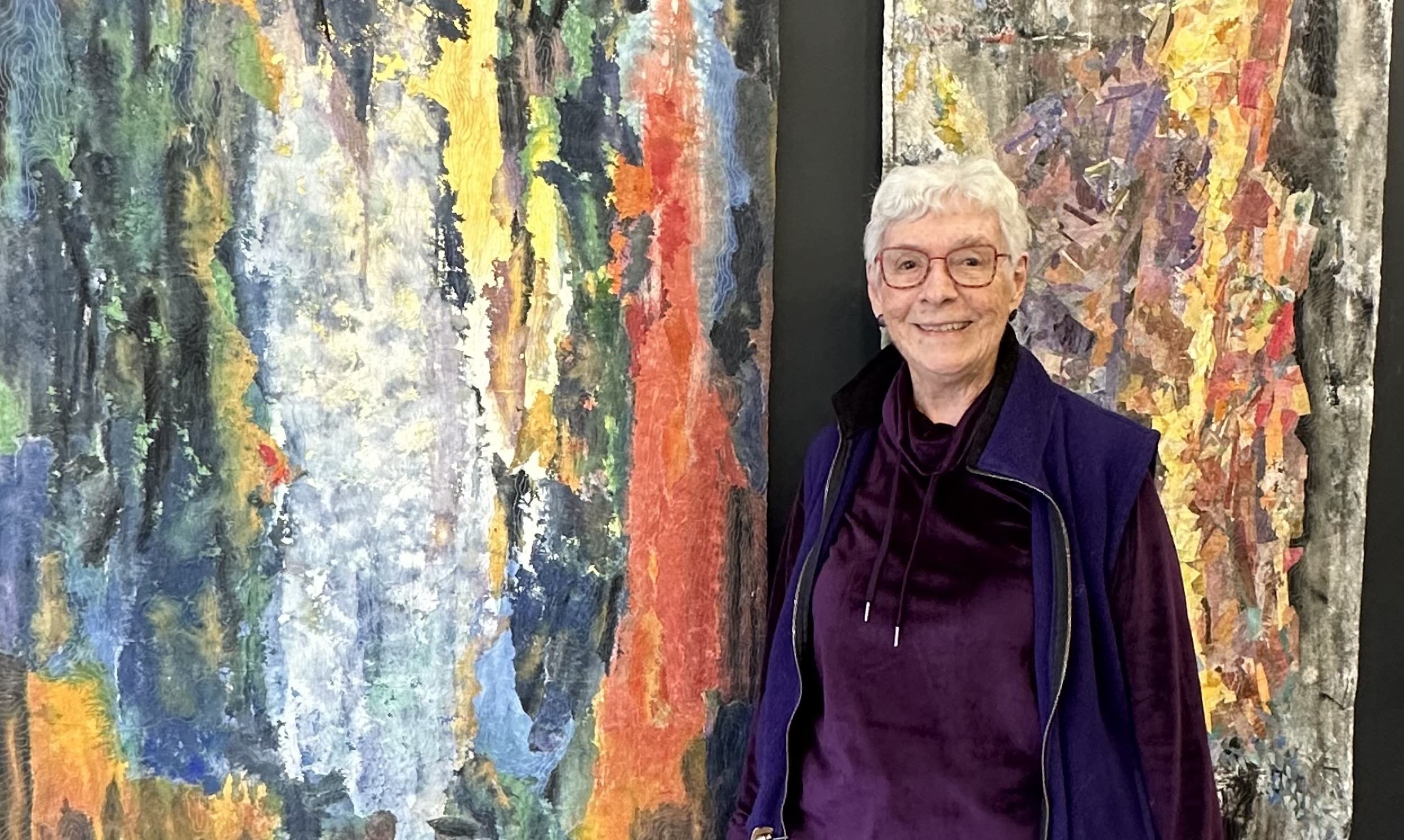
Barbara Lee Smith with Entrance (2015, to left) and That's How the Light (2024, to right)

== Early life ==
Barbara Lee Smith was born in Camden, New Jersey and grew up in nearby Cape May. Her early interests included music, embroidery and the ocean. She was first exposed to the work of Jackson Pollock in a 1949 Life magazine article. His free-wheeling approach impressed her 11-year old mind.

Smith majored in home economics at Douglass College (then the women's college of Rutgers University). She married soon after graduating in 1959 and, as a young wife and mother, lived in Levittown, New York on Long Island. In Levittown she had easy access to New York City where art exhibitions, most notably a Kandinsky show at the Guggenheim Museum, made an impact. During this period she taught herself machine embroidery.

In the late 1960s, Smith moved to Chicago where she resided for three decades in suburbs to the west of Lake Michigan. She started teaching contemporary embroidery and design while picking up undergraduate courses in drawing, color and design. She attended graduate school at Northern Illinois University where she received a MFA degree in mixed media in 1979.

In 2000, Smith and her second husband, Mel, relocated to the Pacific Northwest, where they lived and worked on Raft Island, west of Tacoma, Washington until 2017. They moved across the country to a loft building in the American Tobacco Historic District in downtown Durham, North Carolina. Her husband died in 2019. In 2020, she moved her studio into a larger apartment where she currently lives and works.

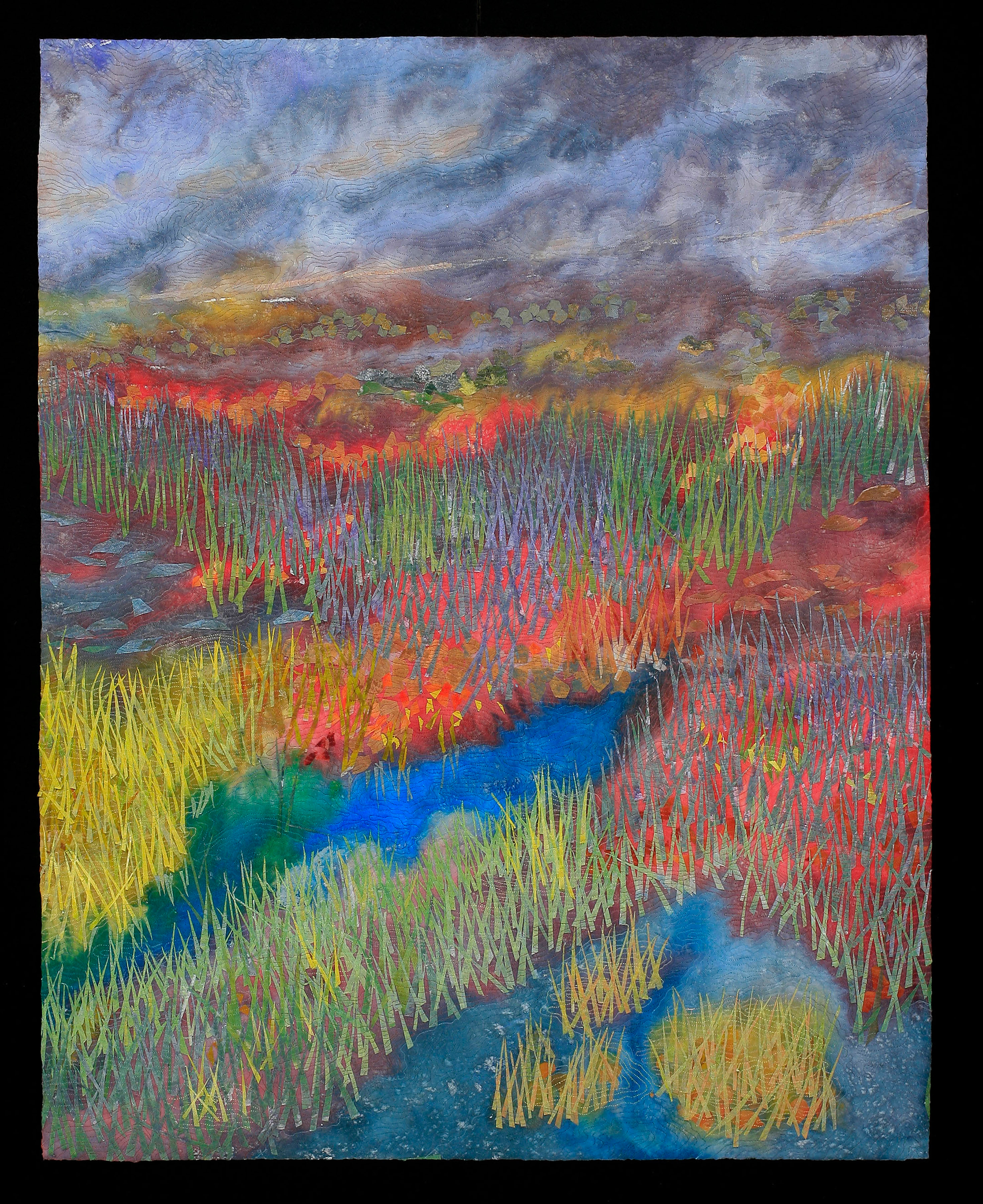
Marshland - Twilight (2010) by Barbara Lee Smith; 49.5" x 39" [private collection] photo by Tom Holt

== Career ==
Smith has worked as a self-employed studio artist since 1979. From her work in Chicago, which featured architectural elements, to her work in the Pacific Northwest, with its imagery of land, sea and sky, her work is ethereal and technically adept. In reviewing a 2009 exhibition of Smith's work, the late Carla Seaquist wrote:

In essence a seeker, Barbara's artistic purpose is to retrieve those lost things - meaning, mattering, beauty, wit, a sense of the sacred ... Barbara has been faithful to her inner landscapes. It's why her work resonates so deeply: she shows us profound things the modern world has forgotten but desperately needs.

Since 1975, her work has been featured in over 30 solo exhibitions in the US, UK, New Zealand and Japan. She's participated in dozens of invitational group exhibitions including the Bellevue Art Museum Fiber Biennial, Korea Quilt Festival and the Beijing Art Salon. In a review of a 1989 group exhibition on Long Island, The New York Times called Smith's current work "off beat and personal."

... her work cannot be pigeonholed into any category. The artist sprays uncolored dyes on cotton or silk fabrics. The dyes stain, flow together and mix, but the hues do not become visible until the fabric has been exposed to light. Off Beat and Personal. To add texture, Ms. Smith machine-stitches large areas. Again her approach is off beat and personal. By loosening the bobbin tension and tightening the needle tension the stitching results in a series of loops. Most seamstresses would moan and rip out the threads if this were to happen to their seams, but here the looped stitching is repeated back and forth across an area, until it resembles the glistening pile of a nylon rug. Occasional gold threads, flecked with metallic red and green, scintillate like sparklers. Framed and hung together as a unit of six rectangular modules, the flowing shapes take on an organized interrelationship.

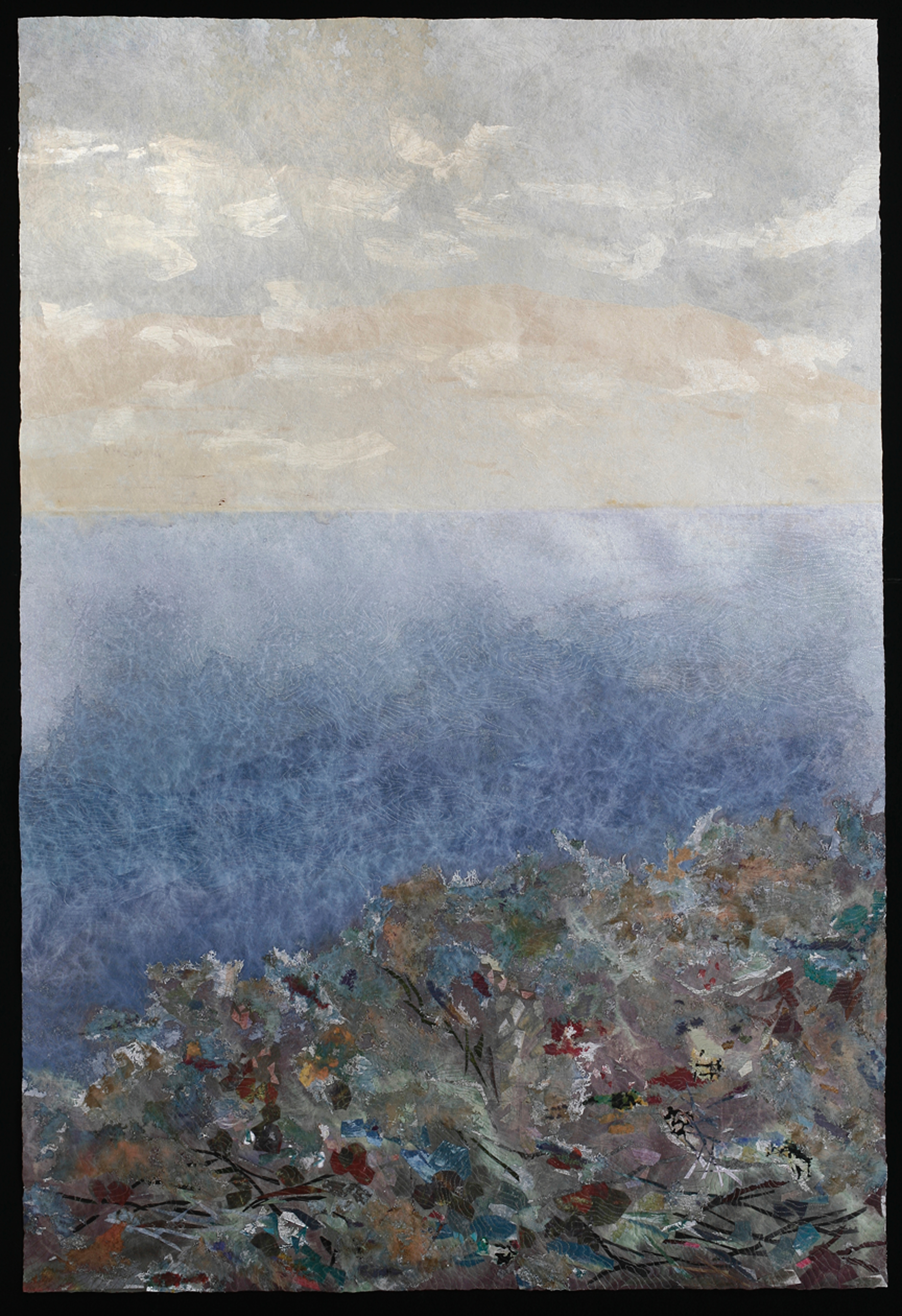
Daybreak (2013) by Barbara Lee Smith; 6' x 4' [collection of Pat Jackson, Durham NC]; photo by Tom Holt

Smith also contributes to her field through teaching, writing and curatorial work. From 2000-2005, she served as a visiting professor in the Department of Design and Embroidery at Joshibi College of Art and Design in Tokyo; conducted workshops and lectures at Stik Plus in the Netherlands between 1999 and 2014; and served as a visiting lecturer at Windsor College, England between 1991 and 2004. She has curated textile exhibitions in Massachusetts, Chicago, New Zealand, and North Carolina.

Smith authored the book Celebrating the Stitch: Contemporary Embroidery of North America, published by Taunton Press in 1991. It outlines the movement of embroidery from the home into the artist's studio through a series of interviews with textile artists. The book includes a range of textile mixed media examples; it also explores creative issues and how to address them.

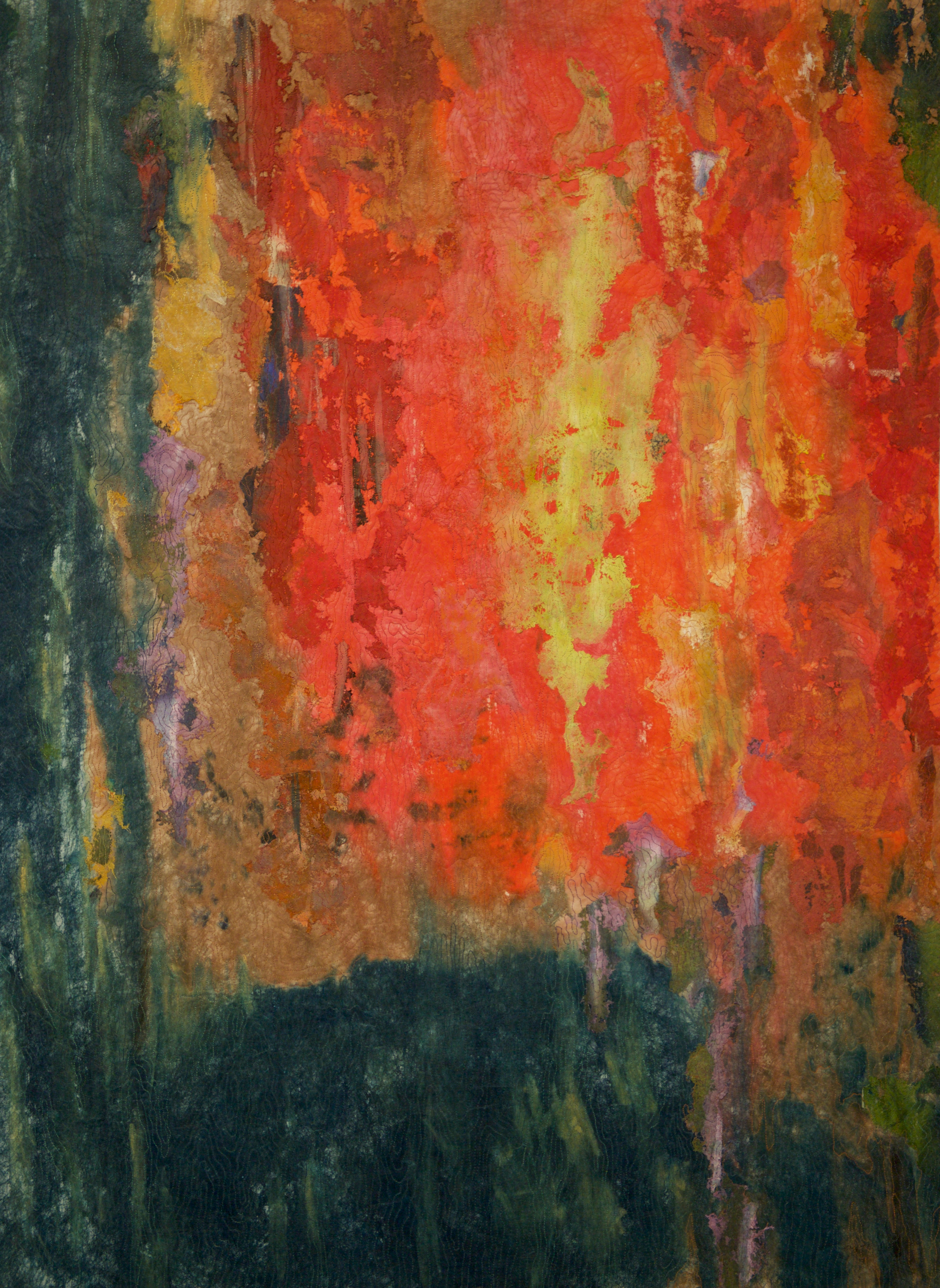
A Gathering of Light (2015) by Barbara Lee Smith; 49.5" x 39"; photo by Igor Beschieru

Smith has been honored for her work by the Pierce County (Washington) Art Commission's Career Award, named an honorary member of the Embroiderers' Guild of England, as well as Distinguished Resident by the Ragdale Foundation. A lengthy 2009 interview with Smith, part of the Archives of American Art Oral History Program, is available from the Smithsonian's Archives of American Art.

Smith writes: "a personal goal has been to help the field of textiles be recognized as a major art form and to see that those who use fiber as their primary medium are recognized within the larger world of art."

In 2015, Smith wrote about the evolution of her work:

Growing up in Cape May, New Jersey brought me into everyday contact with the Atlantic Ocean, and much of my life has been spent finding my way from one coast to the other. The urge to be near salt water infused my work while living in Chicago for many years, and as I finally landed more than fifteen years ago in the Pacific Northwest on a small island in Puget Sound, my work evolved from non-representation images to evocations of the land, sea and sky.

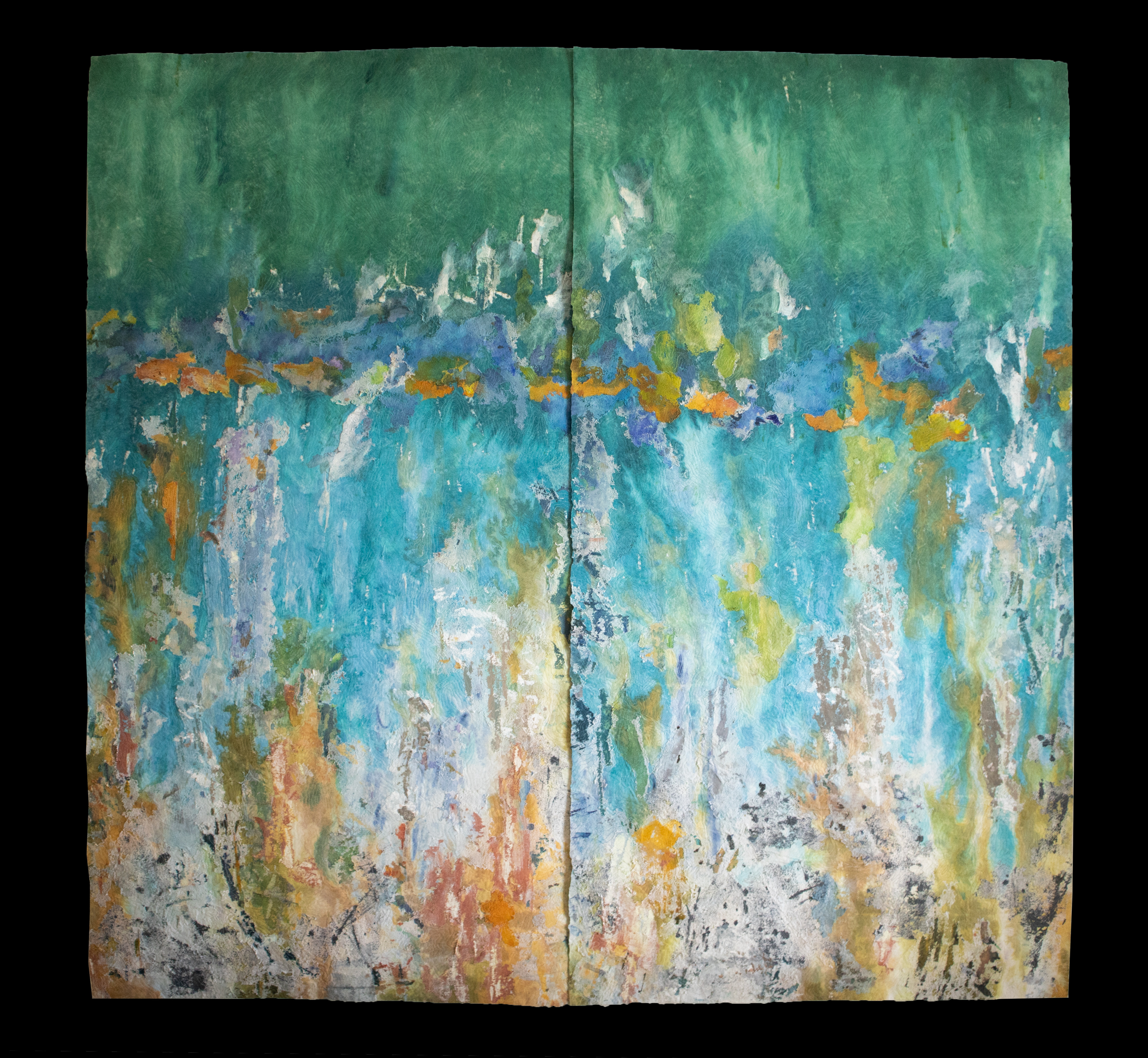
Hull #1 (2018) by Barbara Lee Smith; 80" x 80"; photo by Sam McClayton

== Technique ==
Smith uses a single material: an industrial grade polyester non woven fabric, Lutradur. She uses it as a canvas for acrylics chosen for light fastness. She creates a painting on the tough fabric, then bonds several layers together to form a base on which she collages small pieces of the painted material, heat setting them in place.

To bind the work together, Smith then "draws with the sewing machine" in lines which resemble a topographical map. Smith describes her technique as "a three-stage process of painting, collage and drawing."

Smith works on a large scale. In a 2000 review of a Philadelphia exhibition, the James Renwick Alliance Quarterly noted that the works were "breathtaking in scale, particularly Barbara Lee Smith's fused synthetic fabric pilings, the smallest being a mere 7 1/2 feet while the largest was a towering 9 feet." More recent works, pictured in this article, are also large scale.

Beginning in 2024, Smith has chosen to use the abundance of fragments left over from large-scale works. These pieces of previously painted Lutradur form a "palette of thousands of choices." She speaks of balancing chaos and control. Her work continues to reflect on and respond to nature, with memories of living near the shore as she maintains an urban home.

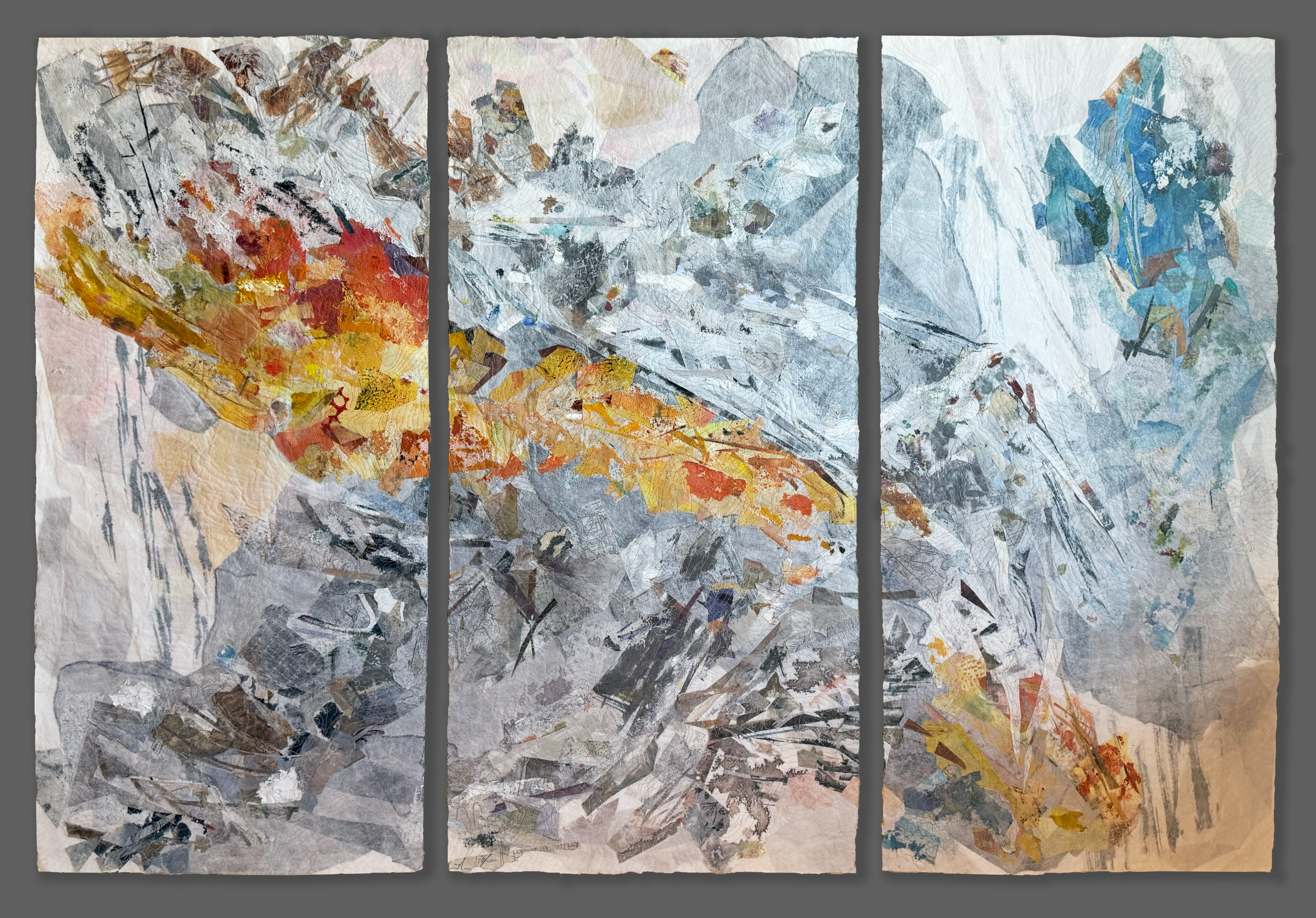
Dancing Past No (2025) by Barbara Lee Smith; 4' x 6'; photo by Sam McClayton

== Selected institutional collections ==
- American Embassies in Peru and Sri Lanka
- American Medical Association, Chicago, Illinois
- Arrowmont School of Crafts, Gatlinburg, Tennessee
- Embroiderers' Guild Museum, UK
- Gregg Museum, NC State University, Raleigh, North Carolina
- Indianapolis Museum of Art, Indianapolis, Indiana
- Racine Art Museum, Racine, Wisconsin
- Renwick Gallery, Smithsonian Institution, Washington DC
- Swiss-Bernina International, Steckborn, Switzerland
- Tacoma Art Museum, Tacoma, Washington
- Tacoma Community College, Tacoma, Washington
- University of North Carolina at Asheville
- University of North Carolina at Chapel Hill
