= Nightlife legislation of the United States =

Overview of the nightlife legislation in the United States of America

Nightlife legislation of the United States is mostly in local jurisdiction of the city or state.

== New York City, New York ==
From 1926 to 2017, the New York City Cabaret Law prohibited dancing in all spaces open to the public that sell food and/or drink with the exception of those who obtain a cabaret license.

In 2006, in response to a number of murders which occurred in the New York City area (some involving nightclubs and bouncer), additional legislation was enacted affecting many areas of nightlife.

== Boston, Massachusetts ==
On March 14, 2007, Boston Mayor Thomas Menino had signed Imette's Law, named after murder victim Imette St. Guillen, which would make it mandatory for nightclub and bar owners to conduct criminal background checks on bouncers and to set up security video cameras outside the establishment. This law was proposed by Boston City Councillor Michael Flaherty and was passed unanimously.

Imette's Law was also enacted in New York State.

== Shreveport, Louisiana ==
The city of Shreveport, Louisiana is also considering a 58-point plan made in New York City. St. Guillen and Jennifer Moore, both killed in the New York City area, were mentioned.

== Tulsa, Oklahoma ==
In 2008, Oklahoma City councilman Skip Kelly, seeking to curb club violence, wanted the city of Tulsa to pass an abatement law letting police focus more on nightclubs with various violations. This move was after the shooting of 19-year-old Kascey McClelland at Club Zax. It was reported that police have little clues in the shooting. McClelland died within a week of the six bullet shooting, which occurred in the club's parking lot.

It was also reported that in 2006 that police investigated six shootings, and in 2008 responded to about 700 calls at six of the city's nightclubs. The article stated that "Law enforcement officers blame the violence on youthful immaturity, alcohol, a growing gang problem or on the number of guns on the street."

Kelly indicated that the city's nuisance and abatement ordinance, which was originally designed to control drug use and prostitution will be revised to include violence, loitering and underage drinking. He said:

We are looking at some language that would give full notice to these club owners, and give police and council stronger laws that they can act on; We are looking at something that would withstand any constitutional challenges.

In discussing the violence in these clubs, Kelly said:

We are talking about saving children's lives along with the adults. If the owners say it's a problem in the parking lot we need to hold someone accountable. ... We want accountability for these proprietors. We will withdraw their application or revoke their license.

There was discussion of existing fire codes, overcrowding in the clubs and past murders.

== Richmond, Virginia ==
A judge in Richmond, Judge Melvin R. Hughes Jr., refused to halt liquor sales in Cotton Club nightclub, a club that had been allegedly linked to gun shootings and violence. It was indicated by the judge's ruling, however, that the city failed to prove a link to the violence and the business. The police indicated that seven people had either been shot, stabbed or beaten in the vicinity of the club, although no one had been killed. It was reported that part of the Cotton Club would be closed but the restaurant and lounge portion that was downstairs would remain open. Fourth Precinct Commander, John Hall said he was disappointed with the judge's decision and said that the department wanted improvements. Officer schedules would be changed for additional support on weekend nights. It was also reported that neighbors and the Downtown Neighborhood Association were also concerned.

== See also ==
- Sean Bell shooting incident
- Murder of Jennifer Moore
- Murder of Imette St. Guillen
