= 2006 nightlife legislation in New York City =

Legislation in New York City, New York, U.S.

The 2006 nightlife legislation in New York City was enacted on August 23, 2006 in response to violent crime involving nightclubs in the New York City area. One of the first measures to come about was a three-point plan proposed by New York City Council Speaker Christine Quinn in her August 8, 2006 memorandum.

== Background ==
In early 2006, seven-year-old Nixzmary Brown was murdered. This was within a short time of another murder of a young criminology student. The recollection of Brown's murder was refocused in February, after another murder was brought to the New York City public's attention: the brutal torture, rape, and strangulation murder of Imette St. Guillen, a 25-year-old John Jay College graduate student, whose killing and associated lurid details later captured the nation's attention. St. Guillen's murder, which was related to a bar and a bouncer with a criminal record, brought public attention on New York City's nightlife. There were protests against The Falls bar, accusing its owner of delaying investigation by lying to police. Public discussion of nightlife followed.

The June 18 murder of a 16-year-old student, Chanel Petro-Nixon, and the July 25 rape and murder of another student, 19-year-old Jennifer Moore, gave cause to public concern and the publication of the article series "Wasteland," which was written by the New York Post. A Post columnist, Andrea Peyser, speculated that the three murders were connected:

It's open season on young girls. An 18-year-old was found murdered this week in Jersey, allegedly by a man who took her from Manhattan after a night of underage clubbing. In February, graduate student Imette St. Guillen was taken from a SoHo bar and killed, allegedly by the bouncer. But the case of Chanel Petro-Nixon stands out for three reasons: She went missing in broad daylight, blocks from her house – not at night, coming out of a bar.

Such articles discussed fake I.D. use, alcoholic drinking among underage teenagers, and discussion of New York City nightlife in general. Some of the Post articles mentioned accounts of gun-shooting violence involving bouncers. One such bouncer, Stephen Sakai, used a gun to kill some club patrons at Opus 22, which further brought the public's focus on nightlife and bouncers. Sakai was later convicted and sentenced to 90 years in prison.

In November 2006, Sean Bell was shot and killed. More such incidents that were reported in bars and nightclubs in 2007.

In 2009, 17-year-old Nyasia Pryear-Yard, an honors student, was shot to death while attending a party at the Elks Plaza Club in Brooklyn. A suspected gang member, who investigators believe may belong to either the Bloods or the Crips, had brought a weapon past security. The family called for stricter safeguards for late-night parties.

== Places ==
=== Columbia University ===
The Columbia Spectator noted that Radio Perfecto had closed but that the nearby Village Pourhouse had stayed open. The article noted the attempts to balance students, the local crowds of people, and neighborhood residents and the attempts made to update the security of area bars. The latter bar later closed as well.

=== Chelsea nightclubs ===
The New York Post focused on 16-year-olds attending nightclubs, specifically in Chelsea, in the west of Manhattan. It was noted that it was very easy for teenagers to obtain fake ID cards. Several bar owners were interviewed on the problems of verifying the legitimacy of ID cards, as fake cards were very convincing in appearance; identity theft was also discussed.

The New York Times, in one article, called the nightclubs "playground[s]" fraught with dangers such as drunk young women leaving the clubs in the early morning hours.

Senator Nicholas Spano had scheduled a hearing on September 7, 2006, to discuss the existing liquor laws and how these laws were being enforced. The article mentioned both Moore and St. Guillen. Spano discussed the Chelsea nightlife areas and the liquor laws and focused on underage drinkers. By September 2006, the Nightlife Summit had been discussed on one website catering to nightlife and on the City Council's website.

In the "Wasteland" series, one of the front-page headlines featured a photo of Jennifer Moore, juxtaposed with one showing a young teenage girl lying drunk on the sidewalk, along with a story on how commonly that occurred. One city block allegedly had 5000 young people entering a bar on that block every weekend night.

Councilwoman Melinda Katz sought to change the minimum age for entry into bars from 16 to 18. Ron Bookman, who represented the New York Nightlife Association, accused Katz of grandstanding and predicted that her legislation would never get beyond the draft stage. Bookman wanted all the legislators to attend the summit hearing in September 2006. He disagreed with the report's recommendations and felt that officials would use the recommendations to target bars unfairly. A later article also discussing underage drinking again mentioned murder victim Jennifer Moore.

==== Incidents ====
Scores West nightclub, on West 28th Street, reportedly had its liquor license suspended by the State Liquor Authority for allowing prostitution on its premises. Undercover policemen discovered women selling sex in the various club premises. Manhattan Supreme Court Justice Walter Tolub granted a stay of the SLA order, pulling the license of the club. Pending an appeal by the SLA, the club was allowed to continue to serve alcohol.

A man was stabbed repeatedly by several women during a violent confrontation near the Vesta nightclub, on 29th Street and Eighth Avenue, on March 21, 2008. Possibly 30 people were involved in the incident, which resulted in the man being sent to the hospital in critical condition.

Laura Garza, a 25‑year‑old, went missing on December 3, 2008. She had been last seen leaving a nightclub named Marquee at approximately 4:00 a.m., allegedly with a registered sex offender. In April 2010, the remains of Garza's body were found by the police.

=== Hell Square ===
The Office investigated complaints of rowdiness in a part of the Lower East Side called "Hell Square" in the 2010s.

== Factors ==
=== Fake ID cards ===
Fake ID cards had been discussed in connection with Moore and her access to clubs, even before her death. Moore's death reportedly had little effect on teenagers' behavior, and the view of teenagers saw the clubs as "cool," the provocative clothing being worn by young women enhanced clubs' reputation. The Bergen Record stated:

It's not that kids have never before tried to finesse their way past the bouncers at New York's downtown clubs for a night of fun and drink. It's been done a million times and all it took was borrowed credentials – or a forged license – in the wink-and-nod nighttown of Chelsea, the West Village and Tribeca.

The New York City Police Department, by 2007, had been focusing on fake ID. It arrested teenagers in Chelsea and padlocked Club Crobar, Pink Elephant, and Club Sol for numerous drug violations. It was backing laws proposed by the City Council that the police's powers. The police department wanted the New York City Council to give it expanded powers under the Nuisance Abatement Law, which would enable it to close businesses if violent crimes had been committed there and to close businesses that sell fake I.D. cards.

In March 2007, more legislation to enforce security and to prevent fake ID cards was being considered, and Mayor Bloomberg indicated that he would sign the bills. By October 2007, Quinn was backing a state lawmaker's proposal to revoke the alcohol licenses of establishments that served underage drinkers.

The New York Post also reported that it was easy to steal identities from the New York State Department of Motor Vehicles. There was much ease in obtaining such IDs, and Long Island state Senator Charles Fuschillo Jr., an anti-ID-theft crusader, was caught unaware of this fact. A DMV spokesman said there was no plan to stop the program or to make it more secure because duplicate licenses needed to be made for legitimate motorists and it was illegal to possess multiple people's driver's licenses in any case.

Democratic Queens Councilwoman Melinda Katz started drafting legislation on drinking. It would outlaw nightclubs from requiring patrons to purchase bottles of alcohol to guarantee seating. Eight out of the twelve clubs in and around Chelsea that were surveyed by Katz's staff imposed the "bottle service" requirement, including the club in which Moore had been seen.

=== Bouncers ===
Bouncers were also discussed as a possible factor to underage drinking. Bouncers are doormen and can decide whether people are allowed into a bar establishment. It was a factor in St. Guillen's murder. Sakai's firearm shooting of bar patrons was also discussed.

On November 14, 2007, it was reported that around the city, the bars were changing their regulations, based on City Council and Police recommendations.

== Legislation and legal actions ==
Quinn followed up her initial August 8, 2006 memorandum with another one, calling for more safety and mentioning an upcoming Summit Meeting. The measures taken in the latter memorandum included the following:

1. Curbing underage drinking
2. Improving club safety
3. Increasing street and transportation safety

Spano scheduled a hearing for September 7, 2006 to discuss the existing liquor laws and how they were being enforced.

Later, a "Nightlife Summit" was held in St. Guillen's alma mater, John Jay College of Criminal Justice. Attendees included Quinn, who had organized the summit; Commissioner Kelly; John Feinblatt, Mayor Bloomberg's criminal-justice coordinator; David Rabin, president of the New York Nightlife Association and co-owner of Lotus; Nightlife Association founder, Andrew Raseij; and various club owners. They made the following points:

- The participants agreed that the police must help nightclub owners keep the peace.
- Better regulation is needed of the $10 billion-a-year industry.
- A new city office dedicated to the regulation might be created.
- Club owners desired the police to provide a "paid-detail" to hire off-duty cops to patrol the area outside their bars.

However, Kelly was against the idea of using off-duty police because he had said again that it both was illegal and would breed corruption between the police and bar owners. Another opponent to the recommendation, Mayor Bloomberg's criminal-justice coordinator, John Feinblatt, said that "it violates the law." Rabin indicated that it did not have to be specifically a NYPD security detail but that security was urgently required.

Club owners also wanted Bloomberg to create an "Office of Nightclub Affairs" to operate as a liaison between the industry and government. It was mentioned that approximately 65 million people visit New York City bars and clubs each year, which created $10 billion profits for the city annually. Both parties in the discussions agreed that more action was needed to curb underage drinking, including the elimination of fake IDs and the raising the age limit for bars and clubs.

There was also a discussion about creating a campaign to remind clubgoers to remain quiet when they left bars and to call the police if there is a safety issue. Some bar owners also complained that the smoking ban made it more difficult to keep the streets quiet at night. Quinn said:

I know that we can make nightlife safer in the city of New York. We are not interested in putting the nightlife industry out of business in the city. In fact, when I met with Imette St. Guillen's mother, she made a point of the fact that that is not what she wants.

The council eventually introduced four pieces of legislation to help combat these problems, including Imette's Law, which required stronger background checks for bouncers. Among the legislative actions taken were the requirement of ID scanners, security cameras, and independent monitors to oversee problem establishments. It also enacted the following plan:

- Create a city Office of Nightlife Affairs.
- Find ways to get more police officers to patrol outside clubs and bars.
- Combat underage drinking and the use of fake ID.
- Foster better relationship among club owners, the NYPD, and the New York State Liquor Authority
- Raise the age limit for admittance into a club or bar from 16 to 18 or 21.
- Develop a public-awareness campaign urging patrons to be safe at night.
- Examine zoning laws to help neighborhoods that are flooded with clubs and bars.

Meanwhile, the murder of Moore put more focus on New York City's nightlife. Issues brought to the forefront of public thinking in that case were the underage drinking and fake identification cards that are obtained by teenagers illegally to obtain access to bars.

=== Immete's Law ===
On March 14, 2007, Boston Mayor Thomas Menino signed Imette's Law, named after St. Guillen, to make it mandatory for nightclub and bar owners to conduct criminal background checks on bouncers and to set up security video cameras outside the establishment. The law was proposed by Boston City Councilor Michael Flaherty and was passed unanimously. Imette's Law was also enacted in New York State.

=== New guideline book ===
A new guideline booklet, NYPD and Nightlife Association Announce "Best Practices, was unveiled on October 18, 2007. The voluntary rulebook included a 58-point security plan, drafted in part by the New York Nightlife Association, and was further recommended by Police Commissioner Ray Kelly and Speaker Quinn. Security measures included cameras outside nightclub bathrooms, a trained security guard for every 75 patrons, and weapons searches for everyone, including celebrities, entering the clubs. The new regulation resulted in stricter penalties for serving underage persons.

=== NYPD Club Enforcement Initiative ===
The Club Enforcement Initiative was created by the NYPD in response to what it referred to as "a series of high-profile and violent crimes against people who visited city nightclubs this year." The July 27 rape and murder of Jennifer Moore was mentioned. One article discussed the dangers of police work and undercover investigations. Bloomberg had met with Kelly and community leaders to discuss how undercover police had shot Sean Bell and two of his friends as they had celebrated his last night as a bachelor outside of the Kalua Cabaret strip club in Queens. Bell, who was unarmed, was set to marry later that day his high-school sweetheart and the mother of his two young daughters.

The Club Enforcement Initiative was later mentioned in an article discussing the impact and the changes in nightlife as well as the death of Bell. The article mentioned St. Guillen and Moore as well.

Chelsea residents were reportedly grateful for the increased police presence of the many local bars.

The Club Enforcement Unit also tried to close another club, Stereo, after a patron was shot. Four other clubs were said to have been breaking the new rules.

=== ID scanners ===
In August 2006, the New York City Council started initiatives to correct the problems highlighted by the deaths of Moore and St. Guillen. There was also discussions about electronic ID scanners. Quinn reportedly threatened to revoke the licenses of bars and clubs without scanners.

== NYPD Safety Manual update ==
In September 2011, the NYPD Nightlife Association updated its Safety Manual Handbook. There is now a section on counterterrorism, after planned terrorist attacks on certain bars and clubs worldwide.
