= Discwoman =

Creative music agency

- Formation: 2014
- Type: Artist management, Booking agency
- Location: US
- Origin: New York City
- Founders: Frankie Decaiza Hutchinson, Christine McCharen-Tran, Emma Burgess-Olson
- Website: http://www.discwoman.com

Discwoman is a New York-based collective, booking agency, and event platform representing and showcasing women and non-binary artists in the electronic music community. It was founded in 2014 by Frankie Decaiza Hutchinson, Emma Burgess-Olson (Umfang), and Christine McCharen-Tran. Discwoman aims to address issues of gender imbalance in club and festival lineups.

== Artist roster ==
Discwoman roster as of August 2022.

- Ariel Zetina
- Ashley Venom
- BEARCAT
- Bergsonist
- bronz3 g0dd3ss
- Ciel
- Fauzia
- Juana
- Juliana Huxtable
- mobilegirl
- Riobamba
- SHYBOI
- Ziúr

== Events ==
Since its inaugural event at Bushwick, Brooklyn’s Bossa Nova Civic Club, Discwoman has presented showcases in Boston, Detroit's Movement Festival, Mexico City, Montreal, Philadelphia, Pittsburgh's VIA Festival, San Juan, Seattle's Decibel Festival, and Toronto.

Co-founder Hutchinson, was involved in the 2017 campaign that repealed New York's anti-dancing Cabaret Law claiming it contained a disproportionate targeting of black and other minority communities. Hutchinson curated the Dweller Festival, promoting black underground talent in New York City.
