= Villas, New Jersey =

Place in Cape May County, New Jersey, United States

- Census-designated place
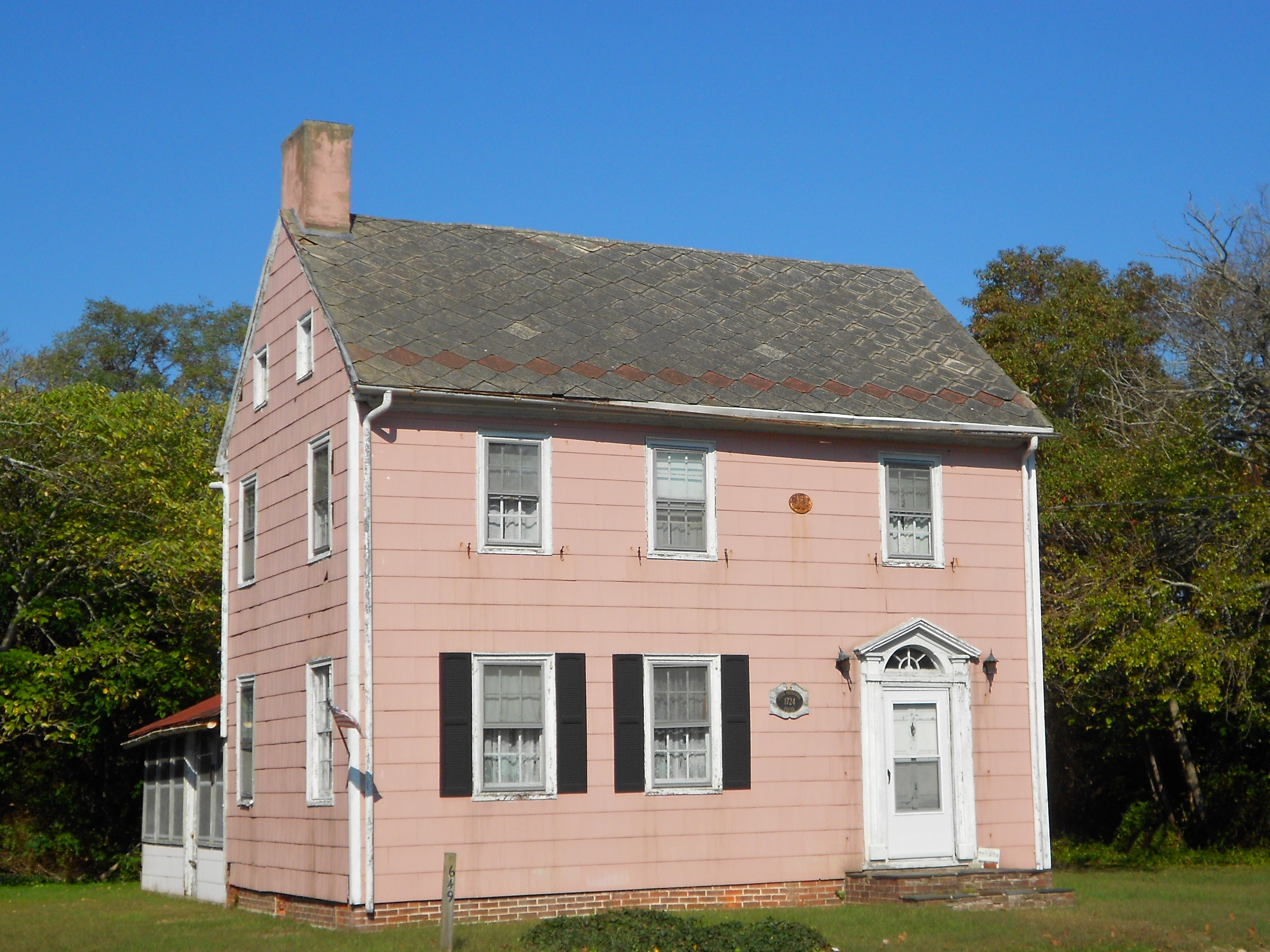
- Judge Nathaniel Foster House

- Map of Villas highlighted within Cape May County. Right: Location of Cape May County in New Jersey.

- Location in Cape May County Location in New Jersey Location in the United States
- Coordinates: 39.016266°N 74.935969°W
- Country: United States
- State: New Jersey
- County: Cape May
- Township: Lower

Area
  - Total: 3.93 sq mi (10.18 km^{2})
  - Land: 3.90 sq mi (10.11 km^{2})
  - Water: 0.027 sq mi (0.07 km^{2}) 0.66%
- Elevation: 16 ft (5 m)

Population (2020)
  - Total: 9,134
  - Density: 2,339.7/sq mi (903.38/km^{2})
- Time zone: UTC−05:00 (Eastern (EST))
  - Summer (DST): UTC−04:00 (Eastern (EDT))
- ZIP Code: 08251
- Area code: 609
- FIPS code: 34-76010
- GNIS feature ID: 02390438

Villas, also known as the Villas, is an unincorporated community and census-designated place (CDP) located within Lower Township, in Cape May County, in the U.S. state of New Jersey. The locality is also home to the community of Miami Beach. As of the 2020 census, Villas had a population of 9,134.

Villas is served by ZIP code 08251, which extends northward of Miami Beach to encompass the Del Haven community of Middle Township.

== Geography ==
According to the United States Census Bureau, the CDP had a total area of 3.909 square miles (10.12 km^{2}), including 3.883 square miles (10.06 km^{2}) of land and 0.026 square miles (0.067 km^{2}) of water (0.66%).

== Demographics ==
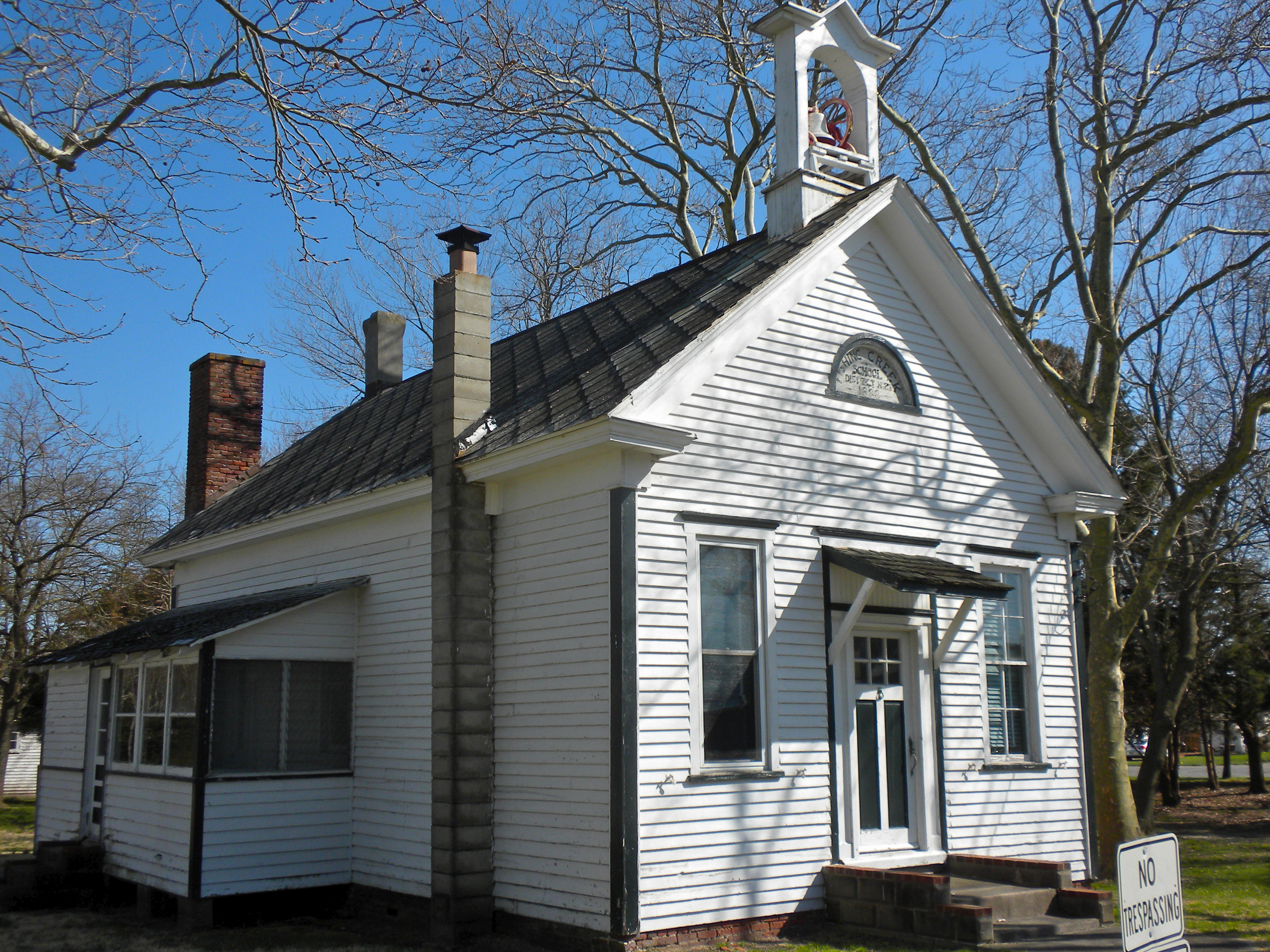
Fishing Creek Schoolhouse on Bayshore Drive is listed on the National Register of Historic Places.

Historical population
Census	Pop.	Note	%±
1960	2,085		—
1970	3,155		51.3%
1980	5,909		87.3%
1990	8,136		37.7%
2000	9,064		11.4%
2010	9,483		4.6%
2020	9,134		−3.7%
Population sources: 1970-1980; 1950 1960 1970; 1980 1990 2000; 2010 2020

Villas appeared as an unincorporated community in the 1960 U.S. census; and then was listed as a census designated place in the 1980 U.S. census.

=== 2020 census ===
As of the 2020 census, Villas had a population of 9,134. The median age was 46.8 years. 18.8% of residents were under the age of 18 and 22.8% of residents were 65 years of age or older. For every 100 females there were 92.9 males, and for every 100 females age 18 and over there were 89.8 males age 18 and over.

98.9% of residents lived in urban areas, while 1.1% lived in rural areas.

There were 3,834 households in Villas, of which 23.8% had children under the age of 18 living in them. Of all households, 41.0% were married-couple households, 18.8% were households with a male householder and no spouse or partner present, and 30.5% were households with a female householder and no spouse or partner present. About 30.2% of all households were made up of individuals and 15.3% had someone living alone who was 65 years of age or older.

There were 5,910 housing units, of which 35.1% were vacant. The homeowner vacancy rate was 2.1% and the rental vacancy rate was 4.4%.

Racial composition as of the 2020 census
Race	Number	Percent
White	7,929	86.8%
Black or African American	207	2.3%
American Indian and Alaska Native	27	0.3%
Asian	41	0.4%
Native Hawaiian and Other Pacific Islander	2	0.0%
Some other race	335	3.7%
Two or more races	593	6.5%
Hispanic or Latino (of any race)	854	9.3%

=== 2010 census ===
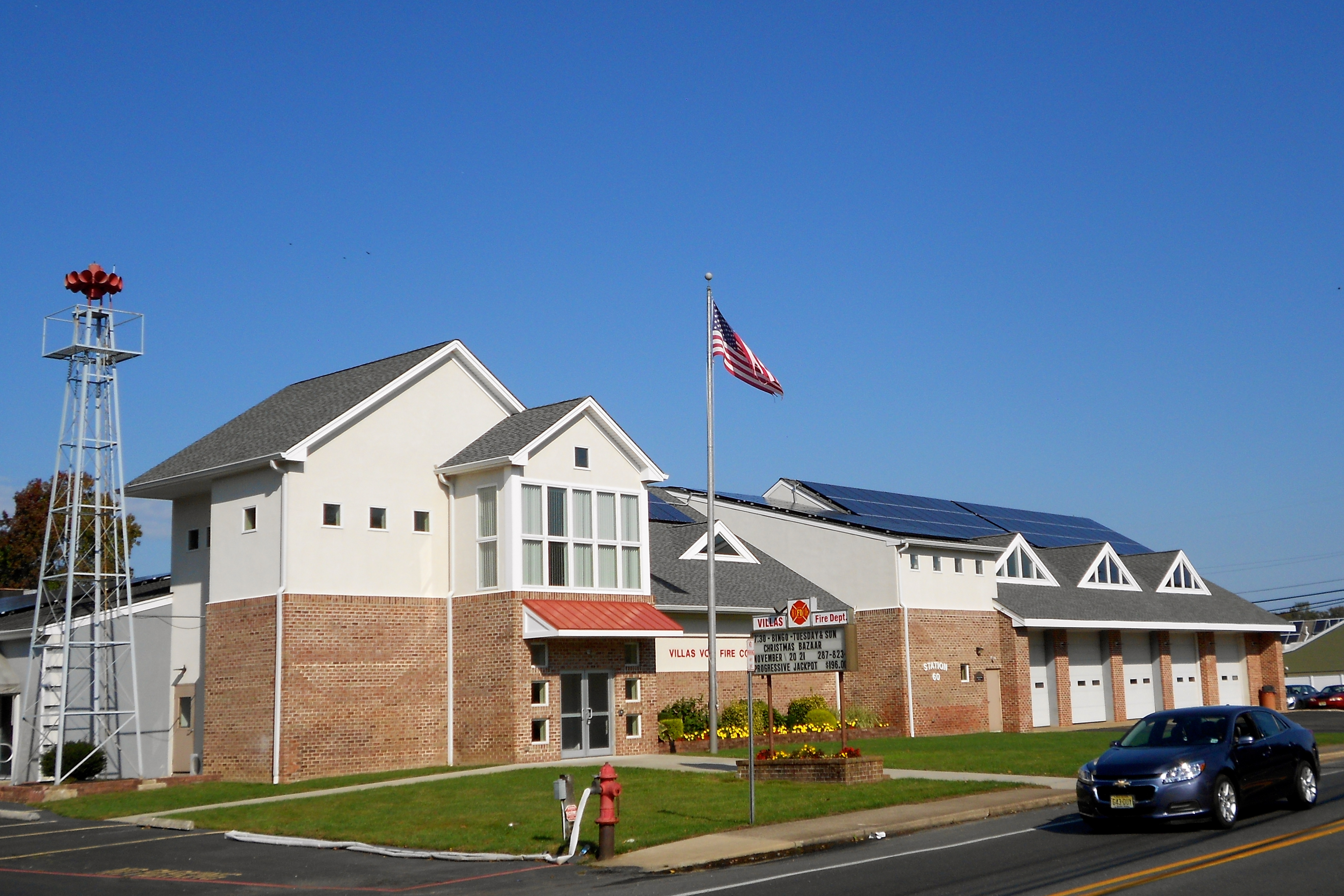
Villas Fire Department

The 2010 United States census counted 9,483 people, 3,896 households, and 2,567 families in the CDP. The population density was 2,442.0 people per square mile (942.9 people/km^{2}). There were 5,849 housing units at an average density of 1,506.2 units per square mile (581.5 units/km^{2}). The racial makeup was 93.49% (8,866) White, 1.95% (185) Black or African American, 0.17% (16) Native American, 0.33% (31) Asian, 0.06% (6) Pacific Islander, 1.76% (167) from other races, and 2.24% (212) from two or more races. Hispanic or Latino of any race were 6.18% (586) of the population.

Of the 3,896 households, 25.0% had children under the age of 18; 44.6% were married couples living together; 15.2% had a female householder with no husband present and 34.1% were non-families. Of all households, 28.5% were made up of individuals and 13.9% had someone living alone who was 65 years of age or older. The average household size was 2.43 and the average family size was 2.95.

22.3% of the population were under the age of 18, 8.3% from 18 to 24, 22.9% from 25 to 44, 28.8% from 45 to 64, and 17.7% who were 65 years of age or older. The median age was 42.1 years. For every 100 females, the population had 89.7 males. For every 100 females ages 18 and older there were 86.8 males.

=== 2000 census ===
At the 2000 census there were 9,064 people, 3,733 households, and 2,456 families in the CDP. The population density was 881.5 people/km^{2} (2,283 people/mi^{2}). There were 5,694 housing units at an average density of 553.8 units/km^{2} (1,434 units/mi^{2}). The racial makeup of the CDP was 96.35% White, 1.19% African American, 0.28% Native American, 0.35% Asian, 0.03% Pacific Islander, 0.86% from other races, and 0.94% from two or more races. Hispanic or Latino of any race were 2.41% of the population.

Of the 3,733 households 28.9% had children under the age of 18 living with them, 47.9% were married couples living together, 13.3% had a female householder with no husband present, and 34.2% were non-families. 29.5% of households were one person and 15.5% were one person aged 65 or older. The average household size was 2.43 and the average family size was 2.98.

The age distribution was 25.6% under the age of 18, 6.6% from 18 to 24, 26.5% from 25 to 44, 22.3% from 45 to 64, and 19.1% 65 or older. The median age was 39 years. For every 100 females, there were 91.9 males. For every 100 females age 18 and over, there were 86.4 males.

The median household income was $33,563 and the median family income was $38,950. Males had a median income of $32,996 versus $21,723 for females. The per capita income for the CDP was $16,696. About 8.3% of families and 10.4% of the population were below the poverty line, including 14.3% of those under age 18 and 5.8% of those age 65 or over.

== Education ==
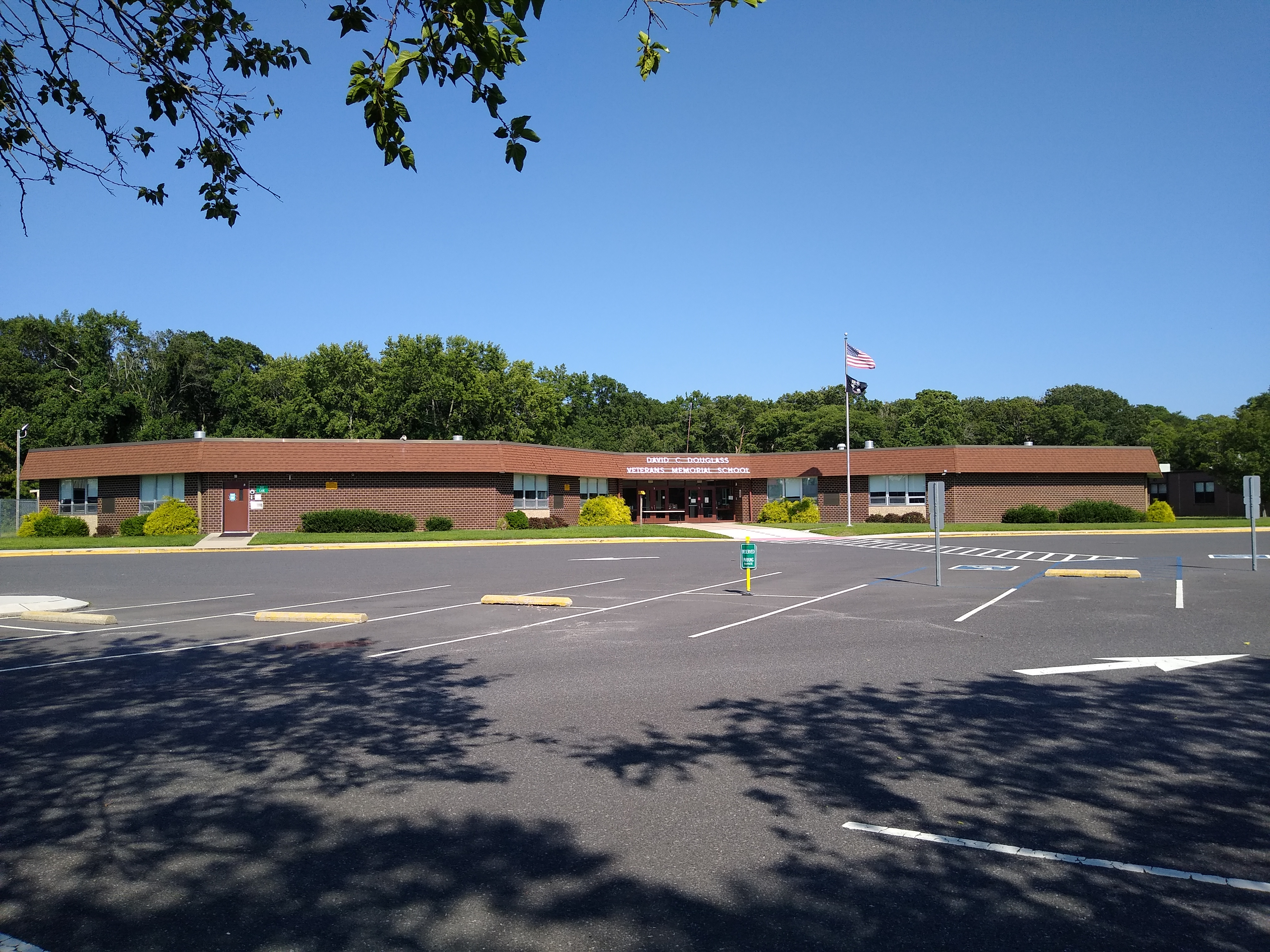
David C. Douglass Memorial School is in Villas

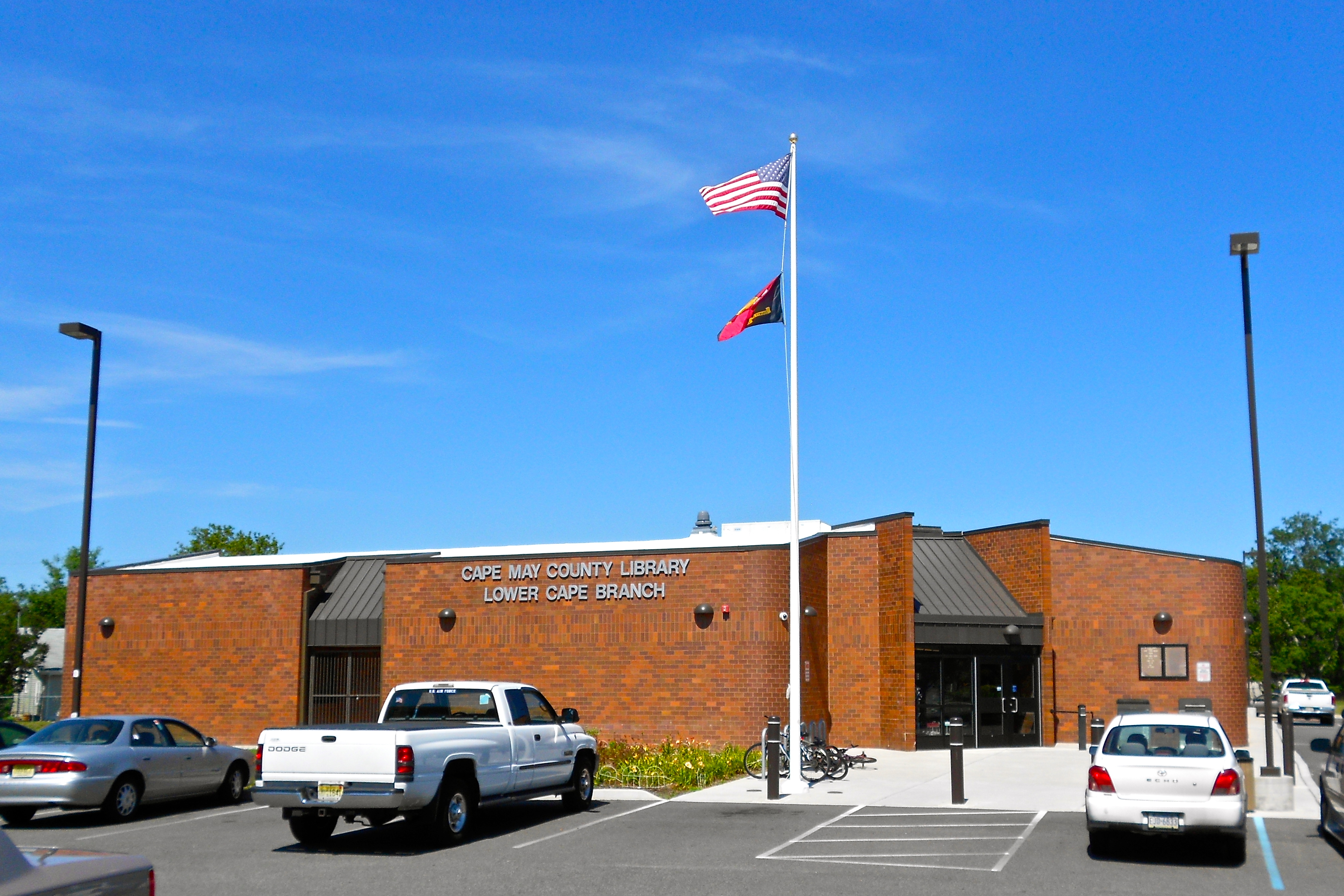
Lower Township Library

Villas is served by Lower Township School District for primary grades and Lower Cape May Regional School District for secondary grades.

One of the Lower Township elementary school facilities, David C. Douglass Memorial Elementary School (pre-Kindergarten and Kindergarten), is in Villas CDP. The other three elementary schools are in Cold Spring: Carl T. Mitnick (grades 1–2), Maud Abrams (grades 3–4), and Sandman Consolidated (grades 5–6). The LCMR schools (Richard Teitelman Middle and Lower Cape May Regional High School) are in the Erma area.

Students are also eligible to attend Cape May County Technical High School in Cape May Court House, which serves students from the entire county in its comprehensive and vocational programs, which are offered without charge to students who are county residents. Special needs students may be referred to Cape May County Special Services School District in the Cape May Court House area.

Wildwood Catholic Academy (PreK-12) in North Wildwood, of the Roman Catholic Diocese of Camden, is the closest Catholic school. Villas CDP had its own Catholic K-8 school, St. Raymond's School, until 2007, when it merged into Our Lady Star of the Sea School in Cape May. In 2010 that school merged into Cape Trinity Regional School (PreK – 8) in North Wildwood. That school in turn merged into Wildwood Catholic Academy in 2020.

Cape May County Library operates the Lower Township Library in Villas.

== Religion ==
St. John Neumann Catholic Parish, of the Roman Catholic Diocese of Camden has its primary worship site in Villas, at the former standalone church, St. Raymond Church. In 2008 the diocese announced that it would merge into St. John of God of North Cape May, and the merger occurred in 2010.

== Parks and recreation ==
Lower Township maintains the Lower Township Recreation Complex, the Clem Mulligan Sports Complex, Millman Community Center, and Rotary Park in Villas. Fishing Creek Schoolhouse is listed as a property of the recreation department.

Cape May County maintains the Lower Cape Senior Center in Villas.

== Notable people ==
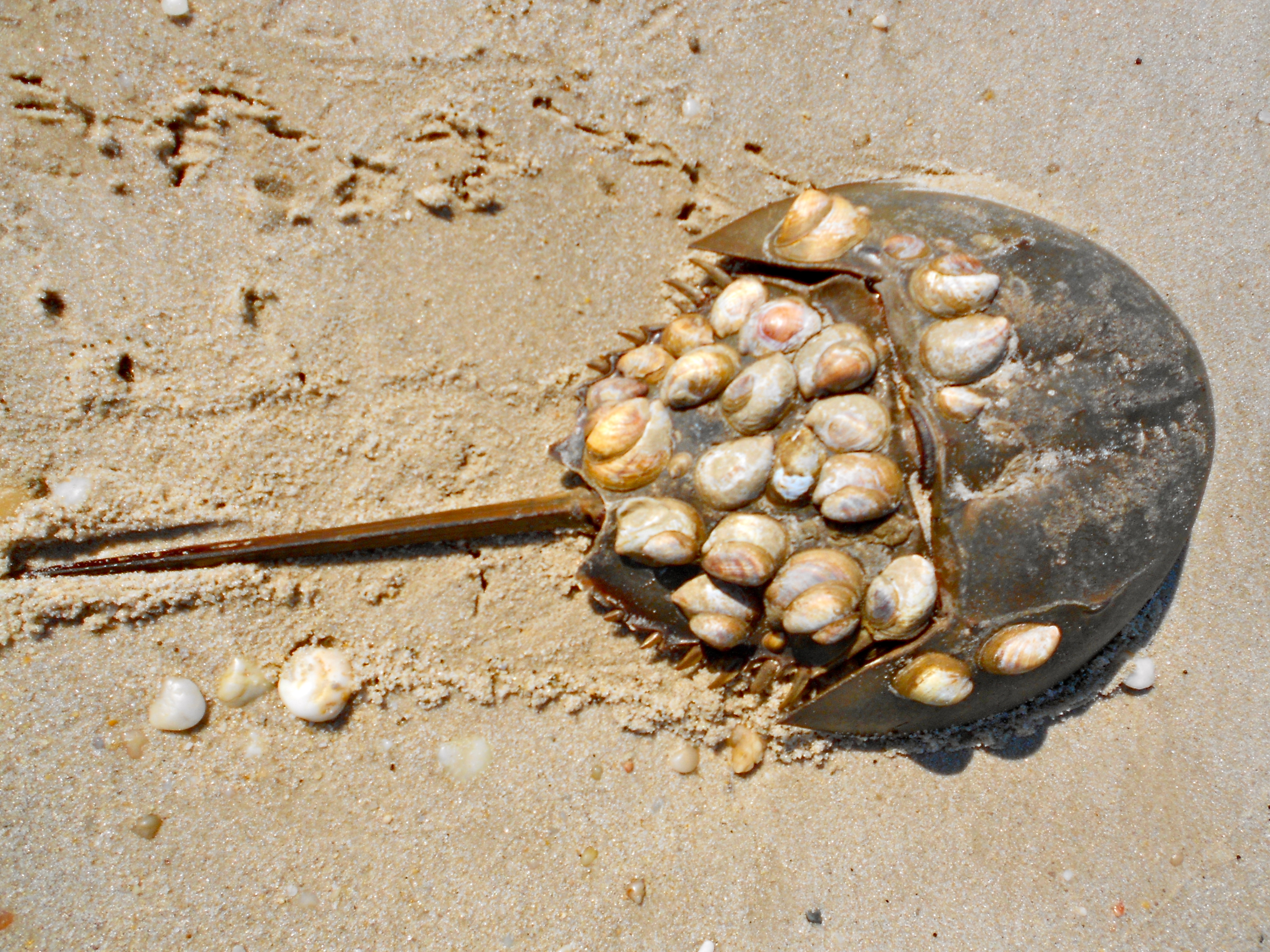
Atlantic horseshoe crab on the beach by Delaware Bay in Villas.

People who were born in, residents of, or otherwise closely associated with Villas include:

- Michael Linnington (born 1958), CEO of Wounded Warrior Project
- Steven Rappaport, performer with The Ran-Dells, which was a one-hit wonder with the song "Martian Hop".
