= Play party =

Play party can mean:

- Play party (United States), a type of traditional U.S. social event where people get together to sing and dance
- Play party (BDSM), a BDSM or kink social event in which BDSM and/or kinky activities take place

== See also ==
- Party and play
- Party game
