= Martian Hop =

- "Martian Hop" 45

Single by The Ran-Dells
- B-side: "Forgive Me Darling (I Have Lied)"
- Released: June 1963
- Studio: Bell Sound (New York City)
- Genre: Doo-wop, novelty, pop
- Length: 2:14
- Label: Chairman
- Songwriter: John Michael Spirt, Robert Lawrence Rappaport, Steve Millman Rappaport

The Ran-Dells singles chronology
"Martian Hop" (1963)	"Sound of the Sun" (1963)

"Martian Hop" is a song written by The Ran-Dells, and released in 1963. It has been described as a one-hit wonder novelty song and reached #27 on the black singles chart, #16 on the Billboard Hot 100, and number 2 in Canada. The song was later covered by artists as diverse as Rocky Sharpe and the Replays, Joanie Bartels and soul group The Newcomers. Versions in French included comedian Henri Salvador and the group Les Champions.

== Creation ==
The song is the product of the three band members joking around in John Spirt's living room at his residence in Wildwood, New Jersey. It tells of Martians throwing a dance party for "all the human race”, and "theorized Martians were probably great dancers." It is one of many songs recorded during the 1950s and 1960s that capitalized on space exploration and the possibility of threatening aliens. While Steve Rappaport worked on the song in the studio, Gerry Goffin heard it and recommended to Don Kirshner that it be picked up and released on the new label, Chairman. The master tape cost over $300 and "Martian Hop" became the third single Chairman released.

== Early electronic music ==
Though the Ran-Dells have been recognized for innovative and pioneering use of a sine wave generator (a first for the pop music genre), the musicians actually responsible for the sine wave tones heard in "Martian Hop" received no credit for the composition. The twelve-second introduction at the beginning of the song is an uncredited sample from the first 30 seconds of "Moon Maid" by Tom Dissevelt and Dick Raaymakers, a.k.a. Kid Baltan. It appeared on their experimental album, The Electrosoniks - Electronic Music in 1962, a year before "Martian Hop" was recorded.

== Chart positions ==
The Ran-Dells

Chart (1963)	Peak position
U.S. Billboard Hot 100	16
Canada CHUM	2
Chart (1974)	Peak position
Australia (Kent Music Report)	44

Rocky Sharpe and the Replays version

Chart (1980)	Peak position
UK Singles Chart (Official Chart Company)	55

== See also ==
- List of 1960s one-hit wonders in the United States
