= Murder of Jennifer Moore =

Criminal act in New York

- Location: New York City, U.S.
- Date: c. July 25, 2006; 20 years ago
- Attack type: Homicide
- Deaths: 1
- Victim: Jennifer Moore
- Perpetrators: Draymond Coleman; Krystal Riordan (accomplice)

Jennifer Moore (April 21, 1988 – July 25, 2006) was an 18-year-old American student from Harrington Park, New Jersey, who was abducted around July 25, 2006, from Manhattan, New York, and then raped and murdered.

== Background ==
Moore graduated from Saddle River Day School, located in Bergen County, in May 2006, where she had been captain of the girls' soccer team. Moore was scheduled to attend and study nursing at the University of Hartford.

Initially, Moore was reported as "missing". Her murder prompted a media comparison to John Jay College of Criminal Justice graduate student Imette St. Guillen, who had also been abducted, raped and killed five months earlier. Moore's murder, as well as St. Guillen's, focused public attention, and later bureaucratic scrutiny on New York City nightlife. It also brought to public attention the issues of teenage drinking and fake IDs to obtain access to nightclubs. Nightlife legislation was begun in other states following New York.

== Murder ==
During the night of her disappearance, Moore and a friend had driven into New York City for a night of clubbing and drinking. Moore was underage at the time. Moore's friend parked her vehicle on the street outside a nightclub named Guest House, located in Chelsea, on West 27th Street. Moore's friend later moved the car, but it was ticketed while the girls were inside the club and finally towed to the West 38th Street impound lot. When Moore and her friend went to get the vehicle at the impound lot, the attendants refused to surrender it. The friend collapsed, suffering an epileptic episode, and an ambulance was called. Moore had walked away unnoticed.

Moore's friend later awoke to find herself in an ambulance, on her way to St. Vincent's Hospital. The friend tried, in vain, to contact Moore on her cellphone. Witnesses had reported seeing Moore walking uptown alongside the West Side Highway.

Moore was reported to have made a frantic phone call to her boyfriend, saying, "There's a guy following me. He's offered me drugs. He won't leave me alone."

Moore's body was found in a trash bin in West New York, New Jersey. Moore's funeral was held at St. Gabriel's Roman Catholic Church in Saddle River, New Jersey. Five hundred friends and family members attended.

== Investigation and arrest ==
New York City police arrested a man suspected of her murder, Draymond Coleman, age 35, of New York City, who was later charged with the killing. Coleman had an extensive arrest record. After interrogating Coleman, New Jersey Police located Moore's body in a dumpster in West New York.

It was later reported that the crime had taken place in a nearby Weehawken, New Jersey motel named the Park Avenue Hotel. A New Jersey judge had later signed an arrest warrant on Thursday, July 27, 2006. Videotape recovered from the hotel showed Coleman leading Moore through the premises. Police surmise that Coleman beat, raped, and strangled Moore before stuffing her body into a duffel bag for disposal. It appeared that Coleman tried to remove his DNA evidence from her body by cutting Moore's fingernails and cleaning her body with alcohol.

Coleman's criminal history included two assaults for which he served community service, and a conviction for selling drugs for which he served about five years in prison. Coleman was released from prison in June 2002. He spent the next three years in-and-out of detention for parole violations. His last incarceration ended in January 2005. His parole board noted that Coleman failed to take advantage of the opportunities offered by the criminal justice system.

=== Cell phone investigation ===
It was reported that police found Coleman through the use of a cell phone. Cell phone usage investigation was also the technique applied in the Imette St. Guillen murder case in tracing the steps of alleged killer Darryl Littlejohn, who reportedly made cell phone calls near Fountain Avenue, the site where St. Guillen was later found.

=== Krystal Riordan ===
Police arrested Krystal Riordan, a 20-year-old New Jersey escort, for tampering with evidence and hindering prosecution. Riordan worked as a prostitute for pimp and boyfriend Coleman, and frequently used the same Weehawken motel in which the crime took place. According to police sources, Riordan tried to sell her services through Craigslist, offering a "$150 special" under the username "Lisa", on July 26, 2006 — a day after Moore's death. Hudson County Prosecutor Edward DeFazio concluded that Riordan had participated as Coleman's accomplice and charged her with felony murder.

=== Coleman's extradition to New Jersey ===
It was reported that Coleman was fighting extradition to New Jersey. A warrant was issued by New Jersey Governor Jon Corzine, and Manhattan prosecutors decided to drop a 1997 charge against him for allegedly having a small knife. Coleman later appeared in State Superior Court where he had to face Moore's mother and her sister. He glared at them as he was led out of the courtroom in shackles. The Superior Court Judge, Sheila Venable, imposed a $2 million cash bail against him. Coleman was extradited to New Jersey to face trial in October 2006.

== Blame ==
A Bergen Record article that was reproduced on a "Crime and Justice" blog discussed how Moore became the target of victim blaming. The article discussed Moore's murderer and the failure of bureaucracy, while in another Bergen Record article, Jeffrey Page commented on how blog websites discussed how Moore dressed, and related topics.

Some postings on blog sites and Internet message boards hint through some crazy logic that Moore was somehow culpable. You've heard this garbage before: They get drunk, they dress provocatively, so what do they expect? The more obscene version includes the words 'asking for it'.

Page then mentioned how another columnist, Michelle Malkin, who appeared on The O'Reilly Factor, seemed to agree with these observations. Page quoted Malkin in the same article as saying:

At some point these young women have to take responsibility for putting themselves in vulnerable positions. And this is an 18-year-old girl who has, you know, free will and a free mind. And if she's walking around by herself, bombed, you know, it could be very dangerous.

Page then went on to discuss alcohol and its effects on teenagers and their family members. By coincidence, Page had written a column before Moore's murder about other teenagers being shot to death in New Jersey and encouraged families to "Watch the kids carefully. This is a fearful time."

Other commentators such as Tucker Carlson and Keith Olbermann severely criticized Bill O'Reilly for suggesting that the young woman was herself responsible for her own rape and murder.

== Sentencing delay ==
In March 2010, Coleman pleaded guilty in front of Hudson County Superior Court Judge Kevin Callahan, in Jersey City, to the murder of Jennifer Moore. The plea terms require Coleman to serve 50 years in prison plus more time beyond that period.

Lawrence Auster wrote an online critique on the reasons for the delay of the trial of Draymond Coleman.

== Krystal Riordan's plea ==
In May 2010, Krystal Riordan, then 24 years old, pleaded guilty to her role in the kidnapping and murder of Moore and received a sentence of 30 years. Both Moore's parents and Riordan's adoptive parents were in the courtroom for the sentencing.

The Assistant Hudson County Prosecutor Michael D'Andrea petitioned Judge Callahan to impose the maximum sentence of 40 years on Riordan and to discount the testimony of a "rough childhood" as a mitigating factor, then he made this statement:

There is only one victim here, judge, make no mistake about it, her name is Jennifer Moore. She will never feel the sun on her face. She will never feel the warmth of love or a kind embrace. She's dead. She's dead because of what this woman did.

Superior Court Judge Kevin Callahan made this comment to Riordan:

You won't see anything but a roof over your head and bars in front of you through your 20s, your 30s and into your 40s; think about that; but you'll walk free one day, and Miss Moore never will.

At Riordan's Sentencing, Moore's mother, Candida, had a rather long prepared statement, which she read to Riordan before the sentencing. In her statement, Moore's mother mentions her views upon seeing the security camera footage in 2006, the mention of the violence done to her daughter and some of Riordan's own family history. Her statement was summed up thus:

Your honor, it is our belief that Ms. Riordan has given up her right to be part of society at this time. It is evident from her actions, or non-actions, that she should be considered dangerous. She aided in abusing the trust of a young, naive girl and allowed a horrific crime to take place in her presence. She accepted the brutality of her partner and worked with him to cover up their actions.

== Comparisons to other crime victims ==
=== Comparison to the murders of Imette St. Guillen and Chanel Petro-Nixon ===
On July 28, 2006, the Spanish language newspaper periodical El Diario, ran the front-page headline title Otra Imette, accompanied by Moore's high school photo, comparing her murder with John Jay College of Criminal Justice student Imette St. Guillen, who had been murdered on February 25, 2006, by one of the bouncers at The Falls bar. Her death was also related to nightlife in general. With Moore's death, some news and media sources such as the New York Post, started article series that focused on nightlife, bars, bouncers, underage drinking and fake I.D's in their newspaper and television stories.

As the year 2006 had been one in which a number of high-profile murders of young women students were covered in the media, there have been no revelations, however, to the case of even younger Chanel Petro-Nixon, who disappeared in broad daylight while walking in Brooklyn on a Sunday afternoon to apply for a job. This further murder prompted columnist Andrea Peyser to write an article titled "It's open season on young gals", linking together the murders of St. Guillen, Moore and Petro-Nixon:

It's open season on young girls. An 18-year-old was found murdered this week in Jersey, allegedly by a man who took her from Manhattan after a night of underage clubbing. In February, graduate student Imette St. Guillen was taken from a SoHo bar and killed, allegedly by the bouncer. But the case of Chanel Petro-Nixon stands out for three reasons: She went missing in broad daylight, blocks from her house – not at night, coming out of a bar.

An article published one year after Moore's death in the New York Post reported that felony assaults had dropped 13%; that every person seeking admittance to a club had to present an I.D. card which would be checked by handheld scanners and mentioned other areas of the city affected.

=== Comparison to Laura Garza ===
The disappearance of 25-year-old Laura Garza was initially compared, in the print edition of the New York Daily News, to Moore and St. Guillen. Garza disappeared after leaving a Chelsea club named Marquee on Tenth Avenue December 3, 2008. The remains of her body have since been found by police.

== New York City and other states' nightlife legislations ==
In September 2011, the NYPD Nightlife Association updated their Safety Manual Handbook "to include a section on counterterrorism, after several bars and clubs around the globe were targeted by terrorists". To further quote the article:

New York Nightlife Association partnered with the NYPD after the deaths of Imette St. Guillen and Jennifer Moore, who were killed in separate incidents after a night out in city clubs.

== See also ==
- List of solved missing person cases (2000s)
