= Fishing Creek Schoolhouse =

- U.S. National Register of Historic Places
- New Jersey Register of Historic Places
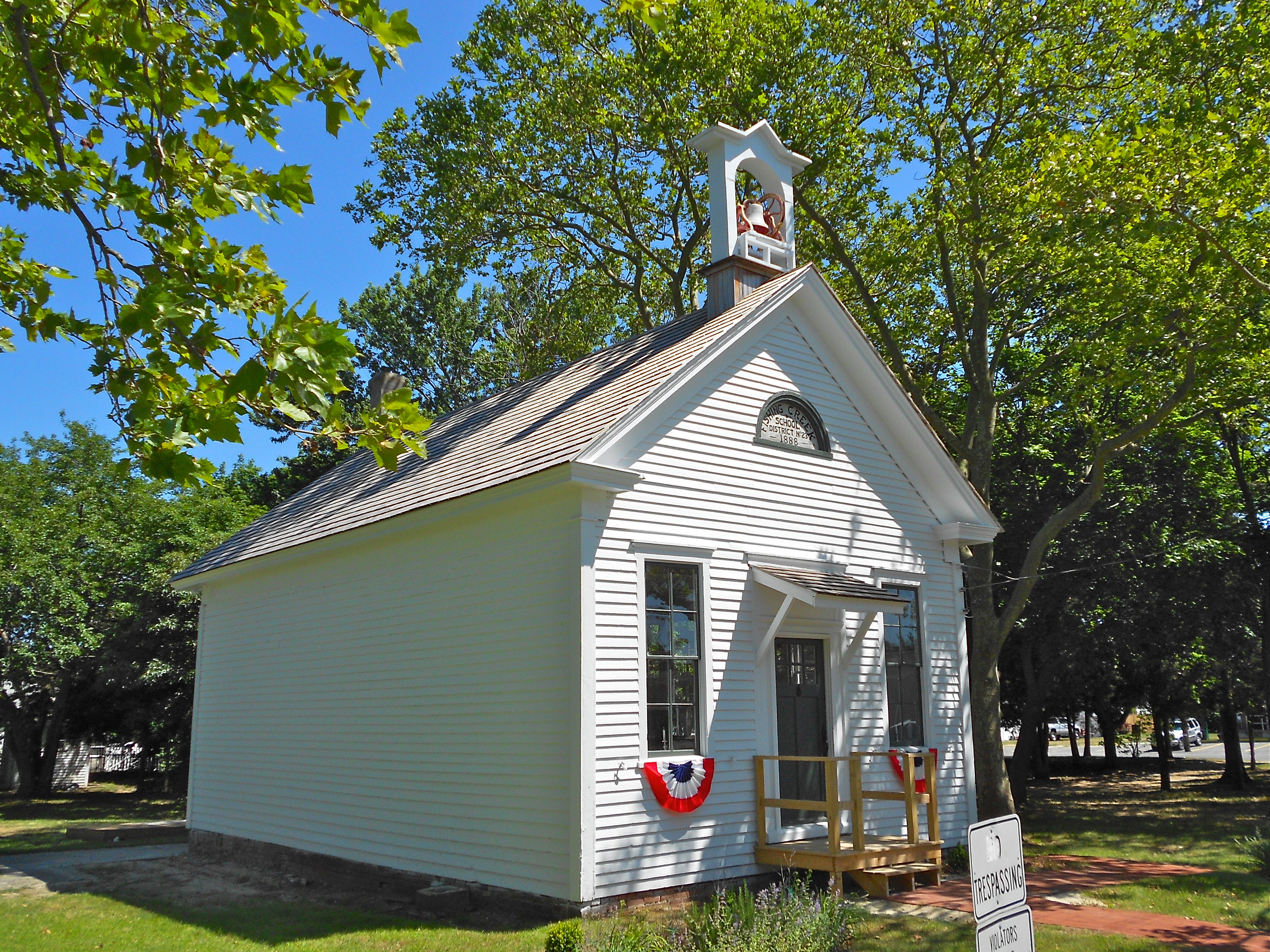

- Location within Cape May County, New Jersey Location within New Jersey Location within the United States
- Location: 2102 Bayshore Road, Villas, Lower Township, New Jersey
- Coordinates: 39°0′51″N 74°56′20″W
- Area: 1 acre (0.40 ha)
- Built: 1888
- NRHP reference No.: 80002478
- NJRHP No.: 1000

Significant dates
- Added to NRHP: March 6, 1980
- Designated NJRHP: October 9, 1979

Fishing Creek Schoolhouse (historically pronounced "Fishing Crik") is a historic school located in the Villas census-designated place, of Lower Township, Cape May County, New Jersey, United States. The schoolhouse was built in 1888 and added to the National Register of Historic Places on March 6, 1980.

The school is listed as a property of the Lower Township Recreation Department.

== History ==
The first school in the Fishing Creek area was built in the early 1800s on Fulling Mill Road, about a mile north of the current site. It was a log cabin that became so rundown that a local paper described it as "a disgrace to the neighborhood". It was used as a community center, supporting such activities as the Zobo Band, the Church Junior League, and neighborhood Saturday evening meetings. These activities continued after the new schoolhouse was built in 1888.

The new school was built on land donated by the Matthews family, with the basic structural form being adapted from plans for a church. Many of the builders of the one-room schoolhouse were veterans of the Civil War. The Fishing Creek School served as the only school in the area until the advent of motorized school buses. In 1921 some students were sent to the Cold Spring Academy by bus. After 1921 the school served about 40 students in grades 1-4 until it closed, about 1925. Students would walk from as far as two miles away to attend.

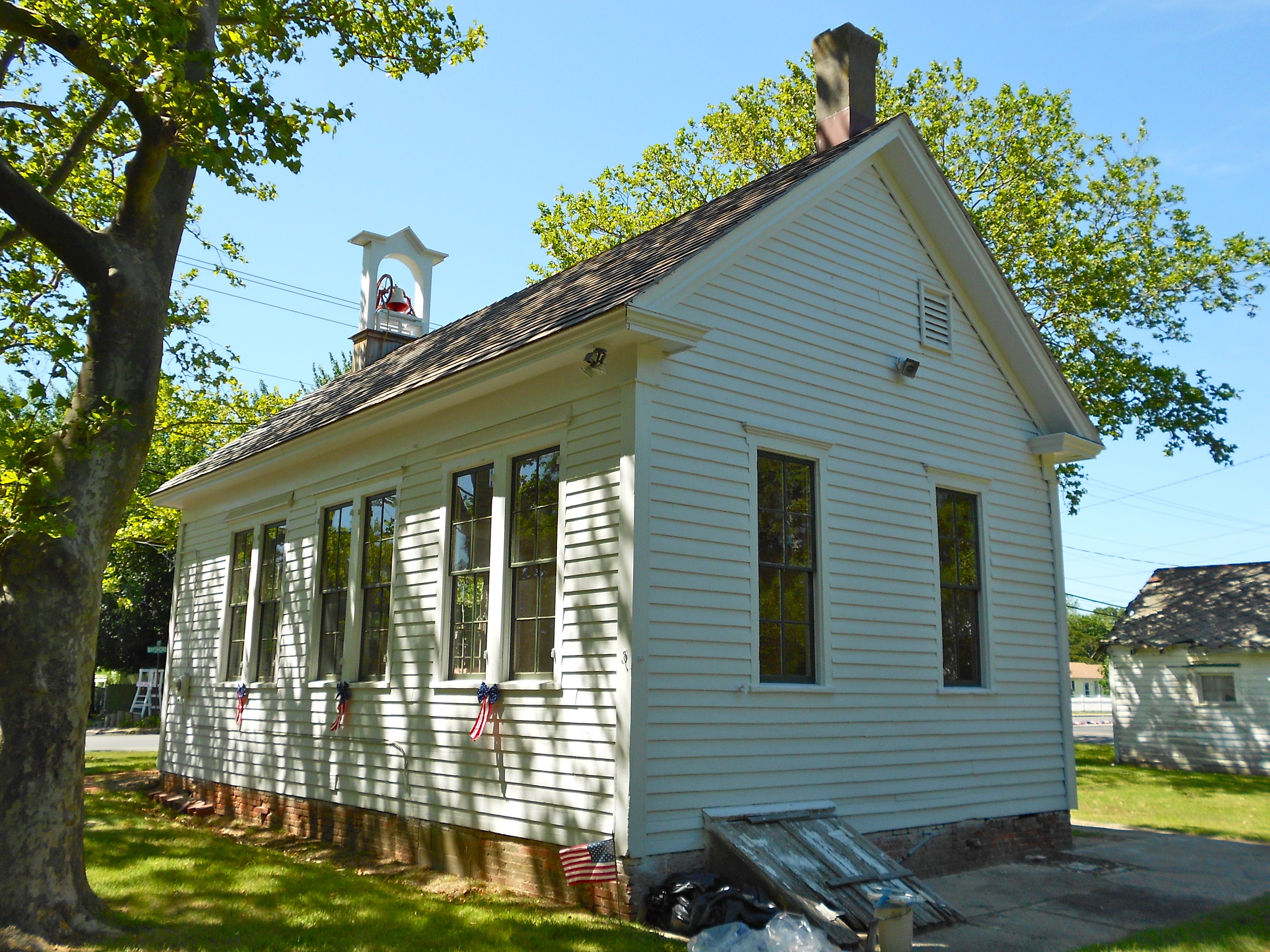
View from the southeast

In the 1920s, there were as many as eight one-room schoolhouses in the lower Cape May region, but with the introduction of school buses, the one-room schoolhouses became obsolete, and schools were consolidate into buildings with multiple classrooms.

In 1926, the Fishing Creek School was sold at public auction and subsequently purchased by the Leckey family as a summer home. The Leckey family sought to preserve the school, and it was listed on the National and State Historic Registers in 1980.

In 1998, members of the community began efforts to save the Fishing Creek School, and in 2002, the school, along with 1.3 acres, was purchased by the State Green Acres Program, and subsequently leased to Lower Township for 20 years. It is now being developed into a community center for recreational and educational uses. Mayor Mike Beck of Lower Township organized a non-profit organization, The Friends of the Fishing Creek School, to lead the effort to restore and maintain the site for the benefit of the community. In 2010 two old roofs were removed and a new cedar shake roof was installed, to match the original roof.

The Fishing Creek School is the only remaining one-room schoolhouse in Lower Township, New Jersey.

== See also ==
External videos
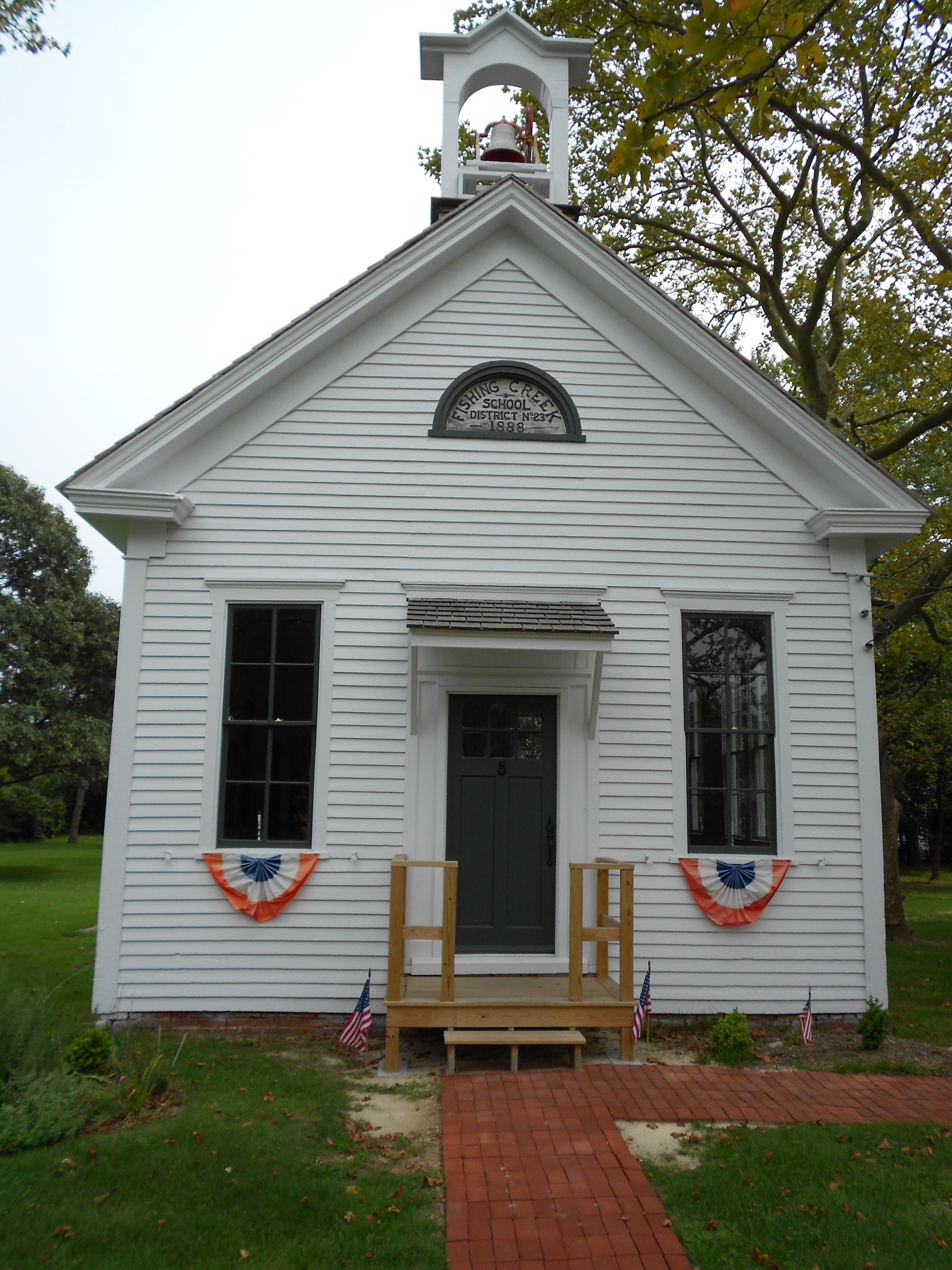
- Fishing Creek School, Cape May Film

- National Register of Historic Places listings in Cape May County, New Jersey
