= Murder of Imette St. Guillen =

Criminal act in New York

Imette St. Guillen
- St. Guillen in 2003
- Born: Imette Carmella St. Guillen; March 2, 1981; Boston, Massachusetts, USA
- Died: February 25, 2006 (aged 24); Brooklyn, New York City, USA
- Known for: Murder victim
- Height: 5 ft 2 in (1.57 m)
- Parent(s): Seimundo Guillen and Maureen St. Hillaire

Imette Carmella St. Guillen (March 2, 1981 – February 25, 2006) was an American graduate student who was raped and murdered in New York City. She was studying criminal justice at John Jay College of Criminal Justice in New York City. Her murder captured national attention; together with the later murder of Jennifer Moore, it was a catalyst for passage of legislation to require background checks of bouncers in bars and a security plan for nightclubs. Darryl Littlejohn, a bouncer, was convicted of St. Guillen's murder.

== Life and murder ==
Imette St. Guillen was born in Boston, Massachusetts, to Seimundo Guillen and Maureen St. Hilaire. Her surname–and that of her elder sister– was a combination of their parents' surnames. Their mother was French Canadian. Their father, Seimundo Guillen, a Venezuelan immigrant, died of AIDS when Imette was 9 years old. Her widowed mother later remarried.

St. Guillen graduated from Boston Latin School in 1999 and moved to Washington, D.C. to attend George Washington University. Like her father, St. Guillen studied criminal justice. She graduated magna cum laude in 2003 and enrolled at John Jay College of Criminal Justice to pursue a master's degree. Although originally intending to study forensic psychology, St. Guillen changed her major to criminal justice. Ranked in the top 5% of her class, she was scheduled to graduate in May 2006.

After celebrating her upcoming birthday with her mother and sister in Florida, St. Guillen took a plane back to New York. On February 24, 2006, St. Guillen met with her best friend Claire Higgins to continue celebrating her birthday, a few days away. Out at a nightclub around 3:30 a.m. on February 25, the two women argued over whether to go home. Higgins left; later, in a 3:50 a.m. phone call, St. Guillen assured Higgins that she would soon be leaving for home. She was last seen at 4:00 a.m at a bar named The Falls.

Seventeen hours after St. Guillen spoke with her friend, police in Brooklyn received an anonymous phone call alerting them to a dead woman's body on Fountain Avenue in Spring Creek Park. They soon identified it as St. Guillen. Her body was nude, wrapped in a comforter. Her broken fingernails showed she fought against her attacker. Her hands and feet were tied, a sock had been shoved down her throat, and her head was wrapped in packing tape. Some of her hair had been cut off. An autopsy revealed that she had been beaten and sexually assaulted before being asphyxiated. According to forensic psychologist Dr. Stephanie Stolinsky, the killer "tried to dehumanize her completely. ... Whenever you hide someone's face, it means that you don't want to see them as a human being. You want to pretend that they're just an object".

The murder case of Imette St. Guillen was handled by the Special Victims Squad and Brooklyn North Homicide Squad of the NYPD.

Fountain Avenue in Spring Creek Park, where the body of Imette St. Guillen was found after an anonymous phone call from the Lindenwood Diner to NYPD. This photograph was taken facing east, toward the Belt Parkway. A memorial, created by various sympathizers and neighborhood well-wishers, is shown on the left.

== Arrest ==
The Falls South side door, from which Littlejohn allegedly led St. Guillen outside to his van, photographed in 2006

Darryl Littlejohn, one of two bouncers at The Falls where St. Guillen was seen the night she was murdered, was charged with first-degree murder, kidnapping, and unlawful imprisonment. DNA that was proven to be Littlejohn's, most likely caused from a nosebleed, was found in blood on the plastic ties used to bind St. Guillen's hands. Littlejohn was asked to escort St. Guillen out of The Falls just before closing, and was later seen talking to the young woman in front of the bar. His basement apartment in Queens and vehicles were searched by police and crime scene investigators. Carpet fibers found in Littlejohn's home were a match to fibers discovered on the adhesive tape wrapping St. Guillen's face. Additional evidence that Littlejohn was in the area at the time, date, and place where St. Guillen was killed and dumped was found using cell phone tower records. These "indicated movement from his home to near the spot in Brooklyn where Ms. St. Guillen's body was found."

Due to the nature of St. Guillen's murder and other high-profile crimes, The Village Voice suggested that the Internal Affairs Bureau (IAB) was devoting more of its time to tracing the cellular phones of detectives. The article discussed efforts to uncover leaks to the media in these cases. A source that communicated with The Village Voice said that police in St. Guillen's murder case had received "punitive 'letters of instruction' in their files and were docked days of pay."

Littlejohn, an ex-convict, had spent more than 12 years in prison for drug possession and robbery charges. He was on parole at the time of his employment at The Falls and, by working late hours at the bar, was violating the curfew of his parole agreement. He was initially held by authorities because of the parole violation, and was later charged with one count of first-degree murder and two counts of second-degree murder for the death of St. Guillen. During that time, Littlejohn was tried and convicted in the attempted abduction of a Queens woman on October 19, 2005; this abduction attempt was later linked to St. Guillen's case, as the woman called police after seeing the suspected van on TV news reports.

Littlejohn's initial defense attorney was Kevin O'Donnell, but he was dismissed after Littlejohn complained about his work. Littlejohn's second lawyer, Joyce David, was known for her book What You Should Know If You're Accused of a Crime. She filed a 36-page legal brief on her defendant's behalf alleging a "wide-ranging conspiracy" related to Littlejohn and the St. Guillen murder.

According to prosecutors, Littlejohn started his criminal career at age 12, first stealing a 70-year-old woman's purse with the help of a friend. Prosecutors in the 2005 abduction sought court permission to discuss Littlejohn's crimes, and prosecutor Frank DeGaetano said that the crimes "fairly reflect his character." Littlejohn's lawyer wanted discussion of his past banned from the trial.

== License for The Falls bar ==
During the investigation, there were revelations that The Falls bar manager, Daniel Dorrian, had allegedly lied about elements of St. Guillen's disappearance and murder. Jeff Ragsdale, a New York City writer, organized a group of people through Craigslist to start a demonstration in front of The Falls bar. The demonstrations lasted a few months, and around June 2006 The Falls bar lost its liquor license. The Pioneer bar was associated with the disappearance of St. Guillen that night, but was not related to her murder. Nevertheless, the bar suffered negative publicity, and news reports showed images of its facade in coverage of the murder, leading the bar to change its name to the R Bar.

== Littlejohn's pre-trial and trial in previous abduction ==
Littlejohn went on trial in 2007 for the 2005 abduction, which was held before the murder trial for St. Guillen. Observers were concerned that this suggested that St. Guillen's murder case was not strong enough. Prosecution, however, stated that they were prepared to proceed with the murder trial.

In January 2009, Littlejohn was convicted of kidnapping a college student, Shanai Woodard, in October 2005. The victim testified that he had approached her while dressed as a police officer, handcuffed her, and forced her into a vehicle. She escaped. Littlejohn was sentenced to 25 years-to-life in prison.

== Trial ==
Pre-trial hearings began on September 11, 2007. Littlejohn's defense attorney Joyce David challenged the autopsy findings as well as the search warrants giving police the authority to search Littlejohn's van, his apartment, and to investigate his cell phone records.

Opening arguments were given on May 11, 2009. Prosecution headed by Kenneth Taub laid out the case that Littlejohn was a sex fiend, with Taub stating that "He [Littlejohn] did the same thing to two other women three months before" and "Until this case, he got away with it." They briefly described the circumstantial evidence against Littlejohn. Littlejohn wore glasses in the courtroom. Some defense lawyers have described this as the "nerd defense, which is a tactic used to make felons and other criminals appear less menacing to the jury during a trial."

The defense was headed by Joyce David, who said that the case was a "racially charged frame-up by police eager to close a blockbuster case", that "He's a black man with a long criminal record" and "Who's going to care about him?" David pointed her finger at bartender Daniel Dorrian of The Falls bar and said that "Darryl Littlejohn is being framed to protect Danny Dorrian".

=== Prosecution's case ===
Claire Higgins, St. Guillen's best friend, was among the first to take the witness stand. She described the time she had shared with St. Guillen on the night of her disappearance. Daniel Dorrian, manager of the bar where St. Guillen was last seen, indicated during the trial that Littlejohn and St. Guillen had "a screaming match" that night. According to the Daily News, "Dorrian insisted he didn't lie when he initially stonewalled cops about St. Guillen's kidnapping and murder." However, he later admitted telling police that he did not remember St. Guillen being in The Falls bar, having attributed his initial statements to a fear of backlash against his bar. Defense lawyers suggested that Dorrian might have been the real killer and that St. Guillen might have returned to The Falls bar and "hooked up with Dorrian", though NYPD never investigated him as a possible suspect.

Littlejohn's ex-girlfriend, Sandra Smith, testified on May 14, the fourth day of the trial, testifying that after St. Guillen's death, he asked her to lie about using her Chrysler Sebring. Nicholas Petraco, a retired NYPD forensics evidence expert, testified about the presence of fibers from two coats and a jacket at Littlejohn's home in his van, on tape, and on a quilt, though he indicated that fiber analysis is not as good as DNA evidence. A representative of the medical examiner's office testified that Littlejohn's DNA was found on a snow brush found alongside St. Guillen's body, while Littlejohn's mother's hairs were on the quilt. Hairs were also identified as coming from eight other people. Medical examiner Ewelina Bajda said that traces of Littlejohn's blood were found in the locking mechanism of one of the zip-ties found in the Windstar used to bind St. Guillen.

Prosecutors called several witnesses to testify to previous cases in which Littlejohn was alleged to have abducted young women. Woodard, the victim in the 2005 attack, testified about her kidnapping attempt, and the district attorney who prosecuted him testified about the evidence that had led to his conviction, though Justice Gerges warned jurors should not take Woodard's testimony as proof of Littlejohn's "propensity" to commit such crimes. Prosecutors later called a Japanese woman, also a student, who had been raped four months before St. Guillen's death in a manner similar to Woodard's case. David, who objected to both Woodard's and the Japanese woman's testimonies, verbally attacked the second victim's inability to identify Littlejohn in a lineup. While Littlejohn had not been charged in the Japanese student's attack, prosecutors insisted there was "compelling proof" that he was her attacker. Prosecution rested its case on May 28.

=== Defense ===
The defense continued to suggest that the DNA-testing of evidence that the city-hired firm, Bode Technology, may have been contaminated in order to frame Littlejohn and to clear bar manager Danny Dorrian. The prosecution criticized the defense's argument that police framed Littlejohn. David in reply said the evidence may suggest her client dumped the body, but it did not prove that Littlejohn killed her. After questioning two detectives about the 25-hour search for evidence in Littlejohn's residence, concluding that none of the more than 50 items confiscated was linked to St. Guillen, and DNA testing had failed to yield a match, the defense rested its case.

=== Verdict ===
The jury of six men and six women took less than seven hours to convict Littlejohn of murdering Imette St. Guillen and found him guilty of first degree murder. Before the jury returned its verdict, David said to CNN that she believed in the innocence of her client. She repeated that Littlejohn was framed and another man was a likely suspect. Afterward, David said: "We're going to appeal. We're disappointed. I'm hoping this gives the family of the victim some closure. But I think that the wrong man was convicted."

=== Sentencing ===
Speaking to St. Guillen's relatives, Judge Abraham G. Gerges said, "I hope that the conclusion of these proceedings today will provide you with some small measure of solace." Judge Gerges directed comments to and about Littlejohn, calling him an unrepentant "predator" who should never taste freedom again. He sentenced him to life without parole.< The Judge also paid tribute to St. Guillen, describing her as a 'promising woman who never deserved to die' saying, "If there were truly justice in this world, I would have the power to bring her back to you," addressing Maureen and Alejandra, who cried in the courtroom. He said, "To my great sorrow, that is not possible."

Littlejohn is to serve his sentence consecutively with his previous 25-year-to-life term for kidnapping a Queens woman. David indicated after the sentencing that she would file a notice of appeal and indicated that Littlejohn remained silent. She maintained that he was framed to protect Dorrian.

== Civil lawsuits ==
In 2009 St. Guillen's family settled a confidential suit they brought against The Falls bar in 2007.

In early 2008, St. Guillen's mother brought a civil action against the federal government for US$200 million for their failure to keep track of Littlejohn under his parole. The suit names the Department of Justice, and the U.S. Probation and Pretrial Services Program as defendants. The suit was dismissed in May 2010 by Court of Claims Judge Faviola A. Soto, quoting an NYS Appeals decision that reaffirmed the standard that, "an agency of government is not liable for the negligent performance of a governmental function unless there existed 'a special duty to the injured person, in contrast to a general duty owed to the public.'" In March 2011, the St. Guillen family settled with the Federal government for $130,000. Tracking software for post-release offenders was later named after St. Guillen.

== Legacy ==
=== Legislation ===
According to New York's NightLife Association, after St. Guillen's death, crime rates around bars and clubs in New York City had decreased. Her death was one of several high-profile incidents of women murdered after leaving a nightclub. The combined media scrutiny resulted in new and modified laws governing nightclub operations, including their screening of personnel.

Soon after authorities realized that a bouncer may have been the perpetrator, nightclub owners and local politicians met to discuss ways to improve nightlife safety. In February 2007, New York City enacted a law requiring enhanced security and bouncer vetting. New York City club owners also agreed to voluntary guidelines which encourage the use of scanning machines to record the identification of their patrons and also encourage screening patrons for weapons. The guidelines provide for more care in dealing with intoxicated female patrons who are alone. The following month, Boston enacted a similar law, and Boston Mayor Thomas Menino signed an executive order authorizing the cancellation of liquor licenses granted to anyone found to have hired a violent felon.

A joint fundraising effort resulted in establishing the Imette St. Guillen Scholarship for second-year students at the John Jay College of Criminal Justice. Another scholarship in her name was endowed at Boston Latin School.

=== Representation in other media ===
- The title of the 2007 song "Pioneer to the Falls" by the American rock band Interpol references the last locations St. Guillen was seen alive.
- The murder was fictionalized in the novels Killer Heat by Linda Fairstein and Angel's Tip by Alafair Burke.
- St. Guillen's murder is discussed in the Jodi Picoult novel House Rules.
- St. Guillen is memorialized by Periel Aschenbrand in "In Memory of Imette", an article in A Memory, A Monologue, A Rant, and A Prayer. This collection of writings edited by Eve Ensler, author of The Vagina Monologues, is read as part of annual V-Day performances that raise funds to stop violence worldwide against women and girls.
- The case is featured on HLN's Forensic Files II in an episode titled "Blanket Denial."
- The case is featured in a 2019 episode of Homicide: Hours to Kill named "Last Call"
- The case is featured in a 2021 episode of A Time to Kill named "The Sable-Eyed Beauty" on Investigation Discovery.

== See also ==
- Murder of Romona Moore
- Nightlife legislation of the United States
