= Dancing ban =

Prohibitions against dancing

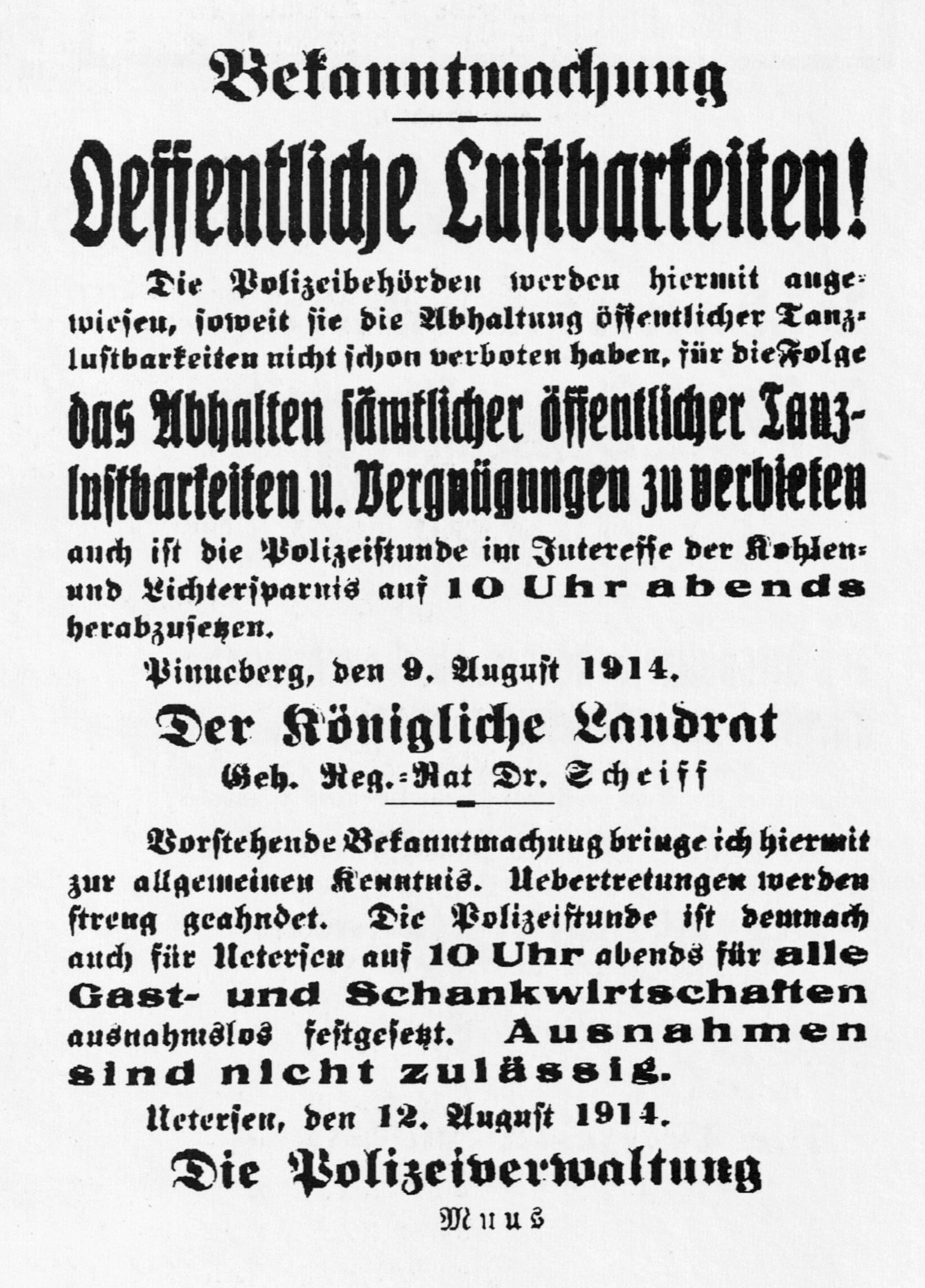
German Public announcement banning dance and public entertainment events in 1914

Dancing bans are legal or religious prohibitions against dancing, which have been applied at various times in various jurisdictions around the world. This article deals with general bans on recreational and artistic dancing, as opposed to bans on erotic forms of dancing such as lap dancing and topless dancing, which have been more common.

== Legal bans ==
Tanzverbot is the German term for "dancing ban". In Germany and Switzerland, dancing on some holidays is banned by most state or canton governments. These occasions are certain Christian and secular holidays aimed at mourning or contemplation, such as Good Friday, All Saints' Day (from its association with All Souls' Day practices) or memorial days like Volkstrauertag. The German and Swiss dancing bans prohibit public parties, but not dancing in one's private residence.

Until 1999, an ordinance in Pound, Virginia required that dance hall permits not be granted "to anyone who is not a proper person, nor to a person who is not a person of good moral character". After community opposition to granting him a permit, a lawsuit by William Elam, owner of the Golden Pine restaurant, resulted in the ordinance being struck down as unconstitutionally vague and infringing on free expression protected by the First Amendment to the United States Constitution. A replacement ordinance drafted more narrowly prompted a 2001 lawsuit from Elam, though the restaurant later went out of business after revocation of its alcohol license.

Since 1926, the New York City Cabaret Law prohibited dancing in all spaces open to the public that sold food and/or drink with the exception of those who obtain a cabaret license. This law was still enforced until it was repealed in 2017.

Between 1985 and 2002, a Seattle, Washington law called the Teen Dance Ordinance enacted strict legal requirements for those wishing to have dancing by youth under the age of 21, effectively banning events that would feature young people dancing.

=== Historic bans ===
From the 1830s to 1950s, play parties became popular in the United States of America as a means to circumvent restrictions on dancing.

The events of the movie Footloose (1984) were inspired by a dancing ban in the heavily Southern Baptist town of Elmore City, Oklahoma, which lasted until 1980.

Finland banned dancing in December 1939 following the outbreak of Winter War, with the ban lasting until the signing of the Moscow Armistice in 1944 that ended Finnish participation in World War II. Dancing in restaurants continued to be banned until 1948. Finnish people were organising secret dances that in turn were raided by the police, with at least 2 people dying during the raids.

=== COVID-19 public health measures ===
During the COVID-19 pandemic, the Australian jurisdictions prohibited, among other things, dancing as part of a suite of public health measures designed to prevent close contact between potential spreaders of the virus.

== Religious bans ==
=== Christianity ===
A few Christian groups believe that dancing is either inherently sinful or that certain forms of dancing could lead to sinful thoughts or activities, and thus proscribe it either in general or during religious services, particularly in the Anabaptist (chiefly Conservative Anabaptist and Old Order Anabaptist denominations) and Methodist (chiefly denominations belonging to the conservative holiness movement) traditions.

The Church of the Nazarene, a Methodist denomination originating in the Holiness Movement, recommends against "All forms of dancing that detract from spiritual growth and break down proper moral inhibitions and reserve."

A 19th-century Catholic theologian similarly teaches:

There are balls which are gravely licentious, either on account of immodest dances or of the costumes and dresses introduced at them. In these no one should take part. Even modest dances are rarely without danger, and a Christian should not frequent them from choice and of his own free will.

Many Christian churches determine doctrine locally and may be non-denominational, and these vary on their stances on social dancing.

In contrast, some strains of Charismatic Christianity practice rituals in which the Holy Spirit is believed to cause spontaneous dancing, among other behaviors.

It is a common misconception that Mormonism has banned dancing, when in fact it has advocated dance and participated in recreational dancing since it was organized in 1830. Founder Joseph Smith hosted dances in his home, and dancing continues as an integral part of youth and adult activities in the Church. Currently and in the past leaders in the largest denomination of Mormonism have looked down on dancing that includes any full-body contact, is suggestive of any sexual behavior, and/or has same-sex romantic overtones.

=== Islam ===
In Islam, extreme Salafists and Wahhabis consider dancing in general to be haram (forbidden). Conservative Islamic and Orthodox Jewish traditions prohibit contact between men and women in public (especially those not married to each other), and thus in these societies men and women either dance separately or not at all.

In contrast, Sufism encourages dancing, for example Sufi whirling and dancing to celebrate Mela Chiraghan. This has resulted in conflict in areas influenced by the Taliban.

== See also ==
- Businesses Affecting Public Morals Regulation Act, which restricted dancing in Japan
- New York City Cabaret (No Dancing) Law
- The Brass Rail (Toronto) – subject to lap dance ban, since overturned
