= Nightlife legislation in New York City =

Nightlife legislation in New York City can refer to:

- New York City Cabaret Card (1920-1967)
- New York City Cabaret Law (1926-2017)
- 2006 nightlife legislation in New York City (2006-present)
