= Murder of Romona Moore =

2003 homicide in Brooklyn, New York

Romona Moore (October 8, 1981 – c. April 27, 2003) was a 21-year-old Hunter College honors student and immigrant from Guyana who disappeared on April 24, 2003, in Brooklyn, New York. Two months later, her body was discovered outside an abandoned house to which an anonymous caller had directed her mother. Two male suspects were arrested and convicted in 2006 of having kidnapped, raped, tortured, and murdered Moore. Moore had been living at home with her parents and relatives before she was kidnapped.

The two murderers were sentenced to life in prison without parole for the murder and other charges related to Moore, with an additional 22 years for their escape attempt in January 2006 during the trial. In a separate trial during this period, the two suspects were also convicted of having abducted and raped a 15-year-old girl in 2003 soon after Moore's murder. The girl had escaped from them and gone to police. Her report contributed to their apprehension in the Moore case.

In 2008, Moore's mother Ellie Carmichael filed a suit in federal district court against the New York Police Department (NYPD), charging its officials with racial bias in how they handled cases of missing persons; the suit was accepted for trial. Carmichael contrasted the NYPD's treatment of her daughter's case with that of Imette St. Guillen, a white graduate student from the Upper West Side who disappeared around the same time (having fallen victim to a similar crime, St. Guillen was found raped, tortured and murdered shortly after her disappearance was reported). In August 2014, the federal judge dismissed the case, saying there was no evidence of systemic racial bias within the department on this issue.

== Background ==
Romona Moore was born in Guyana, and immigrated with her parents to New York City, where they settled in the East Flatbush section of Brooklyn. Relatives from Guyana also lived there. After attending local schools, Moore entered Hunter College. A responsible high achiever, in 2003 she was a third-year psychology honors student.

== Disappearance and murder ==
Moore was last seen by her family when she left home on April 24, 2003, at approximately 7:30 p.m. to meet a friend. She left the friend around 9:00 p.m., saying she was going to eat at a Burger King restaurant at Church and Remsen avenues. Moore apparently never reached the restaurant, and was not seen again by family or friends. When Moore's mother reported her missing the next day, the police said that perhaps the girl was with friends, declining to open the case despite the mother's protests about knowing her daughter's habits. The family posted their own photos and fliers in the neighborhood, hoping to gain information about Romona's disappearance. The police did not open a case on the missing young woman until April 28. In addition to their downplaying family concern when the student disappeared, the initial police reports about her murder mistakenly spelled Moore's first name as "Ramona" rather than the correctly spelled "Romona."

Around the same time as Moore's disappearance, police in Manhattan were publicizing their investigation of the disappearance of Svetlana Aronov, a rare book dealer reported missing by her husband. They held a press conference and displayed a large photo of the missing woman to make the public aware. Aronov's body was found drowned in the East River a few months later.

Several days after Moore's disappearance, a 15-year-old girl in Brooklyn reported to police that she had been abducted by two men and taken to an empty house where she was raped by them. She escaped and contacted authorities.

Around two months after Moore disappeared, her mother Ellie Carmichael received an anonymous phone call, telling her to go to an address on Kings Highway. The police have not identified the caller. Carmichael contacted the police and officers from the 67th Precinct and Emergency Service Units searched the premises of an abandoned, burned house. They discovered Moore's nude body outside, wrapped in a blanket. Police sources said that the young woman had been beaten severely about her head and chest. The basement had been flooded in an apparent attempt to destroy forensic evidence.

== Trial and details ==
Two male suspects were arrested in the Moore case, in part aided by the report of the 15-year-old girl they had sexually attacked. In 2004 the Brooklyn DA was reported to be seeking the death penalty against the two defendants, who were indicted on five counts of first degree murder, among other charges, for allegedly kidnapping, raping and murdering Romona Moore. However, the death penalty was dropped as an option after the People v. LaValle ruling in 2004. The two men also faced separate charges for their attack on the 15-year-old.

The details of Moore's kidnapping, captivity, and murder were recounted in the prosecutor's opening statement at the trial, which started on January 18, 2006:

Prosecutor Anna-Sigga Nicolazzi said two thugs terrorized Ramona Moore for days in a Brooklyn basement in April 2003, repeatedly raping her and attacking her with a knife, a saw, a hammer and a barbell. Defendants Troy Hendrix, 22, and Kayson Pearson, 23, are also charged with kidnapping and raping a 15-year-old girl days after they allegedly killed Moore. "Romona Moore's injuries are indescribable,' said Nicolazzi. "The horror she endured, the torture she endured will become clear."

Additional details were revealed in testimony about evidence.

=== Witness testimony ===
Romando Jack, a friend of Hendrix and Pearson, testified to seeing Moore chained and held as a captive by Pearson and Hendrix in the basement of a house but at the time did not report this to the police; he went to a baby shower and later returned home to Maryland. Jack told his fiancée and her uncle about the young woman being abused and held captive. He said during the trial that he thought his uncle may have called the police.

=== Escape attempt and mistrial ===
The courtroom was thrown into chaos on January 19, 2006, when defendant Pearson stabbed his attorney on his way out of the courtroom. Defendant Hendrix jumped a barricade and tried to take a gun from one of the bailiffs, in order to make their escape. Both men were subdued by officers. The two men were charged with "assault, resisting arrest and attempted escape."

The judge declared a mistrial due to Pearson's attack on his lawyer in the courtroom. New charges were brought against the two defendants for their attack, and a new trial was quickly scheduled.

== Main trial ==
A second kidnapping and murder trial was begun.

On March 23, 2006, the district attorney announced the jury conviction of Hendrix and Pearson on charges of kidnapping, rape, torture and first-degree murder of Romona Moore, 21. They were reputedly members of the Bloods gang.

After the verdict was announced, Moore's mother Ellie Carmichael spoke to the press in front of TV cameras; she said she had received justice inside the courtroom if not outside, and strongly criticized press and police for their conduct since her daughter's disappearance and murder. She said, "All I got was nothing but disrespect from the media and the police."

=== Sentencing ===
On April 11, 2006, Pearson and Hendrix were both sentenced to life in prison without the possibility of parole. The two men received an additional 22 years for their attacks in the court while seeking escape.

== Lawsuit against NYPD ==
As Moore's family awaited sentencing of the convicted defendants, their daughter's case was superseded by media attention related to the announcement of a grand jury indictment across the street in another courtroom in the abduction and murder of Imette St. Guillen, a graduate student at John Jay College of Criminal Justice who had lived on the Upper West Side. She had also been tortured and raped before her death.

Moore's family felt that in 2003, when their daughter disappeared, neither the police nor the press took her case seriously. They did not search as hard for her as for Svetlana Aronov, a white woman who worked as a rare art book dealer and who had disappeared in Manhattan at about the same time, nor did they have a press conference to call attention to the honor student's disappearance. The Moore relatives initially had posted fliers in their neighborhood when the police declined to open an investigation, saying that sometimes young people took off for a few days. It turned out that Moore was still alive and subject to torture when the police closed her case. The police have said that circumstances in the Moore and Aronov cases were different.

Following the conclusion of the trial of the murderers of her daughter, on April 3, 2008, Moore's mother Elle Carmichael filed a federal lawsuit against the NYPD, alleging that they did not take sufficient action in cases of missing black women and girls. The historic racial-bias lawsuit was cleared for trial by Brooklyn Federal District Judge Nina Gershon.

Carmichael is claiming that NYPD "used a double standard" by not mounting a vigorous search for Moore while "aggressively pursuing the disappearance of white women." The police at the 67th Precinct had rejected Carmichael's initial request to search for her daughter by saying that "she was probably off with a boyfriend." Carmichael contrasted the NYPD's actions in failing to investigate the disappearance of her daughter with their pursuit of evidence in the case of Svetlana Aronov, a white woman. City Attorney Robyn Pullio indicated that she was looking forward to a hearing in this case so that all facts could be heard.

In August 2014, Federal District Judge Nina Gershon dismissed Carmichael's bias case, ruling that there was no evidence to show there was "a widespread, racially-motivated practice within the NYPD of delays in listing minorities missing or investigating the circumstances." She acknowledged there could be differences among specific cases, but said systemic bias was not shown.

== Representation in the media ==
On October 8, 2024 the true crime podcast Method and Madness featured an episode on Romona's case titled "Indifference: The Murder of Ramona Moore". It was released on what would have been Romona's 43rd birthday. The ABC television series NYPD 24/7 in 2004 featured a seven-episode, weekly series about the police, with extensive coverage by film crews to convey the truth of the officers' jobs. Police Commissioner Raymond Kelly in the Mayor Michael Bloomberg administration agreed to have the fabled department filmed. A total of 2,000 hours of film was shot over 16 months for the series. The July 13, 2004, episode featured unfolding elements of the earlier Ramona Moore investigation.

== See also ==
- List of solved missing person cases (2000s)
