= The Ran-Dells =

American musical group

The Ran-Dells were an American musical ensemble from Villas, New Jersey, United States. In 1963 their novelty song "Martian Hop" peaked at number 27 on the US Billboard black singles chart, number 16 on the Billboard Hot 100, and number 2 in Canada. Despite releasing two follow-ups, lack of further chart entries made them one-hit wonders.

The trio, who were first cousins, signed to producer Don Kirshner's fledgling Chairman record label. Spirt enjoyed later success as drummer with RCA recording act, the Sidekicks, and also with the Red Coats, who were signed to the Laurie label.

John Spirt died in 2003; Steven Rappaport died on July 4, 2007, in Maui, Hawaii, of a heart attack.

== Members ==
- Robert Rappaport
- Steven Rappaport
- John Spirt
