= Miami Beach, New Jersey =

Populated place in Cape May County, New Jersey, US

- Unincorporated community
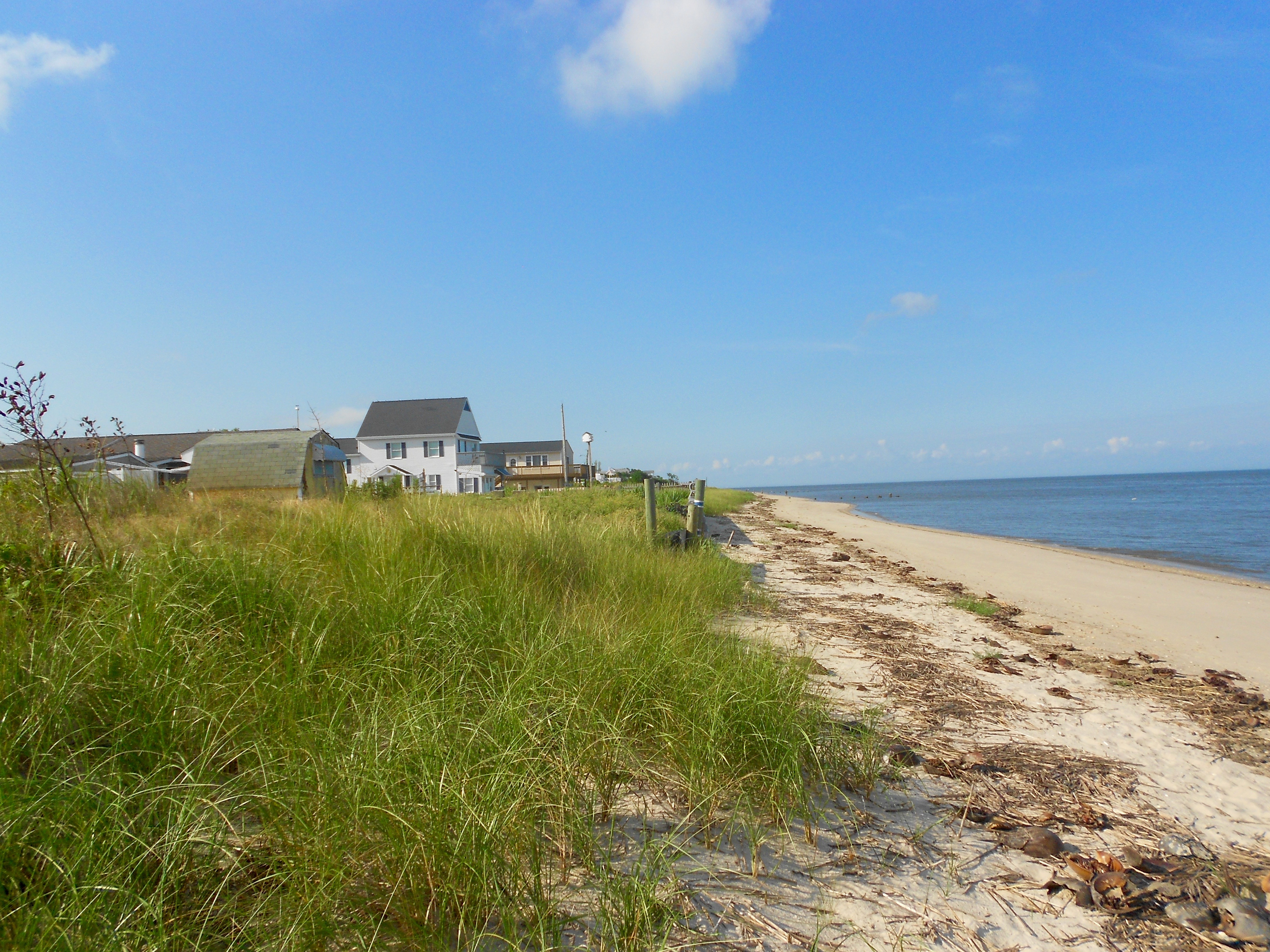
- Looking south from Miami Avenue along the bay shore

- Location within Cape May County, New Jersey Location within New Jersey Location within the United States
- Coordinates: 39°02′04″N 74°56′13″W
- Country: United States
- State: New Jersey
- County: Cape May
- Township: Lower
- Elevation: 3 ft (0.91 m)
- Time zone: UTC−05:00 (Eastern (EST))
  - Summer (DST): UTC−04:00 (EDT)
- Area codes: 609, 640
- GNIS feature ID: 879865

Miami Beach is an unincorporated community in Lower Township in Cape May County, in the U.S. state of New Jersey.

Miami Beach is located on Delaware Bay, and is part of Villas. A beach with the same name as the settlement is also located there.

The area was surveyed in the 1920s by the Miami Beach Builders Corporation of Philadelphia, who established the settlement there.

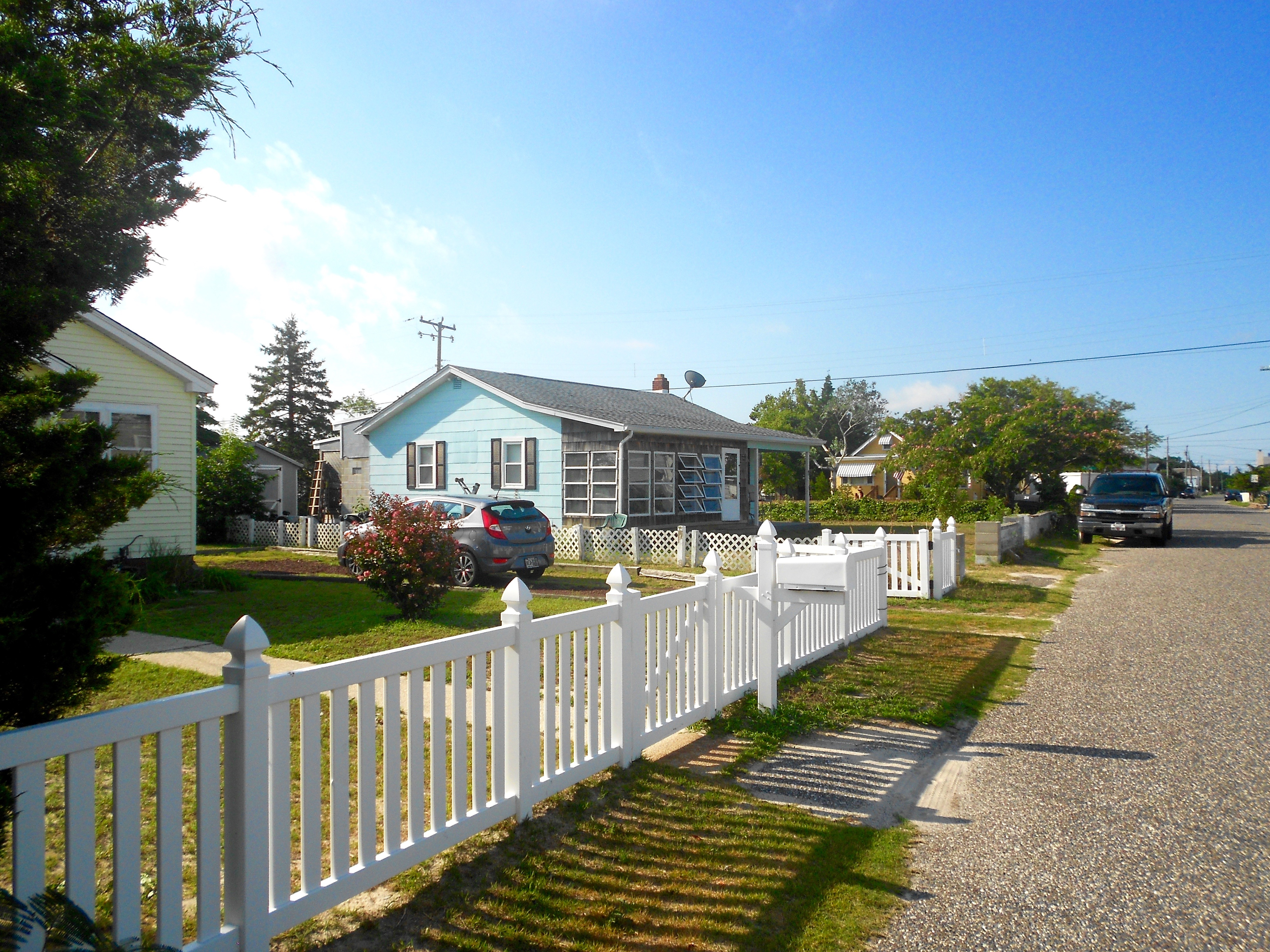
House on Millman Lane

== Education ==
As with other parts of Lower Township, it is served by Lower Township School District for primary grades and Lower Cape May Regional School District for secondary grades; the latter operates Lower Cape May Regional High School.
