= Ariel Zetina =

American musician

Ariel Zetina is a Chicago-based artist, focusing in music production, deejaying, and writing. She is signed by Discwoman in New York, and creates techno music with inspiration from Chicago house, Belizean punta, and the international queer club scene. In 2021, she was profiled by the Grammys as an artist reshaping electronic music.

== Work ==
Zetina has released multiple albums and EPs, the most prominent of which is her 2022 album Cyclorama, which received positive reception from critics and music-focused news outlets, including Pitchfork. She is a resident DJ at the club Smartbar and co runs the party/mix series Rumors. In 2022, she was nominated for Breakthrough DJ-North America by DJ Mag. In 2023, she performed at Pitchfork Music Festival and played an opening set for Beyoncé's Renaissance World Tour in Chicago, Illinois.
