= NYC Artist Coalition =

Arts and nightlife advocacy group

- Formation: 2017
- Type: Advocacy group
- Location: New York City, U.S.
- Website: https://nycartc.com

The NYC Artist Coalition is a New York City based advocacy group concerned with regulation and enforcement affecting small venues and do-it-yourself (DIY) cultural spaces. Founded in 2017, the coalition has been involved in campaigns and public hearings related to the repeal of the New York City Cabaret Law and criticism of multi-agency nightlife inspections conducted under the NYPD-led Multi-Agency Response to Community Hotspots (MARCH) program.

== History ==
The NYC Artist Coalition was formed in January 2017 in response to the 2016 Ghost Ship warehouse fire, to provide support and advocacy for informal community spaces in New York City. In 2017, the Coalition began organizing meetings about DIY spaces among grassroots groups providing proposals to city cultural officials about DIY venue safety and regulations affecting small spaces and preparing proposals for New York City's Department of Cultural Affairs.

The NYC Artist Coalition has lobbied city officials about challenges faced by smaller venues, and organized a “Save NYC Spaces” town hall at Market Hotel in Bushwick, Brooklyn in 2017.

== Advocacy and activities ==
=== Let NYC Dance and New York Cabaret Law repeal ===
The NYC Artist Coalition and the Dance Liberation Network announced the “Let NYC Dance” campaign, including a petition calling for repeal of the New York City Cabaret Law.

In May 2017, that the coalition and the Dance Liberation Network held an event at Market Hotel to introduce the campaign.

In June 2017, coalition representatives testified at a New York City Council hearing on repeal legislation, including arguments that enforcement and licensing dynamics discouraged some venue operators from approaching city agencies, which they said could affect safety practices. The Coalition also participated in a City Hall press conference and written statements submitted to the City Council during the repeal effort.

=== Office of Nightlife ===
In October 2017, a town hall at Market Hotel in Bushwick, Brooklyn organized by the NYC Artist Coalition, focused on expectations for New York City's Office of Nightlife and the role of a "night mayor".

In March 2018, Mayor Bill de Blasio appointed Ariel Palitz as the city's first Senior Executive Director of the Office of Nightlife; a press release announcing the appointment included a statement from the NYC Artist Coalition. amNewYork, The Village Voice, and Grub Street reported that Palitz appeared at events in Bushwick with coalition participation soon after her appointment.

=== MARCH inspections and enforcement ===
In February 2019, members of the coalition testified at a New York City Council hearing about MARCH inspections and said they believed bars serving people of color and LGBTQ patrons were disproportionately targeted.

Coalition member Brian Abelson filed Freedom of Information Law requests seeking documentation about MARCH operations and presented analysis from released records in written testimony to the City Council.

=== Commercial rent regulation ===
In March 2019, the NYC Artist Coalition supported commercial lease-related legislation and other proposals framed as protections for small businesses and cultural spaces facing rent increases.

In January 2020, the Coalition held a #SaveNYC rally that included support for commercial rent stabilization and other protections for small businesses facing rent increases.

In 2021, the NYC Artist Coalition was among groups campaigning for commercial rent stabilization in New York City.

=== COVID-19 relief efforts ===
During the COVID-19 pandemic, the Coalition held virtual meetings focused on relief and survival strategies for nightlife venues and artists.

== See also ==
- New York City Cabaret Law
