= Fauzia =

Fauzia is a given name. It is a variation of the Arabic name Fawzia, meaning victorious. Notable people with the name include:

- Fauzia Gailani, elected to represent Herat Province in Afghanistan's Wolesi Jirga, the lower house of its National Legislature, in 2005
- Fauzia Wahab, Pakistani politician in the Pakistan Peoples Party (PPP)
- Reenat Fauzia, sitarist, daughter of Mobarak Hossain Khan, a musicologist and litterateur
