= Applebee =

Applebee is a surname. Notable people with the surname include:

- Caroline Maria Applebee (c. 1785–1854), British artist
- Constance Applebee (1873–1981), US-based British academic athletic director
- Frank W. Applebee (1902–1988), American painter
- Kelly Applebee (born 1982), Australian cricketer

== See also ==
- Applebee's, American restaurant company
