= Dance party =

Social gathering at which people dance

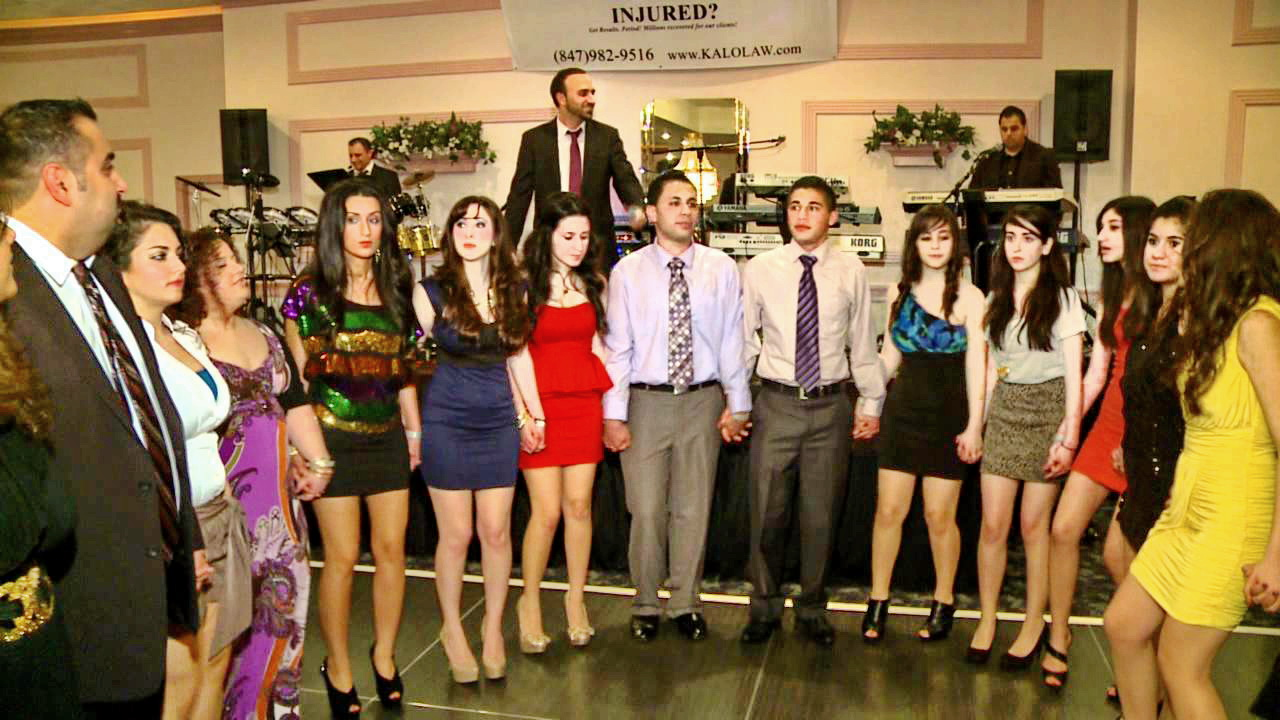
An Assyrian dance party where participants engage in folk dancing, Chicago, USA.

A dance party (also referred to as a dance) is a social gathering where dancing is the primary activity. Some dance parties are held in a casual setting and open to the public, such as a rave, or those held in nightclubs.

Other types of dance parties may be a formal or semi-formal private event which often require guests to don formal wear and have an invitation or membership within the community hosting the event, such as school dances and cotillions.

Guests of formal dances often attend in pairs, as consorts or "dates" for one another. The term "stag" refers to going without a consort to a dance organized for couples. Dances commonly take place during the evening, although some are held earlier during the daytime; such events are known as tea dances.

== Casual dances ==
Casual dances are dances that do not have a formal dress requirement; these may include school and community events, raves, evening entertainments provided for guests aboard a cruise ship, and events organized for certain holidays, such as Halloween and Mardi Gras.

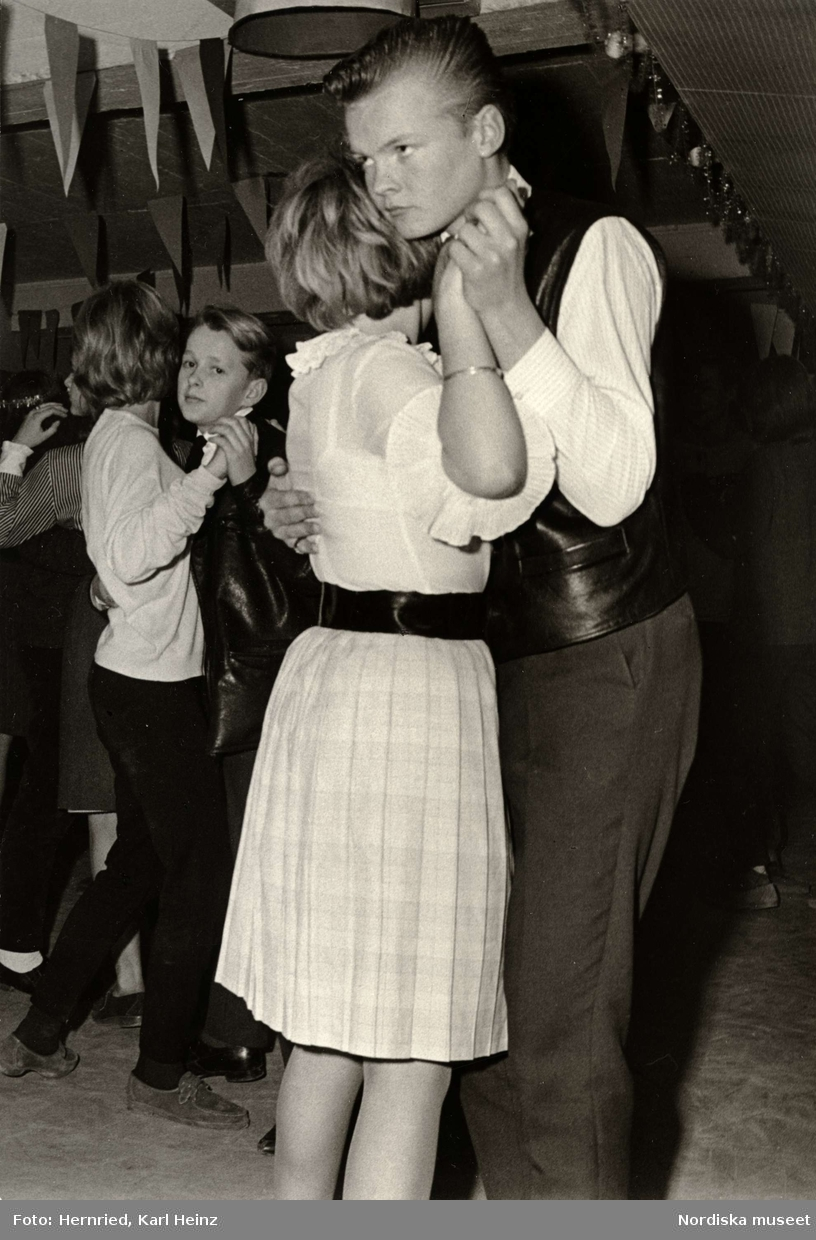
Young couples at a school dance in 1950s Sweden.

== School dances ==
A school dance is a dance sponsored by a school, and may be casual or formal. Casual school dances were originally limited to Western countries, although schools in other countries are beginning to adopt such events. There are some schools, such as Arlington High School in Arlington, Massachusetts, that prohibit school-hosted dances, citing sex and alcohol problems.

=== In the United States ===
One of the most significant school dances is prom, a relatively formal event normally reserved for Junior grade and Senior grade students. Some schools host a winter formal, a similar event, for the lower grades. In the 1950s, informal school dances in the United States were often called sock hops. The traditional Sadie Hawkins dance may be formal or semi-formal.

== Live band dance ==
A live band dance is an event where the means of serving the dancefloor involves the use of a live band. Before the rise of discothèques and DJ-based dancefloors with recorded music (prior to the 1950s), live bands were the ubiquitous means of serving the dancefloor. Along with that, slow-dancing was the primary method of dancing at the time. However; the rise of Rock and Roll music initially made it hard for people to dance when it was popularized in the early 1950s, however people quickly adapted to it and started dancing at higher speeds almost coinciding the rise of DJ-based dancefloors. Live bands have quickly been displaced by DJ-based dancefloors as the DJ stands took up less space than bandstands and that it played recorded music.

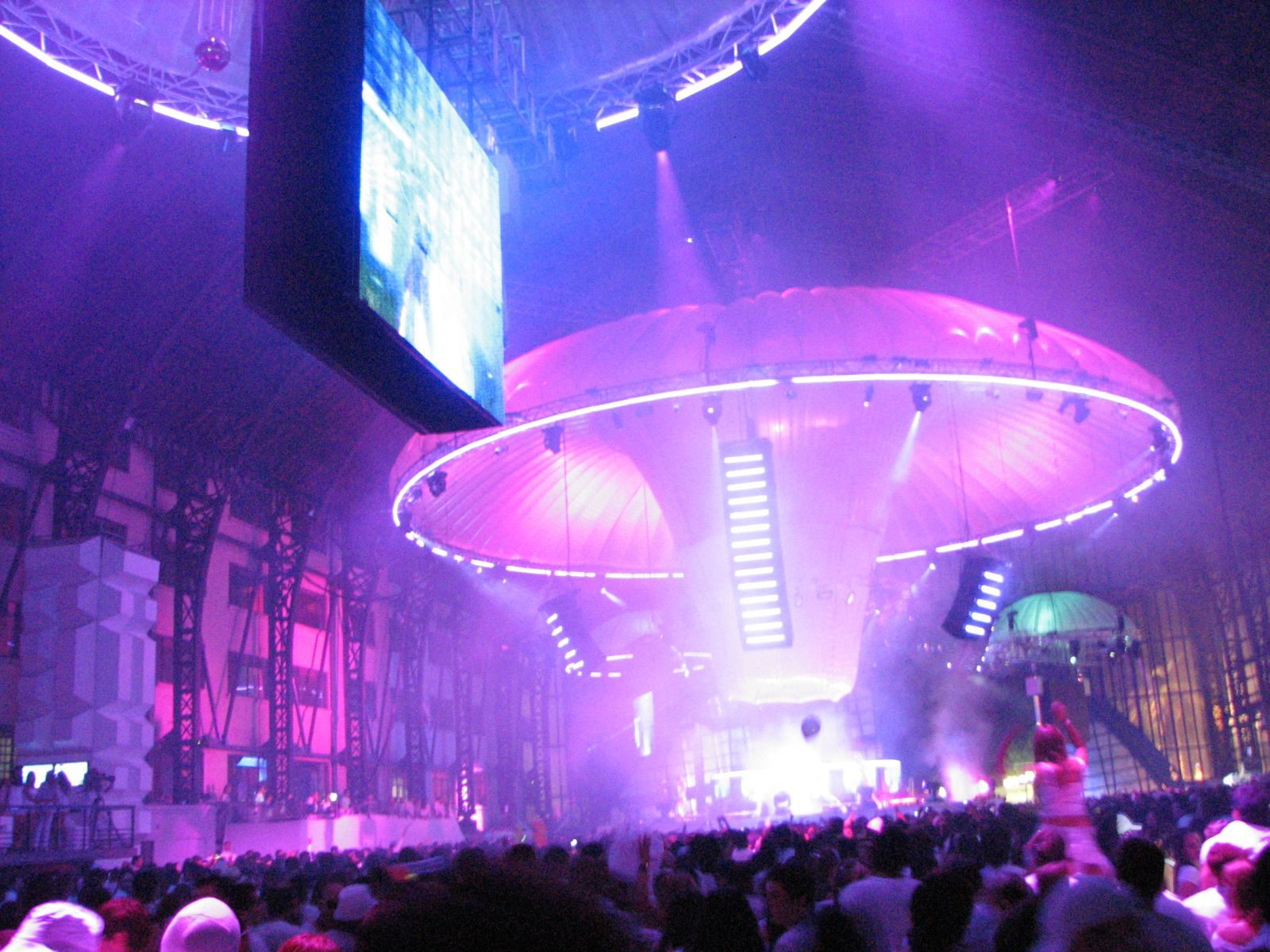
A rave held in a warehouse-sized venue, with elaborate lighting and powerful sound system.

== Popularity ==
In the Jewish community, Bar and Bat Mitzvah celebrations often involve dances.

Dances are common for Quinceañeras, sweet sixteen parties and débutante celebrations. Some of these coming of age events involve a father-daughter dance.

Nurai, a nightclub in Beirut hosted a party event on the 28th August 2017 and by August 30, 2017 it broke the Guinness World Record for hosting a 56-hour long party to show that "it is the best party city in the world!"

In Australia, dance parties are popular amongst teenagers, to the point that many dance parties are held specifically for teenagers in nightclubs or other locations which allow underage guests, who are usually unable to attend such places due to local laws.

== Specialized events ==
East Coast Swing and the Lindy Hop social dance exchange event in Montreal in 2022

Some dance events may put an emphasis on certain genres of dance. For example, an event may feature swing or square dancing rather than dancing in general. A masked ball is a type of costume party that features dancing. Dance parties at which people mainly dance Tango are called Milongas.

== See also ==
- Ball
- Computational musicology
- Dance hall
- Play party (United States)
- Dance music
- Barn dance
- Electronic dance music
- Category:Dance festivals
- Category:Partner dance
- Gospel music
- Rock music
- Soul music
