= Death of Chanel Petro-Nixon =

2006 murder in New York City

Chanel Petro-Nixon
- Born: August 4, 1989
- Died: June 18, 2006 (age 16); Brooklyn, New York, US
- Cause of death: Homicide by strangulation
- Body discovered: June 22, 2006
- Known for: being a missing person and murder victim
- Parents: Anthony Garvin (father); Lucita Nixon (mother)

Chanel Petro-Nixon was an American teenager who was strangled to death in Brooklyn, New York, United States in 2006. In 2016, Veron Primus was charged with the murder.

== Life ==
Chanel Petro-Nixon was born on August 4, 1989, and lived in the Bedford Stuyvesant section of Brooklyn, New York, with her father Anthony Garvin, her mother Lucita Nixon, and her brothers Marcus and Giovanni. She was a member of the Mt. of Olives Seventh-day Adventist Church on Bushwick Avenue and was considered devout by her family based on her church and prayer attendance. She was also an 11th grader at Boys and Girls High School, and was known as a straight-A student who spent her after-school hours in the library. According to Nancy Grace of CNN, "She wanted to become a nurse to help other people".

== Death ==
On Sunday, June 18, 2006, Petro-Nixon left her family's home, telling them she was walking to the Applebee's restaurant near New York Avenue and Fulton Street, to meet a friend. She never returned home.

Four days later, her body was discovered in a trash bag in front of 212 Kingston Avenue. It was determined that Petro-Nixon had been strangled. Petro-Nixon was buried at Rosedale and Rosehill Cemetery, located in Linden, New Jersey.

== Reaction ==
Following his daughter's murder, Anthony Garvin was quoted as saying: "I don't trust anybody [...] That person shaking your hand, smiling in your face, could be the one who did this." Petro-Nixon's mother, Lucita, took a different viewpoint stating, "I won't let anger poison me". A teenage friend of Petro-Nixon's said: "She would never do anything wrong." The friend also said the two had read The Da Vinci Code together and that Petro-Nixon was a good student: "She had good grades. I would call her the 'little nerd.'"

Petro-Nixon's parents made a plea to the public requesting help finding her killer. They also visited the site where she was found.

On July 7, 2006, the Brooklyn Branch of the N.A.A.C.P. sent a letter to Police Commissioner Raymond W. Kelly requesting a meeting. The letter mentioned "increasing rates of crime", "inadequate police response", and the murder of Petro-Nixon.

== Investigation ==
Police quickly appealed to the public for information, offering an initial reward of $12,000 for useful information.

At a later date, the reward amount was increased, ultimately reaching $38,000. The fund represents contributions by Mayor Michael R. Bloomberg, The New York Daily News, The Reverend Al Sharpton, and the New York City Police Department. No one has claimed the reward.

The New York City Police Department interviewed all of Petro-Nixon's friends and collected hundreds of tips.

An article in the New York Daily News focused on Petro-Nixon's white sneakers, with the hope that someone would have recognized her shoes.

Cops hope a photo of 16-year-old Chanel Petro-Nixon's white and pink retro jordan sneakers will jog a witness' memory and help investigators track down the Brooklyn girl's killer.

David Stein, head of the detective squad working the case, was quoted as saying, "You see a case like this maybe once in a career."

== Arrest ==
In June 2016, Brooklyn District Attorney Kenneth Thompson announced that former Crown Heights resident Veron Primus had been formally charged with Petro-Nixon's murder. Primus had been a school friend of Petro-Nixon's and it was later found that he was the friend she was meeting at Applebee's on the day she disappeared. It was reported that he was considered a suspect from day one, but there had not been enough evidence to lead to an arrest.

Some years after Petro-Nixon's murder, Primus had also served time in prison for violating a restraining order and was deported to St. Vincent and the Grenadines, following his release. In 2016, while in St. Vincent, he became a suspect in the abduction of one woman and the murder of another. While investigating these crimes, St. Vincent authorities found new evidence linking Primus to Petro-Nixon's murder. They contacted New York investigators, who traveled to the island and were then able to issue an indictment.

As of 2024, Primus is imprisoned in St. Vincent, where he was convicted and sentenced to 34 years imprisonment for the unrelated murder of a 33-year-old estate agent named Sharleen Greaves. The current Brooklyn DA, Eric Gonzalez, stated that he wished for Primus to be returned to the United States and stand trial for Petro-Nixon's murder.

== Aftermath ==
Murder statistics compiled by the NYPD and obtained by the New York Daily News mentioned Petro-Nixon. Another murder which occurred on the same day as Petro-Nixon's was mentioned, and there was speculation that both murders may be related. New York Daily News columnist Errol Louis, who tried to keep the story 'alive' in the press, reported that there was an upward spike in murder in Crown Heights by 122%, and that community meetings were being held by Assemblyman Karim Camara. Petro-Nixon's mother was quoted in a New York Times story, related to the case: "We try our best to keep it alive." And, "We really don't want her death to be in vain".

In January 2007, CNN aired a video featuring Nancy Grace discussing unsolved murders, including Petro-Nixon's.

As of 24 June 2007, the case had still not been solved. There were no witnesses known to have seen Petro-Nixon murdered, nor had any suspects been identified. The Reverend Al Sharpton joined with the television show, America's Most Wanted, in trying to solve the mystery of her murder and used strong language directed to the Black community in presenting the case of Petro-Nixon's murder.

Petro-Nixon's mother, Lucita, had been scheduled to receive a "survivor's" award in January 2008. More than two years had passed and there had been no further revelations in Petro-Nixon's murder.

On June 19, 2010, a rally, march, and prayer vigil were held in honor of Petro-Nixon. The blog site mentioning this rally also stated that as of that late date no further evidence of her murder had been provided.

A website was created in memory of Petro-Nixon as well as to reach out to the public to obtain information or help in locating her murderer.

== See also ==
- Lists of solved missing person cases
- List of unsolved murders (2000–present)
