= New York City Cabaret Law =

Nightlife legislation

New York City Council
- Long title: New York City Cabaret Law
- Territorial extent: New York City
- Enacted by: New York City Council
- Enacted: 1926
- Repealed: October 31, 2017
- Administered by: New York City Department of Consumer Affairs
- Status: Repealed

The New York City Cabaret Law was a dancing ban originally enacted in 1926, during Prohibition, and repealed in 2017. It referred to the prohibition of dancing in all New York City spaces open to the public selling food and/or drink unless they had obtained a cabaret license. It prohibited "musical entertainment, singing, dancing or other form of amusement" without a license.

Critics argued that the license was expensive and difficult to obtain and that enforcement was arbitrary and weaponized against marginalized groups, but proponents insisted that the law minimized noise complaints.

At the time of the 2017 repeal of the law, after amendments over the years, the law required a license for cabarets, defined as:

3. "Cabaret." Any room, place or space in the city in which any musical entertainment, singing, dancing or other form of amusement is permitted in connection with the restaurant business or the business of directly or indirectly selling to the public food or drink, except eating or drinking places, which provide incidental musical entertainment, without dancing, either by mechanical devices, or by not more than three persons.

== History ==
The New York City Cabaret Law was passed in 1926, during the Harlem Renaissance. An attorney and professor challenging the cabaret law wrote that the law originally targeted jazz clubs in Harlem and the social mixing of races, but a historian of the period rejects the view and said there is "little evidence" for that to be the case.

In proposing the law, the Committee on Local Laws argued that "there has been altogether too much running 'wild' in some of these night clubs and, in the judgement of your Committee, the 'wild' stranger and the foolish native should have the check-rein applied a little bit." In referring to "running wild," the 1926 Committee may have been alluding to the popular 1920s song "Runnin' Wild", which popularized the Charleston dance.

From 1940 to 1967, the New York Police Department issued regulations requiring musicians and other employees in cabarets to obtain a New York City Cabaret Card, and musicians such as Chet Baker, Charlie Parker, Thelonious Monk, and Billie Holiday had their right to perform suspended.

In 1971, the Cabaret Law was modified to exempt musical performance "by not more than three persons playing piano, organ, accordion or guitar or any stringed instrument," which disproportionately affected jazz since drums, reeds, and horns were not allowed, as was stated in the Chiasson I case and the Chevigny book. The so-called three-musician rule was not found in the original 1926 text of the bill.

Throughout its history, the law was selectively enforced, with its most notable enforcer, former mayor Rudy Giuliani, resurrecting the dormant rule as part of his implementation of broken windows policing to fine and shut down perceived nuisance bars in the late 1990s.

== Cabaret licensing ==
All applicants for a cabaret license had to be fingerprinted; to provide extensive financial records; to meet specific zoning, surveillance, physical security, fire, building, electrical, health, and record keeping requirements; and to pay the fees associated with each compliance.

In 2016, the New York City Department of Consumer Affairs claimed there were then 118 cabaret licenses in a city of 25,100 licensed food service establishments.

== Criticism and challenges ==
The law was heavily criticized both by the general public and from within city government. Reporting in The Baffler noted that cabaret violations were often issued through M.A.R.C.H. (Multi-Agency Response to Community Hotspots), an NYPD-led multi-agency inspection program targeting nightlife venues and other establishments.

The limits on types of instruments were ruled unconstitutional in Warren Chiasson v. New York City Department of Consumer Affairs, 132 Misc.2d 640 (N.Y. County Sup. Ct., 1986), and the three-musician limit was found to be unconstitutional in a later decision in the same case in Warren Chiasson v. New York City Department of Consumer Affairs, 138 Misc.2d 394 (N.Y. County Sup. Ct., 1988). Although the code was changed to reflect the ruling as to types of instrument, the text to reflect the elimination of the three-musician limit was not corrected in the text of the New York City Administrative Code.

A broader challenge to the Cabaret Law and New York City's Zoning Resolution under the New York State Constitution was rejected in John Festa v. New York City Department of Consumer Affair, 12 Misc. 3d 466 (Sup. Ct. NY County 2006), but the court urged legislative review of the law and concluded, "Surely, the Big Apple is big enough to find a way to let people dance."

In 2015, Brooklyn attorney and bar owner Andrew Muchmore filed a case in the United States District Court for the Eastern District of New York against the law, claiming it violated the First and Fourteenth Amendments of the US Constitution. The Muchmore case challenged the Cabaret Law, but neither New York City's Zoning Resolution nor the regulation of dancing by the New York State Liquor Authority.

In June of 2017, then-New York City Councilmember Rafael Espinal introduced a bill for the full repeal of the regulation citing its oppressive nature on NYC's residents on their rights to dance, the negative impacts on New York City's nighttime economy and its artist communities.

== Repeal ==
Several efforts were founded over time to repeal the cabaret law, including Legalize Dancing NYC in the early 2000s and Metropolis in Motion later in that decade. Both of those organizations worked to raise public awareness around the issue through a variety of actions, and worked in parallel with legal efforts to repeal the Cabaret Law.

In 2017, Dance Liberation Network was formed, co-founded by Frankie Decaiza Hutchinson of Discwoman. In 2017, groups including the NYC Artist Coalition and Dance Liberation Network linked the cabaret law to safety and enforcement pressures affecting DIY venues and advocated for repeal. They began the 'Let NYC Dance' movement to campaign for the repeal of the law.

In June, then-New York City Councilmember Rafael Espinal introduced a bill for the full repeal of the regulation. It was passed 44-1 by the City Council on October 31, 2017.

Notwithstanding the repeal of the licensing requirements of the Cabaret Law, under the City's Zoning Resolution, dancing is banned in the many areas of the City zoned residential or mixed-commercial-residential.

The City's Department of Buildings enforces the Zoning Resolution and the New York State Liquor Authority (SLA) will terminate the license of venues serving alcohol and allowing dancing if the Method of Operation in the issued Liquor Permit does not allow dancing. The SLA cooperates with community boards and will not issue licenses with dancing in areas where dancing is banned by the Zoning Resolution or if strongly opposed by the local board.

== See also ==
- Dancing ban
- New York City Cabaret Card
- Nightlife legislation in New York City
- Stop-and-frisk in New York City
- NYC Artist Coalition
