= Play party (United States) =

Type of social event for children

A play party is a social event in which people gather to sing and dance. Play parties began in the 1830s in the United States as a route around strict religious practices banning dancing and the playing of musical instruments. The areas most influenced by the practice were the Southern and Midwestern parts of the United States. Folk songs, many of European and English origin, were used as means to give the attendants choreographed movements for each phrase. No instruments were played at the events, as they were banned by the religious movements of the area. Singing and clapping were used to convey each song. Because dancing was banned, the movements took on the quality of children's games. Though the performance of play parties dwindled in the 1950s, music educators use them as ways to incorporate music and dance in their classrooms.

== See also ==
- Dance party
