= Andrea Peyser =

American columnist

Andrea Peyser is a columnist for the New York Post, known for her coverage of many scandals involving public figures. Her two books are Mother Love, Deadly Love: The Susan Smith Murders (1995) and Celebutards: The Hollywood Hacks, Limousine Liberals and Pandering Politicians Who Are Destroying America (2009).

== Early life and education ==
Peyser was born to a Jewish family, the daughter of Austrian-born Ruth (née Sophie Staendig) and German-born mathematician Gideon Peyser. Her parents met while serving in the Israeli army and later settled in New York City in the 1950s. Andrea grew up in Queens, with an older sister, Rhona (who died in 2002) and graduated from Bayside High School. She attended the State University of New York at New Paltz and Albany.

== Career ==
Peyser's first job in journalism after graduating from college was a temporary assignment for the Albany, New York, bureau of the Associated Press. She then moved to the West Virginia bureau, followed by a brief time at CNN, and then moved to The Tampa Tribune.

Peyser was hired by the New York Post in 1989, and became a columnist after her coverage of an alleged sex scandal concerning the New York Mets during spring training in the early 1990s. In 1995 she released, Mother Love, Deadly Love: The Susan Smith Murders (HarperCollins).

The Washington Post has described Peyser as an "object of fascination among some media observers in New York, who count her unforgiving, exuberantly spiteful columns as a guilty pleasure." New York magazine described her as "the Madame Defarge of the New York Post" in a 2004 profile.

In 2009, she came out with Celebutards: The Hollywood Hacks, Limousine Liberals and Pandering Politicians Who Are Destroying America through the publisher Kensington.

== Criticism ==
In October 2001, Peyser's employer, New York Post owner Rupert Murdoch, offered a rare personal apology over Peyser's reference to CNN correspondent Christiane Amanpour in a September 21 column as a "CNN war slut".

In May 2012, The Observer and New York magazine noted that in eight years she has celebrated the possibility of nine different people getting raped in jail.

In December 2013, Peyser was criticized for her commentary on the state funeral of Nelson Mandela. In her column, Peyser wrote that President Obama behaved like a "hormone-ravaged frat boy on a road trip to a strip bar". She concluded by saying that President Obama "has some 'splaining to do", an expression of Ricky Ricardo from the I Love Lucy show.

== Family and personal ==
She is married to Mark D. Phillips, a photojournalist and website designer. They have a daughter, Eliza, and live in Brooklyn.

After a few months absence from the Post, in November 2017 Peyser publicly disclosed that she has multiple sclerosis, which she was diagnosed with in 2008.
