= Cape May =

Cape at the southernmost point of New Jersey

- Peninsula
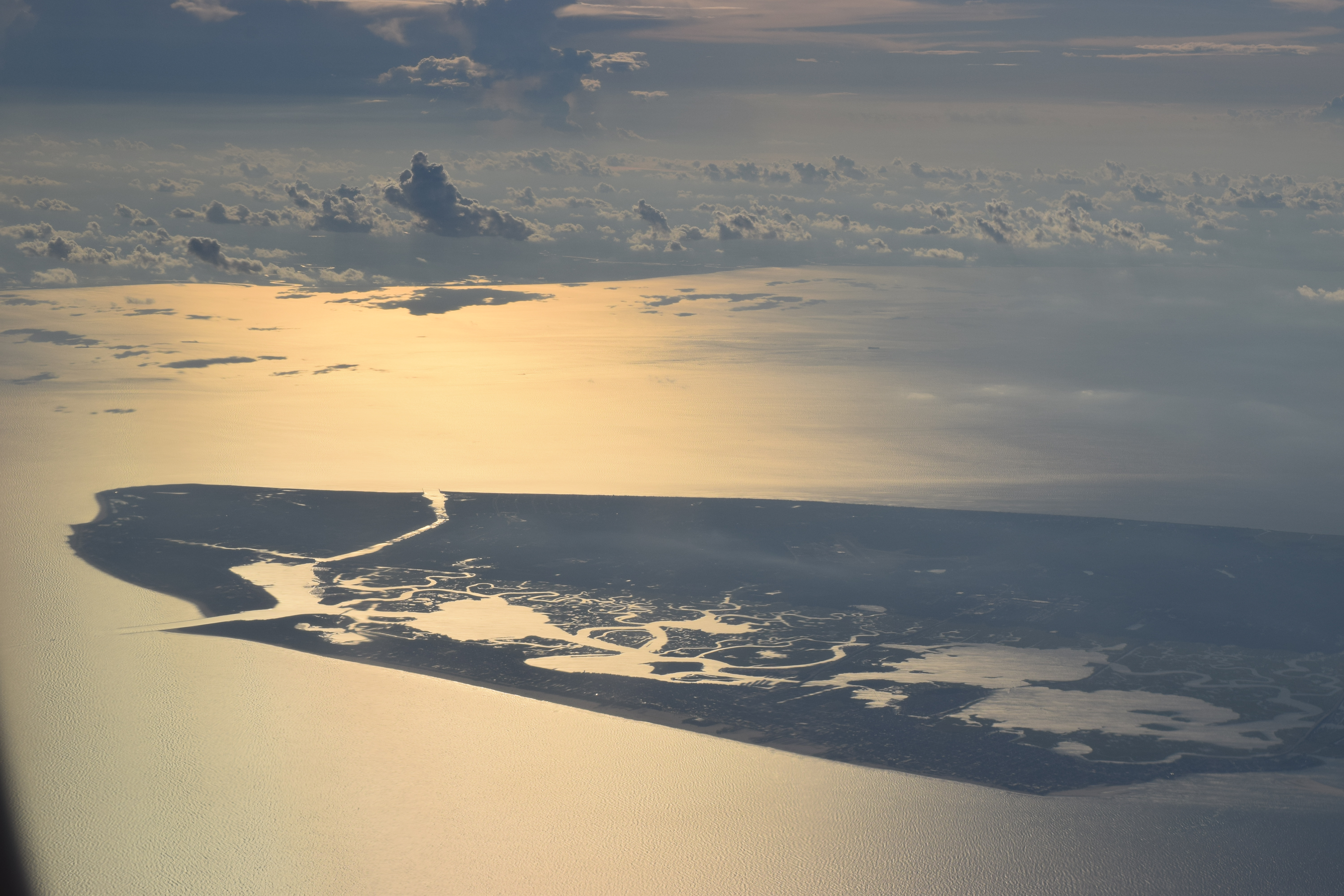
- Aerial view of the peninsula of Cape May

- Location within Cape May County, New Jersey Location within New Jersey Location within the United States
- Coordinates: 38°57′33″N 74°55′39″W
- Etymology: Named for Cornelius Jacobsen May

Cape May consists of a peninsula and barrier island system in the U.S. state of New Jersey. It is roughly coterminous with Cape May County and runs southwards from the New Jersey mainland, separating Delaware Bay from the Atlantic Ocean. The southernmost point in both New Jersey and the northeastern United States lies on the cape.

Several resort communities line the Atlantic side of the cape, including Ocean City, the most populous community on the cape, The Wildwoods, known for its architecturally significant hotel district, and the city of Cape May, which has served as a resort community since the mid-18th century, making it the oldest such resort in the U.S.

== Etymology ==
The peninsula is named for Cornelius Jacobsen May, a Dutch explorer who worked for the Dutch East India Company.

== Geography and ecology ==
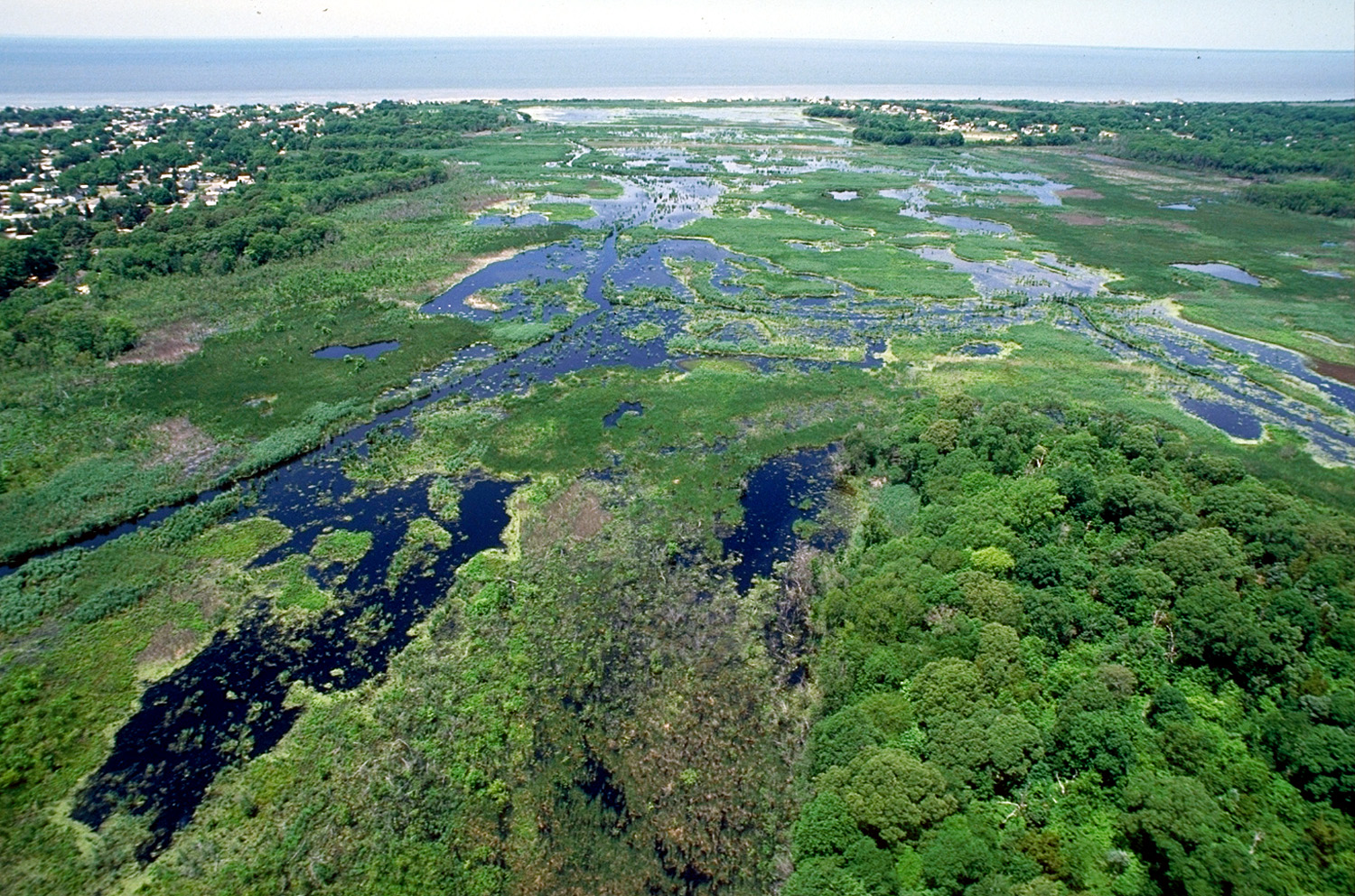
Cape May's wetlands

The peninsula comprises the municipalities of Avalon, Cape May, Cape May Point, Dennis Township, Lower Township, Middle Township, North Cape May, North Wildwood, Stone Harbor, West Cape May, West Wildwood, and Wildwood Crest. The region is a popular destination for Québécois tourists. It is part of the Southern Shore Region.

The city of Cape May, located on the island and south of the peninsula, is home to the oldest seaside resort in the nation with historical roots dating back to the 18th century. The entire city was designated as a National Historic Landmark on May 11, 1976, and many of the buildings throughout the town are original Victorian structures that have been maintained in pristine condition. The basic training camp of the United States Coast Guard is located in Cape May. This facility is the only enlisted basic training center for the United States Coast Guard in the country. Each recruit goes through eight weeks of training before being shipped out.

Cape May is also famous as one of the top birding sites in North America. There are many different parks and birding sites in the area. Due to its location at the southern tip of New Jersey and numerous nature preserves and wildlife refuges, large concentrations of birds can be found in Cape May, especially during spring and fall migration. Cape May Bird Observatory acts as the central coordinator of birding activities in Cape May, including the World Series of Birding, held in Cape May and throughout New Jersey annually in May.

=== Cape Island ===
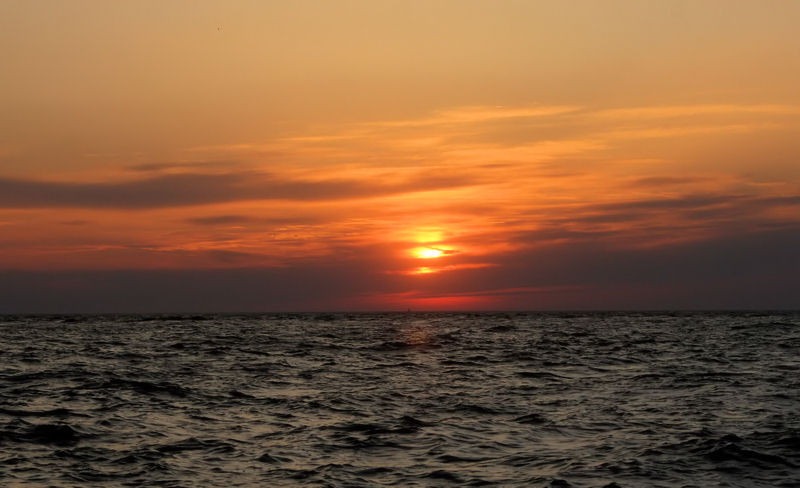
Sunset Beach on Cape May

Cape Island is a man-made island at the southern tip of Cape May County, which consists of Cape May, Cape May Point, West Cape May and portions of Lower Township. The island is separated from the mainland and the rest of Cape May County by the man-made Cape May Canal, Cape Island Creek and Cape May Harbor, which cut it off from the rest of the Cape May Peninsula. Cape May Canal is a 2.9-nautical-mile (3.3 mi; 5.4 km) waterway connecting Cape May Harbor to the Delaware Bay, at the southern tip of Cape May County, New Jersey. Before the canal was built, "Cape Island" referred to the site of the City of Cape May, southeast of Cape Island Creek, a tidal "creek" and marsh that has been partly filled in at its southern end.

== History ==
The Kechemeche tribe of the Lenape were the first residents of the area that historians know of. Each summer, the Native Americans vacationed at what is now Cape May to escape the summer heat. While there, they fished, hunted, and collected fruits before the advent of autumn mandated the return to their inland villages.

The first European to catch a glimpse of Cape May was navigator Henry Hudson and 18 of his crew mates on the Halve Maen. On August 28, 1609, while searching for the Northwest Passage, Hudson decided to sail up the unexplored Delaware Bay. Several miles up the coast, strong tides pulled the Halve Maen to a sandbar, and the crew was stranded until thunderstorms and wind aided the ship around the Cape May peninsula. This event was recorded by Hudson's first mate, Robert Juet.

News of his discovery sparked a search for the location of a new trading post. English explorer Samuel Argall explored the bay and named it for the governor of the Virginia Colony, Lord De La Warr. The Dutch also sent some navigators to look for suitable sites for trading ventures. Among the band of explorers were Adriaen Block, Cornelis Jacobsen Mey, and others.

The recorded history of Cape May stretches back to 1620, when Captain Cornelius Jacobsen Mey surveyed and named the area for himself. It later grew from a small settlement to the large beach resort it has been since the 19th century. The City of Cape May asserts that its status as a vacation spot began in 1766, with Philadelphians coming in by stagecoaches, ships, and horse-drawn wagons, and that the Kechemeche Lenape had primarily used the land for hunting beforehand. Hotels were already on Cape May as of 1834.

In 1782, during the American Revolutionary War, the young Continental Navy Lieutenant Joshua Barney fought with a British squadron at Cape May and Delaware Bay. Barney's force of three sloops defeated a Royal Navy frigate, a sloop-of-war and a Loyalist privateer. The battle ended with the loss of two British vessels and one American sloop.

== See also ==
- Cape May County
- Cape May Light
- Cape May Historic District
- National Register of Historic Places listings in Cape May County, New Jersey
