= SS Atlantus =

Early twentieth-century concrete ship

Coordinates: 38°56′40″N 74°58′19″W

- SS Atlantus underway, June 1919

History

United States
- Name: SS Atlantus
- Owner: USSB (1919–1925); H. P. Etheridge (1925-April 30, 1926); National Navigation Company (April 30, 1926-)
- Operator: Raporel Steamship Line (August 16, 1919–1920); Clyde Steamship Company (1920); National Navigation Company (April 30, 1926-)
- Ordered: December 17, 1917
- Builder: Liberty Ship Building Company, Brunswick, Georgia
- Cost: $1,125,129.40 ($20.7 million in 2025)
- Laid down: March 18, 1918
- Launched: December 4, 1918
- In service: 1919
- Out of service: 1920
- Home port: Brunswick, Georgia
- Identification: Hull number 997; Official number 218120; Code letters LRGQ

General characteristics
- Type: EFC Design 1040 concrete freighter
- Tonnage: 2,391 GRT; 1,435 NRT to 1,502 NRT; 3,000 DWT (Note: The ship's designed deadweight tonnage. Because the deadweight displacement ratio turned out lower than expected, the true figure was reported as low as 2,542 DWT.)
- Length: 260 ft 2.5 in (79.312 m) (o/a); 250 ft 0 in (76.20 m) (p/p)
- Beam: 43 ft 6 in (13.26 m)
- Draft: 22 ft 6 in (6.86 m)
- Depth: 26 ft 9 in (8.15 m)
- Decks: One
- Installed power: Two boilers fueled by 16 oil bunkers of 220,000 US gallons (830,000 L; 180,000 imp gal) capacity (Note: The original EFC plans indicate coal, but as built, she used oil.)
- Propulsion: Worthington three-cylinder triple-expansion steam engine; 188 nhp; 1,400 ihp (1,000 kW)
- Speed: 10.5 knots (19.4 km/h; 12.1 mph)
- Crew: 34

SS Atlantus is a concrete ship built by the Liberty Shipbuilding Company in Brunswick, Georgia, United States and outfitted by the American Shipbuilding Company. Although she was not finished in time for war service, she was the first of twelve concrete ships for the World War I Emergency Fleet that finished construction, and the second concrete ship built in the United States (after the Faith). She served as a cargo ship from 1919–1920, then was laid up until sold for scrap in 1925. Her hulk was towed to Cape May, New Jersey in 1926 with the intent of sinking her for use as a ferry pier. After troubles, the project was abandoned, and her wreck lies just off the shore of Sunset Beach.

== History ==
The Liberty Shipbuilding Company was originally contracted by the Shipping Board to construct on an experimental concrete ship on December 17, 1917, with that contract later superseded by another that led to the Atlantus. The experimental construction of the vessel was difficult, and a new burned-clay light-aggregate concrete was developed for her. The cost of the Atlantus was placed at $1,125,129.40 ($20.7 million in 2025). The keel of the Atlantus was laid on March 18, 1918. With the armistice, work on her and other Emergency Fleet vessels was de-prioritized, and she was one of only twelve concrete vessels that would have their construction continued. Originally named Brokenbow, her final name was given by Edith Wilson before being launched. After two failed attempts, the steamer was launched endwise into Oglethorpe Bay on December 4, 1918, at 8:30 a.m.

Her outfitting was done by the American Shipbuilding Company. During a trial run on May 24, 1919, a small fire destroyed one of her life boats. She was intended to sail to the Liberty Shipbuilding Company's shipyard in Wilmington, North Carolina on her initial voyage at 4 a.m. on May 27, 1919, for final touches prior to sailing for New York. However, shortly into the journey, engine trouble forced her back to port for about a week for repairs.

On August 16, 1919, she was turned over to the Raporel Steamship Line to be used in their West Indies service. The Atlantus received temporary documents on November 19, 1919, and her permanent ones on January 24, 1920. The Atlantus was later used by the Clyde Steamship Company, which had purchased Raporel in 1920, to primarily transport coal from Norfolk, Virginia to New England. After seventeen sailings, the ship was found to be unprofitable to operate due to a combination of freight rate drops and operating costs, and she was returned to the Shipping Board to be laid up. The ship was reported to have made several transatlantic journeys at some point before being laid up, but the port records in her log were damaged.

The Atlantus was tied up in the James River in 1920, and her documents were surrendered on October 25, 1922. In 1925, she was purchased by H. P. Etheridge, a salvage company, for $3,025 ($55,535 in 2025). She was stripped of most items of value and then moved to Pig Point off the Craney Island flats, where she sank on way to anchorage. As she was deemed a navigational hazard, it was ordered she be refloated.

On April 30, 1926, during the refloat efforts, Colonel Jesse Rosenfeld purchased the Atlantus. The intention was to use her and two other ships as part of the National Navigation Company's efforts to create a ferry service (a route now served by the Cape May–Lewes Ferry). The plan was to dredge a channel into which the Atlantus would be towed, then submerged by filling it with sand, creating a bridge between the pier and the slips. Afterward, the other two wooden ships would be anchored stern-to-stern with the Atlantus in a Y formation, which would also filled with sand and sunk to create the slips. After being refloated in the afternoon of May 20, 1926, by the Wood Towing Company, she was brought to Norfolk Shipbuilding & Dry Dock Corporation to be readied for towing to Cape May Point, New Jersey. In March 1926, the groundbreaking ceremonies were held for the construction of the ferry dock. The Atlantus arrived at Cape May Point on June 8 at 11 a.m., with the wooden ships slated to be towed in within the next few days. Before she could be placed, the ship was beached in a storm on July 10, 1926. She was refloated on July 11, but dragged anchor several times afterward, including snagging onto a sewer discharge pipe on July 12. It took until the end of the month to free her, place her in the intended position, and sink her. Work resumed with the Atlantus as the pier foundation, but interest in the ferry waned and the project abandoned, leaving her wreck in place.

The wreck was used by the nearby United States Coast Guard training center for breeches buoy training and rescue practice over the next few years. For a time, there was a billboard on the side of the ship advertising boat insurance. Her deteriorating wreckage is split in pieces off Sunset Beach; parts of her can only be viewed at low tide, while others are completely submerged.

== Gallery ==
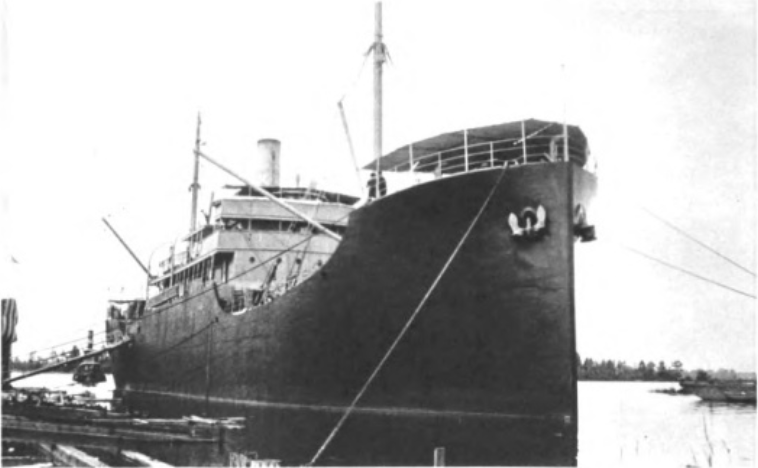
Atlantus moored at dock

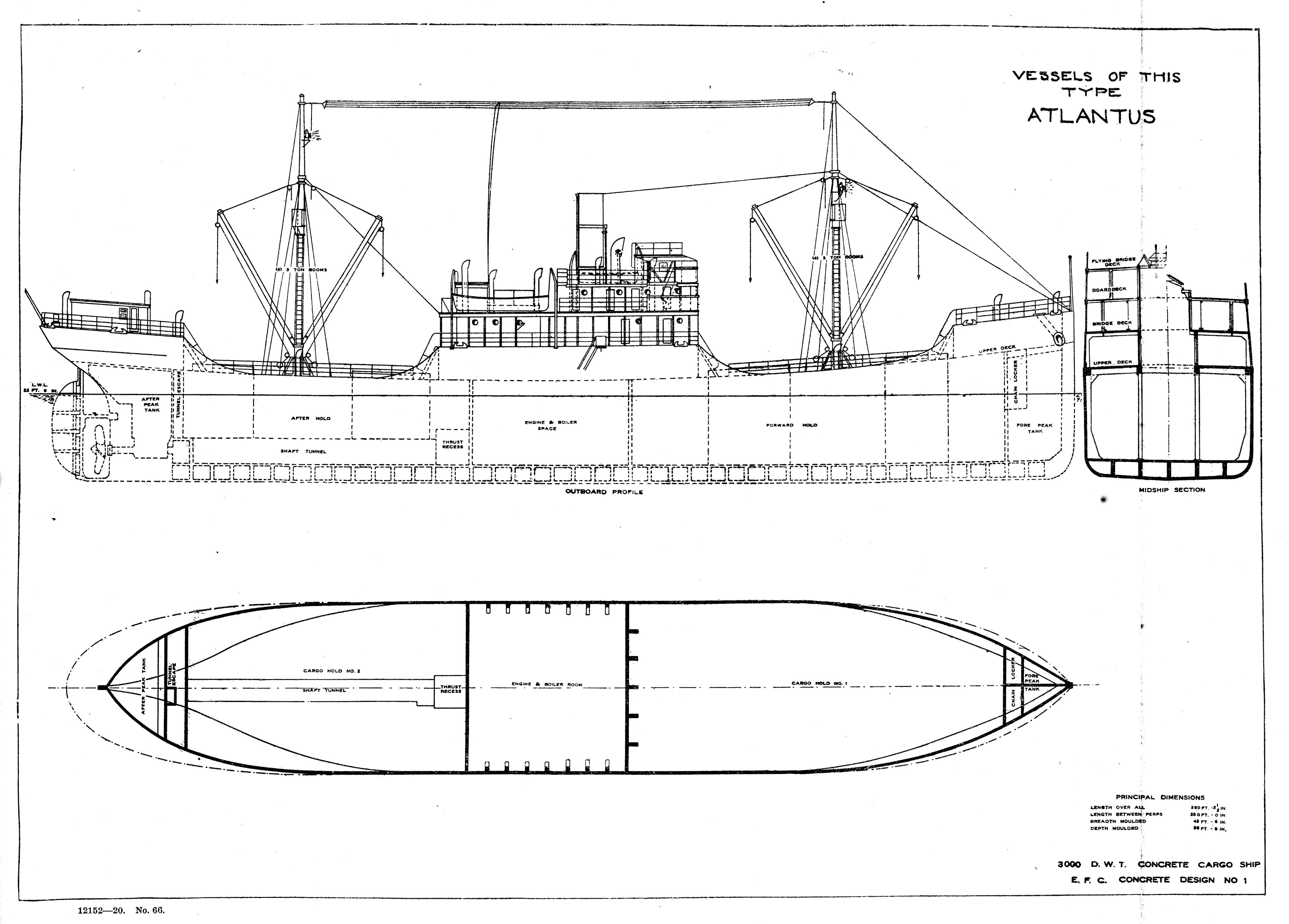
Outboard profile and deck plan

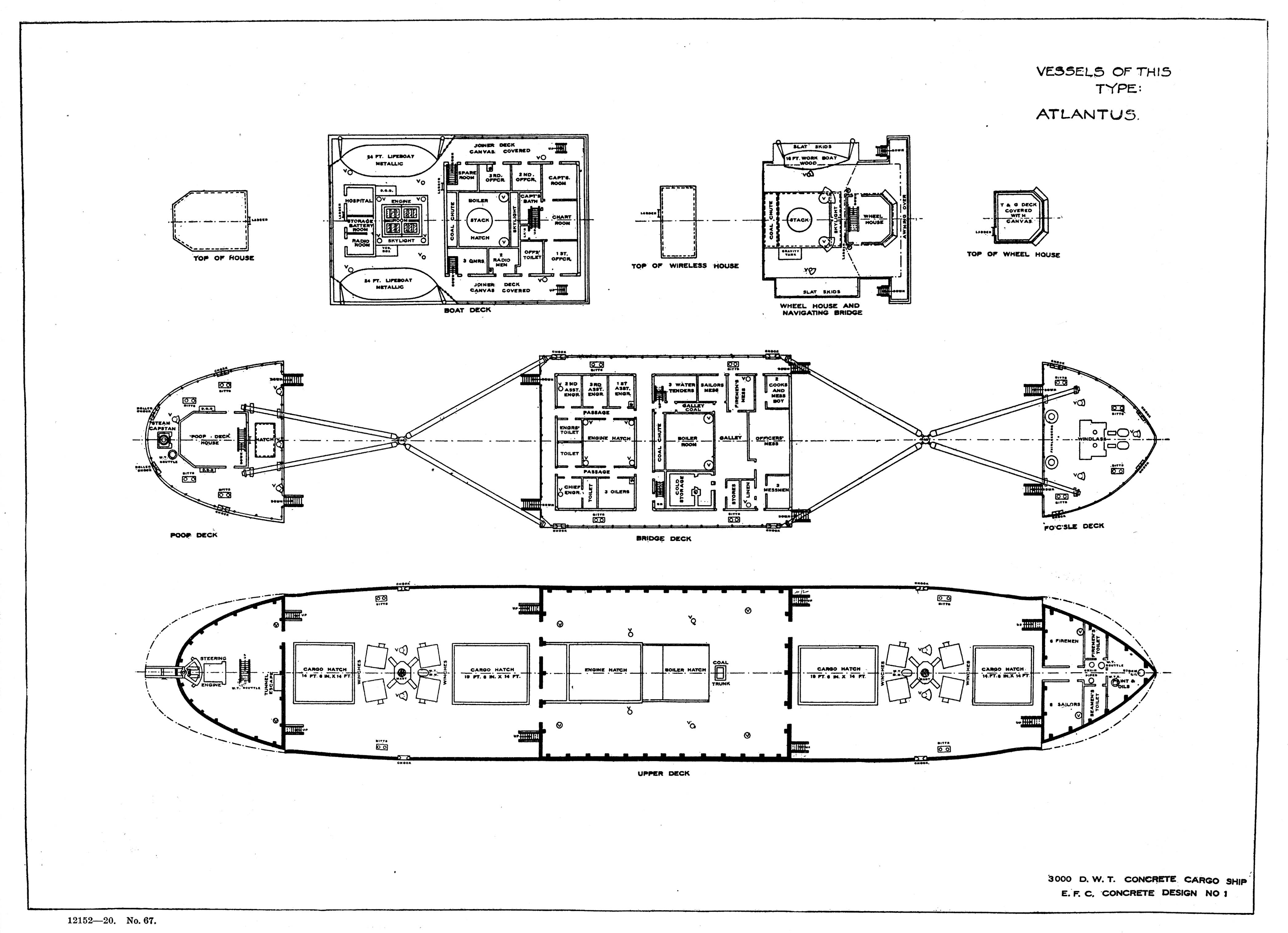
Deck plans

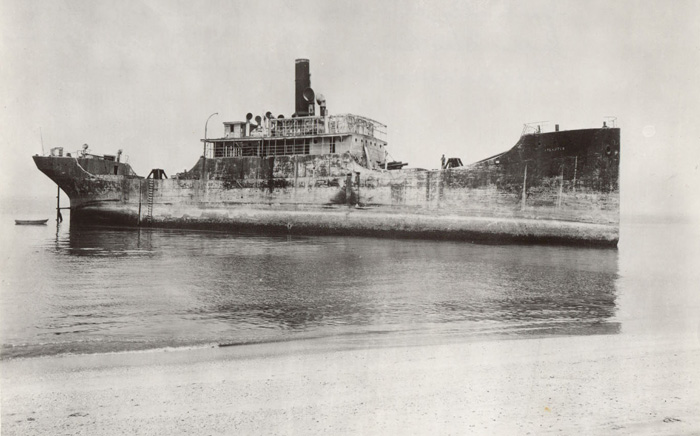
SS Atlantus the day she ran aground

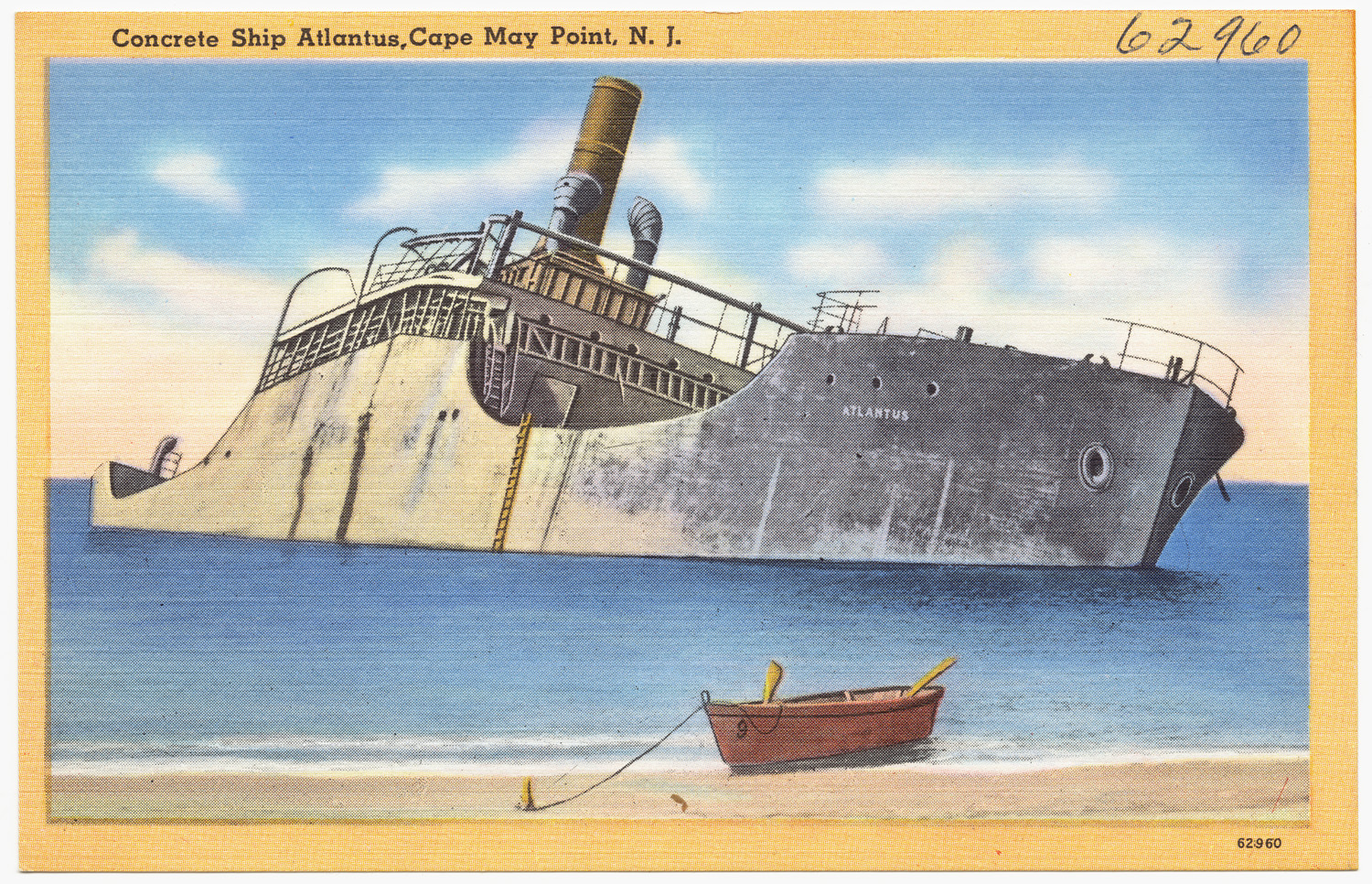
Postcard c.1940

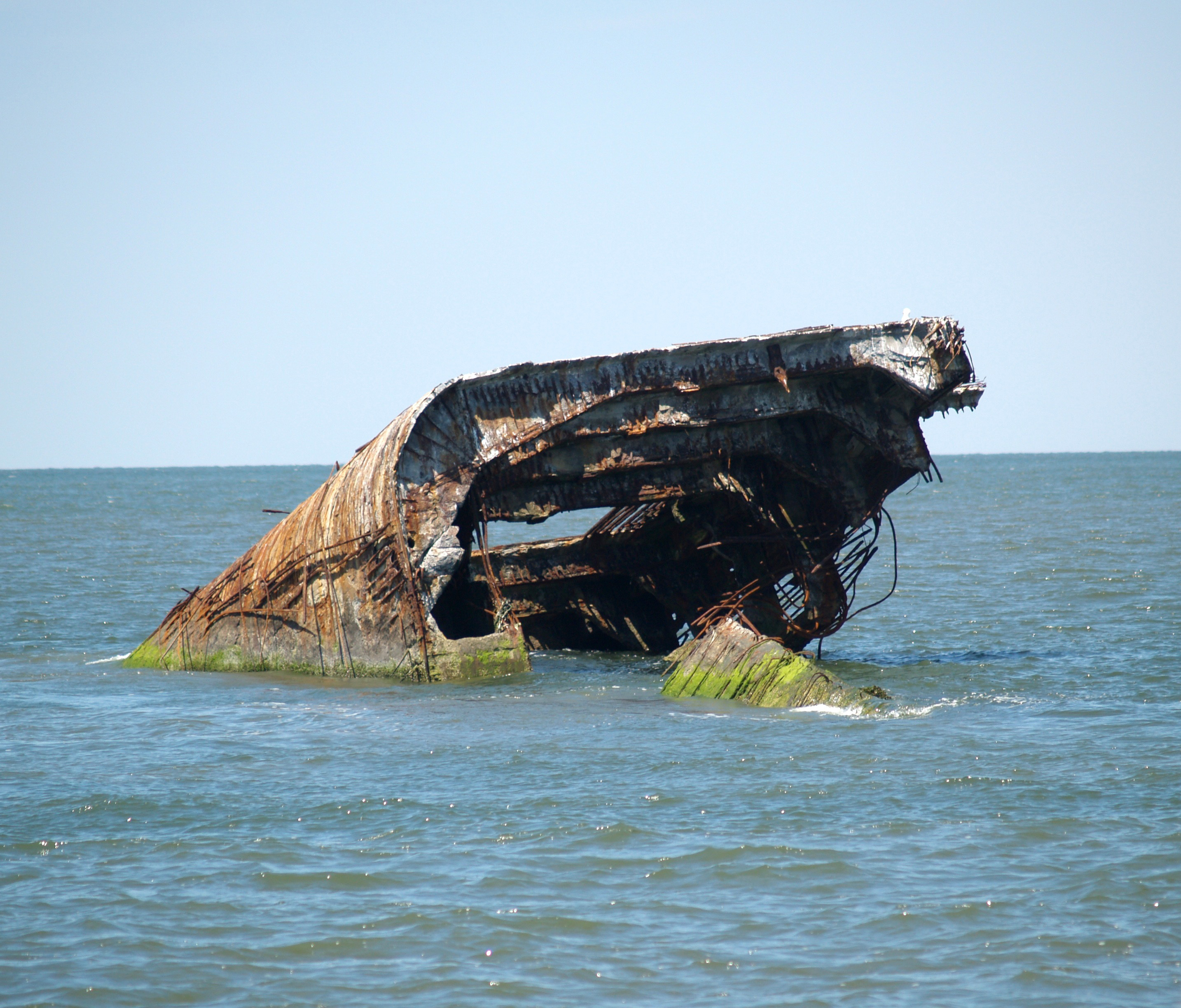
Atlantus in July 2015
