= Saint Peter's-By-The-Sea Episcopal Church (Cape May Point, New Jersey) =

Historic church in New Jersey, United States

- U.S. National Register of Historic Places
- New Jersey Register of Historic Places
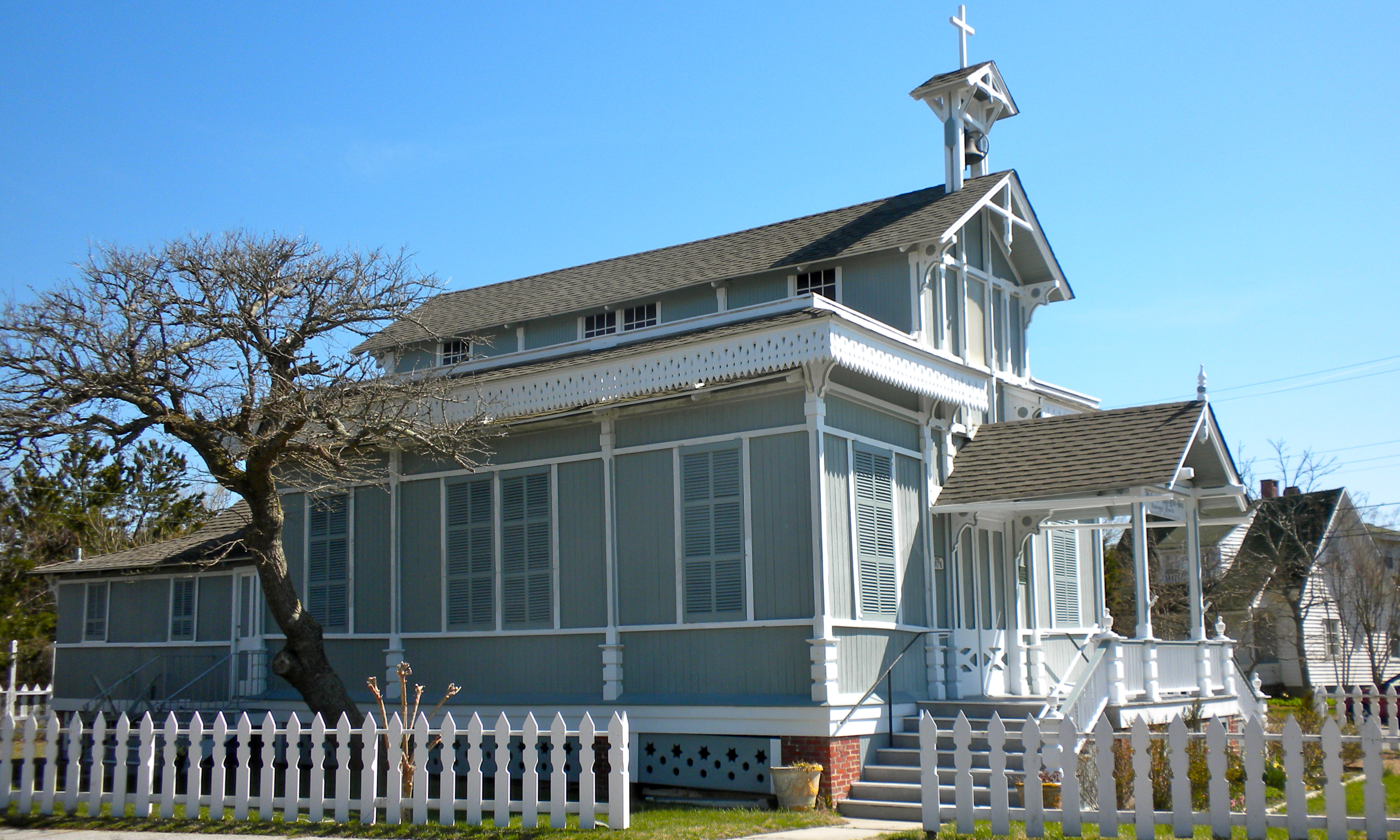

- Location within Cape May County, New Jersey Location within New Jersey Location within the United States
- Location: Jct. of Ocean Avenue and Lake Drive, Cape May Point, New Jersey
- Coordinates: 38°56′3″N 74°58′0″W
- Area: less than one acre
- Built: 1876
- Architectural style: Stick/Eastlake
- NRHP reference No.: 95000978
- NJRHP No.: 2804

Significant dates
- Added to NRHP: August 3, 1995
- Designated NJRHP: June 15, 1995

Saint Peter's-By-The-Sea Episcopal Church, known locally as The Gingerbread Church, is a historic church located at the junction of Ocean Avenue and Lake Drive in Cape May Point, Cape May County, New Jersey, United States. It was documented by the Historic American Buildings Survey in 1992. It was later added to the National Register of Historic Places on August 3, 1995 for its significance in Stick/Eastlake architecture and also community planning and development.

Plate and pledge income reported for the congregation in 2025 was $26,100. Average Sunday attendance (ASA) in 2025 was 43 persons, down from a reported 74 in 2019.

== History ==
The church is a one-story frame building with a high central clerestory and features Stick/Eastlake architecture with the stick components painted white in contrast to the siding in blue. Originally built for Philadelphia's 1876 Centennial Exhibition, the church was moved to Cape May Point in 1879. It has been moved four times since, first to get a cooler location closer to the shore, then, as the shoreline retreated, to safer locations away from the shore. It is now near the original site, and much closer to the shore.

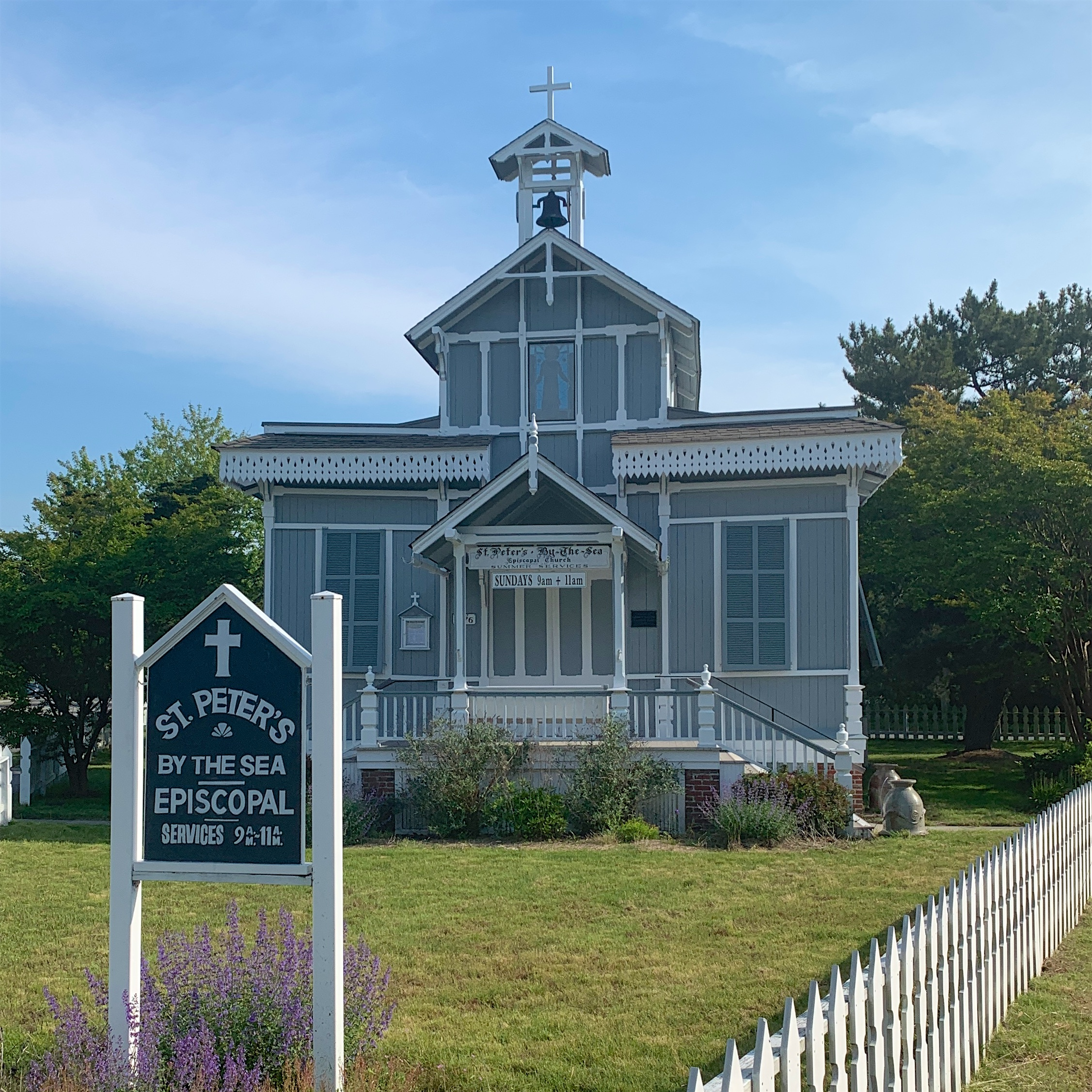
The Gingerbread Church

== See also ==
- National Register of Historic Places listings in Cape May County, New Jersey
- List of Episcopal churches in the United States
