= Cape May Point, New Jersey =

Borough in Cape May County, New Jersey, US

- Borough
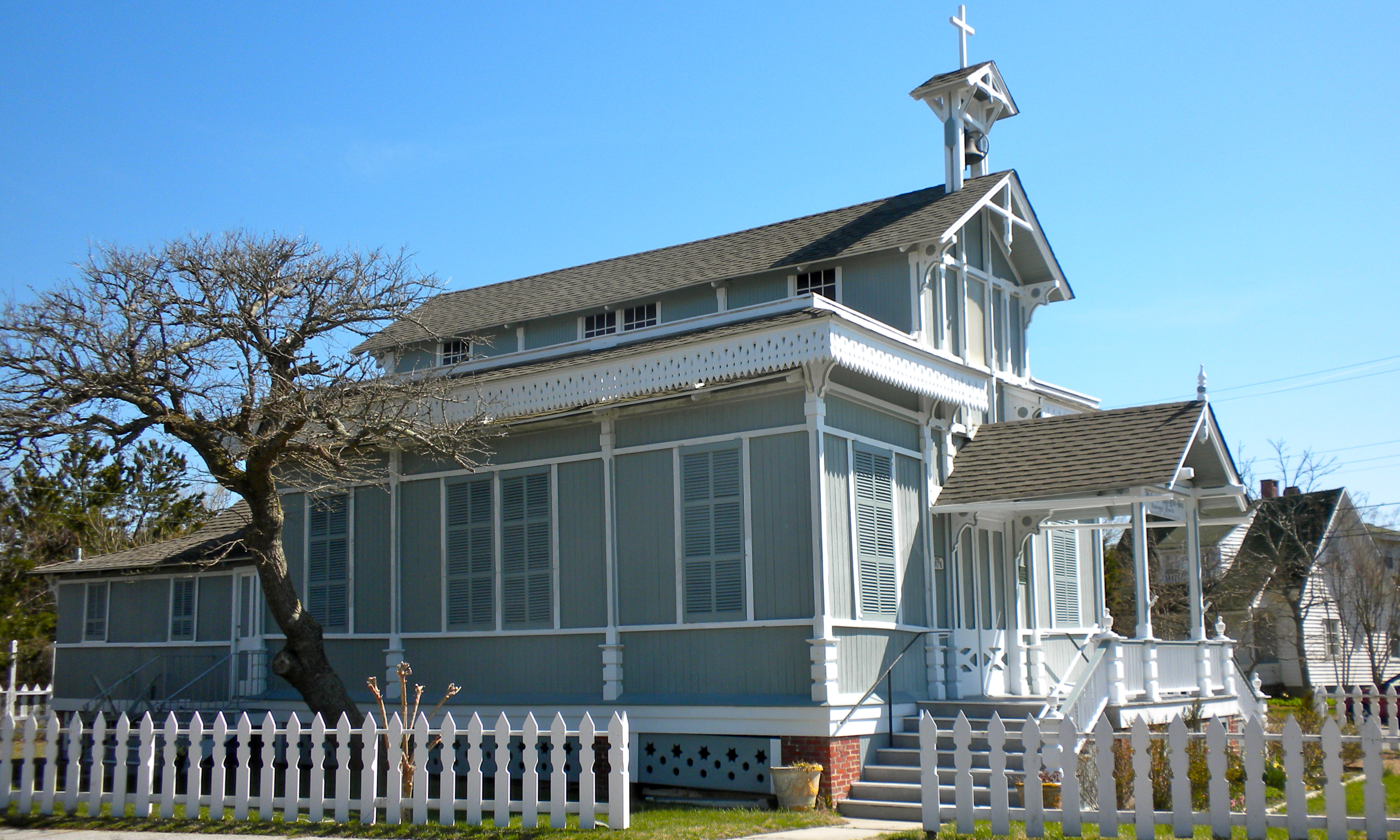
- Saint Peter's-By-The-Sea Episcopal Church

- Seal
- Interactive map of Cape May Point, New Jersey
- Location in Cape May County Location in New Jersey Location in the United States
- Coordinates: 38.936909°N 74.965374°W
- Country: United States
- State: New Jersey
- County: Cape May
- Incorporated: April 19, 1878
- Named after: Cape May / Cornelius Jacobsen May

Government
  - Type: Walsh Act
  - Body: Board of Commissioners
  - Mayor: Anita vanHeeswyk (term ends December 31, 2028)
  - Administrator: Ed Grant
  - Municipal clerk: Elaine L. Wallace

Area
  - Total: 0.31 sq mi (0.81 km^{2})
  - Land: 0.29 sq mi (0.76 km^{2})
  - Water: 0.019 sq mi (0.05 km^{2}) 5.81%
  - Rank: 553rd of 565 in state 16th of 16 in county
- Elevation: 7 ft (2.1 m)

Population (2020)
  - Total: 305
  - Estimate (2023): 299
  - Rank: 560th of 565 in state 16th of 16 in county
  - Density: 1,034/sq mi (399/km^{2})
  - Rank: 380th of 565 in state 7th of 16 in county
- Time zone: UTC−05:00 (Eastern (EST))
  - Summer (DST): UTC−04:00 (Eastern (EDT))
- ZIP Code: 08212
- Area code: 609 exchanges: 884, 898
- FIPS code: 3400910330
- GNIS feature ID: 0885179
- Website: www.capemaypoint.org

Cape May Point is a borough located at the tip of the Cape May Peninsula in Cape May County, in the U.S. state of New Jersey. The borough, and all of Cape May County, is part of the Ocean City metropolitan statistical area, and is part of the Philadelphia metropolitan area. As of the 2020 United States census, the borough's population was 305, an increase of 14 (+4.8%) from the 2010 census count of 291, which in turn reflected an increase of 50 (+20.7%) from the 241 counted in the 2000 census. The summer population can reach 4,500.

The Cape May Light is located in Lower Township, but is also a point of identity for Cape May Point as it uses the lighthouse as a logo for municipal-owned vehicles. Mayors of the two municipalities previously had a conflict over in which municipality it was located.

Cape May Point is a dry town, one of three municipalities in Cape May County where the sale of alcohol is prohibited by law. Cape May Point, Ocean City and Wildwood Crest are Cape May County's only remaining dry municipalities.

== History ==
Cape May Point was known as Stites Beach until 1876 when the name was changed to Seagrove. It was incorporated as a borough by an act of the New Jersey Legislature on April 19, 1878, from portions of Lower Township, following the results of a referendum held three days earlier. It was reincorporated on August 19, 1891 and then returned to Lower Township on April 8, 1896. Cape May Point re-emerged as an independent municipality on April 6, 1908, based on the results of a referendum held on April 21, 1908. The borough's name derives from Cape May, which was named for the 17th-century Dutch captain Cornelius Jacobsen May who explored and charted the area between 1611 and 1614, and established a claim for the province of New Netherland.

The remains of the World War I-era concrete ship SS Atlantus are located off the coast of Cape May Point, near Sunset Beach.

== Geography ==
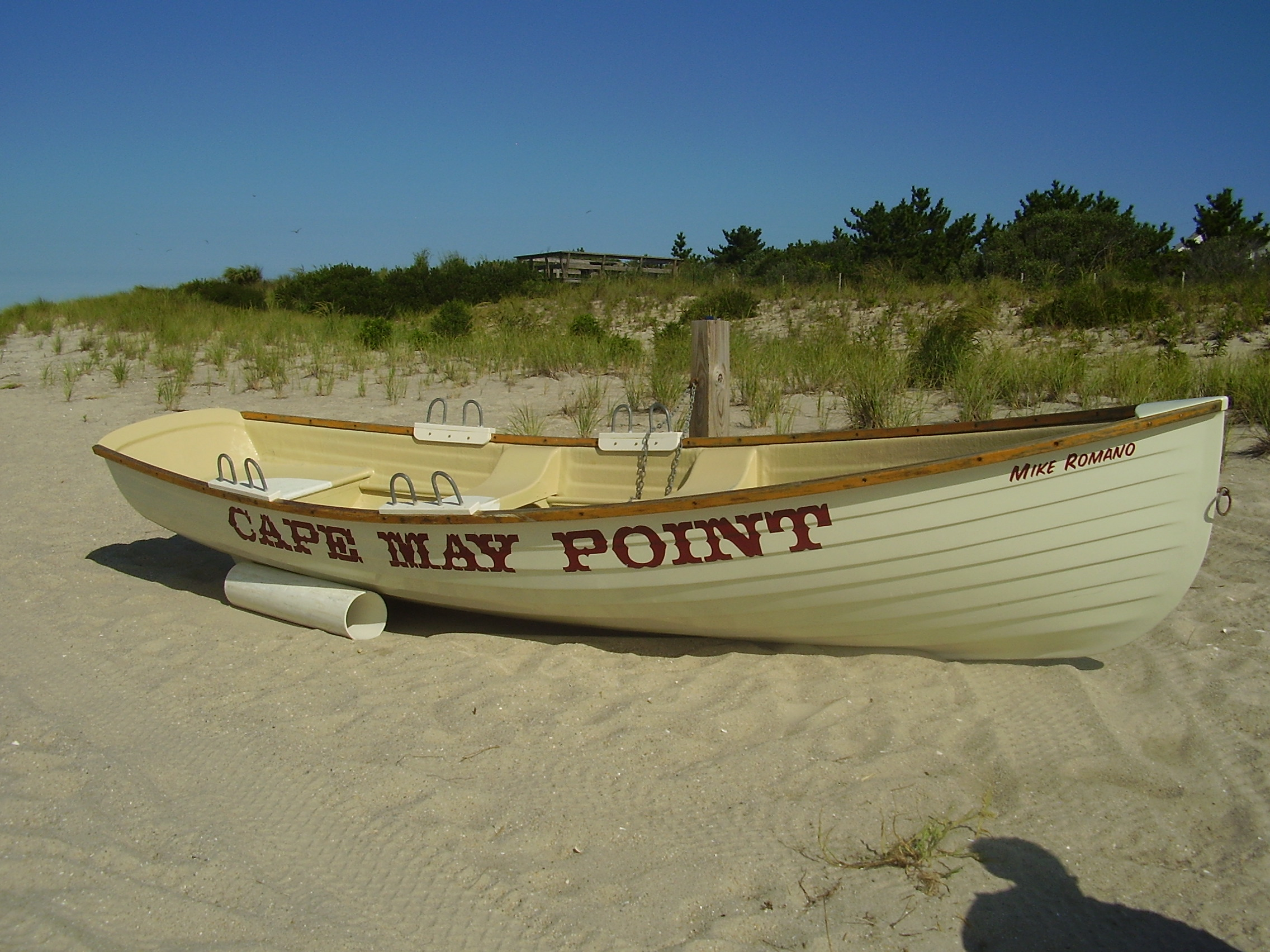
A boat marking the beach at Cape May Point

According to the United States Census Bureau, the borough had a total area of 0.31 square miles (0.81 km^{2}), including 0.30 square miles (0.76 km^{2}) of land and 0.02 square miles (0.05 km^{2}) of water (5.81%).

Cape May Point borders Lower Township, the Atlantic Ocean and Delaware Bay.

== Cityscape ==
In 2004, the borough had about 600 houses. Circa 2004 prices of housing increased, and in 2004 a four bedroom house typically had a price of $1 million.

In 2021 the median price of a house is $1,090,000, which was the highest of any municipality on Cape Island. Most houses are on 50 by 100 feet (15 by 30 m) lots and are below 2,100 square feet (200 m^{2}) in area due to the borough's zoning regulations. Julie Lasky of The New York Times wrote that "the houses appear relatively modest", and that the borough "lacks the fanciful architecture of Cape May".

In 2004 the only two businesses in Cape May Point were the Cape May Bird Observatory bird shop and the Cape May Point General Store.

== Demographics ==
Historical population
Census	Pop.	Note	%±
1880	198		—
1890	167		−15.7%
1900	153		−8.4%
1910	162		5.9%
1920	121		−25.3%
1930	104		−14.0%
1940	126		21.2%
1950	198		57.1%
1960	263		32.8%
1970	204		−22.4%
1980	255		25.0%
1990	248		−2.7%
2000	241		−2.8%
2010	291		20.7%
2020	305		4.8%
2023 (est.)	299	▼	−2.0%
Population sources:1880–2000 1880–1920 1880–1890; 1890-1910 1910–1930; 1940–2000; 2010 2020

=== 2010 census ===
The 2010 United States census counted 291 people, 164 households, and 100 families in the borough. The population density was 984.5 per square mile (380.1/km^{2}). There were 619 housing units at an average density of 2,094.2 per square mile (808.6/km^{2}). The racial makeup was 94.50% (275) White, 2.75% (8) Black or African American, 0.00% (0) Native American, 0.34% (1) Asian, 0.00% (0) Pacific Islander, 0.34% (1) from other races, and 2.06% (6) from two or more races. Hispanic or Latino of any race were 0.34% (1) of the population.

Of the 164 households, 4.3% had children under the age of 18; 55.5% were married couples living together; 3.7% had a female householder with no husband present and 39.0% were non-families. Of all households, 34.1% were made up of individuals and 20.7% had someone living alone who was 65 years of age or older. The average household size was 1.77 and the average family size was 2.17.

4.1% of the population were under the age of 18, 1.7% from 18 to 24, 3.8% from 25 to 44, 34.7% from 45 to 64, and 55.7% who were 65 years of age or older. The median age was 66.4 years. For every 100 females, the population had 84.2 males. For every 100 females ages 18 and older there were 83.6 males.

The Census Bureau's 2006–2010 American Community Survey showed that (in 2010 inflation-adjusted dollars) median household income was $51,250 (with a margin of error of +/− $36,659) and the median family income was $71,875 (+/− $10,854). Males had a median income of $108,125 (+/− $225,840) versus $ (+/− $) for females. The per capita income for the borough was $37,269 (+/− $13,473). About 8.7% of families and 9.4% of the population were below the poverty line, including none of those under age 18 and 12.7% of those age 65 or over.

=== 2000 census ===
As of the 2000 United States census there were 241 people, 133 households, and 77 families residing in the borough. The population density was 819.4 inhabitants per square mile (316.4/km^{2}). There were 501 housing units at an average density of 1,703.4 per square mile (657.7/km^{2}). The racial makeup of the borough was 95.02% White, 2.07% African American, 0.41% Asian, and 2.49% from two or more races. Hispanic or Latino of any race were 1.66% of the population.

There were 133 households, out of which 6.8% had children under the age of 18 living with them, 54.1% were married couples living together, 3.8% had a female householder with no husband present, and 41.4% were non-families. 35.3% of all households were made up of individuals, and 23.3% had someone living alone who was 65 years of age or older. The average household size was 1.81 and the average family size was 2.27.

In the borough the population was spread out, with 6.6% under the age of 18, 0.8% from 18 to 24, 10.4% from 25 to 44, 34.4% from 45 to 64, and 47.7% who were 65 years of age or older. The median age was 64 years. For every 100 females, there were 95.9 males. For every 100 females age 18 and over, there were 89.1 males.

The median income for a household in the borough was $55,313, and the median income for a family was $69,750. Males had a median income of $63,250 versus $30,833 for females. The per capita income for the borough was $52,689. None of the families and 1.7% of the population were living below the poverty line.

== Government ==
=== Local government ===
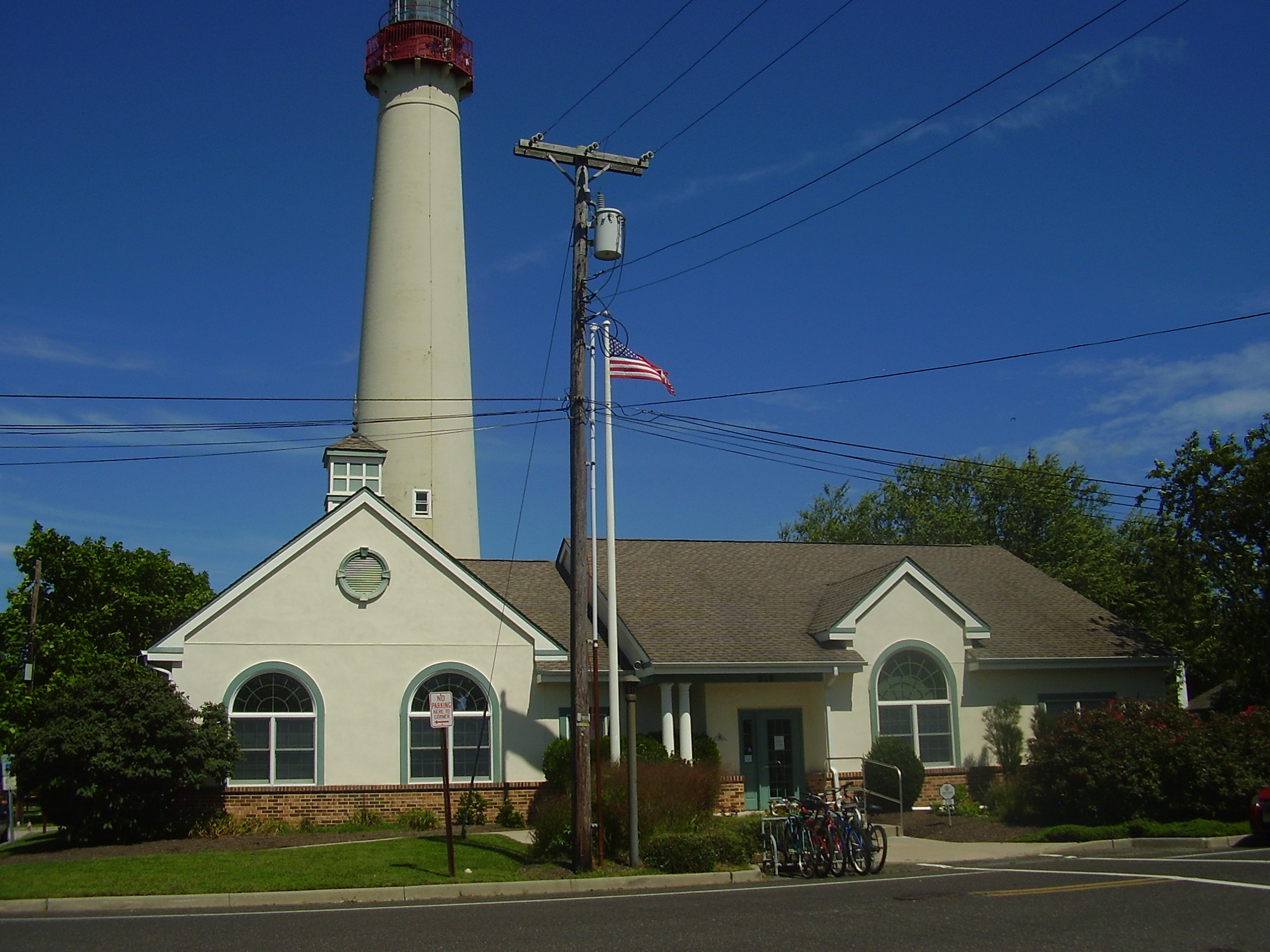
Municipal building

Cape May Point operates under the Walsh Act commission form of government, first created to rebuild the city of Galveston, Texas after the devastating Hurricane of 1900. Cape May Point is one of 30 (of the 564) municipalities statewide to use this form of government, most in shore communities, down from a peak of 60 early in the 20th century. In three-member Commissions, as in Cape May Point, the Departments of Public Affairs and Public Safety are combined, as are the Departments of Public Works and Parks and Public Property. Revenue and Finance is the third portfolio. The borough adopted this form of government in 1916. The governing body is comprised of three commissioners, who are elected at-large on a non-partisan basis in the November general election to serve concurrent four-year terms of office. Cape May Point shifted its municipal elections from May to November, extending the term-end dates from June 30 to December 31 for the commissioners elected in 2012. The Commissioners exercise complete control of the operation of the borough, with each Commissioner having all aspects of Administrative, Executive, Judicial, and Legislative powers over their department. The three Commissioners choose a mayor from among themselves at a reorganization meeting following each election, with the mayor responsible for leading municipal meetings and general oversight of community affairs.

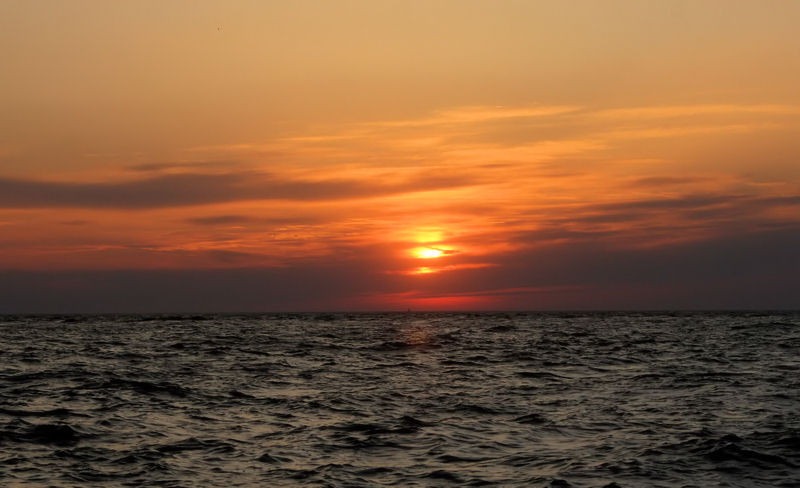
Sunset at Sunset Beach, just outside Cape May Point in Lower Township

As of 2025, the members of the Board of Commissioners of Cape May Point are Mayor Anita vanHeeswyk (Commissioner of Revenue and Finance), Deputy Mayor Elise Geiger (Commissioner of Public Affairs and Public Safety) and Suzanne Yunghans (Commissioner of Public Works, Parks and Public Property), all serving concurrent terms of office ending December 31, 2028.

=== Federal, state and county representation ===
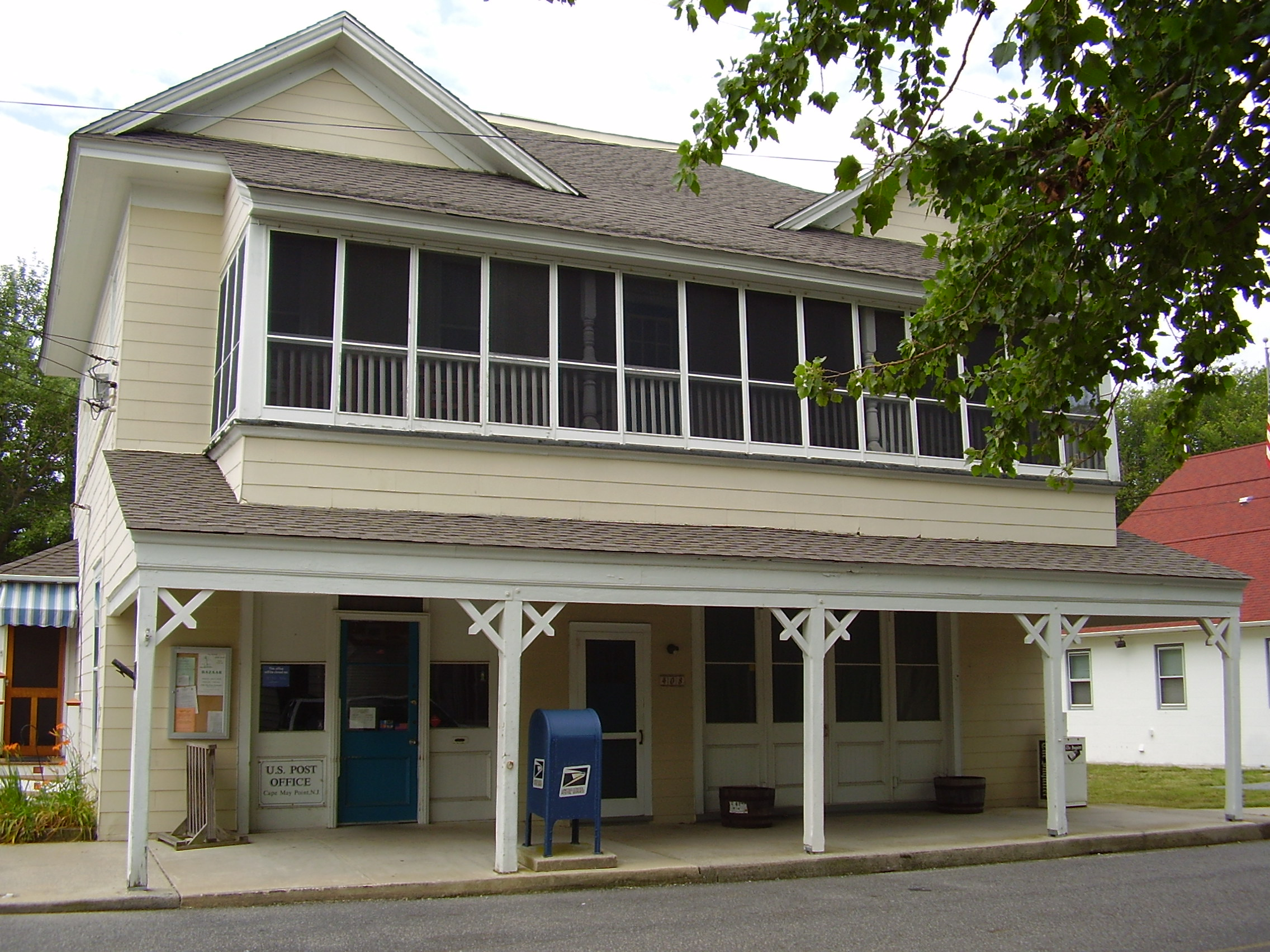
Cape May Point Post Office

Cape May Point is located in the 2nd Congressional District and is part of New Jersey's 1st state legislative district.

For the 119th United States Congress, New Jersey's 2nd congressional district is represented by Jeff Van Drew (R, Dennis Township). New Jersey is represented in the United States Senate by Democrats Cory Booker (Newark, term ends 2027) and Andy Kim (Moorestown, term ends 2031).

For the 2026–2027 session, the 1st legislative district of the New Jersey Legislature is represented in the State Senate by Mike Testa (R, Vineland) and in the General Assembly by Antwan McClellan (R, Ocean City) and Erik K. Simonsen (R, Lower Township).

Cape May County is governed by a five-person Board of County Commissioners whose members are elected at-large on a partisan basis to three-year terms of office on a staggered basis, with either one or two seats coming up for election each year; At an annual reorganization held each January, the commissioners select one member to serve as director and another to serve as vice-director. As of 2026, Cape May County's Commissioners are Director Leonard C. Desiderio (R, Sea Isle City, term as commissioner ends December 31, 2027; term as director ends 2026), Vice-Director Andrew Bulakowski (R, Lower Township; term as commissioner ends 2028; term as vice-director ends 2026). Robert Barr (R, Ocean City; 2028) and Will Morey (R, Wildwood Crest; 2026), with one seat expiring in December 2026 vacant after Melanie Collette resigned from office in March 2026. The county's constitutional officers are Clerk Rita Marie Rothberg (R, Ocean City; 2030), Sheriff Robert Nolan (R, Lower Township; 2026) and Surrogate E. Marie Hayes (R, Ocean City; 2028).

=== Politics ===
As of March 2011, there were a total of 212 registered voters in Cape May Point, of which 99 (46.7%) were registered as Republicans, 63 (29.7%) were registered as Democrats, and 50 (23.6%) were registered as Unaffiliated. There were no voters registered to other parties.

Gubernatorial election results for Cape May Point
Year	Republican		Democratic		Third party(ies)	
Year	No.	%	No.	%	No.	%
2025	37	25.69%	107	74.31%	0	0.00%
2021	50	33.11%	101	66.89%	0	0.00%
2017	49	39.84%	74	60.16%	0	0.00%
2013	89	67.94%	39	29.77%	3	2.29%
2009	79	47.02%	73	43.45%	16	9.52%
2005	73	43.45%	89	52.98%	6	3.57%

In the 2012 presidential election, Democrat Barack Obama received 52.0% of the vote (91 cast), ahead of Republican Mitt Romney with 47.4% (83 votes), and other candidates with 0.6% (1 vote), among the 176 ballots cast by the borough's 225 registered voters (1 ballot was spoiled), for a turnout of 78.2%. In the 2008 presidential election, Democrat Barack Obama received 53.9% of the vote (103 cast), ahead of Republican John McCain, who received 44.5% (85 votes), with 191 ballots cast among the borough's 203 registered voters, for a turnout of 94.1%. In the 2004 presidential election, Democrat John Kerry received 53.3% of the vote (114 ballots cast), outpolling Republican George W. Bush, who received around 45.8% (98 votes), with 214 ballots cast among the borough's 237 registered voters, for a turnout percentage of 90.3.

Presidential elections results
Year	Republican	Democratic
2024	28.9% 48	68.7% 114
2020	36.9% 66	61.5% 110
2016	41.9% 62	52.7% 78
2012	47.4% 83	52.0% 91
2008	44.5% 85	53.9% 103
2004	45.8% 98	53.3% 114

In the 2013 gubernatorial election, Republican Chris Christie received 66.9% of the vote (85 cast), ahead of Democrat Barbara Buono with 30.7% (39 votes), and other candidates with 2.4% (3 votes), among the 129 ballots cast by the borough's 209 registered voters (2 ballots were spoiled), for a turnout of 61.7%. In the 2009 gubernatorial election, Republican Chris Christie received 47.0% of the vote (79 ballots cast), ahead of both Democrat Jon Corzine with 43.5% (73 votes) and Independent Chris Daggett with 9.5% (16 votes), with 168 ballots cast among the borough's 220 registered voters, yielding a 76.4% turnout.

United States Senate election results for Cape May Point1
Year	Republican		Democratic		Third party(ies)	
Year	No.	%	No.	%	No.	%
2024	56	34.57%	106	65.43%	0	0.00%
2018	55	40.15%	74	54.01%	8	5.84%
2012	82	47.67%	88	51.16%	2	1.16%
2006	86	48.59%	89	50.28%	2	1.13%

United States Senate election results for Cape May Point2
Year	Republican		Democratic		Third party(ies)	
Year	No.	%	No.	%	No.	%
2020	63	36.63%	108	62.79%	1	0.58%
2014	48	38.40%	77	61.60%	0	0.00%
2013	46	42.20%	60	55.05%	3	2.75%
2008	80	45.20%	94	53.11%	3	1.69%

== Law enforcement and public safety ==
Cape May Point Volunteer Fire Department provides fire department services. The spring 1908 Lankenau Villa fire prompted Cape May Point officials to ask for a fire department to be organized the following July, and the borough had two fire carts by 1911. In 1923 a borough ordinance allowed for the creation of the Cape May Point Volunteer Fire Department, with a truck and fire station acquired and established, respectively, in 1924.

From the establishment of Cape May Point borough it had an independent police department using ordinary residents filling in as "special" police instead of salaried police, although eventually its police department was reformed into a standard one. Cape May Point began contracting with West Cape May Police in 1986. Cape May Point ended the arrangement in 2001, which contributed to West Cape May disbanding its police department, about 40 percent of which had been paid for by Cape May Point. The two boroughs then contracted with Cape May City to provide law enforcement for both, effective upon the dissolution of the West Cape May Police on January 1, 2002. The three-municipality law enforcement arrangement, which had been discussed for over 25 years, was the first of its kind in New Jersey and proved popular.

Cape May Point, upon incorporation, had a one-room jail. Joe Jordan, author of Cape May Point, The Illustrated History-1875 to the Present, stated that "if one is to believe local gossip" that the jail likely served as a drunk tank, and Jordan wrote that it "may have held several world's records as the smallest jail, with the fewest inmates, and the shortest periods of incarceration." The borough put the facility for sale in 1927 but rejected the sole bid and turned it into storage for the fire department after moving it behind the current fire station location. It was moved to Historic Cold Spring Village in Cold Spring in 1983.

== Infrastructure ==
Cape May Point began using Cape May City's water system c. 1970s as Cape May Point's well water system was near the maximum salt content allowed under New Jersey law. The water distribution system was rebuilt in the 1980s and 1990s, and a new water tank replaced the previous one in 1995, with the former water tank dismantled. Its water costs increased when Cape May City built a desalinization plant in the late 1990s.

The Cape May Point Water and Sewer Utility, created in 1980, is an agency that is separate from the Cape May Point borough government. A sewage treatment plant opened in 1938, but it put untreated sewage into the water, so Cape May Point agreed to use Cape May City sewage facilities after the New Jersey Department of Health in October 1941 demanded that Cape May Point change its practices with a fine as possible punishment. Cape May Point also helped pay for a new sewage plant Cape May City opened c. 1960–1961.

== Education ==
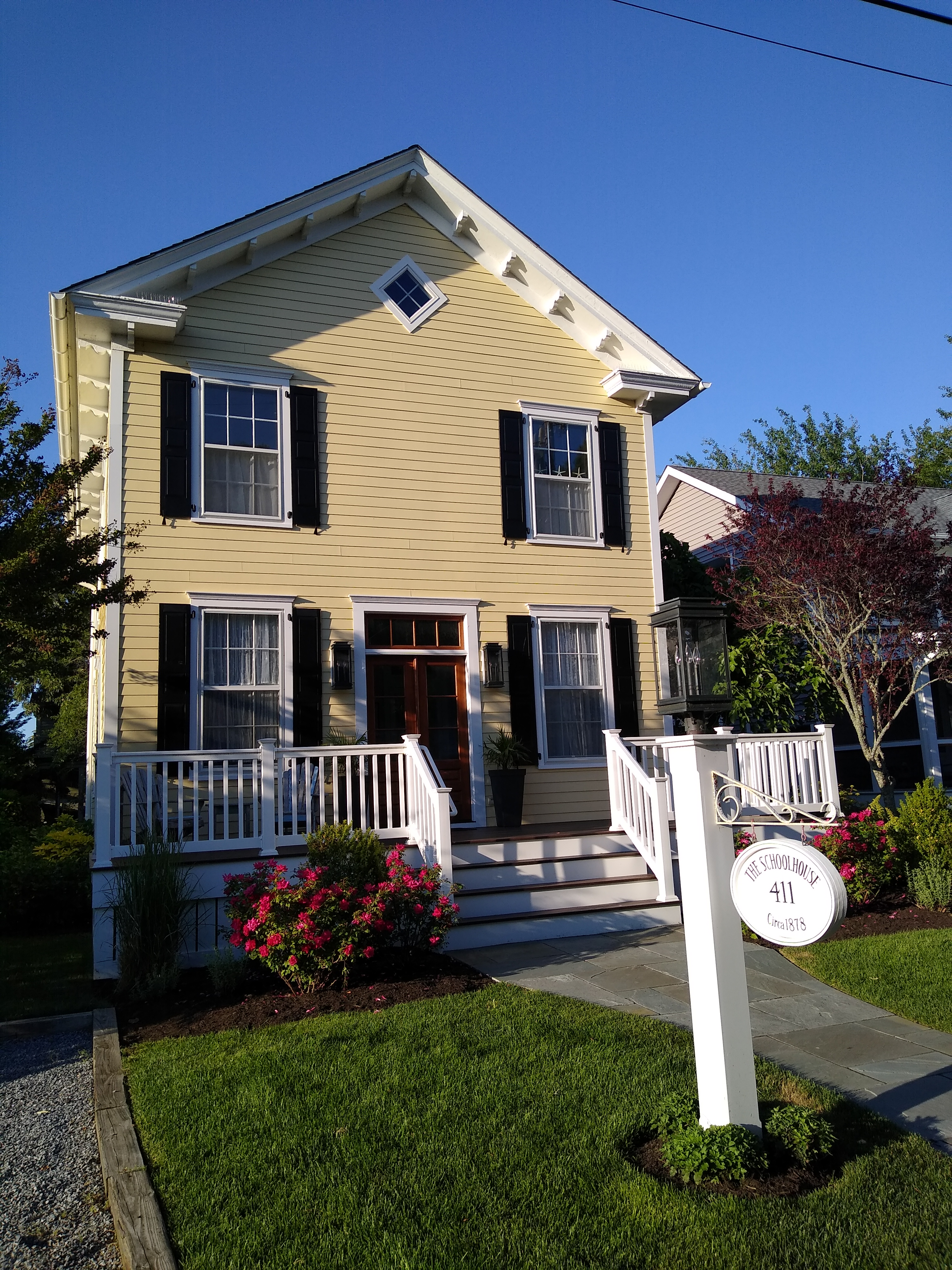
The Schoolhouse, a house, was formerly the Cape May Point school

Cape May Point School District is a non-operating school district, with all students sent to schools outside of the district. It opened a two story grade 1–8 school in the 1870. It began sending students to Lower Township School District in 1931 and closed the former school, which is now a house. Cape May Point under Frank Rutherford, the mayor, chose not to join the Lower Cape May Regional School District when it was formed. The borough never joined a regional school system. Therefore, in 2004, it had among the lowest property tax rates in New Jersey.

For pre-kindergarten through sixth grade, public school students attend Cape May City Elementary School in Cape May City, as part of a sending/receiving relationship with the Cape May City School District. Most students in the Cape May elementary district come from the United States Coast Guard Training Center Cape May. As of the 2021–22 school year, the district, comprised of one school, had an enrollment of 169 students and 22.6 classroom teachers (on an FTE basis), for a student–teacher ratio of 7.5:1. Starting in 2010, discussions were under way regarding a possible consolidation of the districts of Cape May City, Cape May Point and the West Cape May School District.

For seventh through twelfth grades, public school students attend the schools of the Lower Cape May Regional School District as part of a sending/receiving relationship; the district also serves students from the constituent communities of Cape May City, Lower Township and West Cape May. Schools in the district (with 2022–23 enrollment data from the National Center for Education Statistics) are Richard M. Teitelman Middle School with 433 students in grades 7-8 and Lower Cape May Regional High School (LCMRHS) with 757 students in grades 9-12.

Students are also eligible to attend Cape May County Technical High School in Cape May Court House, which serves students from the entire county in its comprehensive and vocational programs, which are offered without charge to students who are county residents. Special needs students may be referred to Cape May County Special Services School District in the Cape May Court House area.

== Transportation ==
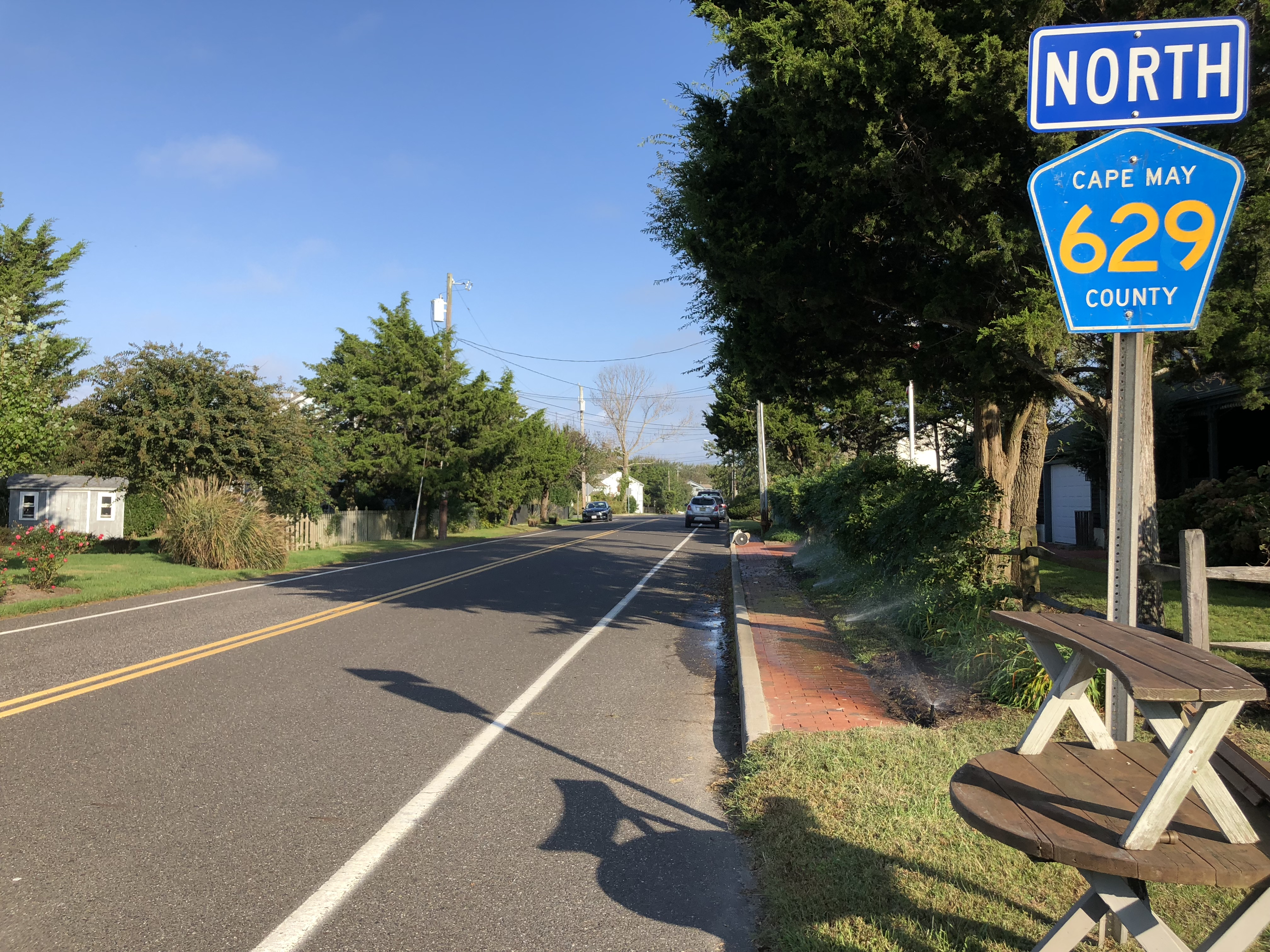
County Route 629 in Cape May Point

As of May 2010, the borough had a total of 7.39 miles (11.89 km) of roadways, of which 5.52 miles (8.88 km) were maintained by the municipality and 1.87 miles (3.01 km) by Cape May County.

No Interstate, U.S., state or major county highways serve Cape May Point. The most significant roads in the borough are minor county routes, such as County Route 629.

== Climate ==
According to the Köppen climate classification system, Cape May Point has a humid subtropical climate (Cfa) with hot, moderately humid summers, cool winters and year-around precipitation. Cfa climates are characterized by all months having an average mean temperature above 32.0 °F (0.0 °C), at least four months with an average mean temperature at or above 50.0 °F (10.0 °C), at least one month with an average mean temperature at or above 71.6 °F (22.0 °C) and no significant precipitation difference between seasons. During the summer months in Cape May Point, a cooling afternoon sea breeze is present on most days, but episodes of extreme heat and humidity can occur with heat index values at or above 95.0 °F (35.0 °C). During the winter months, episodes of extreme cold and wind can occur with wind chill values below 0.0 °F (−17.8 °C). The plant hardiness zone at Cape May Point Beach is 7b with an average annual extreme minimum air temperature of 8.1 °F (−13.3 °C). The average seasonal (November–April) snowfall total is around 12 inches (30 cm), and the average snowiest month is February which corresponds with the annual peak in nor'easter activity.

Climate data for Cape May Point Beach, NJ (1981–2010 Averages)
Month	Jan	Feb	Mar	Apr	May	Jun	Jul	Aug	Sep	Oct	Nov	Dec	Year
Mean daily maximum °F (°C)	41.9 (5.5)	43.7 (6.5)	50.4 (10.2)	59.4 (15.2)	68.6 (20.3)	77.7 (25.4)	82.0 (27.8)	81.1 (27.3)	75.8 (24.3)	66.1 (18.9)	56.3 (13.5)	46.7 (8.2)	62.6 (17.0)
Daily mean °F (°C)	35.3 (1.8)	37.0 (2.8)	43.3 (6.3)	52.3 (11.3)	61.4 (16.3)	70.8 (21.6)	75.6 (24.2)	74.9 (23.8)	69.5 (20.8)	59.1 (15.1)	49.7 (9.8)	40.2 (4.6)	55.8 (13.2)
Mean daily minimum °F (°C)	28.6 (−1.9)	30.2 (−1.0)	36.3 (2.4)	45.3 (7.4)	54.2 (12.3)	63.8 (17.7)	69.1 (20.6)	68.6 (20.3)	63.1 (17.3)	52.2 (11.2)	43.0 (6.1)	33.8 (1.0)	49.1 (9.5)
Average precipitation inches (mm)	3.36 (85)	2.80 (71)	4.16 (106)	3.64 (92)	3.63 (92)	3.19 (81)	3.79 (96)	4.07 (103)	3.24 (82)	3.62 (92)	3.23 (82)	3.61 (92)	42.34 (1,075)
Average relative humidity (%)	68.9	67.7	66.0	64.5	68.9	73.0	72.9	75.4	72.1	71.0	69.7	69.4	70.0
Average dew point °F (°C)	26.1 (−3.3)	27.3 (−2.6)	32.7 (0.4)	40.7 (4.8)	51.1 (10.6)	61.7 (16.5)	66.3 (19.1)	66.6 (19.2)	60.1 (15.6)	49.7 (9.8)	40.2 (4.6)	31.0 (−0.6)	46.2 (7.9)
Source: PRISM

Climate data for North Cape May, NJ Ocean Water Temperature (2 N Cape May Point)
Month	Jan	Feb	Mar	Apr	May	Jun	Jul	Aug	Sep	Oct	Nov	Dec	Year
Daily mean °F (°C)	37 (3)	37 (3)	42 (6)	50 (10)	59 (15)	68 (20)	73 (23)	74 (23)	72 (22)	61 (16)	52 (11)	42 (6)	56 (13)
Source: NOAA

== Ecology ==
According to the A. W. Kuchler U.S. potential natural vegetation types, Cape May Point would have a dominant vegetation type of Northern Cordgrass (73) with a dominant vegetation form of Coastal Prairie (20).

== Places of interest ==
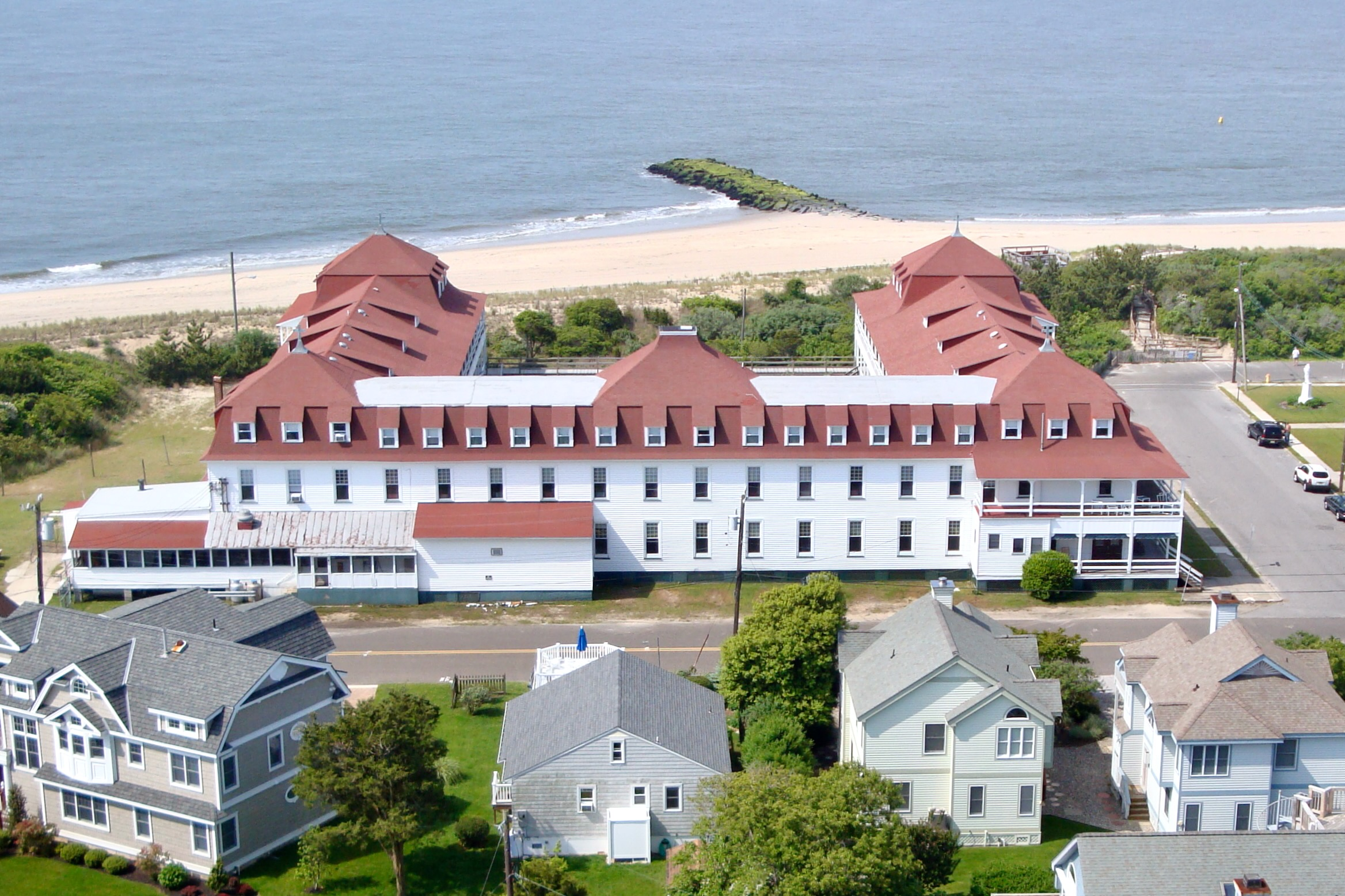
Saint Mary by-the-Sea Retreat House in 2009

The Sisters of St. Joseph maintained the Queen of the Sea facility, a convent called the Saint Joseph House, and a retreat facility called Saint Mary by-the-Sea. Bill Barlow of the Press of Atlantic City wrote that it is "A beloved local landmark". Its facilities are not connected with the Roman Catholic Diocese of Camden.

Saint Mary opened as the Shoreham Hotel in 1889. After the business failed, it became a nursing home for African Americans in 1898, known as Home for Aged and Infirm Colored People. It later closed, and the sisters spent $9,000 to buy the property in 1909, which it called Saint Mary. This building has a "U-shape" and 38,000 square feet (3,500 m^{2}) of space. In 2016 the sisters announced that they intended to close Saint Mary. The COVID-19 pandemic in New Jersey, starting in 2020, meant that the group could no longer hold retreats there, and in 2021 the order announced that Saint Mary was closing. The Cape May Point Science Center opened in June 2023 in the Saint Mary building that it had acquired the previous year for $5.5 million.

== Notable people ==
People who were born in, residents of, or otherwise closely associated with Cape May Point include:

- Benjamin Harrison (1833–1901), 23rd President of the United States from 1889 to 1893, who was given a cottage in Cape May Point in 1890 by John Wanamaker and his associates
- Mary O'Hara (1885–1980), author known for her novel My Friend Flicka
- Bill Pilczuk (born 1971), swimmer
- David Allen Sibley (born 1961), ornithologist who is the author and illustrator of The Sibley Guide to Birds
- John Wanamaker (1838–1922), retailer

== Gallery ==
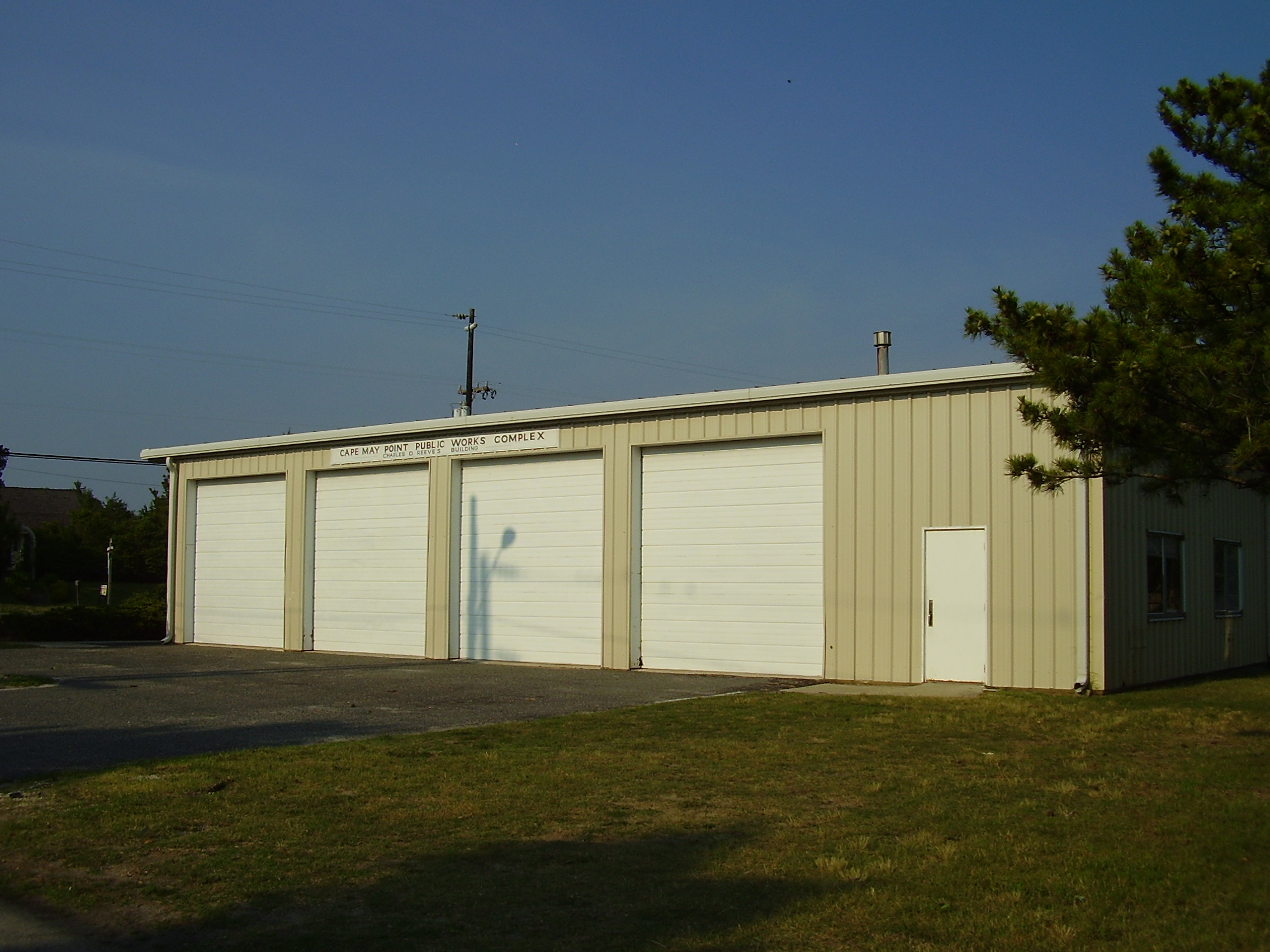
Cape May Point Public Works Complex

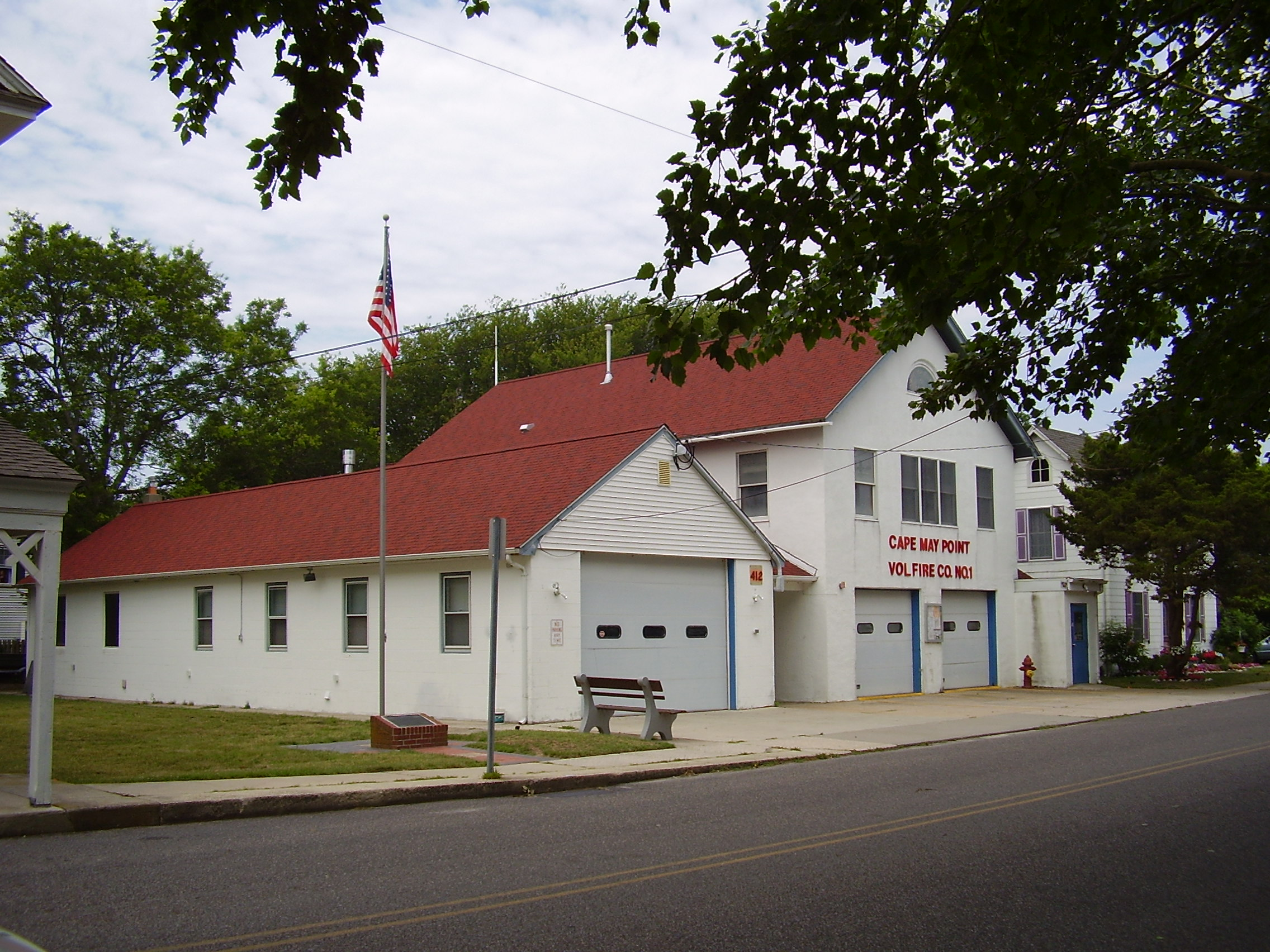
Cape May Point Volunteer Fire Company

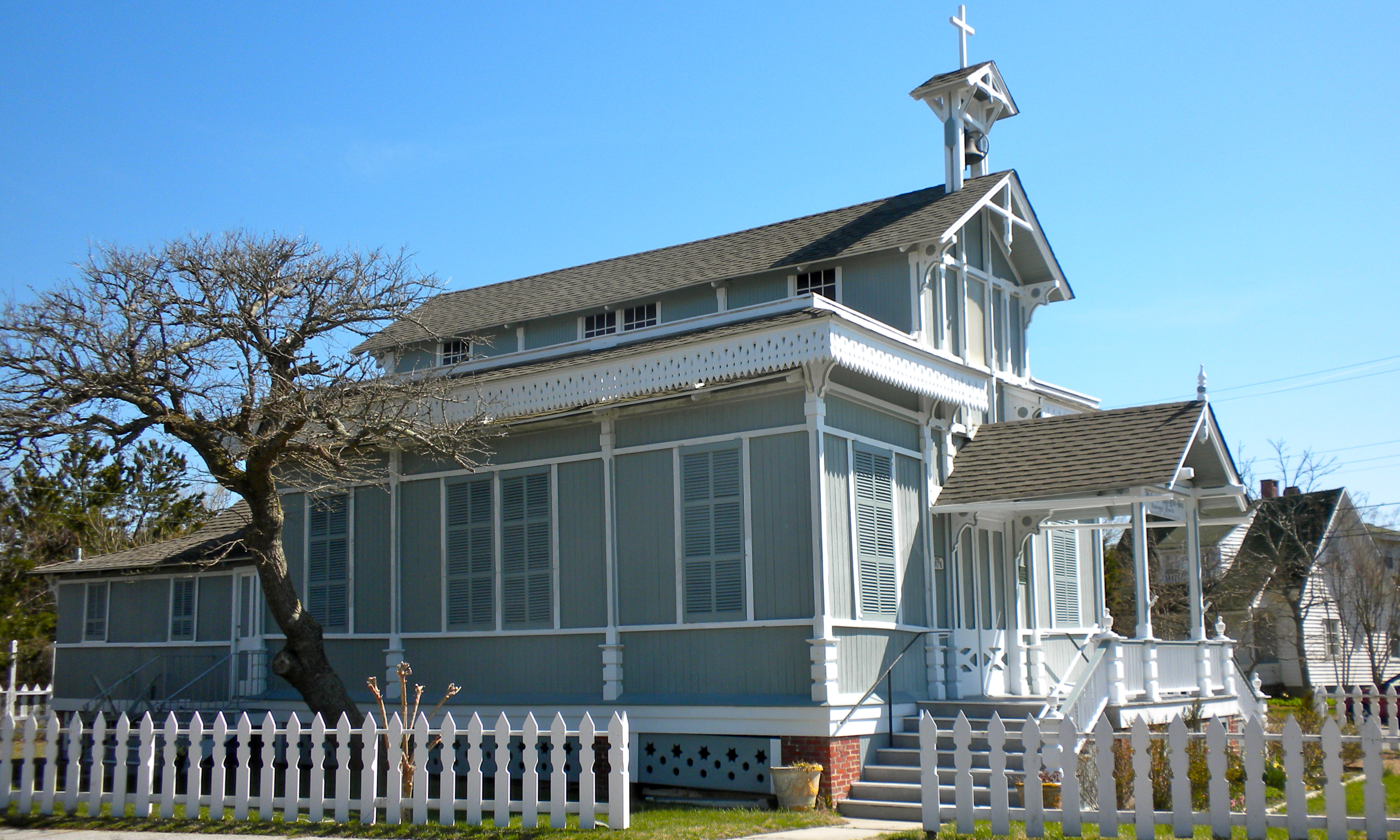
Saint Peter's-By-The-Sea Episcopal Church

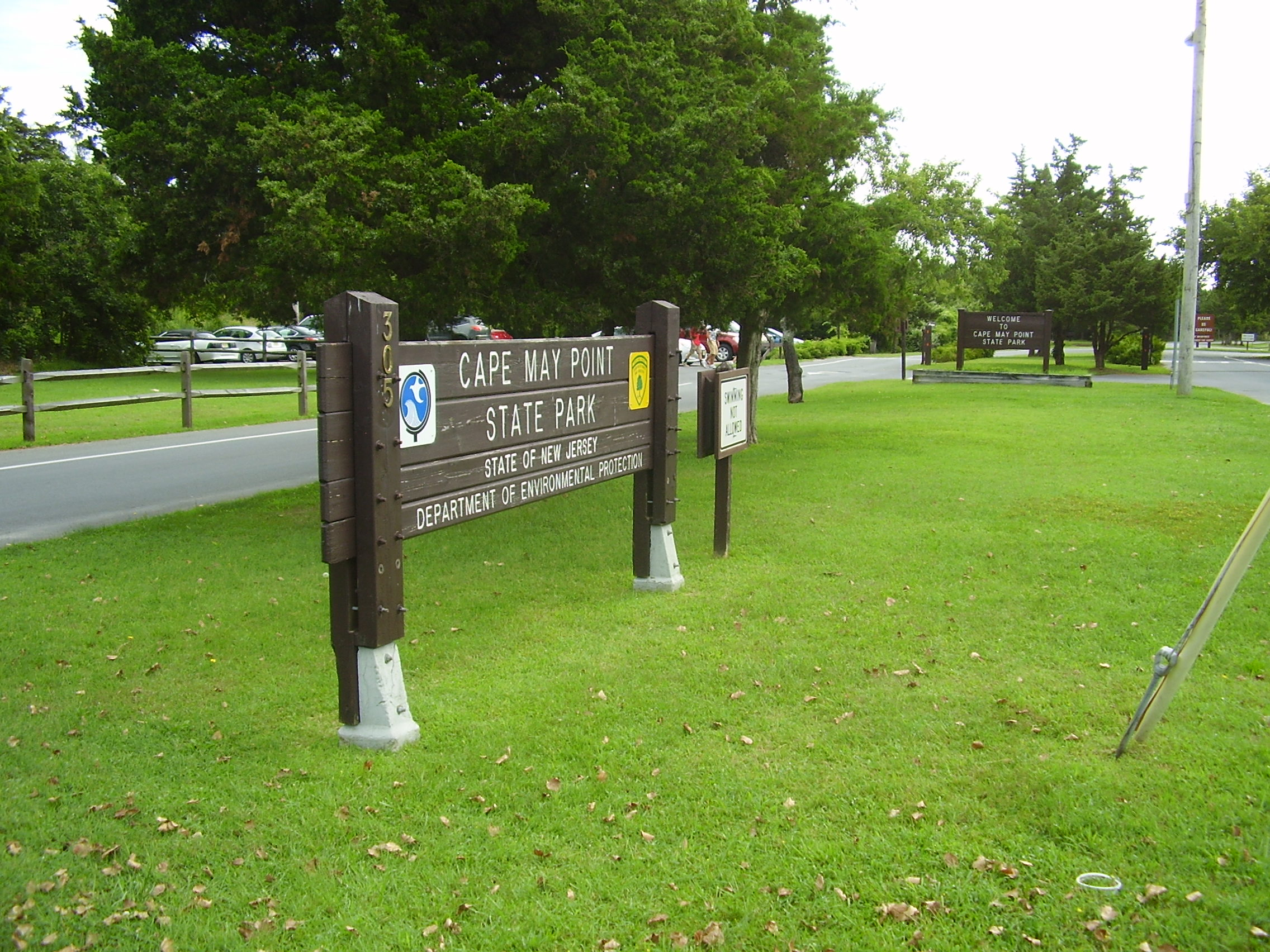
Cape May Point State Park (in Lower Township)
