= Sunset Beach (New Jersey) =

Beach in Cape May County, New Jersey

Coordinates: 38.9444°N 74.9705°W

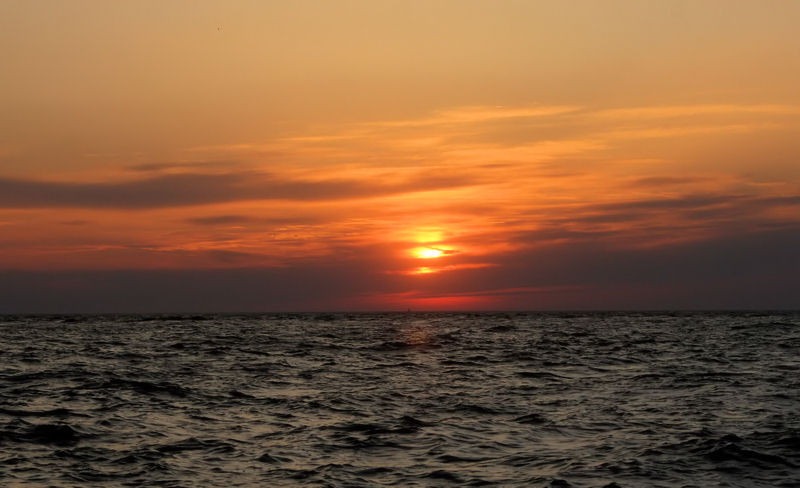
Sunset at Sunset Beach in May 2009

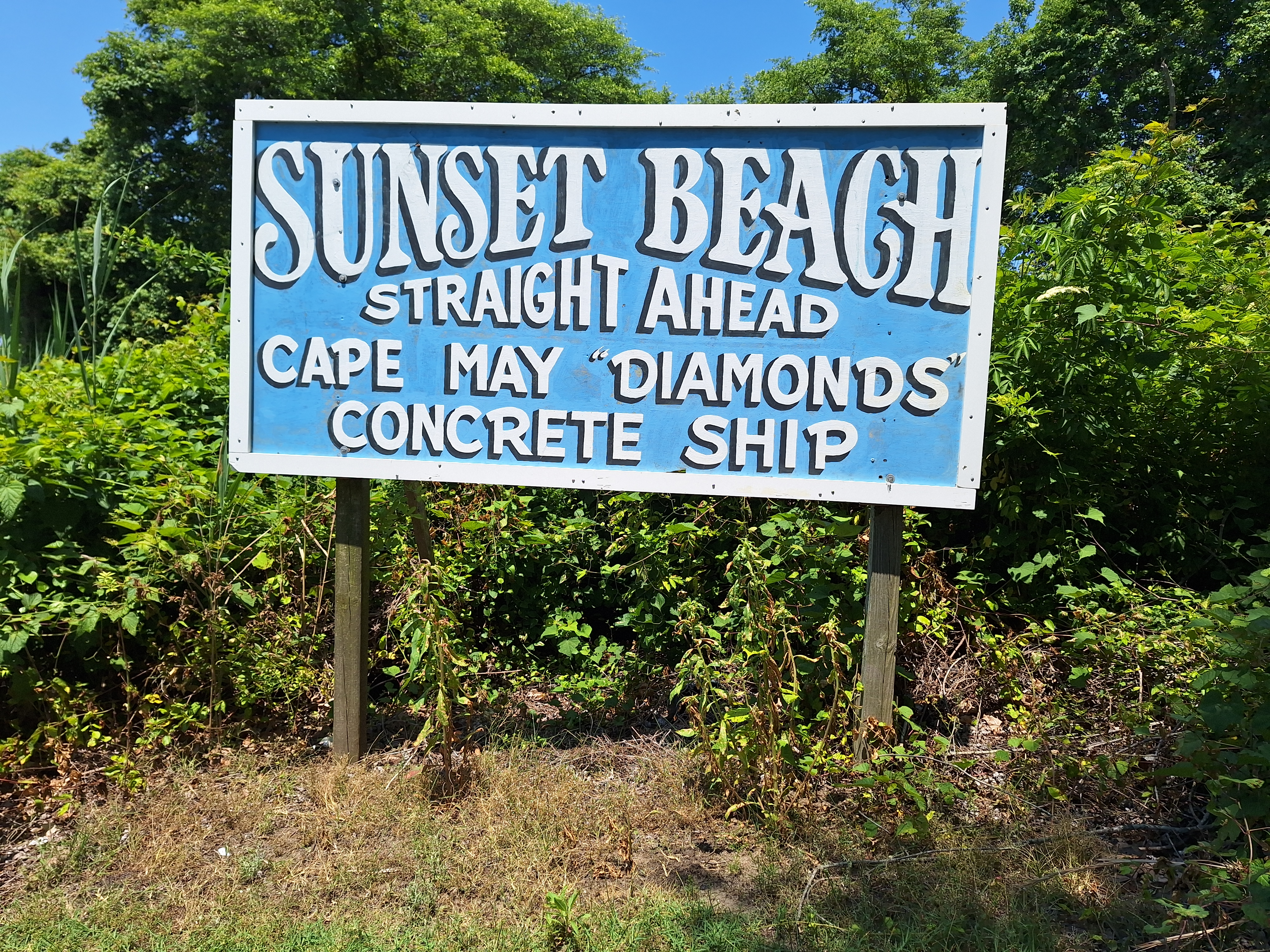
Sunset Beach sign

Sunset Beach is a beach located on the Cape May Peninsula, in Lower Township, New Jersey, near Cape May Point, along the Delaware Bay, in the U.S. state of New Jersey. It is a local tourist attraction due in part to its proximity to the SS Atlantus, also known as the Concrete Ship, and the Cape May Lighthouse.

== Attractions ==
Sunset Beach is known for a flag raising-lowering ceremony, which is held daily from Memorial Day weekend through August, and on Saturdays in September. All the flags flown in the ceremony are flags from the caskets of veterans. The ceremony has been taking place on Sunset beach since 1973. Other attractions include Cape May diamonds, clear quartz crystals that can be easily found along the beach's length; the SS Atlantus, a partially submerged concrete ship; summer fireworks.

== Ecology ==
Many whales are seen from May to December, while migratory birds are seen in the spring and fall. Monarch butterflies use Sunset Beach as a migratory stopover on their way to Mexico from Canada.
