= Memorial High School (Millville, New Jersey) =

High school in Cumberland County, New Jersey, United States

Location
- 504 East Broad Street; Millville, Cumberland County, New Jersey 08332; United States
- Coordinates: 39.4030°N 75.0322°W

Information
- Type: public high school
- School district: Millville Public Schools
- Principal: Stephanie DeRose
- Grades: 9-10
- Team name: Thunderbolts
- Newspaper: Memorial Voice
- Website: mhs.millville.org

Memorial High School was a comprehensive public high school in Millville in Cumberland County, in the U.S. state of New Jersey, that operated as part of the Millville Public Schools. The school was built in 1925 and used as the Millville High School from 1925-1964 until the Millville Senior High School was built. The school had been used as a Junior High School to house the ninth grade and half of the tenth grade until the new Millville High School was completed.

Maurice River Township students attend the district's high schools, as part of a sending/receiving relationship with the Maurice River Township School District. Commercial Township and Lawrence Township also send students to the district's high schools; students from Woodbine previously attended the district's high schools as part of a sending/receiving relationship. The four sending districts filed suit in 2009, challenging the way in which the Millville district charges for students from outside the district to attend the school.

== History ==
The school was constructed as a memorial to soldiers killed in World War I; there were 20 Millville residents who died during their service during the war. A bronze plaque next to the school's auditorium states that the school was "Dedicated in Memory of the Men from Millville who made the Supreme Sacrifice in the World War.".

Millville High School is the home of the Millville Thunderbolts.

In 2016 the school board decided to create a single principal position for all high school students as it had plans to consolidate the two high schools.

As part of a $145 million expansion and update project overseen by the New Jersey Schools Development Authority and scheduled to start in 2017, the capacity of Millville High will be doubled to accommodate up to 2,300 students, allowing all freshmen and sophomore classes that had been at Memorial High School to be consolidated at the Senior High School building. All phases of construction at the new Millville High School were completed by September 2023.
