= Cape-Atlantic League =

US high school athletic conference

The Cape-Atlantic League (CAL) is an athletic conference consisting of both public high schools and non-public high schools located in Atlantic County, Cape May County, Cumberland County, and Gloucester County, New Jersey. The Cape-Atlantic League operates under the aegis of the New Jersey State Interscholastic Athletic Association. It was first established in 1949, and today it comprises twenty-two schools, divided into anywhere from one to four divisions, depending on sport. All schools that sponsor a football program are members of the West Jersey Football League.

== History ==
Hammonton High School, which was one of the conference's original members when it was established in 1949, had been a member of the Tri-County Conference from 2014 to 2020, before returning to the Cape-Atlantic League for the 2020-21 school year.

== Participating schools ==
School	Location	School district	Team name	Classification	Colors
Absegami High School	Galloway Township	Greater Egg Harbor Regional High School District	Braves	South III	Brown and Vegas Gold
Atlantic City High School	Atlantic City	Atlantic City School District	Vikings	South IV	Navy and White
Atlantic County Institute of Technology	Hamilton Township	Atlantic County Vocational School District	Red Hawks	South IV	Black Cardinal Gold
Bridgeton High School	Bridgeton	Bridgeton Public Schools	Bulldogs	South II	Maroon and White
Buena Regional High School	Buena	Buena Regional School District	Chiefs	South II	Blue and Gold
Cape May County Technical High School	Middle Township	Cape May County Technical School District	Hawks	South II	Green and White
Cedar Creek High School	Egg Harbor City	Greater Egg Harbor Regional High School District	Pirates	South II	Forest Green and Maroon
Egg Harbor Township High School	Egg Harbor Township	Egg Harbor Township Schools	Eagles	South IV	Black and Silver
Hammonton High School	Hammonton	Hammonton Public Schools	Blue Devils	Group IV	Blue and White
Holy Spirit High School	Absecon	Roman Catholic Diocese of Camden	Spartans	Non-Public B	Navy and Vegas Gold
Lower Cape May Regional High School	Lower Township	Lower Cape May Regional School District	Caper Tigers	South II	Columbia blue and Black
Mainland Regional High School	Linwood	Mainland Regional High School District	Mustangs	South III	Kelly green and White
Middle Township High School	Middle Township	Middle Township Public Schools	Panthers	South II	Black and Orange
Millville High School	Millville	Millville Public Schools	Thunderbolts	South IV	Blue and Orange
Oakcrest High School	Hamilton Township	Greater Egg Harbor Regional High School District	Falcons	South III	Blue and Gray
Ocean City High School	Ocean City	Ocean City School District	Red Raiders	South III	Red and White
Our Lady of Mercy Academy	Newfield	Private	Villagers	Non-Public B	Green and Gold
Pleasantville High School	Pleasantville	Pleasantville Public Schools	Greyhounds	South II	Maroon and White
St. Augustine College Preparatory School	Buena Vista Township	Private	Hermits	Non-Public A	Navy and Gray
St. Joseph Academy	Hammonton	Private	Wildcats	Non-Public B	Red and White
Vineland High School	Vineland	Vineland Public Schools	Fighting Clan	South IV	Red and Gray
Wildwood High School	Wildwood	Wildwood City School District	Warriors	South I	Maroon and White
Wildwood Catholic Academy	North Wildwood	Roman Catholic Diocese of Camden	Crusaders	Non-Public B	Navy and White
