= Woodbine School District =

School district in Cape May County, New Jersey, US

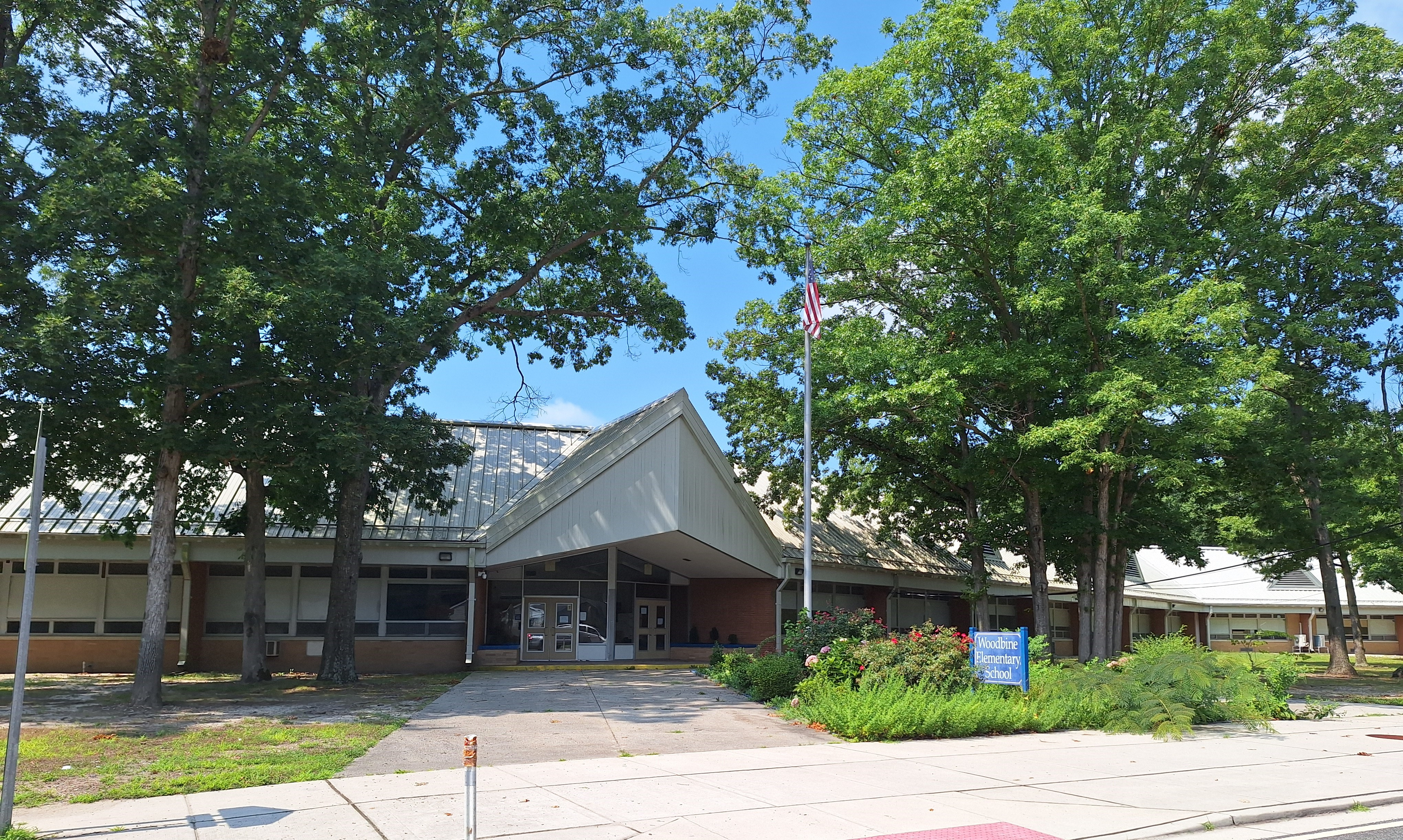

Address
- 801 Webster Avenue Woodbine, Cape May County, New Jersey, 08270; United States
- Coordinates: 39.235053°N 74.816689°W

District information
- Grades: PreK-8
- Superintendent: Carleena Supp
- Business administrator: Ron Latham
- Schools: 1

Students and staff
- Enrollment: 239 (as of 2022–23)
- Faculty: 29.0 FTEs
- Student–teacher ratio: 8.2:1

Other information
- District Factor Group: A
- Website: www.wesnj.org
Ind.	Per pupil	District spending	Rank (*)	K-8 average	%± vs. average
1A	Total Spending	$22,358	54	$18,891	18.4%
1	Budgetary Cost	14,048	22	14,159	−0.8%
2	Classroom Instruction	9,255	36	8,659	6.9%
6	Support Services	2,299	32	2,167	6.1%
8	Administrative Cost	1,527	25	1,547	−1.3%
10	Operations & Maintenance	941	3	1,612	−41.6%
13	Extracurricular Activities	18	8	104	−82.7%
16	Median Teacher Salary	60,209	45	61,136
Data from NJDoE 2014 Taxpayers' Guide to Education Spending. *Of K-8 districts with up to 400 students. Lowest spending=1; Highest=71

The Woodbine School District is a community public school district that serves students in pre-kindergarten through eighth grade from Woodbine, in Cape May County, in the U.S. state of New Jersey.

As of the 2022–23 school year, the district, comprised of one school, had an enrollment of 239 students and 29.0 classroom teachers (on an FTE basis), for a student–teacher ratio of 8.2:1.

The district is classified by the New Jersey Department of Education as being in District Factor Group "A", the lowest of eight groupings. District Factor Groups organize districts statewide to allow comparison by common socioeconomic characteristics of the local districts. From lowest socioeconomic status to highest, the categories are A, B, CD, DE, FG, GH, I and J.

Public school students in ninth through twelfth grades attend Middle Township High School as part of a sending/receiving relationship that began with the 2013-14 school year; students from Avalon, Dennis Township and Stone Harbor also attend the school. As of the 2022–23 school year, the high school had an enrollment of 790 students and 65.0 classroom teachers (on an FTE basis), for a student–teacher ratio of 12.2:1.

== History ==
In 2008, the district had about 215 students in its K-8 school, and it sent 60 students to Millville high schools. It employed 20 teachers for its K-8 students.

Students had previously been sent to attend high school in Millville, as part of a relationship with the Millville Public Schools. Students attended Memorial High School for ninth grade and half of tenth and Millville Senior High School for 10th grade through the 12th grade with those in attendance as of the 2013-14 school year completing until their education in Millville until graduation; the Woodbine district estimated savings of $4,000 per student by the switch from Millville to Middle Township, with total savings of $200,000 annually after all of Woodbine's high school students are attending Middle Township.

In 2008 the Woodbine District was considering switching its receiving high school from Millville to Middle Township. In 2013 the Woodbine chose to change its receiving high school district to Middle Township. Lynda Anderson-Towns, superintendent of the Woodbine district, cited the closer proximity and smaller size of Middle Township High. Millville is 20 miles (32 km) away from Woodbine while Middle Township High is 12 miles (19 km) from Woodbine. The first group of Woodbine 9th graders to Middle Township High began attending in fall 2013. The Woodbine students already attending Millville high schools remained there.

== School ==
Woodbine Elementary School serves students in grades PreK-8. The school had an enrollment of 232 students in the 2022–23 school year.

- Anthony DeVico, principal

== Administration ==
Core members of the district's administration are:

- Carleena Supp, superintendent
- Ron Latham, business administrator and board secretary

== Board of education ==
The district's board of education, composed of nine members, sets policy and oversees the fiscal and educational operation of the district through its administration. As a Type II school district, the board's trustees are elected directly by voters to serve three-year terms of office on a staggered basis, with three seats up for election each year held (since 2012) as part of the November general election. The board appoints a superintendent to oversee the district's day-to-day operations and a business administrator to supervise the business functions of the district.
