= Middle Township Public Schools =

School district in Cape May County, New Jersey, US

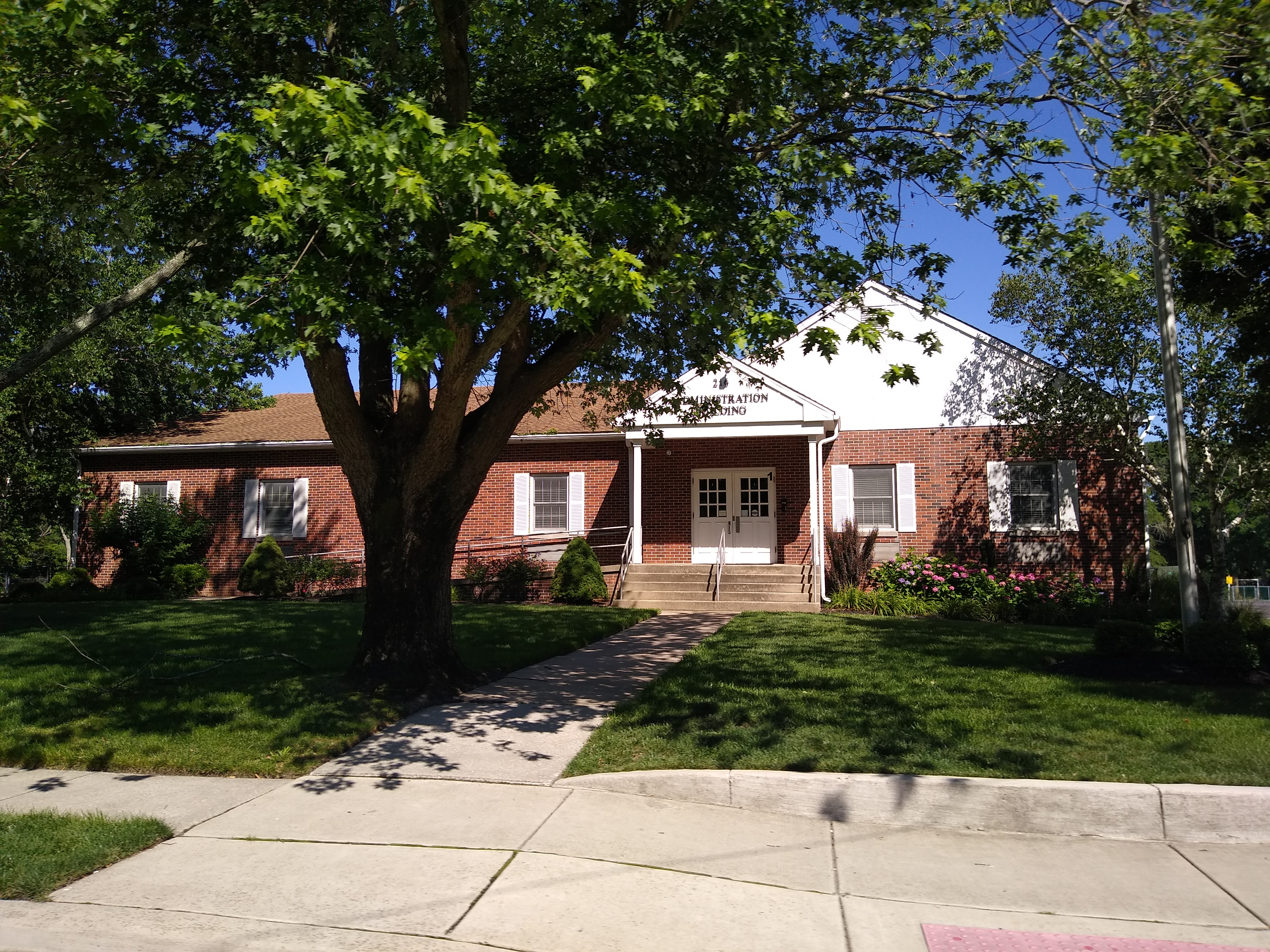
- District headquarters

Address
- 216 South Main Street Cape May Court House, Cape May County, New Jersey, 08210; United States
- Coordinates: 39.078733°N 74.825483°W

District information
- Grades: PreK-12
- Superintendent: Stephanie DeRose
- Business administrator: Diane S. Fox
- Schools: 4

Students and staff
- Enrollment: 2,672 (as of 2023–24)
- Faculty: 222.2 FTEs
- Student–teacher ratio: 12.0:1

Other information
- District Factor Group: B
- Website: middletownshippublicschools.org
Ind.	Per pupil	District spending	Rank (*)	K-12 average	%± vs. average
1A	Total Spending	$18,001	34	$18,891	−4.7%
1	Budgetary Cost	12,211	10	14,783	−17.4%
2	Classroom Instruction	7,071	9	8,763	−19.3%
6	Support Services	1,866	18	2,392	−22.0%
8	Administrative Cost	1,312	13	1,485	−11.6%
10	Operations & Maintenance	1,438	23	1,783	−19.3%
13	Extracurricular Activities	356	24	268	32.8%
16	Median Teacher Salary	61,238	25	64,043
Data from NJDoE 2014 Taxpayers' Guide to Education Spending. *Of K-12 districts with 1,800-3,500 students. Lowest spending=1; Highest=68

The Middle Township Public Schools are a comprehensive community public school district that serves students in pre-kindergarten through twelfth grade from Middle Township, in Cape May County, in the U.S. state of New Jersey.

As of the 2023–24 school year, the district, comprised of four schools, had an enrollment of 2,672 students and 222.2 classroom teachers (on an FTE basis), for a student–teacher ratio of 12.0:1.

Students from Avalon, Dennis Township, Stone Harbor and Woodbine attend the district's high school as part of sending/receiving relationships.

== History ==
In the era of de jure educational segregation in the United States, a school for white children in grades 1-6 was maintained in Rio Grande and a school for black children was maintained in Whitesboro in grades 1–8. White children in Rio Grande were sent to the West Cape May School District for grades 7–12.

In 2013, Woodbine School District changed its receiving high school district from Millville School District to Middle Township district. The first group of Woodbine 9th graders to Middle Township High began attending in fall 2013. Lynda Anderson-Towns, superintendent of the Woodbine district, cited the closer proximity and smaller size of Middle Township High. Millville is 20 miles (32 km) away from Woodbine while Middle Township High is 12 miles (19 km) from Woodbine.

The district was one of 25 statewide that was categorized in 2005 as being "In Need of Improvement" under the terms of the No Child Left Behind Act.

The district had been classified by the New Jersey Department of Education as being in District Factor Group "B", the second-lowest of eight groupings. District Factor Groups organize districts statewide to allow comparison by common socioeconomic characteristics of the local districts. From lowest socioeconomic status to highest, the categories are A, B, CD, DE, FG, GH, I and J.

== Schools ==
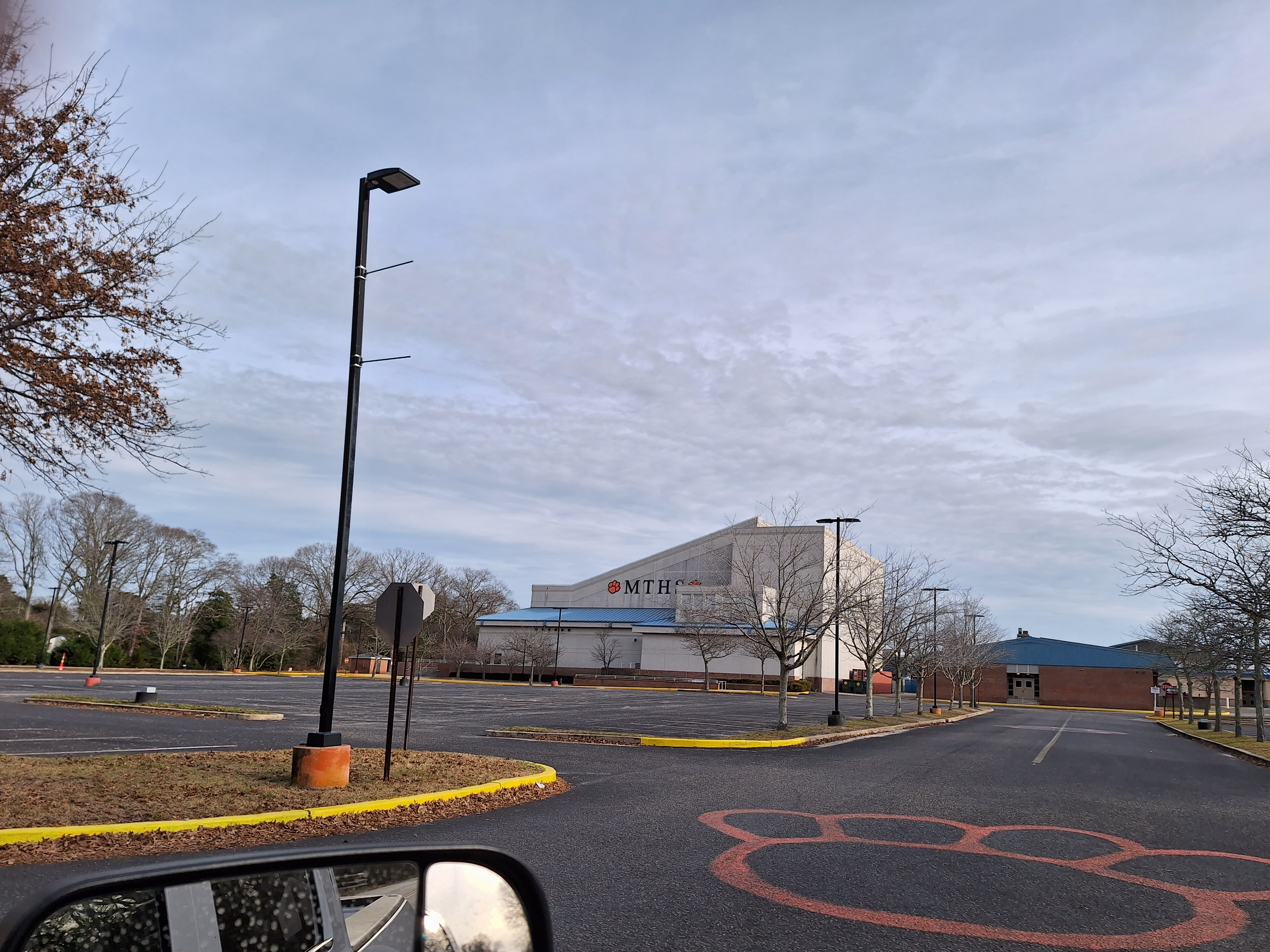
Middle Township High School

Schools in the district (with 2023–24 enrollment data from the National Center for Education Statistics) are:

Elementary schools

- Middle Township Elementary School #1 with 660 students in grades PreK–2
  - Carolyn Sinone, principal
- Middle Township Elementary School #2 with 532 students in grades 3–5
  - Nancy Loteck, principal

Middle school

- Middle Township Middle School with 547 students in grades 6–8
  - Jeffrey Ortman, principal

High school

- Middle Township High School with 825 students in grades 9–12
  - Sharon Rementer, principal

All four schools and the district headquarters are in the Cape May Court House CDP.

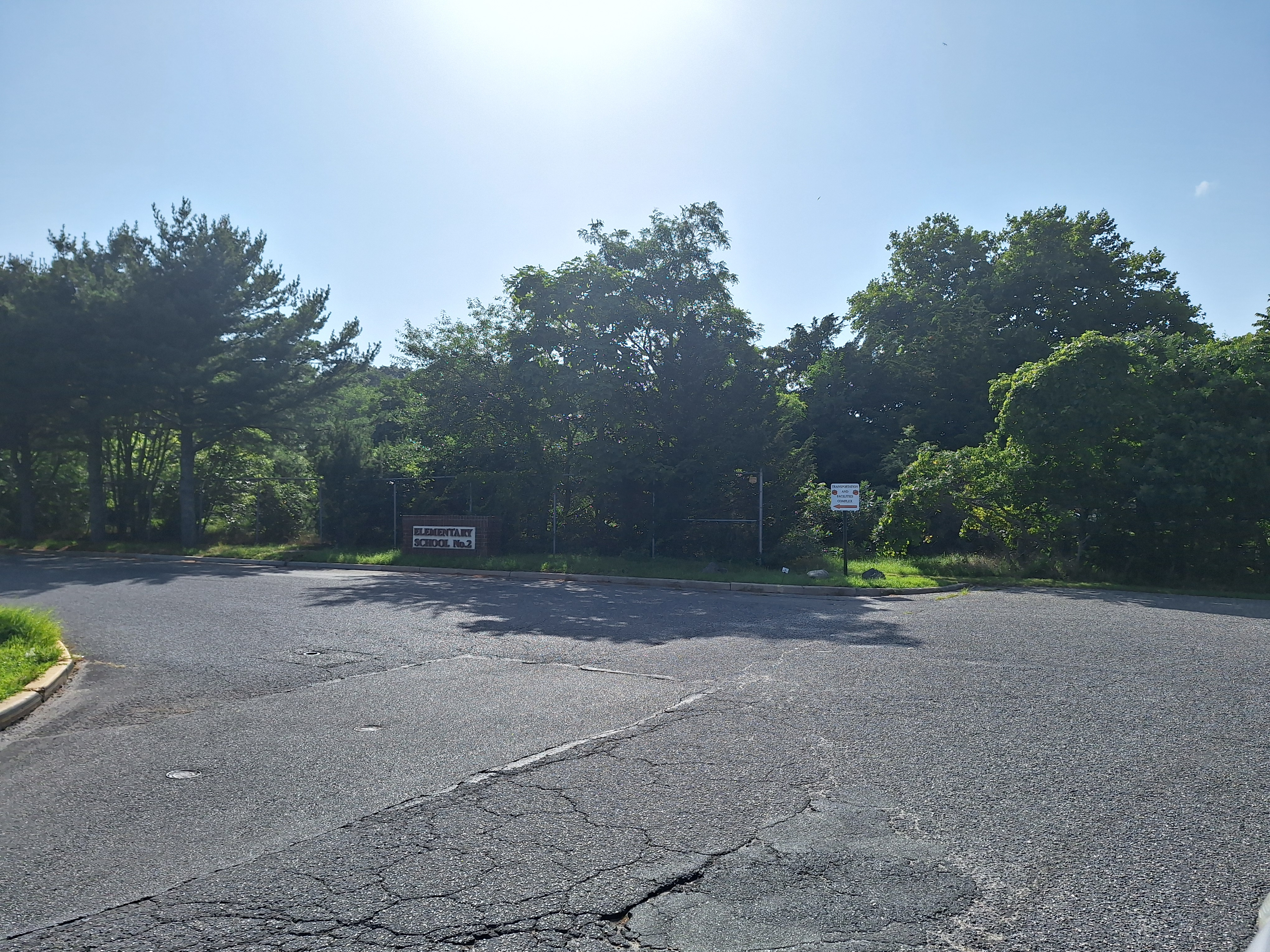
Elementary School #2 Entrance

== Administration ==
Core members of the district's administration are:

- Stephanie DeRose, superintendent
- Diane S. Fox, business administrator and board secretary

== Board of education ==
The district's board of education, comprised of nine members, sets policy and oversees the fiscal and educational operation of the district through its administration. As a Type II school district, the board's trustees are elected directly by voters to serve three-year terms of office on a staggered basis, with three seats up for election each year held (since 2012) as part of the November general election. The board appoints a superintendent to oversee the district's day-to-day operations and a business administrator to supervise the business functions of the district. A tenth board member is appointed to represent Dennis Township.

== Student body ==
In 2008 the district had about 2,879 students.
