= Maurice River Township School District =

School district in Cumberland County, New Jersey, US

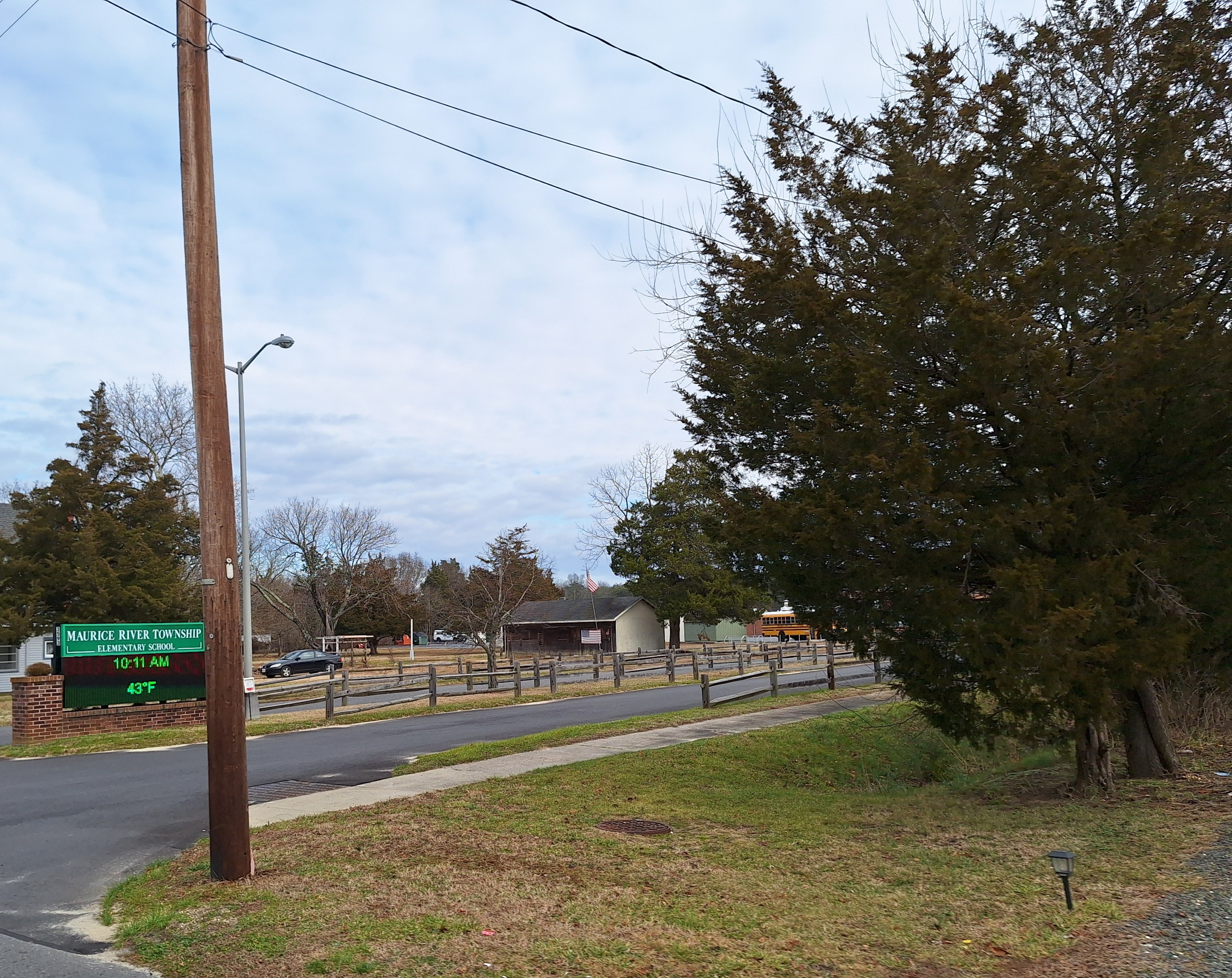
- Maurice River Township Elementary School

Address
- 3593 Route 47 Port Elizabeth, Cumberland County, New Jersey, 08348; United States
- Coordinates: 39.312596°N 74.98046°W

District information
- Grades: PreK to 8
- Superintendent: Jeremy Cohen
- Business administrator: Patricia Powell
- Schools: 1

Students and staff
- Enrollment: 402 (as of 2022–23)
- Faculty: 38.0 FTEs
- Student–teacher ratio: 10.6:1

Other information
- District Factor Group: B
- Website: www.mrtes.com
Ind.	Per pupil	District spending	Rank (*)	K-8 average	%± vs. average
1A	Total Spending	$15,016	3	$18,891	−20.5%
1	Budgetary Cost	10,579	3	14,159	−25.3%
2	Classroom Instruction	6,585	4	8,659	−24.0%
6	Support Services	1,515	9	2,167	−30.1%
8	Administrative Cost	1,576	22	1,547	1.9%
10	Operations & Maintenance	626	1	1,612	−61.2%
13	Extracurricular Activities	27	3	104	−74.0%
16	Median Teacher Salary	57,477	22	61,136
Data from NJDoE 2014 Taxpayers' Guide to Education Spending. *Of K-8 districts with 401-750 students. Lowest spending=1; Highest=64

The Maurice River Township School District is a community public school district that serves students in pre-kindergarten through eighth grade, from Maurice River Township, in Cumberland County, in the U.S. state of New Jersey.

As of the 2022–23 school year, the district, comprised of one school, had an enrollment of 402 students and 38.0 classroom teachers (on an FTE basis), for a student–teacher ratio of 10.6:1.

The district participates in the Interdistrict Public School Choice Program, which allows non-resident students to attend school in the district at no cost to their parents, with tuition covered by the resident district. Available slots are announced annually by grade.

The district had been classified by the New Jersey Department of Education as being in District Factor Group "B", the second-lowest of eight groupings. District Factor Groups organize districts statewide to allow comparison by common socioeconomic characteristics of the local districts. From lowest socioeconomic status to highest, the categories are A, B, CD, DE, FG, GH, I and J.

The district sends 180 students in ninth through twelfth grades for public school to attend high school in Millville, as part of a sending/receiving relationship with the Millville Public Schools, together with students from Commercial Township and Lawrence Township. Starting in the 2022-23 school year, students who had previously been split between Memorial High School for grades 9-10 and Millville Senior High School for grades 10-12 were consolidated into a newly expanded and renovated $145 million Millville High School building. As of the 2022–23 school year, the high school had an enrollment of 1,640 students and 70.0 classroom teachers (on an FTE basis), for a student–teacher ratio of 23.4:1.

== Awards and recognition ==
Maurice River Township School was recognized by Governor Jim McGreevey in 2003 as one of 25 schools selected statewide for the First Annual Governor's School of Excellence award.

== School ==
Maurice River Township School had an enrollment of 393 students in grades PreK-8 in the 2022–23 school year.

== Administration ==
Core members of the district's administration are:

- Jeremy Cohen, superintendent
- Patricia Powell, business administrator and board secretary

== Board of education ==
The district's board of education, comprised of seven members, sets policy and oversees the fiscal and educational operation of the district through its administration. As a Type II school district, the board's trustees are elected directly by voters to serve three-year terms of office on a staggered basis, with either two or three seats up for election each year held (since 2012) as part of the November general election. The board appoints a superintendent to oversee the district's day-to-day operations and a business administrator to supervise the business functions of the district.
