= Woodbine Municipal Airport (New Jersey) =

- IATA: none; ICAO: KOBI; FAA LID: OBI

Summary
- Airport type: Public
- Owner: Woodbine Port Authority
- Serves: Woodbine, New Jersey
- Location: Cape May County
- Elevation AMSL: 42 ft / 13 m
- Coordinates: 39°13′09″N 074°47′41″W
- Website: www.woodbineairport.com

Map
- Interactive map of Woodbine Municipal Airport

Runways
Direction	Length		Surface
Direction	ft	m	Surface
1/19	3,304	1,007	Asphalt
13/31	3,073	937	Asphalt

Statistics (2011)
- Aircraft operations: 12,375
- Based aircraft: 68
- Source: Federal Aviation Administration

Woodbine Municipal Airport (ICAO: KOBI, FAA LID: OBI, formerly 1N4) is a public use airport located two nautical miles (4 km) southeast of the central business district of Woodbine, in Cape May County, New Jersey, United States. The airport is owned by the Borough of Woodbine. It is included in the National Plan of Integrated Airport Systems for 2011–2015, which categorized it as a general aviation facility.

Although many U.S. airports use the same three-letter location identifier for the FAA and IATA, this airport is assigned OBI by the FAA, but has no designation from the IATA (which assigned OBI to an airport in Óbidos, Pará, Brazil).

== Facilities and aircraft ==
Woodbine Municipal Airport covers an area of 700 acres (283 ha) at an elevation of 42 feet (13 m) above mean sea level. It has two runways with asphalt surfaces: 1/19 is 3,304 by 75 feet (1,007 x 23 m) and 13/31 is 3,073 by 75 feet (937 x 23 m).

For the 12-month period ending January 1, 2011, the airport had 12,375 general aviation aircraft operations, an average of 33 per day. At that time there were 68 aircraft based at this airport: 95.6% single-engine, 2.9% ultralight, and 1.5% helicopter.

Med-Trans Corp has a Medevac helicopter based at the airport.

== Incidents ==
On Tuesday October 23, 2018, a Mooney M20C aircraft crashed on the airport field. The pilot, Wayne Rumble of Marmora, was fatally injured. Rumble was an experienced pilot and a certificated flight instructor. He was also the Woodbine airport manager for many years. The FAA and NTSB are conducting an investigation to determine the cause of the accident.

On November 14, 2009, a Piper PA-28R-200, N4499T, was substantially damaged when it impacted terrain about 10 minutes after takeoff from Woodbine Airport. The certificated, private pilot Thaddeus Lasowski, 53, and the passenger Thaddeus Lasowski, 12, both of Dennis Township, were fatally injured.

On June 20, 2008, an amateur-built F1 Rocket, N623BL, which took off from the Woodbine Airport was substantially damaged when it impacted terrain while maneuvering near Belleplain, NJ. The certificated private pilot Dennis McGurk Jr., 37 and passenger Oksana McGurk, 34, both of Mays Landing, NJ, were fatally injured.

On February 7, 2005, an unregistered, amateur built Air Creation Clipper 912 which took off from the Woodbine Airport was destroyed when it impacted terrain near the airfield. The pilot, Gerard Workman, 49, of Tuckahoe, NJ, and Harry Boulden, 52, of Brooklawn, were fatally injured.

== See also ==
- List of airports in New Jersey
