= Virginia Davis Floyd =

African-American physician

Virginia Davis Floyd (born 1951) is an American physician known for her work in public health, foreign policy, and the nonprofit sector.

== Early life and education ==
Born Virginia Davis in Sea Isle City, New Jersey, she graduated from Middle Township High School. She completed her undergraduate education at Spelman College and Sophia University. She then attended Howard University College of Medicine, graduating in 1976, and was a resident at Emory University Hospital until 1979. She returned later to Emory to earn her Master's in Public Health, graduating in 1987.

== Career and research ==
Floyd has spent her career working with indigenous people worldwide to integrate traditional medicine with allopathic medicine. She has worked with indigenous people in the United States, Egypt, Mali, Senegal, Nigeria, Guatemala, Costa Rica, and Jamaica. While a resident at Emory, Floyd researched the impact of American foreign policy on African people as part of the National Association for the Advancement of Colored People (NAACP) Task Force on Africa. After completing residency in 1979, Floyd joined the Centers for Disease Control and Prevention (CDC) as a medical officer and researched poliomyelitis epidemiology for a year in Cameroon.

Upon her return to the United States, Floyd joined the National Health Services Corps to serve in rural Palmetto, Georgia for a three-year term. She then accepted a position to develop a family medicine residency program at Morehouse College in Atlanta, Georgia. As a public health director at the Georgia Department of Health and Human Resources from 1984 to 1997, she increased immunization rates, reduced infant mortality, improved prenatal care, and improved childhood nutrition. She also worked with the World Health OrganizationoCollaborating Centern perinatal care and maternal/child health research. She worked for the Ford Foundation as the director of Human Development and Reproductive Health from 1997 to 2002.

In 2003, she returned to her undergraduate alma mater as a visiting scholar. At the time, she led PROMETRA (Association for the Promotion of Traditional Medicine), a US nonprofit focusing on traditional medicine. As of 2006, she was on the faculty of Morehouse College.

== Honors and awards ==
- W. K. Kellogg Foundation National Leadership Fellowship (1991)
- Phillips Medal of Public Service, Ohio University College of Osteopathic Medicine (1998)
- National Community Service Award, Spelman College Board of Trustees (2005)
- National Board of Trustees, March of Dimes (2006)
- Friend of Georgia's Children Award, American Academy of Pediatrics
