= Hirsch Loeb Sabsovich =

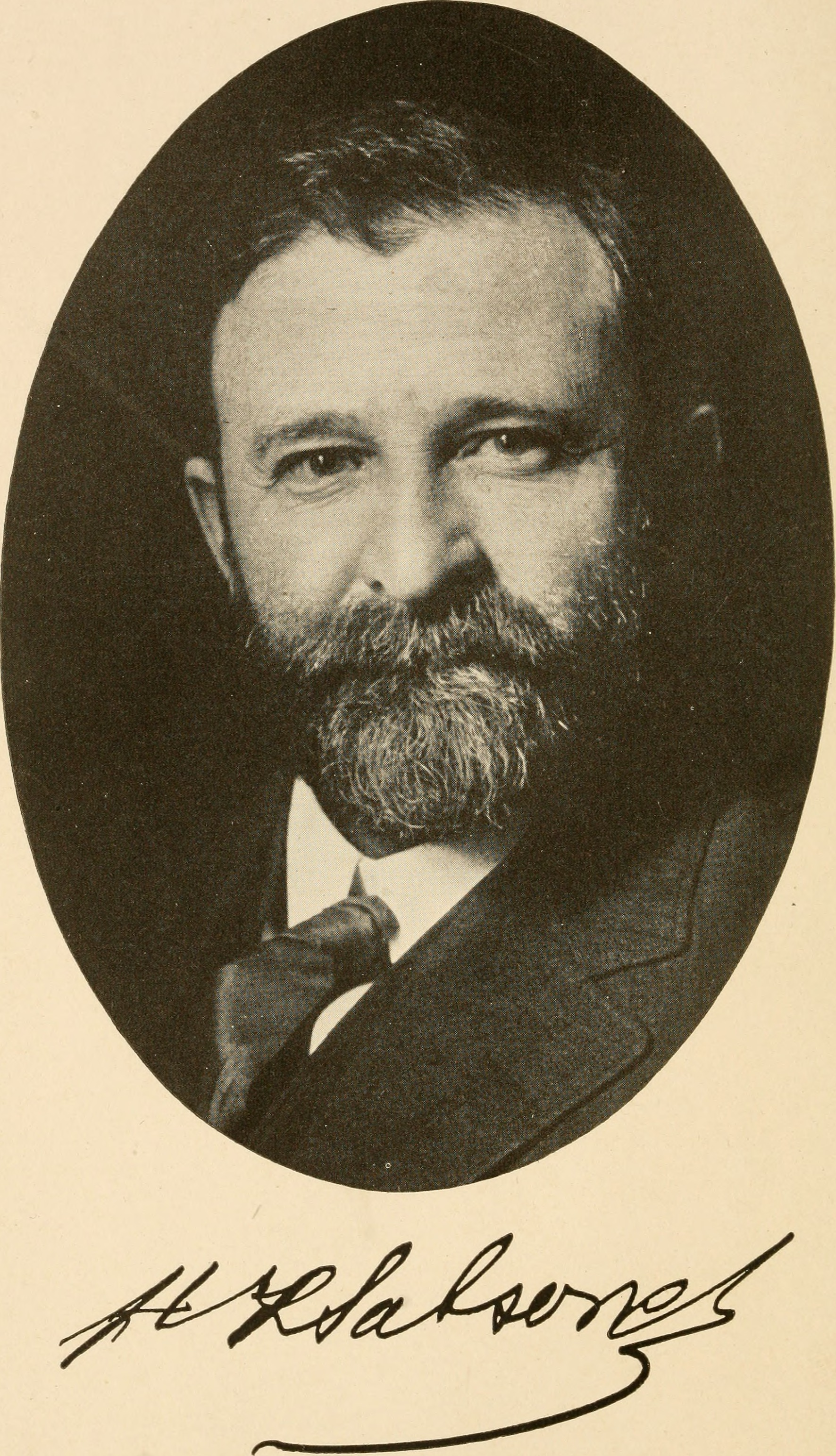

Hirsch Loeb Sabsovich (1860 – 1915) was a Russian-born Jewish American agronomist, chemist, agricultural educator, Mayor of Woodbine, New Jersey, General Agent of the Baron de Hirsch Fund, and a leader of the Am Olam movement.

He was born in Berdiansk, and his father died when he was four years old. During his youth he was known as Grisha or Gregory, rather than by his given names. He studied law at Odesa University, but did not complete the course, choosing instead to study agriculture in Zurich.

He married Katharine on 25 April 1882. They emigrated to the United States, with their two daughters, arriving in New York in July 1887 on the steamer Fulda. Sabsovich learned English after his arrival. They subsequently moved to Fort Collins, Colorado, where he worked in an agricultural laboratory and lectured in chemistry at Wyoming College, and a third daughter was born.

Sabsovich was chosen to lead the Woodbine Jewish agricultural community when it was established in the 1890s. When the community was incorporated as a borough in 1903, around which time about 80% of its residents were Jewish, Sabsovich was elected as Woodbine's first mayor.

He was survived by his wife. In 1922, she published privately a biography of him.
