= Woodbine Brotherhood Synagogue =

- U.S. National Register of Historic Places
- New Jersey Register of Historic Places
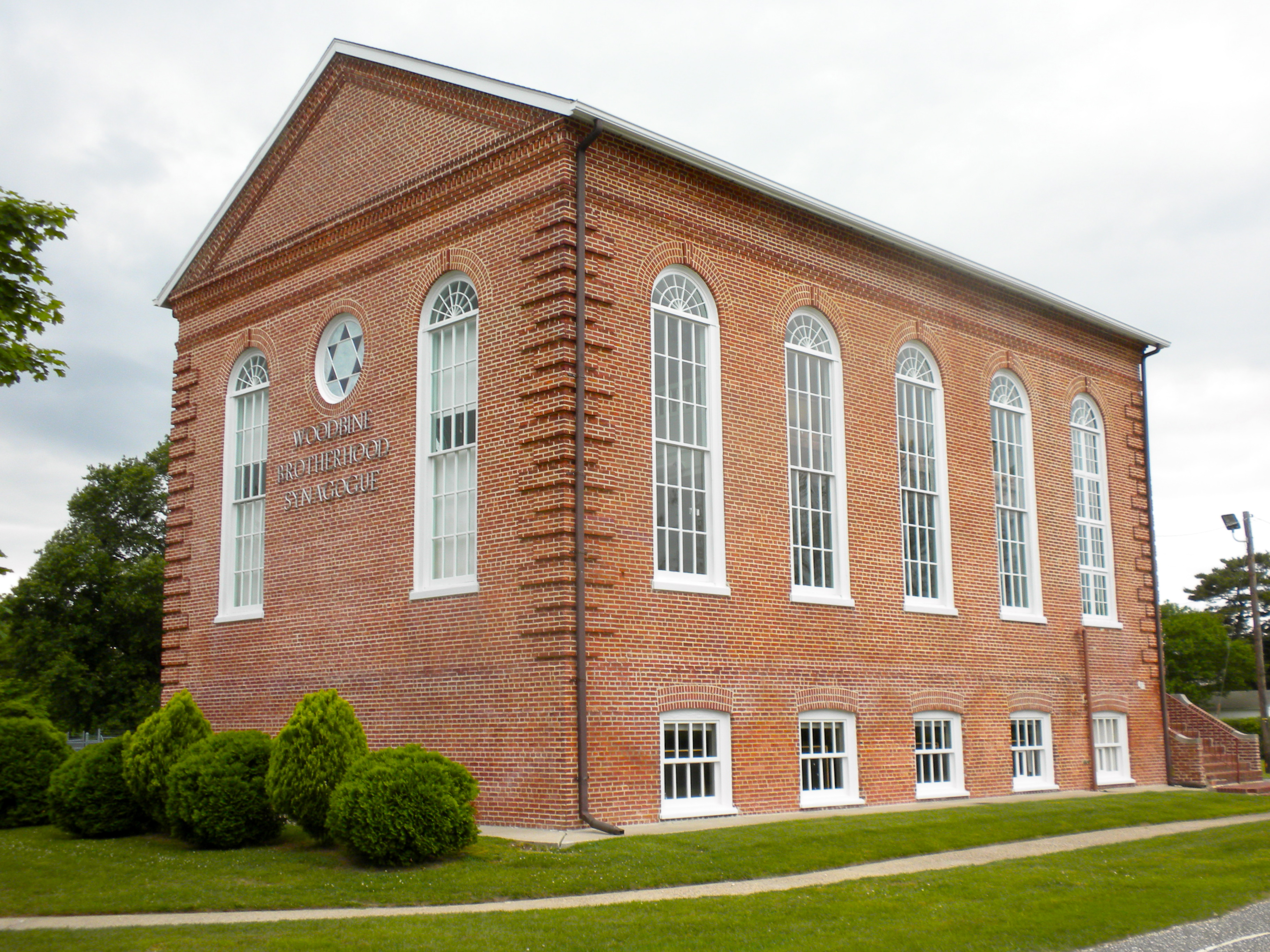

- Location within Cape May County, New Jersey Location within New Jersey Location within the United States
- Location: 612 Washington Avenue, Woodbine, New Jersey
- Coordinates: 39°14′21″N 74°49′8″W
- Built: 1896
- Architectural style: Neoclassical architecture
- NRHP reference No.: 80002479
- NJRHP No.: 1018

Significant dates
- Added to NRHP: September 17, 1980
- Designated NJRHP: June 25, 1980

The Woodbine Brotherhood Synagogue is a historic Jewish synagogue at 612 Washington Avenue in the borough of Woodbine in Cape May County, New Jersey, United States. According to a historical marker on the property, it was founded by Russian Jews fleeing pogroms in the 1890s. It was built in 1896 and was documented by the Historic American Buildings Survey (HABS) in 1979. It was added to the National Register of Historic Places on September 17, 1980, for its significance in architecture, religion, and social history.

== Sam Azeez Museum of Woodbine History ==
The building now houses the Sam Azeez Museum of Woodbine History. Exhibits include the community's Russian Jewish immigrant heritage, local history and culture.

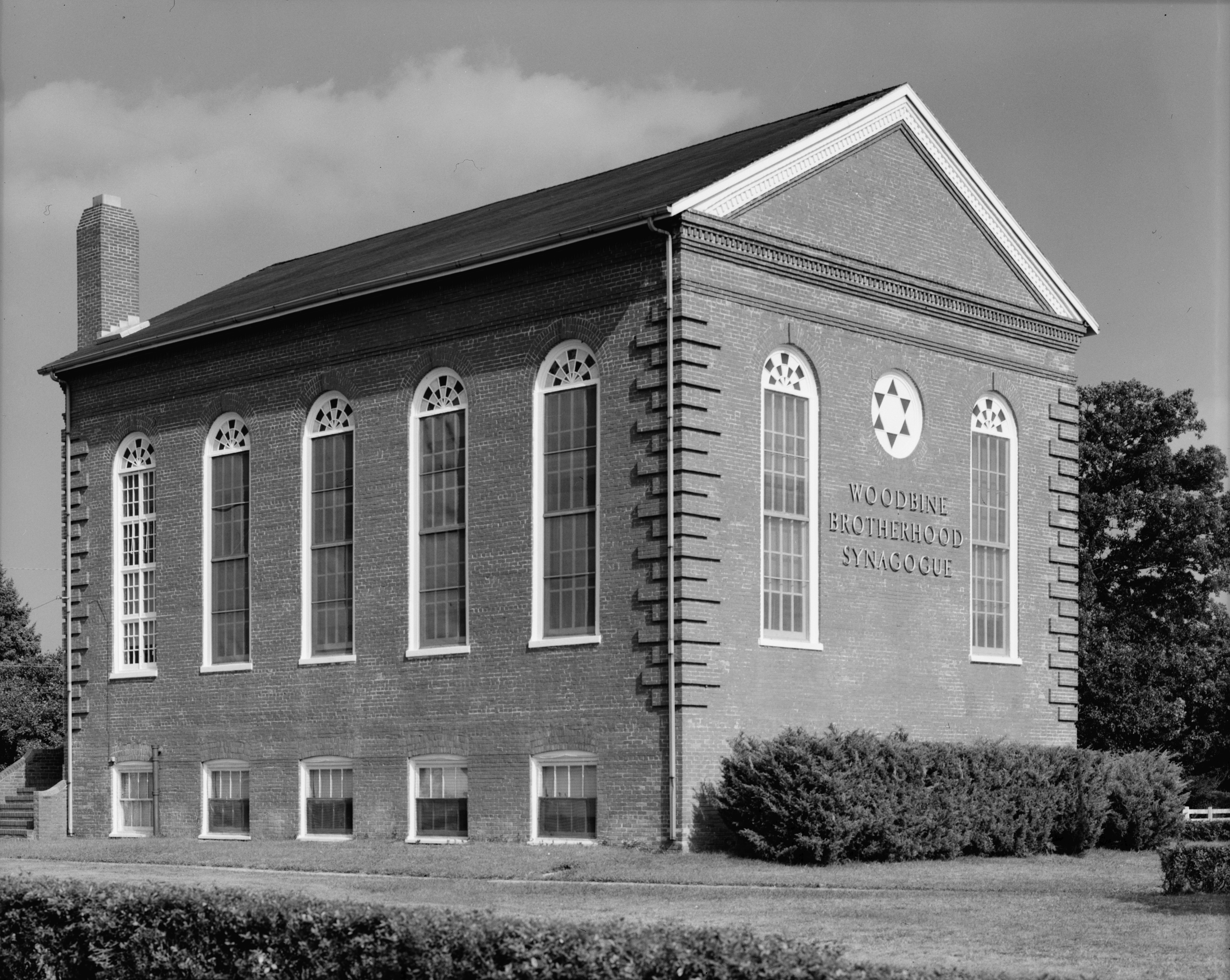
HABS photo from 1979

== See also ==
- National Register of Historic Places listings in Cape May County, New Jersey
