= Steve Romanik =

American football player (1924–2009)

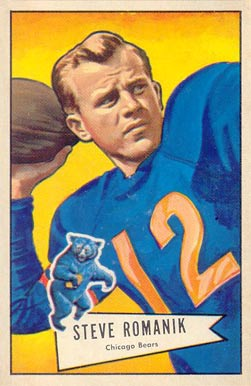
- Romanik on a 1952 Bowman football card

No. 12
- Position: Quarterback

Personal information
- Born: May 27, 1924; Millville, New Jersey, U.S.
- Died: September 16, 2009 (aged 85); Millville, New Jersey, U.S.
- Listed height: 6 ft 1 in (1.85 m)
- Listed weight: 190 lb (86 kg)

Career information
- High school: Millville
- College: Villanova
- NFL draft: 1950: 3rd round, 36th overall pick

Career history
- Chicago Bears (1950–1953); Chicago Cardinals (1953-1954)

Career NFL statistics
- Passing attempts: 433
- Passing completions: 179
- Completion percentage: 41.3%
- TD–INT: 13–36
- Passing yards: 2,556
- Passer rating: 36.5
- Stats at Pro Football Reference

Steve Romanik (May 27, 1924 – September 16, 2009) was an American professional football player. Romanik grew up in Millville, New Jersey of a Ukrainian-American family, and played high school football at Millville Senior High School, later serving on the Millville City Commission. He played collegiate football for the Villanova Wildcats, and played quarterback in the NFL from 1950 to 1954 for the Chicago Bears and Chicago Cardinals.
