= Millville High School (New Jersey) =

High school in Cumberland County, New Jersey, US

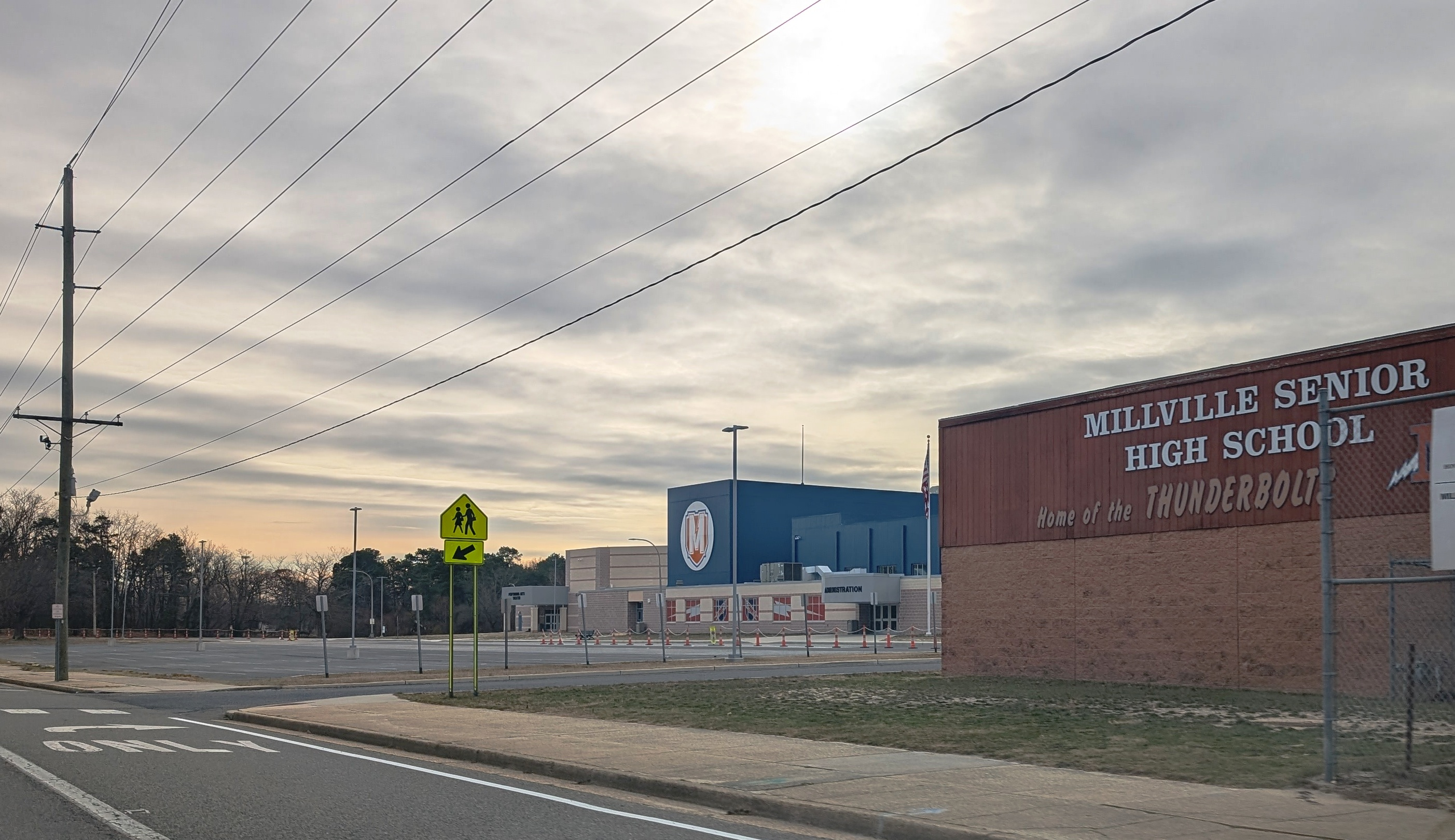
- Front of school

Location
- 200 Wade Boulevard; Millville, Cumberland County, New Jersey 08332; United States; 39.397965°N 75.018389°W

Information
- Type: Public high school
- School district: Millville Public Schools
- NCES School ID: 341032001868
- Principal: Jaime Sutton
- Faculty: 119.0 FTEs
- Grades: 9-12
- Enrollment: 1,687 (as of 2024–25)
- Student to teacher ratio: 14.2:1
- Colors: Orange and Blue
- Athletics conference: Cape-Atlantic League (general); West Jersey Football League (football)
- Team name: Thunderbolts
- Rival: Vineland High School
- Newspaper: Tattler
- Yearbook: Torch
- Website: mhs.millville.org

Millville High School is a comprehensive community public high school located in Millville, in Cumberland County, in the U.S. state of New Jersey, serving students in ninth through twelfth grades as part of Millville Public Schools. The school has been accredited by the Middle States Association of Colleges and Schools Commission on Elementary and Secondary Schools since 1943.

Maurice River Township sends 180 students who attend the district's high schools, as part of a sending/receiving relationship with the Maurice River Township School District. Commercial Township and Lawrence Township also send students to the district's high schools; The sending districts filed suit in 2009, challenging the way in which the Millville district charges for students from outside the district to attend the school. Students from Woodbine had attended the district's high schools as part of a sending/receiving relationship, before the Woodbine district switched to have students attend Middle Township High School starting with freshmen starting school in the 2013–14 school year.

As of the 2024–25 school year, the school had an enrollment of 1,687 students and 119.0 classroom teachers (on an FTE basis), for a student–teacher ratio of 14.2:1. There were 1,077 students (63.8% of enrollment) eligible for free lunch and 138 (8.2% of students) eligible for reduced-cost lunch.

== History ==
In 2016, the school board decided to create a single principal position for all high school students as it had plans to consolidate the two high schools. That year Kathy Procopio, the principal, chose to retire. David Gentile, the superintendent, stated that the retirement made the district's principal consolidation plans more complex.

As part of an expansion and renovation project overseen by the New Jersey Schools Development Authority that ultimately cost $145 million and had been scheduled to start in 2017, the school's capacity was to be doubled to accommodate up to 2,300 students, allowing all of the freshmen and sophomore classes that had been at Memorial High School to be consolidated at the Senior High School building; for the 2017–18 school year, all high school students were shifted into Millville High School. The completion of the project was marked in September 2023, which ultimately doubled the size of the building and added 200,000 square feet (19,000 m^{2}) of space to the facility that had opened in 1964 to replace the original high school building that was completed in 1925.

== Awards, recognition and rankings ==
The school was the 291st-ranked public high school in New Jersey out of 339 schools statewide in New Jersey Monthly magazine's September 2014 cover story on the state's "Top Public High Schools", using a new ranking methodology. The school had been ranked 308th in the state of 328 schools in 2012, after being ranked 306th in 2010 out of 322 schools listed. The magazine ranked the school 289th in 2008 out of 316 schools. The school was ranked 295th in the magazine's September 2006 issue, which surveyed 316 schools across the state.

Millville High School is a participant in the NASA Toys in Space program, a joint project of American and Russian students to learn the science behind designing a toy, and about the study of space.

== Athletics ==
The Millville High School Thunderbolts compete in the American Division of the Cape-Atlantic League, an athletic conference comprised of parochial and public high schools located in Atlantic, Cape May, Cumberland and Gloucester counties that operates under the supervision of the New Jersey State Interscholastic Athletic Association (NJSIAA). With 1,260 students in grades 10-12, the school was classified by the NJSIAA for the 2022-23 school year as South, Group 4 for most athletic competition purposes, which included schools with an enrollment of 1,060 to 5,049 students in that grade range. The football team competes in the American Division of the 94-team West Jersey Football League superconference and was classified by the NJSIAA as Group IV South for football for 2024–2026, which included schools with 890 to 1,298 students.

Since 1893, Vineland High School, in Vineland, has participated in an annual Thanksgiving football game with Millville High School. The rivalry is one of the oldest public high school rivalries in the United States and the state's oldest, with Vineland leading the series 64-63-19, heading into the 2017 game. The rivalry with Vineland was listed at 6th on NJ.com's 2017 list "Ranking the 31 fiercest rivalries in N.J. HS football".

The boys' tennis team was the state overall co-champion in 1950 with Asbury Park High School, the first year that the state title was determined by playoffs.

The boys' track team won the Group IV spring / outdoor track state championship in 1970, 1998 (as co-champion), 1999 and 2001.

The football team won the NJSIAA South Jersey Group IV state sectional title in 1975 and the South Jersey Group V title in 2016. The 1975 team finished the season with an 11-0 record after winning the South Jersey Group IV state sectional title by defeating defending champion Brick Township High School 22-12 in the championship game to snap Brick's 20-game winning streak. The team won the South Jersey Group V state sectional championship in 2016, defeating Toms River High School North by a score of 22–16 in the tournament final.

Field hockey coach Claudia E. McCarthy, inducted into the New Jersey Coaches Hall of Fame in 1990, won her 500th game in 2011 in her 41st season as a coach, with a win against Middle Township High School. She became the fifth coach to reach 500 field hockey victories.

The girls' track team won the indoor relay state championship in Group IV in 2019.

The girls' spring track team was the Group IV state champion in 2019.

== Administration ==
The principal is Jaime Sutton. Her administration team includes four vice principals.

== Notable alumni ==
- LeQuint Allen (born 2004, class of 2022), running back for the Syracuse Orange
- Ryquell Armstead (born 1996, class of 2015), running back for the Jacksonville Jaguars.
- Lotzeir Brooks (class of 2025), American football wide receiver for the Alabama Crimson Tide
- Fred Pierce Corson (1896–1985, class of 1913), Bishop of the Methodist Church and United Methodist Church
- Merritt Gant (born 1971, class of 1989), guitarist who had played with the heavy metal band Overkill
- Bubba Green (1957–2019) played defensive tackle for the Baltimore Colts in 1981
- Leon Henderson (1895–1986), administrator of the Office of Price Administration from 1941 to 1942
- Dwayne Hendricks (born 1986), former football defensive tackle
- Buddy Kennedy (born 1998, class of 2017), professional baseball third baseman for the Detroit Tigers of Major League Baseball
- R. Bruce Land (born 1950, class of 1968), politician and former corrections officer who represented the 1st Legislative District in the New Jersey General Assembly from 2016 to 2020
- Andy Lapihuska (1922–1996), professional baseball pitcher who played for the Philadelphia Phillies
- Larry Milbourne (born 1951), former utility infielder who played 11 seasons in Major League Baseball
- Calvin Murray (born 1958), running back who played in the NFL for the Philadelphia Eagles
- Steve Romanik (1924–2009, class of 1942), NFL quarterback from 1950 to 1954 for the Chicago Bears and Chicago Cardinals
- Barry H. Streeter (born c. 1949, class of 1967), former college football coach
- Bob Surace (born 1968), head coach of the Princeton Tigers football team
- Mike Trout (born 1991), MLB center fielder for the Los Angeles Angels
- Steve Yerkes (1888–1971), baseball player
