= Bubba Green =

American football player (1957–2019)

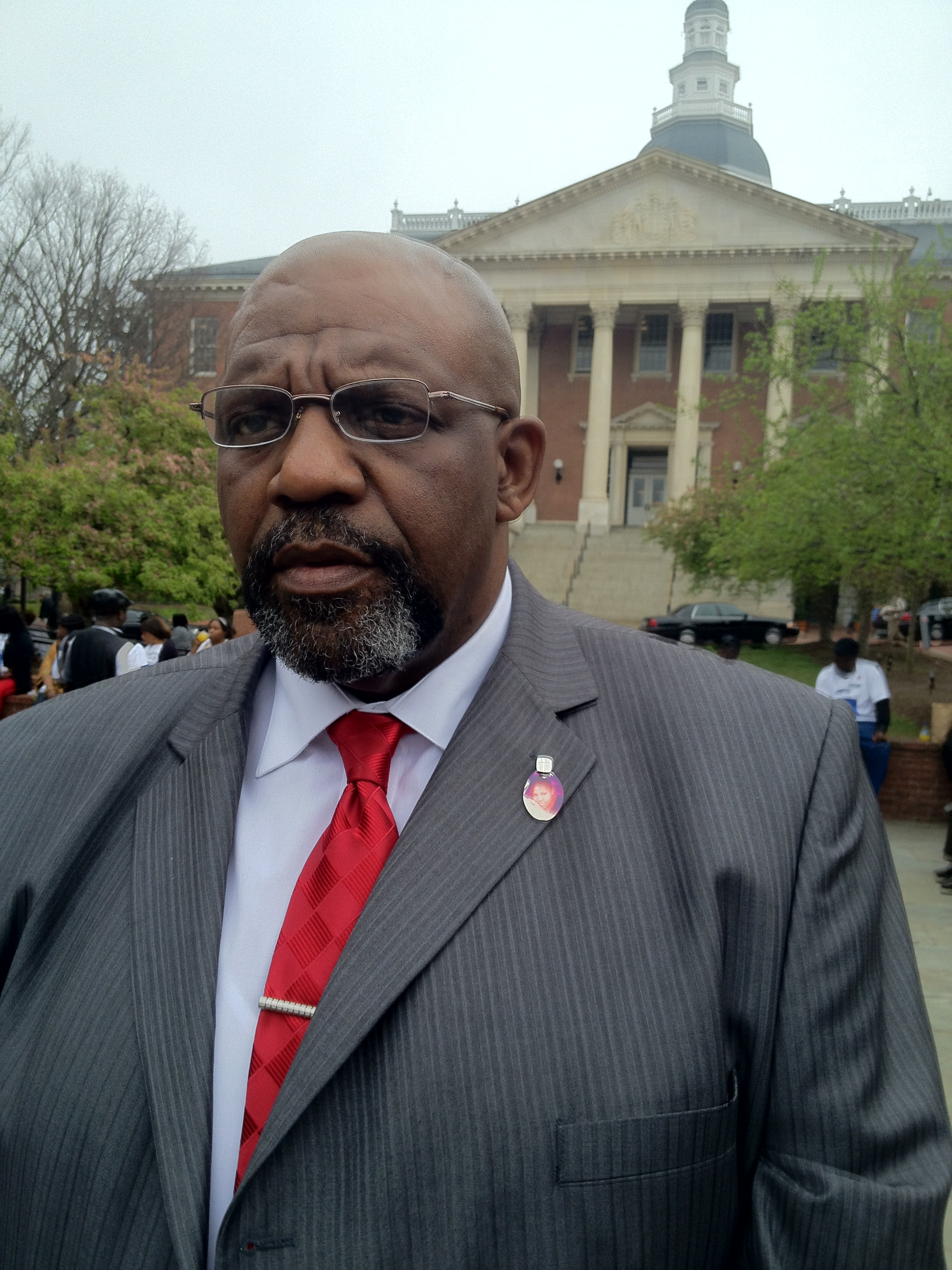
- Green in 2012

No. 91
- Position: Defensive tackle

Personal information
- Born: September 30, 1957; Cape May, New Jersey, U.S.
- Died: June 21, 2019 (aged 61); Randallstown, Maryland, U.S.
- Listed height: 6 ft 4 in (1.93 m)
- Listed weight: 278 lb (126 kg)

Career information
- High school: Millville (Millville, New Jersey)
- College: NC State
- NFL draft: 1981: 6th round, 149th overall pick

Career history
- Baltimore Colts (1981)

Awards and highlights
- First-team All-ACC (1980)

Career NFL statistics
- Sacks: 2
- Fumble recoveries: 1
- Interceptions: 1
- Stats at Pro Football Reference

Anthony Wayne "Bubba" Green (September 30, 1957 – June 21, 2019) was an American professional football player who was a defensive lineman for one season for the Baltimore Colts.

== Background ==
Green was born in Cape May, New Jersey and grew up in Woodbine. He graduated from Millville High School. His father, who was a police officer, left the family when Green was 13 years old. Despite Green's dyslexia, he was accepted at North Carolina State University, where he played football.

=== College career ===
Green entered North Carolina State in 1976 and lettered in football for four years. At 6 feet 4 inches (1.93 m) and 278 pounds (126 kg), Green played defensive tackle and won several individual honors during his college career. He was also a member of the 1977 and 1978 NC State track teams.

=== NFL ===
Green was picked in the 6th round of the NFL draft in 1981 by the Baltimore Colts. Green wore jersey #91 and played right defensive tackle. In his first season, he played in 15 games and started 10 of them with one interception, one fumble recovery and no sacks. Green suffered a knee injury and never played another game in the NFL.

== Personal ==
Green lived with his wife, Nancy (Arrington), in Randallstown, Maryland. Green's daughter, Deanna Camille Green died in an accident on May 5, 2006, when she made contact with a chain-link fence that had become electrified by the city's power grid. The fence was part of a softball field in Baltimore's Druid Hill Park where Deanna was playing. Deanna was stretching before her at-bat when she touched the electrified fence. Her death was instantaneous. The Greens subsequently petitioned the Maryland Public Service Commission and the Maryland State Legislature for stricter safety measures. He died from cancer on June 21, 2019.
