= Millville Public Schools =

School district in Cumberland County, New Jersey, US

- 110 North Third Street Millville, Cumberland County, New Jersey, 08332

District information
- Grades: PreK-12
- Superintendent: Tony Trongone
- Business administrator: Richard Davidson
- Schools: 9
- Affiliation(s): Former Abbott district

Students and staff
- Enrollment: 5,107 (as of 2021–22)
- Faculty: 433.5 FTEs
- Student–teacher ratio: 11.8:1

Other information
- District Factor Group: A
- Website: www.millville.org
Ind.	Per pupil	District spending	Rank (*)	K-12 average	%± vs. average
1A	Total Spending	$18,372	47	$18,891	−2.7%
1	Budgetary Cost	14,598	55	14,783	−1.3%
2	Classroom Instruction	8,197	30	8,763	−6.5%
6	Support Services	2,972	89	2,392	24.2%
8	Administrative Cost	1,535	68	1,485	3.4%
10	Operations & Maintenance	1,683	56	1,783	−5.6%
13	Extracurricular Activities	202	33	268	−24.6%
16	Median Teacher Salary	59,496	26	64,043
Data from NJDoE 2014 Taxpayers' Guide to Education Spending. *Of K-12 districts with more than 3,500 students. Lowest spending=1; Highest=103

Millville Public Schools is a school district that serves students in pre-kindergarten-twelfth grade from the city of Millville, in Cumberland County, in the U.S. state of New Jersey. The district is one of 31 former Abbott districts statewide that were established pursuant to the decision by the New Jersey Supreme Court in Abbott v. Burke which are now referred to as "SDA Districts" based on the requirement for the state to cover all costs for school building and renovation projects in these districts under the supervision of the New Jersey Schools Development Authority.

As of the 2021–22 school year, the district, comprised of nine schools, had an enrollment of 5,107 students and 433.5 classroom teachers (on an FTE basis), for a student–teacher ratio of 11.8:1.

The district is classified by the New Jersey Department of Education as being in District Factor Group "A", the lowest of eight groupings. District Factor Groups organize districts statewide to allow comparison by common socioeconomic characteristics of the local districts. From the lowest socioeconomic status to highest, the categories are A, B, CD, DE, FG, GH, I and J.

The district has high school sending/receiving relationships with Commercial Township, Lawrence Township and Maurice River Township. Students from Woodbine had attended the district's high school programs until a July 2013 ruling by the New Jersey Department of Transportation under which Woodbine students would start attending Middle Township High School as of September 2014, while Woodbine students who had already started attendance in Millville would be allowed to graduate.

== History ==
In 2013 Woodbine School District chose to change its receiving high school district from Millville district to Middle Township School District, which meant it would begin sending high school students to Middle Township High School instead of the Millville high schools. Lynda Anderson-Towns, superintendent of the Woodbine district, cited the closer proximity and smaller size of Middle Township High. Millville is 20 miles (32 km) away from Woodbine while Middle Township High is 12 miles (19 km) from Woodbine.

Starting in the 1960s, grades 9-10 had been served in Memorial High School and grades 9-12 at Millville Senior High School.

R. D. Wood Elementary School, which opened in 1915 and therefore at the time was the oldest school in the district, was closed at the end of the 2017-18 school year. The closure was estimated to result in savings of $1.8 million annually. At one time, Thunderbolt Academy leased space at the ex-St. Mary Magdalen Regional School building, but in 2017 the district announced it would move it into the former Wood elementary building, which meant the district would save $50,000 each year.

As part of an expansion and renovation project overseen by the New Jersey Schools Development Authority that ultimately cost $145 million and had been scheduled to start in 2017, the school's size and capacity was doubled to accommodate up to 2,300 students, allowing all of the freshmen and sophomore classes that had been at Memorial High School to be consolidated at the Senior High School building; for the 2017–18 school year, all high school students were shifted temporarily into Millville High School. The completion of the project was marked in September 2023, which ultimately doubled the size of the building and added 200,000 square feet (19,000 m^{2}) of space to the facility that had opened in 1964 to replace the original high school building that was completed in 1925.

== Schools ==
Schools in the district (with 2021–22 enrollment data from the National Center for Education Statistics) are:

Preschool

- Child Family Center with 520 students in PreK
  - JoAnn Deckert Burns, principal

Primary schools

- R. M. Bacon Elementary School with 262 students in grades K-5
  - Spike Cook, principal
- Holly Heights Elementary School with 487 students in grades K-5
  - Stephen Saul, principal
- Mount Pleasant Elementary School with 173 students in grades K-5
  - Harry Drew, principal
- Rieck Avenue Elementary School with 415 students in grades K-5
  - Michael Coyle, principal
- Silver Run Elementary School with 423 students in grades K-5
  - Eric Reissek, principal

Middle schools

- Lakeside Middle School with 999 students in grades 6-8
  - Amanda Gauntt, principal

High schools

- Millville High School with a total 1,638 students in grades 9-12
  - Jaime Sutton, principal

Alternative school

- Thunderbolt Academy is a partnership between Millville Public Schools and Camelot Education. Camelot offers an alternative setting for students facing behavioral, emotional or academic challenges.
  - Abdul Payne, executive director

== Administration ==
Core members of the district's administration are:

- Tony Trongone, superintendent
- Richard Davidson, business administrator and board secretary

== Board of education ==
The district's board of education, comprised of nine members, sets policy and oversees the fiscal and educational operation of the district through its administration. As a Type II school district, the board's trustees are elected directly by voters to serve three-year terms of office on a staggered basis, with three seats up for election each year held (since 2012) as part of the November general election; there is one representative from Commercial Township and one from Lawrence Township, who represent those communities about issues related to their sending relationship at the high school. The board appoints a superintendent to oversee the district's day-to-day operations and a business administrator to supervise the business functions of the district.
