= Cape May County Technical High School =

Vocational high school in New Jersey, United States

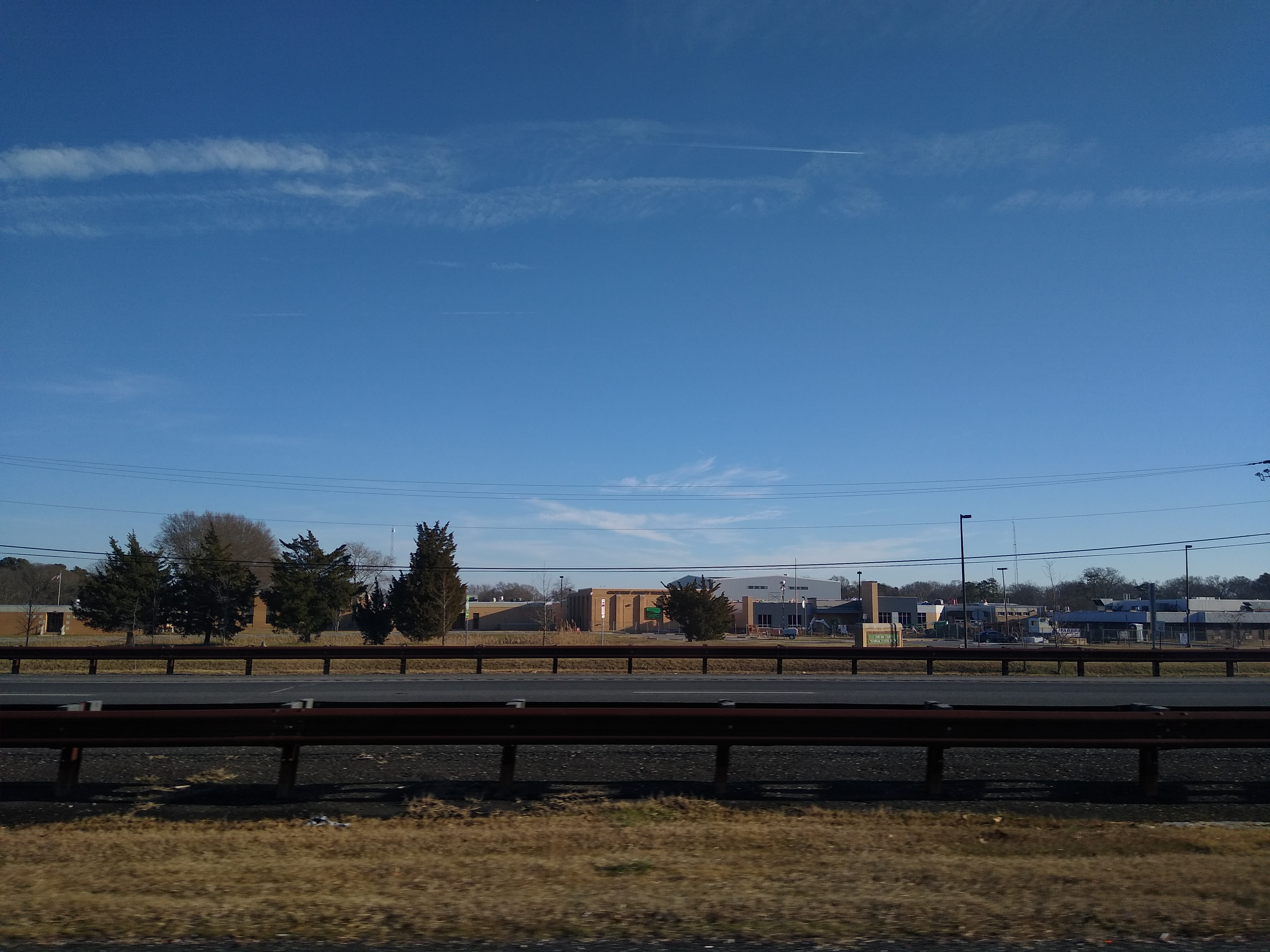

Location
- 188 Crest Haven Road; Cape May Court House, Cape May County, New Jersey 08210; United States
- 39.1043°N 74.7977°W

Information
- Type: Public high school
- Established: 1991
- School district: Cape May County Technical School District
- NCES School ID: 340273001712
- Principal: Steven Vitiello
- Faculty: 67.0 FTEs
- Grades: 9th-12th
- Enrollment: 587 (as of 2024–25)
- Student to teacher ratio: 8.8:1
- Colors: Green and white
- Athletics conference: Cape-Atlantic League
- Team name: Hawks
- Accreditation: Middle States Association of Colleges and Schools
- Website: www.capemaytech.com

Cape May County Technical High School, located in Middle Township, which provides vocational and technical education to students in ninth through twelfth grades from Cape May County, in the U.S. state of New Jersey, operating as part of the Cape May County Technical School District. The school has been accredited by the Middle States Association of Colleges and Schools Commission on Elementary and Secondary Schools since 2000.

It has a Cape May Court House postal address but is not located in the census-designated place.

As of the 2024–25 school year, the school had an enrollment of 587 students and 67.0 classroom teachers (on an FTE basis), for a student–teacher ratio of 8.8:1. There were 199 students (33.9% of enrollment) eligible for free lunch and 44 (7.5% of students) eligible for reduced-cost lunch.

== Awards, recognition and rankings ==
Schooldigger.com ranked the school 126th out of 381 public high schools statewide in its 2011 rankings (a decrease of 39 positions from the 2010 ranking) which were based on the combined percentage of students classified as proficient or above proficient on the mathematics (81.6%) and language arts literacy (98.6%) components of the High School Proficiency Assessment (HSPA).

== Athletics ==
The Cape May Technical High School Hawks compete in the National Division of the Cape-Atlantic League, an athletic conference that operates under the aegis of the New Jersey State Interscholastic Athletic Association (NJSIAA) and which is comprised of public and private high schools in Atlantic, Cape May, Cumberland, and Gloucester counties. With 476 students in grades 10-12, the school was classified by the NJSIAA for the 2019–20 school year as Group I for most athletic competition purposes, which included schools with an enrollment of 75 to 476 students in that grade range.

== Administration ==
The school's principal is Steven Vitiello. His core administration team includes the assistant principal and athletic director.
