= Middle Township High School =

High school in Cape May County, New Jersey, US

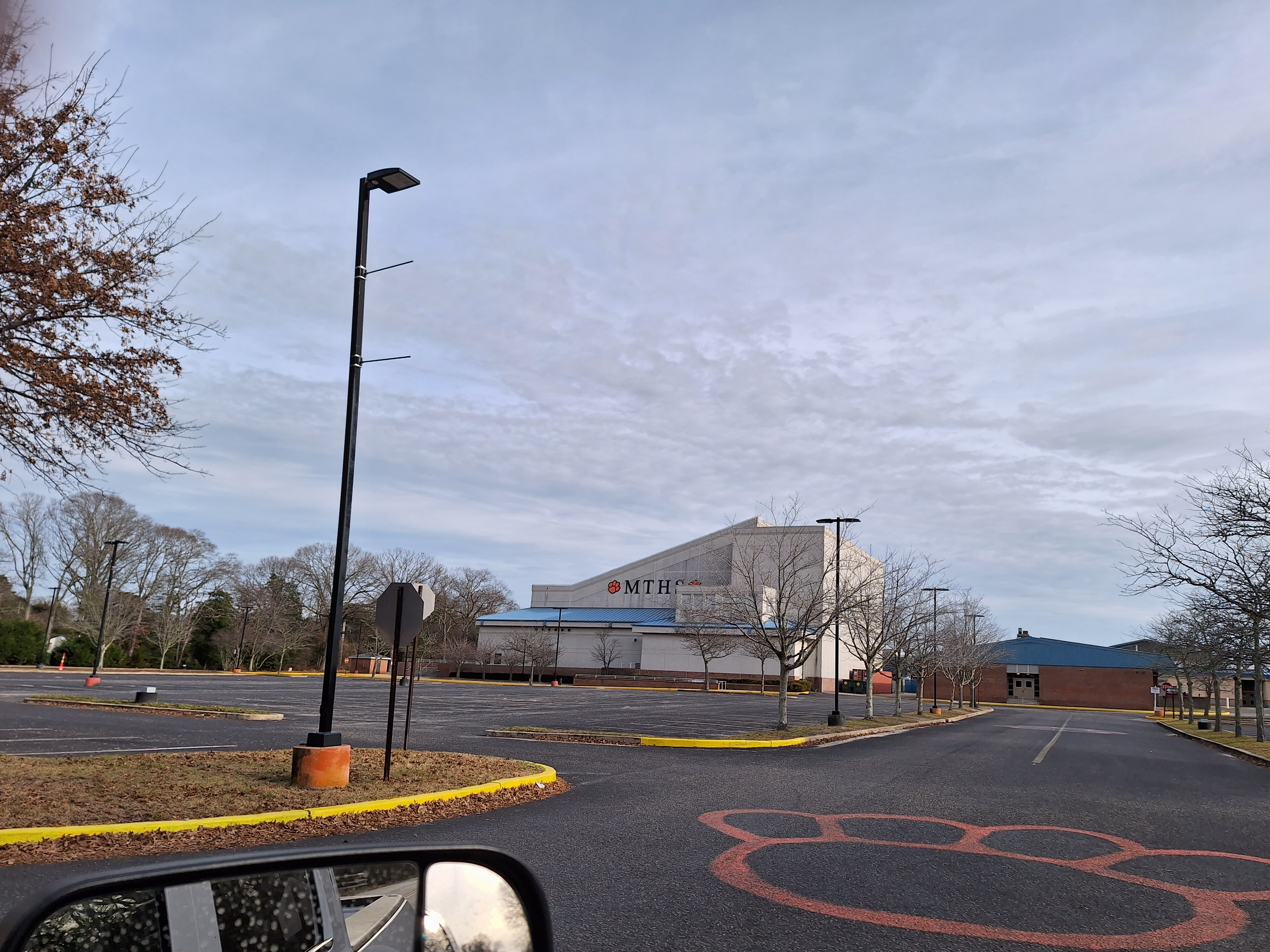

Location
- 300 East Atlantic Avenue; Middle Township, Cape May County, New Jersey 08210; United States; 39.075435°N 74.82098°W

Information
- Type: Public high school
- School district: Middle Township Public Schools
- NCES School ID: 341002001732
- Principal: Sharon Rementer
- Faculty: 68.0 FTEs
- Grades: 9-12
- Enrollment: 821 (as of 2024–25)
- Student to teacher ratio: 12.1:1
- Colors: Orange and Black
- Athletics conference: Cape-Atlantic League (general); West Jersey Football League (football)
- Team name: Panthers
- Website: highschool.middletownshippublicschools.org

Middle Township High School is a four-year public high school that serves students in ninth through twelfth grades from Middle Township in Cape May County, in the U.S. state of New Jersey, operating as part of the Middle Township Public Schools. In addition to students from Middle Township, students from Avalon, Dennis Township, Stone Harbor and Woodbine attend the high school as part of sending/receiving relationships with their respective school districts.

The school is in the Cape May Court House census-designated place.

As of the 2024–25 school year, the school had an enrollment of 821 students and 68.0 classroom teachers (on an FTE basis), for a student–teacher ratio of 12.1:1. There were 341 students (41.5% of enrollment) eligible for free lunch and 54 (6.6% of students) eligible for reduced-cost lunch.

== History ==
By 2013, the high school's enrollment had hit 900 and was declining, as Avalon, Dennis Township, and Stone Harbor were sending fewer students. In 2013, the Woodbine School District changed its receiving high school district from Millville School District to Middle Township district. The first group of 15 ninth graders from Woodbine to be sent to Middle Township High School began attending in fall 2013. Lynda Anderson-Towns, superintendent of the Woodbine district, cited the closer proximity and smaller size of Middle Township High. Millville is 20 miles (32 km) away from Woodbine while Middle Township High School is 12 miles (19 km) away.

== Awards, recognition and rankings ==
The school was the 224th-ranked public high school in New Jersey out of 339 schools statewide in New Jersey Monthly magazine's September 2014 cover story on the state's "Top Public High Schools", using a new ranking methodology. The school had been ranked 194th in the state of 328 schools in 2012, after being ranked 263rd in 2010 out of 322 schools listed. The magazine ranked the school 232nd in 2008 out of 316 schools. The school was ranked 223rd in the magazine's September 2006 issue, which surveyed 316 schools across the state.

== Athletics ==
The Middle Township High School Panthers compete in the National Division of the Cape-Atlantic League, an athletic conference comprised of parochial and public high schools located in Atlantic, Cape May, Cumberland and Gloucester counties, that operates under the aegis of the New Jersey State Interscholastic Athletic Association (NJSIAA). With 588 students in grades 10–12, the school was classified by the NJSIAA for the 2022–24 school years as Group II South for most athletic competition purposes. The football team competes in the Patriot Division of the 94-team West Jersey Football League superconference and was classified by the NJSIAA as Group II South for football for 2024–2026, which included schools with 514 to 685 students.

Interscholastic sports offered at Middle Township High School include:

- Fall sports: Football, Cross Country, Field Hockey, Soccer, Volleyball, Tennis and Cheerleading
- Winter sports: Wrestling, Bowling, Basketball, Swim and Cheerleading
- Spring sports: Baseball, Softball, Lacrosse, Tennis, Track & Field and Golf.

All sports compete at the Varsity and Junior Varsity level. Some sports may offer a freshman team.

The boys basketball team won the Group II state championship in 1993 (defeating runner-up Hillside High School in the finals of the tournament), 1994 (vs. Hillside) and 2002 (vs. Abraham Clark High School). LaMarr Greer had a triple-double to lead the 1993 team to the Group II title with an 81–59 victory against Hillside in the championship game played at the Rutgers Athletic Center. The 1993 team advanced to the Tournament of Champions (ToC) as the third seed, winning the quarterfinals against number-six Perth Amboy Technical High School by a score of 54-39 and taking the semifinals 66–55 over second-seed Irvington High School before falling in the finals to top-seed St. Anthony High School by an 84-59 margin. Greer's 32 points led the 1994 team to its second straight Group II title against Hillside, with a 54–46 victory in the finals. In the 1994 ToC, the team was seeded fifth and fell in the quarterfinals against fourth-seed Piscataway High School by a score of 69–54.

The girls basketball team won the Group II state championship in 1994 (defeating Summit High School in the tournament final) and won the Group III title in 1995 (vs. Sparta High School). The 1994 team won the Group II title with a 59–50 win against Summit in the championship game. In 1995, the team won the Group II state title with a 52–35 win against a Sparta team that came into the championship game undefeated and advanced to the Tournament of Champions as the number three seed and won the quarterfinal round by a score of 46–37 against number-six seed Keyport High School before losing in the semifinals to number-two seed West Milford High School by a score of 63–54, to finish the season with a record of 30–1.

The girls tennis team won the Group III state championship in 1996, defeating Ramapo High School 3–2 in the tournament final.

The field hockey team won the South Jersey Group I state sectional championship in 2016.

== Campus ==
The school includes a labyrinth adjacent to the athletic area. Karen Biederman, an art teacher, established the project in 2018 with the Artists in Education (AIE) Residency Program contributing $10,000 in grant money. Work began in 2019, continued through the COVID-19 pandemic in New Jersey of 2020–2021, and was scheduled to open in 2021. Biederman stated that she decided to advocate for creating a labyrinth after the death of a Rio Grande pupil as she saw the need for an element of peace to comfort grieving students, though she wished to create a labyrinth before that event occurred.

== Marching band ==
The school's marching band was Tournament of Bands Chapter One Champions in 1978 (Group 1), 1980–1982, 1984-1987 (Group 2), 1988-1994 (Group 3) and 1995-2004 (Group 2), having won championships 25 times in a span of 27 years, including a span of 21 consecutive championships. The marching band has been recognized as Atlantic Coast Champion in Group 2 on eleven occasions (1986, 1995, 1997–2003, 2006–2007) and has won the Atlantic Coast Championship in Group 3 four times (1988–1990 and 1992), totaling 15 Atlantic Coast Championships. In the years 2006 through 2008 the marching bands drum line won high percussion at Atlantic coast championships and by doing this retired the drum trophy. The school's indoor color guard was Tournament Indoor Association Scholastic A champions in 1993 and 1998, and Independent A champions in 2000 and 2001.

The school's indoor drumline was Tournament Indoor Association Scholastic A champions in 1998, Scholastic Open champions in 1999 and 2003, and Scholastic World champions from 1985 to 1987.

== Mock trial team ==
Middle Township High School's mock trial team has won state championships in 2007 and in 2011. The team finished 2nd in the first annual American Mock Trial Invitational in 2006, losing by a 5–4 score in the final round. Middle Township participates in the Vincent J. Appruzesse New Jersey High School Mock Trial Competition.

== Administration ==
The principal is Sharon Rementer. The administration team includes three assistant principals.

== Notable alumni ==
- Kevin Bramble (born 1972), disabled ski racer, freeskier and monoski designer / builder
- Megan Compain (born 1975, class of 1993), Olympic basketball player for New Zealand
- Joe Fala (born 1997), soccer player who plays as a defender for New York Red Bulls II in the USL Championship
- Virginia Davis Floyd (born 1951), physician who has worked in public health, foreign policy and the nonprofit sector
- Stedman Graham (born 1951), a 1,000-point scorer for the boys varsity basketball team, educator, author, businessman, speaker and long-time partner of media mogul Oprah Winfrey
- LaMarr Greer (born 1976, class of 1994), retired basketball player who played in the United States Basketball League and the International Basketball League, after leading the school's basketball team to win the NJSIAA Group II state championships in both 1993 and 1994
- Jordan Hall (born 2002), basketball point guard / small forward who played college basketball for the Saint Joseph's Hawks
- Anthony Maher (born 1979), soccer forward who was a member of the United States National Futsal team and a National Team 'pool player' that took part in the 2007 Pan-American Games in Brazil
- Matthew Maher (born 1984), retired soccer defender, who was sentenced to five and a half years in prison for first degree aggravated manslaughter and drunken driving
- Julius H. Taylor (1914–2011, class of 1932), professor emeritus at Morgan State University, who was chairperson of the department of physics
