= Cape May County Technical School District =

School district in Cape May County, New Jersey, US

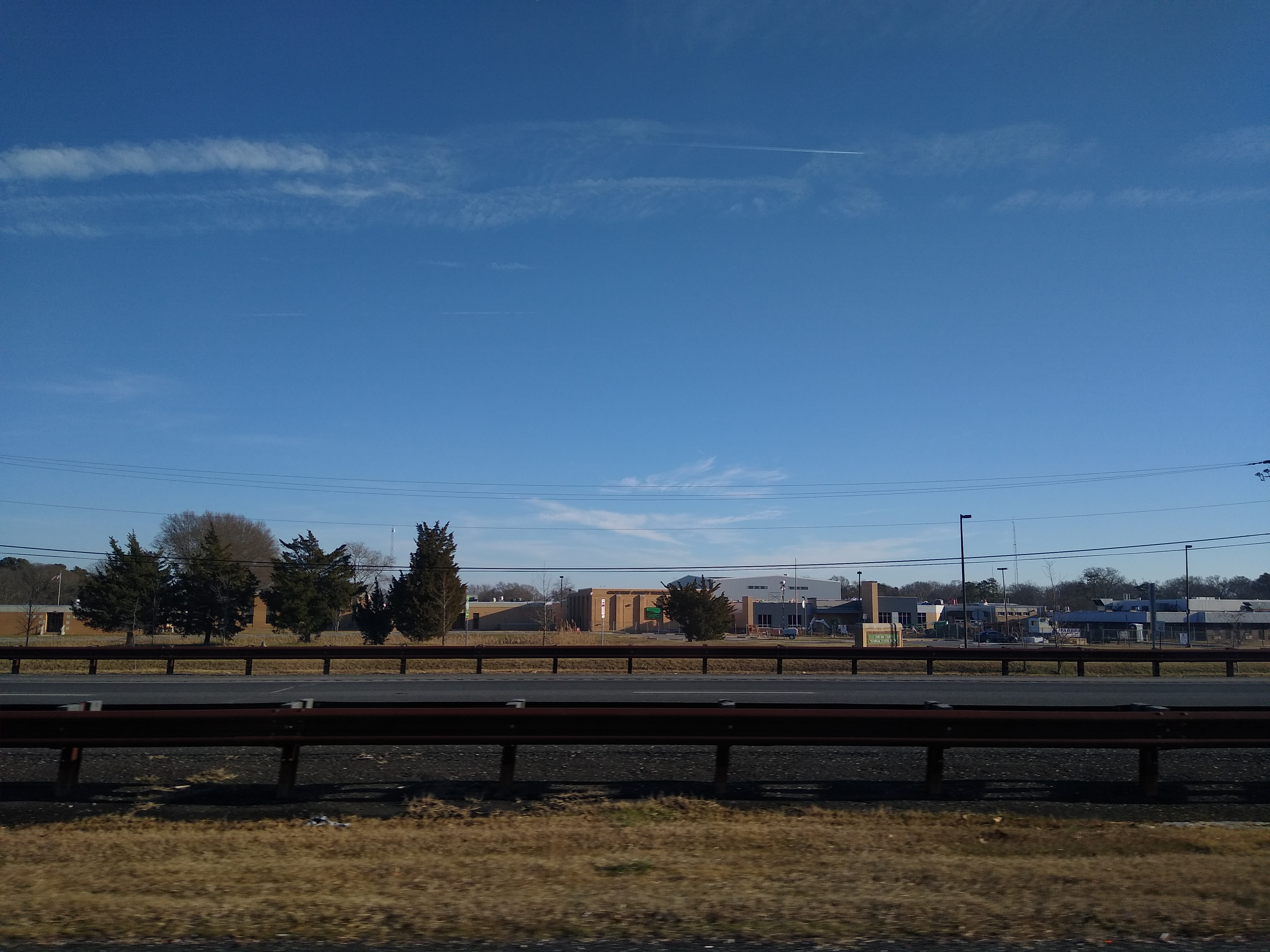

Address
- 188 Crest Haven Road Cape May Court House, Cape May County, New Jersey, 08210; United States
- Coordinates: 39.104796°N 74.795889°W

District information
- Grades: Vocational
- Superintendent: Jamie Moscony
- Business administrator: Lauren Flynn
- Schools: 1

Students and staff
- Enrollment: 590 (as of 2023–24)
- Faculty: 64.0 FTEs
- Student–teacher ratio: 9.2:1

Other information
- Website: www.capemaytech.com
Ind.	Per pupil	District spending	Rank (*)	Vocational average	%± vs. average
1A	Total Spending	$25,287	19	$18,891	33.9%
1	Budgetary Cost	20,043	17	17,296	15.9%
2	Classroom Instruction	10,993	20	9,045	21.5%
6	Support Services	1,973	11	2,269	−13.0%
8	Administrative Cost	2,932	15	2,353	24.6%
10	Operations & Maintenance	3,271	15	3,014	8.5%
13	Extracurricular Activities	556	14	464	19.8%
16	Median Teacher Salary	59,085	6	65,035
Data from NJDoE 2014 Taxpayers' Guide to Education Spending. *Of Vocational districts with any number of students. Lowest spending=1; Highest=21

The Cape May County Technical School District is a regional public school district that offers occupational and academic instruction for public high school and adult students in Cape May County, in the U.S. state of New Jersey. The district and its high school was established in 1915.

As of the 2023–24 school year, the district, comprised of one school, had an enrollment of 589 students and 64.0 classroom teachers (on an FTE basis), for a student–teacher ratio of 9.2:1.

== School ==
Cape May County Technical High School had an enrollment of 553 students as of the 2023–24 school year.

- Steven Vitiello, principal

== Administration ==
Core members of the district's administration are:

- Jamie Moscony, superintendent
- Lauren Flynn, business administrator and board secretary

== Board of education ==
The district's board of education sets policy and oversee the fiscal and educational operation of the district through its administration. The board is comprised of seven members, the county superintendent of schools, who serves on an ex officio basis, and six members who are appointed by the Cape May County Board of County Commissioners to three-year terms of office on a staggered basis, with two member terms up for reappointment and expiring each year. The board appoints a superintendent to oversee the district's day-to-day operations and a business administrator to supervise the business functions of the district.
