= Woodbine, New Jersey =

Borough in Cape May County, New Jersey, US

- Borough
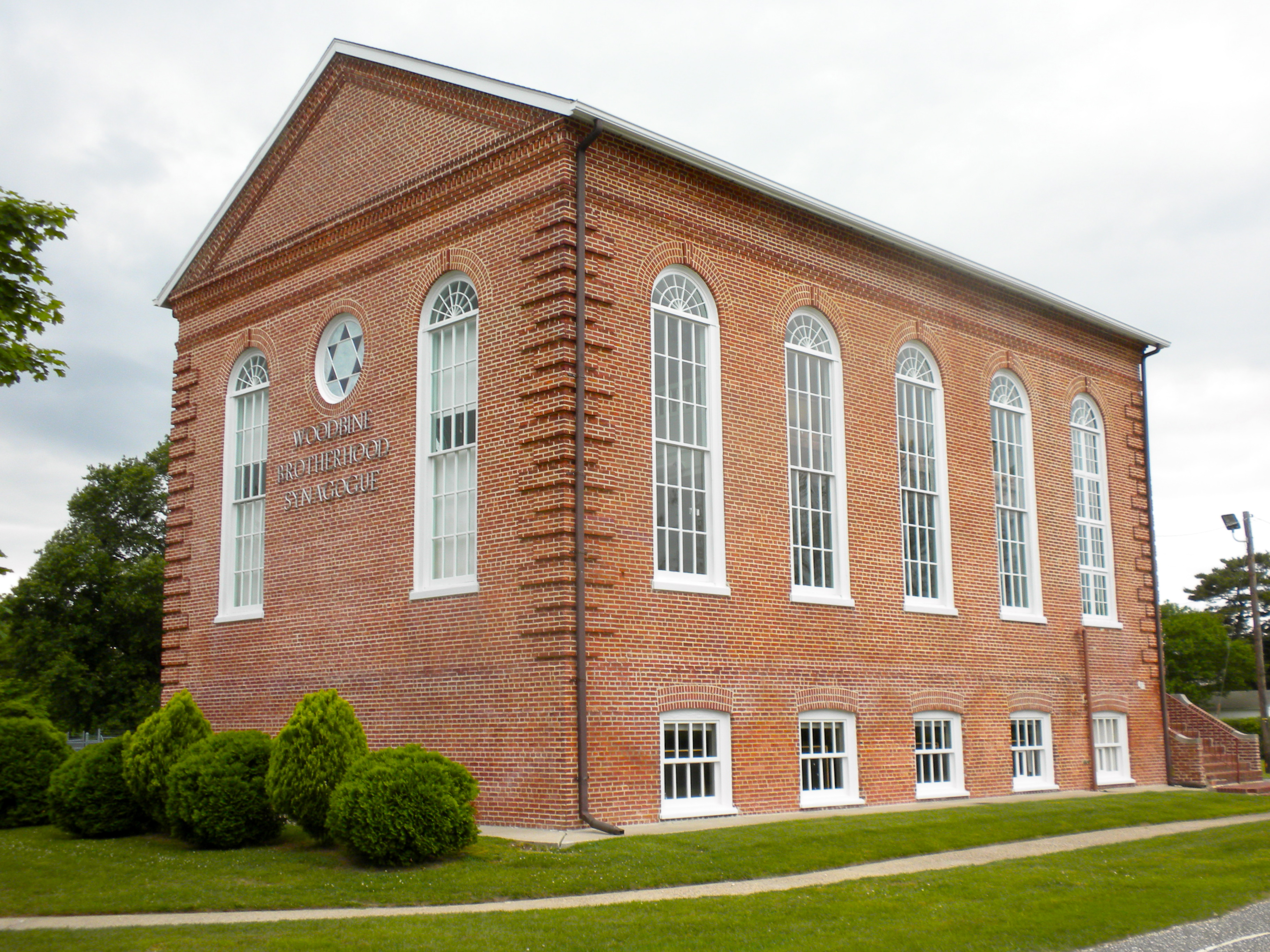
- Woodbine Brotherhood Synagogue

- Seal
- Motto: "Gateway to the Jersey Cape"
- Location of Woodbine in Cape May County highlighted in red (left). Inset map: Location of Cape May County in New Jersey highlighted in orange (right).

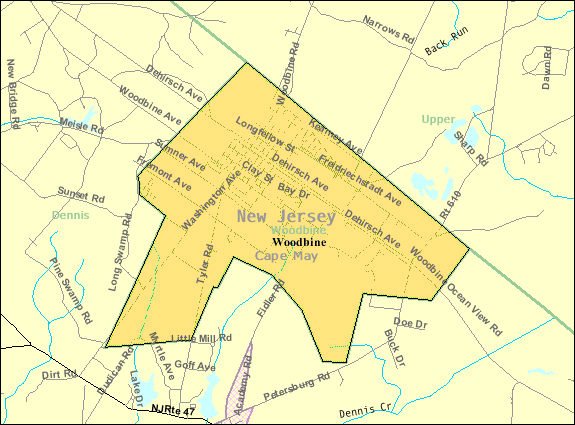
- Census Bureau map of Woodbine, New Jersey

- Location in Cape May County Location in New Jersey Location in the United States
- Coordinates: 39.22835°N 74.809621°W
- Country: United States
- State: New Jersey
- County: Cape May
- Incorporated: March 3, 1903

Government
  - Type: Borough
  - Body: Borough Council
  - Mayor: William Pikolycky (R, term ends December 31, 2026)
  - Municipal clerk: Laurie E. Boyd

Area
  - Total: 8.02 sq mi (20.77 km^{2})
  - Land: 8.02 sq mi (20.77 km^{2})
  - Water: 0 sq mi (0.00 km^{2}) 0.00%
  - Rank: 232nd of 565 in state 6th of 16 in county
- Elevation: 33 ft (10 m)

Population (2020)
  - Total: 2,128
  - Estimate (2023): 2,136
  - Rank: 482nd of 565 in state 10th of 16 in county
  - Density: 265.4/sq mi (102.5/km^{2})
  - Rank: 486th of 565 in state 14th of 16 in county
- Time zone: UTC−05:00 (Eastern (EST))
  - Summer (DST): UTC−04:00 (Eastern (EDT))
- ZIP Code: 08270
- Area code: 609 Exchanges: 628, 861
- FIPS code: 3400981890
- GNIS feature ID: 0885446
- Website: www.boroughofwoodbine.net

Woodbine is a borough in Cape May County, in the U.S. state of New Jersey. The borough, and all of Cape May County, is part of the South Jersey region of the state and of the Ocean City metropolitan statistical area, which is part of the Philadelphia metropolitan area. As of the 2020 United States census, the borough's population was 2,128, a decrease of 344 (−13.9%) from the 2010 census count of 2,472, which in turn reflected a decline of 244 (−9.0%) from the 2,716 counted in the 2000 census.

Woodbine was incorporated as a borough by an act of the New Jersey Legislature on March 3, 1903, from portions of Dennis Township.

== History ==
Woodbine was founded in 1891 as a settlement for Eastern European Jews. The Baron DeHirsch Fund, organized by philanthropist Maurice de Hirsch, purchased 5,300 acres (21 km^{2}) of land in Dennis Township in Cape May County to start a settlement. Immigrants from Poland and Russia were invited to settle the new community. Within two years, they cleared the forest and built a settlement with thriving farms, with 800 acres (3.2 km^{2}) of land set aside as town lots. The residential center of Woodbine still uses the same grid that was originally laid out in 1891. Using modern agricultural practices under the direction of agriculturist and chemist Hirsch Loeb Sabsovich, the first colonists (Woodbine was sometimes called the "Jewish Colony" in the early days) turned Woodbine into a model agricultural community. The Woodbine colony and all other South Jersey Jewish farming colonies actively sought out and encouraged non-Jews to settle in the colony as part of their sociological model. The model was described by Rabbi Moshe Davis as "the continuing quest of the Jewish people to find a more perfect union with lands and peoples of expanding freedom."

Woodbine was incorporated as a borough by an act of the New Jersey Legislature on March 3, 1903, from portions of Dennis Township. Because most of the original settlers were Jewish, Woodbine became known as "the first self-governing Jewish community since the fall of Jerusalem."

The community started the Baron DeHirsch Agricultural College in 1894. Until it was closed during World War I (1917), the college was a model of progressive education. The college and its graduates won many state, national, and international awards. World War I, however, signaled a change in the community from an agricultural economy to one with a light manufacturing economy. The Baron DeHirsch Agricultural College became what is today the Woodbine Developmental Center, a state-run facility for training the mentally handicapped. The Developmental Center is Cape May County's largest employer.

During World War II, the United States Army built an airfield in Woodbine to be used as a training base and as a base for anti-submarine patrols. German U-boats were very active off the East Coast of America, especially off the Jersey coast. Today, Woodbine Municipal Airport is the center of Woodbine's redevelopment efforts.

In 1946 and 1947, the airfield was used for secret night flights of arms and munitions to support the creation of a Jewish State, Israel.

By the 1980s, several of the colony's original buildings had been demolished, including the synagogue situated on the grounds of Woodbine Hospital. The Woodbine Brotherhood Synagogue had also been firebombed and desecrated.

== Geography ==
According to the United States Census Bureau, the borough had a total area of 8.02 square miles (20.77 km^{2}), all of which was land.

The borough borders Dennis Township and Upper Township.

=== Climate ===
The climate in this area is characterized by hot, humid summers and generally mild to cool winters. According to the Köppen Climate Classification system, Woodbine has a humid subtropical climate, abbreviated "Cfa" on climate maps.

== Demographics ==
Historical population
Census	Pop.	Note	%±
1910	2,399		—
1920	1,406		−41.4%
1930	2,164		53.9%
1940	2,111		−2.4%
1950	2,417		14.5%
1960	2,823		16.8%
1970	2,625		−7.0%
1980	2,809		7.0%
1990	2,678		−4.7%
2000	2,716		1.4%
2010	2,472		−9.0%
2020	2,128		−13.9%
2023 (est.)	2,136	▲	0.4%
Population sources:1910–2000 1910–1920 1910 1910–1930; 1940–2000 2000; 2010 2020

=== 2020 census ===
As of the 2020 census, Woodbine had a population of 2,128. The median age was 42.5 years. 23.3% of residents were under the age of 18 and 18.2% of residents were 65 years of age or older. For every 100 females there were 108.8 males, and for every 100 females age 18 and over there were 114.2 males age 18 and over.

0.0% of residents lived in urban areas, while 100.0% lived in rural areas.

There were 727 households in Woodbine, of which 34.5% had children under the age of 18 living in them. Of all households, 36.3% were married-couple households, 20.1% were households with a male householder and no spouse or partner present, and 35.4% were households with a female householder and no spouse or partner present. About 26.2% of all households were made up of individuals and 10.6% had someone living alone who was 65 years of age or older.

There were 999 housing units, of which 27.2% were vacant. The homeowner vacancy rate was 0.7% and the rental vacancy rate was 2.8%.

Racial composition as of the 2020 census
Race	Number	Percent
White	1,102	51.8%
Black or African American	494	23.2%
American Indian and Alaska Native	5	0.2%
Asian	12	0.6%
Native Hawaiian and Other Pacific Islander	0	0.0%
Some other race	200	9.4%
Two or more races	315	14.8%
Hispanic or Latino (of any race)	530	24.9%

=== 2010 census ===
The 2010 United States census counted 2,472 people, 757 households, and 516 families in the borough. The population density was 308.2 per square mile (119.0/km^{2}). There were 1,079 housing units at an average density of 134.5 per square mile (51.9/km^{2}). The racial makeup was 58.21% (1,439) White, 24.72% (611) Black or African American, 0.24% (6) Native American, 0.73% (18) Asian, 0.00% (0) Pacific Islander, 12.30% (304) from other races, and 3.80% (94) from two or more races. Hispanic or Latino of any race were 23.22% (574) of the population.

Of the 757 households, 27.7% had children under the age of 18; 38.0% were married couples living together; 23.4% had a female householder with no husband present and 31.8% were non-families. Of all households, 26.3% were made up of individuals and 9.5% had someone living alone who was 65 years of age or older. The average household size was 2.61 and the average family size was 3.13.

20.6% of the population were under the age of 18, 8.5% from 18 to 24, 24.4% from 25 to 44, 33.4% from 45 to 64, and 13.2% who were 65 years of age or older. The median age was 43.0 years. For every 100 females, the population had 135.0 males. For every 100 females ages 18 and older there were 143.1 males.

The Census Bureau's 2006–2010 American Community Survey showed that (in 2010 inflation-adjusted dollars) median household income was $28,125 (with a margin of error of +/− $7,957) and the median family income was $25,254 (+/− $5,816). Males had a median income of $35,500 (+/− $7,453) versus $31,298 (+/− $9,891) for females. The per capita income for the borough was $15,734 (+/− $2,126). About 33.9% of families and 38.1% of the population were below the poverty line, including 35.8% of those under age 18 and 15.8% of those age 65 or over.

=== 2000 census ===
As of the 2000 United States census there were 2,716 people, 773 households, and 558 families residing in the borough. The population density was 339.6 inhabitants per square mile (131.1/km^{2}). There were 1,080 housing units at an average density of 135.1 per square mile (52.2/km^{2}). The racial makeup of the borough was 53.39% White, 32.40% African American, 0.22% Native American, 0.11% Asian, 11.01% from other races, and 2.87% from two or more races. Hispanic or Latino of any race were 21.24% of the population.

There were 773 households, out of which 41.5% had children under the age of 18 living with them, 39.1% were married couples living together, 27.8% had a female householder with no husband present, and 27.8% were non-families. 23.0% of all households were made up of individuals, and 9.6% had someone living alone who was 65 years of age or older. The average household size was 2.77 and the average family size was 3.21.

In the borough the population was spread out, with 26.6% under the age of 18, 8.0% from 18 to 24, 31.3% from 25 to 44, 23.7% from 45 to 64, and 10.4% who were 65 years of age or older. The median age was 36 years. For every 100 females, there were 142.5 males. For every 100 females age 18 and over, there were 158.2 males.

The median income for a household in the borough was $30,298, and the median income for a family was $31,786. Males had a median income of $30,139 versus $24,150 for females. The per capita income for the borough was $13,335. About 18.8% of families and 17.9% of the population were below the poverty line, including 23.9% of those under age 18 and 11.6% of those age 65 or over.

== Government ==
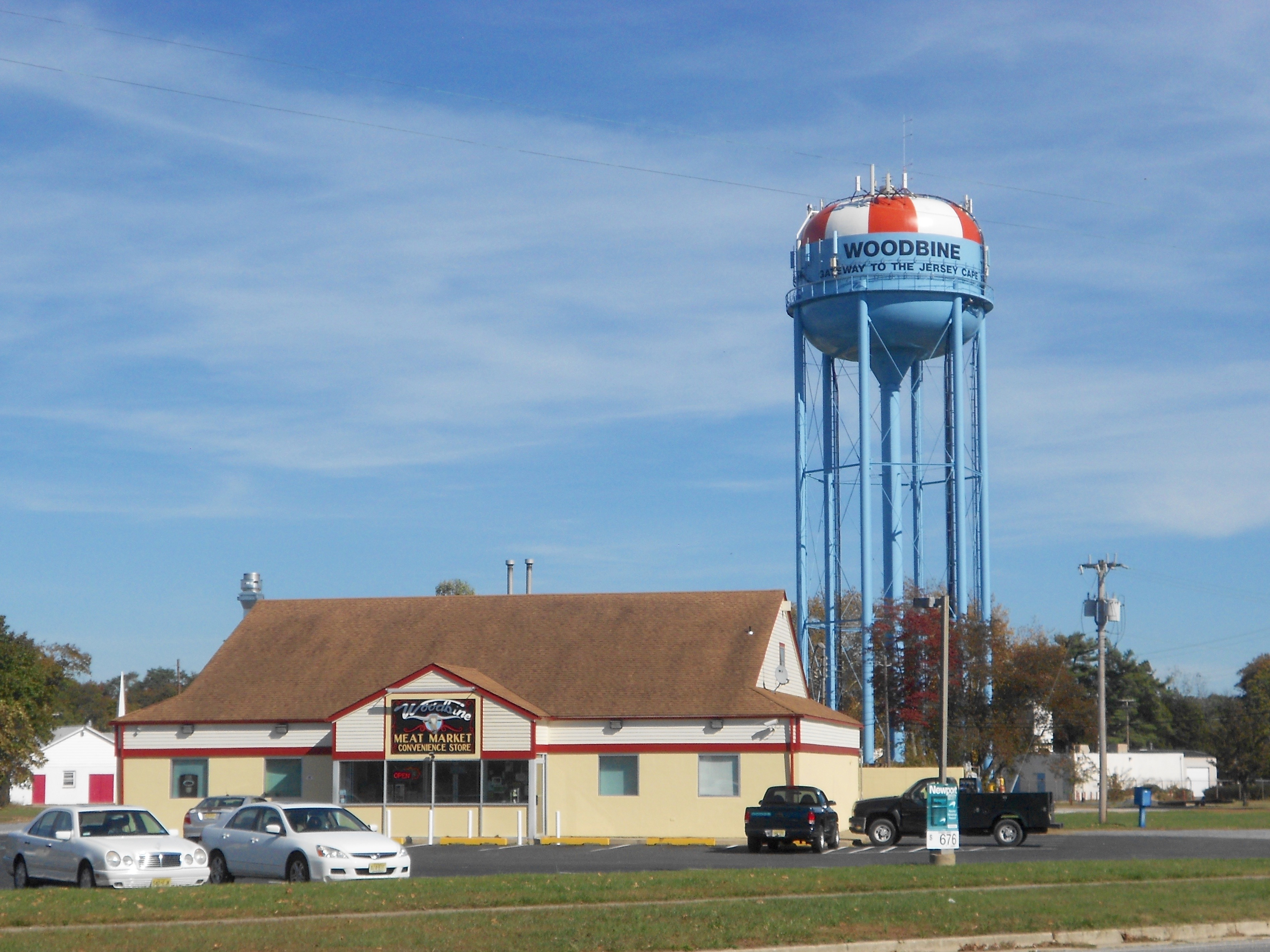
Watertower

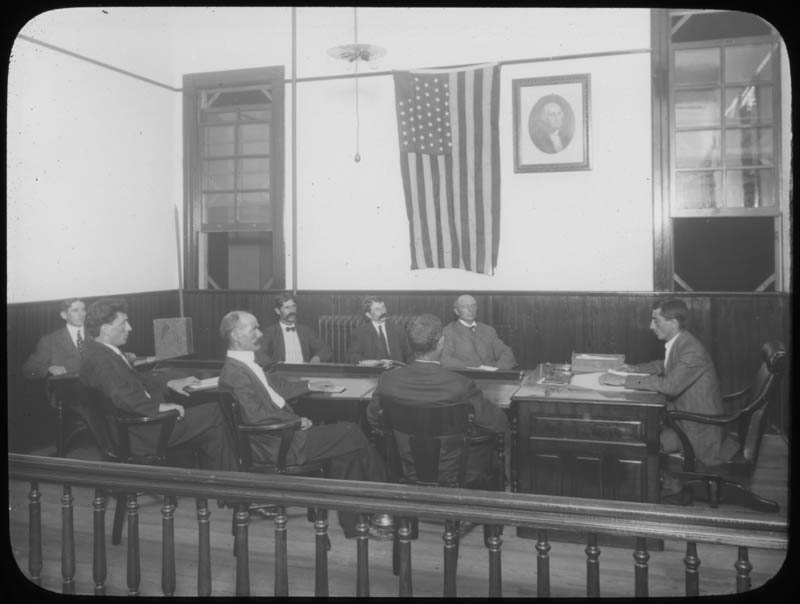
A political meeting in Woodbine c. 1890s

=== Local government ===
Woodbine is governed under the borough form of New Jersey municipal government, which is used in 218 municipalities (of the 564) statewide, making it the most common form of government in New Jersey. The governing body is comprised of the mayor and the borough council, with all positions elected at-large on a partisan basis as part of the November general election. A mayor is elected directly by the voters to a four-year term of office. The borough council includes six members elected to serve three-year terms on a staggered basis, with two seats coming up for election each year in a three-year cycle. The borough form of government used by Woodbine is a "weak mayor / strong council" government in which council members act as the legislative body with the mayor presiding at meetings and voting only in the event of a tie. The mayor can veto ordinances subject to an override by a two-thirds majority vote of the council. The mayor makes committee and liaison assignments for council members, and most appointments are made by the mayor with the advice and consent of the council.

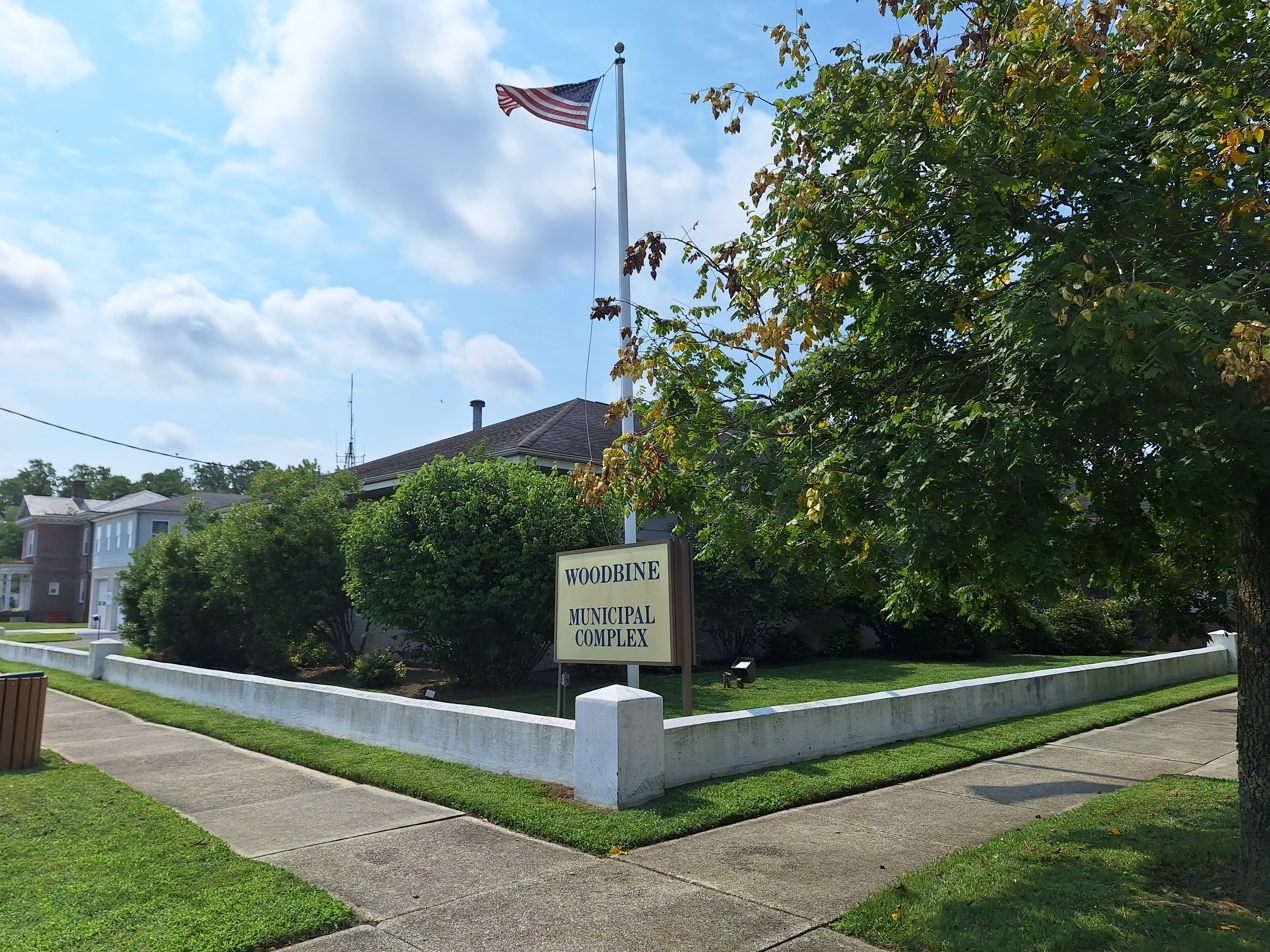
Borough hall

As of 2026, the mayor of Woodbine is Republican William Pikolycky, whose term of office ends on December 31, 2026. The members of the Woodbine Borough Council are David Bennet (R, 2026), Hector L. Cruz (R, 2026), Joseph E. Johnson III (R, 2027), Eduardo Ortiz (R, 2028), Mary Helen Perez (R, 2028) and Barbara Prettyman (R, 2027).

In 2018, the borough had an average property tax bill of $1,947, the lowest in the county, compared to an average bill of $4,301 in Cumberland County and $8,767 statewide.

=== Federal, state and county representation ===
Woodbine is located in the 2nd Congressional District and is part of New Jersey's 1st state legislative district.

For the 119th United States Congress, New Jersey's 2nd congressional district is represented by Jeff Van Drew (R, Dennis Township). New Jersey is represented in the United States Senate by Democrats Cory Booker (Newark, term ends 2027) and Andy Kim (Moorestown, term ends 2031).

For the 2026–2027 session, the 1st legislative district of the New Jersey Legislature is represented in the State Senate by Mike Testa (R, Vineland) and in the General Assembly by Antwan McClellan (R, Ocean City) and Erik K. Simonsen (R, Lower Township).

Cape May County is governed by a five-person Board of County Commissioners whose members are elected at-large on a partisan basis to three-year terms of office on a staggered basis, with either one or two seats coming up for election each year; At an annual reorganization held each January, the commissioners select one member to serve as director and another to serve as vice-director. As of 2026, Cape May County's Commissioners are Director Leonard C. Desiderio (R, Sea Isle City, term as commissioner ends December 31, 2027; term as director ends 2026), Vice-Director Andrew Bulakowski (R, Lower Township; term as commissioner ends 2028; term as vice-director ends 2026). Robert Barr (R, Ocean City; 2028) and Will Morey (R, Wildwood Crest; 2026), with one seat expiring in December 2026 vacant after Melanie Collette resigned from office in March 2026. The county's constitutional officers are Clerk Rita Marie Rothberg (R, Ocean City; 2030), Sheriff Robert Nolan (R, Lower Township; 2026) and Surrogate E. Marie Hayes (R, Ocean City; 2028).

=== Politics ===
As of March 2011, there were a total of 1,470 registered voters in Woodbine, of which 286 (19.5%) were registered as Democrats, 537 (36.5%) were registered as Republicans and 647 (44.0%) were registered as Unaffiliated. There were no voters registered to other parties.

Gubernatorial election results for Woodbine
Year	Republican		Democratic		Third party(ies)	
Year	No.	%	No.	%	No.	%
2025	286	49.06%	293	50.26%	4	0.69%
2021	251	50.81%	241	48.79%	2	0.40%
2017	145	34.36%	268	63.51%	9	2.13%
2013	302	49.27%	284	46.33%	27	4.40%
2009	246	32.03%	476	61.98%	46	5.99%
2005	167	28.16%	379	63.91%	47	7.93%

In the 2012 presidential election, Democrat Barack Obama received 71.6% of the vote (641 cast), ahead of Republican Mitt Romney with 27.4% (245 votes), and other candidates with 1.0% (9 votes), among the 917 ballots cast by the borough's 1,410 registered voters (22 ballots were spoiled), for a turnout of 65.0%. In the 2008 presidential election, Democrat Barack Obama received 66.4% of the vote (708 cast), ahead of Republican John McCain, who received 29.8% (318 votes), with 1,066 ballots cast among the borough's 1,386 registered voters, for a turnout of 76.9%. In the 2004 presidential election, Democrat John Kerry received 59.0% of the vote (526 ballots cast), outpolling Republican George W. Bush, who received around 38.6% (344 votes), with 891 ballots cast among the borough's 1,344 registered voters, for a turnout percentage of 66.3.

Presidential elections results
Year	Republican	Democratic
2024	47.6% 384	50.3% 406
2020	41.3% 375	58.0% 527
2016	37.5% 302	59.4% 479
2012	27.4% 245	71.6% 641
2008	29.8% 318	66.4% 708
2004	38.6% 344	59.0% 526

In the 2013 gubernatorial election, Republican Chris Christie received 49.3% of the vote (302 cast), ahead of Democrat Barbara Buono with 46.3% (284 votes), and other candidates with 4.4% (27 votes), among the 793 ballots cast by the borough's 1,387 registered voters (180 ballots were spoiled), for a turnout of 57.2%. In the 2009 gubernatorial election, Democrat Jon Corzine received 56.5% of the vote (476 ballots cast), ahead of both Republican Chris Christie with 29.2% (246 votes) and Independent Chris Daggett with 3.3% (28 votes), with 842 ballots cast among the borough's 1,540 registered voters, yielding a 54.7% turnout.

United States Senate election results for Woodbine1
Year	Republican		Democratic		Third party(ies)	
Year	No.	%	No.	%	No.	%
2024	346	49.57%	338	48.42%	14	2.01%
2018	271	46.01%	284	48.22%	34	5.77%
2012	197	28.84%	467	68.37%	19	2.78%
2006	248	41.26%	314	52.25%	39	6.49%

United States Senate election results for Woodbine2
Year	Republican		Democratic		Third party(ies)	
Year	No.	%	No.	%	No.	%
2020	320	39.80%	466	57.96%	18	2.24%
2014	179	41.34%	240	55.43%	14	3.23%
2013	87	32.58%	170	63.67%	10	3.75%
2008	224	33.19%	422	62.52%	29	4.30%

== Education ==
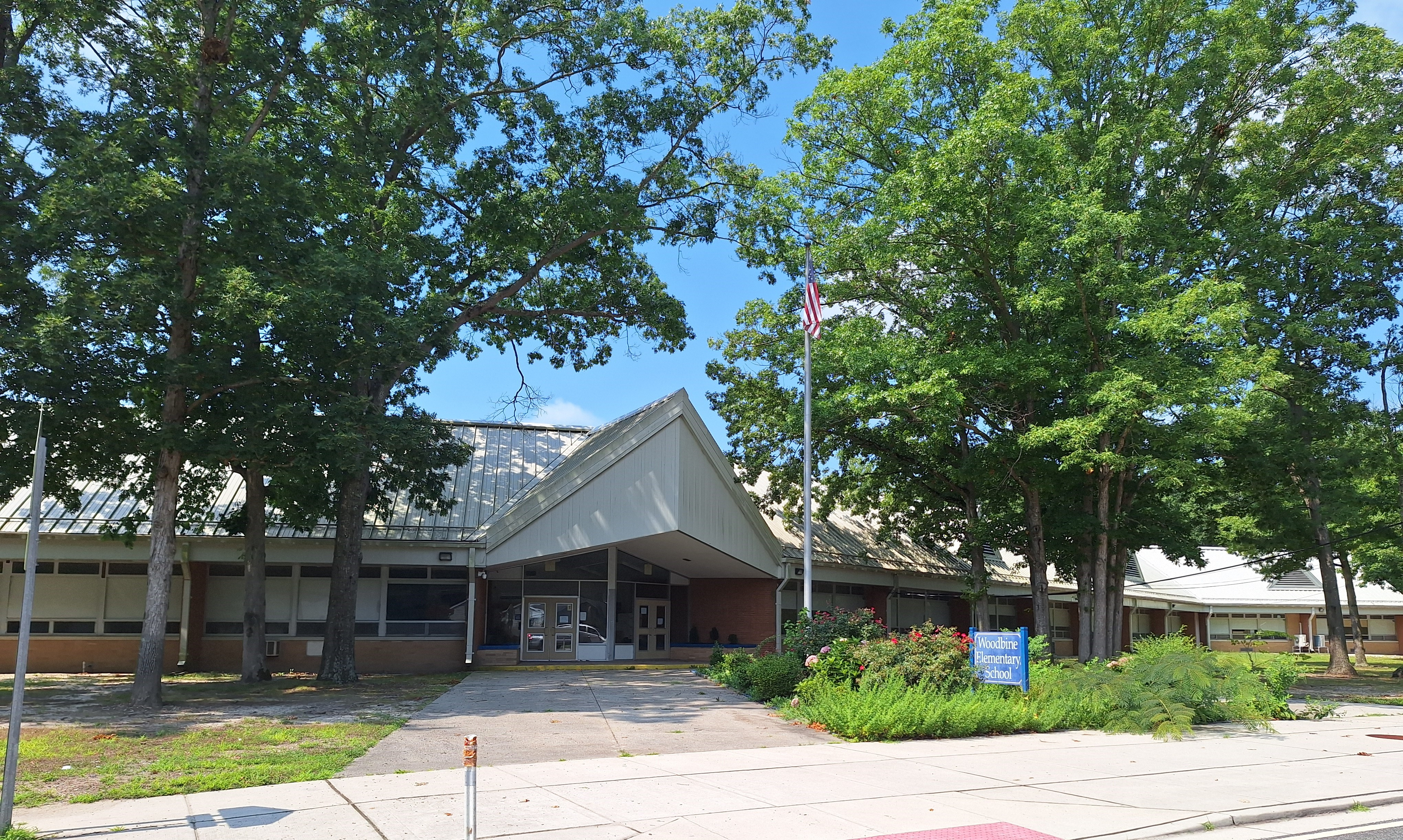
Woodbine Elementary School

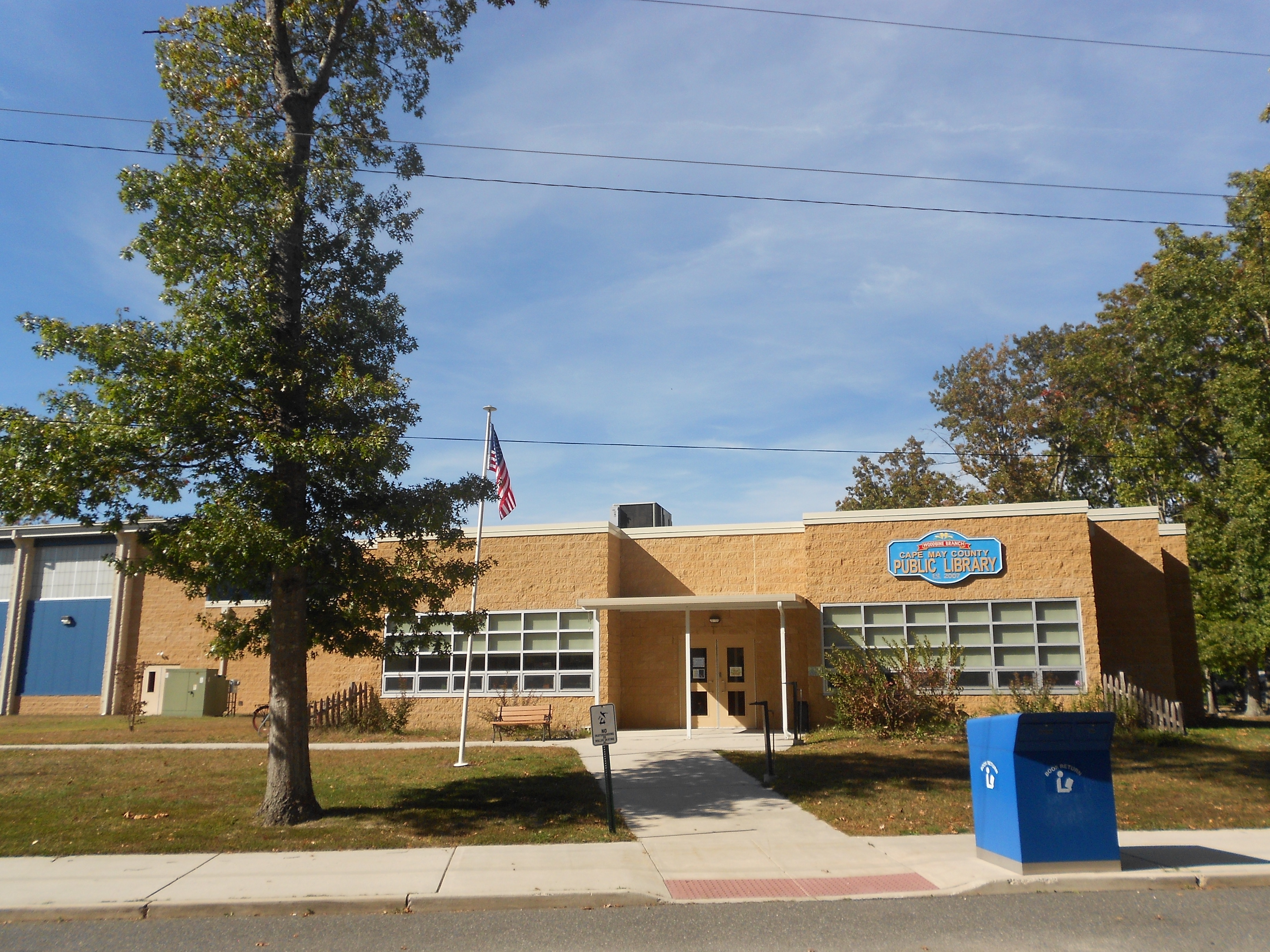
Woodbine branch of the Cape May Public Library, which is a part of the school property

The Woodbine School District serves students in public school for pre-kindergarten through eighth grade at Woodbine Elementary School. As of the 2022–23 school year, the district, comprised of one school, had an enrollment of 239 students and 29.0 classroom teachers (on an FTE basis), for a student–teacher ratio of 8.2:1.

Public school students in ninth through twelfth grades attend Middle Township High School as part of a sending/receiving relationship that began with the 2013–14 school year; students from Avalon, Dennis Township and Stone Harbor also attend the school. As of the 2022–23 school year, the high school had an enrollment of 790 students and 65.0 classroom teachers (on an FTE basis), for a student–teacher ratio of 12.2:1. In previous eras prior to 2013, students were sent to Millville Senior High School; after 2013, attendance at Middle Township High was phased in.

Students are also eligible to attend Cape May County Technical High School in Cape May Court House, which serves students from the entire county in its comprehensive and vocational programs, which are offered without charge to students who are county residents. Special needs students may be referred to Cape May County Special Services School District in the Cape May Court House area.

The Roman Catholic Diocese of Camden operates Bishop McHugh Regional School, a Catholic K–8 school, in the Ocean View area, in Dennis Township, which has a Cape May Court House postal address. It is the parish school of Marmora/Woodbine Catholic Church and three other churches.

The Cape May County Public Library operates the Woodbine Branch.

== Infrastructure ==
The Cape May County Municipal Utilities Authority's Sanitary Landfill is in Woodbine.

== Transportation ==
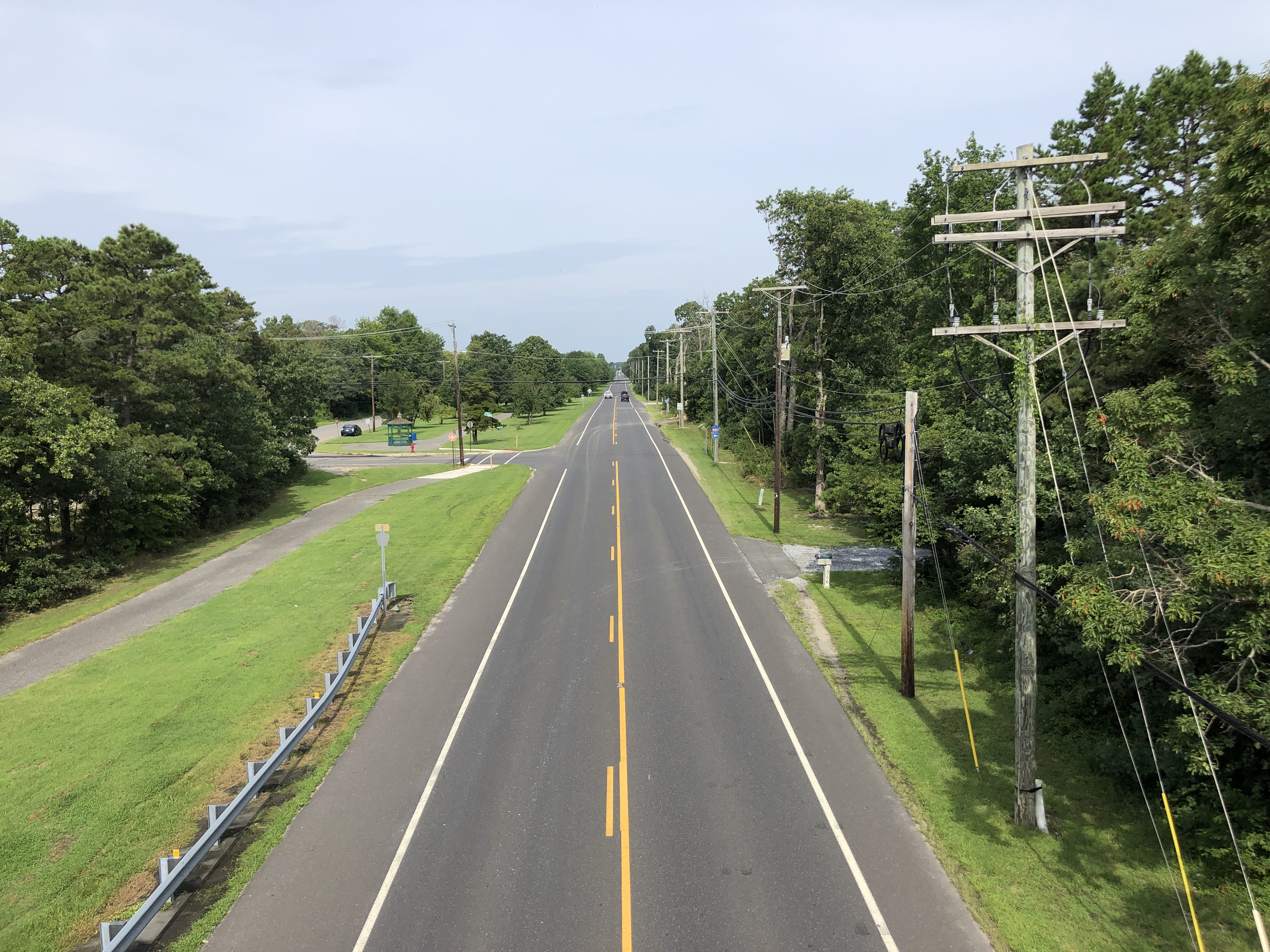
County Route 550 westbound in Woodbine

=== Roads and highways ===
As of May 2010, the borough had a total of 32.45 miles (52.22 km) of roadways, of which 19.61 miles (31.56 km) were maintained by the municipality and 12.84 miles (20.66 km) by Cape May County.

No Interstate, U.S. or state highways traverse Woodbine. The most significant roads serving the borough are County Route 550 and County Route 557.

=== Public transportation ===
NJ Transit offers the 313 inter-city bus route that runs between Cape May and Philadelphia.

== Culture ==
Stockton University maintains the Sam Azeez Museum of Woodbine Heritage, located in the Woodbine Brotherhood Synagogue.

== Notable people ==
People who were born in, residents of, or otherwise closely associated with Woodbine include:

- Samuel Gallu (1918–1991), writer and producer and director of film and television
- Bubba Green (born 1957), former defensive lineman who played in the NFL for one season for the Baltimore Colts
- Jacob Goodale Lipman (1874–1939), professor of agricultural chemistry and researcher in the fields of soil chemistry and bacteriology
- Calvin Murray (born 1958), running back who played in the NFL for the Philadelphia Eagles
- Gregory Goodwin Pincus (1903–1967), biologist and researcher who co-invented the combined oral contraceptive pill
- Joseph Rabinowitz, founder of the Woodbine Children's Clothing Company, the community's largest employer, who was elected at age 37 in 1910 as third mayor of Woodbine; his descendants include grandson, Jay Rabinowitz, former chief justice of the Supreme Court of Alaska; Robert Rabinowitz, creator of Beatlemania, clinical psychologist Barrie R. Cassileth and Olympic athlete Judy Rabinowitz
- Herman Rosenthal (1843–1917), author, editor and librarian
- Hirsch Loeb Sabsovich (1860–1921), agronomist, chemist and agricultural educator who served as the first mayor of Woodbine
- Red Weiner (1911–1988), multi-sport professional athlete and coach, who played in the NFL for the Philadelphia Eagles
