= New Jersey Schools Development Authority =

State agency of New Jersey, United States

State of New Jersey Schools Development Authority

Agency overview
- Formed: 2007
- Preceding agency: New Jersey Schools Construction Corporation
- Jurisdiction: New Jersey
- Headquarters: 32 East Front Street, Trenton, NJ 08625
- Agency executive: Manuel M. Da Silva, Chief Executive Officer
- Website: http://www.njsda.gov/

The New Jersey Schools Development Authority (commonly referred to as NJSDA or SDA) is the State agency responsible for fully funding and managing the new construction, modernization and renovation of school facilities projects in 31 New Jersey school districts known as the ‘SDA Districts’. It is an independent authority, in but not of the New Jersey Department of the Treasury.

Other responsibilities of the Authority include renovations and repairs deemed to be ‘Emergent projects’ by the New Jersey Department of Education due to potential health and safety reasons, and grant funding in Regular Operating Districts (ROD) that address health and safety issues and other critical needs. The SDA administers grants, with a minimum state share of 40 percent of eligible project costs to RODs, which manage their projects.

The SDA opened four new or renovated facilities in September 2018, representing a state investment of more than $198 million. This included the James Madison Elementary School No. 10 in Garfield (New School), Paul Robeson Community Theme School for the Arts in New Brunswick (Addition/Renovation project), South Street Elementary School in Newark (New School) and the Sgt. Dominick Pilla Middle School in Vineland (New School).

In 1998, the New Jersey Supreme Court ruled in the Abbott v. Burke case that the State must provide 100 percent funding for all school renovation and construction projects in special-needs school districts. According to the Court, aging, unsafe and overcrowded buildings prevented children from receiving the "thorough and efficient" education required under the New Jersey Constitution. In response, the New Jersey Educational Facilities Construction and Financing Act was enacted on July 18, 2000, launching the School Construction Program. Full funding for approved projects was authorized for the 31 special-needs districts, known as 'Abbott Districts'. In addition, grants totaling 40 percent of eligible costs were made available to the remaining school districts across the state.

The SDA is governed by an 11-member board of directors who are nominated by the Governor and confirmed by the Senate.

Lizette Delgado Polanco succeeded previous CEO Charles McKenna in August 2018 and served until April 2019.

In April 2019, Governor Phil Murphy’s Administration named Manuel Da Silva as the Interim CEO of the New Jersey Schools Development Authority. On May 1, 2019, the SDA Board of Directors approved Mr. Da Silva as the Authority’s Interim CEO.

== Schools Construction Corporation ==
The SCC was created on July 18, 2000 when the New Jersey Educational Facilities Construction and Financing Act was signed into law. The law created a program for financing, design, renovation, repair and new construction of primary and secondary schools in New Jersey. The law significantly changed the level of State aid for public school construction. Previously, school districts received State aid for construction debt at the same percentage as their State aid for operating costs, making almost half of the State's school districts ineligible for any construction aid. The new law guaranteed construction aid for every school district in New Jersey. The minimum level of aid was 40%, and Abbott Districts received 100% of eligible costs.
