= Cape May County Park & Zoo =

Zoo in New Jersey, United States

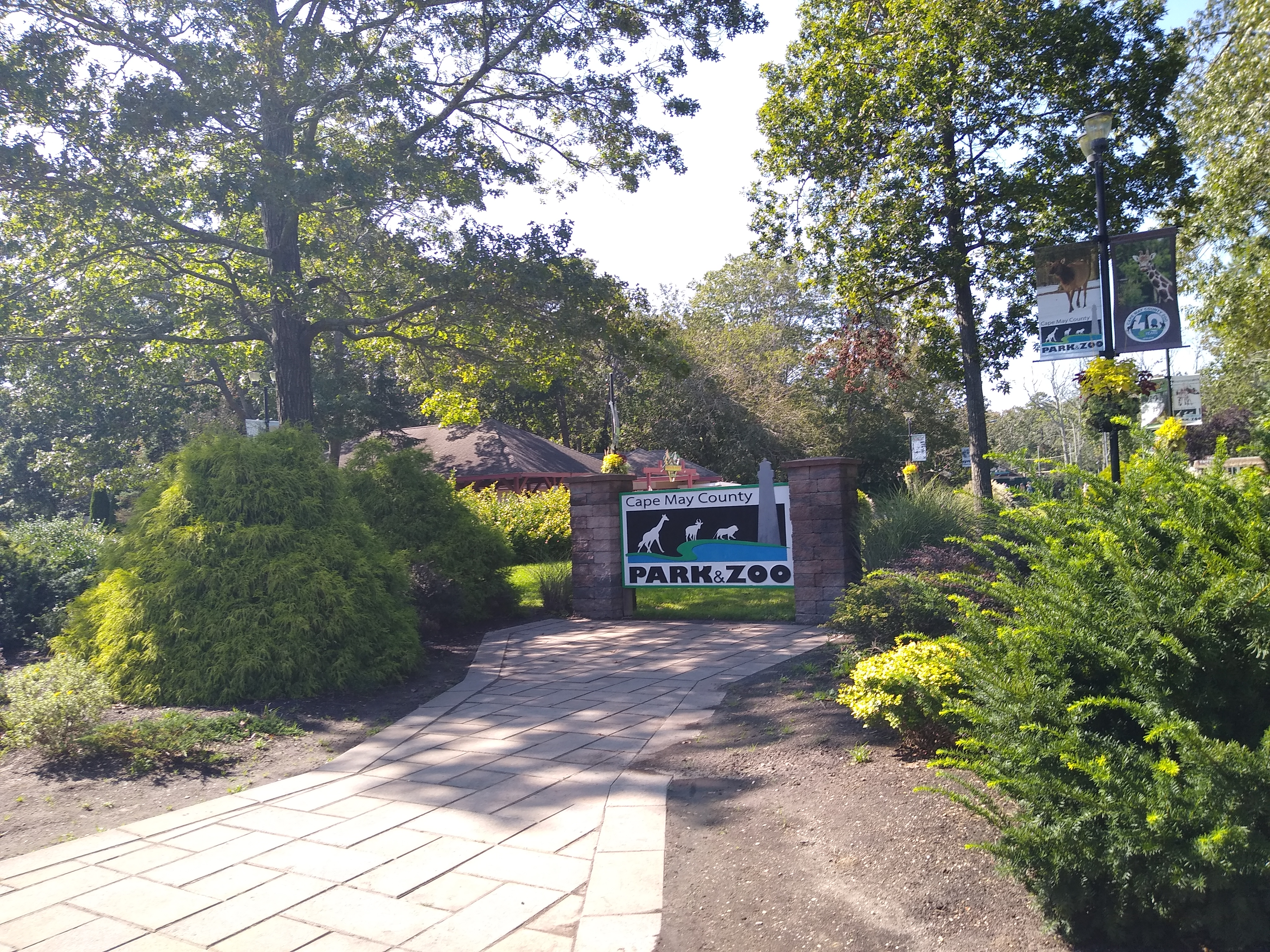
- Interactive map of Cape May County Park & Zoo
- 39.1025°N 74.8154°W
- Date opened: 1942 (park), 1978 (zoo)
- Location: Cape May Court House, New Jersey, U.S.
- Land area: 200 acres (81 ha) (Park Central)
- No. of animals: 550
- No. of species: 250
- Annual visitors: 620,000
- Memberships: Association of Zoos and Aquariums, Zoological Association of America
- Website: www.cmczoo.com

The Cape May County Park & Zoo in the Cape May Court House section of Middle Township, New Jersey, provides free year-round admission to a collection of more than 550 animals representing 250 species in 85 acres (34 ha) of exhibits. The zoo is located at 707 U.S. Route 9 North, in the center of Cape May County's Central Park. Together, the zoo and the park cover about 220 acres (89 ha). The zoo began operation in 1978. Its principal exhibit areas are a 57-acre (23 ha) African Savanna, a free-flight aviary, and a reptile collection.

The zoo is open every day except for Christmas, weather permitting. The hours of operation are from 10:00 am until 3:30 pm in the winter and 10:00 am until 4:30 pm in the summer. Time changes occur with daylight saving time. The zoo has a carousel with zoo animals for riding seats, unlike the traditional horses on most carousels.

Cape May County Zoological Society/ZooFriends, a 501(c)3 non-profit NJ corporation, is the official support organization of the Cape May County Park & Zoo. Since 1986, it has continuously provided the private sector funding needed to develop new exhibits, improve facilities, purchase zoo equipment and make acquisitions for the animal collection. The Society makes significant contributions to conservation and endeavors to encourage the community's interest and enjoyment of the zoo.

== History ==
In 1942, a 40 acres (16 ha) area of wooded land, formerly a plantation owned by the Matthews family, was donated to Cape May County. The area later housed the 4-H fair. In 1967, the Cape May Park Commission was established to maintain the county's parks. The land originally donated in 1942 became Park Central, which eventually increased in size to 200 acres (81 ha). In 1978, the Cape May County Park & Zoo was created within Park Central.

In the February 5–6, 2010 North American blizzard, the enclosure of the bald eagle habitat was destroyed by the heavy snowfall. It has since been rebuilt.

The Walter Trettin Snow Leopard Habitat was completed in 2016.

In 2024, frequent visitor Charles Muller bequeathed 1.4 million dollars to the zoo, the largest single donation in the zoo's history.

== Reputation ==
The zoo was voted the 13th best zoo in the world and the 5th best zoo in the United States in TripAdvisor's Traveler's Choice 2015. TripAdvisor also named the zoo the 3rd best in the nation in 2012.

== Conservation ==
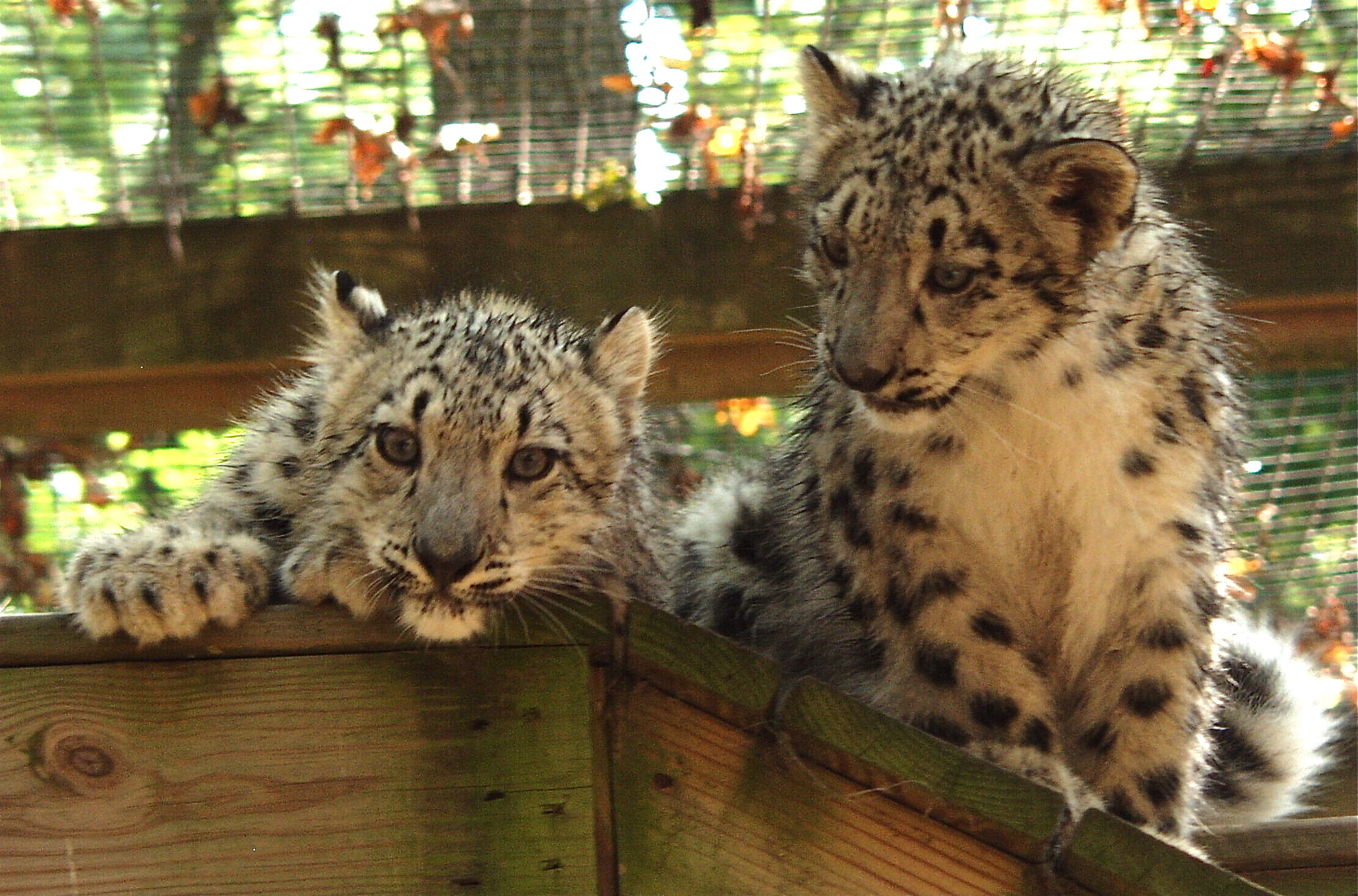
Kaba and Sabu, first snow leopards born at the zoo

The zoo is accredited by the Association of Zoos and Aquariums (AZA), and participates in a number of its species survival programs. In particular, a mountain bongo antelope from the zoo's collection was sent to the Mount Kenya World Heritage Site in 2004 to join a captive breeding population intended to reestablish a wild population in future generations.

On May 10, 2010, the Cape May County Zoo welcomed two snow leopard cubs born to parents Himani and Vijay. They are the first snow leopard cubs born at the zoo, and the first cubs for mother ‘Himani’. Only eleven snow leopards were born and survived last year in the United States. The two male cubs, Kaba and Sabu, are part of the AZA Species Survival Plan (SSP) Program. The program's mission is to cooperatively manage specific, and typically threatened or endangered species populations within AZA-accredited zoos and aquariums. Kaba now resides at the Seneca Park Zoo in Rochester, and Sabu is at the Brookfield Zoo in Chicago.

== Gallery ==
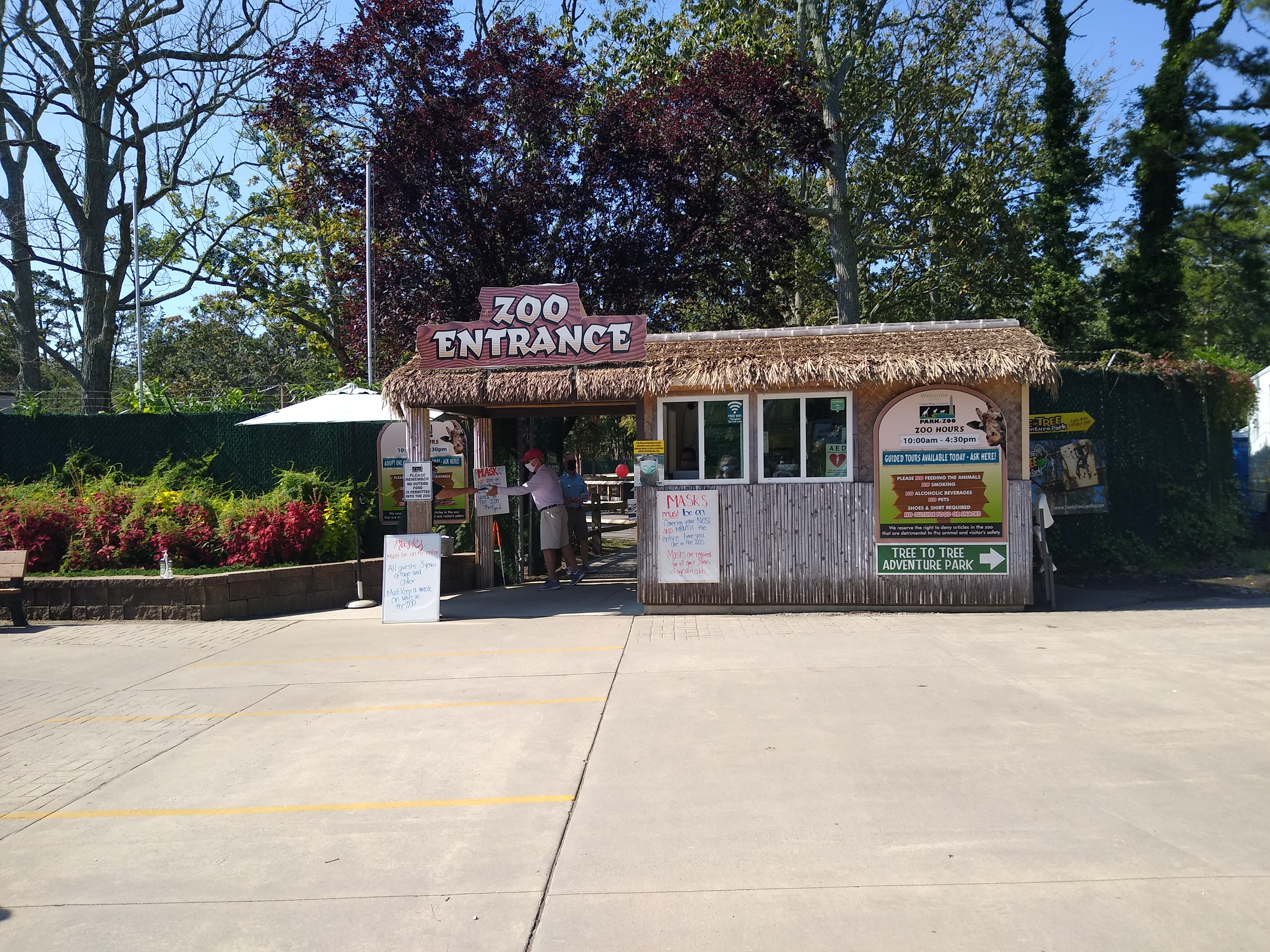
Zoo entrance.

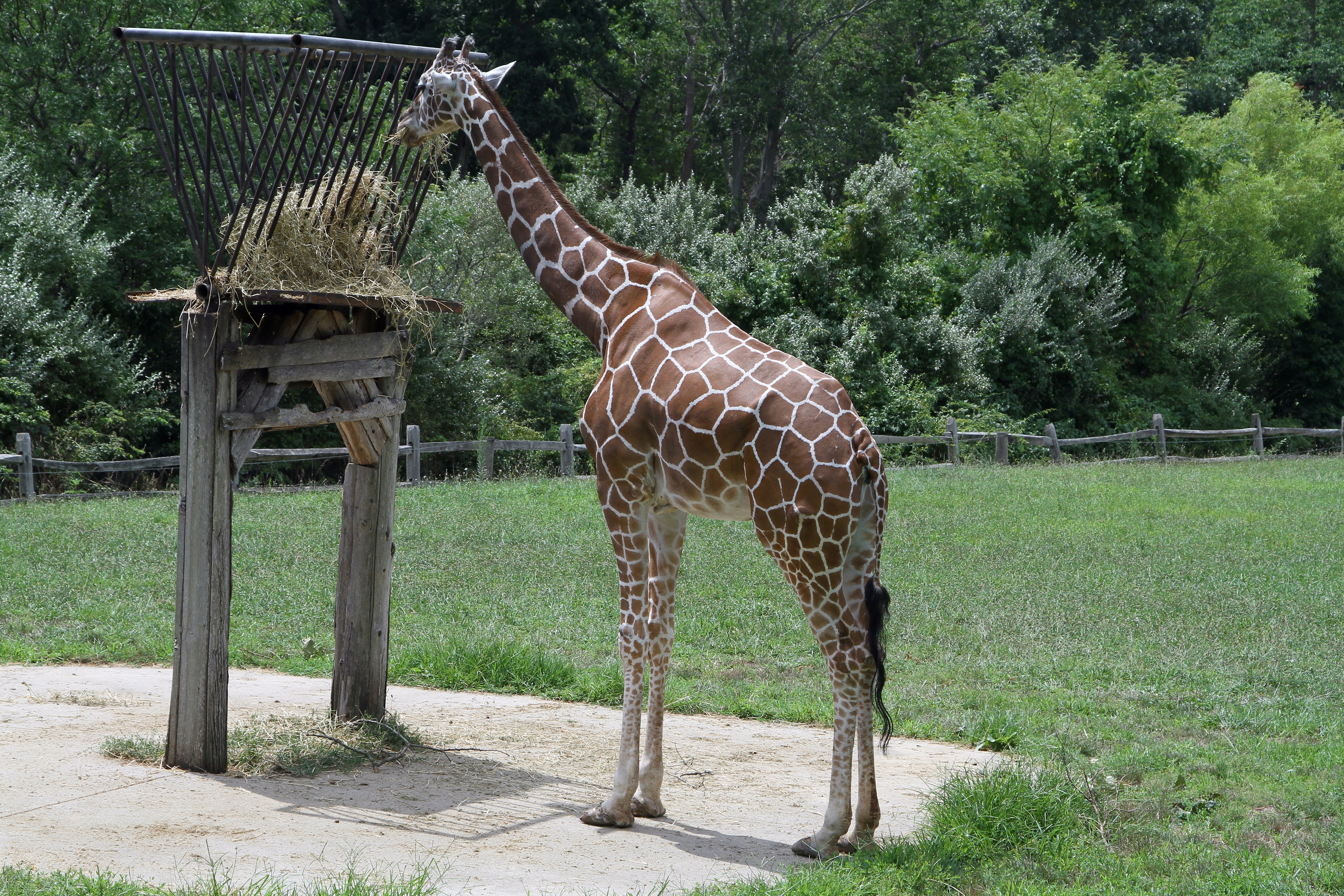
Giraffe at a feeding station

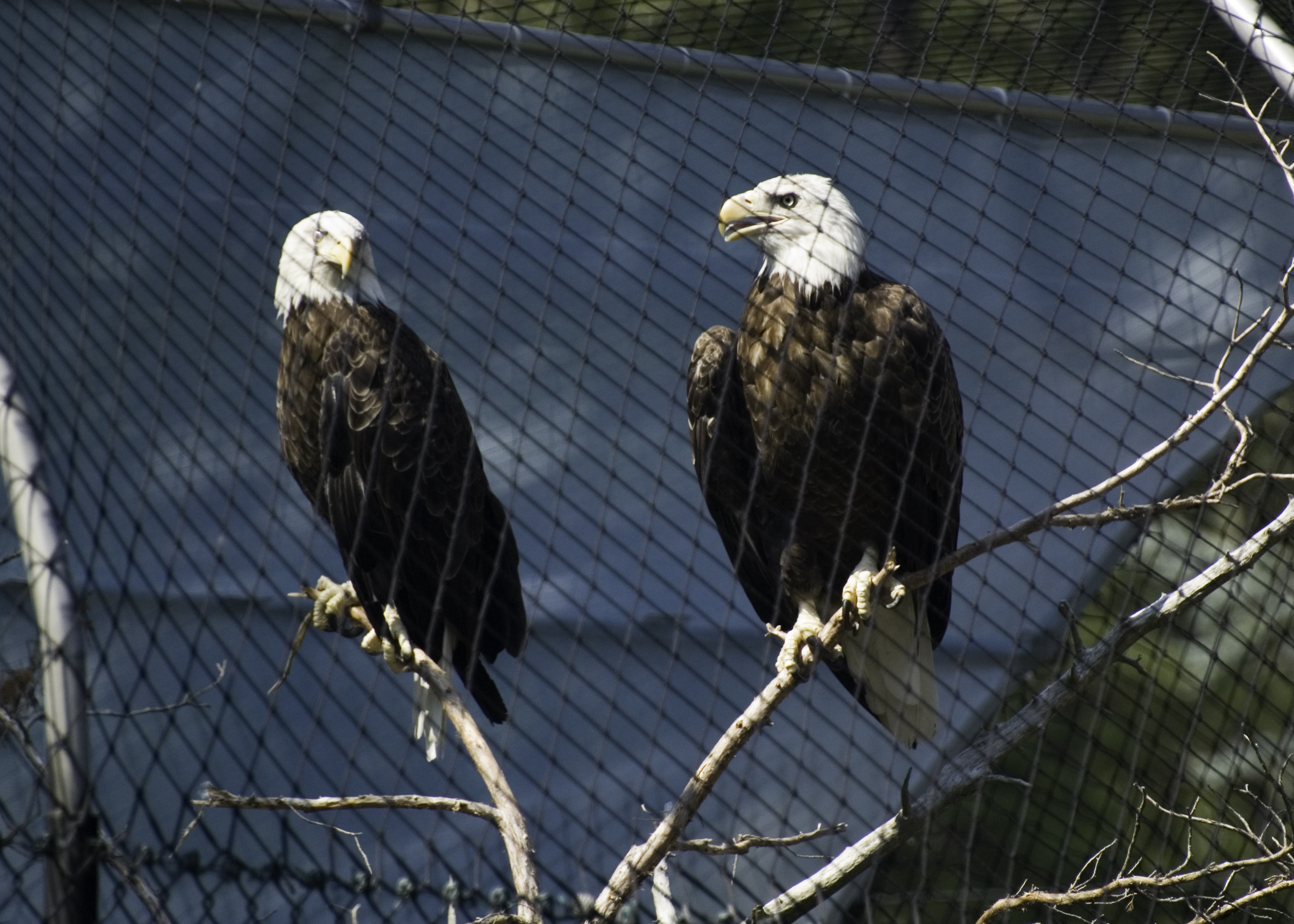
Bald eagles (Haliaeetus leucocephalus)

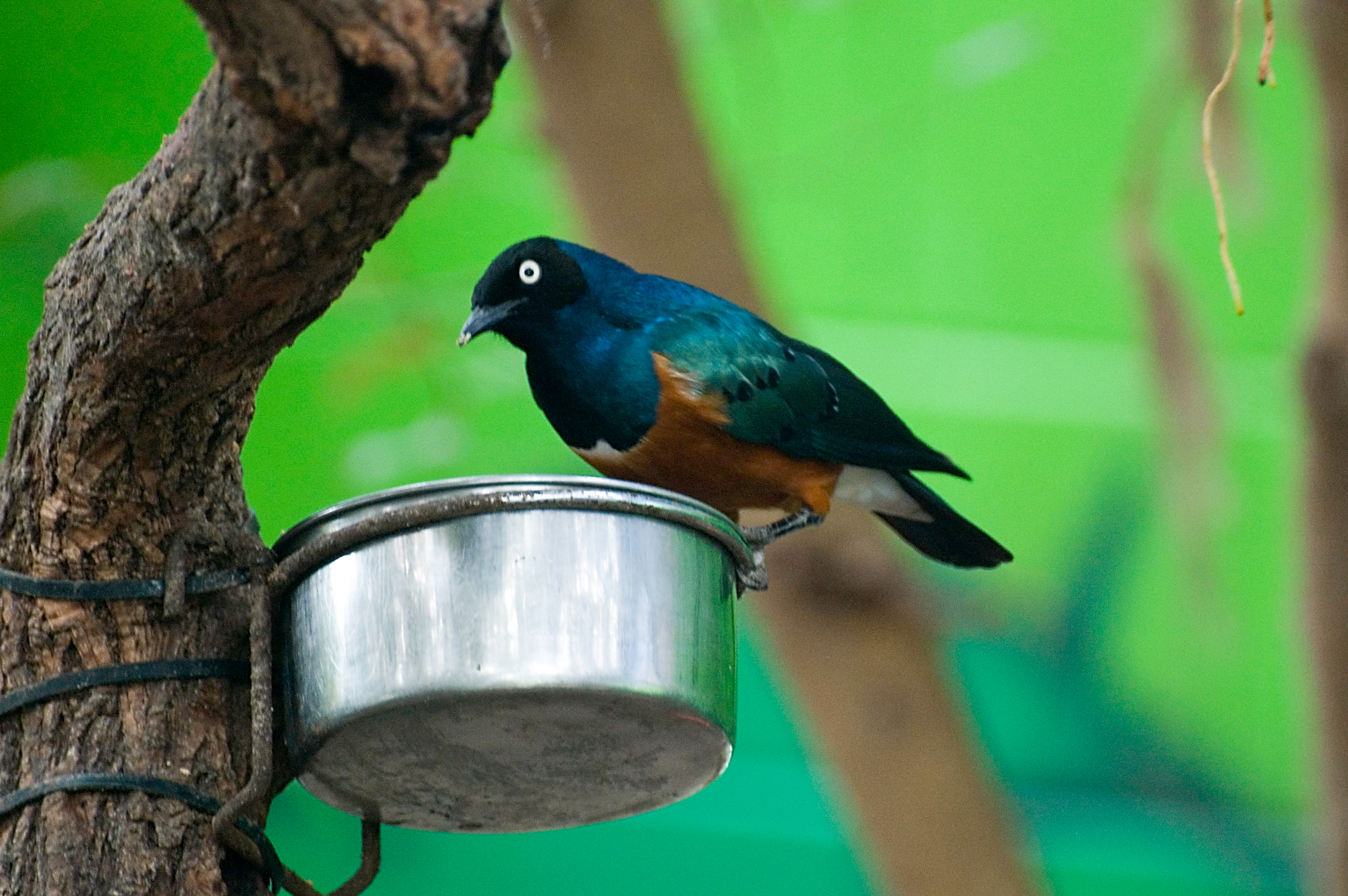
Superb starling (Lamprotornis superbus)

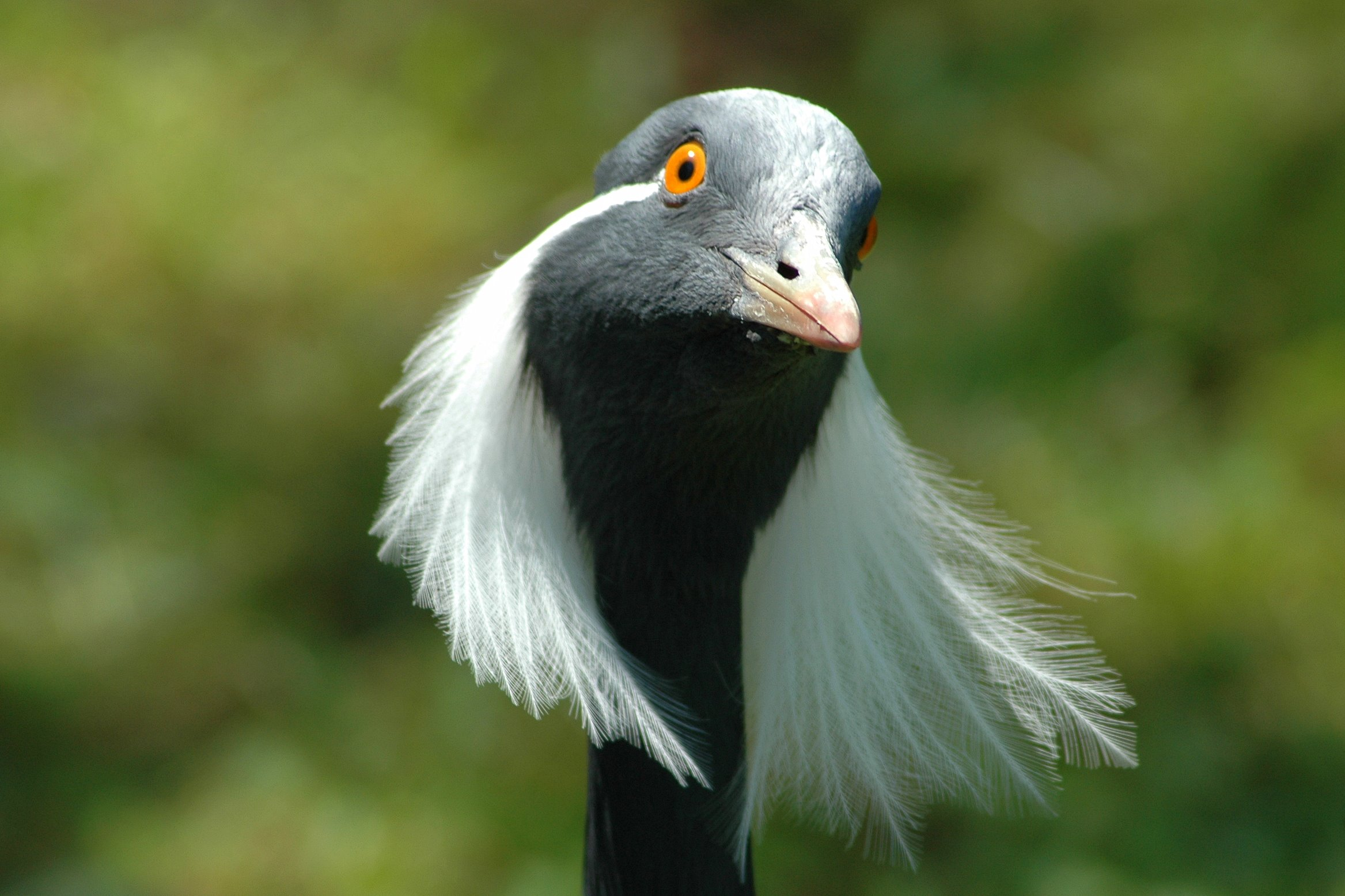
Demoiselle crane (Grus virgo)

A proclamation by Governor Jim McGreevey honoring the zoo’s 25th anniversary

A resolution by the New Jersey General Assembly honoring the zoo’s 25th anniversary

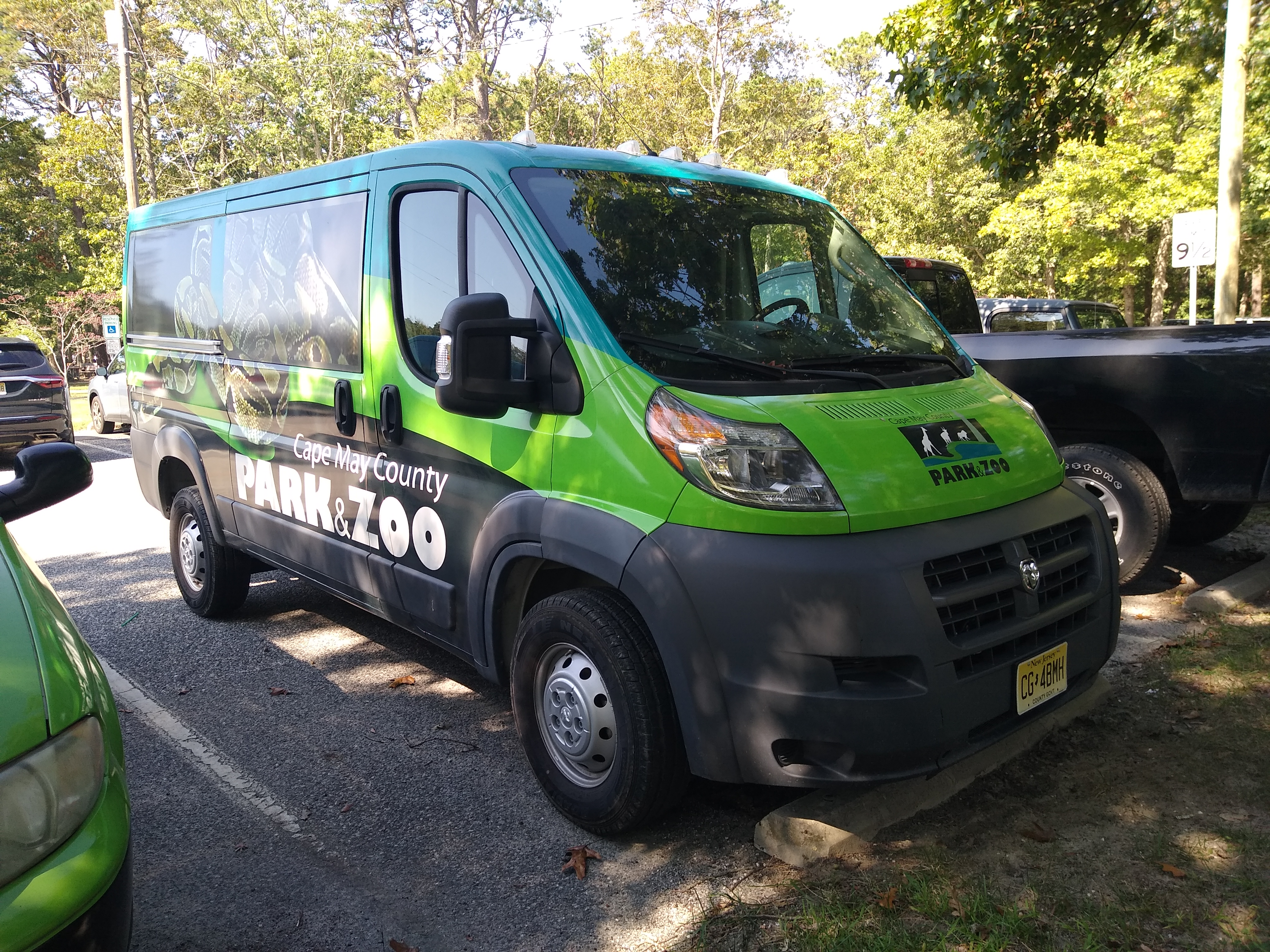
Zoo transport vehicle

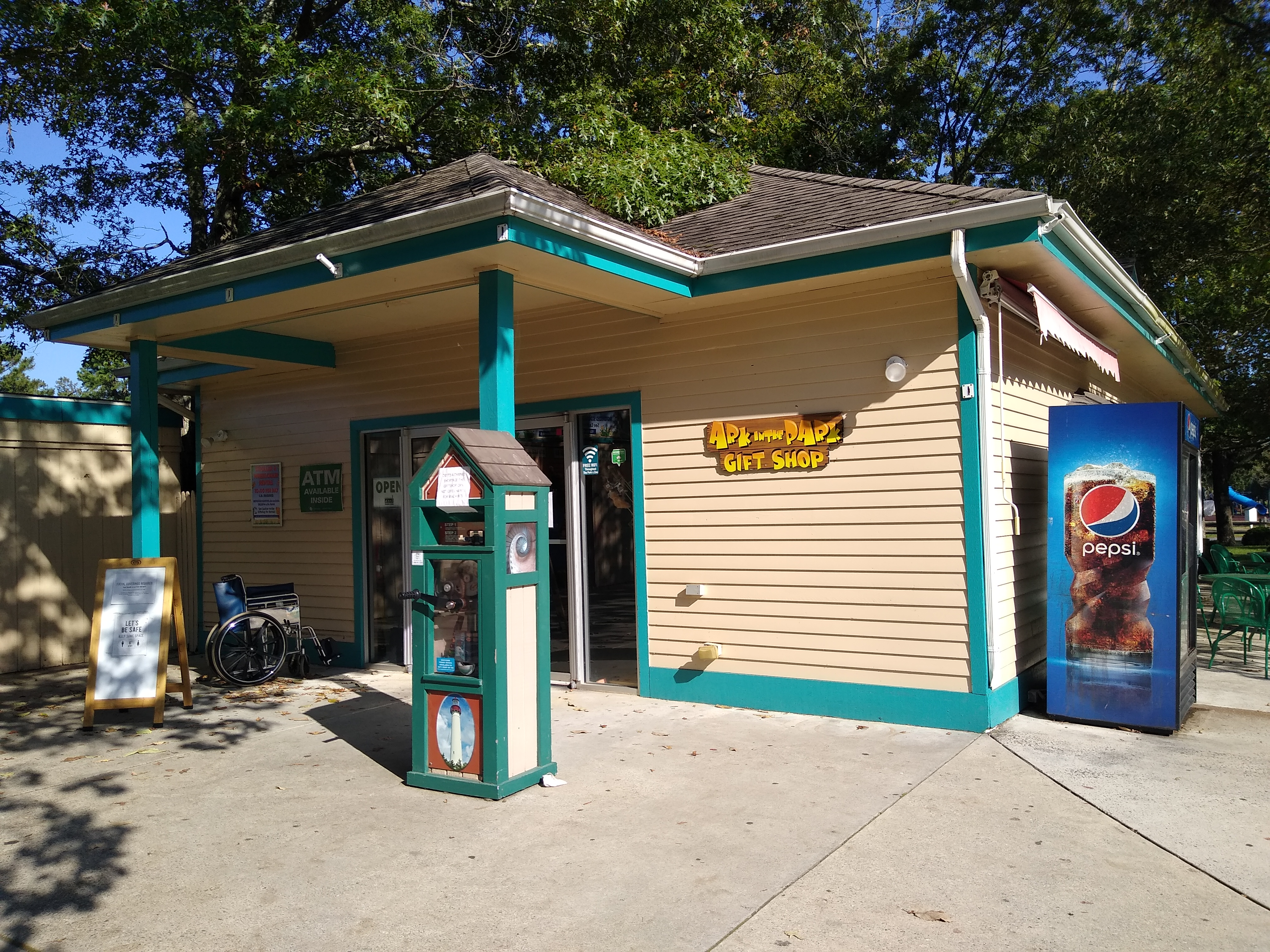
Zoo gift shop

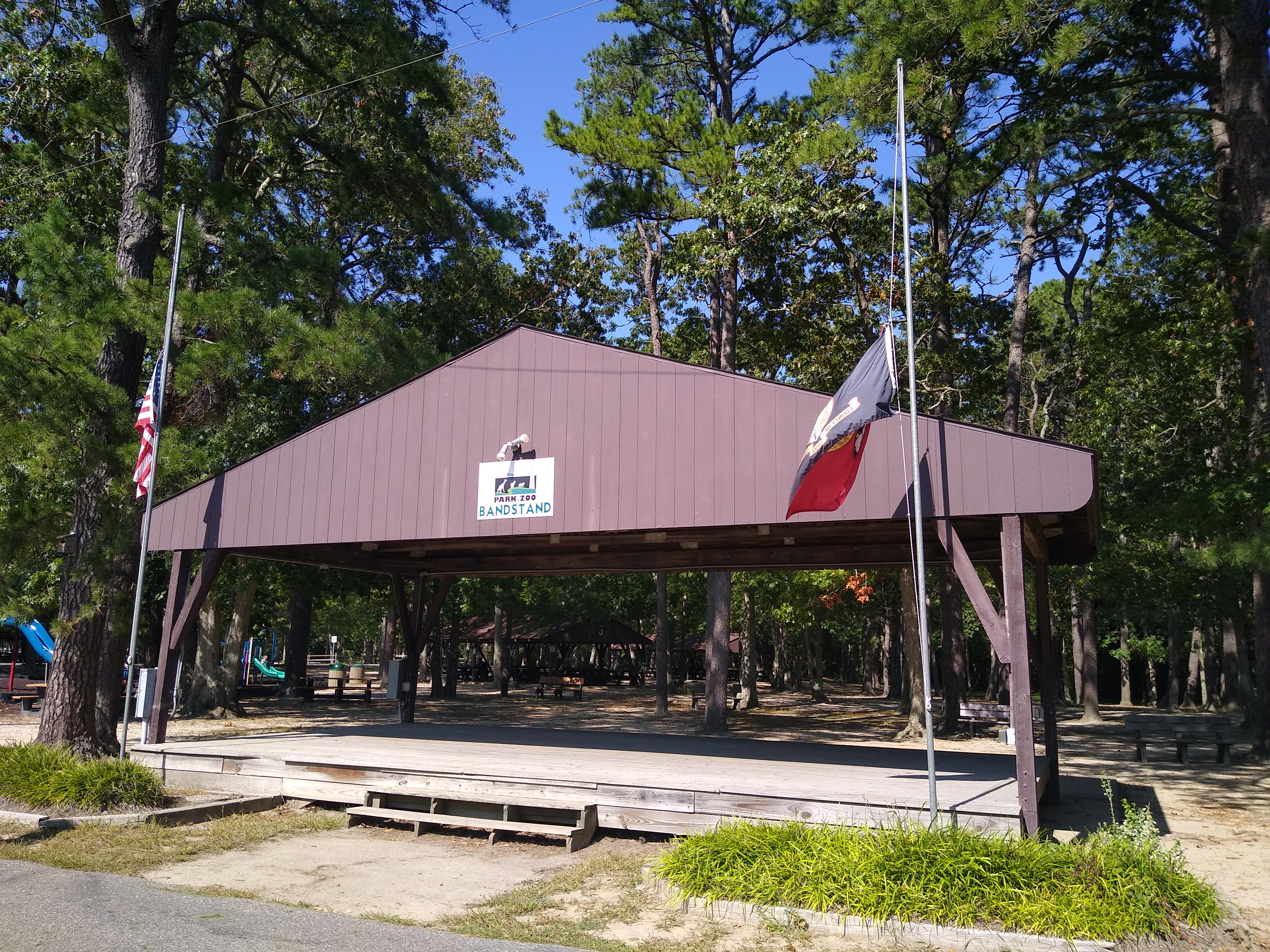
Pavilion in the park
