= Belleplain State Forest =

State forest in New Jersey

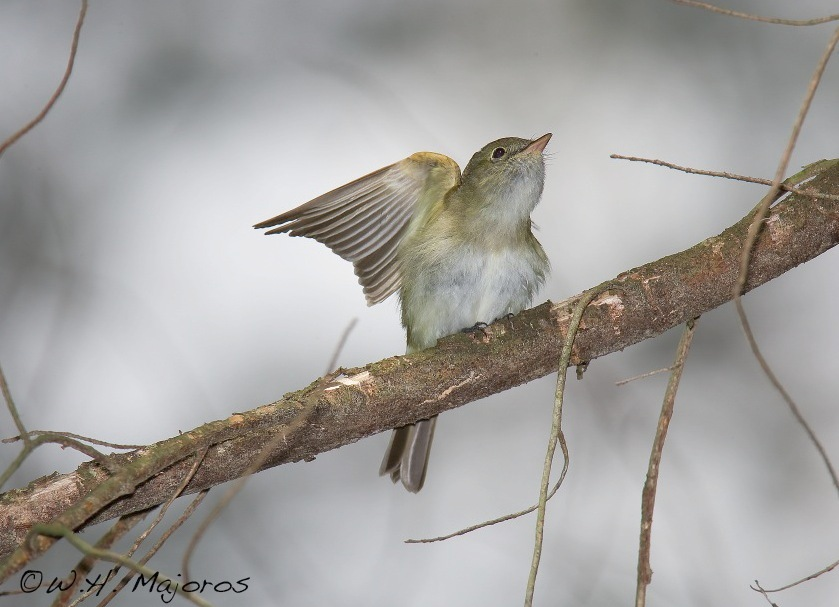

- Location within New Jersey Location within the United States
- Location: Cape May County
- Coordinates: 39°14′57″N 74°50′28″W
- Area: 21,320-acre (86.3 km^{2})
- Opened: 1928
- Operator: New Jersey Division of Parks and Forestry
- Website: Official website

Belleplain State Forest is a 21,320-acre (86.3 km^{2}) New Jersey State Forest in northern Cape May County and eastern Cumberland County. It has many young pine, oak and Atlantic white cedar trees, having better soil than the northern Pine Barrens. It was established in 1928 and the Civilian Conservation Corps (CCC) set up camps in 1933, and converted Meisle Cranberry Bog into Lake Nummy, and constructed the original forest headquarters, maintenance building, a road system, bridges, and dams.

The forest includes recreational facilities for picnicking, boating, camping, hunting and fishing, swimming, and over 40 miles (64 km) of walking trails. A fee is charged for camping and picnicking.

On June 7, 2002, the Green Acres Program added 230 acres (0.93 km^{2}) of privately owned land to Belleplain. Donated by the Brewer family, the property comprises approximately 200 acres (0.81 km^{2}) of woodlands - including Atlantic white cedar trees - surrounding 30-acre (0.12 km^{2}) Cedar Lake (also known as Hands Mill Pond) on West Creek in Maurice River Township, Cumberland County.

Former Lynyrd Skynyrd Guitarist Ed King resided on a Property within the Forest.

== Fauna ==
Belleplain is an important bird area, and a reliable hotspot for Prothonotary warblers and Worm-eating Warblers among other avian species.

If you are lucky, you catch a glimpse of an otter in Lake Nummy, or see or find signs of deer, beaver, foxes, coyotes, and even red squirrels.

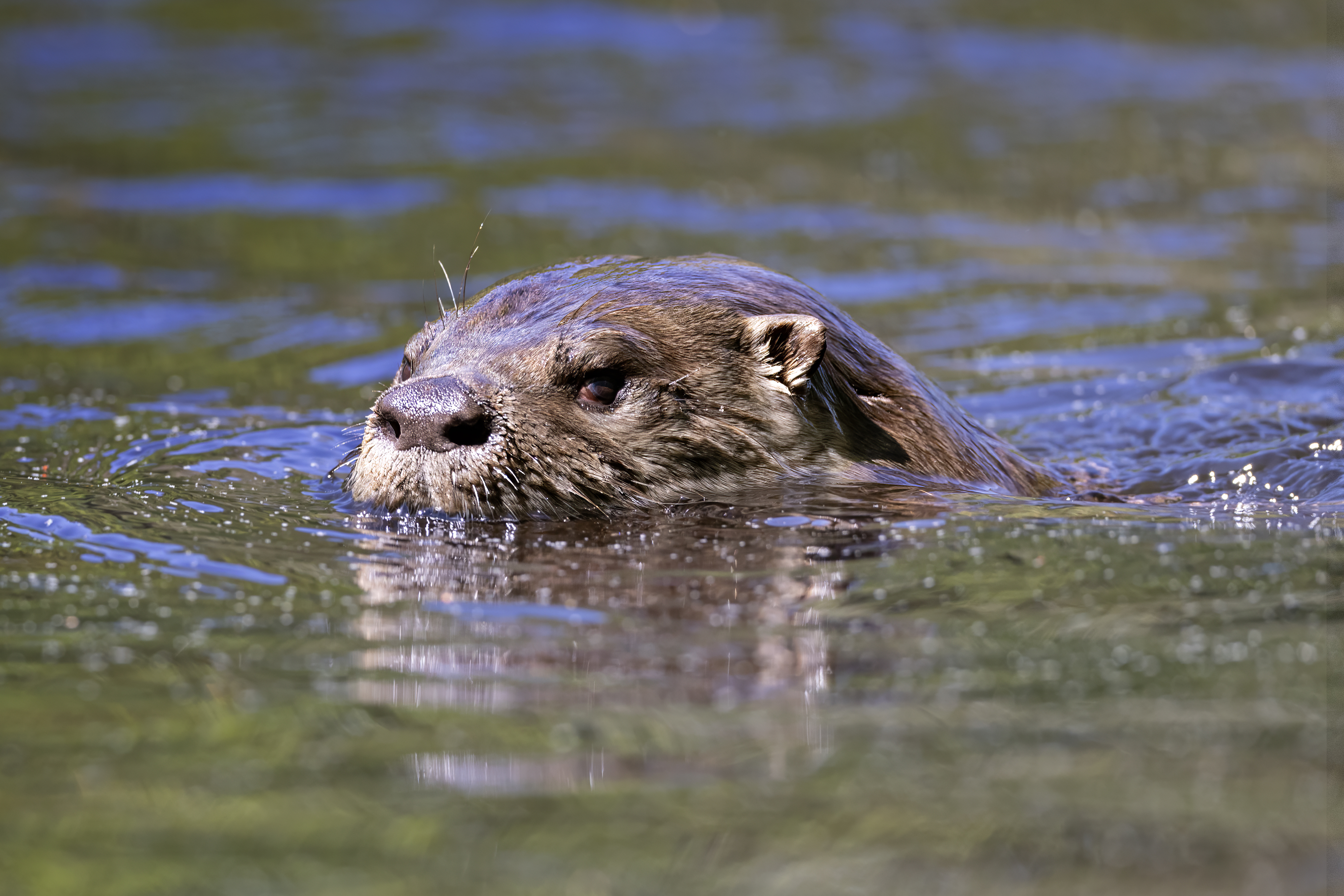
A North American River Otter in Lake Nummy.

== Trails ==
Visitors to the park can request a trail map at the headquarters building located at the entrance to the park from Route 550.

The park features paved roads and dirt and gravel roads suitable for cars, bikes, and horses. Other trails are only for hikers and walkers.

== See also ==
- List of New Jersey state parks
