= South Seaville Camp Meeting =

The South Seaville Camp Meeting is a Christian camp meeting located in Cape May County, New Jersey. It is located about 5 miles inland from Sea Isle City, NJ.

== History ==
The first mention of the South Seaville Camp Meeting is located in the records of the Cape May County newspaper from August 23, 1865:

"CAMP MEETING Today the great camp-meeting commences its session at Seaville. It will be an interesting occasion. Thousands from all parts of the country will flock there. Excursion tickets are issued by the rail- road company for every train"

Originally the gathering occurred at the Cape May County Agricultural Fairgrounds, and the meeting had a record attendance of about 10,000 persons and 1000 carriages.

The South Seaville Camp Meeting Association purchased land, which it currently still resides on, in July 1875. The land was subdivided into 500 'plots' unto which lease-holders would either pitch a canvas tent during the camp-meeting period, or build a wooden cottage in this location. Also, "camp privileges" were auctioned off to the highest bidder. These privileges included the ability to set up a boarding table and facilities for lodging in a large tent, hay and feed stand, sals of oysters, ice cream, confectionery, tobacco and cigars, drinks, fruits, meats and groceries, cake and pies, photos, etc.

In the center of these plots was the pavilion. This pavilion provided a platform and shelter for visiting preachers. Behind this platform the first building of the campground was built - the association office and also a boarding room for the visiting preachers or guests. (This building is now the "Hospitality House".)

The Boarding House was built by August 17, 1881. This building is 3 stories tall, with the first floor used as a dining room and the upper two floors as bunk rooms. A kitchen was also built onto the back of the structure as well as an annex on either side. The dining room, kitchen, and annexes are still used today. The upper two floors are not in use.
