= West Creek (New Jersey) =

River in New Jersey, United States

Coordinates: 39°14′26″N 74°54′12″W

West Creek is a 12.3-mile-long (19.8 km) tributary of Delaware Bay in Cape May County, New Jersey in the United States.

The name "West Creek" is derived from the Lenape word "westeconk," meaning "place of fat meat." It rises in the swamps to the west of Halberton, in Maurice River, and flows southward towards Belleplain State Forest. It was formerly dammed at Hoffman's Mill, but the pond is now drained. Southward, two dams still intact form Hands Millpond and Pickle Factory Pond. Below Pickle Factory Pond, it forms part of the boundary between Cape May and Cumberland Counties. It enters the tidal marshes, passing along the west side of the Stipson Island peninsula, near the south end of which is located an old landing, and empties into the bay.

== Tributaries ==
- Watering Branch

== See also ==
- List of rivers of New Jersey
