= Cape May County, New Jersey =

County in New Jersey, United States

- County
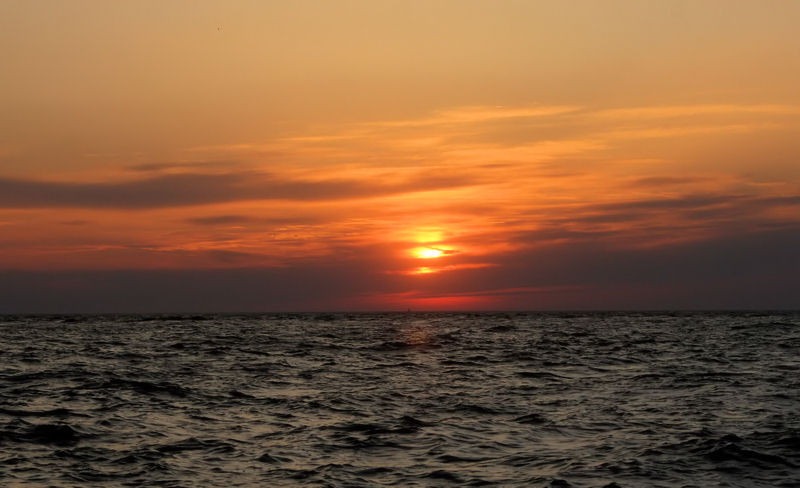
- Sunset on Sunset Beach in Lower Township in May 2009

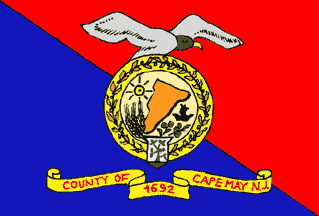
- Flag Seal Logo

- Location within the U.S. state of New Jersey
- Interactive map of Cape May County, New Jersey
- Coordinates: 39.08°N 74.86°W
- Country: United States
- State: New Jersey
- Founded: 1685
- Named for: Cornelius Jacobsen Mey
- Seat: Cape May Court House
- Largest municipality: Lower Township (population); Middle Township (area)

Government
  - Commissioner Director: Leonard C. Desiderio (R, term ends December 31, 2026)

Area
  - Total: 620.31 sq mi (1,606.6 km^{2})
  - Land: 251.52 sq mi (651.4 km^{2})
  - Water: 368.79 sq mi (955.2 km^{2}) 59.5%

Population (2020)
  - Total: 95,263 ▼
  - Estimate (2025): 93,390
  - Density: 378.75/sq mi (146.24/km^{2})
- Time zone: UTC−5 (Eastern)
  - Summer (DST): UTC−4 (EDT)
- Congressional district: 2nd
- Website: capemaycountynj.gov

Cape May County is the southernmost county in the U.S. state of New Jersey. Much of the county is located on the Cape May peninsula, bound by the Delaware Bay to its west and the Atlantic Ocean to its south and east. Adjacent to the Atlantic coastline are five barrier islands that have been built up as seaside resorts. A consistently popular summer destination with 30 miles (48 km) of beaches, Cape May County attracts vacationers from New Jersey and surrounding states, with the summer population exceeding 750,000. An estimated 11.6 million visitors in 2023 generated annual tourism spending of $7.7 billion, making it the county's single largest industry. The associated leisure and hospitality industries are Cape May's largest employers. Its county seat is the Cape May Court House section of Middle Township. The county is part of the Jersey Shore region of the state.

As of the 2020 United States census, the county was the state's second-least populous county, with a population of 95,263, a decrease of 2,002 (−2.1%) from the 2010 census count of 97,265, which in turn reflected a decline of 5,061 (-4.9%) from the 102,326 counted in the 2000 census. The United States Census Bureau's Population Estimates Program estimated a 2025 population of 93,390, an increase of -1,873 (-2.0%) from the 2020 decennial census, making it the only county whose population has declined in that period. The county is part of the Ocean City, NJ metropolitan statistical area and the Philadelphia metropolitan area.

Before Cape May County was settled by Europeans, the Kechemeche tribe of the Lenape Native Americans inhabited South Jersey. Beginning in 1609, European explorers purchased land from, and contributed to the decline of, the indigenous people. The county was named for Cornelius Jacobsen Mey, a Dutch captain who explored and charted the area from 1620 to 1621, and established a claim for the province of New Netherland. In 1685, the court of Cape May County was split from neighboring Burlington County, although the boundaries were not set until seven years later. In 1690, Cape May (originally known as Cape Island) was founded, becoming America's oldest seaside resort.

The county was subdivided into three townships in 1798: Lower, Middle, and Upper. The other 16 municipalities in the county, including two no longer in existence, were established between 1827 and 1928. In 1863, the first railroad in the county opened, which carried crops from the dominant farming industry. Railroads later led to the popularity of the county's coastal resorts. The need for improved automotive access to the county led to the development of the Garden State Parkway, which opened in 1956.

The most populous place was Lower Township with 22,057 residents in the 2020 census, and its geographically largest municipality is Middle Township, which covers 82.96 square miles (214.9 km^{2}).

== History ==
=== Etymology ===
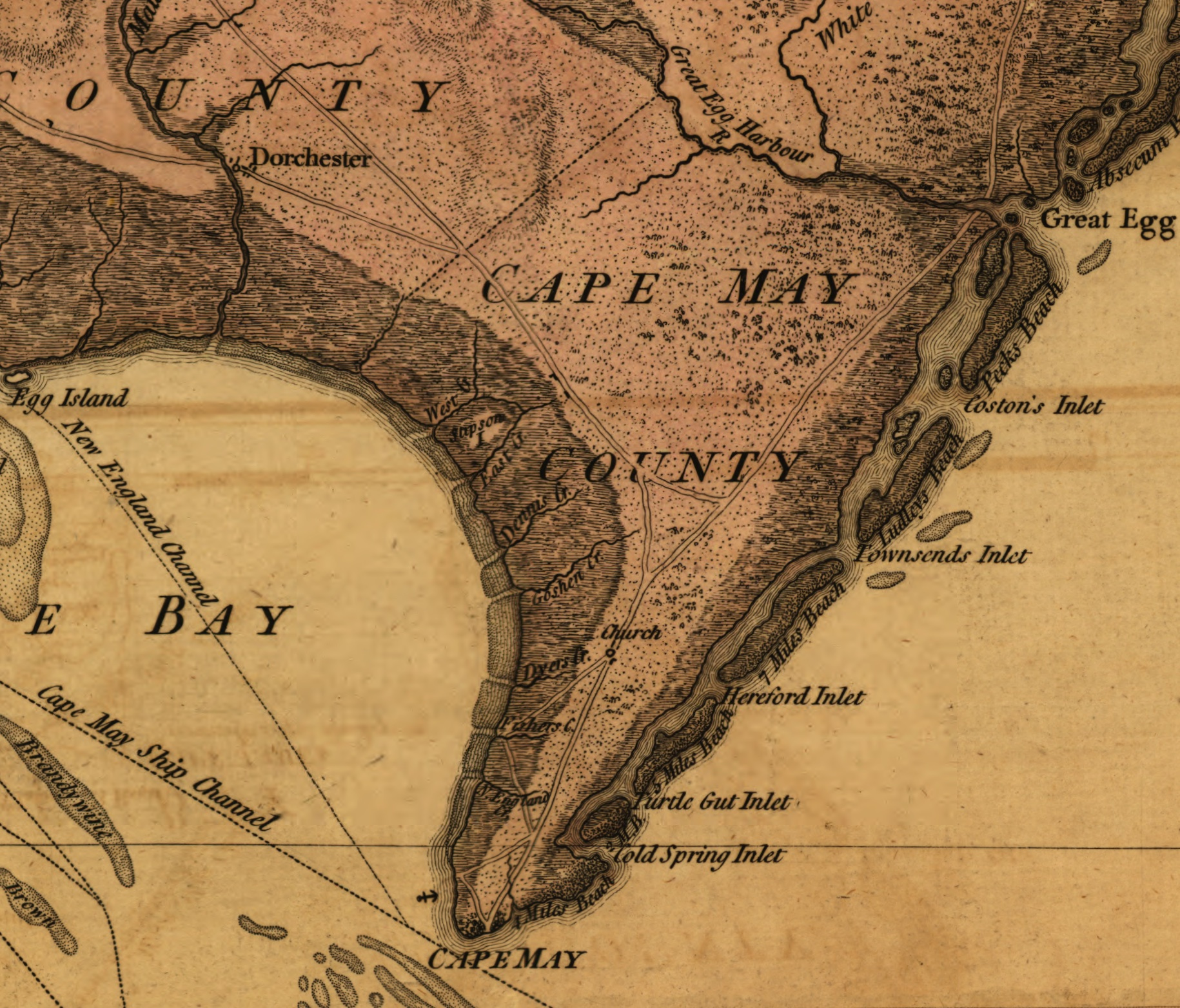
A 1777 map depicting Cape May County, the scene of the Battle of Turtle Gut Inlet on June 29, 1776, in the American Revolutionary War

Before Cape May County was settled by Europeans, the indigenous Kechemeche tribe of the Lenape people inhabited South Jersey, and traveled to the barrier islands during the summer to hunt and fish. During the 17th century, the area that is now Cape May County was claimed as part of New Netherlands, New Sweden, the Province of New Jersey under the British crown, and later West Jersey. On August 28, 1609, English explorer Henry Hudson entered the Delaware Bay and stayed one day on land, north of what is now Cape May Point. As early as 1666, the southern tip of New Jersey was known as Cape Maey, named after Dutch explorer Cornelius Jacobsen May, who sailed the coastline of New Jersey from 1620 to 1621. In 1630, representatives of the Dutch West India Company purchased a 16 mi^{2} (41 km^{2}) tract of land along the Delaware from indigenous people, and bought additional land 11 years later. Due to the large number of whales in the region of Cape May, Dutch explorers founded Town Bank around 1640 along the Delaware Bay as a whaling village. It was the first European settlement in what is now Cape May County, and was populated by descendants of Plymouth County.

=== History ===
In 1685, the court of Cape May was split from Burlington County, which at that time encompassed all or nearly all of South Jersey. In 1690, a settlement began at Cape Island (now Cape May). As whaling declined due to overpopulation, Town Bank diminished in importance in favor of Cape May, and was largely washed away by 1750. In 1692, Cape May County was designated as one of the original four counties of West Jersey, defined as the land from the most northerly portion of Great Egg Harbor Bay to a point 20 mi (32 km) east of the mouth of the Maurice River (called West Creek), south to the tip of Cape May. The limits of the county were adjusted over the next two centuries, mostly the portion near Maurice River Township. The first water mill in the county was constructed in 1699 in Cold Spring. Nearby, the First Baptist Church was built in 1712, and the first Cold Spring Presbyterian Church was built in 1718. Both churches, as well as nearby private homes, functioned as the center of early county government.

In 1744, the county chose Romney Marsh – later Cape May Court House – near the county's center to become the county seat. The first jail and courthouse were built in 1764. The county's population was around 1,000 in 1750, isolated from the rest of New Jersey by forests. Cape May grew independently as America's oldest bathing resort by 1765, leading to the city's current motto "The Nation's Oldest Seashore Resort". Amid the British blockade of the Delaware Bay in the American Revolutionary War, two British ships pursued and attacked the American brig Nancy, which fled to the coast at Turtle Gut Inlet (located in Wildwood Crest today). The Nancy was abandoned and sabotaged, killing at least 30 British sailors when the brig exploded after they boarded. The Battle of Turtle Gut Inlet on June 29, 1776, was the only Revolutionary War battle fought in the county.

Cape May County was split into three townships on February 21, 1798 – Lower, Middle, and Upper. The three townships were previously established as precincts on April 2, 1723. During the War of 1812, British forces raided farms in the county for food and fresh water. In retaliation, residents dug canals to the ocean, making the water no longer drinkable. In 1827, Dennis Township was created from portions of Upper Township, 101 years after its namesake Dennisville was founded in 1726. The oldest independent borough in the county was Cape Island Borough in 1848, which became the city of Cape May in 1869. Over the next 60 years as transport to the region improved, most of the current municipalities in the county were created. Sea Grove, later renamed Cape May Point, was founded in 1875. In 1879, Ocean City was founded as a religious retreat. Sea Isle City was founded in 1882, followed by West Cape May in 1884. In 1885, Anglesea (renamed North Wildwood in 1906) and Holly Beach (later a part of Wildwood) were founded. A land development company established Avalon in 1887. In 1891, Woodbine was founded on the mainland as an agriculture settlement for Russian Jews who fled religious persecution. From 1894 until 1945, South Cape May existed as an independent borough until it was largely destroyed by the 1944 Great Atlantic hurricane. In 1906, the eastern coastal boundary of Cape May County was established at a point 3 nautical miles (3.5 mi; 5.6 km) east of the coast. The last municipalities to be established were Wildwood Crest (in 1910), Stone Harbor (in 1914), and West Wildwood (in 1920). In 1928, North Cape May was founded, but was dissolved in 1945 after it failed to attract development following the Great Depression.

During World War II, Cape May Canal was built to connect the Delaware Bay and Cape May Harbor, completed in March 1943. The completion of the Garden State Parkway in 1955 brought hundreds of thousands of tourists, as well as a larger year-round population. Since the 1970s, the mainland has become more developed, due to the high cost of building on the barrier islands. Commercial development concentrated along U.S. Route 9 in Rio Grande, Cape May Court House, and Marmora. Concurrent with the 1980 Presidential election, Cape May County residents voted in favor to create a new state of South Jersey along with five other counties in a nonbinding referendum.

== Geography and climate ==
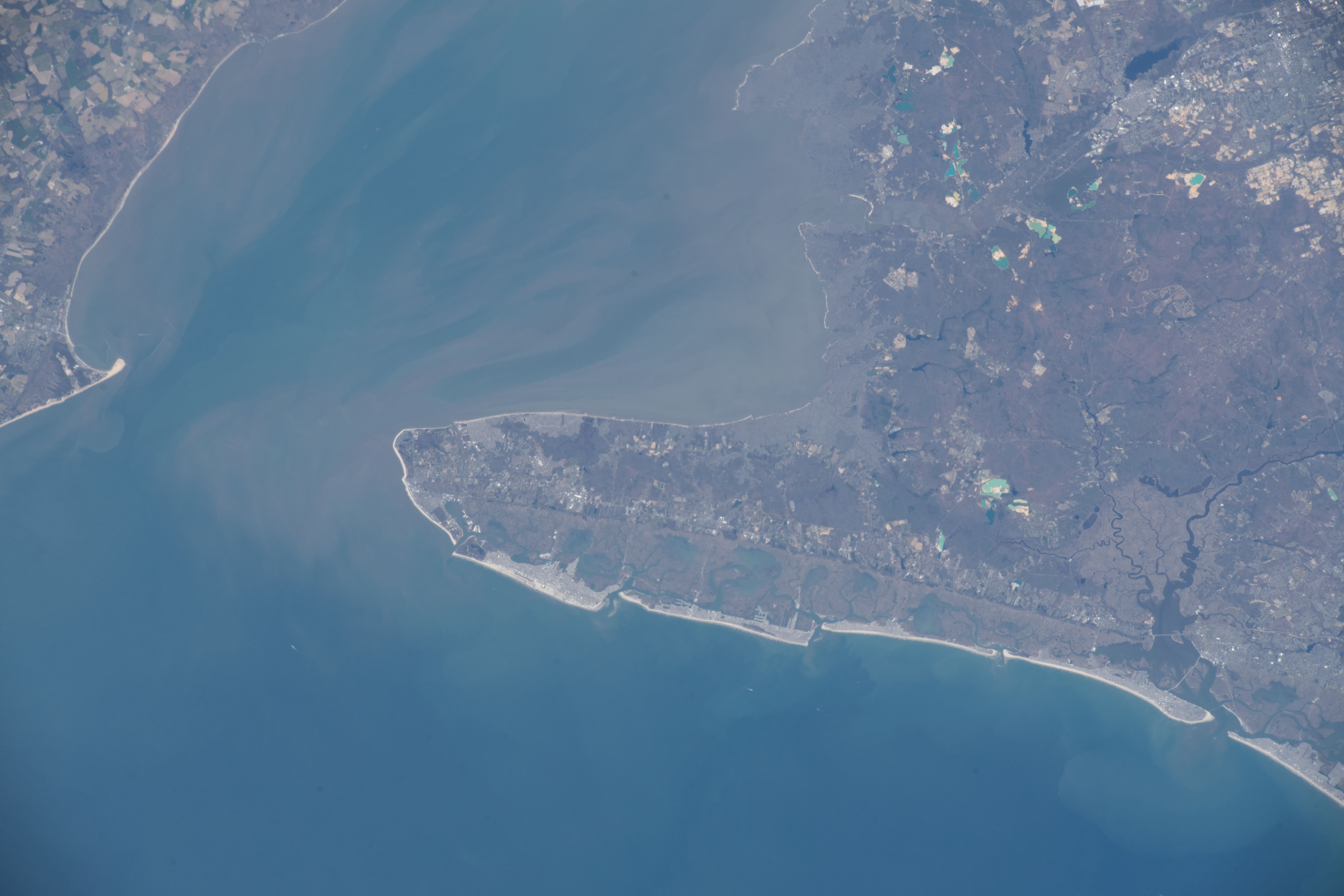
Satellite picture of Cape May County

Cape May County is 29 mi (47 km) long and 15 mi (24 km) at its widest. According to the U.S. Census Bureau, as of the 2020 Census, the county had a total area of 620.31 square miles (1,606.6 km^{2}), of which 251.52 square miles (651.4 km^{2}) was land (40.5%) and 368.79 square miles (955.2 km^{2}) was water (59.5%). The county is located about 150 mi (240 km) south of New York City, 80 mi (130 km) southeast of Philadelphia, and 150 mi (240 km) east of Washington, D.C. To the south and east of the county is the Atlantic Ocean. The location near water provides milder temperatures than surrounding areas, as well as a continuous breeze, which contribute to the area's tourism-driven economy. Sea level along the coast is the lowest point. The highest elevation is found at three areas in Belleplain State Forest in the county's northern corner, which are approximately 60 ft (18 m) above sea level.

Overall, the county is flat and coastal. Much of Cape May County lies on the Cape May Peninsula, which is part of the Atlantic coastal plain. The peninsula is bounded to the west by the Delaware Bay, and to the east is 1.5 to 3 mi (2.4 to 4.8 km) of marshes and water channels making up the Intracoastal Waterway. There are over 1,574 mi (2,533 km) of streams and rivers in the county, with the Great Egg Harbor River and its tributaries covering the northern portion of the county. There are also 24,150 acres (9,770 ha) of ponds, lakes, bays, and reservoirs. There are five barrier islands, measuring 32 mi (51 km) in total, that are adjacent to the mainland. The islands have gently sloped beaches and are largely built up. There were only four barrier islands from 1922, when Turtle Gut Inlet was filled in to create Wildwood Crest, until 1945, when Cape May Canal was constructed through the southern portion of the county.

=== Climate ===
Cape May Court House, New Jersey

Climate chart (precipitation, max. and min. temperature)
J	F	M	A	M	J	J	A	S	O	N	D
3.3 42 28	2.9 44 29	4.3 51 35	3.5 61 44	3.5 70 53	3.4 79 63	3.7 85 68	3.6 83 67	3.3 78 61	3.7 67 50	3.3 57 41	3.5 47 32
- █ Average max. and min. temperatures in °F
- █ Precipitation totals in inches
- Source: The Weather Channel
Metric conversion
J	F	M	A	M	J	J	A	S	O	N	D
84 6 −2	74 7 −2	108 11 2	90 16 7	90 21 12	86 26 17	94 29 20	92 28 19	83 26 16	94 19 10	84 14 5	88 8 0
- █ Average max. and min. temperatures in °C
- █ Precipitation totals in mm

Given its maritime influence and southernmost location within New Jersey, Cape May County has a more moderate climate than surrounding areas. During the summer, the county is often 3–5 degrees cooler, and 5–10 degrees warmer in the winter. Much of the county is in USDA plant hardiness zone 7a/7b, with a small portion in the county's southeastern extreme in zone 8a. This equates to an average annual minimum temperature of 0 to 10 °F (−18 to −12 °C). The average temperatures in the county seat of Cape May Court House range from a low of 22 °F (−6 °C) in January to a high of 85 °F (29 °C) in July, although a record low of −22 °F (−30 °C) was recorded in January 1942 and a record high of 103 °F (39 °C) was recorded in July 1993. Average monthly precipitation ranged from 2.91 inches (74 mm) in June to 4.68 inches (119 mm) in August, and annual precipitation is around 40 in (1,000 mm). The region typically gets 10 to 15 in (250 to 380 mm) of snowfall each year, much less than the mountains of New Jersey. According to the Köppen climate classification system, Cape May County has a humid subtropical climate (Cfa). According to the Trewartha climate classification this climate is Do (oceanic.) The county has windy conditions throughout the year.

Owing to its location along the coast, Cape May County has experienced the effects of tropical cyclones for centuries. In Whale Beach on Ludlam Island, core samples suggested the passage of an intense hurricane sometime between 1278 and 1438. The next significant hurricane in the area was September 3, 1821. Around 1800 UTC (2:00 pm local time), the eye of the hurricane crossed over Cape May, estimated as a Category 4 on the Saffir–Simpson scale. It is estimated that an identical hurricane to the 1821 storm in the 21st century would cause over $1 billion in damage in Cape May County, and $107 billion in damage nationwide. The Gale of 1878 flooded Cape May County and produced 84 mph (135 km/h) winds. During the passage of Hurricane Gloria in 1985, Ocean City recorded a wind gust of 101 mph (163 km/h). Hurricane Sandy struck the state on October 31, 2012, causing at least $150 million in damage in the county from its high winds and high tides. At the terminal for the Cape May–Lewes Ferry in North Cape May, Sandy produced the highest tide on record at 8.9 ft (2.7 m), surpassing the previous record of 8.8 ft (2.7 m) set by Hurricane Gloria.

Cape May County has experienced a variety of other weather effects. In March 1962, a stalled coastal storm produced several days of extremely high tides along the barrier islands, which damaged the boardwalks of Cape May, Avalon, and Sea Isle City. The 1991 Perfect Storm produced high tides and beach erosion. In January 2016, a blizzard nicknamed "Winter Storm Jonas" produced record high tides in the county, reaching 9.0 ft (2.7 m) at the terminal for Cape May–Lewes Ferry, surpassing that of Hurricane Sandy. Nearly every municipality in the county reported damage, and in coastal towns, the beaches were severely eroded. Since 1950, ten tornadoes have touched down in the county.

=== Flora and fauna ===
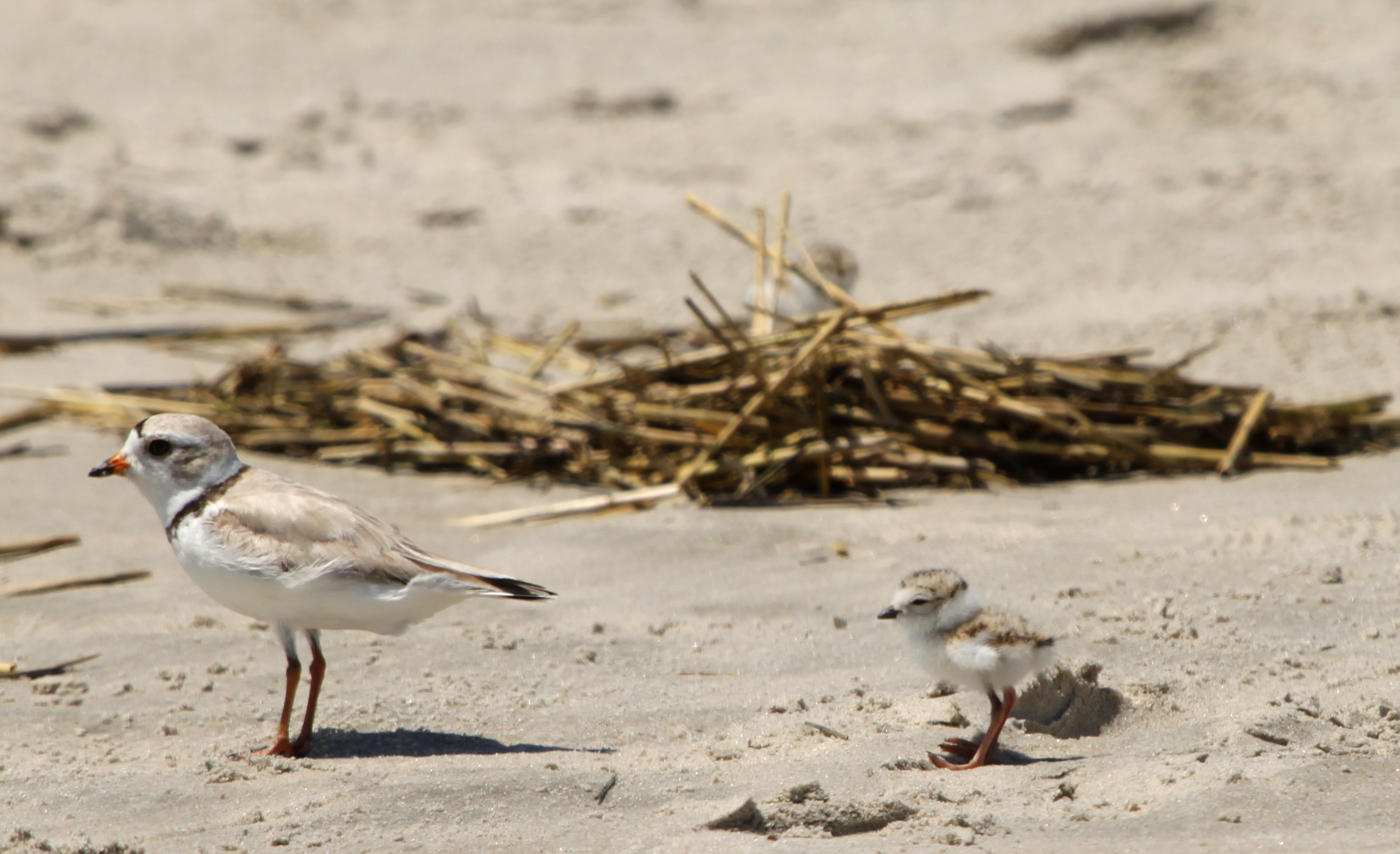
Piping plovers in Cape May

The uplands, wetlands, and open waters of the county support one of the largest concentrations of migratory birds in North America. Nearly 900,000 migratory birds were observed in 1995 in Avalon. Along the Delaware Bay, 800,000 to 1.5 million birds pass through the area each spring. In 1947, the Stone Harbor Bird Sanctuary was established, which was designated as a National Natural Landmark in 1965. In addition to the 151 species of birds that frequent the county, there are two species of whales, the loggerhead sea turtle, the northern pine snake, two species of treefrog, and the tiger salamander that inhabit the waters of Cape May County. Eight species of fish and four species of shellfish populate the coastal waters.

About 30% of the county is covered by forests that runs the length of the Cape May peninsula and connects with the Pinelands. The largely unfragmented forest provides breeding grounds for the barred owl, red-shouldered hawk, and wood thrush, and also provides habitat for insects and migratory birds. In the county's swampy interior, there are over 20 species of trees and 40 species of shrubs. About 42% of the county consists of wetlands. The marshes between the mainland and the barrier island are dominated by the common reed, narrow-leaved cattail, bulrushes, and smooth cordgrass. Along the beach, the American beachgrass predominantly make up dune systems, along with other plant species.

The county utilizes five underground aquifers, including two that derive from the Kirkwood-Cohansey aquifer. Severe storms resulted in saltwater intrusion of the county's freshwater supply. The suitable growing conditions led to West Cape May considering itself the "lima bean capital of the world", until Guatemala surpassed it in the 1990s. The city still hosts an annual lima bean festival.

=== Geology ===
The oldest rocks in the county are at a depth of 5,000 ft (1,500 m), formed during the Precambrian era. These metamorphic rocks include gneiss, quartzite, and schist. During the Paleozoic era, the region was part of a mountainous landmass that extended from the Arctic to Mexico. Erosion during the Triassic and Jurassic periods formed valleys that gathered sediment, which deposited and layered as the coastline receded and rose. In the Paleocene and Eocene epochs, as well as the later Miocene epoch, the area that is now Cape May County was under water. The coastline receded again during the Quaternary period.

During the Sangamonian interglacial period, melting glaciers formed rivers that carried sediment to the coast. The Bridgeton Formation deposited silt and clay through a fluvial process, while the later Cape May Formation deposited sand, silt, clay, and gravel. The Great Egg Harbor River in its formative stage produced a delta that covered much of what is now Cape May County with sediment. During the most recent ice age (Wisconsin glaciation), the sea level dropped to 430 ft (130 m) below its current depth. Around 14,000 years ago, glaciers began melting, and the barrier islands of Cape May County formed, likely from spits and lines of dunes.

== Demographics ==
Historical population
Census	Pop.	Note	%±
1790	2,571		—
1800	3,066		19.3%
1810	3,632		18.5%
1820	4,265		17.4%
1830	4,936		15.7%
1840	5,324		7.9%
1850	6,433		20.8%
1860	7,130		10.8%
1870	8,349		17.1%
1880	9,765		17.0%
1890	11,268		15.4%
1900	13,201		17.2%
1910	19,745		49.6%
1920	19,460		−1.4%
1930	29,486		51.5%
1940	28,919		−1.9%
1950	37,131		28.4%
1960	48,555		30.8%
1970	59,554		22.7%
1980	82,266		38.1%
1990	95,089		15.6%
2000	102,326		7.6%
2010	97,265		−4.9%
2020	95,263		−2.1%
2025 (est.)	93,390		−2.0%
Historical sources: 1790-1990; 1970-2010 2000 2010 2020

Cape May County is part of the Ocean City, NJ Metropolitan Statistical Area, as well as the Philadelphia metropolitan area.

=== 2020 census ===
As of the 2020 census, the county had a population of 95,263 and contained 41,012 households and 26,792 families. The population density was 378.9 inhabitants per square mile (146.3/km^{2}). There were 99,606 housing units at an average density of 396.2 per square mile (153.0/km^{2}), and 58.8% of housing units were vacant.

The racial makeup of the county was 85.6% White, 3.7% Black or African American, 0.3% American Indian and Alaska Native, 1.0% Asian, <0.1% Native Hawaiian and Pacific Islander, 3.5% from some other race, and 6.0% from two or more races. Hispanic or Latino residents of any race comprised 7.8% of the population. The most reported ancestries were:

- Irish (30.5%)
- German (20.7%)
- Italian (17.7%)
- English (15.4%)
- Polish (5.5%)
- Puerto Rican (3.5%)
- Scottish (3.1%)
- African American (2.9%)
- Mexican (2.5%)
- French (2.2%)

There were 41,012 households in the county, of which 21.8% had children under the age of 18 living in them. Of all households, 47.5% were married-couple households, 17.9% were households with a male householder and no spouse or partner present, and 28.4% were households with a female householder and no spouse or partner present. About 31.7% of all households were made up of individuals and 17.7% had someone living alone who was 65 years of age or older. Among occupied housing units, 75.8% were owner-occupied and 24.2% were renter-occupied; the homeowner vacancy rate was 2.0% and the rental vacancy rate was 23.1%. The average household size was 2.19 and the average family size was 2.70.

As of the 2020 census, 17.1% of residents were under the age of 18 and 27.9% were 65 years of age or older. The median age was 51.5 years. For every 100 females there were 93.2 males, and for every 100 females age 18 and over there were 91.7 males age 18 and over. Overall, 81.4% of residents lived in urban areas and 18.6% lived in rural areas.

The county's median household income was $69,980, and the median family income was $83,695. About 8.8% of the population were below the poverty line, including 14.2% of those under age 18 and 6.2% of those age 65 or over.

=== Racial and ethnic composition ===
Cape May County, New Jersey – Racial and ethnic composition Note: the US Census treats Hispanic/Latino as an ethnic category. This table excludes Latinos from the racial categories and assigns them to a separate category. Hispanics/Latinos may be of any race.
Race / Ethnicity (NH = Non-Hispanic)	Pop 1980	Pop 1990	Pop 2000	Pop 2010	Pop 2020	% 1980	% 1990	% 2000	% 2010	% 2020
White alone (NH)	75,538	87,192	92,137	84,522	80,040	91.82%	91.70%	90.04%	86.90%	84.02%
Black or African American alone (NH)	5,048	5,223	4,978	4,244	3,305	6.14%	5.49%	4.86%	4.36%	3.47%
Native American or Alaska Native alone (NH)	100	194	158	143	99	0.12%	0.20%	0.15%	0.15%	0.10%
Asian alone (NH)	289	567	655	818	893	0.35%	0.60%	0.64%	0.84%	0.94%
Native Hawaiian or Pacific Islander alone (NH)	x	x	33	32	22	x	x	0.03%	0.03%	0.02%
Other race alone (NH)	101	58	50	85	319	0.12%	0.06%	0.05%	0.09%	0.33%
Mixed race or Multiracial (NH)	x	x	937	1,367	3,120	x	x	0.92%	1.41%	3.28%
Hispanic or Latino (any race)	1,190	1,855	3,378	6,054	7,465	1.45%	1.95%	3.30%	6.22%	7.84%
Total	82,266	95,089	102,326	97,265	95,263	100.00%	100.00%	100.00%	100.00%	100.00%

=== 2010 census ===
The 2010 United States census counted 97,265 people, 40,812 households, and 25,956 families in the county. The population density was 386.9 inhabitants per square mile (149.4/km^{2}). There were 98,309 housing units at an average density of 391 per square mile (151/km^{2}). The racial makeup was 89.83% (87,369) White, 4.69% (4,565) Black or African American, 0.21% (205) Native American, 0.86% (834) Asian, 0.04% (36) Pacific Islander, 2.47% (2,399) from other races, and 1.91% (1,857) from two or more races. Hispanic or Latino of any race were 6.22% (6,054) of the population.

Of the 40,812 households, 21.6% had children under the age of 18; 48.3% were married couples living together; 11% had a female householder with no husband present and 36.4% were non-families. Of all households, 31.2% were made up of individuals and 15.5% had someone living alone who was 65 years of age or older. The average household size was 2.32 and the average family size was 2.89.

18.9% of the population were under the age of 18, 8% from 18 to 24, 20.1% from 25 to 44, 31.6% from 45 to 64, and 21.6% who were 65 years of age or older. The median age was 47.1 years. For every 100 females, the population had 94.6 males. For every 100 females ages 18 and older there were 92.4 males.

As of the 2010 census, there were 98,365 houses in the county, of which only 42% were occupied year round. There are 47 campgrounds with 17,999 campsites, greater than the number of campsites in all other counties in the state combined. There are also 18,700 hotel rooms in the county. The median household income of the county was $57,168 as of 2013, the fourth-lowest of New Jersey's 21 counties. About 10% of residents live below the federal poverty line. The county ranked last in the state in terms of residents with Assets Limited, Income Constrained, and Employed (ALICE), representing nearly one-third of the county's residents.

== Government ==
=== County government ===
Cape May County is governed by a five-person Board of County Commissioners whose members are elected at-large on a partisan basis to three-year terms of office on a staggered basis, with either one or two seats coming up for election each year; At an annual reorganization held each January, the commissioners select one member to serve as director and another to serve as vice-director for a term of one year. As of 2026, Cape May County's Commissioners are Director Leonard C. Desiderio (R, Sea Isle City, term as commissioner ends December 31, 2027; term as director ends 2026), Vice-Director Andrew Bulakowski (R, Lower Township; term as commissioner ends 2028; term as vice-director ends 2026). Robert Barr (R, Ocean City; 2028) Will Morey (R, Wildwood Crest; 2026) and Patrick Rosenello (R, North Wildwood, appointed to a term expiring in December 2026).

Each county in New Jersey is required by the New Jersey State Constitution to have three elected administrative officials known as "constitutional officers." These officers are the County Clerk and County Surrogate (both elected for five-year terms of office) and the County Sheriff (elected for a three-year term). The county's constitutional officers are Clerk Rita Marie Rothberg (R, Ocean City; 2030), Sheriff Robert Nolan (R, Lower Township; 2026) and Surrogate E. Marie Hayes (R, Ocean City; 2028).

Melanie Collette resigned from office in March 2026 from a seat expiring in December 2026. Patrick Rosenello, City Council President of North Wildwood, was sworn in to take her seat the following month.

No Democrat has won countywide office since Jeff Van Drew did so in 2000; Van Drew later switched parties and has won office as a Republican.

The Cape May County Prosecutor is Jeffrey H. Sutherland, who was appointed to the position by Governor of New Jersey Chris Christie and sworn into office on December 21, 2017. Cape May County, along with Atlantic County, is part of a joint vicinage of the New Jersey Superior Court. Cape County has a civil courthouse in Cape May Court House; the Assignment Judge for the vicinage is M. Susan Sheppard.

=== Law Enforcement ===
The current county sheriff is Bob Nolan, elected in 2017 after working in the sheriff's office for 30 years, most recently as undersheriff. The first county sheriff was Benjamin Godfrey in 1692. Aside from maintaining law and order, the sheriff's responsibilities include the sale of property, overseeing the corrections facility, transporting of jurors, and collecting court-ordered judgments. The first county jail was built in 1705 in Middle Township, and the current jail was built in 1977. A new facility is scheduled to be completed in August 2018, at the cost of $37 million. In 2015, Cape May County had 3,332 criminal offenses, the fifth fewest of any county in New Jersey. This represented a crime rate of 35.1 offenses per 1,000 people, and a violent crime rate of 4.7 offenses per 1,000 people.

=== Federal representatives ===
The 2nd Congressional District covers all of Cape May County. For the 119th United States Congress, New Jersey's 2nd congressional district is represented by Jeff Van Drew (R, Dennis Township).

=== State representatives ===
The county lies entirely within the 1st Legislative District.

District	Senate	Assembly	Notes
1st	Mike Testa (R)	Antwan McClellan (R) Erik K. Simonsen (R)	The remainder of this district covers portions of Atlantic County and Cumberland County.

== Politics ==
United States presidential election results for Cape May County, New Jersey
Year	Republican		Democratic		Third party(ies)	
Year	No.	%	No.	%	No.	%
1896	2,136	65.48%	929	28.48%	197	6.04%
1900	2,253	62.46%	1,109	30.75%	245	6.79%
1904	2,832	66.56%	1,238	29.10%	185	4.35%
1908	2,937	63.27%	1,553	33.46%	152	3.27%
1912	909	18.08%	2,124	42.24%	1,996	39.69%
1916	2,904	56.85%	2,097	41.05%	107	2.09%
1920	5,785	70.76%	2,198	26.89%	192	2.35%
1924	8,139	72.37%	2,611	23.22%	496	4.41%
1928	12,207	76.40%	3,731	23.35%	40	0.25%
1932	10,112	57.84%	7,160	40.96%	210	1.20%
1936	8,531	47.52%	9,363	52.16%	58	0.32%
1940	9,429	52.55%	8,485	47.29%	30	0.17%
1944	8,252	54.60%	6,835	45.22%	27	0.18%
1948	11,227	64.46%	6,031	34.63%	159	0.91%
1952	15,218	68.52%	6,984	31.45%	7	0.03%
1956	16,887	74.02%	5,897	25.85%	31	0.14%
1960	16,076	61.31%	10,137	38.66%	9	0.03%
1964	11,390	43.18%	14,943	56.65%	47	0.18%
1968	14,970	53.14%	9,664	34.30%	3,538	12.56%
1972	22,621	70.54%	8,729	27.22%	719	2.24%
1976	19,498	53.18%	16,489	44.97%	680	1.85%
1980	22,729	59.08%	12,708	33.03%	3,034	7.89%
1984	28,786	68.06%	13,378	31.63%	133	0.31%
1988	28,738	65.14%	15,105	34.24%	274	0.62%
1992	21,502	44.01%	17,324	35.46%	10,030	20.53%
1996	19,357	42.98%	19,849	44.07%	5,830	12.95%
2000	23,794	49.99%	22,189	46.62%	1,611	3.38%
2004	28,832	56.80%	21,475	42.31%	455	0.90%
2008	27,288	53.52%	22,893	44.90%	802	1.57%
2012	25,781	53.61%	21,657	45.03%	655	1.36%
2016	28,446	57.75%	18,750	38.07%	2,061	4.18%
2020	33,158	57.45%	23,941	41.48%	615	1.07%
2024	32,151	58.92%	21,648	39.67%	769	1.41%

Though New Jersey is generally Democratic in recent state-wide elections, Cape May County is a mostly Republican county, with the highest percentage of voters registered as Republicans of any county in the state. Despite the county's strong Republican lean, at least one Democrat has won the county in recent years. In 2018, Democrat Jeff Van Drew outpolled Republican Seth Grossman in the county by a margin of 21,595 (52.6%) to 19,003 (46.3%) in that year's congressional election. Van Drew subsequently changed his partisan affiliation in 2019 and won the county as a Republican over Democratic challenger Amy Kennedy by a margin of 34,627 (60.7%) to 21,899 (38.4%). Since the founding of the Republican Party in 1856, the county has voted Democratic for president five times: in 1860, 1912, 1936, 1964, and 1996.

As of October 1, 2021, there were a total of 74,585 registered voters in Cape May County, of whom 31,859 (42.7%) were registered as Republicans, 18,498 (24.8%) were registered as Democrats and 23,325 (31.3%) were registered as unaffiliated. There were 903 voters (1.2%) registered to other parties. Among the county's 2010 Census population, 69.9% were registered to vote, including 81.1% of those ages 18 and over.

Senate Class 1 election results

United States Senate election results for Cape May County, New Jersey1
Year	Republican		Democratic		Third party(ies)	
Year	No.	%	No.	%	No.	%
2024	30,905	59.87%	20,096	38.93%	616	1.19%
2018	24,823	61.02%	14,555	35.78%	1,299	3.19%
2012	22,281	51.73%	19,965	46.35%	826	1.92%
2006	19,506	56.87%	14,038	40.93%	757	2.21%
2000	26,665	60.12%	16,781	37.84%	906	2.04%
1994	16,931	52.24%	14,398	44.43%	1,079	3.33%
1988	22,349	52.84%	19,720	46.63%	223	0.53%
1982	16,310	55.14%	12,875	43.53%	394	1.33%

Senate Class 2 election results

United States Senate election results for Cape May County, New Jersey2
Year	Republican		Democratic		Third party(ies)	
Year	No.	%	No.	%	No.	%
2020	31,317	56.72%	22,952	41.57%	945	1.71%
2014	16,178	57.41%	11,572	41.07%	429	1.52%
2013	10,432	58.75%	7,080	39.87%	244	1.37%
2008	23,697	52.60%	20,374	45.22%	984	2.18%
2002	17,751	53.63%	14,760	44.59%	587	1.77%
1996	22,040	53.49%	17,786	43.17%	1,378	3.34%
1990	13,528	44.02%	16,627	54.11%	573	1.86%
1984	18,365	45.42%	21,859	54.06%	209	0.52%

=== State elections ===
Governor election results

Gubernatorial election results for Cape May County, New Jersey
Year	Republican		Democratic		Third party(ies)	
Year	No.	%	No.	%	No.	%
2025	25,588	58.06%	18,270	41.45%	214	0.49%
2021	24,260	62.75%	14,183	36.69%	218	0.56%
2017	16,118	53.22%	13,566	44.80%	600	1.98%
2013	23,531	71.64%	8,798	26.78%	519	1.58%
2009	18,992	54.34%	13,379	38.28%	2,577	7.37%
2005	16,179	50.88%	14,375	45.21%	1,243	3.91%
2001	17,471	49.46%	17,118	48.46%	735	2.08%
1997	18,227	49.56%	15,395	41.86%	3,159	8.59%
1993	16,518	44.23%	19,904	53.30%	922	2.47%
1989	15,408	43.41%	19,642	55.34%	445	1.25%
1985	23,331	74.70%	7,665	24.54%	239	0.77%
1981	18,488	59.24%	12,274	39.33%	449	1.44%
1977	13,307	45.03%	15,814	53.51%	432	1.46%
1973	18,227	63.57%	10,261	35.79%	185	0.65%
1969	14,532	63.58%	8,050	35.22%	274	1.20%
1965	10,449	47.69%	11,127	50.78%	335	1.53%
1961	11,008	55.41%	8,725	43.92%	133	0.67%
1957	11,929	58.77%	8,349	41.13%	20	0.10%
1953	11,957	64.56%	6,531	35.26%	34	0.18%

== Economy ==
The primary job sectors in Cape May County are related to hotel accommodation, food service, retail, health care/aide, arts/entertainment, and construction. Historically, Cape May County's economy was driven by whaling and farming, until seasonal resorts were built in the 19th century. These industries remain a part of the county's job sector, along with agritourism, and around 30,000 people in the private industry. The largest employer is Morey's Piers, which hires 1,500 people. Cape Regional Medical Center hires over 1,000 people. More than 10,000 people are in the hospitality sector. As of February 2018, the unemployment rate in Cape May County was 14.3%, significantly more than the 5.2% unemployment rate in August 2017. Each year, the unemployment rate peaks in the wintertime and drops in the summertime, reflective of the county's dependence on seasonal tourism-driven jobs. As of February 2018, Cape May County had the highest unemployment rate in New Jersey, followed by neighboring Atlantic and Cumberland counties.

The Bureau of Economic Analysis calculated that the county's gross domestic product was $5.0 billion in 2021, which was ranked 19th in the state and was a 6.4% increase from the prior year.

In 2023, the tourism industry contributes about $7.7 billion worth of income in Cape May County, from 11.6 million visitors. Retail spending was $1.4 billion, food and beverage represented $1.8 billion, while camping and lodging represented about $3.2 billion in expenditures. Recreational activities generated $1.4 billion in expenditures and transportation costs were $530 million. There is little heavy industry in the county due to environmental concerns.

=== Tourism ===
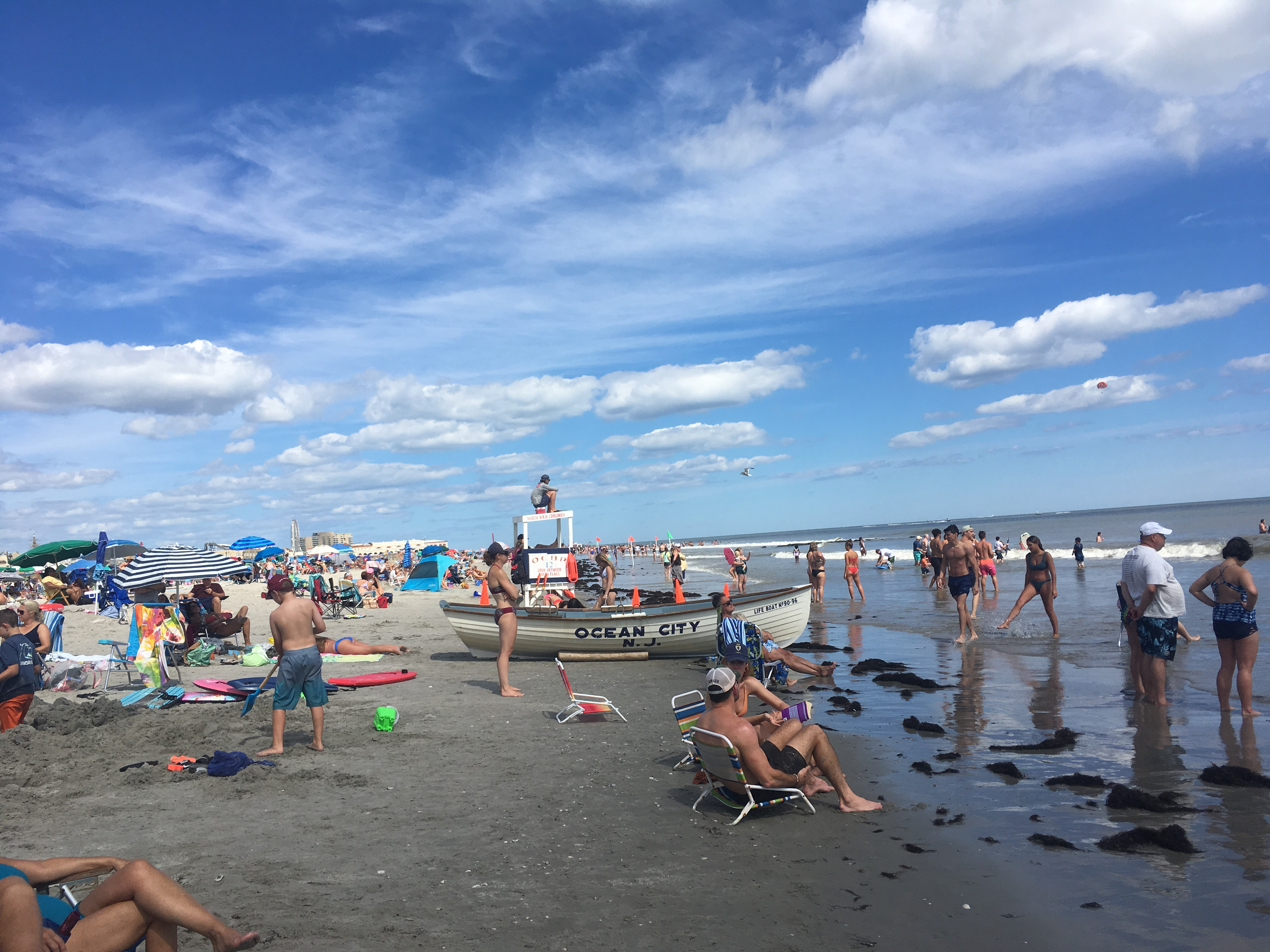
Ocean City, August 2020

The majority of Cape May County's industry is tourism, due to its beaches and location between the Delaware Bay and the Atlantic Ocean. During the summer season (which traditionally ranges from Memorial Day to Labor Day), tourists often outnumber locals 9 to 1. As of 2010, the four largest markets for tourism in Cape May County were Greater Philadelphia, North Jersey, New York, and the Canadian province of Québec.

In addition to sales tax, hotel occupancy tax and other assessments charged throughout the state, tourism-related business in North Wildwood, Wildwood and Wildwood Crest, such as hotels and restaurants, are required to collect an additional 2% tourism sales tax that is used to cover costs for promoting tourism.

Beginning in 1968 the county government began campaigns to attract tourists from Canada. In 1970 it established a tourism office in Montreal and later made strides to get tourists from other parts of Quebec. The county government made efforts to train tourism establishments on how to receive French-speaking Canadian tourists. In 1991, Canadian tourism into Cape May County remained strong despite an economic recession occurring in Canada. As of 1993, most Canadian tourists to the county were Francophones, who typically began their visits during the final two weeks of the month of July, when many Canadians working in the construction and garment sectors receive two-week paid time off. Most of the French Canadian tourists who visit Cape May County stay in hotels in The Wildwoods or campgrounds on the mainland. In the 1990s, Cape May County established an international tourism office in Montréal, along St. Catherine's Street, but closed it around 1995, due to budget cuts. By 2010 the tourism office of Cape May County established a French language coupon booklet. In 2010, Cape May County tourism director estimated that 13% of visitors to the region originated from Quebec.

Beach tags are required for beach access in some of the most popular beaches and are collected under the terms of a 1955 state law that allows oceanfront municipalities to charge "reasonable fees" for providing safety and maintenance at the beaches. The highest seasonal beach tag fee in the county was $35. The sale of daily, weekly and seasonal tags is a major source of revenue for the communities, with the six beachfront communities in Cape May County that charge for beach tags generating $10 million in revenue in 2016. Ocean City brought in $4.1 million in revenue in the 2016 season, the most of any municipality in the state. In the 2017 budget, the projected $4.1 million in fees for beach tag and $3 million for parking were two of Ocean City's biggest revenue sources, accounting for almost 9% of the city's annual budget of almost $80 million. Cape May City, with revenue of $2.2 million, was ranked third in the state. Four of the five municipalities in the state with guarded oceanfront beaches available with free public access are in the county, including Strathmere in Upper Township and the Wildwoods communities of North Wildwood, Wildwood and Wildwood Crest.

=== Fishing and farming ===
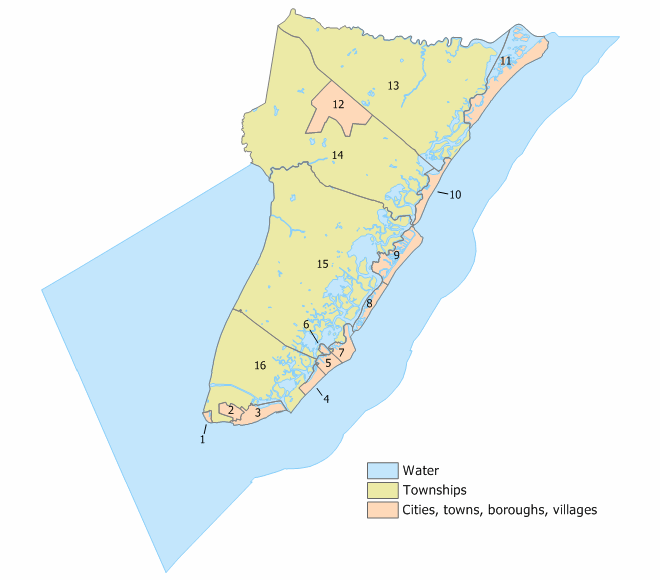
Index map of Cape May County municipalities (click to see index key)

Fishing has been an important industry in Cape May County since at least the 17th century, when the county's first European settlement was founded as a whaling village. In 1693, whaling proved such a successful industry that colonial Governor Andrew Hamilton instituted a 10% tax on whale products. By the mid-1700s, overfishing had diminished the whale population in the region. In the early 1800s, shipbuilding was an important industry, which declined by the 1850s. Fishing remains an important aspect of Cape May County's economy. In 2016, the combined port of Cape May and Wildwood ranked the ninth largest commercial fishing port in the United States as measured by monetary value, as well as the second largest on the east coast, only after New Bedford. Fishermen brought in 47 million lbs (21 million kg) of seafood, mainly scallops, worth $85 million (2016 USD). This was up from $73.7 million in 2009, when the overall market value of the port was estimated at $442 million, making it the fourth most valuable port in the country. In the 1980s, the scallop industry was worth only $15 million in the state of New Jersey. In 1990, laws limiting the catch and area of scallops led to a healthier and steadier population to harvest, which allowed for growth in the industry. Cold Spring Fish and Supply Company provides 500 jobs and is the county's third-largest employer.

Farming became an important industry in the county by the 19th century, when nearly 70,000 acres (28,000 ha), or about 40% of the county's land area, was involved in farming. The industry's popularity led to the first freight railroad in 1863, and continued to be a fixture of the county's economy until the 1960s. There is an annual lima bean festival in West Cape May featuring foods made with the locally grown lima beans.

== Education ==
There are 16 school districts operating schools, two of them countywide, and three non-operating school districts.

School districts include:

K-12

- Cape May County Special Services School District (countywide for special education)
- Middle Township Public Schools
- Ocean City School District
- Wildwood City School District

Secondary

- Cape May County Technical School District (countywide)
- Lower Cape May Regional School District

Elementary (K-8, except as noted)

- Avalon School District
- Cape May City School District (K-6)
- Dennis Township Public Schools
- Lower Township School District (K-6)
- North Wildwood School District
- Stone Harbor School District
- Upper Township School District
- West Cape May School District (K-6)
- Woodbine School District
- Wildwood Crest School District

Non-operational

- Cape May Point School District (non-operating since 1931)
- Sea Isle City School District (non-operating since 2012)
- West Wildwood School District

There are 25 public elementary and/or middle schools in Cape May County, including two in Avalon and Stone Harbor (which, since 2011, agree to share each other's schools), one in Cape May, two in Dennis Township, five in Lower Township, three in Middle Township, one in North Wildwood, two in Ocean City, three in Upper Township, one in West Cape May, three in Wildwood, one in Wildwood Crest, and one in Woodbine.

The following public high schools are in the county:

- Cape May County Technical High School
- Lower Cape May Regional High School,
- Middle Township High School
- Ocean City High School
- Wildwood High School

There are also nine private schools in the county:

- Bishop McHugh Regional Catholic School (Catholic; Cape May Courthouse)
- Cape Christian Academy (Christian; Cape May Courthouse)
- Cape Trinity Catholic School (Catholic; Wildwood)
- Central Bible Church (Presbyterian; Wildwood)
- Families United Network Academy (Christian; Ocean View)
- Rio Grande Baptist Academy (Baptist; Rio Grande)
- Tomorrow's World Early Education (Non-religious, Montessori; Marmora)
- Westminster Christian Academy (Calvinist; Ocean City)
- Wildwood Catholic Academy (Catholic; Wildwood)

As of 2013, 31% of county residents had at least a bachelor's degree, and 89.7% had at least a high school diploma. In 1973, Atlantic Community College began offering night classes at Middle Township High School. In 1999, the college name was formally changed to Atlantic Cape Community College, and a full service campus was opened in 2005 in Cape May Court House. The community college has partnerships with Fairleigh Dickinson University, Rutgers University, and Stockton University.

The Cape May County Library has locations in Cape May, Cape May Court House, Lower Township, Stone Harbor, Sea Isle, Upper Township, Wildwood Crest, and Woodbine, as well as a bookmobile. Ocean City also has its own independent library.

== Services ==
Cape Regional Medical Center opened as Burdette Tomlin Memorial Hospital in 1950, keeping that name until 2007. It is the only hospital in the county. The facility has expanded over time since its foundation, and now has 242 beds, with a staff of 1,060 people, to service the population and tourists in the county. AtlantiCare opened two urgent care centers in the county since the 1990s. From 2010 to 2015, opioid prescriptions rose 11%, in terms of the amount of morphine milligram equivalents (MME) per person. This rise was among the top 20% of counties nationally, and the second-highest in New Jersey. In the period from 2011 to 2015, health conditions in the county deteriorated, falling to 19th in a survey of New Jersey's 21 counties for child well-being; only neighboring Cumberland and Atlantic counties were worse. The county mortality rate was 13.7%, the highest in the state, which is largely due to the county's large elderly population.

Beesley's Point Generating Station was a coal-based power plant located in Upper Township that generated 447 megawatts of power. The coal plant released among the most emissions of any New Jersey station. The plant's fuel source was scheduled to be changed to natural gas, pending the construction of the Atlantic Reliability Link through the Pinelands National Reserve. In 2017, the Pinelands Commission approved the proposed 22 mi (35 km) pipeline, which would be built under area roads. In response, the New Jersey Sierra Club and the Pinelands Preservation Alliance sued to stop the construction. Prospective green energy projects include the Deepwater Wind-leased Delaware Wind Energy Area, located about 16 mi (26 km) southeast of Cape May. The prospective wind turbines there are capable of generating 3,500 MW of electricity.

== Municipalities ==
The 16 municipalities in Cape May County (with 2010 Census data for population, housing units and area; along with communities within each municipalities for which census-designated places are noted with their population) are:

Municipality (with map key)	Map key	Mun. type	Permanent Population	Summer Population	Housing units	Total area	Water area	Land area	Pop. density	Housing density	School district	Communities
Avalon	9	borough	1,243	35,028	5,434	4.93	0.77	4.15	321.3	1,308.8	Middle Township (9–12) (S/R); Avalon (5–8); Stone Harbor (K-4)	
Cape; May	3	city	2,768	45,874	4,155	2.74	0.34	2.40	1,500.6	1,728.5	Lower Cape May (7–12); Cape May (PK-6)	
Cape May; Point	1	borough	305	4,100	619	0.31	0.02	0.30	984.5	2,094.2	Lower Cape May (7–12); Cape May (PK-6) (S/R)	
Dennis; Township	14	township	6,285	37,339	2,672	64.33	3.53	60.80	106.4	43.9	Middle Township (9–12) (S/R); Dennis Township (PK-8)	Belleplain CDP (614); Clermont; Dennisville CDP (830); Ocean View CDP (685); South Dennis CDP (1,703); South Seaville CDP (695)
Lower; Township	16	township	22,057	99,786	14,507	31.01	3.27	27.74	824.3	523.0	Lower Cape May (7–12); Lower Township (PK-6)	Diamond Beach CDP (203); Erma CDP (2,031); Miami Beach; North Cape May CDP (4,007); Rio Grande CDP (part; 3,610); Villas CDP (9,134)
Middle; Township	15	township	20,380	71,321	9,296	82.96	12.62	70.33	268.9	132.2	Middle Township	Burleigh CDP (766); Cape May Court House CDP (5,573); Dias Creek; Goshen CDP (400); Green Creek; Mayville; Nummytown; Pierces Point; Rio Grande CDP (part; 3,610); Swainton; Whitesboro CDP (2,300)
North; Wildwood	7	city	3,621	70,118	8,840	2.13	0.38	1.75	2,305.8	5,044.1	Wildwood (9–12) (S/R); North Wildwood (K-8)	
Ocean; City	11	city	11,229	139,654	20,871	10.80	4.46	6.33	1,847.7	3,295.7	Ocean City	
Sea Isle; City	10	city	2,104	44,820	6,900	2.53	0.36	2.17	974.5	3,180.8	Ocean City (S/R)	
Stone; Harbor	8	borough	796	22,528	3,247	1.96	0.56	1.40	619.6	2,323.3	Middle Township (9–12) (S/R); Avalon (5–8); Stone Harbor (K-4)	
Upper; Township	13	township	12,539	45,940	6,341	68.69	6.54	62.15	199.1	102.0	Ocean City (9–12) (S/R); Upper Township (K-8)	Beesley's Point CDP (816); Marmora CDP (2,413); Marshallville CDP (376); Palermo CDP (3,183); Petersburg; Seaville CDP (695); Strathmere CDP (137); Tuckahoe CDP (357)
West Cape; May	2	borough	1,010	8,590	1,043	1.18	0.01	1.17	1.165	895.1	Lower Cape May (7–12); West Cape May (PK-6)	
West; Wildwood	6	borough	540	7,468	893	0.35	0.07	0.28	2,188.4	3,240.9	Wildwood (S/R)	
Wildwood	5	city	5,157	67,258	6,843	1.39	0.09	1.30	4,082.0	5,245.7	Wildwood	
Wildwood; Crest	4	borough	3,101	54,633	5,569	1.31	0.18	1.13	2,884.0	4,911.6	Wildwood (9–12) (S/R); Wildwood Crest (PK-8)	
Woodbine	12	borough	2,128	9,483	1,079	8.02	0.00	8.02	308.2	134.5	Middle Township (S/R)	
Cape May		county	95,263	763,940	98,309	620.42	368.99	251.42	386.9	391.0		

Interactive map of municipalities in Cape May County.

== Recreation ==
Cape May County Park & Zoo is located in Cape May Court House.

=== Parks and recreation ===
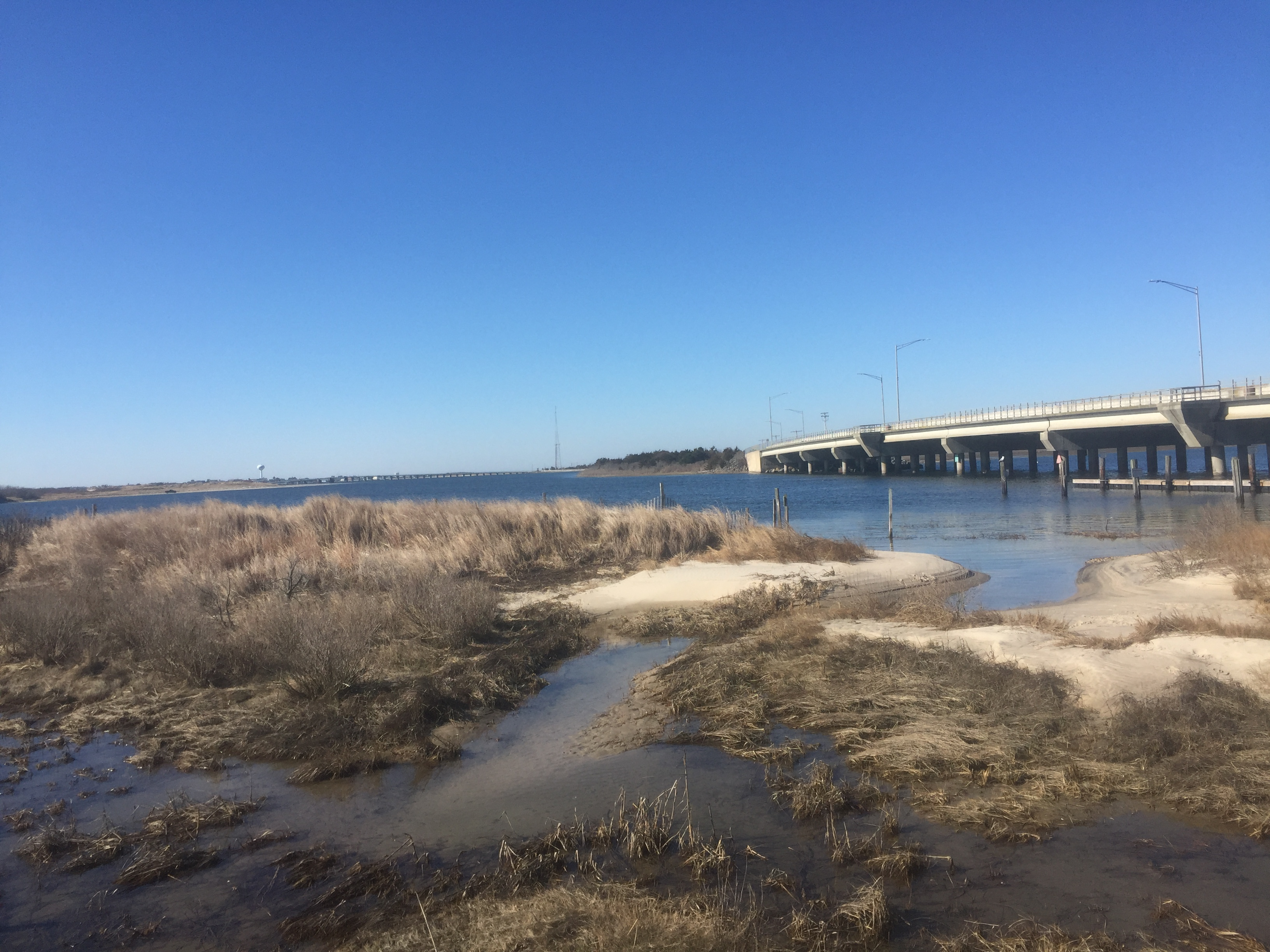
Corson's Inlet State Park along the Jersey Shore

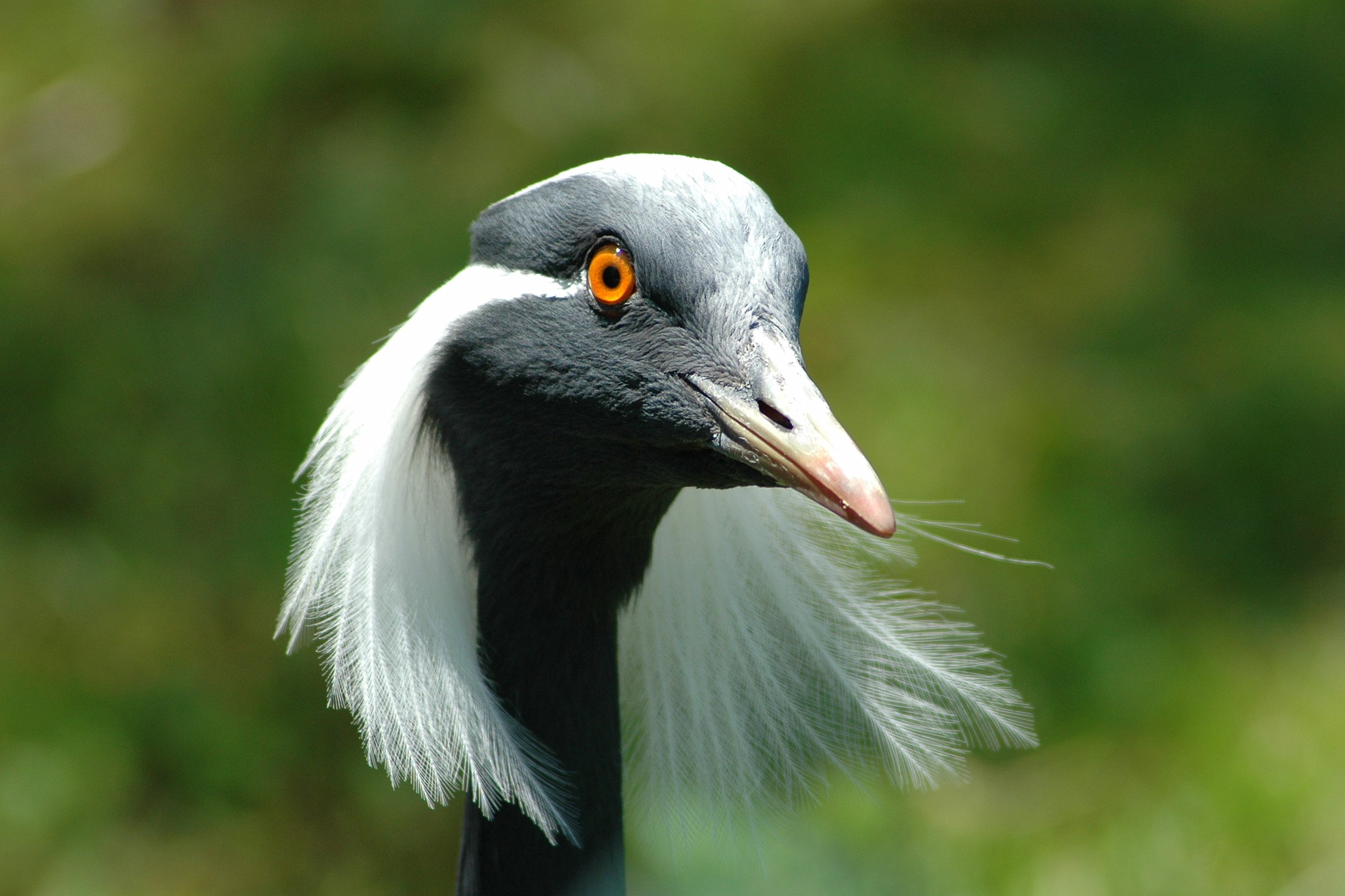
A demoiselle crane at Cape May County Park & Zoo

As of 2015, 49% of the lands in Cape May County were preserved open space. On November 9, 1989, the voters of Cape May County approved the Open Space Preservation Tax, which generates $4.9 million each year. Since then, the program spent $65 million to preserve open space, farmlands, and historic sites.

Belleplain State Forest was established in 1928 in northwestern Cape May County and adjacent Cumberland County, and consists of 21,254 acres (8,601 ha) of young pine, oak, and Atlantic white cedar trees. Corson's Inlet State Park was established in 1969 near the southern end of Ocean City to protect and preserve one of the last undeveloped areas of land along the New Jersey coastline. Cape May Point State Park was established at the southern end of the county in 1974, having been previously used as a military base until the Ash Wednesday Storm of 1962 damaged the facility. There are 10 wildlife management areas in the county, including Peaslee, which extends into neighboring Cumberland County, and Tuckahoe/MacNamara, which extends into neighboring Atlantic County.

In 1942, a 40 acres (16 ha) area of wooded land was donated to the county, which housed the 4-H fair. In November 1962, county residents approved a referendum to create a park commission, which was established in 1967 to maintain the county's parks. The lands donated in 1942 became Park Central, and is now over 200 acres (81 ha). In 1978, the Cape May County Park & Zoo was created within Park Central, which houses 250 species of animals. Nearby Cape May County Park East has basketball and tennis courts. Park North is the Richard M. Cameron Wildlife Sanctuary, located in Palermo. Park South is the Fishing Creek Wildlife Preserve, which is 1,700 acres (690 ha) of wetlands and trails. The 93 acres (38 ha) undeveloped Great Sound State Park is in Middle Township.

In 1978, the New Jersey Pinelands National Reserve became the first National Reserve in the United States, a 1,100,000 acres (450,000 ha) region of South Jersey that spans seven counties, including Cape May. The act, and additional legislation from the New Jersey legislature, created the Pinelands Commission, which manages the growth in the Pine Barrens, and coordinates federal, state, and local governments. Each county appoints a commissioner, and since January 2018, Woodbine mayor William Pikolycky has represented the county. From 1988 until 2011, the National Park Service operated the New Jersey Coastal Heritage Trail Route, which promoted awareness and protection of nearly 300 mi (480 km) of New Jersey coastline. In 1989, the Cape May National Wildlife Refuge was established from lands purchased by the Nature Conservancy, and has grown in size since its establishment.

=== Breweries, distilleries, and wineries ===
Cape May Brewing Company opened in 2011 at the Cape May Airport, and by 2015 was the third-largest brewer in New Jersey. Tuckahoe Brewing also opened in 2011 in Ocean View, but moved to a bigger facility in Egg Harbor Township in neighboring Atlantic County in 2015. In 2015, Slack Tide Brew opened in Clermont. In 2016, Ludlam Island Brewery opened in the former location of Tuckahoe Brewing, after originally seeking to open the facility in Sea Isle City. Also in 2016, Cold Spring Brewing began operations out of a barn from 1804, as part of Historic Cold Spring Village, and 7 Mile Brewery opened in Cape May Court House. In 2017, Avalon Brew Pub opened in Avalon, and Bucket Brigade Brewery opened in Cape May Court House. Mudhen Brewery opened in Wildwood in April 2018. Gusto Brewery opened in December 2018 in North Cape May.

The first distillery to open in the county since the prohibition era was Lazy Eye Distillery, which opened a second facility in Wildwood in 2015 after opening its first facility in Atlantic County in 2014. In the same year, Cape May Distillery opened in Green Creek. In 2017, Nauti Spirits opened in Cape May on a 60 acres (24 ha) farm.

In 2007, the New Jersey Department of Agriculture designated Atlantic, Cape May, Cumberland, and Ocean counties as the Outer Coastal Plain American Viticultural Area (AVA) in 2007, recognizing the area as well-suited for grape growing. In late 2014, local wineries sought for a distinct Cape May Peninsula AVA. As of 2015, there were six wineries in the county. Cape May Winery & Vineyard opened in 1995 in North Cape May as the first commercial winery in the county. Turdo Vineyards & Winery opened to the public in North Cape May in 2004. Natali Vineyards opened in 2007 in the Goshen section of Middle Township. In 2009, Hawk Haven Vineyard & Winery opened to the public in the Rio Grande section of Lower Township. In 2012, Jessie Creek Winery opened in Cape May Court House, and in the same year, Willow Creek Winery opened in West Cape May.

== Transportation ==
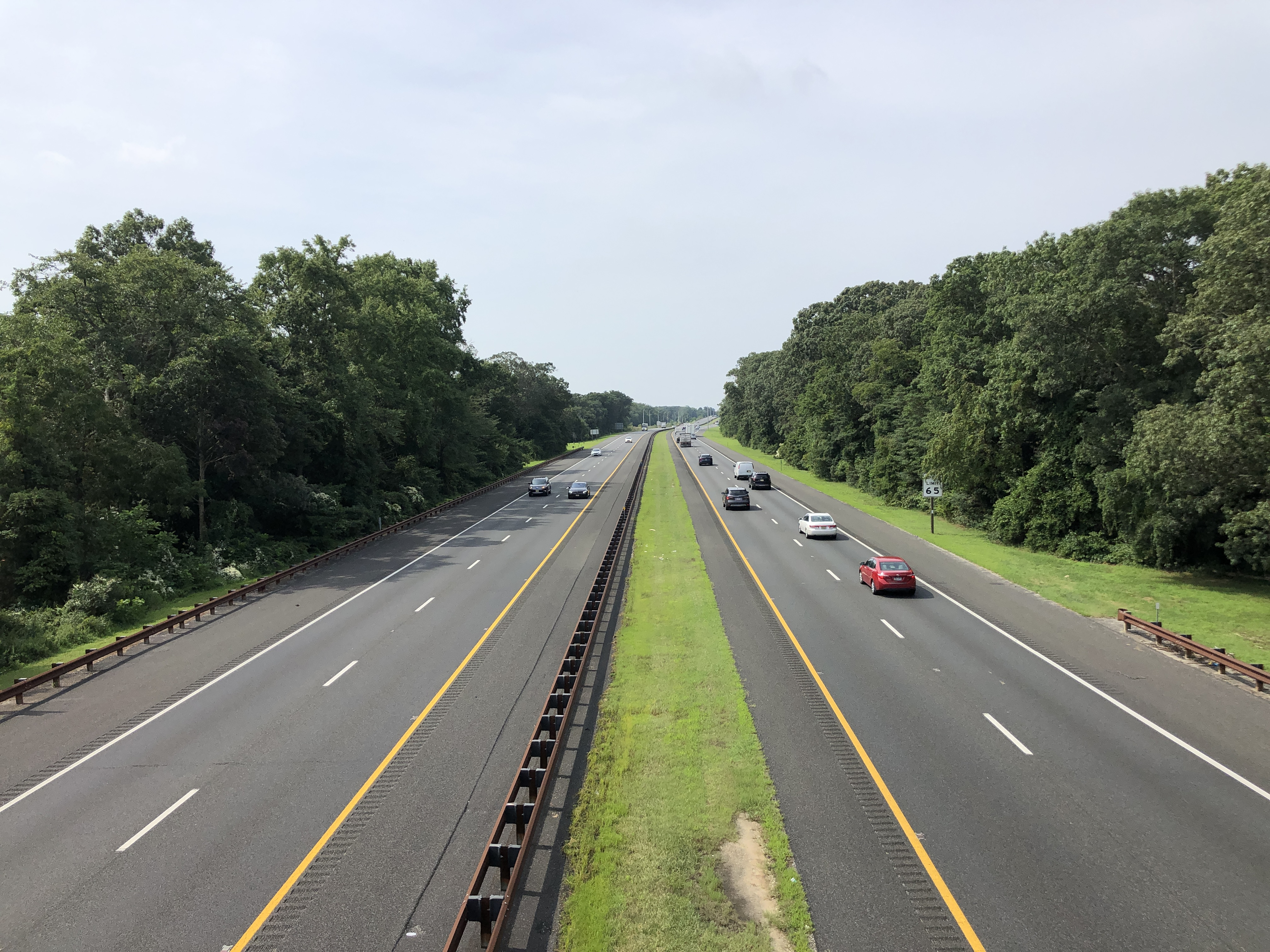
Garden State Parkway southbound in Cape May County

The indigenous population left behind a series of trails across Cape May County by the late 17th century. In 1695, John Somers operated the first ferry service across the Great Egg Harbor Bay to Beesley's Point in Cape May County. Beginning in 1697 and completed in 1707, the residents of Cape May County financed the construction of a road running from Cape May to the ferry in Beesley's Point, and onward to Burlington. Roads were built across the county to connect with the court house, but in low-lying areas these routes were corduroy roads, built from a series of logs. Local businessmen built the Dennis Creek Causeway in 1803, which eventually became NJ 47, which contributed to the growth of towns along the Delaware Bay, although people traveled to the county more often by steamboat.

In August 1863, the Cape May and Millville Railroad opened, connecting the county more quickly to points to the northwest. The railroad shipped freight from the county's many farms, and brought more people to the area, contributing to the development of coastal resorts. Travelers often brought their lunch in shoe boxes, leading to their nickname "shoobies". By 1892, much of the county was accessible by railroad, including all of the barrier islands. A second rail line was added in 1893 that connected Cape May to a branch of the rail line that ran from Atlantic City to Camden. By the 1890s, bicycling became common throughout the county, and bikeriders successfully lobbied the county to build better roads. Between 1900 and 1915, the county government built over 100 miles of gravel roads, a fact promoted in a county promotional brochure, but also the cause of controversies. County engineer N. C. Price was dismissed in 1903 due to accusations of poor building materials and inflated costs, and in 1921, two freeholders were jailed for defrauding the county, resulting in a smaller board of freeholders.

In 1916, the New Jersey legislature created the state highway system, taking responsibility for the maintenance and building of major roads. In 1917, the road between Cape May and Seaville became Route 14, which was renumbered Route 4 in 1927, and later U.S. 9 by the 1940s. The road ran the length of the state, and connected Cape May County with Atlantic County via the Beesley's Point Bridge built in 1928. From 1934 to 1946, the Cape May County Bridge Commission issued bonds and secured funding for five toll bridges to connect the barrier islands with each other. By the 1950s, state routes 47, 49, 50, 52, and 83 were established, connecting various municipalities.

In 1956, the Great Egg Harbor Bridge opened, connecting the county with Atlantic County and points north and west via the Garden State Parkway. A parallel bridge carrying northbound traffic of the Garden State Parkway opened in 1973. The road brings hundreds of thousands of people to the county during the summertime. The parkway passes through the length of the county, and has its southern terminus, known as Exit Zero, in Lower Township, connecting with U.S. Route 9. Further transportation connections were made after the Cape May–Lewes Ferry began operation in 1964, which can carry up to 100 cars and 800 people on its fleet of five boats. In 1971, Route 147 replaced county routes for the roadway from North Wildwood to U.S. 9, and in the same year, Route 162 was established for a new bridge over the Cape May Canal. In 1972, U.S. 9 was relocated from its southern terminus in Cape May to the ferry; the former route was redesignated Route 109. Route 347 was designated in the 1990s as an alternate route to Route 47.

The county has a total of 1,036.15 miles (1,667.52 km) of roadways, of which 730.07 miles (1,174.93 km) are maintained by the local municipality, 200.98 miles (323.45 km) by Cape May County, 74.18 miles (119.38 km) by the New Jersey Department of Transportation and 30.92 miles (49.76 km) by the New Jersey Turnpike Authority. There are 23 bridges owned by the county, including a series of causeways and bridges connecting the five barrier islands to the mainland.

There is limited public transportation within the county. The ensuing traffic congestion during summer months causes roadway congestion. NJ Transit buses operate the following lines in and out of the county: 313, 315, 316, 319, 507, 509, 510, and 552. The Great American Trolley Company operates private trolleys in Cape May, the Wildwoods, and Ocean City. The county also has a Fare Free Transportation system for limited populations. There are three airports in the county. The oldest is Ocean City Municipal Airport, opened in 1937. In 1941, Cape May Airport opened about 5 mi (8.0 km) north of Cape May, originally as Naval Air Station Wildwood. Woodbine Municipal Airport opened in 1945.

In 2009, the Ocean City metropolitan statistical area, which encompasses all of Cape May County, ranked as the sixth highest in the United States for percentage of commuters who walked to work (8.4%).

== See also ==
- National Register of Historic Places listings in Cape May County, New Jersey
- South Seaville Camp Meeting
