= Green Creek, New Jersey =

Populated place in Cape May County, New Jersey, US

- Unincorporated community
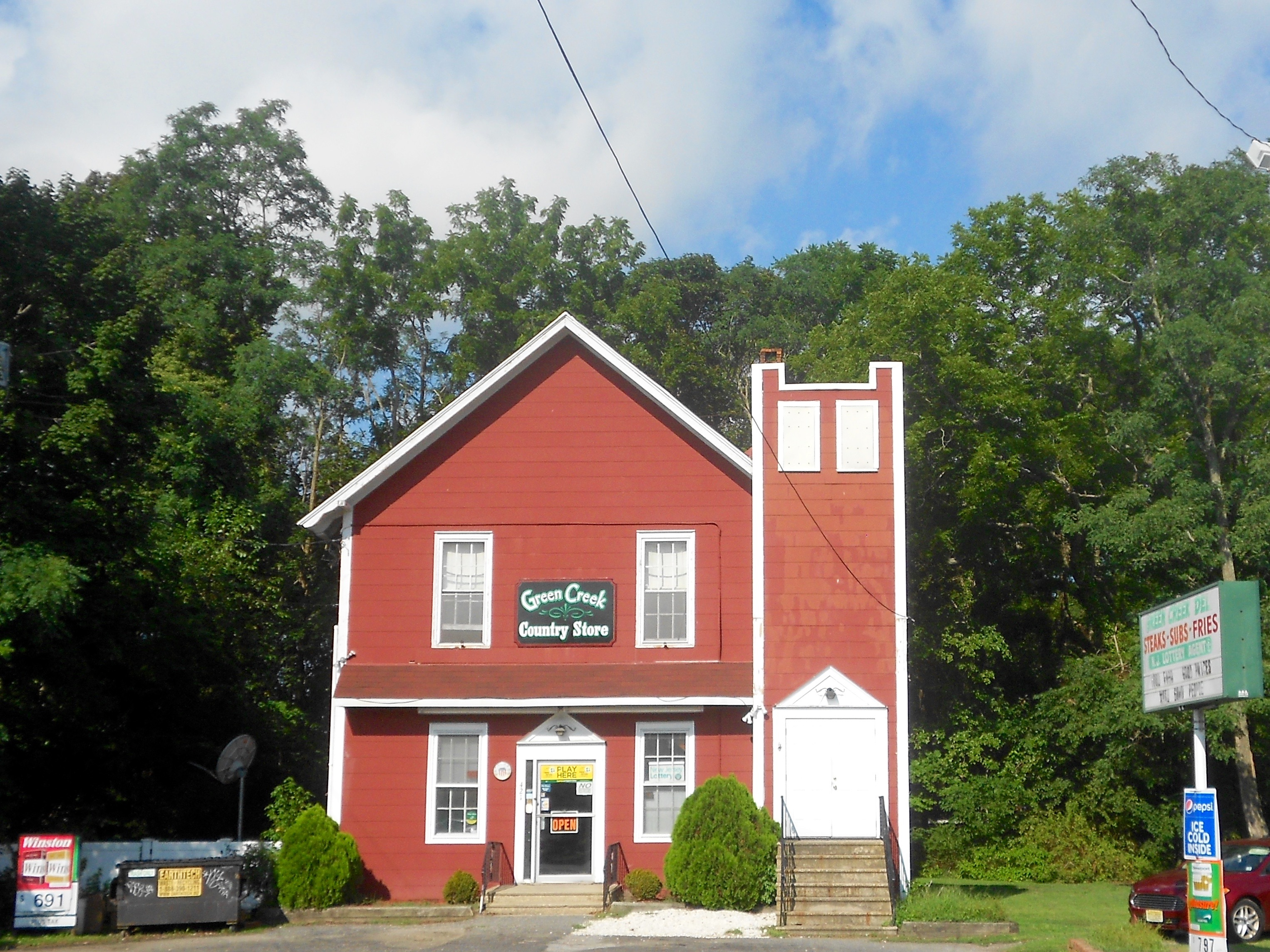
- Store on Delsea Drive

- Green Creek's location in Cape May County (Inset: Cape May County in New Jersey) Green Creek (New Jersey) Green Creek (the United States)
- Coordinates: 39°02′46″N 74°54′05″W
- Country: United States
- State: New Jersey
- County: Cape May
- Township: Middle
- Elevation: 13 ft (4.0 m)
- Time zone: UTC−05:00 (Eastern (EST))
  - Summer (DST): UTC−04:00 (EDT)
- ZIP Code: 08219
- Area codes: 609, 640
- FIPS code: 34-34009
- GNIS feature ID: 876776
- Other name: Greencreek

Green Creek is an unincorporated community located within Middle Township, in Cape May County, in the U.S. state of New Jersey. It is located on Route 47 (Delsea Drive). It is a very low-lying area with a highest elevation of just above 20 feet (6.1 m). The community is located about 3 miles (4.8 km) west of Rio Grande and about 2 miles (3.2 km) from the Delaware Bay. It is mostly residential with areas of agriculture and commerce along the main road, Delsea Drive (Route 47). The United States Postal Service ZIP Code is 08219. The post office was established in 1829 with Matthew Marcy as the first postmaster.

== Geography ==
Green Creek is located at 39°02′46″N 74°54′05″W (39.046224, -74.901283). It lies 13 feet (4 m) above sea level.

== Environment ==
Aside from residential usage, Green Creek comprises a mixture of broad-leaf woodland and salt marsh. There is an area of protected dry grassland part of the Cape May National Wildlife Refuge, located off Burleigh Road.

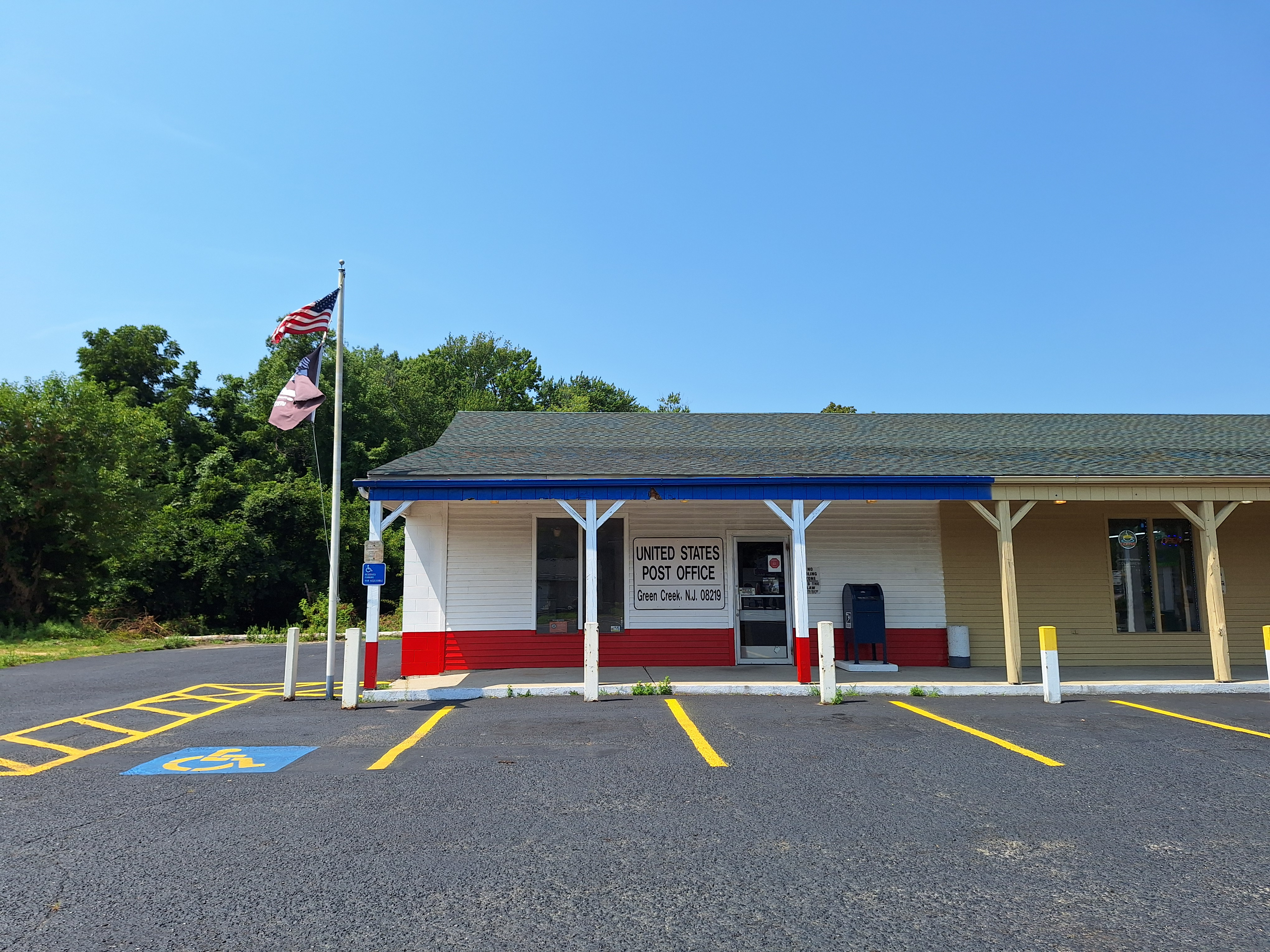
Post Office

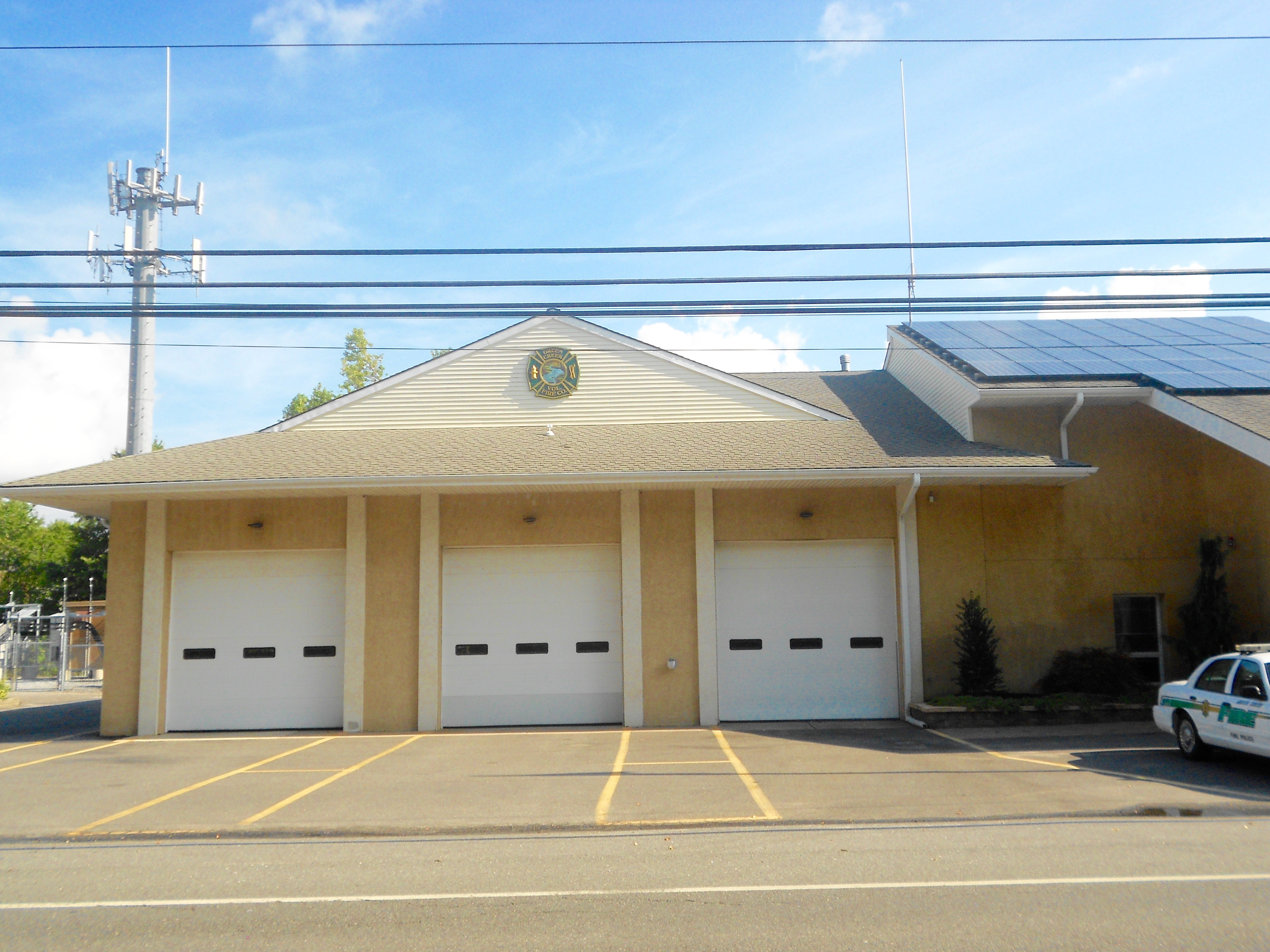
Fire station on Bay Shore Road
