= Belleplain, New Jersey =

Populated place in Cape May County, New Jersey, US

- Census-designated place
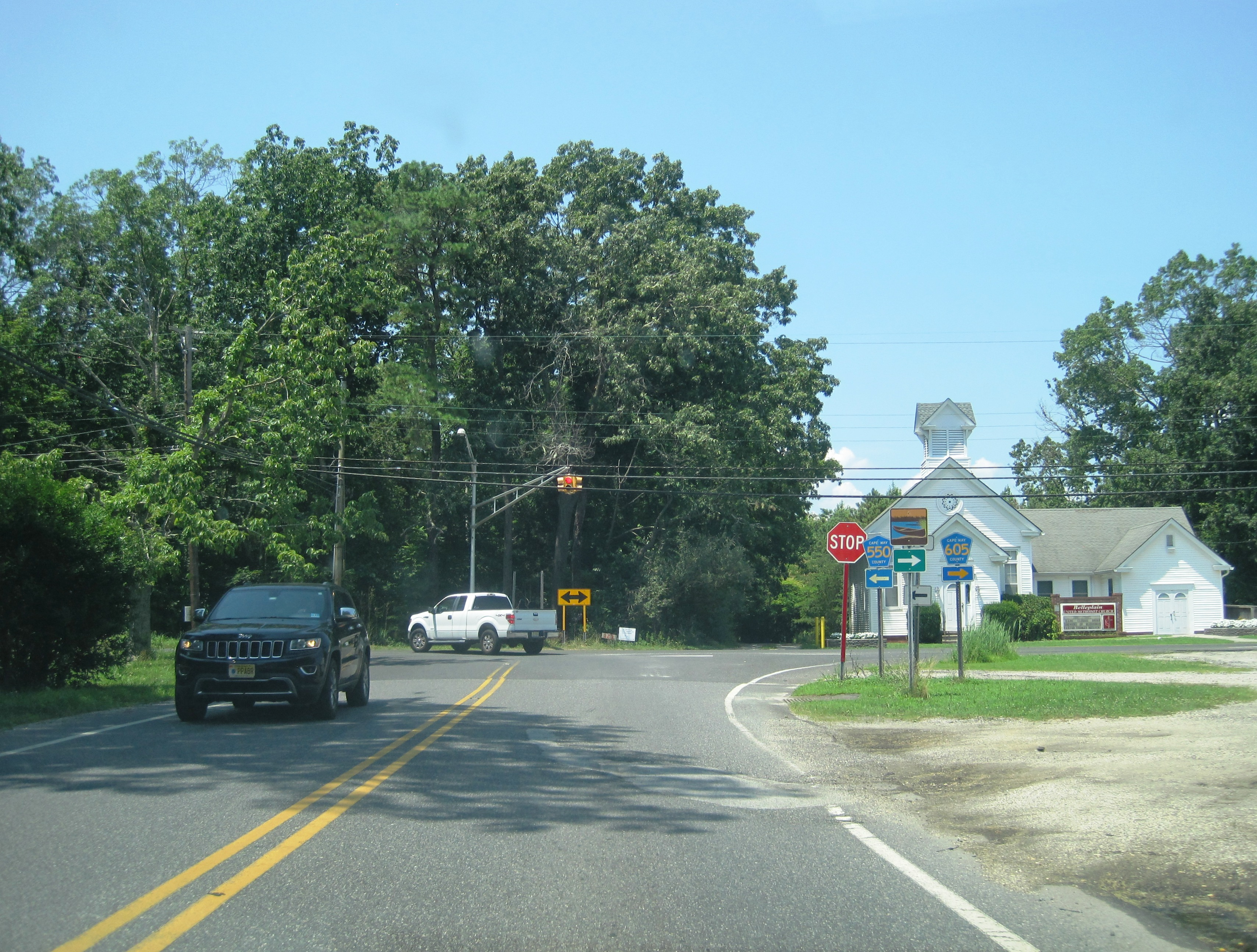
- Center of Belleplain on County Route 550

- Location in Cape May County Location in New Jersey Location in the United States
- Coordinates: 39°15′37″N 74°52′25″W
- Country: United States
- State: New Jersey
- County: Cape May
- Township: Dennis

Area
  - Total: 7.35 sq mi (19.04 km^{2})
  - Land: 7.34 sq mi (19.01 km^{2})
  - Water: 0.012 sq mi (0.03 km^{2}) 0.15%
- Elevation: 43 ft (13 m)

Population (2020)
  - Total: 614
  - Density: 84/sq mi (32.3/km^{2})
- Time zone: UTC−05:00 (Eastern (EST))
  - Summer (DST): UTC−04:00 (Eastern (EDT))
- ZIP Code: 08270 - Woodbine
- Area code: 609
- FIPS code: 34-04660
- GNIS feature ID: 02629044

Belleplain is an unincorporated community and census-designated place (CDP) located within Dennis Township in Cape May County, in the U.S. state of New Jersey. As of the 2020 census, Belleplain had a population of 614.

== Geography ==
According to the United States Census Bureau, Belleplain had a total area of 7.405 square miles (19.178 km^{2}), including 7.394 square miles (19.150 km^{2}) of land and 0.011 square miles (0.029 km^{2}) of water (0.15%).

== Demographics ==
Historical population
Census	Pop.	Note	%±
2010	597		—
2020	614		2.8%
Population sources: 2010 2020

Belleplain first appeared as a census designated place in the 2010 U.S. census.

=== 2020 census ===
Belleplain CDP, New Jersey – Racial and ethnic composition Note: the US Census treats Hispanic/Latino as an ethnic category. This table excludes Latinos from the racial categories and assigns them to a separate category. Hispanics/Latinos may be of any race.
Race / Ethnicity (NH = Non-Hispanic)	Pop 2010	Pop 2020	% 2010	% 2020
White alone (NH)	563	547	94.30%	89.09%
Black or African American alone (NH)	4	6	0.67%	0.98%
Native American or Alaska Native alone (NH)	2	0	0.34%	0.00%
Asian alone (NH)	1	1	0.17%	0.16%
Native Hawaiian or Pacific Islander alone (NH)	0	0	0.00%	0.00%
Other race alone (NH)	0	3	0.00%	0.49%
Mixed race or Multiracial (NH)	8	34	1.34%	5.54%
Hispanic or Latino (any race)	19	23	3.18%	3.75%
Total	597	614	100.00%	100.00%

=== 2010 census ===
The 2010 United States census counted 597 people, 218 households, and 171 families in the CDP. The population density was 80.7 per square mile (31.2/km^{2}). There were 230 housing units at an average density of 31.1 per square mile (12.0/km^{2}). The racial makeup was 95.48% (570) White, 0.67% (4) Black or African American, 0.34% (2) Native American, 0.17% (1) Asian, 0.00% (0) Pacific Islander, 1.01% (6) from other races, and 2.35% (14) from two or more races. Hispanic or Latino of any race were 3.18% (19) of the population.

Of the 218 households, 26.6% had children under the age of 18; 61.0% were married couples living together; 11.0% had a female householder with no husband present and 21.6% were non-families. Of all households, 16.1% were made up of individuals and 8.3% had someone living alone who was 65 years of age or older. The average household size was 2.74 and the average family size was 3.02.

21.8% of the population were under the age of 18, 7.7% from 18 to 24, 24.1% from 25 to 44, 31.5% from 45 to 64, and 14.9% who were 65 years of age or older. The median age was 41.8 years. For every 100 females, the population had 97.0 males. For every 100 females ages 18 and older there were 98.7 males.

== Education ==
As with other parts of Dennis Township, the area is zoned to Dennis Township Public Schools (for grades K-8) and Middle Township Public Schools (for high school). The latter operates Middle Township High School.

Countywide schools include Cape May County Technical High School and Cape May County Special Services School District.
