= William S. Townsend House =

Historic house in New Jersey, United States

- U.S. National Register of Historic Places
- U.S. Historic district – Contributing property
- New Jersey Register of Historic Places
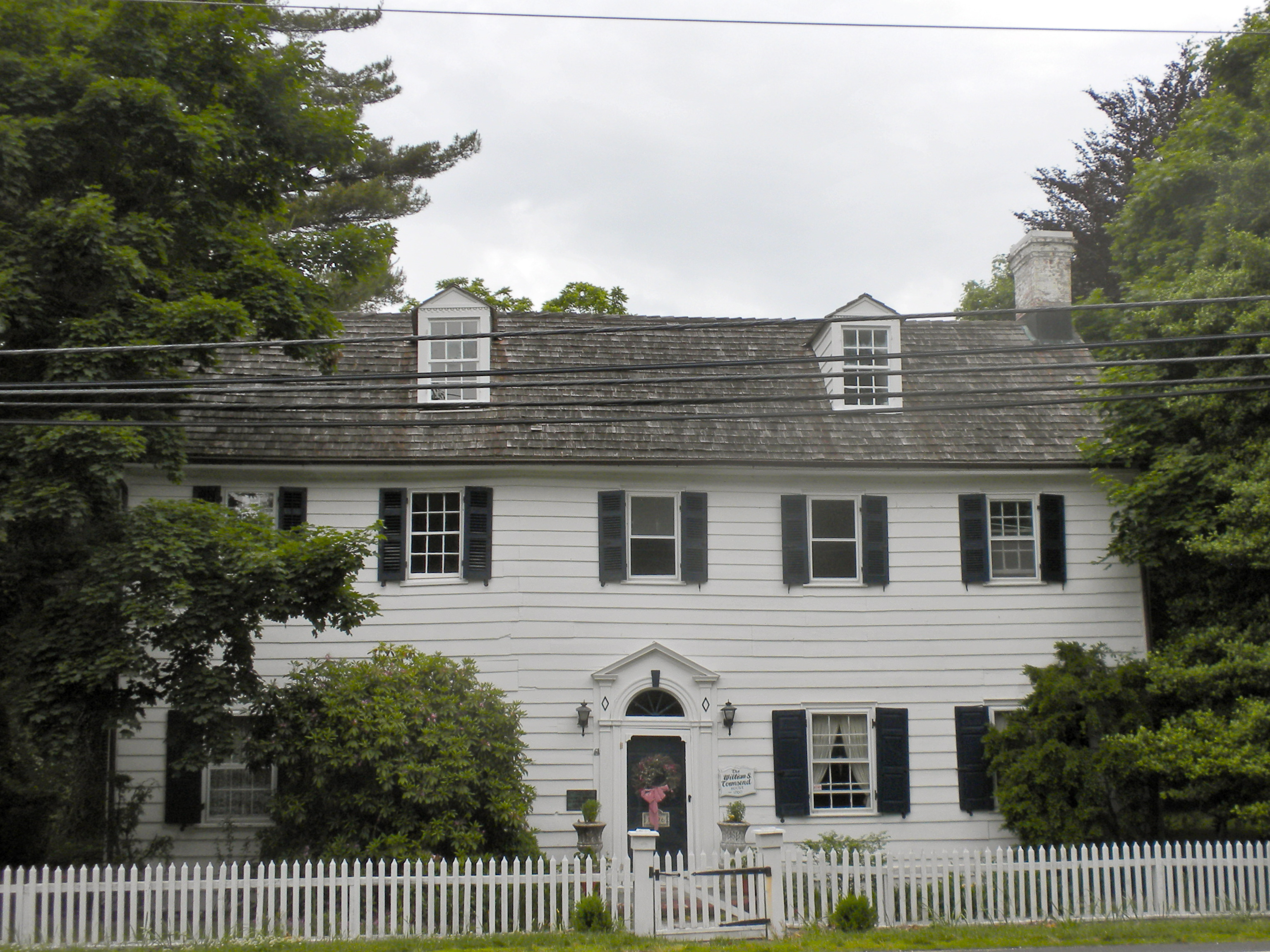

- Location within Cape May County, New Jersey Location within New Jersey Location within the United States
- Location: 96 Delsea Drive, Dennisville, New Jersey
- Coordinates: 39°11′35″N 74°49′56″W
- Area: 7 acres (2.8 ha)
- Built: c. 1820
- Part of: Dennisville Historic District (ID16000387)
- NRHP reference No.: 84002618
- NJRHP No.: 996

Significant dates
- Added to NRHP: April 5, 1984
- Designated CP: June 21, 2016
- Designated NJRHP: March 1, 1984

The William S. Townsend House is located at 96 Delsea Drive (New Jersey Route 47) in the Dennisville section of Dennis Township in Cape May County, New Jersey, United States. The oldest section of the historic house was built around 1820. It was documented by the Historic American Buildings Survey (HABS) in 1961. It was added to the National Register of Historic Places on April 5, 1984, for its significance in architecture and politics/government. The house was later listed as a contributing property of the Dennisville Historic District on June 21, 2016.

William S. Townsend was a wealthy farmer and merchant in the area. The oldest section of the house was built around 1820 by a member of the Ludlam family. It was expanded by Townsend around 1835 and again around 1845. According to the nomination form, Henry Clay visited Townsend in 1847.

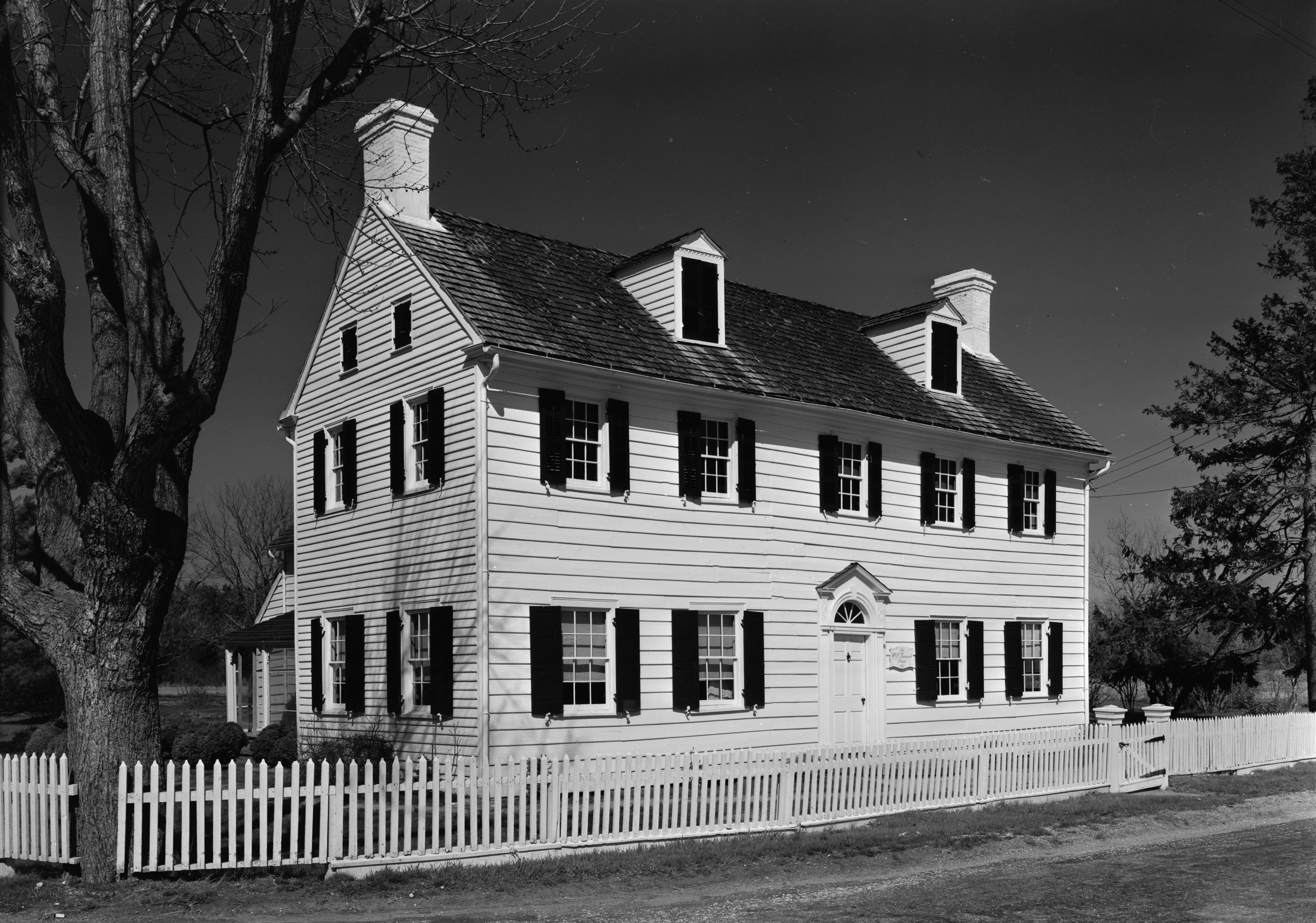
HABS photo from 1961

== See also ==
- National Register of Historic Places listings in Cape May County, New Jersey
