= Dennisville Historic District =

Historic district in New Jersey, United States

- U.S. National Register of Historic Places
- U.S. Historic district
- New Jersey Register of Historic Places
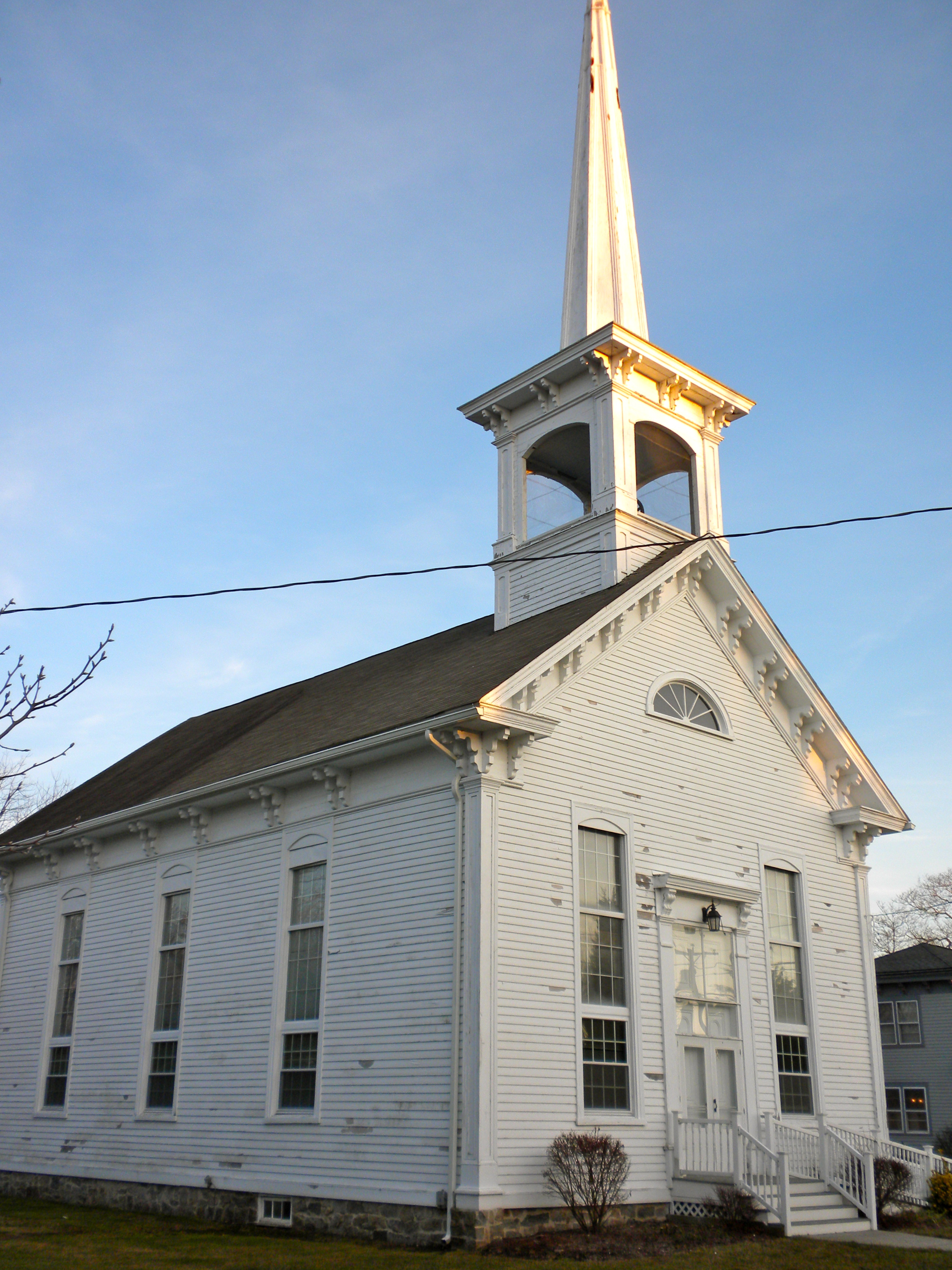
- Methodist Church, built 1870

- Location within Cape May County, New Jersey Location within New Jersey Location within the United States
- Location: Petersburg Road, Main Street, Church Road, Hall Avenue, Fidler and Academy Roads, and NJ 47; Dennisville, New Jersey
- Coordinates: 39°11′34″N 74°49′16″W
- Area: 60 acres (24 ha)
- Architect: Frank Wentzell
- Architectural style: Late Gothic Revival, Greek Revival, Queen Anne
- NRHP reference No.: 87000848 (original); 16000387 (increase)
- NJRHP No.: 990

Significant dates
- Added to NRHP: November 24, 1987
- Boundary increase: June 21, 2016
- Designated NJRHP: April 14, 1987

The Dennisville Historic District is a 60-acre (24 ha) national historic district in the Dennisville section of Dennis Township in Cape May County, New Jersey. The district is bounded by Petersburg Road, Main Street, Church Road, Hall Avenue, Fidler and Academy Roads, and Route 47. It was added to the National Register of Historic Places on November 24, 1987, for its significance in architecture, industry and maritime history. The district includes 58 contributing buildings. The district boundary was increased in 2016 and now includes the William S. Townsend House, which was previously listed individually.

== History ==
Dennisville, originally named Dennis Creek, was founded in 1726. The buildings in the district are classified into three periods: 1750–1810, accounting for about 12% of the extent buildings; 1811–1870, accounting for the majority of buildings; and 1871–1899, accounting for about 25% of the buildings.

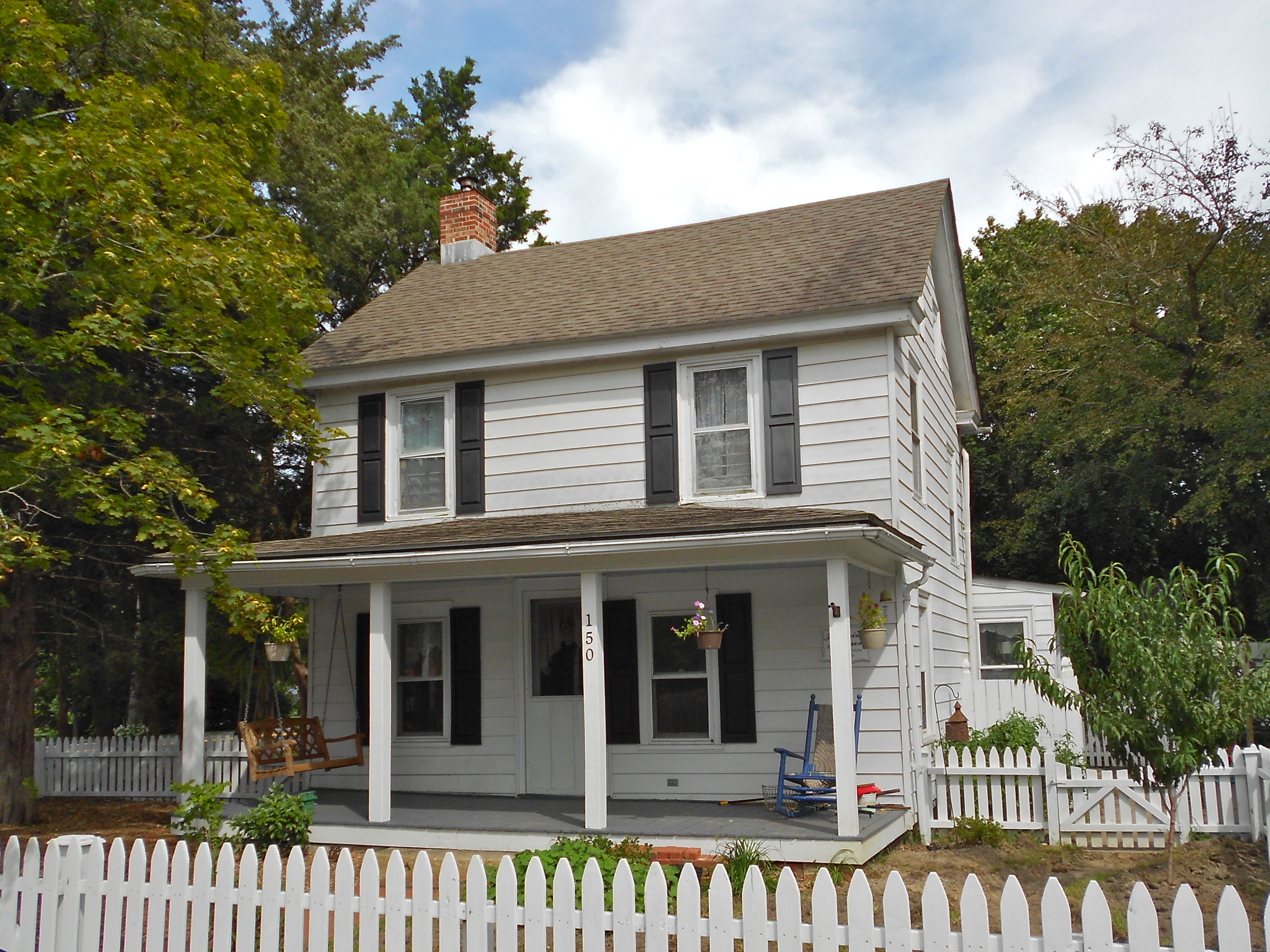
Johnson House, c. 1740

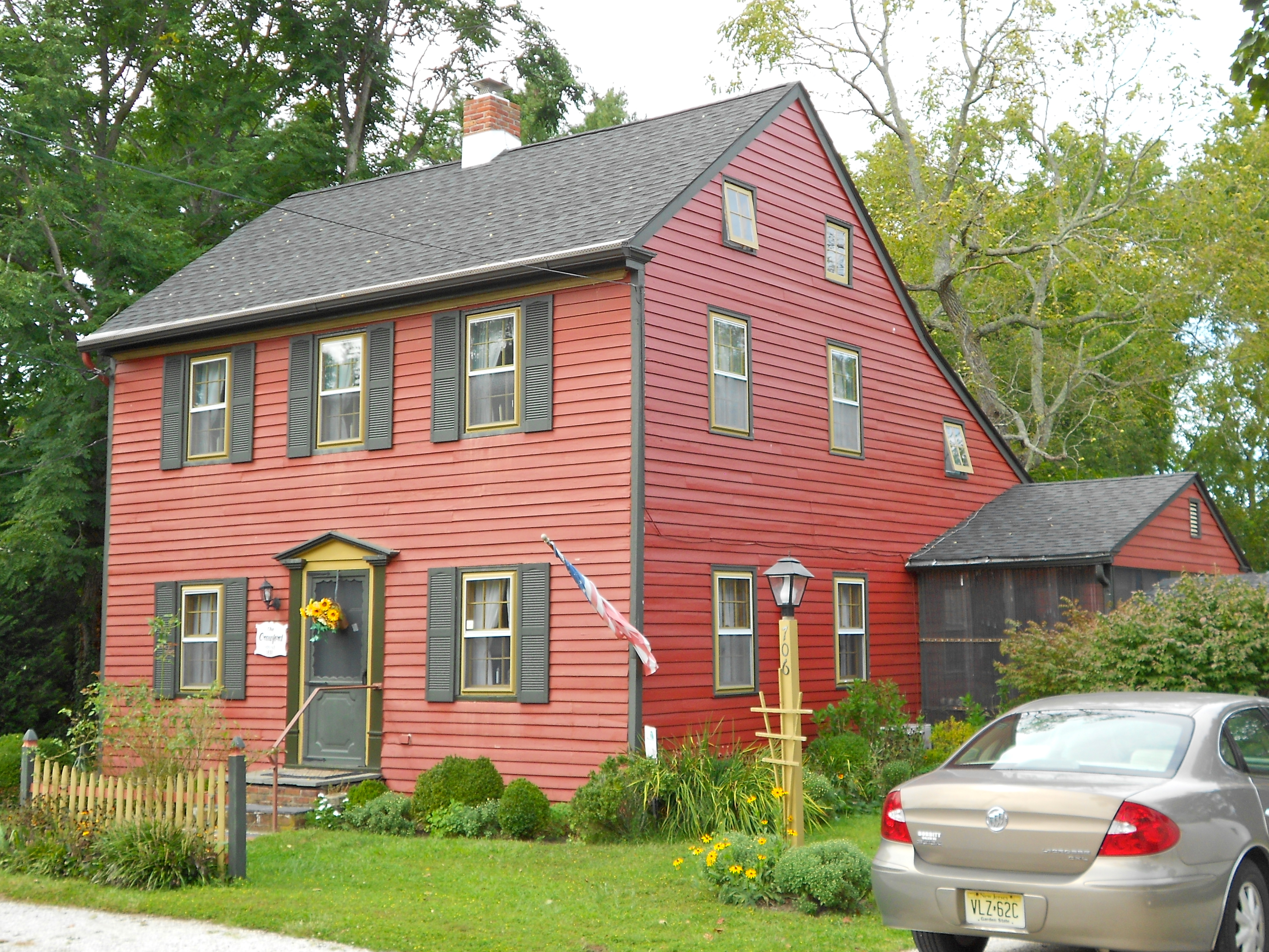
Crawford House, c. 1810

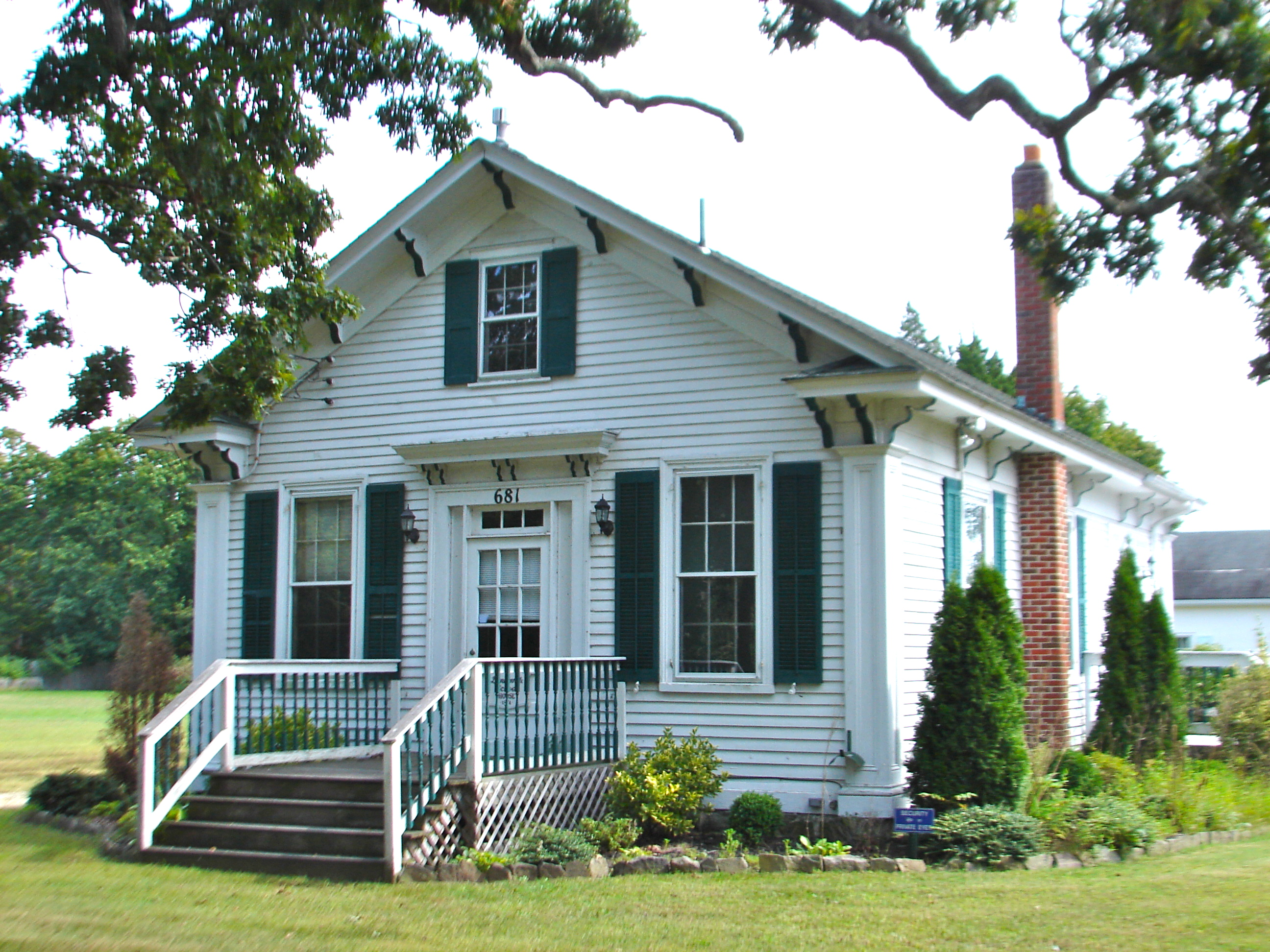
Schoolhouse, 1874

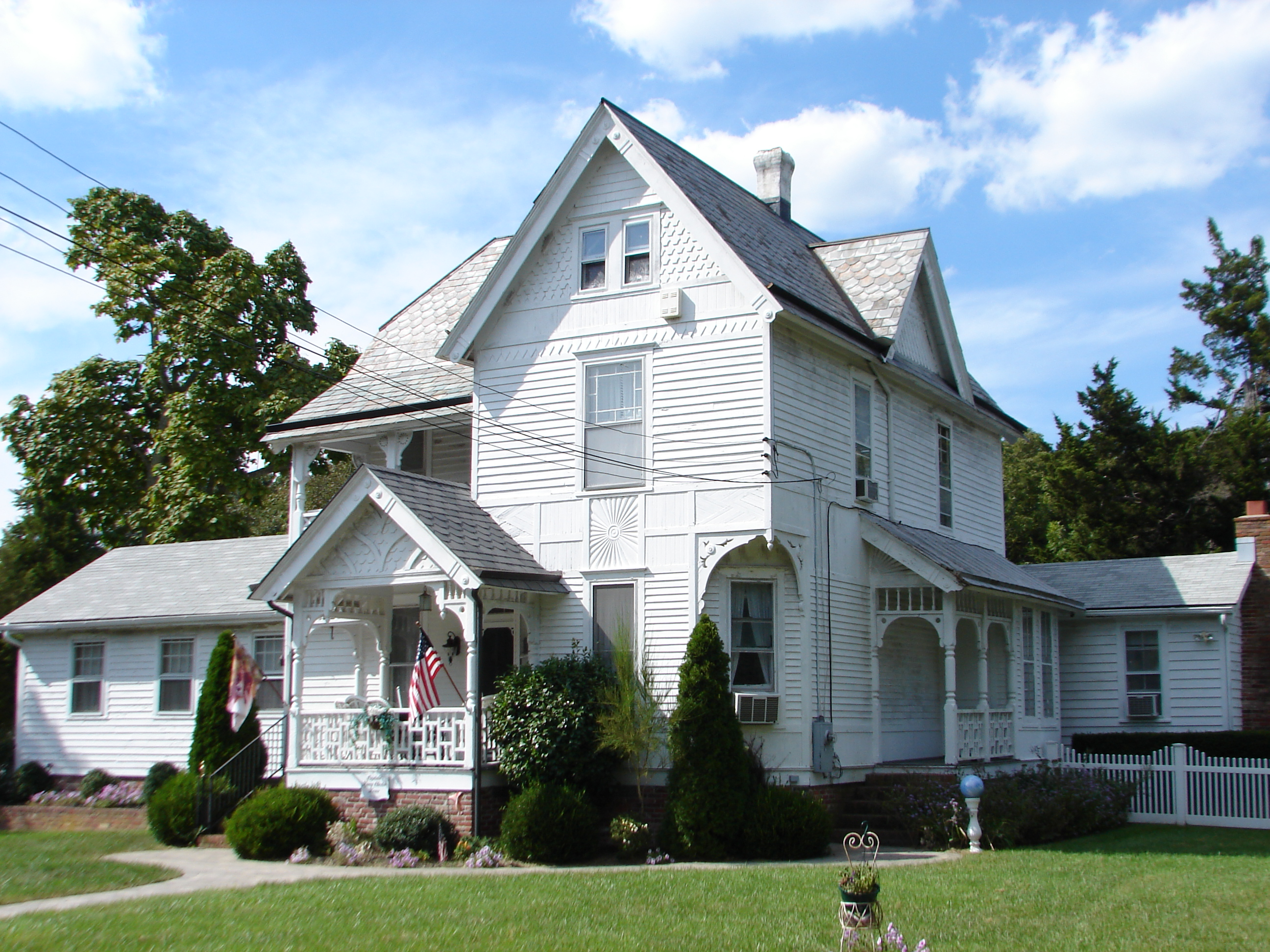
Chester House, 1898

== Education ==
As with other parts of Dennis Township, the area is zoned to Dennis Township Public Schools (for grades K-8) and Middle Township Public Schools (for high school). The latter operates Middle Township High School.

Countywide schools include Cape May County Technical High School and Cape May County Special Services School District.

== See also ==
- National Register of Historic Places listings in Cape May County, New Jersey
