= County Route 550 (New Jersey) =

Highway in New Jersey, United States

County Route 550
- CR 550 highlighted in red, CR 550 Spur in blue

Route information
- Length: 15.92 mi (25.62 km)
- Tourist routes: Pine Barrens Byway

Major junctions
- West end: Route 47 in Maurice River Township
- Route 347 in Maurice River Township; CR 550 Spur in Dennis Township; CR 557 in Woodbine
- East end: US 9 in Dennis Township

Location
- Country: United States
- State: New Jersey
- Counties: Cumberland, Cape May

Highway system
- County routes in New Jersey; 500-series routes
← CR 549	→ CR 551

County Route 550 (CR 550) is a county highway in the U.S. state of New Jersey. The highway extends 15.92 miles (25.62 km) from Delsea Drive (Route 47) in Maurice River Township to Shore Drive (U.S. Route 9) in Dennis Township. The road travels through Maurice River Township (Cumberland County), Dennis Township (Cape May County) and Woodbine.

== Route description ==
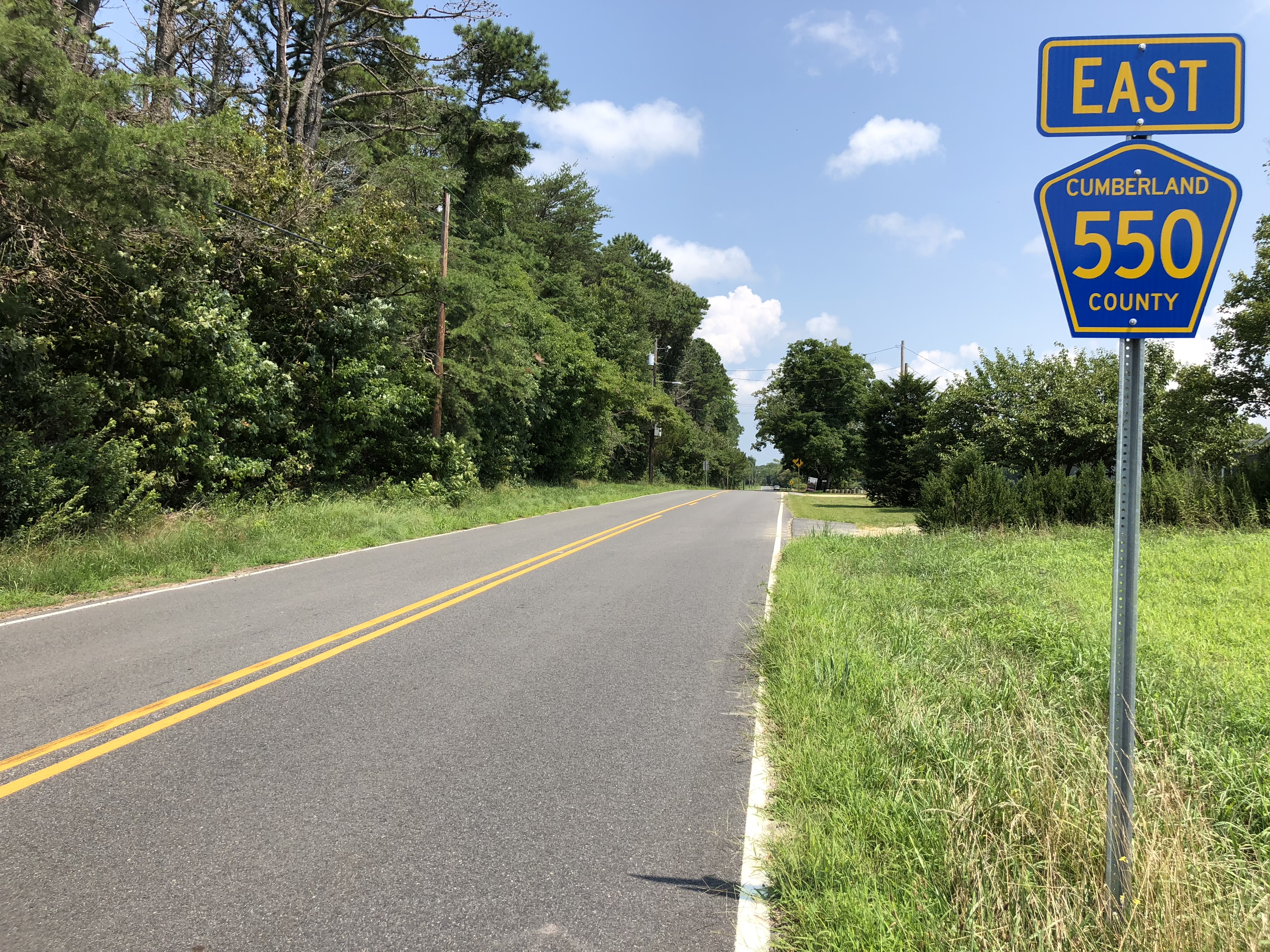
View east at the west end of CR 550 at Route 47 in Maurice River Township

CR 550 begins at an intersection with Route 47 in Maurice River Township, Cumberland County, heading east on two-lane undivided Leesburg-Belleplain Road. The road runs through dense woods with pockets of farms, crossing Route 347 before running through the Belleplain State Forest. CR 550 enters Dennis Township in Cape May County and becomes Hoffmans Mill Road. The road passes areas of farm fields and homes as it reaches the CR 550 Spur junction and makes a turn northeast onto Tuckahoe Road. A short distance later, the route turns southeast onto Webster Avenue, with CR 605 continuing north on Tuckahoe Road. CR 550 heads into heavy woodland again as it continues into Woodbine. In Woodbine, the route passes residences as it reaches the CR 557 intersection.

At this point, CR 550 turns northeast to form a concurrency with CR 557 on Washington Avenue while CR 638 continues east on Webster Avenue. The road passes a mix of homes and businesses as it comes to Dehirsch Avenue, where CR 550 splits from CR 557 by heading southeast on that road. CR 550 continues through developed areas, with the surroundings becoming more rural as the route intersects CR 660 and passes under the Cape May Seashore Lines railroad before passing north of Woodbine Municipal Airport. After meeting CR 610 at a roundabout, the road enters dense woodland and crosses back into Dennis Township, with the name becoming Woodbine-Ocean View Road. The route crosses CR 608 and CR 628, continuing into wooded residential areas at the intersection with the latter. CR 550 continues from this point to its eastern terminus at US 9.

== Major intersections ==
County	Location	mi	km	Destinations	Notes
Cumberland	Maurice River Township	0.00	0.00	Route 47 (Delsea Drive) – Wildwood, Millville	Western terminus
Cumberland	Maurice River Township	2.14	3.44	Route 347 (Cape Road) – Millville, Dennis	
Cape May	Dennis Township	5.37	8.64	CR 550 Spur west (Eldora Road) – Eldora	
Cape May	Woodbine	9.18	14.77	CR 557 south (Washington Avenue) – Dennisville	West end of CR 557 overlap
Cape May	Woodbine	9.59	15.43	CR 557 north to Route 55 – Tuckahoe	East end of CR 557 overlap
Cape May	Dennis Township	15.92	25.62	US 9 (Shore Road) to G.S. Parkway – Sea Isle City	Eastern terminus
1.000 mi = 1.609 km; 1.000 km = 0.621 mi: Concurrency terminus

== CR 550 Spur ==
County Route 550 Spur
- Location: Dennis Township and Maurice River Township
- Length: 4.84 mi (7.79 km)

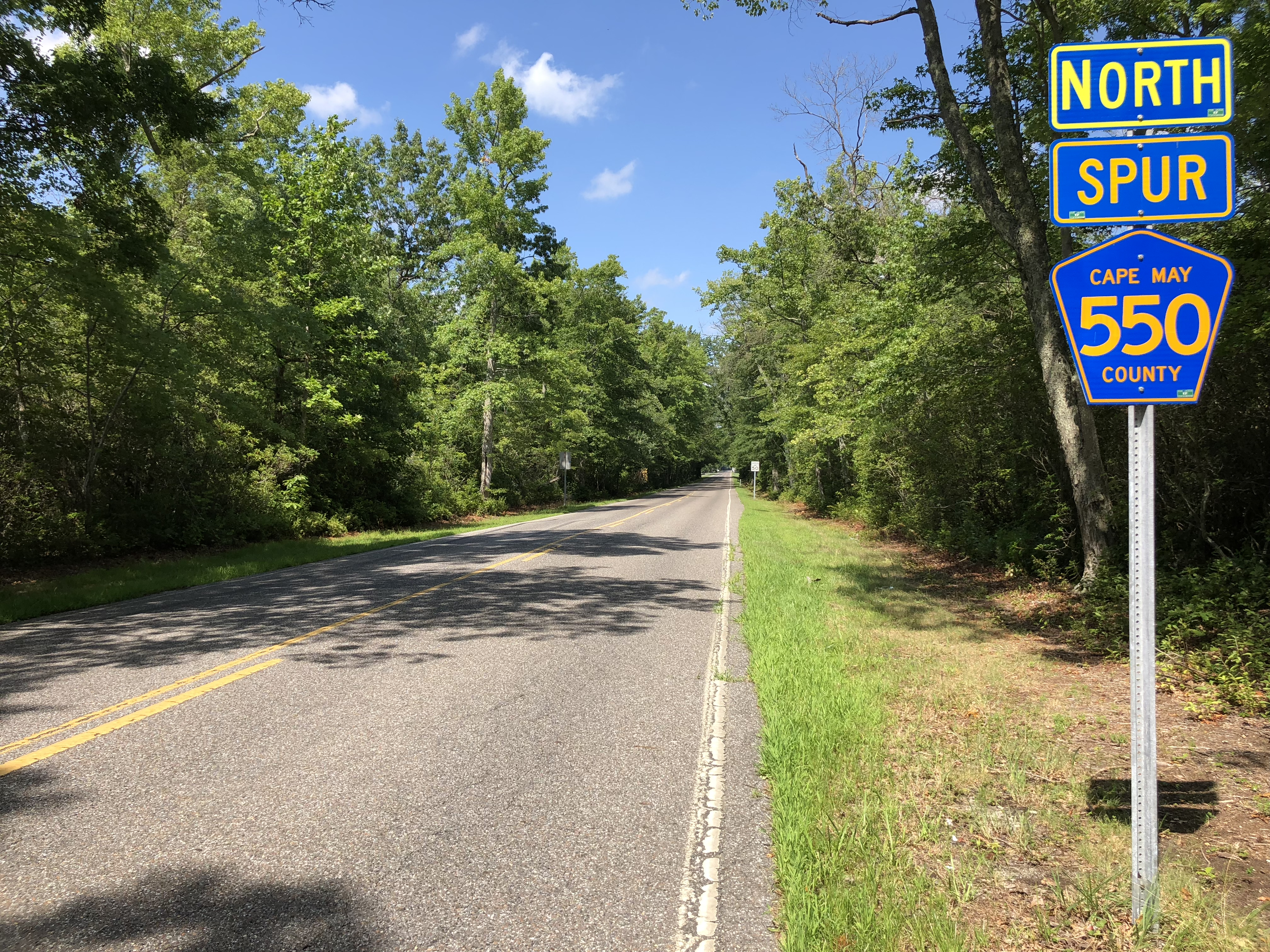
CR 550 Spur eastbound entering Cape May County past the Route 347 intersection

County Route 550 Spur, abbreviated CR 550 Spur, is a county highway in the U.S. state of New Jersey. The highway extends 4.84 miles (7.79 km) from Delsea Drive (Route 47) to Hoffman's Mill Road (CR 550) in Dennis Township. Between the two termini, the route passes through a portion of Maurice River Township.

The road travels through the following municipalities (from west to east):

- Dennis Township (Cape May County)
- Maurice River Township (Cumberland County)

Major intersections

County	Location	mi	km	Destinations	Notes
Cape May	Dennis Township	0.00	0.00	Route 47 (Delsea Drive)	Western terminus
Cumberland	Maurice River Township	2.48	3.99	Route 347 north	West end of Route 347 overlap
Cumberland	Maurice River Township	2.60	4.18	Route 347 south	East end of Route 347 overlap
Cape May	Dennis Township	4.84	7.79	CR 550 (Hoffman Mill Road)	Eastern terminus
1.000 mi = 1.609 km; 1.000 km = 0.621 mi: Concurrency terminus
