= Effects of Hurricane Irene in New Jersey =

Hurricane Irene
- Tropical Storm Irene over the Mid-Atlantic on August 28

Tropical storm
- 1-minute sustained (SSHWS/NWS)
- Highest winds: 70 mph (110 km/h)
- Lowest pressure: 959 mbar (hPa); 28.32 inHg

Overall effects
- Fatalities: 7 direct
- Damage: $1 billion (2011 USD)
- Areas affected: New Jersey
- Part of the 2011 Atlantic hurricane season

The effects of Hurricane Irene in New Jersey in 2011 included about $1 billion in damage to 200,000 homes and buildings. This made it the costliest disaster in the state's history, though this was dwarfed by Hurricane Sandy the following year. Irene struck the state on August 28, and was initially reported to be the first hurricane to hit New Jersey since 1903; however, post-analysis downgraded Irene to a tropical storm at its landfall in the Little Egg Inlet.

== Preparations ==
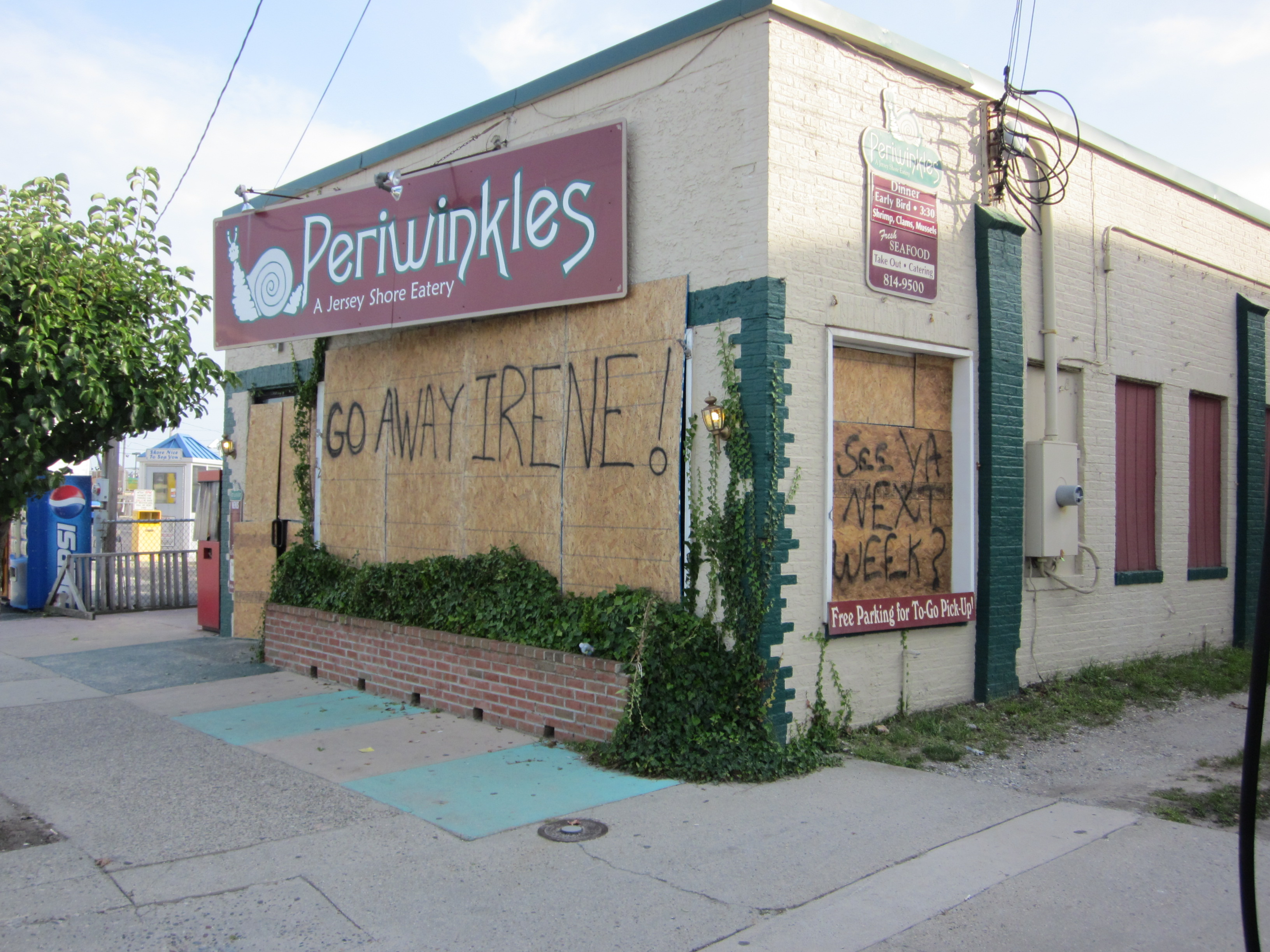
A restaurant boards up in preparation for Irene in Ocean City, New Jersey

As early as August 23, the National Hurricane Center (NHC) predicted that Hurricane Irene – then located over The Bahamas as a major hurricane – would be near New Jersey within five days as the storm moved around the subtropical ridge. On August 25, the NHC predicted Irene would be over New Jersey within three days. Accordingly, the agency issued a hurricane watch for the East Coast of the United States from the North Carolina/Virginia border to Sandy Hook in New Jersey. A day later, this was upgraded to a hurricane warning, including the northernmost portion of the coastline to the New York border. Hurricane warnings ultimately covered 11 counties, with tropical storm warnings in another six counties.

Governor Chris Christie declared a state of emergency on August 25, with President Obama reaffirming the declaration by August 27. New Jersey Transit rail, bus and light rail operations were suspended for Saturday, August 27, and Sunday, August 28. That same day, the Port Authority of New York and New Jersey suspended incoming flights at the five metropolitan airports under its jurisdiction and the on Port Authority Trans Hudson (PATH) rapid transit system. The Public Service Enterprise Group (PSE&G) opted to dispatch roughly 6,000 workers in case of power outages, with 840 lineman and 540 tree contractors.

In Cape May County, New Jersey, OEM Director Frank McCall ordered a mandatory evacuation of barrier islands effective on Thursday Aug 25 and all residents from the county Friday at 8 a.m. All Atlantic County shore communities east of US 9—including Brigantine, Ventnor, Margate and Longport—were placed under a voluntary evacuation at 8 p.m. August 25, and the following day a mandatory evacuation effective starting 6 a.m. All Atlantic City casino resorts shut down on August 26, as the city faced the first mandatory evacuation in history; the city only underwent a partial evacuation during Hurricane Gloria in 1985. At an August 27, afternoon press conference, Christie stated that 90 percent of Cape May County residents had evacuated and announced plans to send buses to the Atlantic City region to urge remaining residents to leave the area. At the same press conference, Christie stated that 1,500 National Guard troops had been deployed in New Jersey.

In Ocean County, all of Long Beach Island was under mandatory evacuation starting at 8:00 a.m. on August 26, while evacuations of the Barnegat Peninsula barrier island to the north were simultaneously underway. To relieve evacuation traffic, toll operations were temporarily suspended on the Garden State Parkway south of the Raritan River and on the Atlantic City Expressway. The southbound lanes on the Garden State Parkway south of exit 98 were closed at 8 p.m. on August 26, while east–west bridges and arteries such as Route 70 and Route 72 would be closed to eastbound traffic. That same day, traffic on Route 55 south of Vineland, Route 47 and Route 347 was only allowed to head north.

Residents of low-lying areas of Hudson County along the Hudson River and Upper New York Bay were advised to evacuate. In some areas, evacuation was mandatory for residents of ground-floor apartments. At MetLife Stadium, a preseason football game between the New York Giants and New York Jets was postponed until August 29. A Major League Soccer game between the New York Red Bulls and Los Angeles Galaxy was postponed until October 4. Newark Liberty International Airport was closed on August 27 in preparation for the storm.

Meteorologists noted the potential of up to 16 in (410 mm) of rain in some New Jersey locations. The Ramapo River floodgates were opened in an attempt to reduce flooding associated with the possible overflow of the river.

== Impact ==
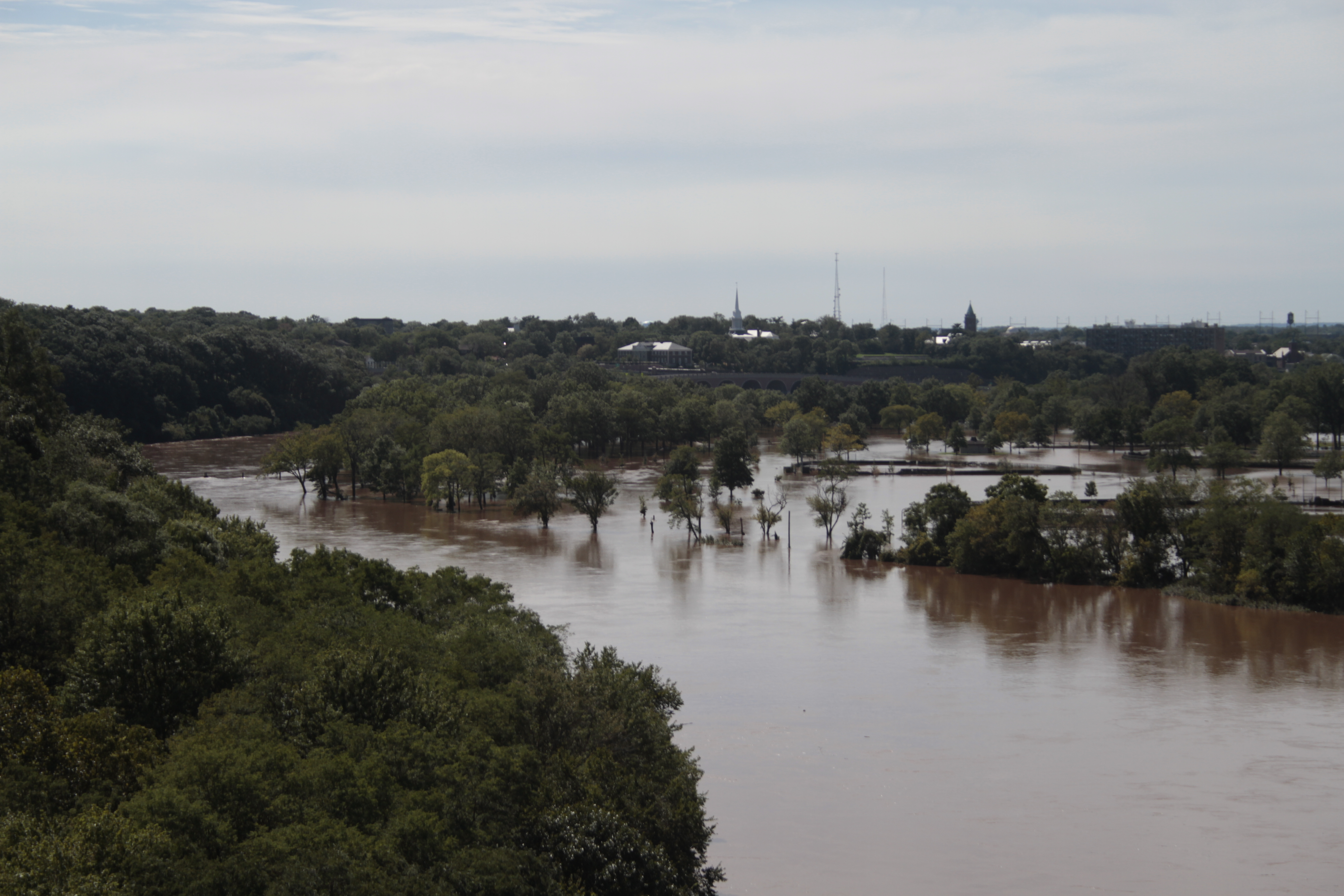
The Raritan River at New Brunswick on August 29, 2011, one day after Hurricane Irene landfall

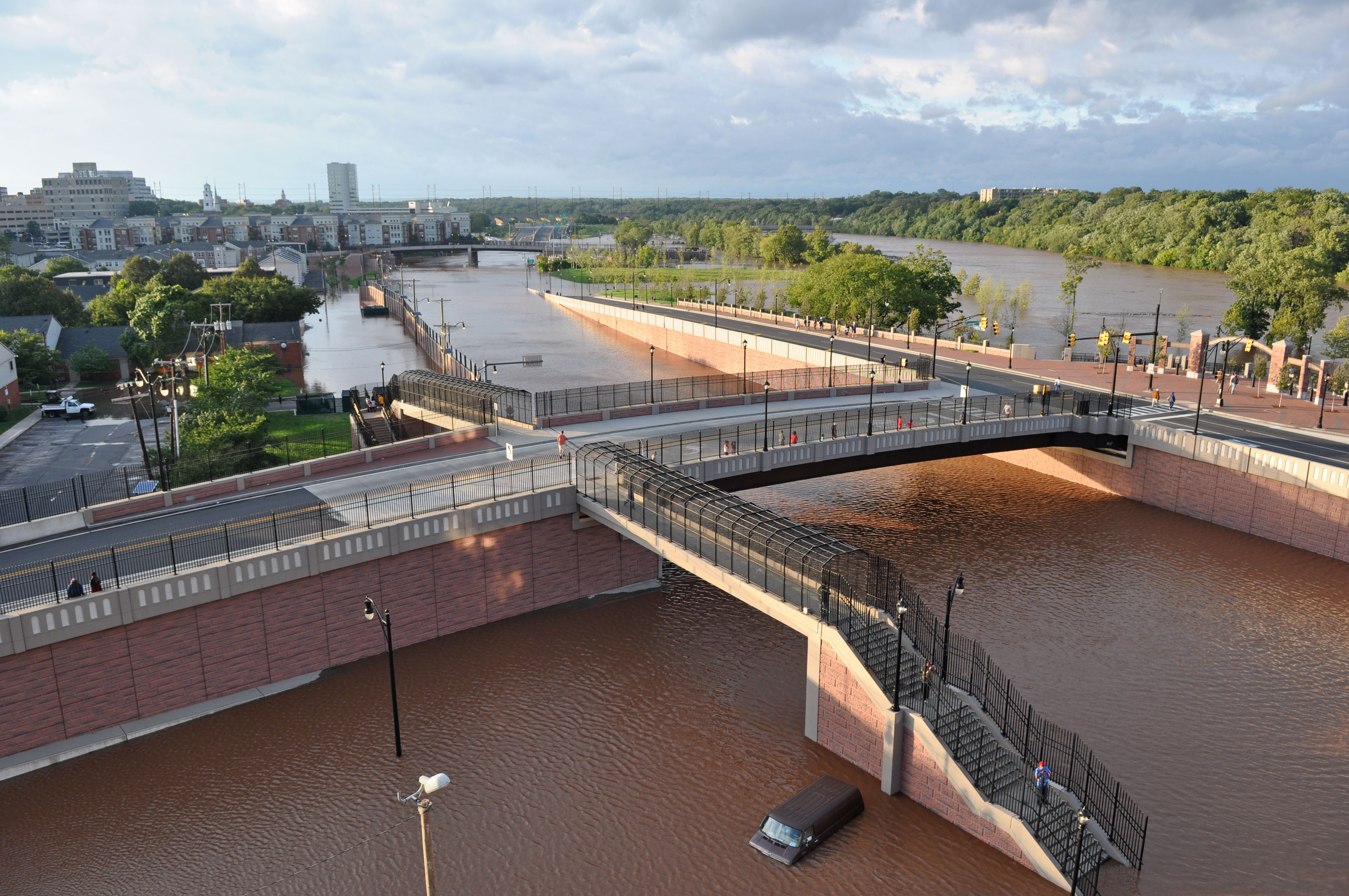
Photograph of Route 18 flooded by the Raritan River in New Brunswick, NJ depicting the flooding damage from Hurricane Irene.

On August 28, the center of Irene moved ashore New Jersey on Brigantine Island. In real-time, the NHC assessed Irene as a hurricane with 75 mph (121 km/h) maximum sustained winds at landfall. This would have made Irene the first storm of hurricane intensity to strike New Jersey since 1903; however, the NHC downgraded the landfall intensity to 70 mph (110 km/h), with the strongest winds located over water, east of the center. About seven hours after Irene made landfall, the Cape May–Lewes Ferry terminal in North Cape May recorded a wind gust of 75 mph (121 km/h), the highest winds in the state. Gale-force gusts affected most of the state. Harvey Cedars and Tuckerton recorded gusts of 69 mph (111 km/h). In addition to the winds, Irene dropped heavy rainfall in New Jersey, reaching 10.32 in (262 mm) in Stockton in Hunterdon County. The landfalling storm also increased water levels along both the Atlantic coast and along the Delaware Valley. Sandy Hook reported a storm surge of 4.63 ft (1.41 m), which was 9.75 ft (2.97 m) above mean low water (MLW). At Burlington along the Delaware River reported a storm surge of 3.42 ft (1.04 m), which was 11.34 ft (3.46 m) above MLW.

North Jersey, and Central Jersey where flooding was widespread, experienced significant damage. While the storm made landfall next to Galloway and Little Egg Harbor on the southern Jersey shore, South Jersey received little damage and flooding. Floods in Cumberland County were the extent of the damage in the southern part of the state, particularly in Bridgeton, which received damage to infrastructure in a storm a week earlier. Severe river flooding occurred, including Raritan, Millstone, Rockaway, Rahway, Delaware and Passaic due to record rainfall. Highest rainfall recorded in the state was in Freehold (11.27 inches (286 mm)), followed by Jefferson (10.54 inches (268 mm)) and Wayne (10 inches (250 mm)). Record flows were reported at the Musconetcong River in the rural northwest. Eleven reached record levels, and a week after the storm all rivers in the state remained at "moderate flooding level". The flooding affected roads, including the heavily used I-287 in Boonton where the northbound shoulder collapsed from the force of the Rockaway River, and Garden State Parkway which flooded in Cranford from the Rahway River and in Toms River near exit 98. Along the Hudson River, in parts of Jersey City and Hoboken flood waters rose as much as 5 feet. and the north tube of the Holland Tunnel was briefly closed. Floods from Irene contributed to 2011 being the wettest August on record for New Jersey.

At the Trenton Train Station along Assunpink Creek, flooding impacted Amtrak's Northeast Corridor, SEPTA's Trenton Line, and New Jersey Transit's (NJT) Northeast Corridor Rail Line. Engineers reported that the service disruption could last a week. Service was restored to and through Trenton on August 31, barring a few exceptions. According to Executive Director Jim Weinstein Irene cost NJT just under $10 million in lost revenue and damaged infrastructure. The agency was criticized for the system being closed the entire day after the storm. In total, ten deaths within the state are attributable to the storm. A medical rescue squad worker was swept away in flood waters and was pulled from the water early Sunday in Princeton, but did not survive.

In addition to major flooding, the combination of already heavily saturated ground from a wet summer, and heavy wind gusts made New Jersey especially vulnerable to wind damage. An EF0 tornado also knocked down trees and power poles in Robbinsville Township. One of the hardest hit areas due to high winds was Union County in Central Jersey. Fallen trees, many pushed from the soaked ground with their roots attached, blocked vital roads from being accessed by local emergency services. This was not isolated to local streets, but also parts of vital arteries Route 28 and US 22. Numerous homes suffered structural damages from the winds, and limbs impacting their roofs. Perhaps the most critical damage however due to wind was fallen wires. Around Union County, fallen wires in combination with flooded electrical substations left parts of Union County, including Cranford, Garwood, and Westfield without power or phone service for nearly a week. Many areas with a high number of downed wires did not lose power, as wires on the ground remained live. This includes one documented case in Roselle Park where a 13kV (13,000 volt) primary power line remained down, tangled in trees for four days due to the lack of available PSE&G crews.

In total, approximately 1.46 million customers of JCP&L and PSEG throughout most of the 21 counties lost power. Two days after the storm, 500,000 PSEG customers were still without power, down from a peak of about 928,000 on August 28. By September 3 power had been restored to all but 750, but thousands of JCPL customers were still without service. On September 2, 37,000 JCPL customers were awaiting restoration of service. On Sunday September 5, power had been returned to last remaining 2,000 residents who suffered a power outage. The slow response by JCPL has prompted an investigation by the state's Public Utilities Board. During hearings Kim Guadagno criticized the company's lack of communication in keeping the public informed about the utility's storm response.

== Aftermath ==
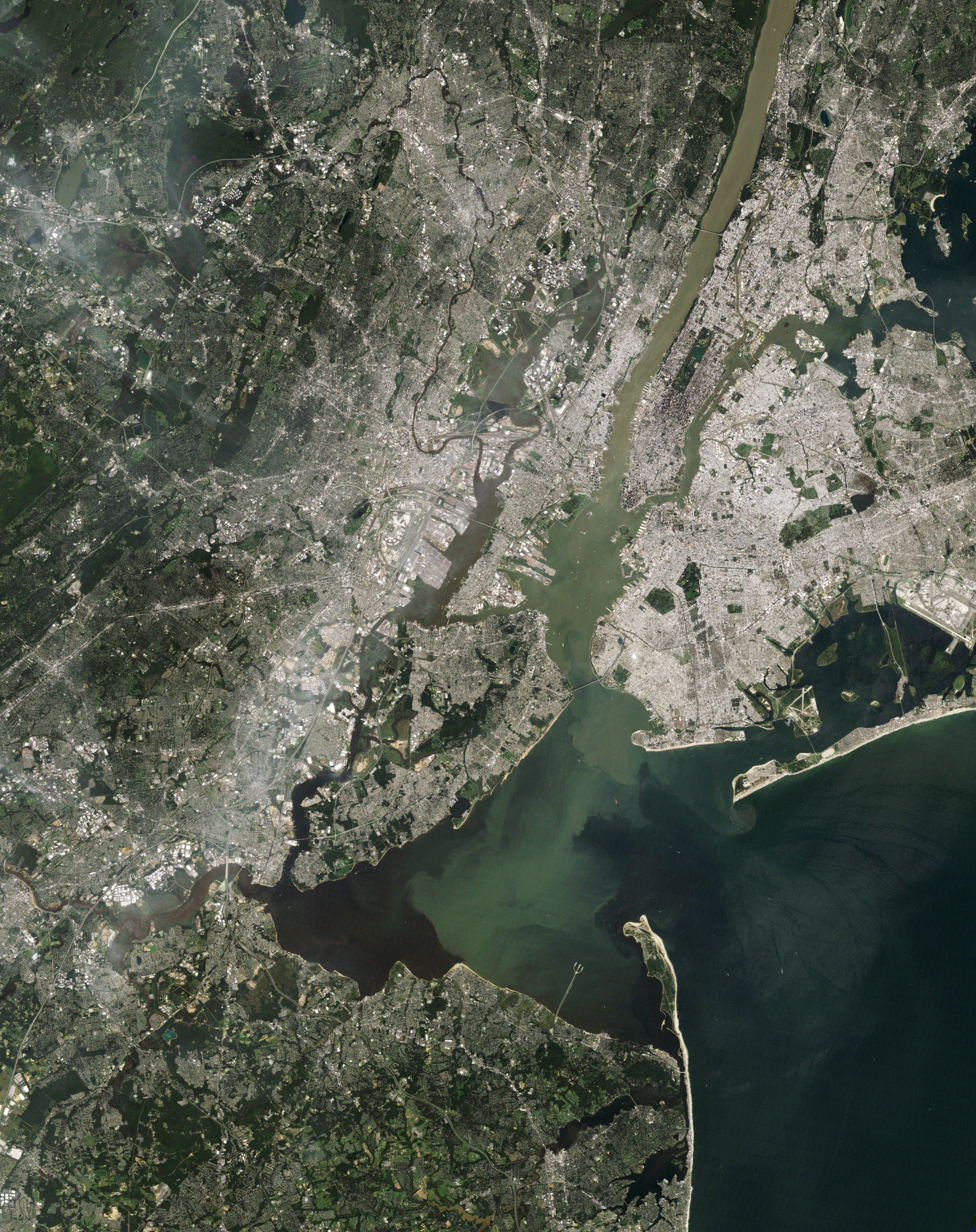
Satellite image of sediment from Irene in the Hudson River estuary in New York City and northeastern New Jersey

Flooding in some parts of the state continued for another three days. On August 29, the state governor asked President Obama to expedite release of emergency funds to the state. The President was scheduled to tour Paterson on September 4 to view damage to the area. The city, on August 31, still counted 6,000 displaced persons; three of four bridges crossing the Passaic remained closed. Touring the state on August 31 with FEMA Administrator Craig Fugate, U.S. Homeland Security Secretary Janet Napolitano declared "This is as bad as I've seen, and I've been in eight states that have been impacted by Irene." The president the same day declared the state a disaster area, making residents of Bergen, Essex, Morris, Passaic and Somerset counties eligible for federal aid. Politicians and residents in other counties claimed inconsistency in the designations, and the area was later expanded to 16 counties. Soon after the president's visit, the declaration was extended even further, making all 21 counties eligible for FEMA aid. Obama vowed aid would be void of politics.

More than 31,000 residents filed assistance claims through FEMA, and within two weeks nearly $38 million had been disbursed with others pending. Hardest-hit counties were Bergen and Passaic in the northeast, each with more than 4,000 claims. Prior funding will be used to purchase homes in flood-prone areas, notably at Lost Valley section of Manville on the Raritan River While the deadline for applications for disaster relief was set as October 31, as of September 28 more than 54,000 residents had shared in the $116 million which had been distributed.

In December 2011, it was announced that eight municipalities devastated by the hurricane would receive more than $28 million from the FEMA's Hazard Mitigation Grant Program. Wayne, on the Passaic River, will receive the most funding from the voluntary program — $6.3 million to buy approximately 56 homes. Pompton Lakes, Little Falls, Lincoln Park, Fairfield Township and Pequannock Township would each receive between $2.9 million and $4.1 million to buy out between 10 and 20 homes, Middlesex Borough would receive $1.9 million to purchase about seven homes. The homes would be d, reemolishedturning the land to the floodplain and preserved as green space. In January 2012, the governor signed a bill introduced by the New Jersey Legislature in November 2011 allowing the use of state's open space funding for the purchase of homes in flood-prone areas.

Despite the mandatory evacuations ordered for many parts of the Jersey Shore, the damage and flooding in that area of the state was not as severe as predicted. This miscalculation was met with frustration among many coastal residents that were evacuated out of an abundance of caution. A year later when evacuations were ordered for Hurricane Sandy, some residents along the predicted path in New Jersey and New York were reluctant or skeptical about the storm's potential and their preparations were more lax or evacuation orders were ignored. This proved very damaging for some as Hurricane Sandy was far worse than predicted.

== See also ==
- List of New Jersey hurricanes
- Hurricane Sandy
- Hurricane Floyd
- Hurricane Gloria
- Hurricane Donna
