= South Seaville, New Jersey =

Populated place in Cape May County, New Jersey, US

- Unincorporated community
- Location in Cape May County Location in New Jersey Location in the United States
- Coordinates: 39°10′44″N 74°45′36″W
- Country: United States
- State: New Jersey
- County: Cape May
- Township: Dennis

Area
  - Total: 2.39 sq mi (6.19 km^{2})
  - Land: 2.38 sq mi (6.17 km^{2})
  - Water: 0.0077 sq mi (0.02 km^{2})
- Elevation: 23 ft (7.0 m)

Population (2020)
  - Total: 695
  - Density: 291.8/sq mi (112.65/km^{2})
- Time zone: UTC−05:00 (Eastern (EST))
  - Summer (DST): UTC−04:00 (EDT)
- ZIP Code: 08246
- Area codes: 609, 640
- FIPS code: 34-28380
- GNIS feature ID: 880754

South Seaville is an unincorporated community located within Dennis Township in Cape May County, in the U.S. state of New Jersey. South Seaville is 4 miles (6.4 km) northwest of Sea Isle City. South Seaville has a post office with ZIP Code 08246.

As of the 2020 census, South Seaville had a population of 695.

A post office was established in 1867, with Remington Corson as the first postmaster.

== Demographics ==
Historical population
| Census | Pop. | Note | %± |
|---|---|---|---|
| 2020 | 695 | | — |
U.S. Decennial Census

South Seaville was first listed as a census designated place in the 2020 U.S. census.

South Seaville CDP, New Jersey – Racial and ethnic composition Note: the US Census treats Hispanic/Latino as an ethnic category. This table excludes Latinos from the racial categories and assigns them to a separate category. Hispanics/Latinos may be of any race.
| Race / Ethnicity (NH = Non-Hispanic) | Pop 2020 | 2020 |
|---|---|---|
| White alone (NH) | 637 | 91.65% |
| Black or African American alone (NH) | 4 | 0.58% |
| Native American or Alaska Native alone (NH) | 0 | 0.00% |
| Asian alone (NH) | 4 | 0.58% |
| Native Hawaiian or Pacific Islander alone (NH) | 0 | 0.00% |
| Other race alone (NH) | 3 | 0.43% |
| Mixed race or Multiracial (NH) | 19 | 2.73% |
| Hispanic or Latino (any race) | 28 | 4.03% |
| Total | 695 | 100.00% |

== Education ==
As with other parts of Dennis Township, the area is zoned to Dennis Township Public Schools (for grades K-8) and Middle Township Public Schools (for high school). The latter operates Middle Township High School.

Countywide schools include Cape May County Technical High School and Cape May County Special Services School District.
