= Jonathan Maslow =

American journalist

Jonathan Evan Maslow (August 4, 1948 – February 19, 2008) was an American journalist and author who wrote extensively about nature, with a focus on obscure and little-known animals.

== Early life ==
Maslow was born on August 4, 1948, in Long Branch, New Jersey. He graduated from Red Bank Regional High School in 1966 and has an annual college scholarship funded by members of his graduating class that is awarded in his memory to a graduate of the school attending college. He graduated from Marlboro College in 1971 with a major in American literature and graduated from the Columbia University Graduate School of Journalism in 1974 with a degree in journalism.

== Published works ==
His published works included The Owl Papers, a 1983 book illustrated by Leonard Baskin (a cousin of Maslow's) about his search for a short-eared owl in the New Jersey Meadowlands. Perpetuating his theme of tracing unusual animals, his 1986 book, Bird of Life, Bird of Death: A Naturalist’s Journey Through a Land of Political Turmoil, or A Political Ornithology of Central America, followed the quetzal bird in Guatemala, while Sacred Horses: The Memoirs of a Turkmen Cowboy, published in 1994, followed the Akhal-Teke horse in present-day Turkmenistan. He also worked as a journalist at the Cape May County Herald from 1997 to 2002 and then as an editor at the Herald News of Passaic County, NJ. Maslow was honored in 2001 by the New Jersey Press Association for "Towers in Service - The $14M Question," a piece he wrote for the Cape May County Herald Times. He wrote The Last Lector, a play based on a story from his 1996 book The Torrid Zone; Seven Stories From the Gulf Coast.

== Film and television ==
Maslow hosted an episode of the BBC's Natural World series in 1989, taking viewers on a journey through the Darién Gap in the production entitled "A Tramp in the Darien."

== Personal life ==
A resident of the Dennisville section of Dennis Township, New Jersey and the Passaic Park neighborhood of Passaic, Maslow died of cancer at the age of 59 on February 19, 2008, in Greenwich, Connecticut. He was survived by his third wife, Liliya Khobotkova.
