= Jarrett Porter =

American tenor (born 1993)

- Born: Jarrett Porter; April 30, 1993 (age 33); Philadelphia, Pennsylvania, U.S.
- Occupation: Classical Baritone

Jarrett Porter (born 1993) is an American baritone known for his performances as an opera and lieder singer.

== Early life and education ==
Porter was born in Philadelphia, Pennsylvania, and raised in the Dennisville section of Dennis Township, New Jersey. He attended the Eastman School of Music, where he received a Bachelor of Music degree, and San Francisco Conservatory of Music, where he received a Master of Music degree as a James Schwabacher Fellow. Porter also received further instruction at the Marion Roose Pullin Studio at Arizona Opera, and in the apprentice programs of Santa Fe Opera, The Glimmerglass Festival, and Opera Saratoga.

== Career ==
At Arizona Opera, Porter performed as Guglielmo in Mozart's Così fan tutte, Father Palmer in Silent Night by Kevin Puts, Baron Douphol in Verdi's La Traviata, Maximilian in Bernstein's Candide, Sciarrone in Puccini's Tosca, and Fiorello in Rossini's The Barber of Seville. In 2018, Porter joined the Santa Fe Opera, where he appeared as the in Ariadne auf Naxos by R. Strauss, and the Sergeant in Puccini's La bohème. In the 2019/20 season, he first performed at Tulsa Opera as Dancaïre in Bizet's Carmen, and joined Renée Fleming and the Santa Fe Opera Orchestra as a soloist in Vaughan Williams's Serenade to Music.

In 2020, Porter joined The Juilliard School as a candidate for an artist diploma in opera studies. He created the role of Neil Armstrong of Steven Mackey’s Moon Tea at the Opera Theatre of St. Louis. Porter most recently sang the role of Oliver Sacks in the world premiere of Tobias Picker's Awakenings at the Opera Theatre of St. Louis in 2022.

== Awards ==
Porter has been a grant recipient of the 2021 Gerda Lissner Song Competition, winner of The Sullivan Foundation (2019), winner of the 2021 and 2019 District rounds of the Metropolitan Opera National Council, the Ellie Silver Award winner at the 2018 Holt Competition, and the 2017 Grand Prize Winner of the Pacific Music Society Competition.
