= Dennisville, New Jersey =

Populated place in Cape May County, New Jersey, US

- Census-designated place
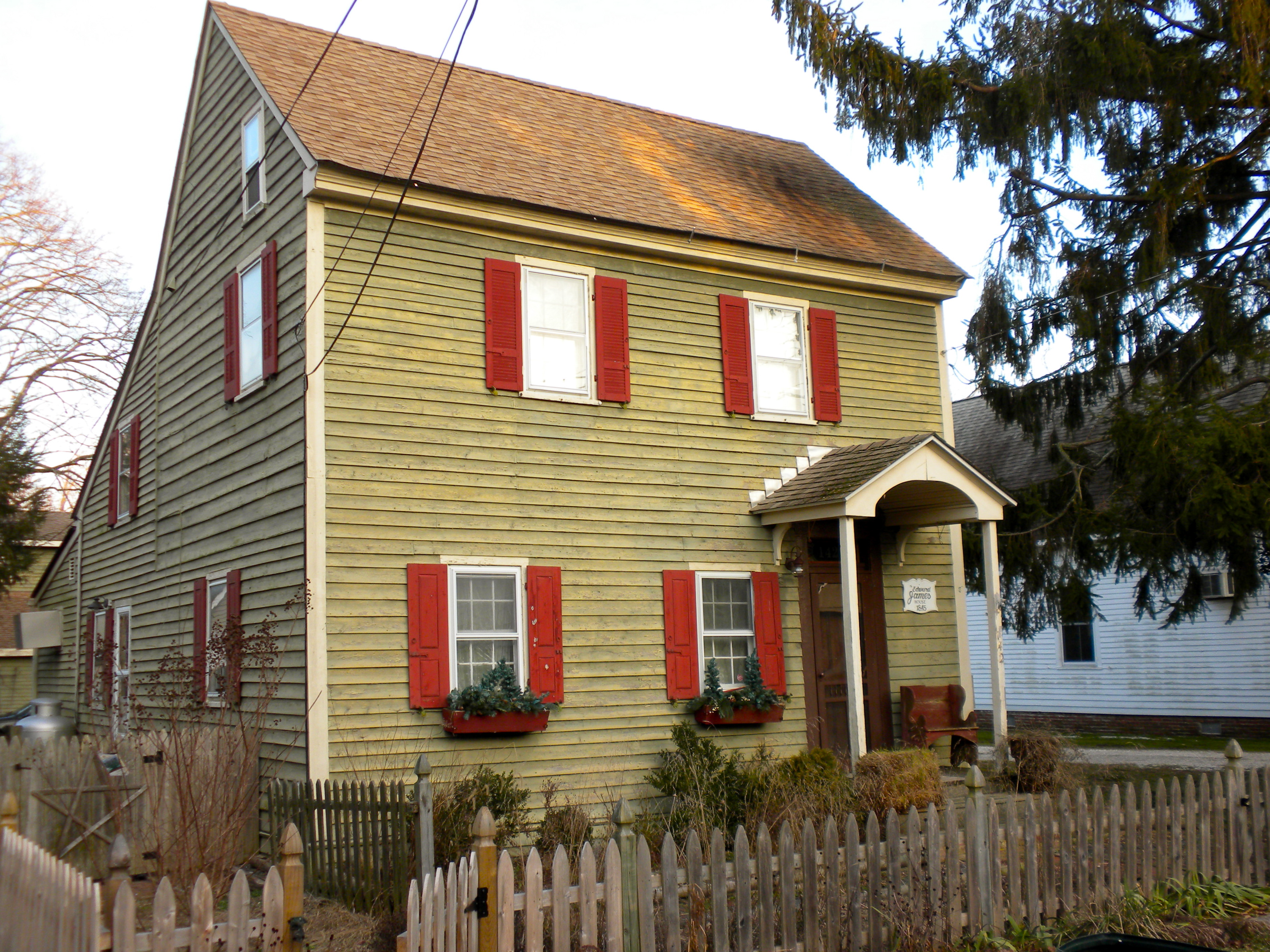
- James House in Dennisville Historic District

- Location in Cape May County Location in New Jersey Location in the United States
- Coordinates: 39°11′35″N 74°49′31″W
- Country: United States
- State: New Jersey
- County: Cape May
- Township: Dennis

Area
  - Total: 4.58 sq mi (11.86 km^{2})
  - Land: 4.40 sq mi (11.39 km^{2})
  - Water: 0.18 sq mi (0.47 km^{2})
- Elevation: 6.6 ft (2 m)

Population (2020)
  - Total: 830
  - Density: 188.8/sq mi (72.88/km^{2})
- ZIP Code: 08214
- Area codes: 609, 640
- FIPS code: 34-17590
- GNIS feature ID: 0875895

Dennisville is an unincorporated community and census-designated place (CDP) located within Dennis Township, in Cape May County, in the U.S. state of New Jersey. It is part of the Ocean City Metropolitan Statistical Area. Its postal ZIP Code is 08214. As of the 2020 census, Dennisville had a population of 830.

Dennisville is on the south side of Dennis Creek and is the most important community within Dennis Township. The main transportation artery is New Jersey Route 47 (Delsea Drive).

== Demographics ==
Historical population
Census	Pop.	Note	%±
2020	830		—
U.S. 2020 Decennial Census

Dennisville first appeared as a census designated place in the 2020 U.S. census.

Dennisville CDP, New Jersey – Racial and ethnic composition Note: the US Census treats Hispanic/Latino as an ethnic category. This table excludes Latinos from the racial categories and assigns them to a separate category. Hispanics/Latinos may be of any race.
Race / Ethnicity (NH = Non-Hispanic)	Pop 2020	2020
White alone (NH)	758	91.33%
Black or African American alone (NH)	3	0.36%
Native American or Alaska Native alone (NH)	0	0.00%
Asian alone (NH)	4	0.48%
Native Hawaiian or Pacific Islander alone (NH)	0	0.00%
Other race alone (NH)	1	0.12%
Mixed race or Multiracial (NH)	49	5.90%
Hispanic or Latino (any race)	15	1.81%
Total	830	100.00%

As of 2020, the population of the area was 830.

== History ==
Dennisville was founded in 1726 by Anthony Ludlam. The first post office in the area was Dennis Creek, established September 7, 1802, with Jeremiah Johnson as first postmaster. The name was changed to Dennisville in 1854.

In the 1880s, a local industry sprung up—described by The New York Times as "the like of which does not exist anywhere else in the world"—in which cedar trees that had fallen as much as decades earlier were recovered from under the surface of local swamps. The trees, ranging in size from 4 to 6 feet (1.2 to 1.8 m) in diameter, were first discovered in 1812 and became the foundation of a thriving economic boom in the area for shingles and staves.

== Education ==
As with other parts of Dennis Township, the area is zoned to Dennis Township Public Schools (for grades K-8) and Middle Township Public Schools (for high school). The latter operates Middle Township High School.

Countywide schools include Cape May County Technical High School and Cape May County Special Services School District.

== Notable people ==
People who were born in, residents of, or otherwise closely associated with Dennisville include:

- Jonathan Maslow (1948-2008), author who wrote extensively about nature, with a focus on obscure and little understood animals.
- Jarrett Porter (born 1993), baritone known for his performances as an opera and lieder singer.
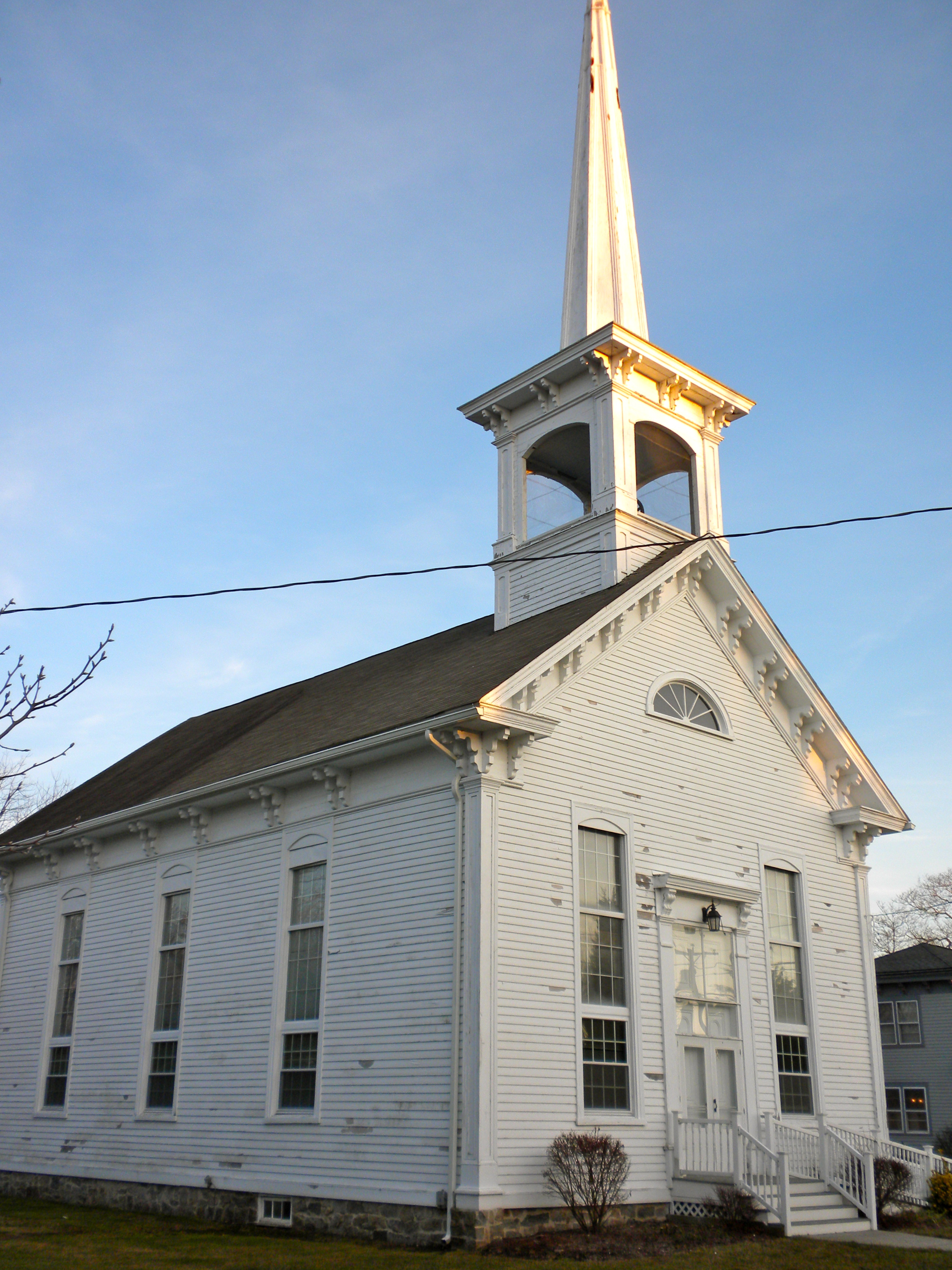
United Methodist Church on Main Street

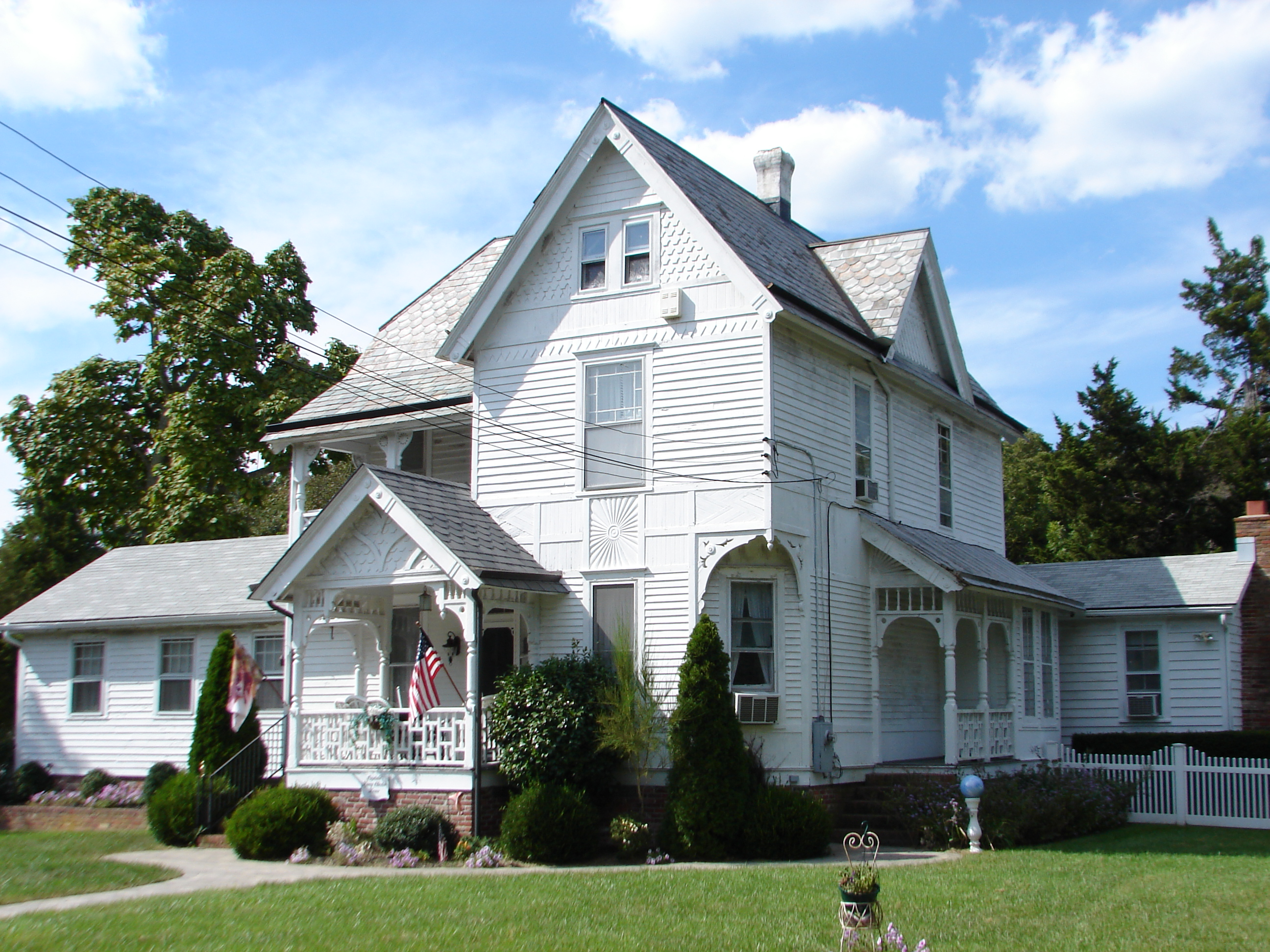
Chester House
