= New Jersey Route 347 =

State highway in New Jersey, US

Route 347

Route information
- Auxiliary route of Route 47
- Maintained by Cape May and Cumberland counties
- Length: 8.58 mi (13.81 km)
- Existed: 1990–present

Major junctions
- South end: Route 47 in Dennis Township
- CR 550 Spur in Maurice River Township; CR 550 in Maurice River Township
- North end: Route 47 in Maurice River Township

Location
- Country: United States
- State: New Jersey
- Counties: Cape May, Cumberland

Highway system
- New Jersey State Highway Routes; Interstate; US; State; Scenic Byways
← Route 324	→ Route 413

Route 347 is a state highway in the southern part of New Jersey in the United States. It is a bypass of Route 47 in Dennis Township, Cape May County, and Maurice River Township, Cumberland County, that is 8.58 mi (13.81 km) long and is completely county-maintained. Route 347 passes through dense woodland for most of its route as a two-lane undivided road. The road is a part of a major route linking the Philadelphia area with the Jersey Shore resorts of Cape May County. The route was created in the 1990s to replace Route 47 Alternate. It has been considered that Route 347 may be partially used for a potential future extension of Route 55, with improvements to the road planned.

== Route description ==
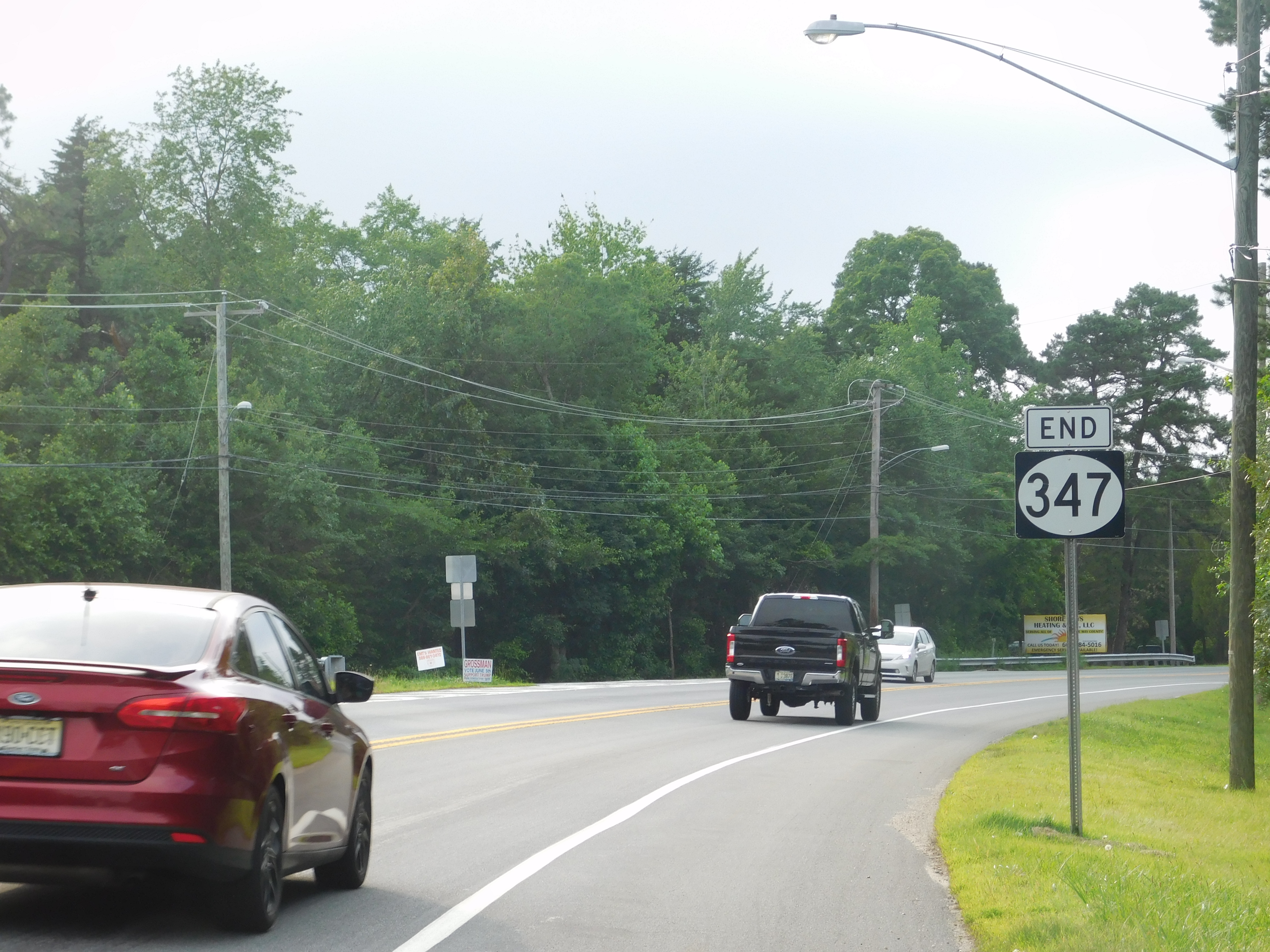
Route 347's northern terminus at Route 47 in Maurice River Township

Route 347 begins at an intersection with Route 47 in Dennis Township, Cape May County, heading to the northwest on a two-lane undivided road that is county-maintained. After passing a few residences, the road continues into dense woodland. The route passes by East Creek Pond before entering Maurice River Township in Cumberland County. After the county line, Route 347 intersects CR 550 Spur and forms a concurrency as it runs by West Creek Pond. Past the pond, CR 550 Spur splits from the road, which continues west-northwest. At the junction with CR 679, Route 347 turns to the northwest and comes to an intersection with CR 550. The road remains on its northwest trajectory as it comes to the eastern terminus of CR 670. At this intersection, the northbound direction of Route 47 turns onto Route 347 from CR 670. Route 347 ends at the point where the ramp to southbound Route 47 splits from the road, which continues north as Route 47. Route 347, along with Route 47 and Route 55, constitutes a major route connecting the Philadelphia area to the Jersey Shore resorts of Cape May County, with Route 347 serving as a bypass of a section of Route 47. The route is also part of a hurricane evacuation route for Cape May County in which contraflow lane reversal can be used for a quicker evacuation.

== History ==
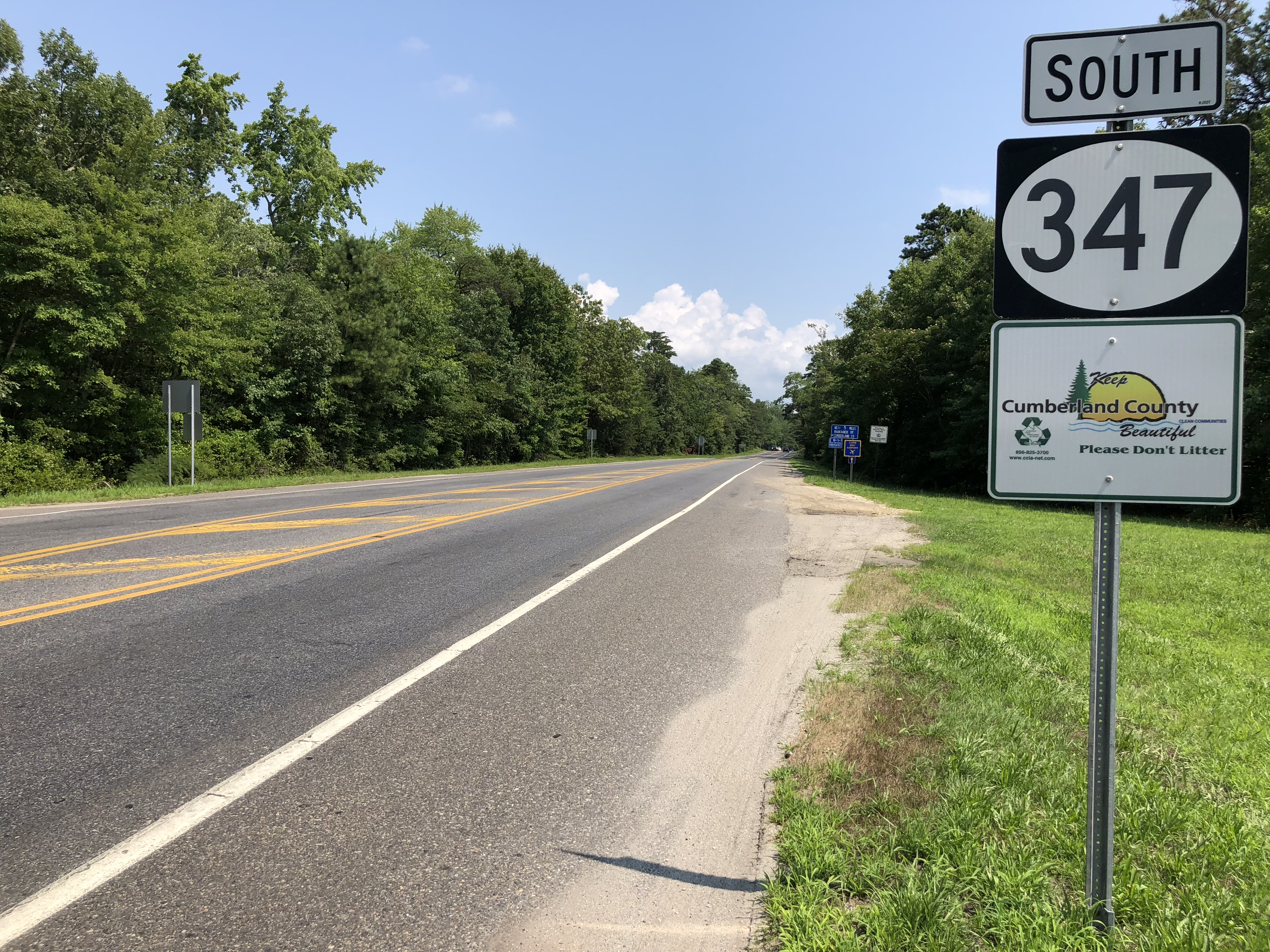
The beginning of Route 347 heading southbound at Route 47 in Maurice River Township

What is now Route 347 was originally an unnumbered local road connecting to Route 47 at both ends. Route 347 was created in the 1990s, replacing what was originally designated as Route 47 Alternate. A third lane is currently being proposed along Route 347 in order to handle additional traffic at peak times in the summer season. Either a reversible lane or extra shoulder space is being considered for the additional lane. Originally, the route was to be widened to four total lanes. Auxiliary lanes are also planned to be built at the southern terminus with Route 47 in Dennis Township and the Route 47/CR 670 junction in Maurice River Township in order to alleviate traffic. The Route 347 corridor, along with a part of Route 47, is being considered for a southern expansion of Route 55 to the Garden State Parkway in Cape May County.

== Major intersections ==
County	Location	mi	km	Destinations	Notes
Cape May	Dennis Township	0.00	0.00	Route 47 (Delsea Drive) – Wildwood	Southern terminus
Cumberland	Maurice River Township	3.26	5.25	CR 550 Spur east	South end of CR 550 Spur overlap
Cumberland	Maurice River Township	3.39	5.46	CR 550 Spur west (Hands Mill Road)	North end of CR 550 Spur overlap
Cumberland	Maurice River Township	5.33	8.58	CR 550 (Leesburg-Belleplain Road)	
Cumberland	Maurice River Township	8.58	13.81	Route 47 (Delsea Drive) to Route 55 – Camden	Northern terminus
1.000 mi = 1.609 km; 1.000 km = 0.621 mi: Concurrency terminus
