= Dennis Township, New Jersey =

Township in Cape May County, New Jersey, US

- Township
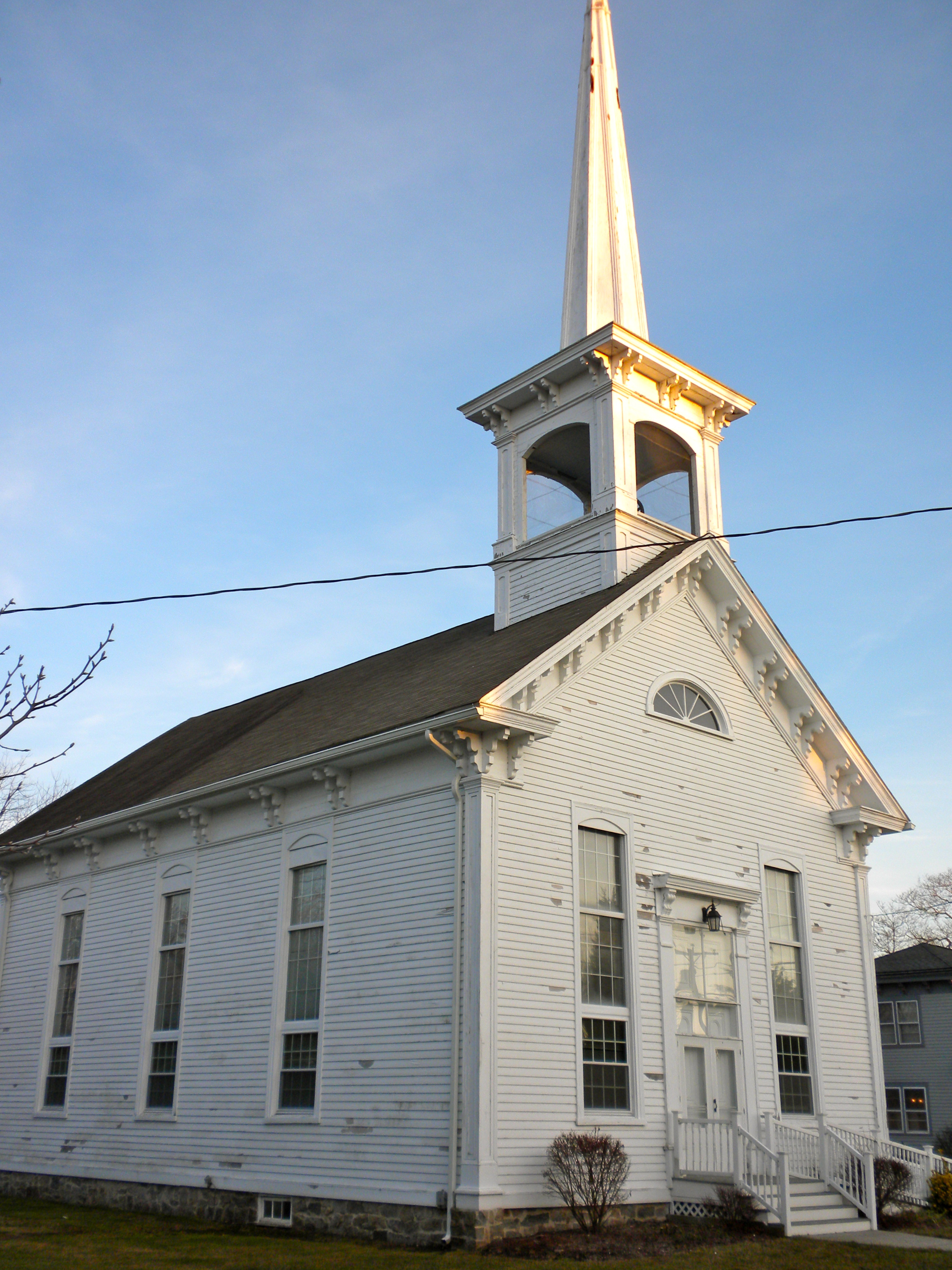
- Dennisville Historic District

- Seal

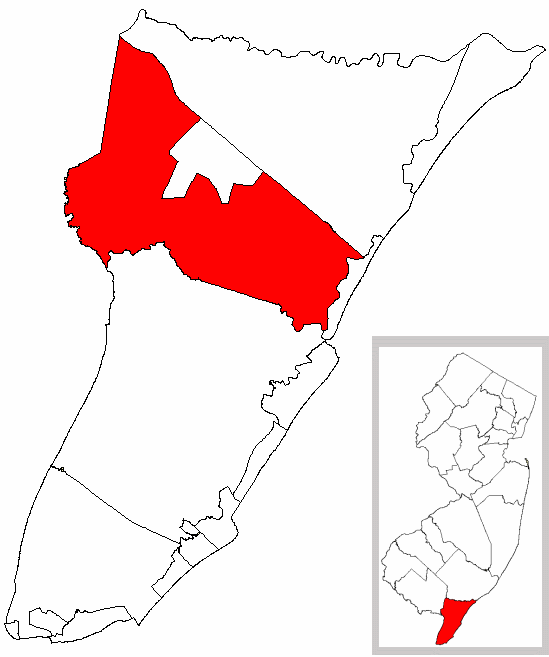
- Location of Dennis Township in Cape May County highlighted in red (left). Inset map: Location of Cape May County in New Jersey highlighted in red (right).

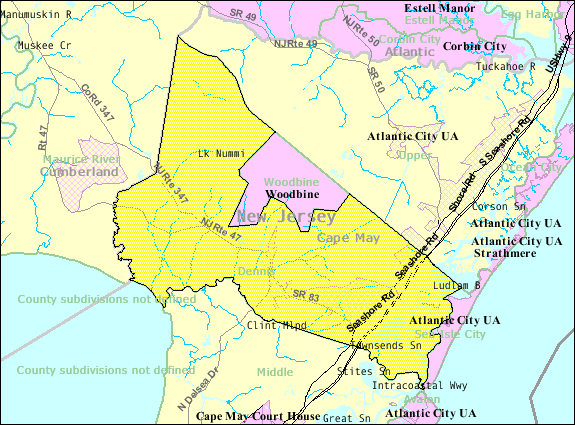
- Census Bureau map of Dennis Township, New Jersey

- Location in Cape May County Location in New Jersey Location in the United States
- Coordinates: 39.206555°N 74.818386°W
- Country: United States
- State: New Jersey
- County: Cape May
- Incorporated: March 1, 1827

Government
  - Type: Township
  - Body: Township Committee
  - Mayor: Zeth Anthony Matalucci (R, term ends December 31, 2026)
  - Administrator: Jessica Bishop
  - Municipal clerk: Jacqueline Justice

Area
  - Total: 63.94 sq mi (165.61 km^{2})
  - Land: 60.42 sq mi (156.49 km^{2})
  - Water: 3.52 sq mi (9.12 km^{2}) 5.51%
  - Rank: 19th of 565 in state 3rd of 16 in county
- Elevation: 16 ft (4.9 m)

Population (2020)
  - Total: 6,285
  - Estimate (2023): 6,149
  - Rank: 335th of 565 in state 5th of 16 in county
  - Density: 104/sq mi (40/km^{2})
  - Rank: 539th of 565 in state 16th of 16 in county
- Time zone: UTC−05:00 (Eastern (EST))
  - Summer (DST): UTC−04:00 (Eastern (EDT))
- ZIP Code: 08214 – Dennisville
- Area code: 609 exchanges: 624, 861
- FIPS code: 3400917560
- GNIS feature ID: 0882046
- Website: www.dennistwp.org

Dennis Township is a township in Cape May County, in the U.S. state of New Jersey. The township, and all of Cape May County, is part of the South Jersey region of the state and of the Ocean City metropolitan statistical area, and is part of the Philadelphia metropolitan area. As of the 2020 United States census, the township's population was 6,285, a decrease of 182 (−2.8%) from the 2010 census count of 6,467, which in turn reflected a decline of 25 (−0.4%) from the 6,492 counted in the 2000 census.

Dennis Township was incorporated as a township by an act of the New Jersey Legislature on March 1, 1827, from portions of Upper Township. Portions of the township were taken to form Sea Isle City borough (May 22, 1882) and Woodbine borough (March 3, 1903).

New Jersey Monthly magazine ranked Dennis Township as its 20th best place to live in its 2008 rankings of the "Best Places To Live" in New Jersey.

== History ==
Dennis Township had been a dry town, where alcohol could not be sold, until 2001 when voters passed a referendum allowing liquor to be sold; the township council authorized the sale of a single license, which netted the township $1.1 million.

== Geography ==
According to the United States Census Bureau, the township had a total area of 63.94 square miles (165.61 km^{2}), including 60.42 square miles (156.49 km^{2}) of land and 3.52 square miles (9.12 km^{2}) of water (5.51%).

Belleplain (2020 Census population of 614) is an unincorporated community and census-designated place (CDP) located within the township.

Dennisville (population 830) is the most important unincorporated community in Dennis Township. Ocean View (population 685) is served as ZIP Code 08230. Other communities, localities and place names located partially or completely within the township include Clermont, East Creek, Eldora, Mount Pleasant, North Dennis, North-West Dennis, Ocean View, Savage Pond, South Dennis (population 1,703), South Seaville (population 695), Stipsons Island and West Creek Landing.

The township borders the municipalities of Avalon, Middle Township, Sea Isle City, Upper Township, Woodbine Borough in Cape May County; Maurice River Township in Cumberland County; and the Delaware Bay.

== Demographics ==
Historical population
Census	Pop.	Note	%±
1830	1,513		—
1840	1,350		−10.8%
1850	1,604		18.8%
1860	1,558		−2.9%
1870	1,640		5.3%
1880	1,812		10.5%
1890	1,707	*	−5.8%
1900	2,778		62.7%
1910	1,751	*	−37.0%
1920	1,639		−6.4%
1930	1,615		−1.5%
1940	1,877		16.2%
1950	1,981		5.5%
1960	2,327		17.5%
1970	2,635		13.2%
1980	3,989		51.4%
1990	5,574		39.7%
2000	6,492		16.5%
2010	6,467		−0.4%
2020	6,285		−2.8%
2023 (est.)	6,149		−2.2%
Population sources:1830–2000 1830–1920 1840 1850–1870; 1850 1870 1880–1890; 1890–1910 1910–1930; 1940–2000 2000; 2010 2020 * = Lost territory in previous decade.

=== 2010 census ===
The 2010 United States census counted 6,467 people, 2,370 households, and 1,792 families in the township. The population density was 106.4 per square mile (41.1/km^{2}). There were 2,672 housing units at an average density of 43.9 per square mile (16.9/km^{2}). The racial makeup was 96.75% (6,257) White, 0.79% (51) Black or African American, 0.19% (12) Native American, 0.56% (36) Asian, 0.03% (2) Pacific Islander, 0.32% (21) from other races, and 1.36% (88) from two or more races. Hispanic or Latino of any race were 1.81% (117) of the population.

Of the 2,370 households, 29.5% had children under the age of 18; 60.8% were married couples living together; 9.5% had a female householder with no husband present and 24.4% were non-families. Of all households, 19.6% were made up of individuals and 8.6% had someone living alone who was 65 years of age or older. The average household size was 2.68 and the average family size was 3.07.

21.4% of the population were under the age of 18, 8.6% from 18 to 24, 20.9% from 25 to 44, 34.1% from 45 to 64, and 15.0% who were 65 years of age or older. The median age was 44.5 years. For every 100 females, the population had 96.9 males. For every 100 females ages 18 and older there were 94.1 males.

The Census Bureau's 2006–2010 American Community Survey showed that (in 2010 inflation-adjusted dollars) median household income was $84,205 (with a margin of error of +/− $5,160) and the median family income was $84,400 (+/− $4,219). Males had a median income of $52,571 (+/− $3,535) versus $40,023 (+/− $5,496) for females. The per capita income for the borough was $30,545 (+/− $2,875). About 5.4% of families and 7.6% of the population were below the poverty line, including 12.0% of those under age 18 and 5.4% of those age 65 or over.

=== 2000 census ===
As of the 2000 United States census there were 6,492 people, 2,159 households, and 1,737 families residing in the township. The population density was 105.8 inhabitants per square mile (40.8/km^{2}). There were 2,327 housing units at an average density of 37.9 per square mile (14.6/km^{2}). The racial makeup of the township was 97.43% White, 0.96% African American, 0.09% Native American, 0.43% Asian, 0.02% Pacific Islander, 0.62% from other races, and 0.46% from two or more races. Hispanic or Latino of any race were 1.51% of the population.

There were 2,159 households, out of which 41.7% had children under the age of 18 living with them, 65.9% were married couples living together, 9.8% had a female householder with no husband present, and 19.5% were non-families. 15.4% of all households were made up of individuals, and 5.7% had someone living alone who was 65 years of age or older. The average household size was 2.91 and the average family size was 3.24.

In the township the population was spread out, with 28.3% under the age of 18, 6.4% from 18 to 24, 30.6% from 25 to 44, 22.5% from 45 to 64, and 12.3% who were 65 years of age or older. The median age was 37 years. For every 100 females, there were 96.5 males. For every 100 females age 18 and over, there were 93.4 males.

The median income for a household in the township was $56,595, and the median income for a family was $61,445. Males had a median income of $41,404 versus $31,329 for females. The per capita income for the township was $21,455. About 4.0% of families and 5.5% of the population were below the poverty line, including 6.6% of those under age 18 and 4.2% of those age 65 or over.

== Government ==
=== Local government ===
Dennis Township is governed under the Township form of New Jersey municipal government, one of 141 municipalities (of the 564) statewide that use this form, the second-most commonly used form of government in the state. The Township Committee is comprised of five members, who are elected directly by the voters at-large in partisan elections to serve three-year terms of office on a staggered basis, with either one or two seats coming up for election each year as part of the November general election in a three-year cycle. At an annual reorganization meeting, the Township Committee selects one of its members to serve as Mayor and another as Deputy Mayor. The Committee members serve in a part-time capacity and receive an annual salary.

Since its establishment, the governing body had consisted of three elected officials, one of whom would be elected by the membership to serve as the Mayor. In 1989, voters approved a ballot question to increase the membership from three members to five members, and in November 1990 the voters elected two additional committee members. The first five-member committee took office in January 1991 at which time the governing body established the position of township administrator.

As of 2026, the members of the Dennis Township Committee are Mayor Zeth Anthony Matalucci (R, term on committee ends December 31, 2028; term as mayor ends 2026), Deputy Mayor Scott J. Turner (R, term on committee and as deputy mayor ends 2026), Matthew J. Cox (R, 2028), Frank L. Germanio Jr. (R, 2027) and Thomas Van Artsdalen III (R, 2026).

In October 2017, the Township Committee appointed Nicolas Elisano to fill the seat expiring December 2019 that became vacant following the resignation of Melanie Smith, who was moving out of the township. In November 2018, Matthew J. Cox was elected to serve the balance of the term of office.

=== Federal, state and county representation ===
Dennis Township is located in the 2nd Congressional District and is part of New Jersey's 1st state legislative district.

For the 119th United States Congress, New Jersey's 2nd congressional district is represented by Jeff Van Drew (R, Dennis Township). New Jersey is represented in the United States Senate by Democrats Cory Booker (Newark, term ends 2027) and Andy Kim (Moorestown, term ends 2031).

For the 2026–2027 session, the 1st legislative district of the New Jersey Legislature is represented in the State Senate by Mike Testa (R, Vineland) and in the General Assembly by Antwan McClellan (R, Ocean City) and Erik K. Simonsen (R, Lower Township).

Cape May County is governed by a five-person Board of County Commissioners whose members are elected at-large on a partisan basis to three-year terms of office on a staggered basis, with either one or two seats coming up for election each year; At an annual reorganization held each January, the commissioners select one member to serve as director and another to serve as vice-director. As of 2026, Cape May County's Commissioners are Director Leonard C. Desiderio (R, Sea Isle City, term as commissioner ends December 31, 2027; term as director ends 2026), Vice-Director Andrew Bulakowski (R, Lower Township; term as commissioner ends 2028; term as vice-director ends 2026). Robert Barr (R, Ocean City; 2028) and Will Morey (R, Wildwood Crest; 2026), with one seat expiring in December 2026 vacant after Melanie Collette resigned from office in March 2026. The county's constitutional officers are Clerk Rita Marie Rothberg (R, Ocean City; 2030), Sheriff Robert Nolan (R, Lower Township; 2026) and Surrogate E. Marie Hayes (R, Ocean City; 2028).

=== Politics ===
As of March 2011, there were a total of 4,499 registered voters in Dennis Township, of which 1,091 (24.2%) were registered as Democrats, 1,527 (33.9%) were registered as Republicans and 1,877 (41.7%) were registered as Unaffiliated. There were 4 voters registered as Libertarians or Greens.

Gubernatorial election results for Dennis Township
Year	Republican		Democratic		Third party(ies)	
Year	No.	%	No.	%	No.	%
2025	1,991	63.83%	1,111	35.62%	17	0.55%
2021	1,917	70.22%	791	28.97%	22	0.81%
2017	1,167	52.28%	1,004	44.98%	61	2.73%
2013	1,647	69.06%	702	29.43%	36	1.51%
2009	1,251	52.63%	894	37.61%	232	9.76%
2005	1,083	48.74%	1,012	45.54%	127	5.72%

In the 2012 presidential election, Republican Mitt Romney received 55.5% of the vote (1,809 cast), ahead of Democrat Barack Obama with 43.1% (1,406 votes), and other candidates with 1.4% (45 votes), among the 3,296 ballots cast by the township's 4,624 registered voters (36 ballots were spoiled), for a turnout of 71.3%. In the 2008 presidential election, Republican John McCain received 55.4% of the vote (1,904 cast), ahead of Democrat Barack Obama, who received 42.4% (1,459 votes), with 3,437 ballots cast among the township's 4,331 registered voters, for a turnout of 79.4%. In the 2004 presidential election, Republican George W. Bush received 58.1% of the vote (1,977 ballots cast), outpolling Democrat John Kerry, who received around 40.0% (1,362 votes), with 3,401 ballots cast among the township's 4,424 registered voters, for a turnout percentage of 76.9.

Presidential elections results
Year	Republican	Democratic
2024	66.3% 2,623	32.1% 1,272
2020	62.8% 2,573	35.5% 1,456
2016	61.8% 2,160	33.3% 1,164
2012	55.5% 1,809	43.1% 1,406
2008	55.4% 1,904	42.4% 1,459
2004	58.1% 1,977	40.0% 1,362

In the 2013 gubernatorial election, Republican Chris Christie received 69.1% of the vote (1,647 cast), ahead of Democrat Barbara Buono with 29.4% (702 votes), and other candidates with 1.5% (36 votes), among the 2,481 ballots cast by the township's 4,559 registered voters (96 ballots were spoiled), for a turnout of 54.4%. In the 2009 gubernatorial election, Republican Chris Christie received 51.9% of the vote (1,251 ballots cast), ahead of both Democrat Jon Corzine with 37.1% (894 votes) and Independent Chris Daggett with 8.2% (197 votes), with 2,411 ballots cast among the township's 4,572 registered voters, yielding a 52.7% turnout.

United States Senate election results for Dennis Township1
Year	Republican		Democratic		Third party(ies)	
Year	No.	%	No.	%	No.	%
2024	2,494	66.86%	1,198	32.12%	38	1.02%
2018	1,847	63.67%	967	33.33%	87	3.00%
2012	1,554	52.17%	1,367	45.89%	58	1.95%
2006	1,220	54.44%	955	42.61%	66	2.95%

United States Senate election results for Dennis Township2
Year	Republican		Democratic		Third party(ies)	
Year	No.	%	No.	%	No.	%
2020	2,433	62.43%	1,395	35.80%	69	1.77%
2014	1,133	55.05%	889	43.20%	36	1.75%
2013	686	60.55%	428	37.78%	19	1.68%
2008	1,558	50.50%	1,445	46.84%	82	2.66%

== Education ==
The Dennis Township Public Schools serve students in pre-kindergarten through eighth grade. As of the 2024–25 school year, the district, comprised of two schools, had an enrollment of 651 students and 49.4 classroom teachers (on an FTE basis), for a student–teacher ratio of 13.2:1. Schools in the district (with 2024–25 enrollment from the National Center for Education Statistics) are Dennis Township Primary School with 242 students in grades PreK-2 and Dennis Township Elementary / Middle School with 391 students in grades 3-8.

Students in public school for ninth through twelfth grades attend Middle Township High School in Cape May Court House, together with students from Avalon, Stone Harbor and Woodbine, as part of a sending/receiving relationship with the Middle Township Public Schools. As of the 2024–25 school year, the high school had an enrollment of 821 students and 68.0 classroom teachers (on an FTE basis), for a student–teacher ratio of 12.1:1.

Students are also eligible to attend the Cape May County Technical High School in Cape May Court House, which serves students from the entire county in its comprehensive and vocational programs, which are offered without charge to students who are county residents.

The Roman Catholic Diocese of Camden operates Bishop McHugh Regional School, a Catholic K–8 school. It is supported by four parishes in Cape May County. The school has a Cape May Courthouse postal address. The Press of Atlantic City describes the school as being in Ocean View, though it lies outside of the Ocean View CDP.

== Transportation ==
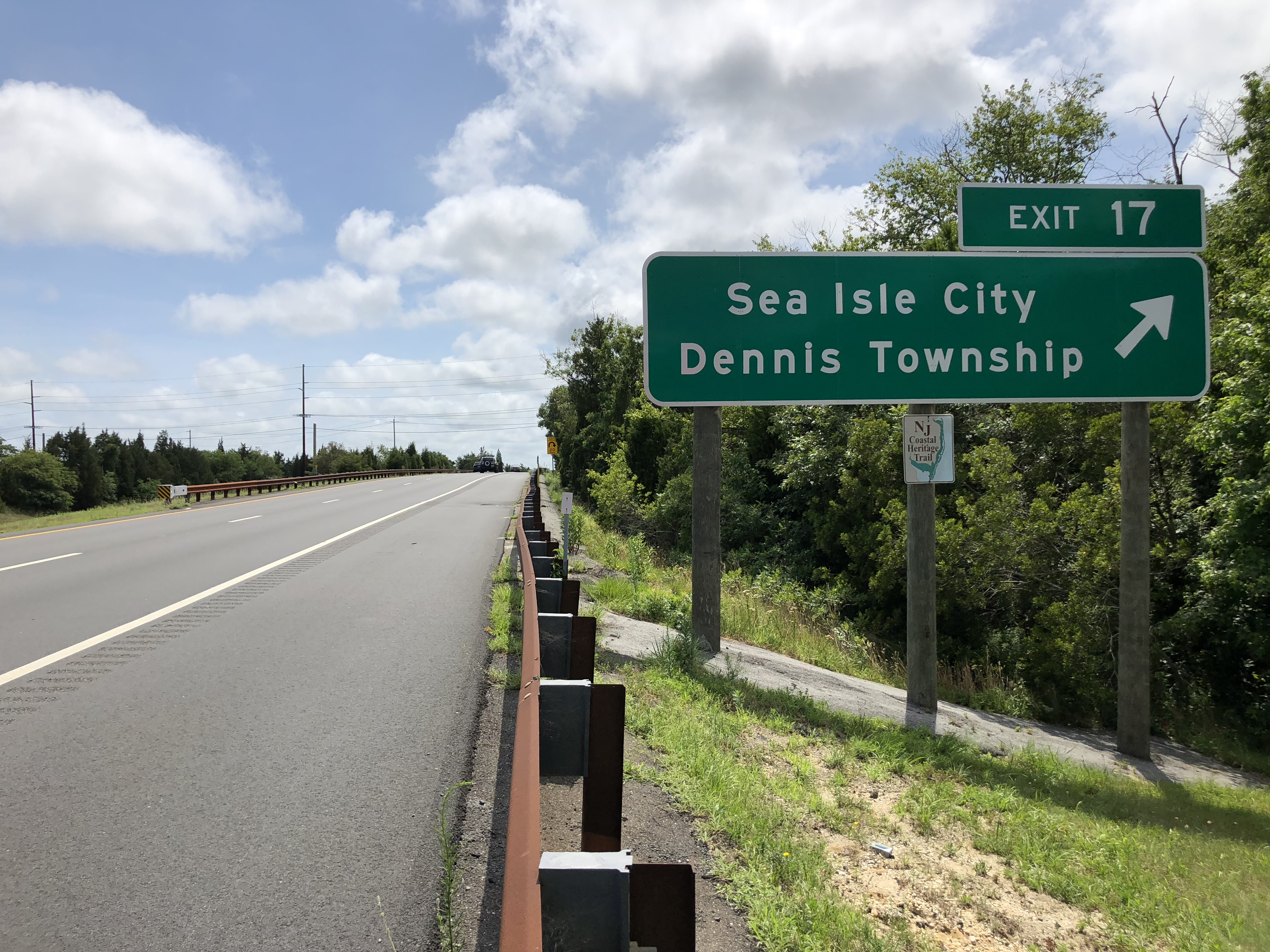
The Garden State Parkway southbound at exit 17 in Dennis Township

As of May 2010, the township had a total of 112.5 miles (181.1 km) of roadways, of which 58.7 miles (94.5 km) were maintained by the municipality, 32.9 miles (52.9 km) by Cape May County, 16.7 miles (26.9 km) by the New Jersey Department of Transportation and 4.2 miles (6.8 km) by the New Jersey Turnpike Authority.

The Garden State Parkway is the most prominent highway serving Dennis Township, running for more than 4.1 miles (6.6 km) through the township. Other significant roads serving the township include U.S. Route 9, New Jersey Route 47, New Jersey Route 83 and New Jersey Route 347.

== Notable people ==
People who were born in, residents of, or otherwise closely associated with Dennis Township include:

- Richard S. Leaming (1828–1895), ship builder and politician who served in both the New Jersey General Assembly and the New Jersey Senate and on the Cape May County Board of Chosen Freeholders
- Jonathan Maslow (1948–2008), author who wrote extensively about nature, with a focus on obscure and little-understood animals
- Jarrett Porter (born 1993), baritone known for his performances as an opera and lieder singer.
- Willie Royster (1954–2015), catcher who played in four games for the Baltimore Orioles in 1981
- Joshua Swain (1778–1855), politician and inventor
- Jeff Van Drew (born 1953), U.S. Representative for New Jersey's 2nd congressional district and former member of the New Jersey Senate, representing the 1st legislative district

== See also ==
- Dennisville, New Jersey
- Dennisville Historic District
