= Dennis Township Public Schools =

School district in Cape May County, New Jersey, US

Address
- 601 Hagen Road Dennis Township, Cape May County, New Jersey, 08210; United States
- Coordinates: 39.170424°N 74.794649°W

District information
- Grades: PreK-8
- Superintendent: Steve Price (interim)
- Business administrator: Lisa DiNovi (interim)
- Schools: 2

Students and staff
- Enrollment: 651 (as of 2024–25)
- Faculty: 49.4 FTEs
- Student–teacher ratio: 13.2:1

Other information
- District Factor Group: CD
- Website: Official website
Ind.	Per pupil	District spending	Rank (*)	K-8 average	%± vs. average
1A	Total Spending	$22,733	59	$18,891	20.3%
1	Budgetary Cost	15,442	43	14,159	9.1%
2	Classroom Instruction	9,506	46	8,659	9.8%
6	Support Services	1,995	22	2,167	−7.9%
8	Administrative Cost	1,715	34	1,547	10.9%
10	Operations & Maintenance	1,852	50	1,612	14.9%
13	Extracurricular Activities	92	22	104	−11.5%
16	Median Teacher Salary	65,849	46	61,136
Data from NJDoE 2014 Taxpayers' Guide to Education Spending. *Of K-8 districts with 401-750 students. Lowest spending=1; Highest=64

The Dennis Township School District, or Dennis Township Public Schools, are a community public school district that serves students in pre-kindergarten through eighth grade from Dennis Township, in Cape May County, in the U.S. state of New Jersey.

As of the 2024–25 school year, the district, comprised of two schools, had an enrollment of 651 students and 49.4 classroom teachers (on an FTE basis), for a student–teacher ratio of 13.2:1.

The district had been classified by the New Jersey Department of Education as being in District Factor Group "CD", the sixth-highest of eight groupings. District Factor Groups organize districts statewide to allow comparison by common socioeconomic characteristics of the local districts. From lowest socioeconomic status to highest, the categories are A, B, CD, DE, FG, GH, I and J.

Students in public school for ninth through twelfth grades attend Middle Township High School in Cape May Court House, together with students from Avalon, Stone Harbor and Woodbine, as part of a sending/receiving relationship with the Middle Township Public Schools. As of the 2024–25 school year, the high school had an enrollment of 821 students and 68.0 classroom teachers (on an FTE basis), for a student–teacher ratio of 12.1:1.

== Schools ==
Schools in the district (with 2024–25 enrollment from the National Center for Education Statistics) are:

- Dennis Township Primary School with 242 students in grades PreK-2
- Dennis Township Elementary / Middle School with 391 students in grades 3-8
  - Steve Wilchensky, interim principal

== Administration ==
Core members of the district's administration are:

- Steve Price, interim chief school administrator
- Lisa DiNovi, interim business administrator and board secretary

== Board of education ==
The district's board of education, comprised of nine elected members, sets policy and oversees the fiscal and educational operation of the district through its administration. As a Type II school district, the board's trustees are elected directly by voters to serve three-year terms of office on a staggered basis, with three seats up for election each year held (since 2012) as part of the November general election. The board appoints a superintendent to oversee the district's day-to-day operations and a business administrator to supervise the business functions of the district.
