= Stone Harbor Bird Sanctuary =

Bird sanctuary in New Jersey, USA

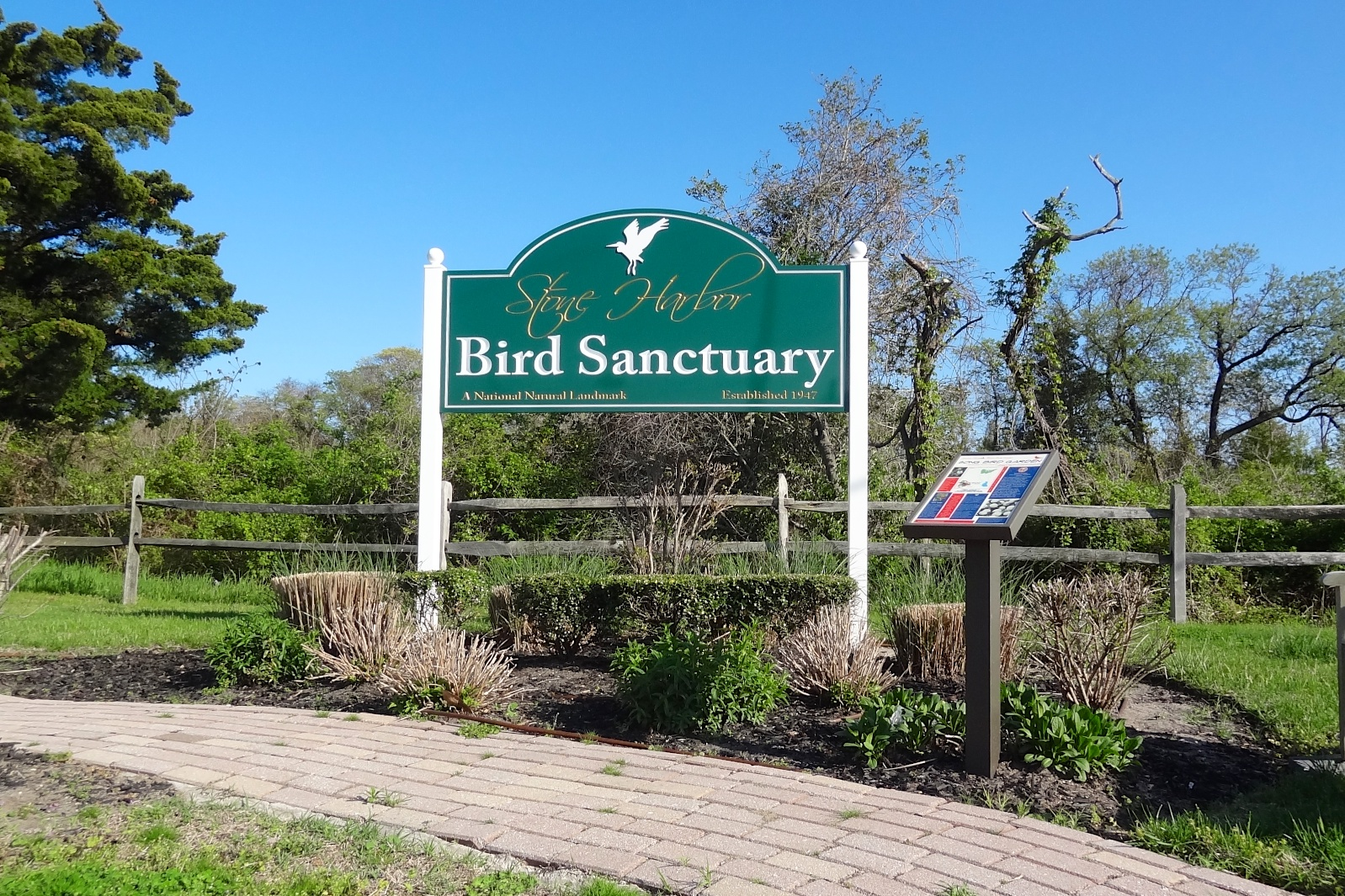

- Location within Cape May County, New Jersey
- Location: Cape May County, New Jersey
- Nearest city: Stone Harbor
- Coordinates: 39°02′30″N 74°46′08″W
- Area: 21.5 acres (8.7 ha)
- Established: 1947

U.S. National Natural Landmark
- Designated: 1965

Stone Harbor Bird Sanctuary is a 21.5-acre (8.7 ha) bird sanctuary and nature preserve in Stone Harbor, Cape May County, New Jersey. It was created in 1947 by local ordinance. It was designated a National Natural Landmark in October 1965, the first in New Jersey.

== History ==
Herons began nesting in the area that became the sanctuary around 1938. The town protected the site in 1947 and put up a fence surrounding the site in 1961. As of 1964, more than 5,000 birds would arrive for nesting season from March through July and would stay until December. Beginning around 1995, the numbers of nesting shore birds such as herons returning to the Sanctuary began decreasing, eventually almost entirely disappearing by 2000. In 2005, the Sanctuary began a rejuvenation project to improve conditions for the nesting shore birds in the hope of them returning. Among other actions, they plan to increase the flow of tidal water to the site, remove non-native invasive species of plants and add nature trails for visitors.

== Flora and fauna ==
The site is covered in dense bushes and shrubs which provide shelter, as well as a fresh water pond, a fresh water meadow and a maritime forest. Nearby Nummy Island is a salt marsh which offers feeding and nesting grounds.

Before they mysteriously disappeared in 1995, a number of species have been spotted at the Sanctuary, including snowy egrets, glossy ibis, black-crowned and yellow-crowned night herons, little blue herons, green herons and tri-colored herons. In 2003, The Wetlands Institute identified the American redstart, black and white warbler, black-throated blue warbler, downy woodpecker and sharp-shinned hawk, but none of the egrets and herons that were traditionally identified with the area. In 2005, a number of feral cats were trapped and removed from the site, leading to fines for anyone caught feeding stray cats without a license.

== See also ==
- The Wetlands Institute
