= Stone Harbor School District =

School district in Cape May County, New Jersey, US

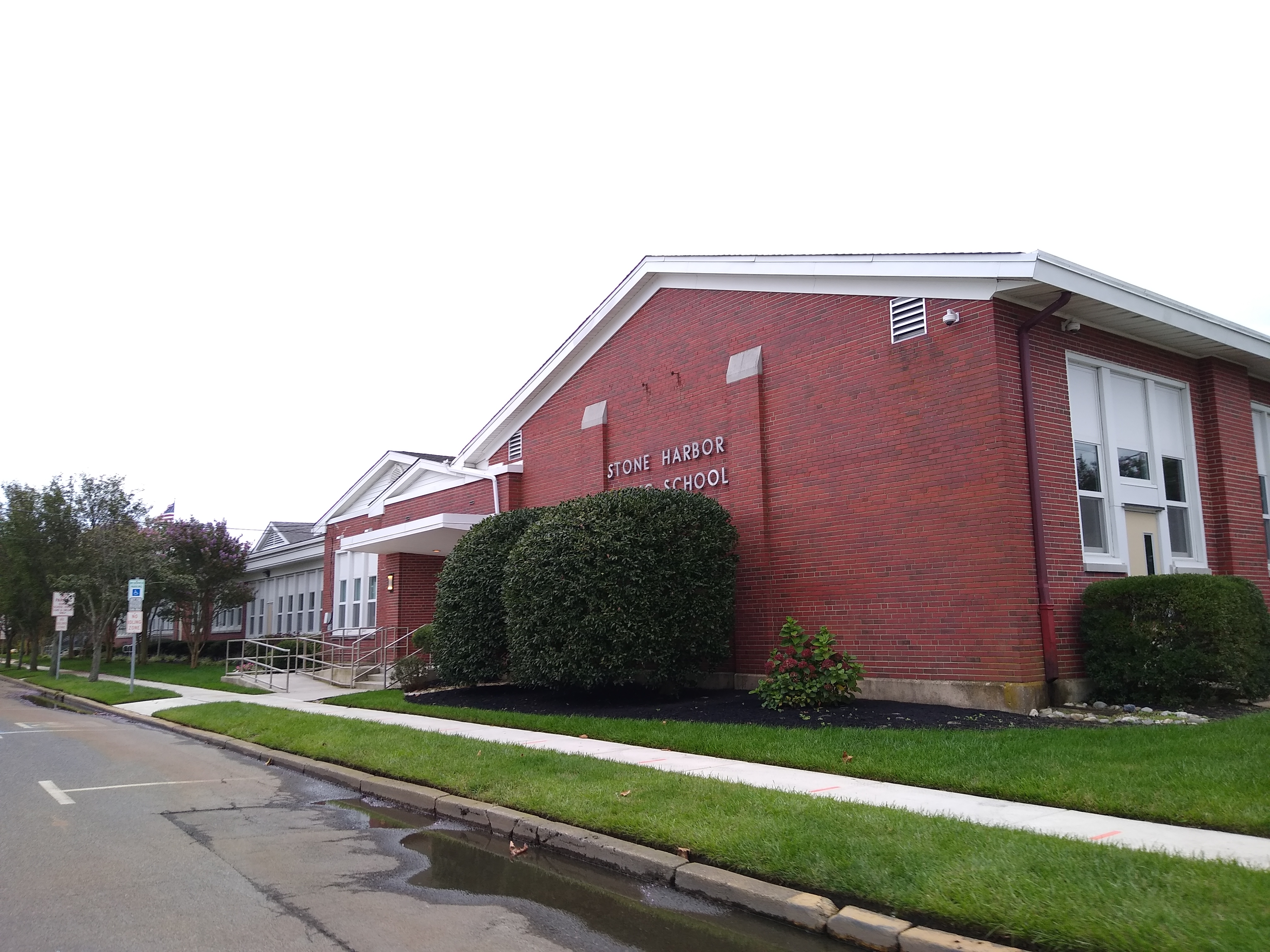

Address
- 275 93rd Street Stone Harbor, Cape May County, New Jersey, 08247; United States
- Coordinates: 39.056039°N 74.758565°W

District information
- Grades: K-8
- Superintendent: Kathleen Fox
- Business administrator: Linda Fiori
- Schools: 1

Students and staff
- Enrollment: 78 (as of 2023–24)
- Faculty: 9.7 FTEs
- Student–teacher ratio: 8.1:1

Other information
- District Factor Group: FG
- Website: District website
Ind.	Per pupil	District spending	Rank (*)	K-8 average	%± vs. average
1A	Total Spending	$33,301	70	$18,891	76.3%
1	Budgetary Cost	26,504	69	14,159	87.2%
2	Classroom Instruction	16,226	70	8,659	87.4%
6	Support Services	4,634	67	2,167	113.8%
8	Administrative Cost	1,826	54	1,547	18.0%
10	Operations & Maintenance	3,649	68	1,612	126.4%
13	Extracurricular Activities	132	33	104	26.9%
16	Median Teacher Salary	78,779	71	61,136
Data from NJDoE 2014 Taxpayers' Guide to Education Spending. *Of K-8 districts with up to 400 students. Lowest spending=1; Highest=71

The Stone Harbor School District is a community public school district that serves students in kindergarten through eighth grade from Stone Harbor, in Cape May County, in the U.S. state of New Jersey.

As of the 2023–24 school year, the district, comprised of one school, had an enrollment of 78 students and 9.7 classroom teachers (on an FTE basis), for a student–teacher ratio of 8.1:1.

The Avalon and Stone Harbor school districts operate like a single school district even though they are legally two separate districts; they can move teachers between the two schools. In terms of their student populations both districts having among the lowest numbers in New Jersey. As of 2013 both school districts have a single school bus. The property tax rates are 5 cents per $100 of assessed value, relatively low in the state, as the two districts have substantial taxable rateables of summer houses.

Students in public school for ninth through twelfth grades attend Middle Township High School in Cape May Court House, as part of a sending/receiving relationship with the Middle Township Public Schools, together with students from Avalon, Dennis Township and Woodbine. As of the 2023–24 school year, the high school had an enrollment of 825 students and 66.0 classroom teachers (on an FTE basis), for a student–teacher ratio of 12.5:1.

== History ==
Starting with the 2011–12 school year, in an agreement with the Avalon School District, public school students in grades K-4 from both communities attend school in Stone Harbor while all students in grades 5-8 attend school in Avalon.

In the 2016–17 school year, Stone Harbor had the 4th-smallest enrollment of any school district in the state, with 75 students.

The district had been classified by the New Jersey Department of Education as being in District Factor Group "FG", the fourth-highest of eight groupings. District Factor Groups organize districts statewide to allow comparison by common socioeconomic characteristics of the local districts. From lowest socioeconomic status to highest, the categories are A, B, CD, DE, FG, GH, I and J.

== Curriculum ==
The student sharing agreement means the Avalon and Stone Harbor districts retain foreign language and extracurricular programs they would not otherwise have.

== School ==
Stone Harbor School had a student body of 99 students in the 2023–24 school year.

In 2016 the school had 78 students. About 40% of the combined Avalon and Stone Harbor students were from out of district and paid tuition, with many coming from the Cape May Court House area.

== Administration ==
Core members of the district's administration are:

- Kathleen Fox, superintendent
- Linda Fiori, business administrator and board secretary

== Board of education ==
The district's board of education, comprised of five members, sets policy and oversees the fiscal and educational operation of the district through its administration. As a Type II school district, the board's trustees are elected directly by voters to serve three-year terms of office on a staggered basis, with either one or two seats up for election each year held (since 2012) as part of the November general election. The board appoints a superintendent to oversee the district's day-to-day operations and a business administrator to supervise the business functions of the district. An additional representative is appointed by the Avalon district to represent its interests on the Stone Harbor board.
