= Avalon, New Jersey =

Borough in New Jersey, United States

- Borough
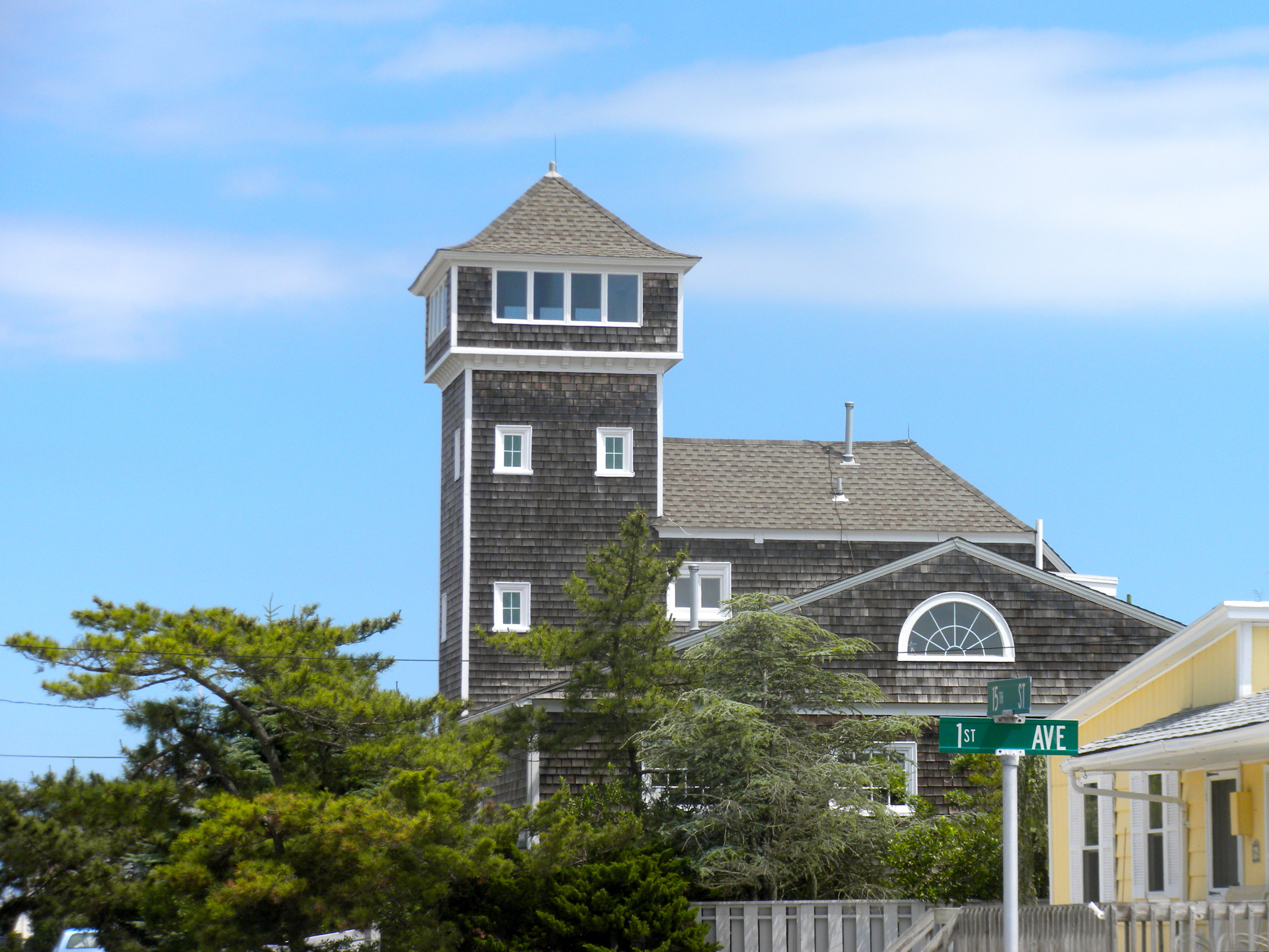
- Former Avalon Lighthouse

- Motto: "Cooler by a Mile"
- Location of Avalon in Cape May County highlighted in red (left). Inset map: Location of Cape May County in New Jersey highlighted in orange (right).

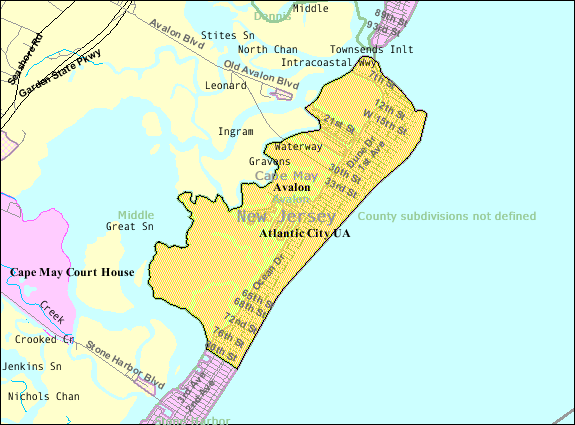
- Census Bureau map of Avalon, New Jersey

- Location in Cape May County Location in New Jersey Location in the United States
- Coordinates: 39.086453°N 74.739003°W
- Country: United States
- State: New Jersey
- County: Cape May
- Formed: 1723 as part of Middle Township
- Incorporated: April 18, 1892
- Named for: Avalon of Arthurian legend

Government
  - Type: Faulkner Act (mayor–council)
  - Body: Borough Council
  - Mayor: John M. McCorristin (R, term ends June 30, 2027)
  - Administrator: Scott J. Wahl
  - Municipal clerk: C. Danielle Nollett

Area
  - Total: 5.05 sq mi (13.09 km^{2})
  - Land: 4.27 sq mi (11.06 km^{2})
  - Water: 0.79 sq mi (2.04 km^{2}) 15.53%
  - Rank: 275th of 565 in state 7th of 16 in county
- Elevation: 10 ft (3.0 m)

Population (2020)
  - Total: 1,243
  - Estimate (2023): 1,218
  - Rank: 523rd of 565 in state 12th of 16 in county
  - Density: 291.1/sq mi (112.4/km^{2})
  - Rank: 476th of 565 in state 12th of 16 in county
- Time zone: UTC−05:00 (Eastern (EST))
  - Summer (DST): UTC−04:00 (Eastern (EDT))
- ZIP Code: 08202
- Area codes: 609 Exchanges: 263, 368, 967
- FIPS code: 3400902320
- GNIS feature ID: 0885146
- Website: www.avalonboro.net

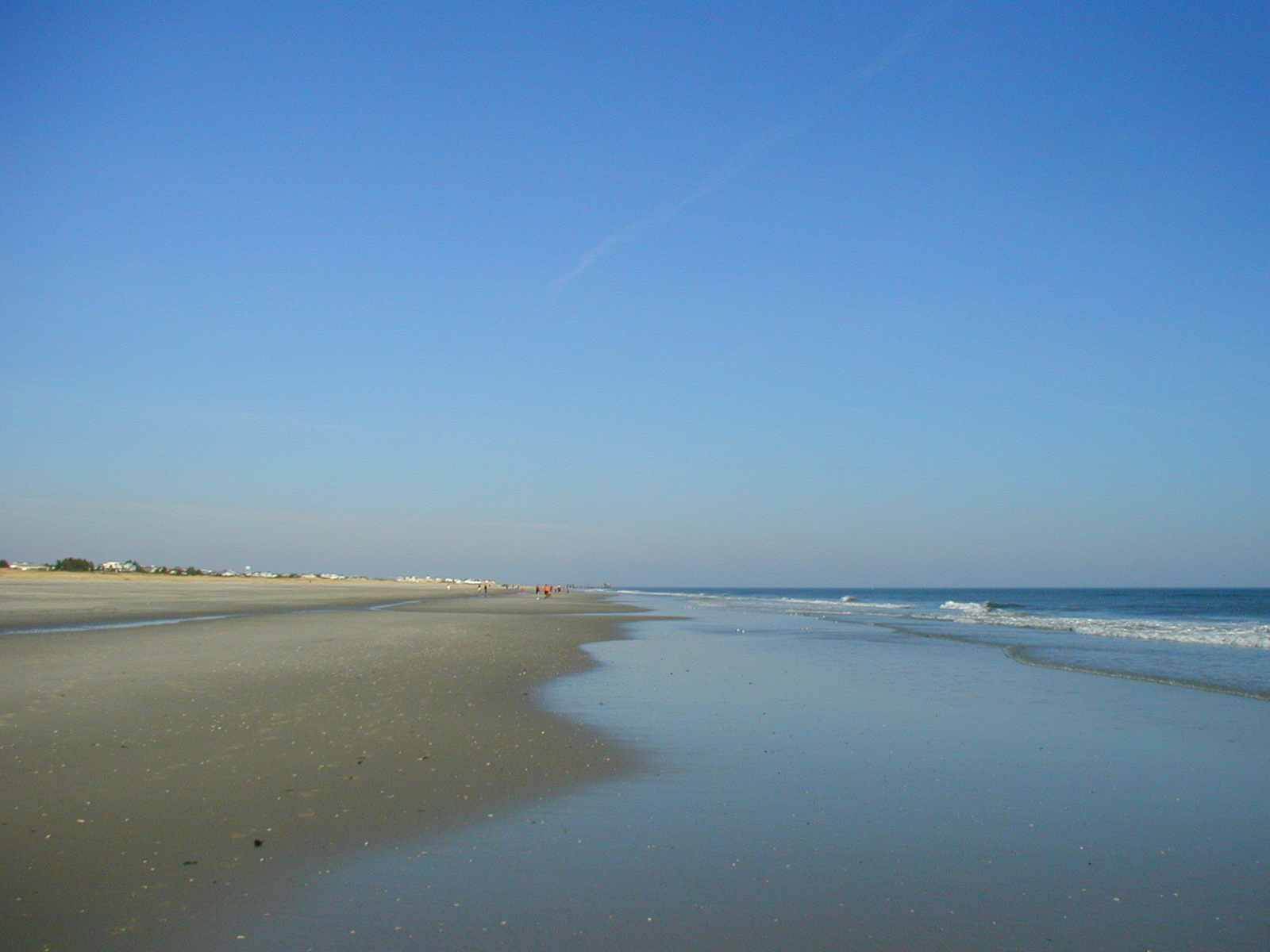
One of Avalon's beaches on the New Jersey shore

Avalon is a borough in Cape May County, New Jersey, United States. It is located on Seven Mile Island. As of the 2020 United States census, the borough's population was 1,243, a decrease of 91 (−6.8%) from the 2010 census count of 1,334, which in turn declined by 809 (−37.8%) from the 2,143 counted in the 2000 census. The borough's population swells to as many as 45,000 during the summer.

Geographically part of the South Jersey region, the community is one of the most affluent communities along the Jersey Shore and is home to some of the most expensive real estate on the East Coast. In 2007, Forbes listed Avalon as the 65th most expensive ZIP Code in the United States. Washingtonian "named Avalon the 'chicest beach' in the mid-Atlantic, the place to see women in diamonds and designer swimwear." A small portion of Avalon is not on Seven Mile Island. The borough, and all of Cape May County, is part of the Ocean City metropolitan statistical area, and is part of the Philadelphia metropolitan area.

Avalon is known as a South Jersey seashore resort and has the motto "Cooler by a Mile" since it juts out into the Atlantic Ocean about a mile farther than other barrier islands. Alternatively, the motto is because Avalon, at four miles long, is one mile longer than its neighboring town on the southern end of Seven Mile Island, Stone Harbor. It was ranked the seventh-best beach in New Jersey in the 2008 Top 10 Beaches Contest sponsored by the New Jersey Marine Sciences Consortium.

== History ==
Around 14,000 years ago, the barrier islands of Cape May County formed, likely from spits and lines of dunes. Originally a thriving juniper forest occupied by Lenni Lenape Native Americans, the area was purchased by Aaron Leaming in December 1722 for 79 pounds. Known as Seven Mile Beach (which included present-day Avalon and Stone Harbor), it was owned and retained by the Leamings for approximately 100 years. Unconfirmed legends say that pirates buried their bounty on Seven Mile Island, and that Henry Hudson may have dropped anchor somewhere offshore. The island served as a cattle range and was also used for its plentiful timber. The Leamings eventually sold the land, and the island exchanged hands in a number of transactions afterwards. In April 1887, the Seven Mile Beach company was formed. As early as 1893, Avalon was advertised as a resort town. With this rapid development, homes and businesses were erected. The native juniper forest was graded and cut, and the sandy hills were leveled off, making the island mostly flat. Today it is extremely rare to see hills or native juniper in Avalon.

Avalon was incorporated as a borough by an act of the New Jersey Legislature on April 18, 1892, from portions of Middle Township, based on the results of a referendum held two days earlier. The borough was reincorporated on March 6, 1896, and again on May 4, 1897. Another portion of Middle Township was annexed in 1910. On December 27, 1941, portions of Avalon were ceded to Stone Harbor. The borough is named for Avalon of Arthurian legend.

On January 4, 1890, the Commonwealth, piloted by Captain W.S. Willets, sank. This 197-ton ship was en route from New York City to Philadelphia with a cargo of molasses, coffee, tobacco, tea, coconut oil, and camphor. Straying from its course in rough weather, the Commonwealth ran aground in Townsend's Inlet. The crew was rescued and most of the cargo was salvaged. However, after a week trapped in the sandy bottom of the inlet, the ship began to come apart in the waves. Some of the remaining cargo washed ashore and most of it was taken by the early residents of Avalon. The wreck, unable to be recovered, was sold to John Townshend on February 2.

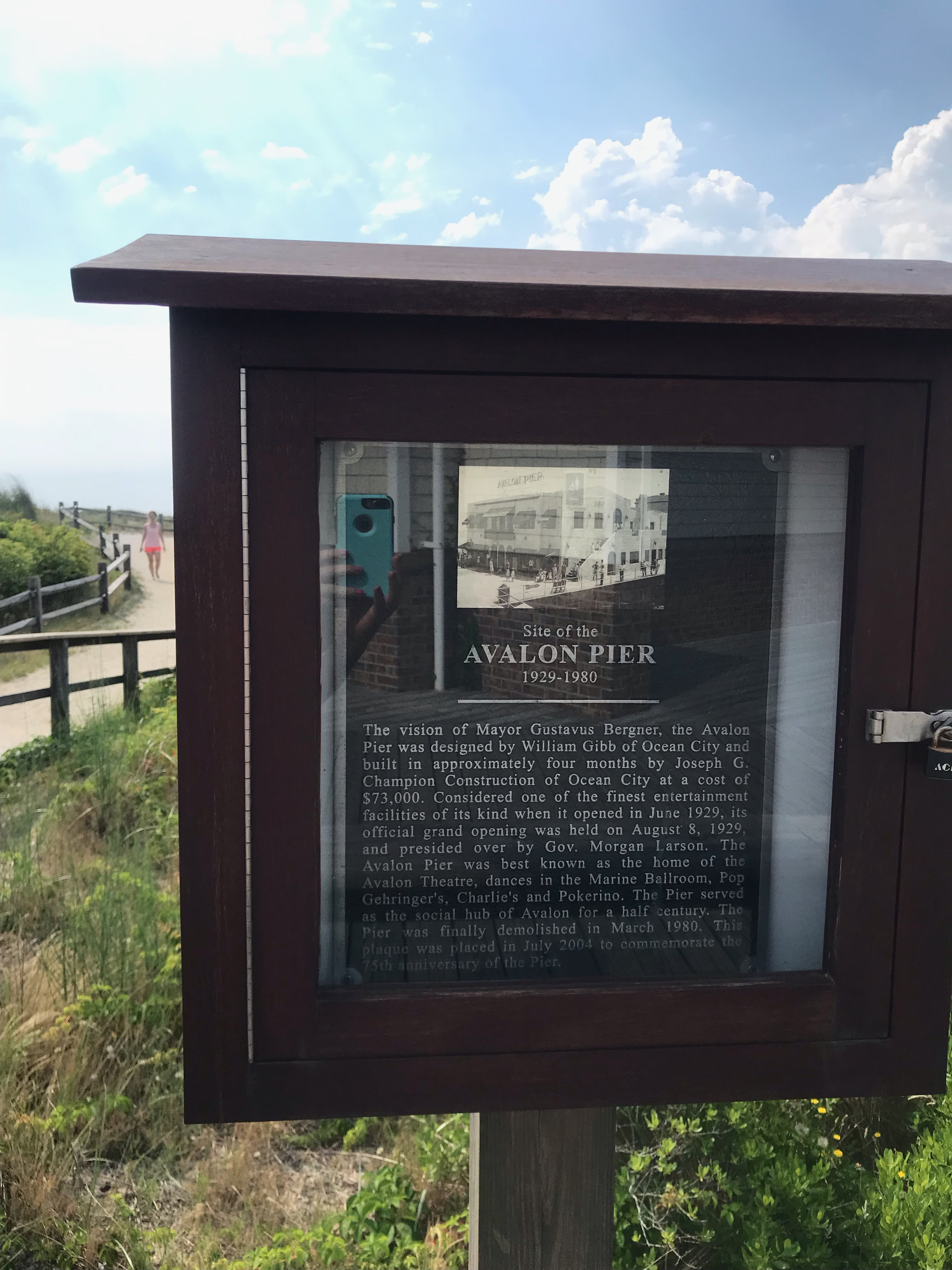
A plaque placed in July 2004, recognizing the “Site of the Avalon Pier 1929-1980”.

By the early 1900s, the Leaming Railroad bridge was constructed, allowing train connections into the town. This increased the traffic from nearby Philadelphia, Pennsylvania. Around 1944 the West Jersey and Seashore railroad lines merged with the Reading Railroad. This effectively ended the era of travel by train to the island. A hurricane took several streets and Avalon now has a north end beginning at 7th street. In the mid-1950s the Wolfington Family of Philadelphia purchased and operated the Puritan Hotel later enlarged and renamed the Whitebriar Hotel on the beach block at 21st Street. The Whitebriar was managed for two seasons in the mid-1950s, one of the future 'great hosts' of several hotels in the Greater Philadelphia area, Robert C. Bennett. He was the son of another 'famous' hotelier, Claude H. Bennett of the Bellevue Stratford Hotel in Philadelphia. Currently the most widely used method of transportation to and from Avalon is by car or boat; however, buses run on a regular schedule all over the shore towns.

== Geography ==
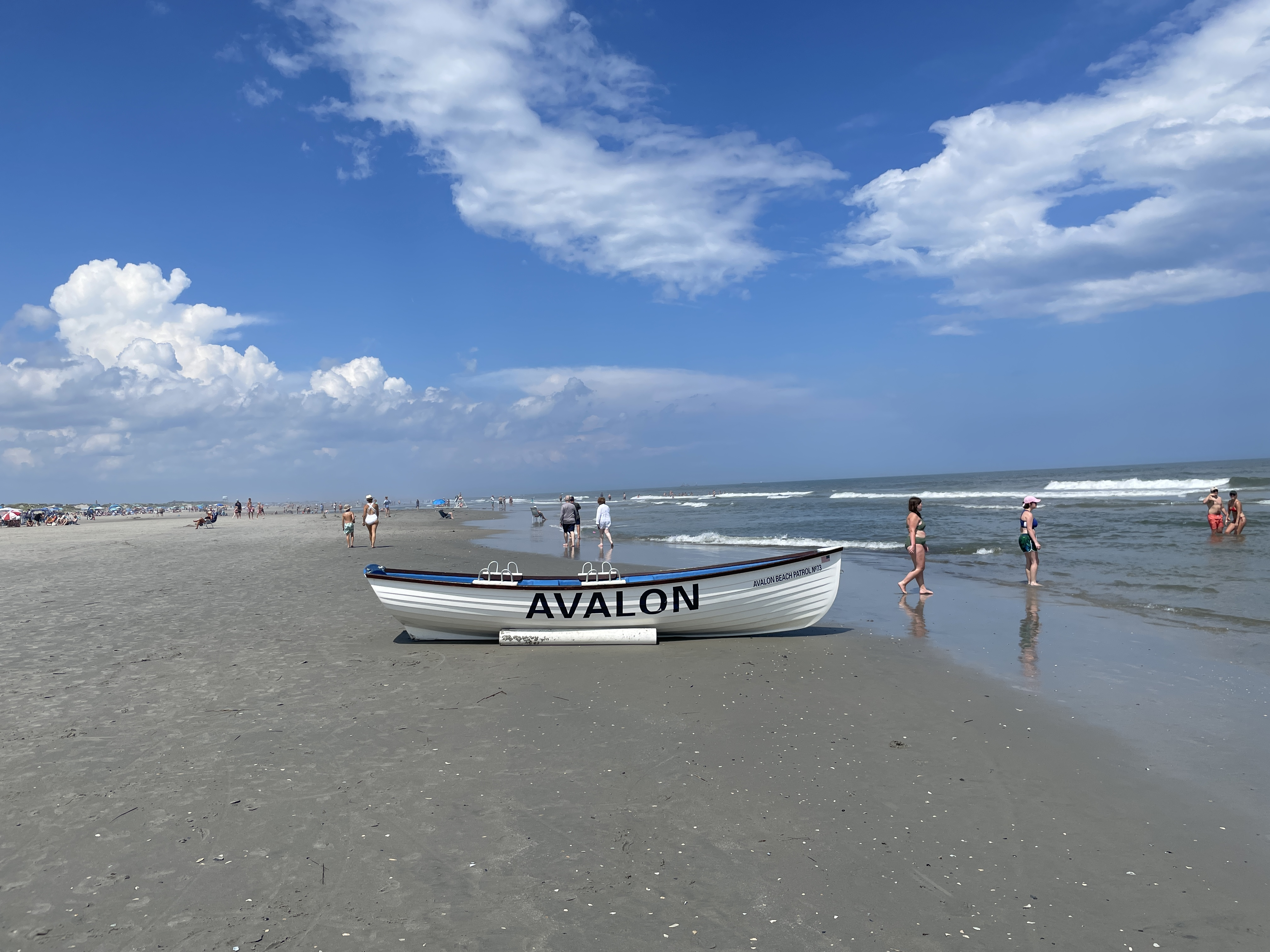
Avalon beach at 78th Street

According to the U.S. Census Bureau, the borough had a total area of 5.06 square miles (13.09 km^{2}), including 4.27 square miles (11.06 km^{2}) of land and 0.79 square miles (2.04 km^{2}) of water (15.53%).

Unincorporated communities, localities and place names located partially or completely within the borough include Peermont.

The borough borders the Cape May County municipalities of Dennis Township, Middle Township, Sea Isle City and Stone Harbor, as well as the Atlantic Ocean.

== Demographics ==
Historical population
Census	Pop.	Note	%±
1900	93		—
1910	230		147.3%
1920	197		−14.3%
1930	343		74.1%
1940	313		−8.7%
1950	428		36.7%
1960	695		62.4%
1970	1,283		84.6%
1980	2,162		68.5%
1990	1,809		−16.3%
2000	2,143		18.5%
2010	1,334		−37.8%
2020	1,243		−6.8%
2023 (est.)	1,218	▼	−2.0%
Population sources: 1900–2000 1900–1920; 1900–1910 1910–1930; 1940–2000; 2010 2020

=== 2010 census ===
The 2010 United States census counted 1,334 people, 692 households, and 416 families in the borough. The population density was 321.3 per square mile (124.1/km^{2}). There were 5,434 housing units at an average density of 1,308.8 per square mile (505.3/km^{2}). The racial makeup was 98.05% (1,308) White, 0.30% (4) Black or African American, 0.30% (4) Native American, 0.22% (3) Asian, 0.00% (0) Pacific Islander, 0.15% (2) from other races, and 0.97% (13) from two or more races. Hispanic or Latino of any race were 2.17% (29) of the population.

Of the 692 households, 9.2% had children under the age of 18; 54.6% were married couples living together; 4.8% had a female householder with no husband present and 39.9% were non-families. Of all households, 36.0% were made up of individuals and 21.1% had someone living alone who was 65 years of age or older. The average household size was 1.93 and the average family size was 2.45.

8.9% of the population were under the age of 18, 3.7% from 18 to 24, 11.8% from 25 to 44, 35.0% from 45 to 64, and 40.5% who were 65 years of age or older. The median age was 61.8 years. For every 100 females, the population had 89.8 males. For every 100 females ages 18 and older there were 89.5 males.

The Census Bureau's 2006–2010 American Community Survey showed that (in 2010 inflation-adjusted dollars) median household income was $88,527 (with a margin of error of +/− $20,202) and the median family income was $135,781 (+/− $32,487). Males had a median income of $162,125 (+/− $69,973) versus $46,397 (+/− $17,278) for females. The per capita income for the borough was $99,655 (+/− $18,059). About 1.6% of families and 4.3% of the population were below the poverty line, including 3.1% of those under age 18 and 1.8% of those age 65 or over.

=== 2000 census ===
As of the 2000 United States census, there were 2,143 people, 1,045 households, and 668 families residing in the borough. The population density was 508.4 inhabitants per square mile (196.3/km^{2}). There were 5,281 housing units at an average density of 1,252.9 per square mile (483.7/km^{2}). The racial makeup of the borough was 98.69% White, 0.14% African American, 0.56% Asian, 0.05% Pacific Islander, 0.05% from other races, and 0.51% from two or more races. Hispanic or Latino of any race were 0.56% of the population.

There were 1,045 households, out of which 12.9% had children under the age of 18 living with them, 56.7% were married couples living together, 5.5% had a female householder with no husband present, and 36.0% were non-families. 33.4% of all households were made up of individuals, and 17.8% had someone living alone who was 65 years of age or older. The average household size was 2.05 and the average family size was 2.56.

In the borough the population was spread out, with 14.1% under the age of 18, 2.9% from 18 to 24, 16.3% from 25 to 44, 33.9% from 45 to 64, and 32.7% who were 65 years of age or older. The median age was 56 years. For every 100 females, there were 94.8 males. For every 100 females age 18 and over, there were 91.0 males.

The median income for a household in the borough was $59,196, and the median income for a family was $72,750. Males had a median income of $60,227 versus $39,886 for females. The per capita income for the borough was $50,016. About 2.2% of families and 4.3% of the population were below the poverty line, including 9.6% of those under age 18 and 0.1% of those age 65 or over.

== Government ==
=== Local government ===
The Borough of Avalon is governed within the Faulkner Act, formally known as the Optional Municipal Charter Law, under the Mayor-Council system of municipal government. The borough is one of 71 municipalities (of the 564) statewide that use this form of government. The governing body is comprised of the mayor and the five-member borough council. Members of the borough council are elected in non-partisan elections to four-year terms on a staggered basis, with either two seats (and the mayoral seat) or three seats coming up for election in odd-numbered years as part of the May municipal election.

As of 2026, Avalon's mayor is John M. McCorristin, whose term of office ends on June 30, 2027. Members of the borough council are Council President Greg "Chet" Johnson (2029), Council Vice President Samuel D. Wierman (2027), Maura H. "Mari" Coskey (2029), Barbara L. Juzaitis (2027) and James T. McDermott Jr. (2029).

In July 2023, the borough council appointed Chet Johnson to fill the council seat expiring in June 2025 that had been held by John McCorristin until he stepped down to take office as mayor.

In July 2015, William G. Burns Jr., was appointed to fill the vacant seat expiring 2017 of David Ellenberg, who resigned from office earlier that month.

Mayor Pagliughi and Councilmembers Covington and Dean ran unopposed in the May 2011 municipal election. With 245 of 1,330 registered voters participating (turnout of 18.42%) all three candidates were re-elected.

In the May 2013 election, incumbents Ellenberg and Hudanich were re-elected, as newcomer John McCorristin won the seat that had previously been held by Joseph Tipping who didn't run for another term of office.

=== Federal, state, and county representation ===
Avalon is located in the 2nd Congressional district and is part of New Jersey's 1st state legislative district.

For the 119th United States Congress, New Jersey's 2nd congressional district is represented by Jeff Van Drew (R, Dennis Township). New Jersey is represented in the United States Senate by Democrats Cory Booker (Newark, term ends 2027) and Andy Kim (Moorestown, term ends 2031).

For the 2026–2027 session, the 1st legislative district of the New Jersey Legislature is represented in the State Senate by Mike Testa (R, Vineland) and in the General Assembly by Antwan McClellan (R, Ocean City) and Erik K. Simonsen (R, Lower Township).

Cape May County is governed by a five-person Board of County Commissioners whose members are elected at-large on a partisan basis to three-year terms of office on a staggered basis, with either one or two seats coming up for election each year; At an annual reorganization held each January, the commissioners select one member to serve as director and another to serve as vice-director. As of 2026, Cape May County's Commissioners are Director Leonard C. Desiderio (R, Sea Isle City, term as commissioner ends December 31, 2027; term as director ends 2026), Vice-Director Andrew Bulakowski (R, Lower Township; term as commissioner ends 2028; term as vice-director ends 2026). Robert Barr (R, Ocean City; 2028) and Will Morey (R, Wildwood Crest; 2026), with one seat expiring in December 2026 vacant after Melanie Collette resigned from office in March 2026. The county's constitutional officers are Clerk Rita Marie Rothberg (R, Ocean City; 2030), Sheriff Robert Nolan (R, Lower Township; 2026) and Surrogate E. Marie Hayes (R, Ocean City; 2028).

=== Politics ===
As of March 2011, there were a total of 1,307 registered voters in Avalon, of which 206 (15.8%) were registered as Democrats, 676 (51.7%) were registered as Republicans and 425 (32.5%) were registered as Unaffiliated. There were no voters registered to other parties.

Gubernatorial election results for Avalon
Year	Republican		Democratic		Third party(ies)	
Year	No.	%	No.	%	No.	%
2025	427	58.98%	293	40.47%	4	0.55%
2021	437	62.97%	253	36.46%	4	0.58%
2017	386	65.09%	200	33.73%	7	1.18%
2013	587	83.98%	107	15.31%	5	0.72%
2009	457	61.26%	245	32.84%	44	5.90%
2005	465	62.42%	260	34.90%	20	2.68%

In the 2012 presidential election, Republican Mitt Romney received 66.5% of the vote (622 cast), ahead of Democrat Barack Obama with 32.9% (308 votes), and other candidates with 0.6% (6 votes), among the 943 ballots cast by the borough's 1,331 registered voters (7 ballots were spoiled), for a turnout of 70.8%. In the 2008 presidential election, Republican John McCain received 62.4% of the vote (663 cast), ahead of Democrat Barack Obama, who received 35.7% (379 votes), with 1,063 ballots cast among the borough's 1,325 registered voters, for a turnout of 80.2%. In the 2004 presidential election, Republican George W. Bush received 66.1% of the vote (766 ballots cast), outpolling Democrat John Kerry, who received around 32.6% (377 votes), with 1,158 ballots cast among the borough's 1,419 registered voters, for a turnout percentage of 81.6.

Presidential elections results
Year	Republican	Democratic
2024	52.2% 451	45.7% 395
2020	58.0% 547	41.2% 388
2016	59.0% 511	37.5% 325
2012	66.5% 622	32.9% 308
2008	62.4% 663	35.7% 379
2004	66.1% 766	32.6% 377

In the 2013 gubernatorial election, Republican Chris Christie received 84.0% of the vote (589 cast), ahead of Democrat Barbara Buono with 15.3% (107 votes), and other candidates with 0.7% (5 votes), among the 710 ballots cast by the borough's 1,279 registered voters (9 ballots were spoiled), for a turnout of 55.5%. In the 2009 gubernatorial election, Republican Chris Christie received 64.7% of the vote (547 ballots cast), ahead of both Democrat Jon Corzine with 29.0% (245 votes) and Independent Chris Daggett with 5.0% (42 votes), with 845 ballots cast among the borough's 1,357 registered voters, yielding a 62.3% turnout.

United States Senate election results for Avalon1
Year	Republican		Democratic		Third party(ies)	
Year	No.	%	No.	%	No.	%
2024	470	56.29%	361	43.23%	4	0.48%
2018	511	68.87%	220	29.65%	11	1.48%
2012	592	66.67%	290	32.66%	6	0.68%
2006	541	65.82%	257	31.27%	24	2.92%

United States Senate election results for Avalon2
Year	Republican		Democratic		Third party(ies)	
Year	No.	%	No.	%	No.	%
2020	570	61.56%	351	37.90%	5	0.54%
2014	401	65.42%	206	33.61%	6	0.98%
2013	318	66.53%	155	32.43%	5	1.05%
2008	674	68.50%	300	30.49%	10	1.02%

== Education ==
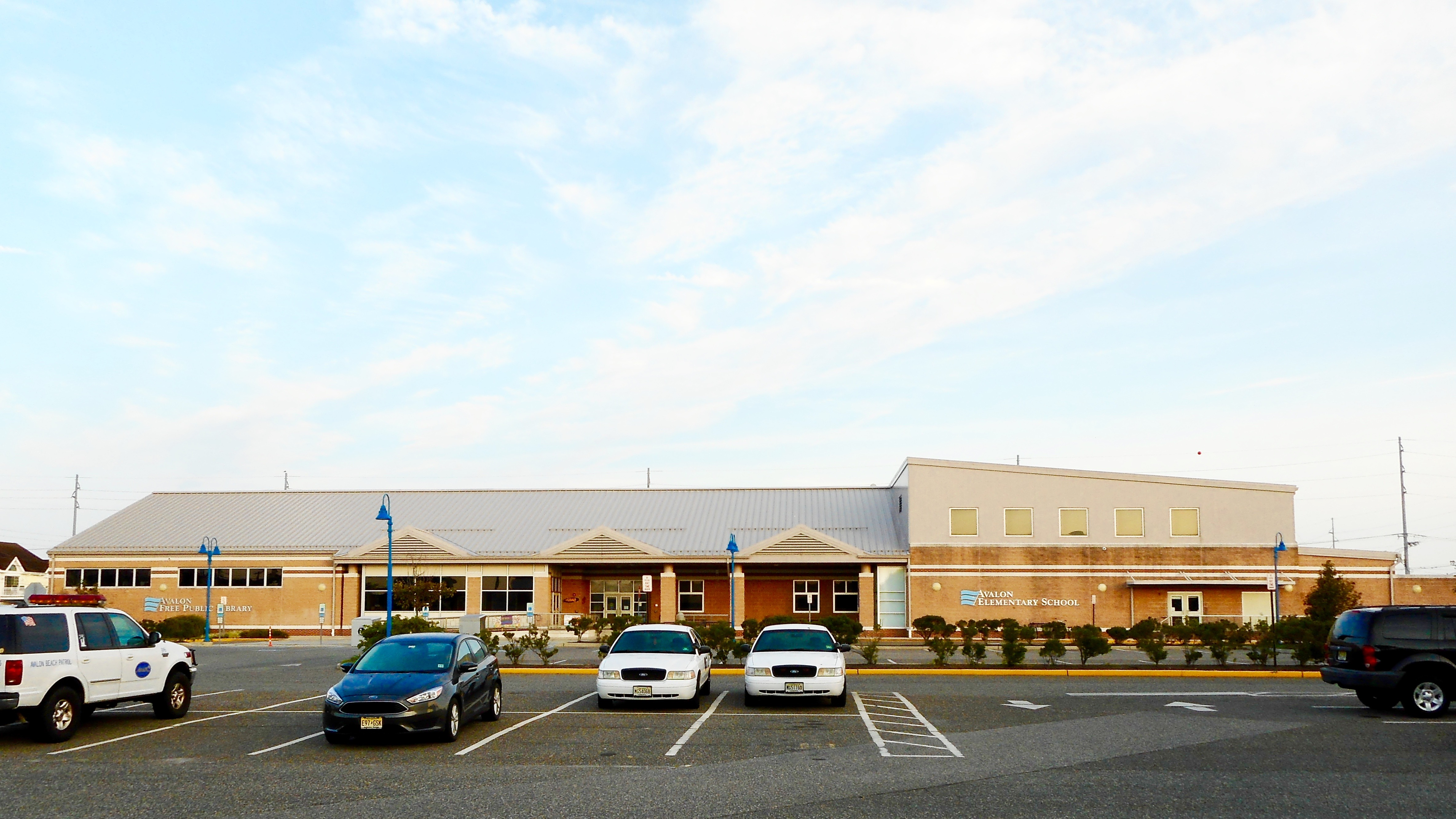
Avalon Elementary School and Avalon Free Public Library

Avalon School District is a public school district that serves students in public school for first through eighth grade. As of the 2022–23 school year, the district, comprised of one school, had an enrollment of 83 students and 12.2 classroom teachers (on an FTE basis), for a student–teacher ratio of 6.8:1. In the 2016–17 school year, Avalon had the smallest enrollment of any school district in the state, with 43 students.

Starting with the 2011–12 school year, in an agreement with the Stone Harbor School District, public school students in grades K–4 from both communities attend school in Stone Harbor while all students in grades 5–8 attend school in Avalon, at Avalon Elementary School.

Students in public school for ninth through twelfth grades attend Middle Township High School in Cape May Court House, as part of a sending/receiving relationship with the Middle Township Public Schools, together with students from Dennis Township, Stone Harbor and Woodbine. As of the 2022–23 school year, the high school had an enrollment of 790 students and 65.0 classroom teachers (on an FTE basis), for a student–teacher ratio of 12.2:1. Students are also eligible to attend Cape May County Technical High School in the Cape May Court House area, which serves students from the entire county in its comprehensive and vocational programs, which are offered without charge to students who are county residents. Special needs students may be referred to Cape May County Special Services School District in the Cape May Court House area.

The Roman Catholic Diocese of Camden operates Bishop McHugh Regional School, a Catholic K–8 school, in Ocean View, Dennis Township, which has a Cape May Courthouse postal address. It is the parish school of Avalon/Stone Harbor Catholic Church and three other churches.

== Transportation ==
=== Roads and highways ===
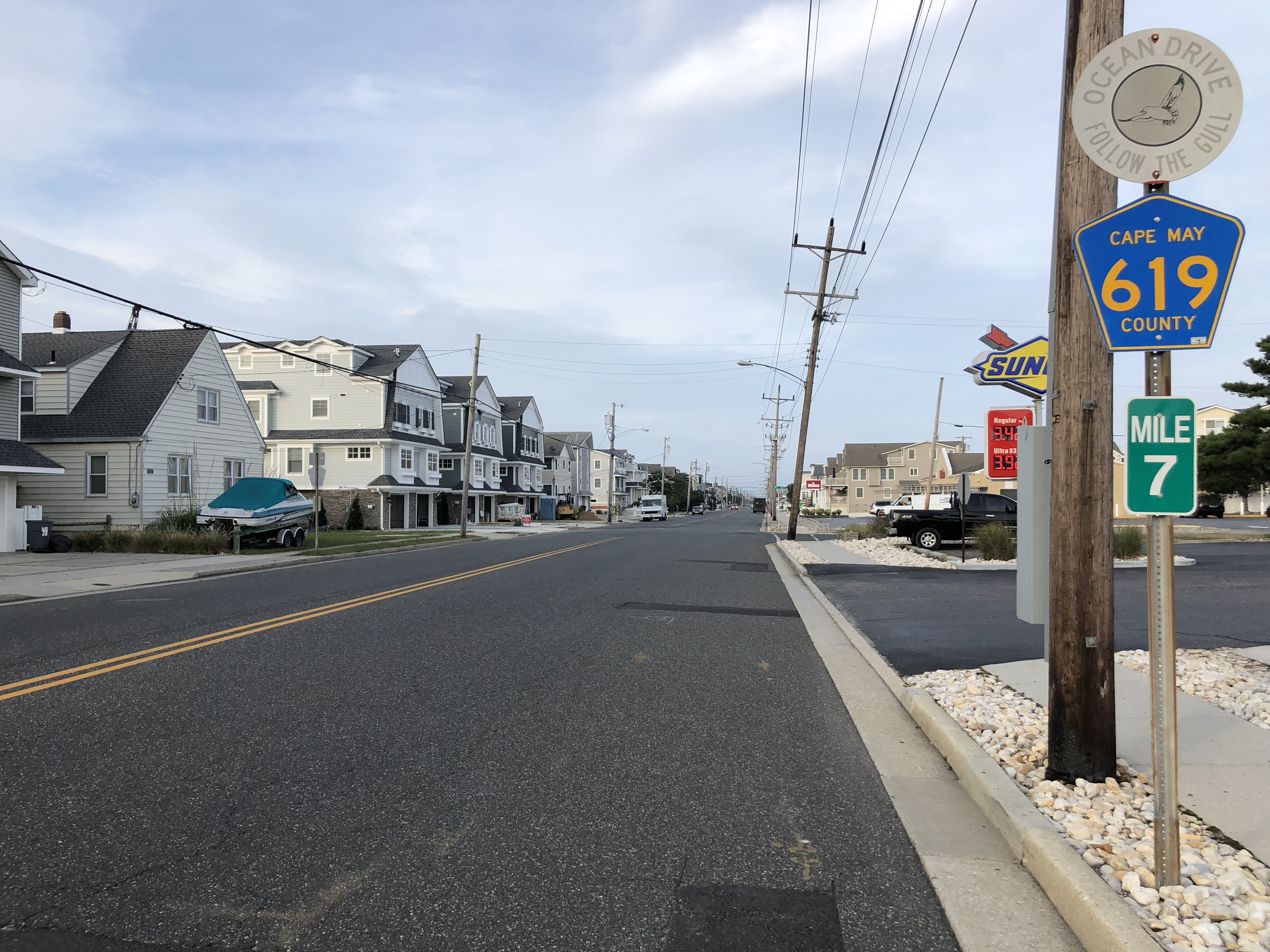
County Route 619 in Avalon

As of May 2010, the borough had a total of 41.61 miles (66.96 km) of roadways, of which 36.19 miles (58.24 km) were maintained by the municipality and 5.42 miles (8.72 km) by Cape May County.

No Interstate, U.S., state or major county highways serve Avalon. The most significant roads are minor county routes, such as County Route 601 (Avalon Boulevard), which connects the Garden State Parkway and U.S. Route 9 to the oceanfront, and County Route 619, which follows Ocean Drive.

=== Public transportation ===
There is also a seasonal trolley service that runs through the seven-mile-long island. Avalon also has multiple NJ Transit bus stops, and is served by the 315 to and from Philadelphia and the 319 that provides service to and from the Port Authority Bus Terminal in Midtown Manhattan.

== Climate ==
According to the Köppen climate classification system, Avalon has a Humid subtropical climate (Cfa).

Climate data for Avalon (39.1004, -74.7186), Elevation 7 ft (2 m), 1991–2020 normals, extremes 1981–2022
Month	Jan	Feb	Mar	Apr	May	Jun	Jul	Aug	Sep	Oct	Nov	Dec	Year
Record high °F (°C)	70.7 (21.5)	73.6 (23.1)	87.4 (30.8)	88.9 (31.6)	91.0 (32.8)	96.1 (35.6)	97.4 (36.3)	96.1 (35.6)	97.4 (36.3)	91.3 (32.9)	79.9 (26.6)	74.5 (23.6)	97.4 (36.3)
Mean daily maximum °F (°C)	42.9 (6.1)	44.3 (6.8)	50.3 (10.2)	60.3 (15.7)	69.6 (20.9)	78.6 (25.9)	83.9 (28.8)	82.6 (28.1)	77.2 (25.1)	66.9 (19.4)	56.2 (13.4)	47.8 (8.8)	63.5 (17.5)
Mean daily minimum °F (°C)	27.8 (−2.3)	28.9 (−1.7)	35.2 (1.8)	44.8 (7.1)	54.1 (12.3)	63.5 (17.5)	69.3 (20.7)	68.1 (20.1)	62.0 (16.7)	50.5 (10.3)	40.3 (4.6)	32.7 (0.4)	48.2 (9.0)
Record low °F (°C)	−3.8 (−19.9)	2.0 (−16.7)	10.3 (−12.1)	21.0 (−6.1)	36.2 (2.3)	45.3 (7.4)	51.2 (10.7)	47.0 (8.3)	40.5 (4.7)	30.8 (−0.7)	17.3 (−8.2)	3.3 (−15.9)	−3.8 (−19.9)
Average precipitation inches (mm)	3.40 (86)	2.97 (75)	4.40 (112)	3.50 (89)	3.45 (88)	3.62 (92)	4.21 (107)	4.45 (113)	3.77 (96)	4.27 (108)	3.34 (85)	4.24 (108)	45.63 (1,159)
Average snowfall inches (cm)	6.0 (15)	4.0 (10)	2.1 (5.3)	0.1 (0.25)	0.0 (0.0)	0.0 (0.0)	0.0 (0.0)	0.0 (0.0)	0.0 (0.0)	0.0 (0.0)	0.0 (0.0)	2.0 (5.1)	14.2 (36)
Average dew point °F (°C)	25.7 (−3.5)	26.5 (−3.1)	31.9 (−0.1)	41.1 (5.1)	52.1 (11.2)	62.1 (16.7)	67.2 (19.6)	66.7 (19.3)	61.0 (16.1)	49.9 (9.9)	38.8 (3.8)	31.4 (−0.3)	46.3 (7.9)
Source 1: PRISM
Source 2: NOHRSC (Snow, 2008/2009 - 2022/2023 normals)

=== The Nor'easter of 1962 ===
In March 1962, a major Nor'easter, the Ash Wednesday Storm of 1962, tore through the U.S. East Coast causing massive ocean swells. Much of Avalon suffered very serious flooding and major coastline loss. Much of the island was under water for four to five days, with damage to homes dependent on the foundation construction of the home and location on the island.

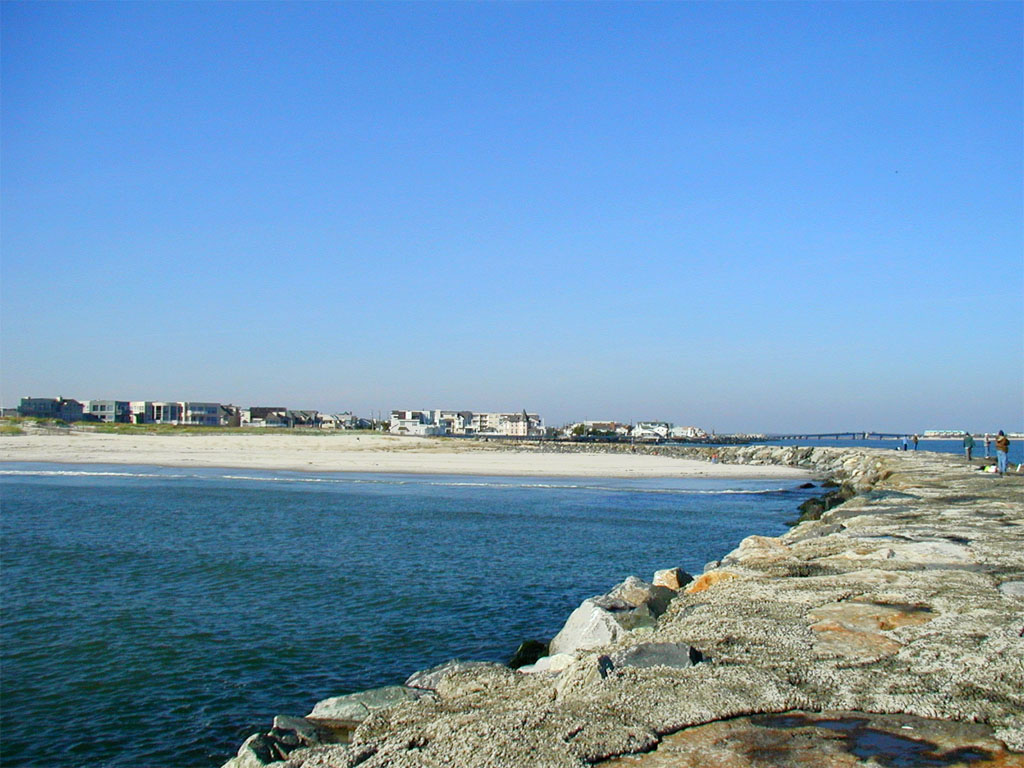
Rocks were erected where 8th Street meets Townsend's Inlet to hold back the ocean.

=== Protection efforts against storms ===
While there have been many strong storms since 1962, extensive rock jetty construction on Townsends Inlet (as recent as Summer 2006) has mostly succeeded in protecting the inlet-side homes. However, beaches and property facing the ocean at 8th through 12th Streets have struggled to prevent further loss of this barrier island through various anti-erosion schemes, including extending the 8th Street rock jetty, the installation of an artificial reef and the beach replenishment. So far, there has been no more "shrinkage" of the island at this location, but at a very high monetary cost. Several times, in 2015, the causeway leading north from Avalon to Townsends Inlet has been closed by flooding during stormy weather.

== Ecology ==
According to the A. W. Kuchler U.S. potential natural vegetation types, Avalon would have a dominant vegetation type of Northern Cordgrass (73) with a dominant vegetation form of Coastal Prairie (20).

== Notable people ==
People who were born in, residents of, or otherwise closely associated with Avalon include:

- Geno Auriemma (born 1954), head coach of the University of Connecticut Huskies women's basketball team
- Neil Hartman, Comcast Sportsnet personality
- Paul Holmgren (born 1955), former General Manager of the Philadelphia Flyers and current president
- Tim Kerr (born 1960), right winger who played in the NHL for the Philadelphia Flyers
- Ed McMahon (1923–2009), television show host
- Joe Paterno (1926–2012), Penn State football head coach
- Michael W. Rice (born 1943), CEO/Chairman of Utz Quality Foods
- Ed Stefanski, former General Manager of the Philadelphia 76ers

Preceded by Sea Isle City	Beaches of New Jersey	Succeeded by Stone Harbor
