= Avalon School District =

School district in Cape May County, New Jersey, US

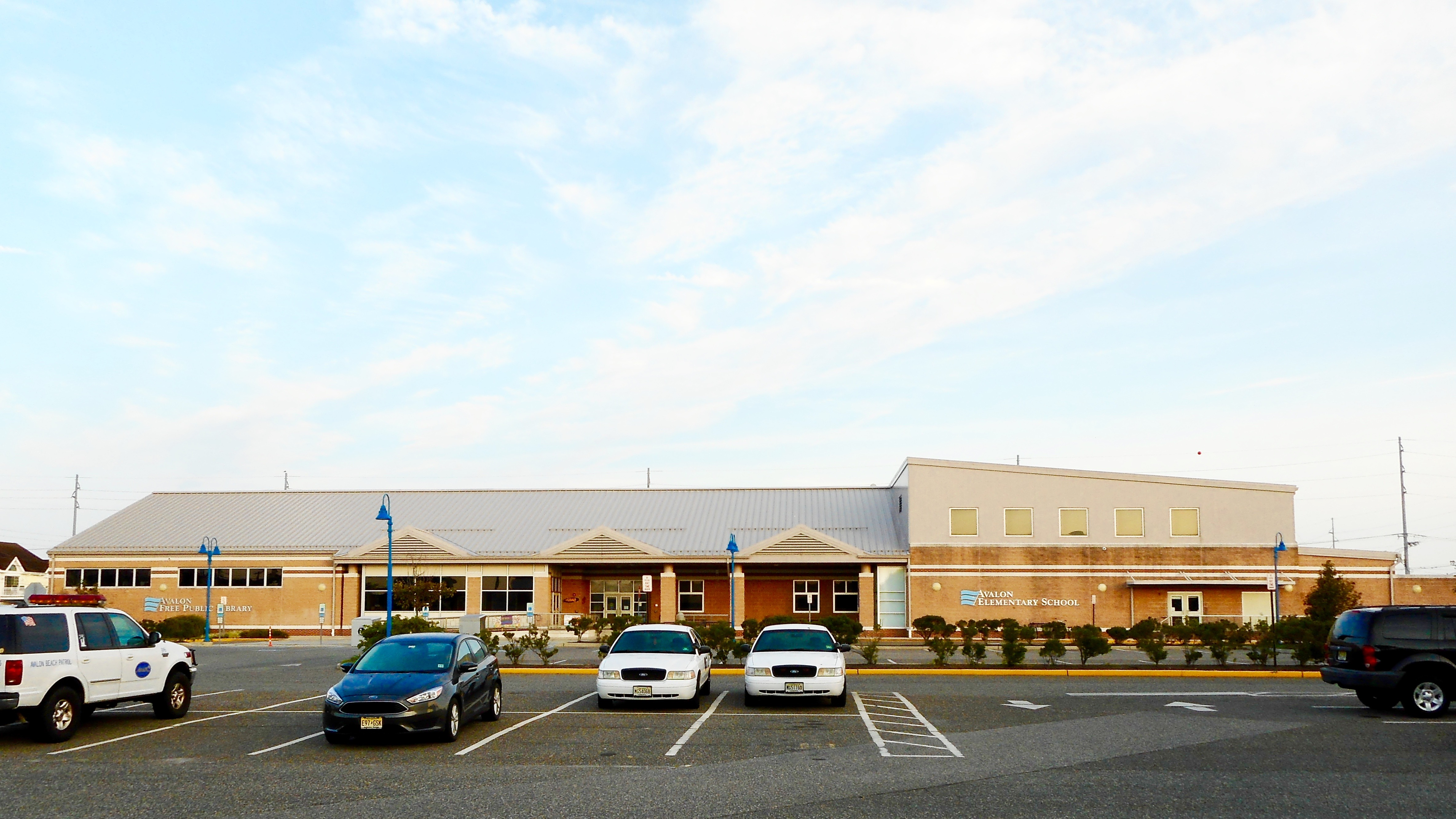
- Avalon Elementary School and Free Public Library

Address
- 235 32nd Street Avalon, Cape May County, New Jersey, 08202
- Coordinates: 39.095134°N 74.724706°W

District information
- Grades: PreK-8
- Superintendent: Kathleen Fox
- Business administrator: Linda Fiori
- Schools: 1

Students and staff
- Enrollment: 92 (as of 2023–24)
- Faculty: 11.4 FTEs
- Student–teacher ratio: 8.1:1

Other information
- District Factor Group: FG
- Website: www.avalonstoneharborschools.org
Ind.	Per pupil	District spending	Rank (*)	K-8 average	%± vs. average
1A	Total Spending	$43,775	71	$18,891	131.7%
1	Budgetary Cost	44,099	71	14,159	211.5%
2	Classroom Instruction	26,645	71	8,659	207.7%
6	Support Services	6,360	70	2,167	193.5%
8	Administrative Cost	1,834	55	1,547	18.6%
10	Operations & Maintenance	7,906	71	1,612	390.4%
13	Extracurricular Activities	493	67	104	374.0%
16	Median Teacher Salary	71,751	69	61,136
Data from NJDoE 2014 Taxpayers' Guide to Education Spending. *Of K-8 districts with up to 400 students. Lowest spending=1; Highest=71

Avalon School District is a community public school district that serves students in pre-kindergarten through eighth grade from Avalon, in the U.S. state of New Jersey. Based on data from the 2014 Taxpayers' Guide to Education Spending prepared by the New Jersey Department of Education, the Avalon district's total per pupil spending of $43,775 was the highest of any regular school district.

Starting with the 2011-12 school year, in an agreement with the Stone Harbor School District, public school students in grades K-4 from both communities attend school at Stone Harbor Elementary School in Stone Harbor while all students in PreK and in grades 5-8 attend school in Avalon as part of a reciprocal sending/receiving relationship.

As of the 2023–24 school year, the district, comprised of one school, had an enrollment of 92 students and 11.4 classroom teachers (on an FTE basis), for a student–teacher ratio of 8.1:1. In the 2016–17 school year, Avalon had the smallest enrollment of any school district in the state, with 43 students.

The district had been classified by the New Jersey Department of Education as being in District Factor Group "FG", the fourth-highest of eight groupings. District Factor Groups organize districts statewide to allow comparison by common socioeconomic characteristics of the local districts. From lowest socioeconomic status to highest, the categories are A, B, CD, DE, FG, GH, I and J.

Students in public school for ninth through twelfth grades attend Middle Township High School in Cape May Court House, as part of a sending/receiving relationship with the Middle Township Public Schools, together with students from Avalon, Dennis Township, Stone Harbor and Woodbine. As of the 2023–24 school year, the high school had an enrollment of 825 students and 66.0 classroom teachers (on an FTE basis), for a student–teacher ratio of 12.5:1.

== Operations ==
The Avalon and Stone Harbor school districts operate like a single school district and can move teachers between the two schools, even though they are legally two separate districts. In terms of their student populations both districts having among the lowest numbers in New Jersey. The student sharing agreement means the Avalon and Stone Harbor districts retain foreign language and extracurricular programs they would not otherwise have.

In 2017, Avalon School District was the New Jersey school district with the smallest student population.

== Schools ==
Avalon Elementary School had an enrollment of 92 students in the 2023–24 school year in PreK and grades 5-8.

The school has a ceramic kiln for its art room and an outdoor track which non-school individuals may use. It shares space with the Avalon Public Library. In 2016 the school had 60 students. About 40% of the combined Avalon and Stone Harbor students were from out of district and paid tuition, with many coming from the Cape May Courthouse area.

== Administration ==
Core members of the district's administration are:

- Kathleen Fox, superintendent
- Linda Fiori, business administrator and board secretary

== Board of education ==
The district's board of education, comprised of five members, sets policy and oversees the fiscal and educational operation of the district through its administration; a member from Stone Harbor represents that district on the Avalon board. As a Type II school district, the board's trustees are elected directly by voters to serve three-year terms of office on a staggered basis, with either one or two seats up for election each year held (since 2012) as part of the November general election. The board appoints a superintendent to oversee the district's day-to-day operations and a business administrator to supervise the business functions of the district.
