= Stone Harbor, New Jersey =

Borough in Cape May County, New Jersey, US

- Borough
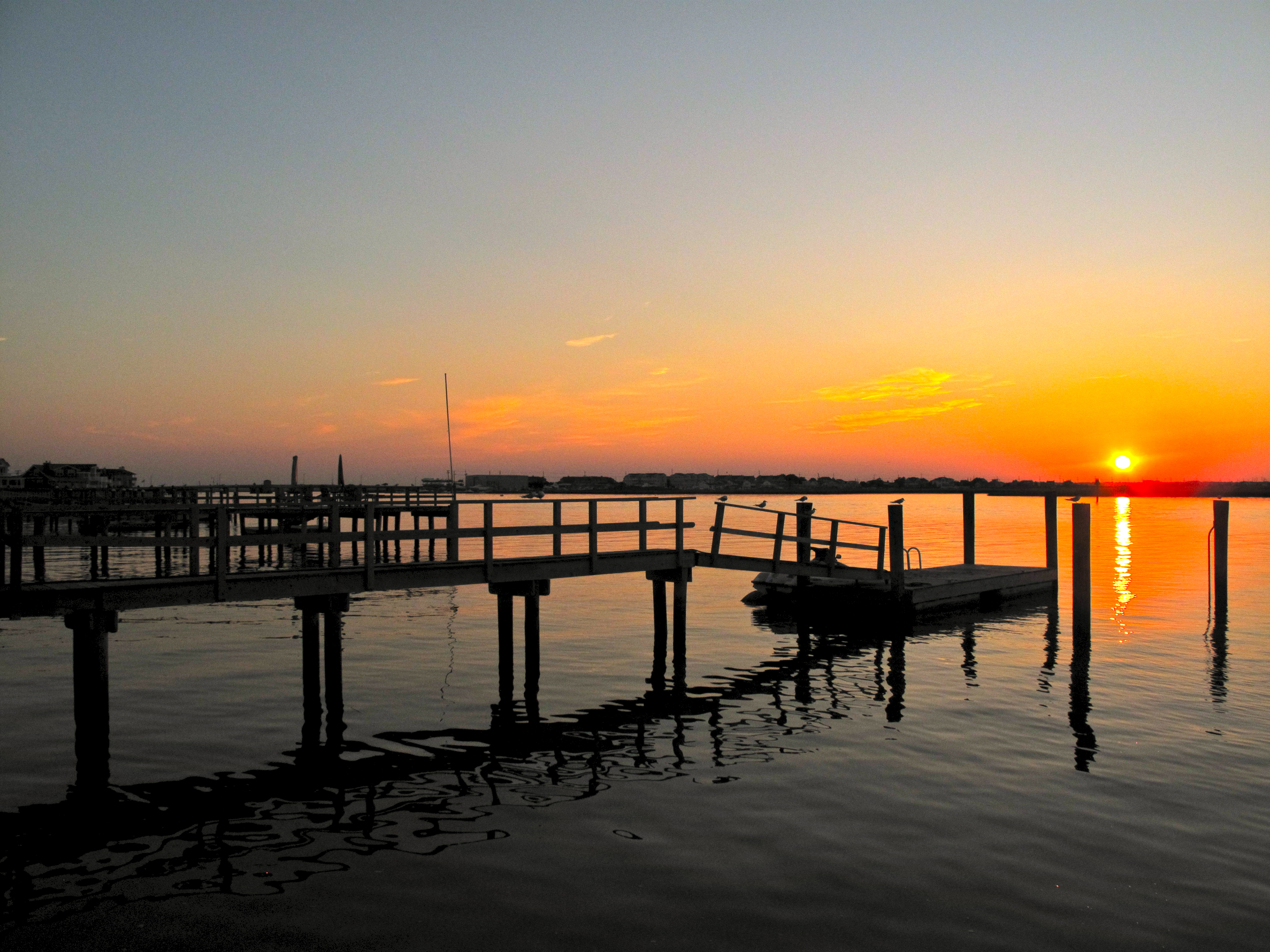
- Bayside Harbor sunset

- Seal
- Motto: "The Seashore at its Best"
- Location of Stone Harbor in Cape May County highlighted in red (left). Inset map: Location of Cape May County in New Jersey highlighted in orange (right).

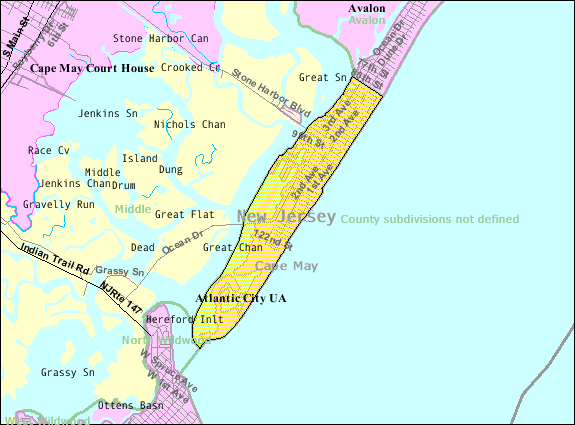
- Census Bureau map of Stone Harbor, New Jersey

- Location in Cape May County Location in New Jersey Location in the United States
- Coordinates: 39.041691°N 74.768837°W
- Country: United States
- State: New Jersey
- County: Cape May
- Incorporated: April 28, 1914

Government
  - Type: Borough
  - Body: Borough Council
  - Mayor: Timothy J. Carney (R, term ends December 31, 2028)
  - Administrator: Vacant
  - Municipal clerk: Emily Dillon

Area
  - Total: 2.19 sq mi (5.68 km^{2})
  - Land: 1.42 sq mi (3.68 km^{2})
  - Water: 0.78 sq mi (2.01 km^{2}) 35.34%
  - Rank: 394th of 565 in state 11th of 16 in county
- Elevation: 7 ft (2.1 m)

Population (2020)
  - Total: 796
  - Estimate (2023): 791
  - Rank: 541st of 565 in state 14th of 16 in county
  - Density: 560.7/sq mi (216.5/km^{2})
  - Rank: 435th of 565 in state 11th of 16 in county
- Time zone: UTC−05:00 (Eastern (EST))
  - Summer (DST): UTC−04:00 (Eastern (EDT))
- ZIP Code: 08247
- Area code: 609 Exchanges: 368, 967
- FIPS code: 3400971010
- GNIS feature ID: 0885410
- Website: www.stoneharbornj.org

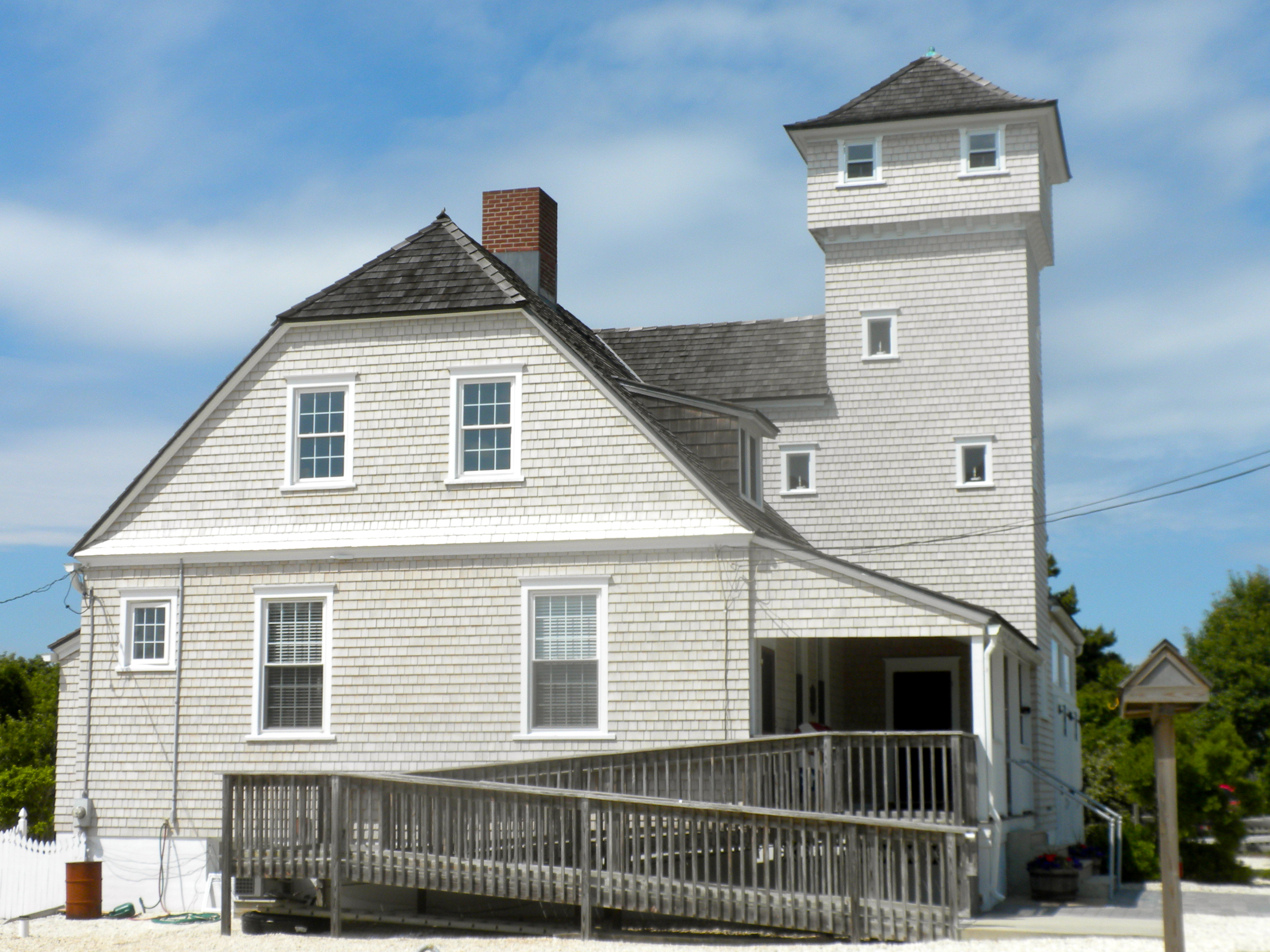
U.S. Life-Saving Station No. 35

Stone Harbor is a borough in Cape May County, in the U.S. state of New Jersey. The borough, and all of Cape May County, is part of the South Jersey region of the state and of the Ocean City metropolitan statistical area, which is part of the Philadelphia metropolitan area. It occupies the southern portion of Seven Mile Island together with its northern neighbor Avalon. It is a resort community that attracts visitors looking to enjoy its beaches, sailing facilities and commercial center. The community attracts a large number of vacationers from the Mid-Atlantic region and Quebec.

As of the 2020 United States census, the borough's population was 796, a decrease of 70 (−8.1%) from the 2010 census count of 866, which in turn had reflected a decline of 262 (−23.2%) from the 1,128 counted at the 2000 census. The borough has a summer population in excess of 20,000, who are generally wealthier than full-time residents.

The New York Times described Stone Harbor as a place of "gleaming McMansions and elegant shops", with an average single-family home selling for US$2.5 million in 2008. In 2017, Stone Harbor was the third-most expensive ZIP Code in New Jersey based on median home sale price, and had the second-most expensive residential real estate transaction in the state that year at $10 million. In 2014, Forbes magazine ranked Stone Harbor (ZIP Code 08247) at the 191st spot on its list of the most expensive ZIP Codes in the United States.

== History ==
Development began in the late 19th century as a beach resort along the West Jersey and Seashore Railroad line. The community was marketed to wealthy residents of Philadelphia seeking a resort destination for a second home.

Stone Harbor was incorporated as a borough by an act of the New Jersey Legislature on April 3, 1914, from portions of Middle Township, based on the results of a referendum held on April 28, 1914. The borough gained a portion of Avalon on December 27, 1941. The borough is said to be named for an English sea captain named Stone who sought shelter from a storm in the area.

In 2015, a contract was awarded to dredge adjacent bodies of water. In early 2016, during the dewatering stage of the operation, a total of three geotubes discharged a small quantity of sediment containing several contaminants. Dredging was halted pending development of a plan to prevent future such spills.

== Geography ==
According to the United States Census Bureau, the borough had a total area of 2.19 square miles (5.68 km^{2}), including 1.42 square miles (3.68 km^{2}) of land and 0.77 square miles (2.01 km^{2}) of water (35.34%).

Unincorporated communities, localities and place names located partially or completely within the borough include Seven Mile Beach.

Stone Harbor borders Avalon Borough, Middle Township, North Wildwood City and the Atlantic Ocean.

Stone Harbor Point, located at the southern end of the borough, is a protected coastal preserve encompassing beaches, dunes, tidal flats, and maritime forest. The area has been recognized as one of New Jersey's most significant habitats for migratory shorebirds and horseshoe crabs, providing nesting and stopover habitat for several state- and federally protected species.

== Demographics ==
Historical population
Census	Pop.	Note	%±
1920	159		—
1930	363		128.3%
1940	383		5.5%
1950	670		74.9%
1960	834		24.5%
1970	1,089		30.6%
1980	1,187		9.0%
1990	1,025		−13.6%
2000	1,128		10.0%
2010	866		−23.2%
2020	796		−8.1%
2023 (est.)	791	▼	−0.6%
Population sources: 1920–2000; 1920 1920–1930; 1940–2000 2000; 2010 2020

=== 2010 census ===
The 2010 United States census counted 866 people, 441 households, and 256 families in the borough. The population density was 619.6 per square mile (239.2/km^{2}). There were 3,247 housing units at an average density of 2,323.3 per square mile (897.0/km^{2}). The racial makeup was 97.11% (841) White, 1.62% (14) Black or African American, 0.00% (0) Native American, 0.12% (1) Asian, 0.00% (0) Pacific Islander, 0.69% (6) from other races, and 0.46% (4) from two or more races. Hispanic or Latino of any race were 3.35% (29) of the population.

Of the 441 households, 10.2% had children under the age of 18; 49.2% were married couples living together; 6.1% had a female householder with no husband present and 42.0% were non-families. Of all households, 37.4% were made up of individuals and 21.5% had someone living alone who was 65 years of age or older. The average household size was 1.96 and the average family size was 2.54.

10.9% of the population were under the age of 18, 4.4% from 18 to 24, 11.8% from 25 to 44, 31.4% from 45 to 64, and 41.6% who were 65 years of age or older. The median age was 60.6 years. For every 100 females, the population had 89.9 males. For every 100 females ages 18 and older there were 84.2 males.

The Census Bureau's 2006–2010 American Community Survey showed that (in 2010 inflation-adjusted dollars) median household income was $69,286 (with a margin of error of +/− $8,969) and the median family income was $92,083 (+/− $19,643). Males had a median income of $55,417 (+/− $23,166) versus $70,208 (+/− $15,479) for females. The per capita income for the borough was $60,057 (+/− $10,700). About 2.8% of families and 5.2% of the population were below the poverty line, including 14.4% of those under age 18 and 2.8% of those age 65 or over.

=== 2000 census ===
As of the 2000 United States census there were 1,128 people, 596 households, and 330 families residing in the borough. The population density was 796.1 inhabitants per square mile (307.4/km^{2}). There were 3,428 housing units at an average density of 2,419.4 per square mile (934.1/km^{2}). The racial makeup of the borough was 98.76% White, 0.80% African American, 0.18% from other races, and 0.27% from two or more races. Hispanic or Latino of any race were 0.44% of the population.

There were 596 households, out of which 11.4% had children under the age of 18 living with them, 48.5% were married couples living together, 5.2% had a female householder with no husband present, and 44.5% were non-families. 40.3% of all households were made up of individuals, and 24.3% had someone living alone who was 65 years of age or older. The average household size was 1.89 and the average family size was 2.50.

In the borough the population was spread out, with 12.3% under the age of 18, 3.0% from 18 to 24, 14.4% from 25 to 44, 31.6% from 45 to 64, and 38.7% who were 65 years of age or older. The median age was 58 years. For every 100 females, there were 84.9 males. For every 100 females age 18 and over, there were 82.1 males.

The median income for a household in the borough was $51,471, and the median income for a family was $67,250. Males had a median income of $52,500 versus $35,000 for females. The per capita income for the borough was $46,427. About 1.5% of families and 3.5% of the population were below the poverty line, including 6.3% of those under age 18 and 2.5% of those age 65 or over.

== Government ==
=== Local government ===
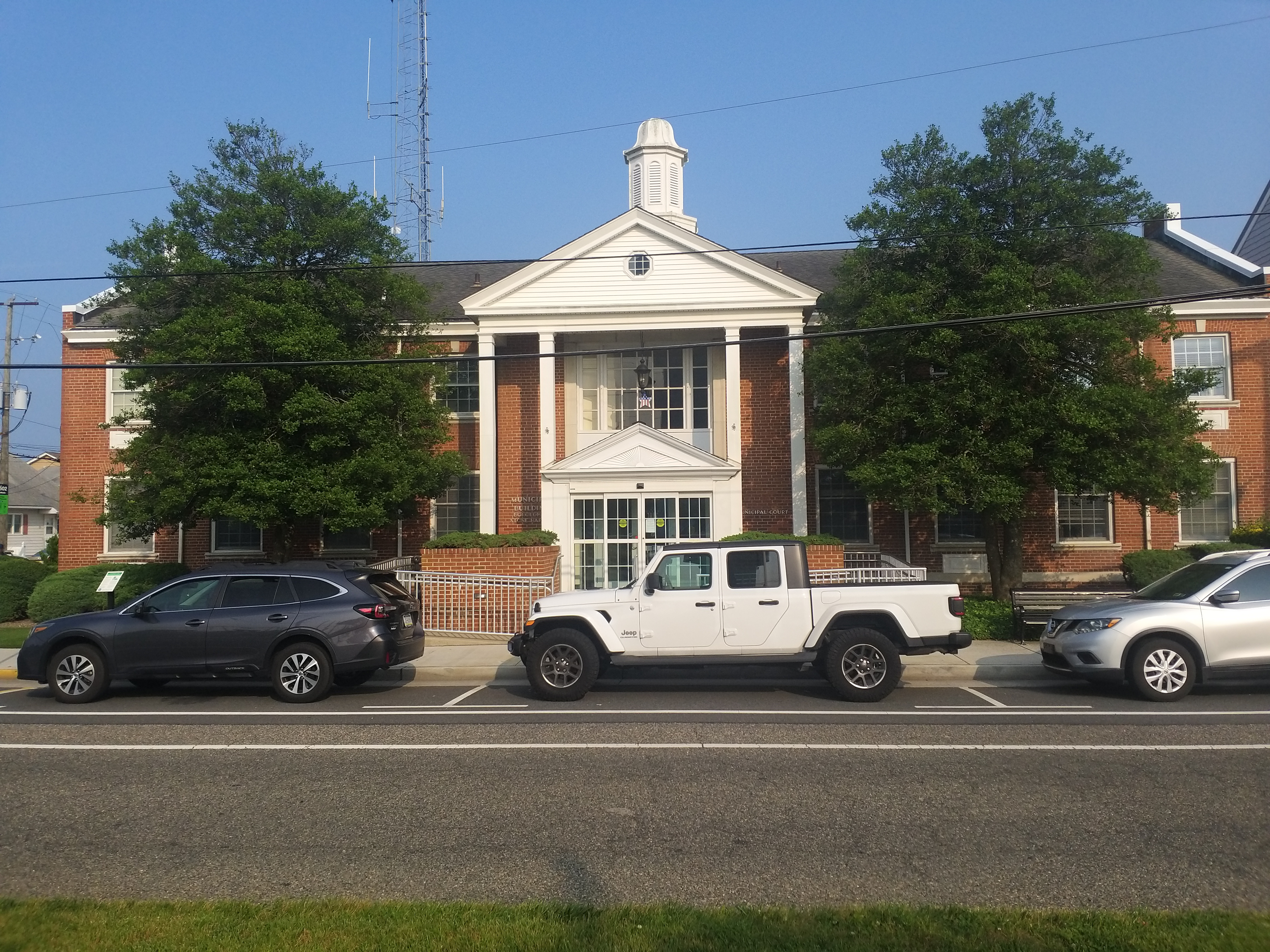
Borough Hall

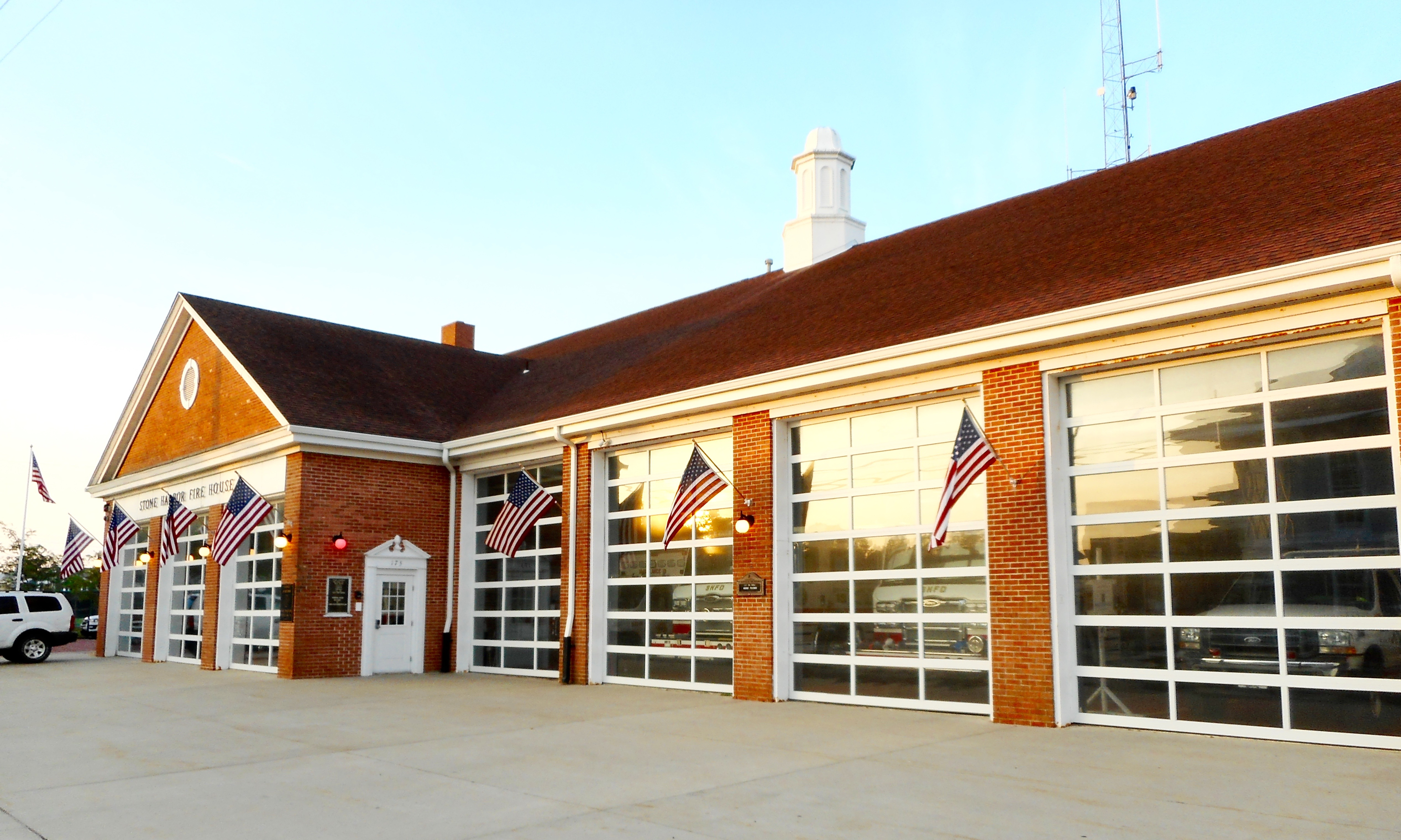
Firehouse

Stone Harbor is governed under the borough form of New Jersey municipal government, which is used in 218 municipalities (of the 564) statewide, making it the most common form of government in New Jersey. The governing body is comprised of a mayor and a borough council, with all positions elected at-large on a partisan basis as part of the November general election. A mayor is elected directly by the voters to a four-year term of office. The borough council includes six members elected to serve three-year terms on a staggered basis, with two seats coming up for election each year in a three-year cycle. The borough form of government used by Stone Harbor is a "weak mayor / strong council" government in which council members act as the legislative body with the mayor presiding at meetings and voting only in the event of a tie. The mayor can veto ordinances subject to an override by a two-thirds majority vote of the council. The mayor makes committee and liaison assignments for council members, and most appointments are made by the mayor with the advice and consent of the council.

As of 2025, the mayor of Stone Harbor Borough is Republican Timothy J. Carney, whose term of office ends December 31, 2028. Members of the Stone Harbor Borough Council are Council President Jennifer B. Gensemer (R, 2025), Ken Biddick (R, 2025), Robin Lynn Casper (R, 2023), Francis J. "Frank" Dallahan (R, 2027), Victor Foschini (I, 2025) and Bernadette "Bunny" Parzych (R, 2027).

In June 2019, Frank Dallahan was selected from a list of three candidates nominated by the Republican municipal committee to fill the seat expiring in December 2021 that was vacated by Robert Levins when he resigned from office due to health issues; Dallahan served on an interim basis until the November 2019 general election, when he was elected to serve the balance of the term of office.

In November 2018, the council selected Reese Moore from a list of three candidates nominated by the Republican municipal committee to fill the seat expiring in December 2020 that was vacated the previous month following the resignation of Council President Karen Lane; Moore served on an interim basis until the November 2019 general election, when she was elected to serve the remainder of the term.

In 2018, the borough had an average property tax bill of $8,615, the highest in the county, compared to an average bill of $8,767 statewide.

=== Federal, state and county representation ===
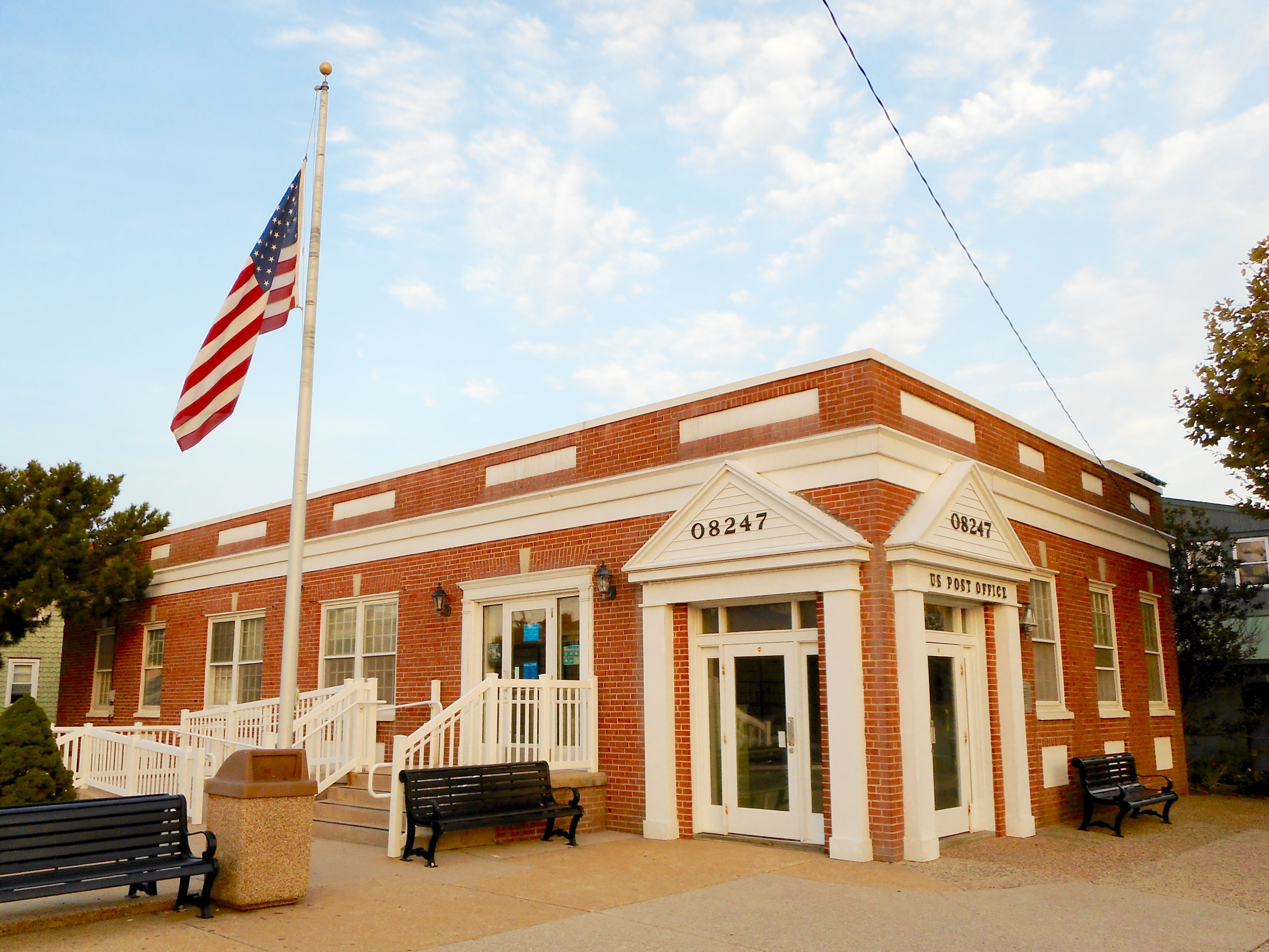
Post office

Stone Harbor is located in the 2nd Congressional District and is part of New Jersey's 1st state legislative district.

For the 119th United States Congress, New Jersey's 2nd congressional district is represented by Jeff Van Drew (R, Dennis Township). New Jersey is represented in the United States Senate by Democrats Cory Booker (Newark, term ends 2027) and Andy Kim (Moorestown, term ends 2031).

For the 2026–2027 session, the 1st legislative district of the New Jersey Legislature is represented in the State Senate by Mike Testa (R, Vineland) and in the General Assembly by Antwan McClellan (R, Ocean City) and Erik K. Simonsen (R, Lower Township).

Cape May County is governed by a five-person Board of County Commissioners whose members are elected at-large on a partisan basis to three-year terms of office on a staggered basis, with either one or two seats coming up for election each year; At an annual reorganization held each January, the commissioners select one member to serve as director and another to serve as vice-director. As of 2026, Cape May County's Commissioners are Director Leonard C. Desiderio (R, Sea Isle City, term as commissioner ends December 31, 2027; term as director ends 2026), Vice-Director Andrew Bulakowski (R, Lower Township; term as commissioner ends 2028; term as vice-director ends 2026). Robert Barr (R, Ocean City; 2028) and Will Morey (R, Wildwood Crest; 2026), with one seat expiring in December 2026 vacant after Melanie Collette resigned from office in March 2026. The county's constitutional officers are Clerk Rita Marie Rothberg (R, Ocean City; 2030), Sheriff Robert Nolan (R, Lower Township; 2026) and Surrogate E. Marie Hayes (R, Ocean City; 2028).

=== Politics ===
As of March 23, 2011, there were a total of 778 registered voters in Stone Harbor, of which 62 (8.0%) were registered as Democrats, 588 (75.6%) were registered as Republicans and 128 (16.5%) were registered as Unaffiliated. There were no voters registered to other parties.

Gubernatorial election results for Stone Harbor
Year	Republican		Democratic		Third party(ies)	
Year	No.	%	No.	%	No.	%
2025	237	53.62%	203	45.93%	2	0.45%
2021	242	59.90%	161	39.85%	1	0.25%
2017	228	64.04%	126	35.39%	2	0.56%
2013	324	82.65%	62	15.82%	6	1.53%
2009	349	63.45%	172	31.27%	29	5.27%
2005	402	69.07%	168	28.87%	12	2.06%

In 2016, Republican Donald Trump received 59.3% of the vote (296 votes) vs. Hillary Clinton's 37.5% (187 votes) with other candidates taking 3.2% (16 votes). In the 2012 presidential election, Republican Mitt Romney received 64.8% of the vote (411 cast), ahead of Democrat Barack Obama with 34.1% (216 votes), and other candidates with 1.1% (7 votes), among the 640 ballots cast by the borough's 782 registered voters (6 ballots were spoiled), for a turnout of 81.8%. In the 2008 presidential election, Republican John McCain received 62.7% of the vote (416 cast), ahead of Democrat Barack Obama, who received 36.1% (240 votes), with 664 ballots cast among the borough's 801 registered voters, for a turnout of 82.9%. In the 2004 presidential election, Republican George W. Bush received 69.6% of the vote (519 ballots cast), outpolling Democrat John Kerry, who received around 29.1% (217 votes), with 746 ballots cast among the borough's 920 registered voters, for a turnout percentage of 81.1.

Presidential elections results
Year	Republican	Democratic
2024	50.7% 263	47.0% 244
2020	56.0% 296	43.5% 230
2016	59.3% 296	37.5% 187
2012	64.8% 411	34.1% 216
2008	62.7% 416	36.1% 240
2004	69.6% 519	29.1% 217

In the 2013 gubernatorial election, Republican Chris Christie received 82.7% of the vote (324 cast), ahead of Democrat Barbara Buono with 15.8% (62 votes), and other candidates with 1.5% (6 votes), among the 405 ballots cast by the borough's 742 registered voters (13 ballots were spoiled), for a turnout of 54.6%. In the 2009 gubernatorial election, Republican Chris Christie received 61.9% of the vote (349 ballots cast), ahead of both Democrat Jon Corzine with 30.5% (172 votes) and Independent Chris Daggett with 4.4% (25 votes), with 564 ballots cast among the borough's 808 registered voters, yielding a 69.8% turnout.

United States Senate election results for Stone Harbor1
Year	Republican		Democratic		Third party(ies)	
Year	No.	%	No.	%	No.	%
2024	269	54.45%	219	44.33%	6	1.21%
2018	279	66.27%	137	32.54%	5	1.19%
2012	376	64.94%	195	33.68%	8	1.38%
2006	385	72.50%	139	26.18%	7	1.32%

United States Senate election results for Stone Harbor2
Year	Republican		Democratic		Third party(ies)	
Year	No.	%	No.	%	No.	%
2020	300	58.37%	207	40.27%	7	1.36%
2014	232	68.24%	105	30.88%	3	0.88%
2013	202	66.67%	100	33.00%	1	0.33%
2008	406	67.89%	188	31.44%	4	0.67%

== Education ==
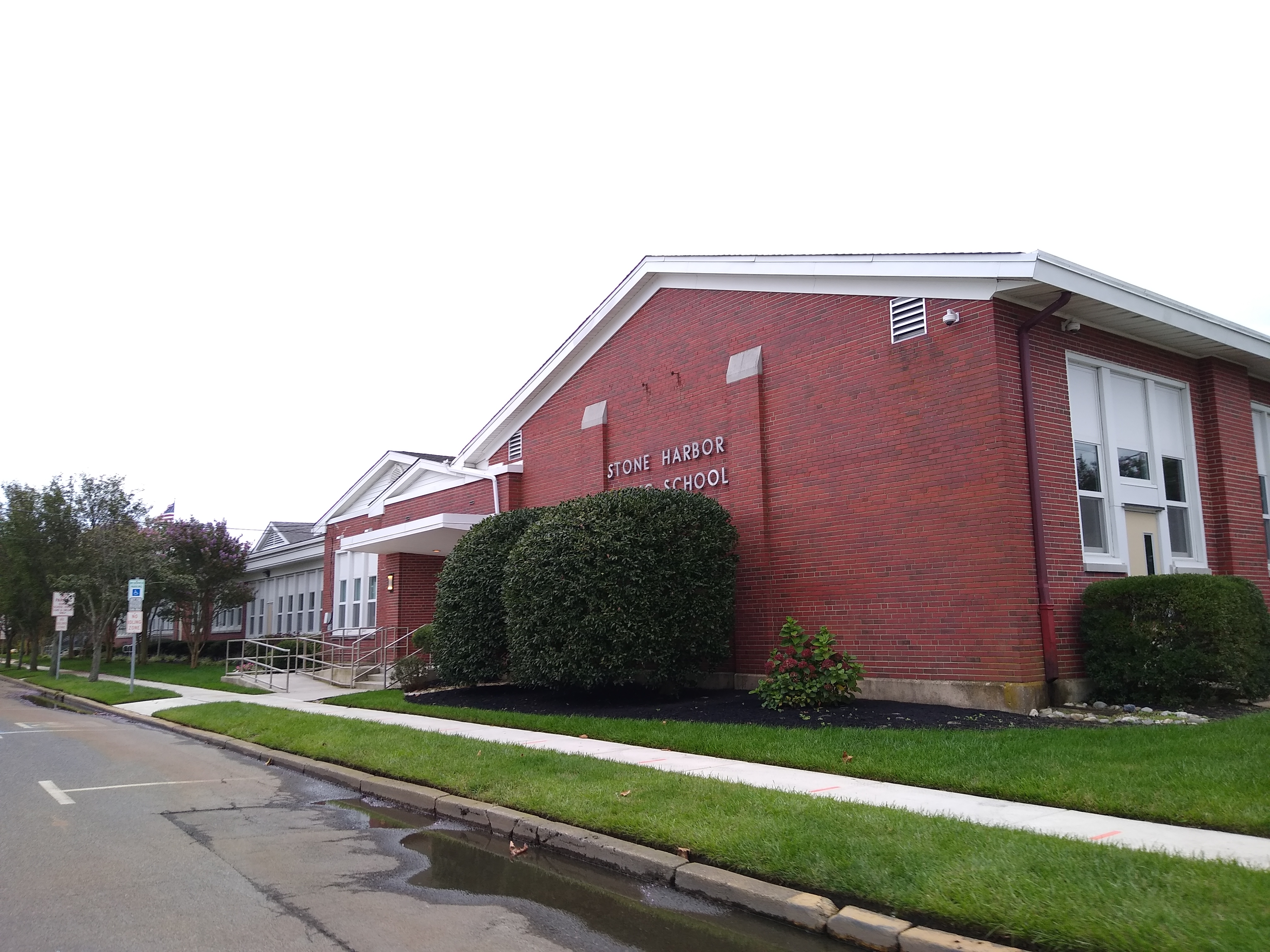
Stone Harbor School

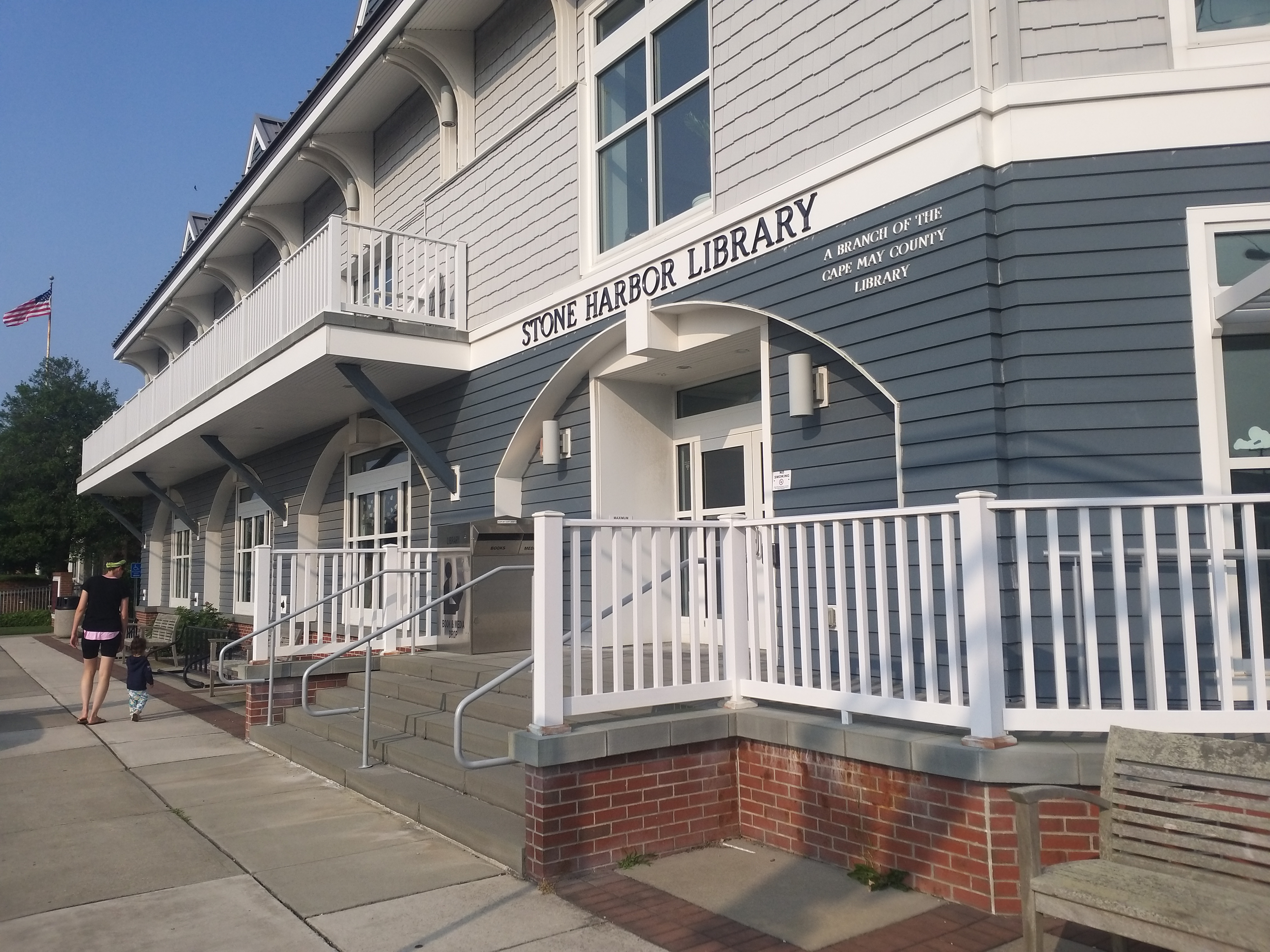
Stone Harbor Library

The Stone Harbor School District serves public school students in kindergarten through eighth grade. As of the 2023–24 school year, the district, comprised of one school, had an enrollment of 78 students and 9.7 classroom teachers (on an FTE basis), for a student–teacher ratio of 8.1:1. In the 2016–17 school year, Stone Harbor had the 4th-smallest enrollment of any school district in the state, with 75 students.

The Avalon and Stone Harbor school districts operate like a single school district even though they are legally two separate districts; they can move teachers between the two schools. In terms of their student populations both districts having among the lowest numbers in New Jersey. Starting with the 2011–12 school year, in an agreement with the Avalon School District, public school students in grades K–4 from both communities attend school in Stone Harbor while all students in grades 5–8 attend school in Avalon.

Students in public school for ninth through twelfth grades attend Middle Township High School in Cape May Court House, as part of a sending/receiving relationship with the Middle Township Public Schools, together with students from Avalon, Dennis Township and Woodbine. As of the 2023–24 school year, the high school had an enrollment of 825 students and 66.0 classroom teachers (on an FTE basis), for a student–teacher ratio of 12.5:1.

Students are also eligible to attend Cape May County Technical High School in Cape May Court House, which serves students from the entire county in its comprehensive and vocational programs, which are offered without charge to students who are county residents. Special needs students may be referred to Cape May County Special Services School District in the Cape May Court House area.

The Roman Catholic Diocese of Camden operates Bishop McHugh Regional School, a Catholic K–8 school, in Ocean View, Dennis Township, which has a Cape May Courthouse postal address. It is the parish school of Avalon/Stone Harbor Catholic Church and three other churches.

Cape May County Library operates the Stone Harbor Library.

== Transportation ==
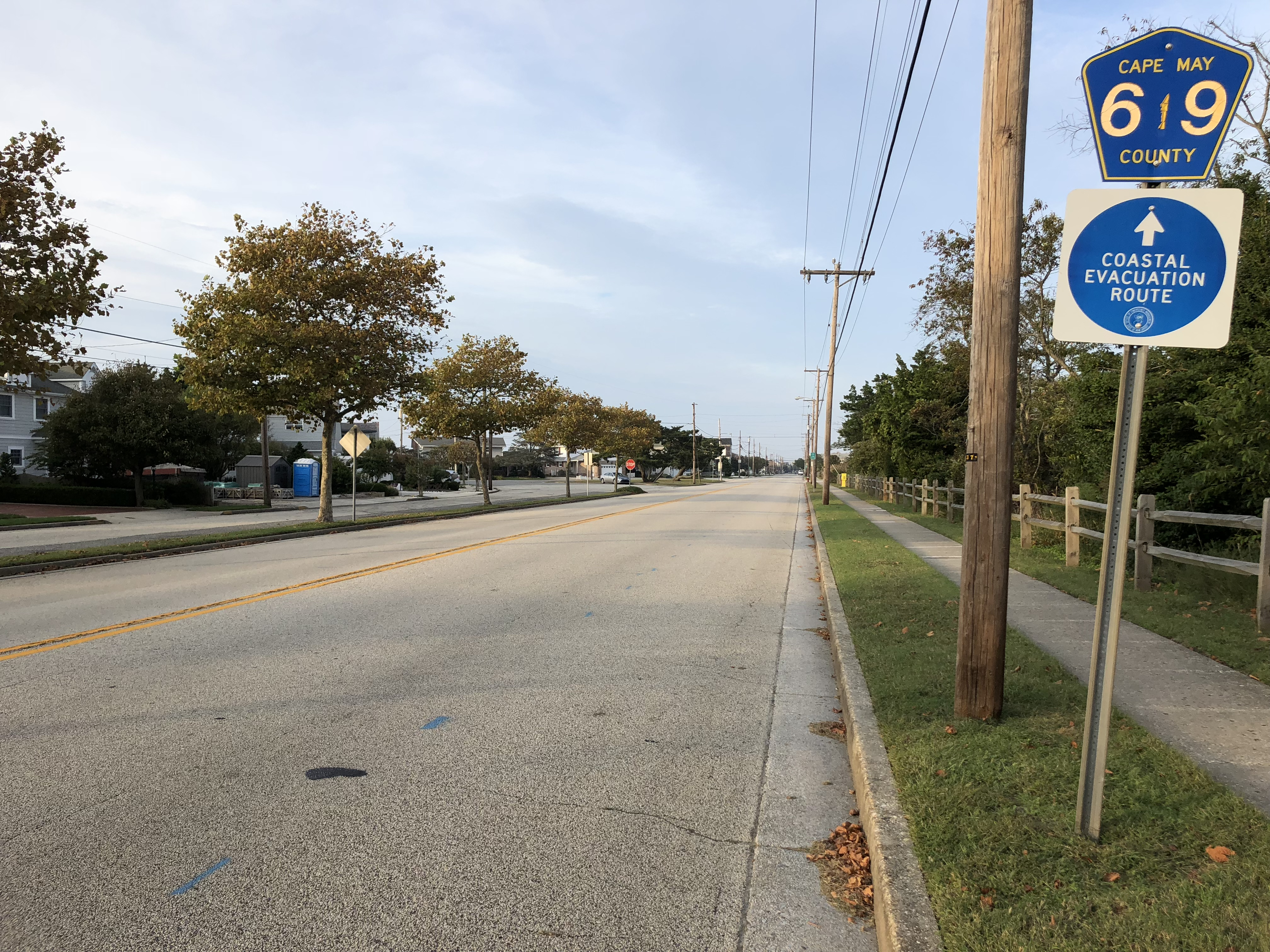
County Route 619 in Stone Harbor

=== Roads and highways ===
As of May 2010, the borough had a total of 24.11 miles (38.80 km) of roadways, of which 21.38 miles (34.41 km) were maintained by the municipality and 2.73 miles (4.39 km) by Cape May County.

No Interstate, U.S., state or major county highways pass through Stone Harbor. The most significant roads are minor county routes such as County Route 619, which follows Ocean Drive, and County Route 657, which provides access to the mainland and connects to the Garden State Parkway and U.S. Route 9.

=== Public transportation ===
NJ Transit offers the 315 inter-city bus route that runs through the town three times a day and shuttles people to and from Philadelphia, and the 319 route to the Port Authority Bus Terminal in Midtown Manhattan.

== Points of interest ==
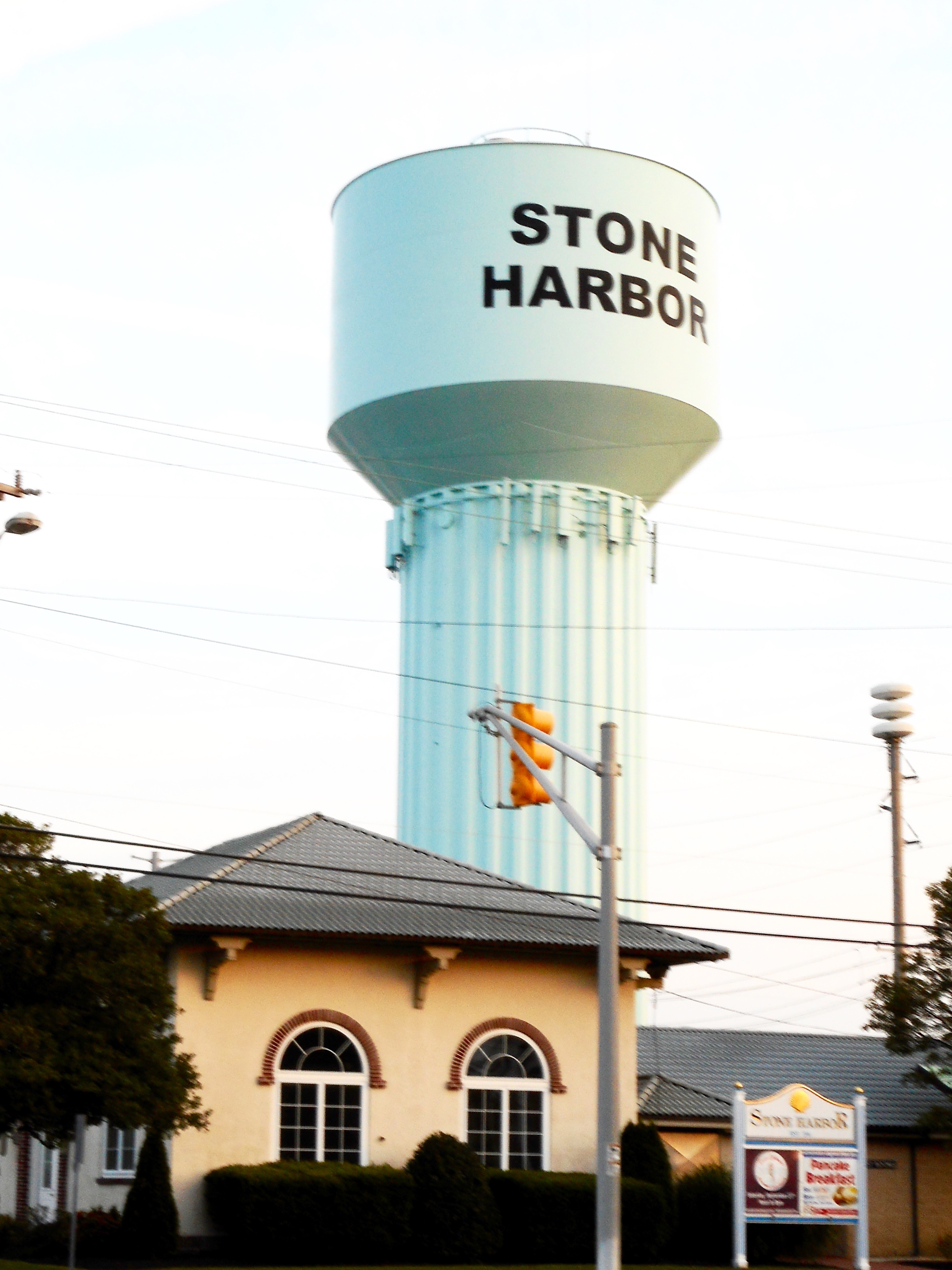
Water Tower and 1924 pumping station

The Stone Harbor Water Tower pumping station, built in 1924, is the oldest municipal structure still in use in Stone Harbor. The tower, 133 feet (41 m) high, can be seen from almost anywhere on the island. It holds 500,000 US gallons (1,900,000 L; 420,000 imp gal) of water and is supplied by four individual fresh water wells 890 feet (270 m) deep that tap the Kirkwood-Cohansey aquifer. In 2005, artist Peter Max developed a plan to cover the water tower with a mural made up of digital version of his paintings and artworks that covered 30 by 170 feet (9.1 by 51.8 m) that would be glued to the tower from June through September, with facsimiles of the art sold through Ocean Galleries as a fundraiser to benefit The Wetlands Institute and other charities.

Stone Harbor attractions include The Wetlands Institute, the Stone Harbor Bird Sanctuary and the Stone Harbor Museum. The Sisters, Servants of the Immaculate Heart of Mary, maintain the Villa Maria by the Sea convent, which opened in June 1937. The beach fronting the Villa is called Nun's Beach and is a well known surfing spot.

Stone Harbor's oceanfront was ranked the tenth-best beach in New Jersey in the 2008 Top 10 Beaches Contest sponsored by the New Jersey Marine Sciences Consortium.

== Climate ==
According to the Köppen climate classification system, Stone Harbor has a humid subtropical climate (Cfa) with hot, moderately humid summers, cool winters and year-around precipitation. Cfa climates are characterized by all months having an average mean temperature above 32.0 °F (0.0 °C), at least four months with an average mean temperature at or above 50.0 °F (10.0 °C), at least one month with an average mean temperature at or above 71.6 °F (22.0 °C) and no significant precipitation difference between seasons. During the summer months in Stone Harbor, a cooling afternoon sea breeze is present on most days, but episodes of extreme heat and humidity can occur with heat index values at or above 95.0 °F (35.0 °C). During the winter months, episodes of extreme cold and wind can occur with wind chill values below 0.0 °F (−17.8 °C). The plant hardiness zone at Stone Harbor Beach is 7b with an average annual extreme minimum air temperature of 6.0 °F (−14.4 °C). The average seasonal (November–April) snowfall total is 12 to 18 inches (300 to 460 mm), and the average snowiest month is February which corresponds with the annual peak in nor'easter activity.

Climate data for Stone Harbor Beach, NJ (1981–2010 Averages)
Month	Jan	Feb	Mar	Apr	May	Jun	Jul	Aug	Sep	Oct	Nov	Dec	Year
Mean daily maximum °F (°C)	42.2 (5.7)	44.0 (6.7)	50.9 (10.5)	60.4 (15.8)	69.6 (20.9)	78.5 (25.8)	83.3 (28.5)	81.8 (27.7)	76.1 (24.5)	66.2 (19.0)	56.5 (13.6)	46.9 (8.3)	63.1 (17.3)
Daily mean °F (°C)	34.6 (1.4)	36.4 (2.4)	42.9 (6.1)	52.3 (11.3)	61.4 (16.3)	70.7 (21.5)	75.9 (24.4)	74.6 (23.7)	68.4 (20.2)	57.9 (14.4)	48.5 (9.2)	39.2 (4.0)	55.3 (12.9)
Mean daily minimum °F (°C)	27.0 (−2.8)	28.8 (−1.8)	34.9 (1.6)	44.1 (6.7)	53.2 (11.8)	62.9 (17.2)	68.4 (20.2)	67.4 (19.7)	60.6 (15.9)	49.6 (9.8)	40.5 (4.7)	31.6 (−0.2)	47.5 (8.6)
Average precipitation inches (mm)	3.36 (85)	2.86 (73)	4.20 (107)	3.66 (93)	3.55 (90)	3.21 (82)	3.81 (97)	4.21 (107)	3.40 (86)	3.61 (92)	3.31 (84)	3.67 (93)	42.85 (1,088)
Average relative humidity (%)	66.3	65.1	63.1	61.6	66.1	70.9	70.0	73.3	70.4	69.3	67.9	66.8	67.6
Average dew point °F (°C)	24.5 (−4.2)	25.8 (−3.4)	31.2 (−0.4)	39.5 (4.2)	50.0 (10.0)	60.8 (16.0)	65.4 (18.6)	65.5 (18.6)	58.4 (14.7)	47.9 (8.8)	38.4 (3.6)	29.1 (−1.6)	44.8 (7.1)
Source: PRISM

Climate data for North Cape May, NJ Ocean Water Temperature (12 SW Stone Harbor)
Month	Jan	Feb	Mar	Apr	May	Jun	Jul	Aug	Sep	Oct	Nov	Dec	Year
Daily mean °F (°C)	37 (3)	37 (3)	42 (6)	50 (10)	59 (15)	68 (20)	73 (23)	74 (23)	72 (22)	61 (16)	52 (11)	42 (6)	56 (13)
Source: NOAA

== Ecology ==
According to the A. W. Kuchler U.S. potential natural vegetation types, Stone Harbor would have a dominant vegetation type of northern cordgrass (73) with a dominant vegetation form of coastal prairie (20).

== Notable people ==
People who were born in, residents of, or otherwise closely associated with Stone Harbor include:

- Joseph Hergesheimer (1880–1954), writer of the early 20th century known for his naturalistic novels of decadent life among the very wealthy
- Owen Murphy (1893–1965), songwriter, film maker, and writer for radio, film, and theatre
- Clarence Charles Newcomer (1923–2005), United States federal judge
- Taylor Swift (born 1989), summered until age 14, describing Stone Harbor as a "pretty magical place to grow up"
- Donald Voorhees (1903–1989), composer and conductor who received an Emmy Award nomination for "Individual Achievements in Music" for his work on the television series, The Bell Telephone Hour
- Josh Weikert (born 1978), Immaculata University professor, author, and six-time Jeopardy! champion summers in Stone Harbor

Preceded by Avalon	Beaches of New Jersey	Succeeded by North Wildwood
