= The Wetlands Institute =

American nonprofit organization

Wetlands Institute
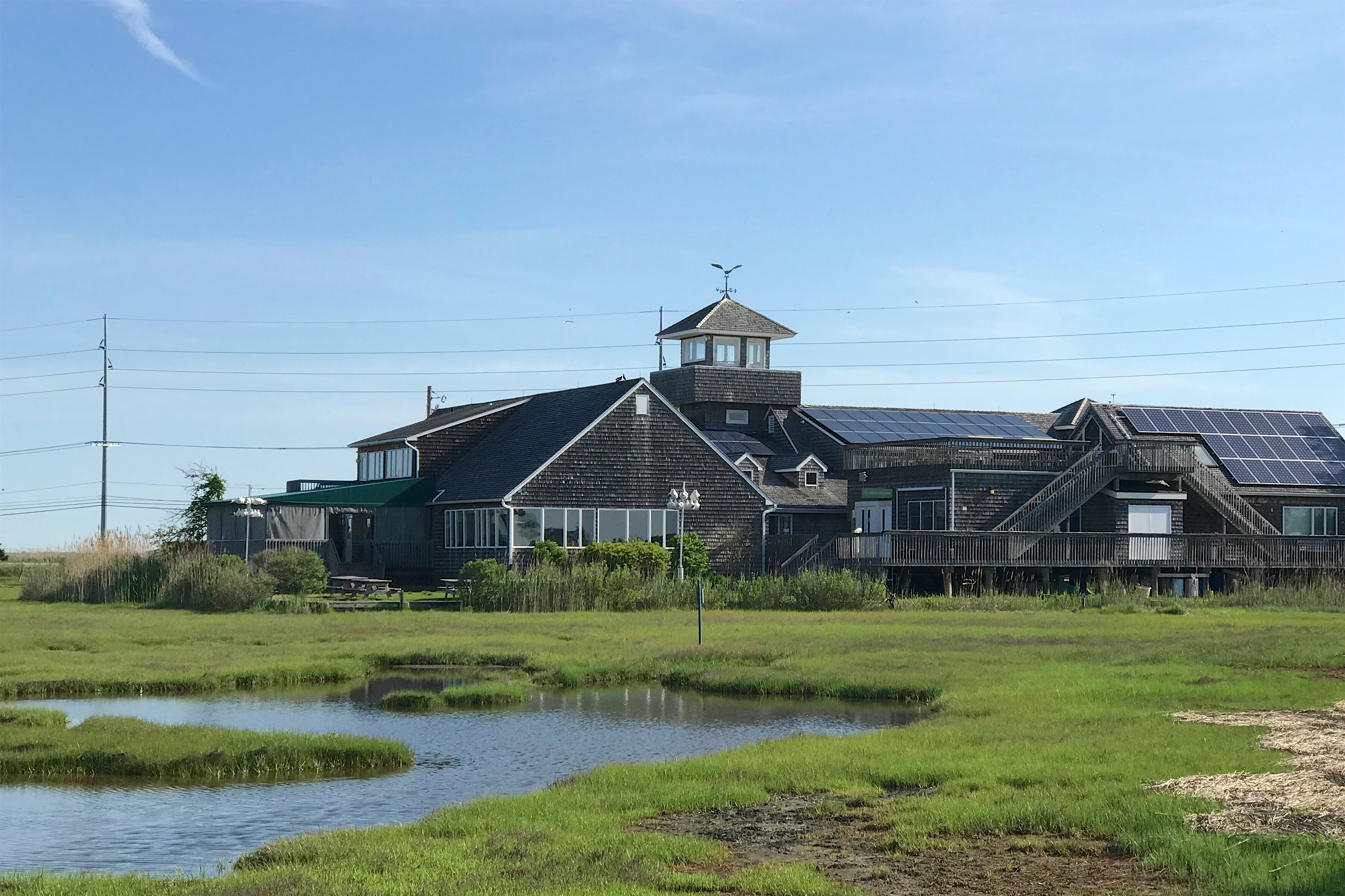
- Wetlands Institute in 2018

- Location within Cape May County, New Jersey Location within New Jersey Location within the United States
- Location: 1075 Stone Harbor Boulevard; Stone Harbor, New Jersey
- Coordinates: 39°03′38″N 74°46′23″W
- Website: wetlandsinstitute.org

The Wetlands Institute is a non-profit organization started in 1969 by the executive director of WWF, Herbert Mills. The Wetlands Institute sits on 6,000 acres (24 km^{2}) of protected wetlands in Stone Harbor, New Jersey. It hosts educational tours and courses and is a base for research on wetlands ecology.

It is home to the annual Wings 'n Water art festival.
