= Sweetwater =

Sweetwater or Sweet Water may refer to:

- Freshwater

== Places ==
=== In the United States ===
- Sweet Water, Alabama
- Sweetwater, Arizona
- Sweetwater River (California), San Diego County
  - Sweetwater Dam, a dam across the Sweetwater River
  - Sweetwater Reservoir, an artificial lake, formed by Sweetwater Dam
- Sweetwater Mountains a small mountain range in California and western Nevada
- Sweetwater Formation, a geologic stratigraphic formation in California
- Sweetwater, Miami-Dade County, Florida
- Sweetwater, Duval County, Florida, a place in Florida
- Sweetwater Ranch, Florida, an unincorporated community in Hardee County
- Sweetwater, Liberty County, Florida, a place in Florida
- Sweet Water, Illinois
- Sweetwater, Georgia
- Sweetwater, Idaho
- Sweetwater, Missouri
- Sweetwater, Nebraska
- Sweetwater, Nevada
- Sweetwater, New Jersey
- Sweetwater, Oklahoma
- Sweetwater, Tennessee
- Sweetwater, Texas
  - Sweetwater Swatters, a baseball team based in Sweetwater, Texas
- Sweetwater County, Wyoming
- Sweetwater River (Wyoming)
- Sweetwater Township, Michigan
- Sweetwater Township, Clay County, North Carolina

=== Elsewhere ===
- Sweetwater, London, a town built on the site of Olympic Park, London

== Film and television ==
- Sweetwater (2023 film), an American sports biographical film
- Sweetwater (2013 film), an American western film
- Sweetwater (1983 film), an American film starring Diane Ladd
- Sweetwater (1988 film), a Norwegian film starring Petronella Barker
- Sweetwater, a fictional ranch in Once Upon a Time in the West
- Sweetwater, a fictional town in Westworld

== Literature ==
- Sweetwater, 1973 novel by Laurence Yep
- Sweetwater, 1976 novel by Knut Faldbakken
- The Sweetwater, 1976 novel by Jean Rikhoff
- Sweetwater, a character in At Heaven's Gate by Robert Penn Warren
- Ned Sweetwater, a character in the Mandie series by Lois Gladys Leppard

== Music ==
- Sweetwater (band), a 1960s band
  - Sweetwater (album)
- Sweet Water (band), a 1990s American band, or their debut album
- Sweetwaters Music Festival, a festival in New Zealand
- Sweetwater Saloon, a bar and music venue in Mill Valley, California
  - Live at Sweetwater, a live album, recorded by Hot Tuna, in 1992, at Mill Valley, California
  - Live at Sweetwater Two, a live album, recorded by Hot Tuna, in 1992, at Mill Valley, California
- Sweetwater Sound, American music instruments retailer

== Schools ==
- Sweet Water High School, Sweet Water, Alabama
- Sweetwater High School (National City, California)
- Sweetwater Union High School District, California
- Sweetwater City Schools, a school district of Sweetwater, Tennessee
- Sweetwater Independent School District, Sweetwater, Texas
- Sweetwater County School District Number 1, Wyoming
- Sweetwater County School District Number 2, Wyoming

== Other uses ==
- Sweetwater (grape) or Chasselas, a grape varietal
- SweetWater Brewing Company a brewery in Atlanta, Georgia, US
- Sweetwater Brewery, a brewery in Green River, Wyoming, US
- Sweetwater Casino, a casino in Mullica Township, New Jersey, US
- Sweetwater Inn, an inn in McDuffie County, Georgia, US
- Sweetwater Mansion, a plantation house in Florence, Alabama, US
- Sweetwater Sound, an American musical instrument and equipment retailer
- Nathaniel Clifton or Sweetwater (1922–1990), American basketball player
- Sweet Water, a fictional ruined city in Might and Magic VI: The Mandate of Heaven
- Sweetwater Dam Naval Outlying Landing Field

== See also ==
- Cordry Sweetwater Lakes, Indiana
- Sewickley, Pennsylvania, translated as Sweetwater
- Sweetwater Canal (disambiguation)
- Sweetwater Creek (disambiguation)
- Sweetwater River (disambiguation)
