= Nesco, New Jersey =

Populated place in Atlantic County, New Jersey, US

- Census-designated place
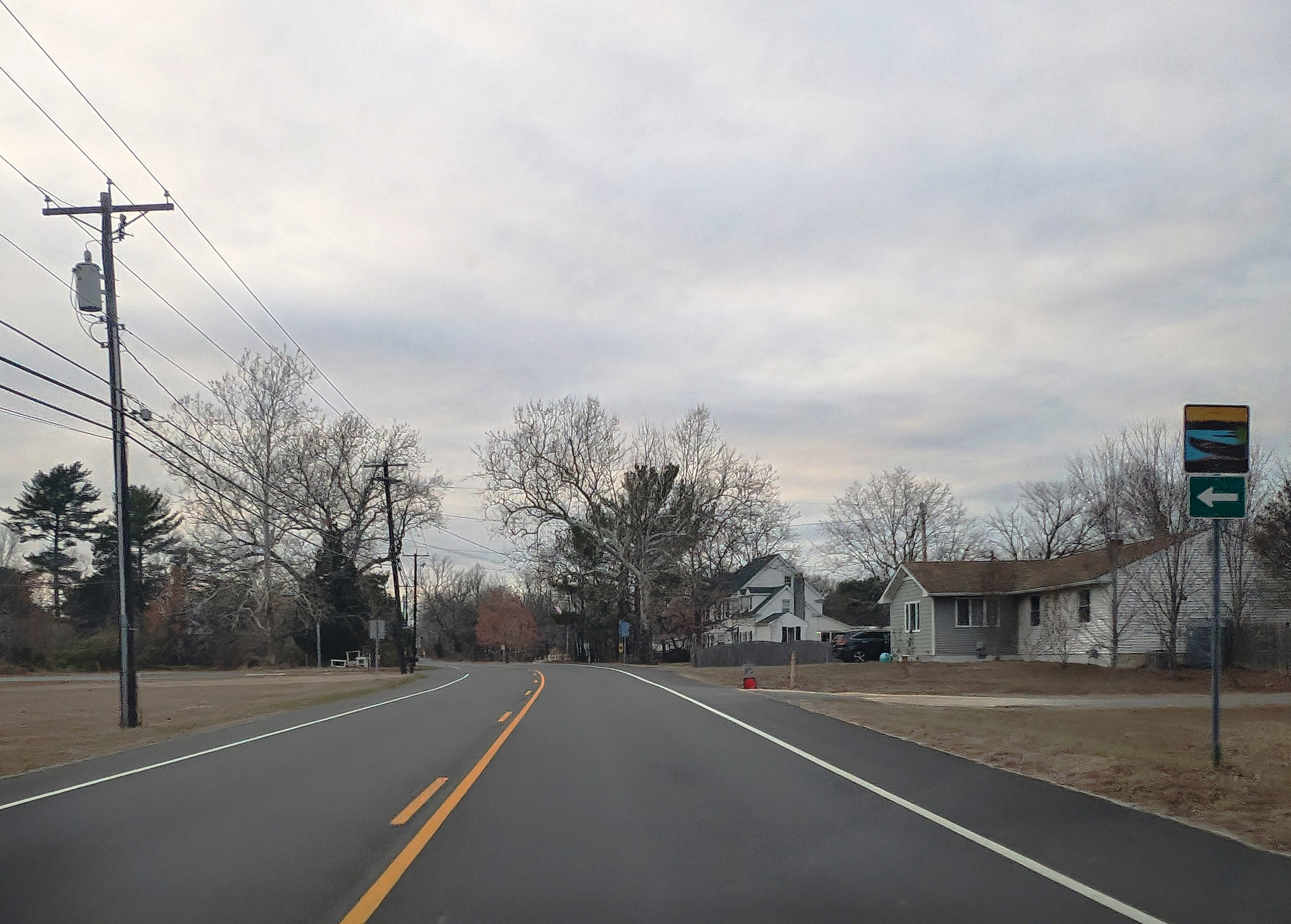
- CR 542 westbound in Nesco

- Location in Atlantic County Location in New Jersey Location in the United States
- Coordinates: 39°38′17″N 74°41′48″W
- Country: United States
- State: New Jersey
- County: Atlantic
- Township: Mullica

Area
  - Total: 2.64 sq mi (6.84 km^{2})
  - Land: 2.64 sq mi (6.84 km^{2})
  - Water: 0 sq mi (0.00 km^{2})
- Elevation: 46 ft (14 m)

Population (2020)
  - Total: 422
  - Density: 160/sq mi (61.7/km^{2})
- Time zone: UTC−05:00 (Eastern (EST))
  - Summer (DST): UTC−04:00 (EDT)
- FIPS code: 34-50010
- GNIS feature ID: 878708

Nesco (also called New Columbia) is an unincorporated community and census-designated place (CDP) located in Mullica Township, Atlantic County, in the U.S. state of New Jersey.

As of the 2020 census, Nesco had a population of 422.

Nesco is located approximately 6 mi (9.7 km) east of Hammonton.

The New Columbia-Nesco United Methodist Church is located there. The Nesco School is located west of the settlement.

== History ==
A historic plaque is located at the Indian Cabin Mill Inn in Nesco, where fugitive Joe Mulliner—the "Robin Hood of the Pines"—surrendered to authorities. Mulliner had settled in nearby Pleasant Mills, but was forced to flee after remaining loyal to England in the Revolutionary War. Mulliner and 40 others formed a gang and hid on an island in the nearby Mullica River, from where they launched criminal attacks. The gang would rob residents, but was known for its lack of violence and for not robbing the poor. Following Mulliner's capture at the Indian Cabin Mill Inn, he was tried in Burlington in 1781 and then hanged.

A glass manufacturing plant opened in New Columbia in 1845.

In the 1880 census, the population of New Columbia was 96.

New Columbia had a post office by 1892.

The settlement's name changed to "Nesco" in 1897.

== Demographics ==
Historical population
Census	Pop.	Note	%±
2020	422		—
U.S. Decennial Census; 2020

Nesco was first listed as a census designated place in the 2020 U.S. census.

Nesco CDP, New Jersey – Racial and ethnic composition Note: the US Census treats Hispanic/Latino as an ethnic category. This table excludes Latinos from the racial categories and assigns them to a separate category. Hispanics/Latinos may be of any race.
Race / Ethnicity (NH = Non-Hispanic)	Pop 2020	2020
White alone (NH)	360	85.31%
Black or African American alone (NH)	6	1.42%
Native American or Alaska Native alone (NH)	0	0.00%
Asian alone (NH)	3	0.71%
Native Hawaiian or Pacific Islander alone (NH)	1	0.24%
Other race alone (NH)	2	0.47%
Mixed race or Multiracial (NH)	10	2.37%
Hispanic or Latino (any race)	40	9.48%
Total	422	100.00%

As of 2020, the population was 422.

== Education ==
The CDP is within two school districts: Mullica Township School District (elementary) and Greater Egg Harbor Regional High School District. The zoned high school for Mullica Township is Cedar Creek High School, which is a part of the Greater Egg Harbor district.
