= Sweetwater Creek =

Sweetwater Creek may refer to:

- Sweetwater Creek (novel), a novel by Anne Rivers Siddons
- Sweetwater Creek (Colorado River tributary), Colorado
- Sweetwater Creek, Florida, an unincorporated community in Hillsborough County, Florida
- Sweetwater Creek (Chattahoochee River), Georgia
  - Sweetwater Creek State Park, in Douglas County, Georgia
- Sweetwater Creek (Echeconnee Creek tributary), Georgia
- Sweetwater Creek (Flint River tributary), Georgia
- Sweetwater Creek (Logan Creek), a stream in Missouri
- Sweetwater Creek (Comanche County, Texas)
- Sweetwater Creek (Gray County, Texas)
- Sweetwater Creek (Nolan County, Texas), namesake of Sweetwater, Texas
- Sweetwater Creek (Wise County, Texas)
- Sweetwater Creek (Tennessee River), tributary to the Tennessee River at Loudon, Tennessee
- Sweetwater Creek in Frankston, Victoria, Australia

== See also ==
- Sweetwater (disambiguation)
- Sweetwater River (disambiguation)
