= Absegami High School =

High school in Atlantic County, New Jersey, US

Location
- 201 South Wrangleboro Road; Galloway Township, Atlantic County, New Jersey 08205; United States; 39.474014°N 74.513473°W

Information
- Type: Public high school
- Established: 1972
- School district: Greater Egg Harbor Regional High School District
- NCES School ID: 340606000122
- Principal: Daniel Kern
- Faculty: 100.9 FTEs
- Grades: 9–12
- Enrollment: 1,130 (as of 2024–25)
- Student to teacher ratio: 11.2:1
- Colors: Brown and Vegas Gold
- Athletics conference: Cape-Atlantic League
- Team name: Braves
- GEHRHSD: Absegami High School; Cedar Creek High School; Oakcrest High School
- Community served: Galloway Township
- Website: www.gehrhsd.net/o/ahs

Absegami High School is a four-year comprehensive public high school serving students in ninth through twelfth grades in Galloway Township, Atlantic County, in the U.S. state of New Jersey The student body comes from Galloway Township. The school is one of three secondary schools operating as part of the Greater Egg Harbor Regional High School District, which also serves students from the constituent municipalities of Egg Harbor City, Hamilton Township and Mullica Township, together with students from Port Republic and Washington Township (in Burlington County) who attend as part of sending/receiving relationships. Oakcrest High School and Cedar Creek High School are Absegami's sister schools.

As of the 2024–25 school year, the school had an enrollment of 1,130 students and 100.9 classroom teachers (on an FTE basis), for a student–teacher ratio of 11.2:1. There were 487 students (43.1% of enrollment) eligible for free lunch and 125 (11.1% of students) eligible for reduced-cost lunch.

The school has a variety of programs designed for a diverse student body, including 'special needs', a "High School-to-Work" program, college preparatory, Advanced Placement (AP), and performing arts. The school offers 13 courses through which students earn college credits by taking AP examinations, and 89% of students planned to go on to college. In addition, the Greater Egg Harbor District offers Magnet Programs in each of their schools. These programs provide students with specialized curriculum pertaining to a specific field, across their four year educational experience. Absegami High School offers three of these programs, including the Homeland Security and Public Safety Magnet, Computer Science and Network Technology Magnet, and Culinary Arts Magnet.

== History ==
Absegami High School was established at the start of the 1972–73 school year as a school-within-a-school inside Oakcrest High School. Absegami had its own independent identity and held classes rotating afternoons, with Oakcrest meeting during yearly rotating morning sessions. By a three-vote margin, voters in the district approved a referendum by 1,152-1,149 to spend $11.89 million (equivalent to $52.7 million in 2025) for the construction of Absegami's own building on a 120-acre (49 ha) site in Galloway Township. Absegami High School opened independently in its own building in September 1982.

In 1983, William F. Buckley Jr. and former National Security Advisor Zbigniew Brzezinski appeared at the school to record an episode of Firing Line.

In a referendum held in September 2007, voters approved by a 3,176 to 1,719 margin a plan to construct a third high school in the district, to be located in Egg Harbor City, which would help alleviate overcrowding in the two existing schools and serve students from Egg Harbor City and Mullica Township. Construction started in Fall 2008 and was completed in Summer 2010 at a total project cost of $80 million (of which $59.9 million was related to construction costs), with the new facility opening that September.

== Awards, recognition and rankings ==
The school was the 164th-ranked public high school in New Jersey out of 339 schools statewide in New Jersey Monthly magazine's September 2014 cover story on the state's "Top Public High Schools", using a new ranking methodology. The school had been ranked 260th in the state of 328 schools in 2012, after being ranked 238th in 2010 out of 322 schools listed. The magazine ranked the school 230th in 2008 out of 316 schools. The school was ranked 231st in the magazine's September 2006 issue, which surveyed 316 schools across the state.

== Programs ==
The school's mission statement objective is to "provide each student the educational opportunity and support that will enable him or her to develop the skills necessary to function politically, economically, and socially as a responsible and contributing citizen in a democratic society." To accomplish this goal, Absegami provides a diverse range of classes designed to help students reach their full potential during their future careers in mathematics, art, wood technology, humanities, and science.

== Athletics ==
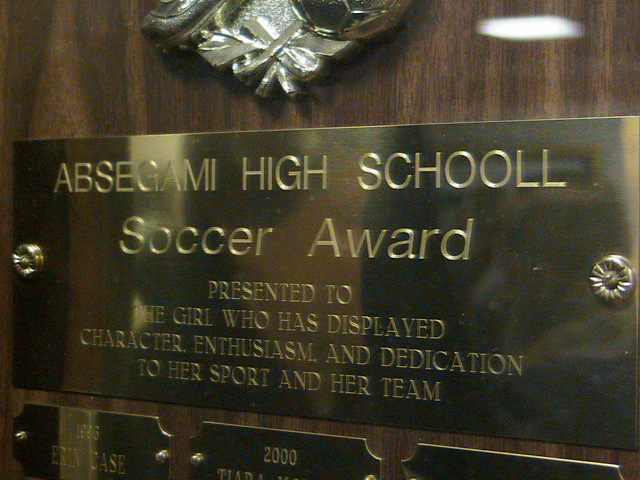
Girls Soccer Award plaque, a sample of the various awards Absegami has collected.

The Absegami High School Braves compete in the Atlantic Division of the Cape-Atlantic League, an athletic conference comprised of public and private high schools in Atlantic, Cape May, Cumberland and Gloucester counties that operates under the supervision of the New Jersey State Interscholastic Athletic Association (NJSIAA). With 893 students in grades 10–12, the school was classified by the NJSIAA for the 2022–24 school year as Group III South for most athletic competition purposes. The football team competes in the United Division of the 94-team West Jersey Football League superconference and was classified by the NJSIAA as Group III South for football for 2024–2026, which included schools with 695 to 882 students.

School colors are brown and Vegas gold. Sports offered at the school include tennis (women), lacrosse (men), lacrosse (women), baseball, track and field winter (men), tennis (men), track and field winter (women), swimming (women), golf (men), swimming (men), field hockey, soccer (women), football, soccer (men), cross country (women), softball, volleyball (women), basketball (men), wrestling (men), track and field spring (women), basketball (women), track and field spring (men), cross country (men), crew (women), crew (men).

The wrestling team won the South Jersey Group III sectional title in 1997 and the South Jersey Group IV championship in 1999, 2001, 2002, 2003 and 2004. The team was Group IV state champion in 2001 to 2004.

The girls basketball team won the Group IV state title in 2005 (defeating Montclair High School in the tournament finals) and 2006 (vs. Bayonne High School). Behind by as many as 13 points late in the first half of the finals, the 2005 team came back to defeat Montclair 62-57 and win the Group IV championship. The team won the Group IV title in 2006 with a 58-48 win against Bayonne at the Ritacco Center.

The football team beat Cherokee High School 27–26 to win the 2006 South Jersey Group IV championship.

The boys spring track team won the state championship in Group IV in 2008.

The boys indoor track team won the Group IV state championship in 2010.

== Marching band ==
The band was Tournament Of Bands Chapter 1 Champions 1991 (Group 2), 1998-2005, 2021 (Group 3). NJ State Champions 1991, 98, 99, 2000, 01, 02, 03, 04, 05, 06, 13. Atlantic Coast Group III Champions 1998, 2002. USSBA Central Jersey Regional Champions 2006, 2007, 2010. USSBA/USBands New Jersey State Champions 2007, 2008, 2009, 2010, 2011, 2013, 2014, and 2025. Absegami was recognized as the USSBA Group IV National Champions for 2006, for its program titled "Through the Eyes of Children". Absegami Marching Braves won the title of group lV AA national champions 2013 with their show, "New World Symphony" as well as Group IVA New Jersey State Champions and had the first undefeated season in history.

== Administration ==
The school's principal is Daniel Kern. His administration team includes three assistant principals and the athletic director.

== Notable alumni ==
- Abdullah Anderson (born 1996), American football defensive end for the Tennessee Titans of the National Football League
- Tabitha D'umo (born 1973), hip hop choreographer
- Anne Grunow (born c. 1959, class of 1977), senior research scientist at Ohio State University in the Byrd Polar Research Center
- Mike Isgro (born c. 1988, class of 2006), college football coach who is head coach of the Delaware Valley University football team
- Meaghan Jarensky (born 1978), Miss New York USA 2005
- Rodney Jerkins (born 1977), producer, hip hop mogul
- Mushond Lee (born 1967), actor who appeared on The Cosby Show and in the film Lean on Me
- Ford Palmer (born 1990, class of 2009), professional middle-distance runner who specializes in the 1500 meters and the mile
- Vincent J. Polistina (born 1971), politician who served in the New Jersey General Assembly, where he represented the 2nd Legislative District from 2008 to 2012
- Erica Skroski (born 1994), soccer player who played as a defender for Sky Blue FC in the NWSL

== Notable faculty ==
- Doug Colman (born 1973), former NFL linebacker who coached Absegami to a 40–15 record, including the program's only South Jersey Group IV championship, won in 2006
