= Sweetwater, New Jersey =

Populated place in Atlantic County, New Jersey, US

- Unincorporated community
- Location in Atlantic County Location in New Jersey Location in the United States
- Coordinates: 39°37′16″N 74°38′17″W
- Country: United States
- State: New Jersey
- County: Atlantic
- Township: Mullica

Area
  - Total: 3.74 sq mi (9.69 km^{2})
  - Land: 3.56 sq mi (9.23 km^{2})
  - Water: 0.18 sq mi (0.46 km^{2})
- Elevation: 6.6 ft (2 m)

Population (2020)
  - Total: 805
  - Density: 225.8/sq mi (87.18/km^{2})
- ZIP Code: 08037
- FIPS code: 34-71880
- GNIS feature ID: 0881058

Historical population
Census	Pop.	Note	%±
2020	805		—
U.S. Decennial Census

Sweetwater is an unincorporated community and census-designated place (CDP) located within Mullica Township in Atlantic County, in the U.S. state of New Jersey. As of the 2020 census, Sweetwater had a population of 805. The community is situated on the Mullica River about 20 miles (32 km) from Atlantic City.

== Demographics ==
Sweetwater was first listed as a census designated place in the 2020 U.S. census.

Sweetwater CDP, New Jersey – Racial and ethnic composition Note: the US Census treats Hispanic/Latino as an ethnic category. This table excludes Latinos from the racial categories and assigns them to a separate category. Hispanics/Latinos may be of any race.
Race / Ethnicity (NH = Non-Hispanic)	Pop 2020	2020
White alone (NH)	727	90.31%
Black or African American alone (NH)	15	1.86%
Native American or Alaska Native alone (NH)	0	0.00%
Asian alone (NH)	7	0.87%
Native Hawaiian or Pacific Islander alone (NH)	0	0.00%
Other race alone (NH)	0	0.00%
Mixed race or Multiracial (NH)	25	3.11%
Hispanic or Latino (any race)	31	3.85%
Total	805	100.00%

== Education ==
The CDP is within two school districts: Mullica Township School District (elementary) and Greater Egg Harbor Regional High School District. The zoned high school for Mullica Township is Cedar Creek High School, which is a part of the Greater Egg Harbor district.
