= Landing Creek (New Jersey) =

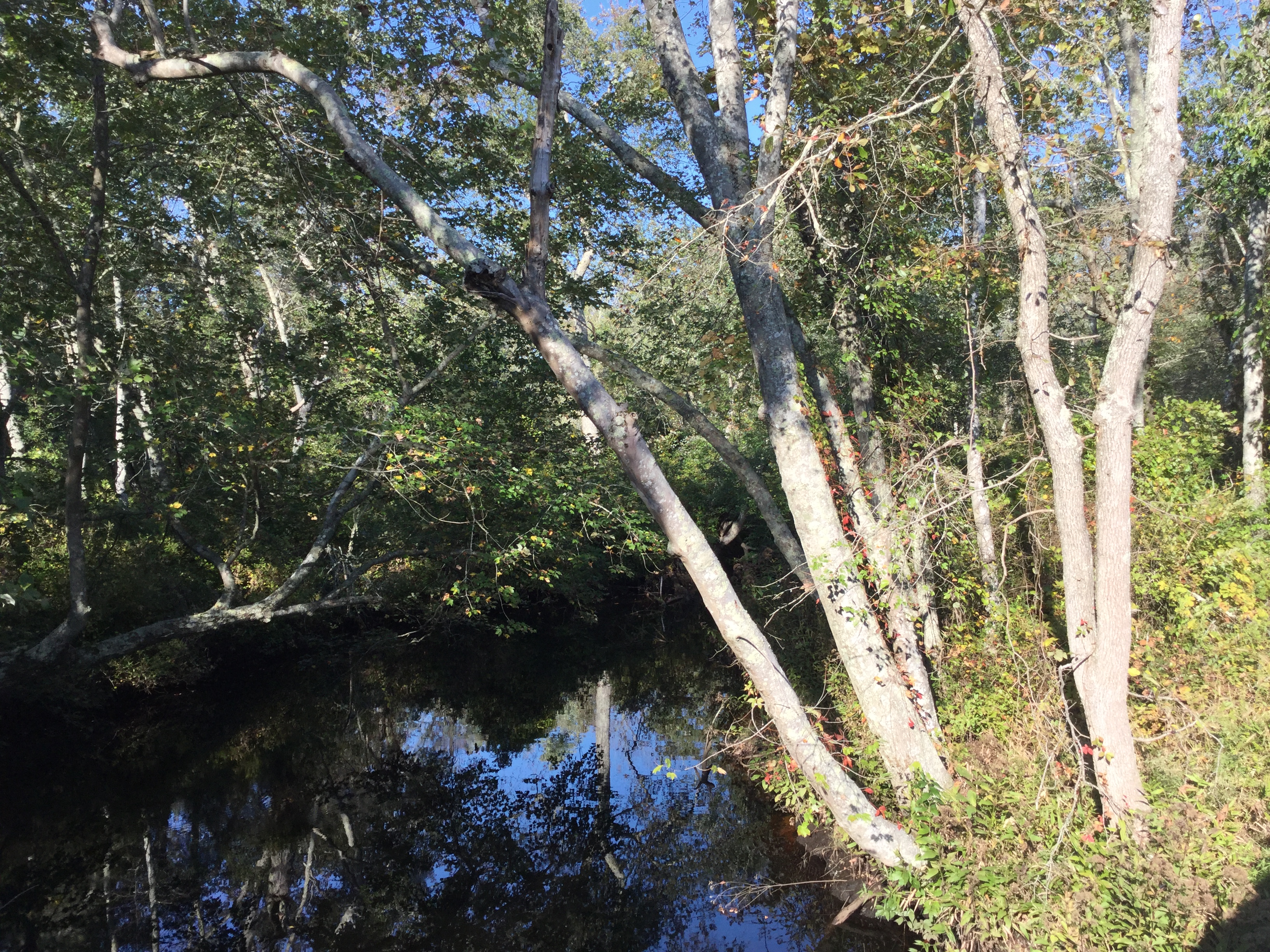
- Landing Creek just north of Clarks Landing Rd.

- Location of Landing Creek's mouth in Atlantic County, New Jersey

Location
- Country: United States
- State: New Jersey
- County: Atlantic County
- Municipalities: Mullica Township, Galloway Township, Egg Harbor City

Physical characteristics
- Source
  - location: Mullica Township
  - coordinates: 39°32′18.7″N 74°41′04.1″W
- Mouth: Mullica River
  - location: Egg Harbor City
  - coordinates: 39°34′55.5″N 74°32′38.8″W
- Length: 11.2 miles (18.0 km)

Basin features
- Tributaries
  - left: Indian Cabin Creek
  - right: Union Creek, Elliots Creek, Rubins Run

Landing Creek is an 11.2-mile-long (18.0 km) tributary of the Mullica River in southern New Jersey in the United States. The creek originates near Egg Harbor City and joins the Mullica River just below Lower Bank near Hog Islands. It is joined along its route by Union Creek, Elliots Creek, Indian Cabin Creek, and Rubins Run, in that order.

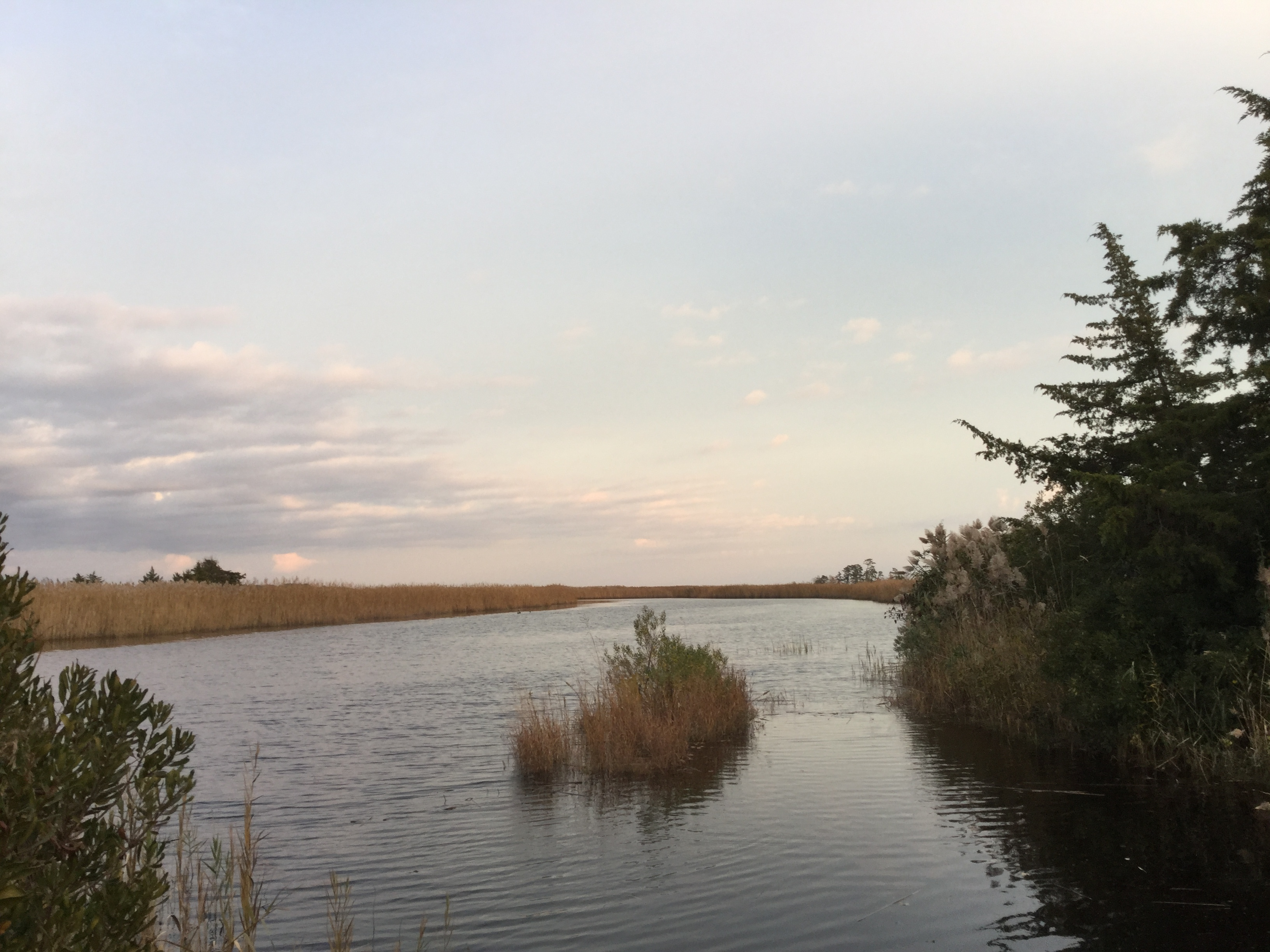
Landing Creek about a mile upstream from its mouth

For much of its length, Landing Creek has a typical Pine Barrens character to it as it runs through upland forests of oak and pitch pine with periodic passes through cedar and maple swamps. Downstream from Clarks Landing Road, the stream becomes tidal and infiltrated by brackish water. For these last few miles of its stretch, Landing Creek widens and passes through an extensive marshland which is characteristic of the Mullica River estuary. As late as 1921, Gloucester Lake was located on Landing Creek.

== See also ==
- List of rivers of New Jersey
