= Eric Pålsson Mullica =

- Born: 1637; Mora, Gävleborg County, Sweden
- Died: 1704 (aged 66–67)
- Other name: Eric Pålsson Mullikka

Eric Pålsson Mullica (or Mullikka, 1636/37 – before 1704) was an early Swedish settler (with Finnish ancestry) to New Sweden. He and his family were the source of the name of several geographic features and places in New Jersey.

== Background ==
Eric (or "Erkki", original Finnish name) Mullica was born in April 1636 in Mora, Delsbo parish, Hälsingland, Sweden. His father was Pål Jönsson Mullica, who arrived in New Sweden with his wife and children on the vessel Örnen (Eagle), which sailed in 1654 from Gothenburg, Sweden. The father of Pål (Paavo) was Juho Mulikka, who had earlier moved to Sweden from Finland. Juho's father was Antti Mulikka, who lived in central Finland in an area which is still called Mulikka or Pääjärvi. "Mullica" is a variation of the Finnish term mullikka, which means 'young bull'.

Mullica lived for several years at Tacony, adjoining the present-day Frankford neighborhood of Philadelphia, Pennsylvania and later moved to the area of Little Egg Harbor, New Jersey. Mullica built a homestead near Little Egg Harbor at what is now the settlement of Lower Bank in Washington Township, Burlington County, New Jersey. An area near where he resided near Little Egg Harbor was named Mullica Township in Atlantic County, New Jersey in his honor. What had been known as the "Little Egg Harbor River" is now called the Mullica River.

Eric's sons, William, Eric Jr. and John moved further west to an area now known as Mullica Hill, a census-designated place located within Harrison Township, in Gloucester County, New Jersey.

Mullica first married Ingrid, the daughter of Olof Philipsson, a Finn who arrived with his family on the Mercurius in 1656. All of Mullica's eight children were by his first wife. After Ingrid's death, Mullica married Ingeborg Helm, daughter of Capt. Israel Helm. Mullica died before 1704.

In 1704, three of Eric and Ingrid's children, Eric Jr., William and John, purchased 400 acres (1.6 km^{2}) of land and built farmhouses. Eric Jr. and William built their houses that dates to 1704 and are now located on North Main Street in Mullica Hill near each other. In 1996 the Eric's house was purchased by a local merchant. William's house is also owned by a local merchant.

== Legacy ==
- Township of Mullica – Township in Atlantic County on Mullica River.
- Mullica Hill – Populated place in Gloucester County, about 7 miles (11 km) west of Glassboro
- Mullica Hill Pond – Reservoir in Gloucester County, on the southeastern border of Mullica Hill.
- Mullica Landing Point – Airport in Atlantic County, 2 miles (3.2 km) NW of Egg Harbor City.
- Mullica River – River in Atlantic, Burlington, Camden and Ocean Counties.

== Other sources ==
- Benson, Adolph B. and Naboth Hedin, eds. Swedes in America, 1638–1938 (The Swedish American Tercentenary Association. New Haven, CT: Yale University Press. 1938) ISBN 978-0-8383-0326-9
