= Mullica River fire =

2022 wildfire in New Jersey

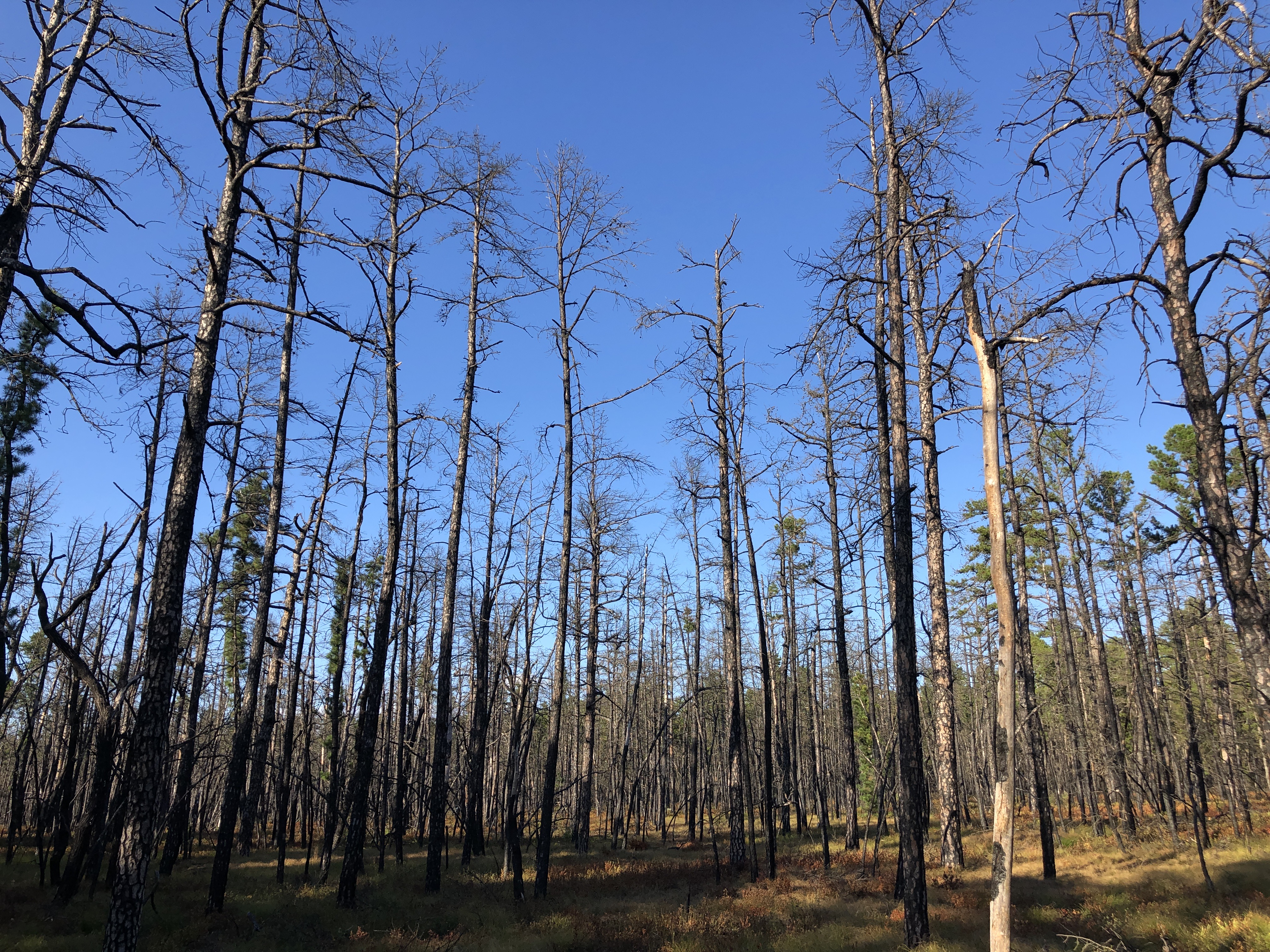
September 2024 view of an area severely affected by the fire. While many parts of the forest showed significant regrowth soon after the fire, certain areas affected by severe crown fire saw complete tree mortality even among Pinus rigida, which will require many years of recovery

The Mullica River fire was a 2022 wildfire in the Wharton State Forest in portions of Atlantic and Burlington counties in New Jersey. The fire began in a remote area of the Wharton State Forest, and firefighters suspect it was caused by an illegal campfire found near its origin; it was first spotted from a fire tower at 10 AM on Sunday, June 19. However, firefighters' initial attempt to extinguish the fire failed, partly because the inconvenient locations and poor condition of the roads around the fire made it difficult for firefighters to get to, and partly because dry weather and strong wind from the northwest helped the fire spread. By Tuesday, June 21, the fire had spread across parts of Washington and Shamong townships in Burlington County as well as Mullica Township and Hammonton in Atlantic County, while the wind carried ash from the fire as far south as Galloway Township and the smoke could be seen as far south as Ocean City. The fire burned some 15,000 acres. Trails and campgrounds as well as several roads in the affected area were closed during the fire, and about 50 people camping in the Wharton State Forest were evacuated, but nobody was injured or killed in the fire. The fire was mostly contained as of early June 23. Trees began to regrow in the area impacted by the fire in July 2022, as the ecosystem is adapted to occasional forest fires.
