= Sweetwater Casino =

Marina & Riverdeck located in Mullica Township, New Jersey

Coordinates: 39.622318°N 74.624679°W

Sweetwater Marina & Riverdeck
- Interactive map of Sweetwater Marina & Riverdeck

Restaurant information
- Established: 1927
- Owners: Mike and Kimmie Iles
- Location: 2780 7th Avenue, Sweetwater, Atlantic County, New Jersey, 08037, USA
- Seating capacity: 200
- Website: sweetwaterriverdeck.com

The Sweetwater Marina & Riverdeck, formerly known as the Sweetwater Casino, located in Mullica Township, New Jersey on the Mullica River and established in 1927, is known for its riverside deck, catering, event hosting, local nightlife, as well as being a gathering place for families to spend meals for generations. Never a real casino however, the Sweetwater was established by a local family as a restaurant in days before distance travel was common.

The Sweetwater was destroyed by a fire on June 30, 2008, ignited by a lightning strike in the early morning hours. Plans to reestablish the Sweetwater had been mired in legal and logistical delays. Currently the site is used for local festivals and other outdoor gatherings.

In 2016, the former Sweetwater Casino was purchased by locals Mike and Kimmie Iles. The Iles family began operating the property under a new name, the “Sweetwater Marina & Riverdeck.” From 2016-2019, the property was described as “a glorified party tent” with a large bar underneath and about 50 picnic tables out on the lawn.

Shortly after closing for the 2019 season, the Sweetwater crew began demolition and construction. The property now features two brand new, permanent structures. The smaller building is larger than the original tent to accommodate more people. The building also features multiple roll-up glass doors to merge the indoor and the outdoor dining areas. The larger building on the property houses the kitchen, offices and marina clubhouse. The second level of the building will be used as a large banquet facility, featuring views of the Mullica River.
