= Elwood, New Jersey =

Populated place in Atlantic County, New Jersey, US

- Census-designated place
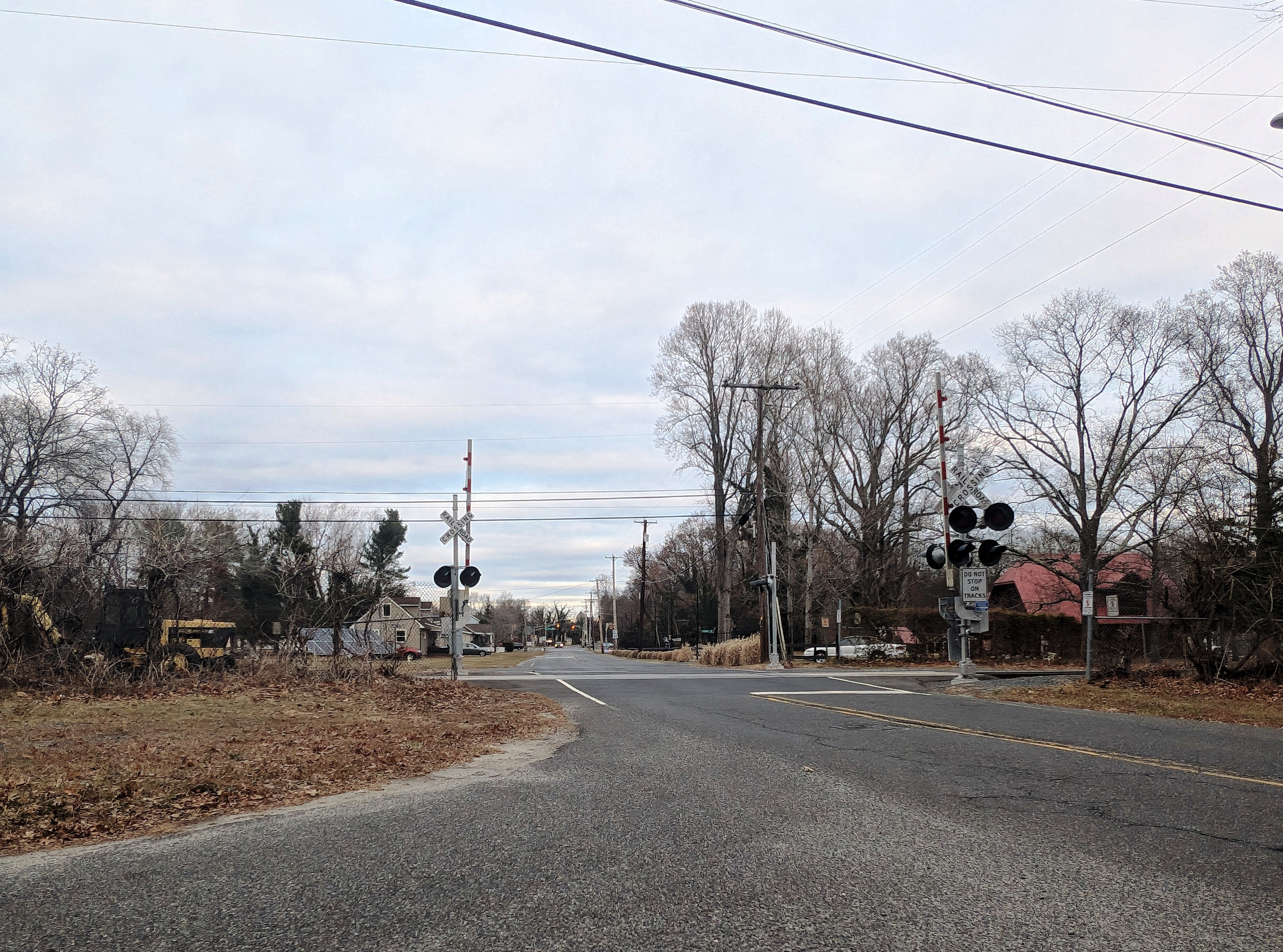
- Northbound Elwood Road (CR 623) in Elwood

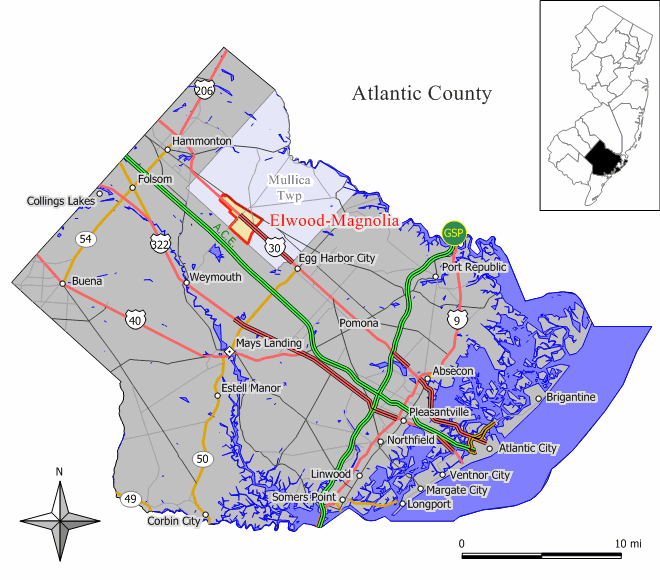
- Map of Elwood CDP in Atlantic County. Inset: Location of Atlantic County in New Jersey.

- Location in Atlantic County Location in New Jersey Location in the United States
- Coordinates: 39.569375°N 74.707921°W
- Country: United States
- State: New Jersey
- County: Atlantic
- Township: Mullica

Area
  - Total: 3.19 sq mi (8.27 km^{2})
  - Land: 3.19 sq mi (8.27 km^{2})
  - Water: 0 sq mi (0.00 km^{2}) 0.03%
- Elevation: 89 ft (27 m)

Population (2020)
  - Total: 1,215
  - Density: 380.6/sq mi (146.95/km^{2})
- Time zone: UTC−05:00 (Eastern (EST))
  - Summer (DST): UTC−04:00 (EDT)
- ZIP Code: 08217, 08037, 08215
- Area codes: 609, 640
- FIPS code: 34-21420
- GNIS feature ID: 02389040

Elwood is an unincorporated community and census-designated place (CDP) located within Mullica Township in Atlantic County, in the U.S. state of New Jersey. As of the 2020 census, Elwood had a population of 1,215. At previous censuses, the area was listed by the U.S. Census Bureau as the Elwood-Magnolia CDP. The area is served as United States Postal Service ZIP Code 08217.

== Geography ==
According to the United States Census Bureau, Elwood had a total area of 3.206 square miles (8.30 km^{2}), including 3.205 square miles (8.30 km^{2}) of land and 0.001 square miles (0.0026 km^{2}) of water (0.03%).

== Demographics ==
Historical population
Census	Pop.	Note	%±
1980	1,538		—
1990	1,487		−3.3%
2000	1,392		−6.4%
2010	1,437		3.2%
2020	1,215		−15.4%
Population sources: 1950 1960 1970; 1980 1990 2000; 2010 2020

Elwood first appeared as a census designated place under the name Elwood-Magnolia in the 1980 U.S. census; the name of the CDP was changed to Elwood prior to the 2010 U.S. census.

=== 2020 census ===
Elwood CDP, New Jersey – Racial and ethnic composition Note: the US Census treats Hispanic/Latino as an ethnic category. This table excludes Latinos from the racial categories and assigns them to a separate category. Hispanics/Latinos may be of any race.
Race / Ethnicity (NH = Non-Hispanic)	Pop 2000	Pop 2010	Pop 2020	% 2000	% 2010	% 2020
White alone (NH)	651	674	594	46.77%	46.90%	48.89%
Black or African American alone (NH)	180	151	92	12.93%	10.51%	7.57%
Native American or Alaska Native alone (NH)	3	5	0	0.22%	0.35%	0.00%
Asian alone (NH)	12	20	7	0.86%	1.39%	0.58%
Native Hawaiian or Pacific Islander alone (NH)	3	1	0	0.22%	0.07%	0.00%
Other race alone (NH)	3	3	12	0.22%	0.21%	0.99%
Mixed race or Multiracial (NH)	27	38	37	1.94%	2.64%	3.05%
Hispanic or Latino (any race)	513	545	473	36.85%	37.93%	38.93%
Total	1,392	1,437	1,215	100.00%	100.00%	100.00%

=== 2010 census ===
The 2010 United States census counted 1,437 people, 436 households, and 340 families in the CDP. The population density was 448.3 people per square mile (173.1 people/km^{2}). There were 477 housing units at an average density of 148.8 units per square mile (57.5 units/km^{2}). The racial makeup was 61.38% (882) White, 13.15% (189) Black or African American, 0.35% (5) Native American, 1.39% (20) Asian, 0.07% (1) Pacific Islander, 18.44% (265) from other races, and 5.22% (75) from two or more races. Hispanic or Latino of any race were 37.93% (545) of the population.

Of the 436 households, 35.8% had children under the age of 18; 54.4% were married couples living together; 14.4% had a female householder with no husband present and 22.0% were non-families. Of all households, 15.8% were made up of individuals and 5.7% had someone living alone who was 65 years of age or older. The average household size was 3.14 and the average family size was 3.50.

25.5% of the population were under the age of 18, 8.8% from 18 to 24, 24.5% from 25 to 44, 29.9% from 45 to 64, and 11.3% who were 65 years of age or older. The median age was 38.8 years. For every 100 females, the population had 102.7 males. For every 100 females ages 18 and older there were 101.3 males.

=== 2000 census ===
As of the 2000 United States census there were 1,392 people, 427 households, and 333 families living in the CDP. The population density was 166.9 people/km^{2} (432 people/mi^{2}). There were 453 housing units at an average density of 54.3 units/km^{2} (141 units/mi^{2}). The racial makeup of the CDP was 56.75% White, 13.79% African American, 0.36% Native American, 0.86% Asian, 0.22% Pacific Islander, 23.13% from other races, and 4.89% from two or more races. Hispanic or Latino of any race were 36.85% of the population.

There were 427 households, out of which 39.8% had children under the age of 18 living with them, 56.0% were married couples living together, 15.0% had a female householder with no husband present, and 21.8% were non-families. 16.9% of all households were made up of individuals, and 6.8% had someone living alone who was 65 years of age or older. The average household size was 3.17 and the average family size was 3.55.

In the CDP the population was spread out, with 30.2% under the age of 18, 8.7% from 18 to 24, 30.0% from 25 to 44, 22.8% from 45 to 64, and 8.4% who were 65 years of age or older. The median age was 34 years. For every 100 females, there were 101.2 males. For every 100 females age 18 and over, there were 97.2 males.

The median income for a household in the CDP was $42,105, and the median income for a family was $44,688. Males had a median income of $31,516 versus $24,167 for females. The per capita income for the CDP was $13,678. About 22.4% of families and 24.5% of the population were below the poverty line, including 42.0% of those under age 18 and 27.3% of those age 65 or over.

== Education ==
The CDP is within two school districts: Mullica Township School District (elementary) and Greater Egg Harbor Regional High School District. The zoned high school for Mullica Township is Cedar Creek High School, which is a part of the Greater Egg Harbor district.
