= Mike Isgro =

American football coach (born c. 1988)

Current position
- Title: Special teams coordinator, pass game coordinator & wide receivers coach
- Team: West Chester
- Conference: PSAC

Biographical details
- Born: c. 1988 (age 37–38); Galloway Township, New Jersey, U.S.
- Education: Delaware Valley University (2010)

Playing career

Football
- 2006–2009: Delaware Valley
- Position: Quarterback

Coaching career (HC unless noted)

Football
- 2010–2014: Cedar Creek HS (NJ) (OC/QB)
- 2015–2023: Delaware Valley (STC/RB/RC)
- 2024–2025: Delaware Valley
- 2026–present: West Chester (STC/PGC/WR)

Baseball
- 2011–2015: Cedar Creek HS (NJ)

Head coaching record
- Overall: 16–6 (college football)
- Bowls: 1–1

Michael Isgro (born c. 1988) is an American college football coach. He is the special teams coordinator, pass game coordinator and wide receivers coach for West Chester University, positions he has held since 2026. He was the head football coach for Delaware Valley University, a position he held from 2024 until 2025. He also coached football for Cedar Creek High School. He played college football for Delaware Valley as a quarterback.

Raised in Galloway Township, New Jersey, Isgro attended Absegami High School.

== Head coaching record ==
=== College football ===
Year	Team	Overall	Conference	Standing	Bowl/playoffs
Delaware Valley Aggies (Middle Atlantic Conference) (2024–2025)
2024	Delaware Valley	8–3	7–2	2nd	L Centennial-MAC
2025	Delaware Valley	8–3	7–2	T–2nd	W Centennial-MAC
Delaware Valley:		16–6	14–4		
Total:		16–6			
