= Day Gardner =

American model

Day Deborah Rica Lipford, now Day Gardner, is a former Miss Atlantic City, (1974) who served as Miss Delaware in 1976 and made history by becoming the first African American contestant to place as a top ten semi-finalist at the Miss America 1977 pageant.

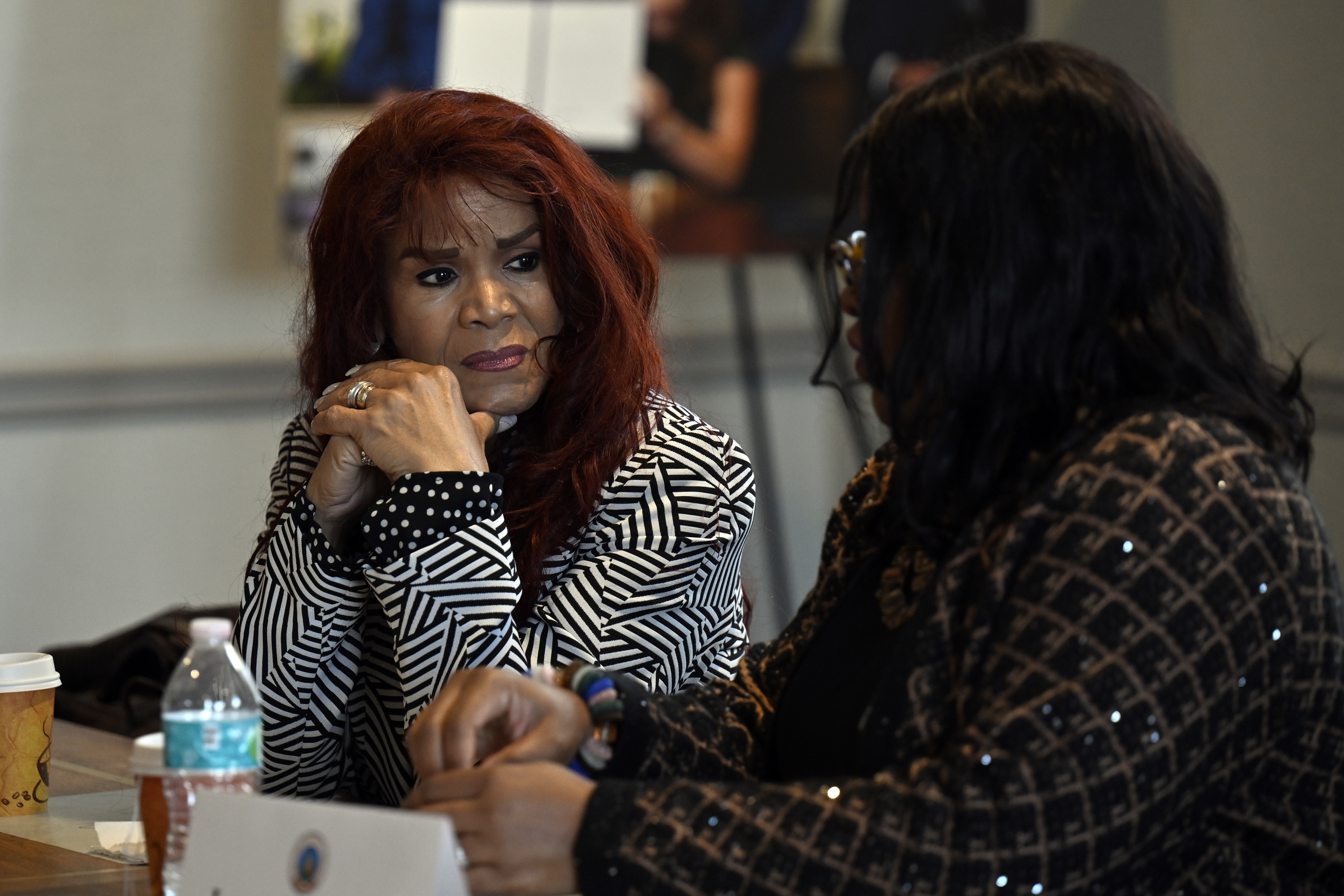
Day in 2026

== Early life ==
She was raised in the Elwood section of Mullica Township, New Jersey. Hoagy Lands, a soul singer during the 1960s, was her uncle. Her first cousin is the mother of singer Jaheim. In 1973, she graduated from Oakcrest High School in Hamilton Township, New Jersey.

== Career ==
She was president and director of Lipford Corporation during which she designed SandCastle Entertainment Complex, a $40 million dinner theater and nightclub facility located in the center of Guam's tourist district. Gardner worked as a media consultant KUAM Broadcasting in Ordot, Guam and upon returning to the U.S. Mainland was an on-air personality and producer with African Broadcasting at the World Trade Center in New York City. She is the former National Director of Black Americans for Life, in Washington, D.C., an affiliate of the National Right to Life Committee.

In 2017, she was nominated by Maryland governor Larry Hogan to be a consumer member of the Maryland Board of Physicians. In March 2017, she was pressured by the Maryland Senate over her pro-life views. The governor's office withdrew the nomination due to criticism from Democrats the Governor received regarding Gardner's pro life stance and how doctors should face the issue. She was also criticized for sharing the debunked conspiracy theory regarding the birthplace of former President Of The United States Barack Obama.

Gardner is the founder and president of The National Black Pro Life Union and associate director of National Pro-Life Center on Capitol Hill. She was also the anchor for the 'Daily Life News with Day Gardner' program for NPLR.net online and later host of 'The Day Report' for American Family Radio.

In January 2011, Day Gardner received a Doctorate Degree from Faith Evangelical College and Seminary in Tacoma, Washington. Gardner's first novel, If Not For Grace was published in the spring of 2011 and is available in book stores and online.

Awards and achievements
Preceded by Elaine Campanelli	Miss Delaware; 1976	Succeeded by Sandra Louise Aiken
