= Mullica Township Schools =

School district in Atlantic County, New Jersey, US

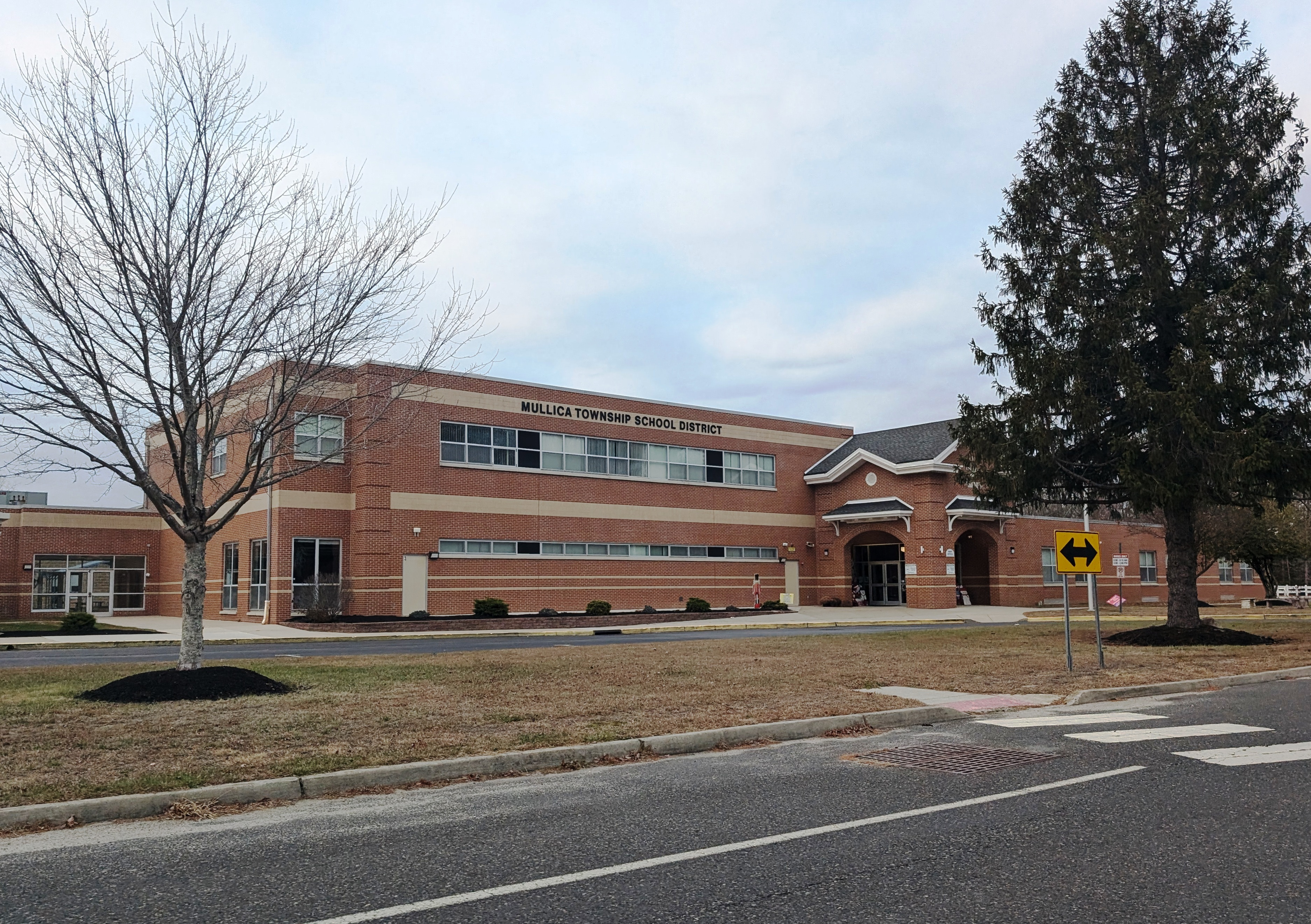
- District offices

Address
- 500 Elwood Road Elwood, Atlantic County, New Jersey, 08217; United States
- Coordinates: 39.576328°N 74.715942°W

District information
- Grades: Pre-K to 8
- President: Susan Brownhill
- Vice-president: Catherine Werner
- Superintendent: Dr. Jennifer R. Pauls
- Business administrator: Karen Gfroehrer
- Schools: 2

Students and staff
- Enrollment: 652 (as of 2020–21)
- Faculty: 56.7 FTEs
- Student–teacher ratio: 11.5:1

Other information
- Website: www.mullicaschools.com
Ind.	Per pupil	District spending	Rank (*)	K-8 average	%± vs. average
1A	Total Spending	$16,689	17	$18,891	−11.7%
1	Budgetary Cost	12,397	14	14,159	−12.4%
2	Classroom Instruction	8,119	23	8,659	−6.2%
6	Support Services	1,488	7	2,167	−31.3%
8	Administrative Cost	1,417	15	1,547	−8.4%
10	Operations & Maintenance	1,319	18	1,612	−18.2%
13	Extracurricular Activities	32	4	104	−69.2%
16	Median Teacher Salary	62,785	38	61,136
Data from NJDoE 2014 Taxpayers' Guide to Education Spending. *Of K-8 districts with 401-750 students. Lowest spending=1; Highest=64

The Mullica Township Schools is a community public school district that serves students in pre-kindergarten through eighth grade from Mullica Township, in Atlantic County, in the U.S. state of New Jersey.

As of the 2020–21 school year, the district, comprising two schools, had an enrollment of 652 students and 56.7 classroom teachers (on an FTE basis), for a student–teacher ratio of 11.5:1.

The Mullica Township Board of Education voted in November 2009 to close the Hilda E. Frame School, which had served pre-kindergarten students. The reasons cited included declining enrollment which allowed the students which were at Frame to attend the regular elementary school facility.

Starting in the 2007-08 school year, as part of an agreement with the Washington Township School District, Green Bank Elementary School received additional teaching support from the Mullica district and shares its superintendent and business administrator. Starting in the 2010-11 school year, Washington Township students in grades six through eight started attending Mullica Township Middle School. With the start of the 2016-17 school year, the Washington Township School District no longer operates and all students from Washington Township attend the Mullica Township Schools as part of a full sending/receiving relationship.

The district is classified by the New Jersey Department of Education as being in District Factor Group "B", the second-lowest of eight groupings. District Factor Groups organize districts statewide to allow comparison by common socioeconomic characteristics of the local districts. From lowest socioeconomic status to highest, the categories are A, B, CD, DE, FG, GH, I and J.

Students in ninth through twelfth grades attend Cedar Creek High School, which is located in the northern section of Egg Harbor City and opened to students in September 2010. The school is one of three high schools operated as part of the Greater Egg Harbor Regional High School District, which is comprised of the constituent municipalities of Egg Harbor City, Galloway Township and Hamilton Township, and participates in sending/receiving relationships with Port Republic and Washington Township (Burlington County). Cedar Creek High School is zoned to serve students from Egg Harbor City, Mullica Township, Port Republic and Washington Township, while students in portions of Galloway and Hamilton townships have the opportunity to attend Cedar Creek through the school of choice program or through attendance in magnet programs offered at Cedar Creek. As of the 2020–21 school year, the high school had an enrollment of 935 students and 74.8 classroom teachers (on an FTE basis), for a student–teacher ratio of 12.5:1.

== Schools ==
Schools in the district (with 2020–21 enrollment data from the National Center for Education Statistics.) are:

Primary school

- Mullica Township Primary School with 331 students in grades PreK - 4
- Principal - Janine Gentilini

Middle school

- Mullica Township Middle School with 320 students in grades 5 - 8
  - Principal - Kevin Lightcap

== Administration ==
NAME	TITLE
Jennifer R. Pauls, Ed. D	Superintendent
Janine Gentilini	Primary School Principal
Kevin Lightcap	Middle School Principal
Maris Lynn	Director of Student Services and Programming

== Board of education ==
The district's board of education, comprised of nine members, sets policy and oversees the fiscal and educational operation of the district through its administration. As a Type II school district, the board's trustees are elected directly by voters to serve three-year terms of office on a staggered basis, with three seats up for election each year held (since 2012) as part of the November general election. The board appoints a superintendent to oversee the district's day-to-day operations and a business administrator to supervise the business functions of the district.

=== Members - ===
NAME	TITLE	TERM
Jennifer R. Pauls, Ed. D	Superintendent	N/A
Karen Gfroehrer	Interim Business Administrator	N/A
Susan Brownhill	President	January 1, 2024 - December 31, 2026
Catherine Werner	Vice-President	January 1, 2025 - December 31, 2027
Dawn Stollenwerk	Treasurer	N/A
Angela Maione	Board Member	January 1, 2025 - December 31, 2027
Chantay Lynch	Board Member	January 1, 2026 - December 31, 2028
Sarah Kurtz	Board Member	January 1, 2024 - December 31, 2026
Bob Stollenwerk	Board Member	January 1, 2026 - December 31, 2028
Nick Roehnert	Board Member	January 1, 2024 - December 31, 2026
Mark F. Winterbottom	Board Member	January 1, 2024 - December 31, 2026
Joy Wyld	Board Member	January 1, 2025 - December 31, 2027

== District Calendar ==
2026 -2027 - https://mullicaschools.com/wp-content/uploads/2026/03/2026-2027-Mullica-Twp.-District-Calendar.pdf
