= Randolph Township, Burlington County, New Jersey =

Randolph Township is a former township in Burlington County, New Jersey, United States, that lasted for 23 years after splitting off from and being reannexed by Washington Township, Burlington County, New Jersey.

Randolph was incorporated as a township by an Act of the New Jersey Legislature on March 17, 1870, from portions of Washington Township and was reannexed to Washington Township on March 28, 1893.

Historical population
Census	Pop.	Note	%±
1870	450		—
1880	428		−4.9%
1890	302		−29.4%
Population sources: 1870-1890 1880-1890
