= Sweetwater Canal =

Sweetwater Canal can mean:

- The Sweet Water Canal in Egypt running eastwards from the Nile near Cairo to the south end of the Suez Canal
- A canal near Basra in Iraq
