= Sweetwater River =

Sweetwater River may refer to:

- Sweetwater River (California), a river in San Diego County, California, USA

(includes the North Fork Sweetwater River)

- Sweetwater River (Wyoming), a river in Natrona County, Wyoming, USA

(includes the East Sweetwater River and the Little Sweetwater River; both in Fremont County)

== See also ==
- Sweetwater Creek (disambiguation)
