= Sweetwater Creek (Logan Creek tributary) =

Stream in the American state of Missouri

Sweetwater Creek is a stream in western Reynolds and northeastern Shannon counties of the Ozarks of southern Missouri. It is a tributary of the Logan Creek.

The stream headwaters are in Shannon County at 37°22′42″N 91°10′59″W and the confluence with Logan Creek in Reynolds County is at 37°19′06″N 91°07′29″W.

According to historian Mayme Lucille Hamlett (citing W.A. Williams, then the Reynolds County superintendent of schools), Sweetwater Creek was so named on account of the hard water the stream contains, as "Hard water is often described as sweet water."

== See also ==
- List of rivers of Missouri
