= Israel Helm =

Israel Helm (c. 1630- c. 1701) was a colonist and soldier in New Sweden who became one of the first settlers in the area of Philadelphia, PA.

== Biography ==
Israel Åkesson was born around 1630 and would later adopt the surname Helm. He came to New Sweden with his father, Åke Vilhelm Karl Israelson, in 1641. His father died during the trip and he probably became a ward of Governor Printz when he arrived at New Sweden in 1643. He became a soldier in 1648, and accompanied Printz back to Sweden in this capacity in 1653.

The Swedish settlement was incorporated into New Netherland in 1655. Åkesson subsequently returned and probably settled on Tinicum Island in Pennsylvania. The island was sold to Dutch merchant Joost de la Grange (1623–1664) in 1662. Åkesson later traveled back to Sweden where he recruited settlers and returned with them in 1663. Thirty-two Finns arrived on board the "Purmerlander Kerck " and were settled at Feren Hook on south side of Christina River.

As a reward, he received from the Dutch governor a monopoly on the fur trade in Pennsylvania and in 1664 was entitled to become a justice replacing Mats Hansson (1612–1663) on the Upland Court where he served until 1681. By this time, his military rank had risen to captain, and he had adopted the surname Helm.

In his trading with the local American Indians, he learned their language, and was frequently employed as an interpreter. He acted as such in 1675 at the conference between English Gov. Sir Edmund Andros, the magistrates of New Castle, Delaware, and the Lenape sachems of New Jersey, when their treaty of peace was renewed.

In 1677, he was living in Gloucester County, New Jersey, where he remained for the rest of his life. He died during 1701 and was buried with his wife on Tinicum Island.
