= Sweetwater Creek (Echeconnee Creek tributary) =

Stream in Georgia, U.S.

Coordinates: 32°46′49.51″N 83°51′7.67″W

Sweetwater Creek is a stream in the U.S. state of Georgia. It is a tributary to Echeconnee Creek.

Sweetwater Creek received its name in the 1770s, most likely for the fresh water which flows there.
