= Sweetwater Creek (Flint River tributary) =

Stream in Georgia, U.S.

Coordinates: 32°10′57.59″N 84°2′38.66″W

Sweetwater Creek is a stream in the U.S. state of Georgia. It is a tributary to the Flint River.

According to tradition, Sweetwater Creek received its name when a quantity of cane syrup accidentally was spilled into its waters.
