= Mullica River =

River in New Jersey, United States

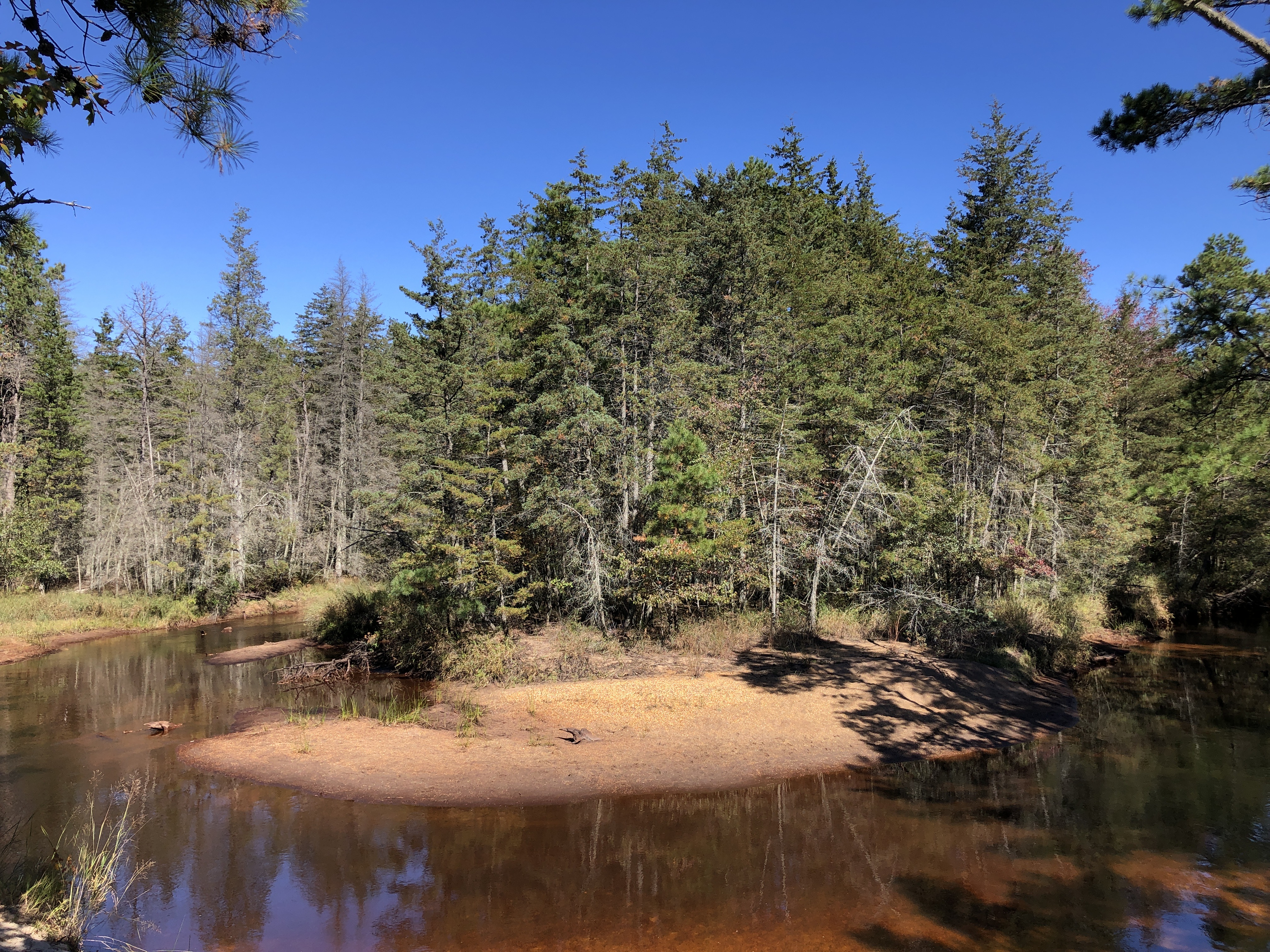

- Location within New Jersey
- Etymology: Named after Eric Pålsson Mullica

Physical characteristics
- Source
  - location: Camden County
  - coordinates: 39.7901°N 74.9129°W
- Mouth: Great Bay (New Jersey)
  - location: Little Egg Harbor Township, New Jersey
  - coordinates: 39.5507°N 74.3761°W
- Length: 50.6 miles (81.4 km)

The Mullica River is a 50.6-mile-long (81.4 km) river in southern New Jersey in the United States. The Mullica was once known as the Little Egg Harbor River.

The river provides one of the principal drainages into the Atlantic Ocean of the extensive Pinelands. Its estuary on Great Bay is considered one of the least-disturbed marine wetlands habitats in the northeastern United States.

In 2022, the Mullica River Fire consumed an estimated 13,500 acres (55 km^{2}) of the related Wharton State Forest.

== Course ==
The Mullica rises in central Camden County, near Berlin, on the southeastern fringes of the New Jersey suburbs of Philadelphia. It flows generally east-southeast across the state, crossing the Wharton State Forest and forming most of the boundary between Atlantic and Burlington County. Near The Forks, where it receives the Batsto River, the Mullica broadens into a navigable river approximately 20 miles (32 km) long, stretching east-southeast and emptying into Great Bay approximately 10 miles (16 km) north of Atlantic City. It becomes brackish below the bridge at Green Bank. Approximately 3 miles (5 km) upstream from its mouth on Great Bay, it receives the estuary of the Wading River from the north. Approximately 2 miles (3 km) upstream from its mouth, it receives the Bass River from the north. The watershed drained by the river and its tributaries measures approximately 568 square miles, and is composed primarily of pine forests and scrub habitat.

The estuary is crossed by the Garden State Parkway and US 9 near its mouth. The lower reaches of the river form an extensive wetlands area, which is protected on its southern bank as the Edwin B. Forsythe National Wildlife Refuge.

== Wildlife ==
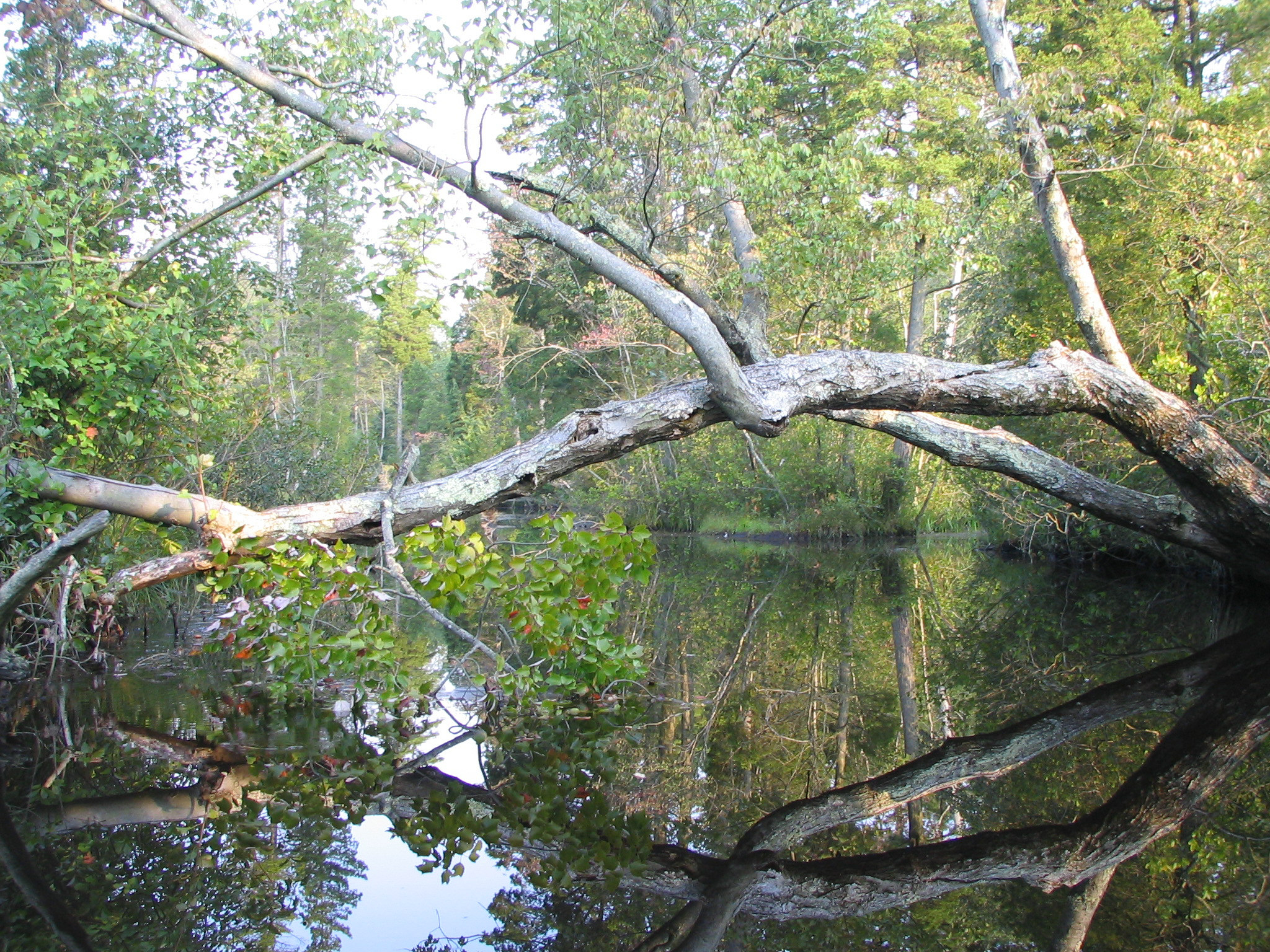
Mullica River northwest of Lake Atsion

Freshwater portions are also home to healthy populations of white catfish, pickerel, white perch, crappie, white sucker, and largemouth bass. Brackish and saltwater portions of the river are inhabited by weakfish, winter flounder, bluefish, American eel, and summer flounder. Blue claw crabs are prevalent in the lower reaches of the river and in tributaries flowing through the surrounding salt marshes. These tidal creeks also support populations of the northern diamondback terrapin, which is listed by the federal government as a species of special concern.

The river also provides a habitat for a broad assortment of nesting and migratory birds. Species of note include the common tern, black skimmer, laughing gull, piping plover, least tern, great black-backed gull, osprey, great egret, black-crowned night heron, clapper rail, Virginia rail, merlin, and marsh wren, among others. Canada geese, American black ducks, mallards, tundra swans, northern pintails, and other migratory birds are often observed in the river estuary.

== Name ==
The river is named after Eric Pålsson Mullica, early Swedish settler (with Finnish ancestry) born in 1636 who founded a homestead on the river after moving there from the vicinity of Philadelphia. The settlement was located about 15 miles (24 km) upstream from the mouth near present-day Lower Bank. For many years it was known as the Little Egg Harbor River ('Little' to disambiguate it from the Great Egg Harbor River to its south); before European colonization, the Lenape called it the Amintonck.

== Tributaries ==
- Judies Creek
- Roundabout Creek
- Ballanger Creek
- Big Graveling Creek
- Nacote Creek
- Bass River
- Wading River
- Big Creek
- Fence Creek
- Jerry Creek
- Turtle Creek
- Tar Kiln Branch
- Teal Creek
- Landing Creek
- Becky Lane Creek
- Stump Creek
- Pine Creek
- Cedar Creek
- Negro Creek
- Little Bull Creek
- Bull Creek
- Hatch's Creek
- First Branch
- Batsto River
- Nescochague Creek
- Sleeper Branch
- Alquatka Branch

== See also ==
- List of New Jersey rivers
- Mullica Hill, New Jersey, a census-designated place located within Harrison Township, New Jersey, in Gloucester County
- Mullica Township, New Jersey, a township in Atlantic County, New Jersey
