= Mullica Township, New Jersey =

Township in Atlantic County, New Jersey, US

- Township
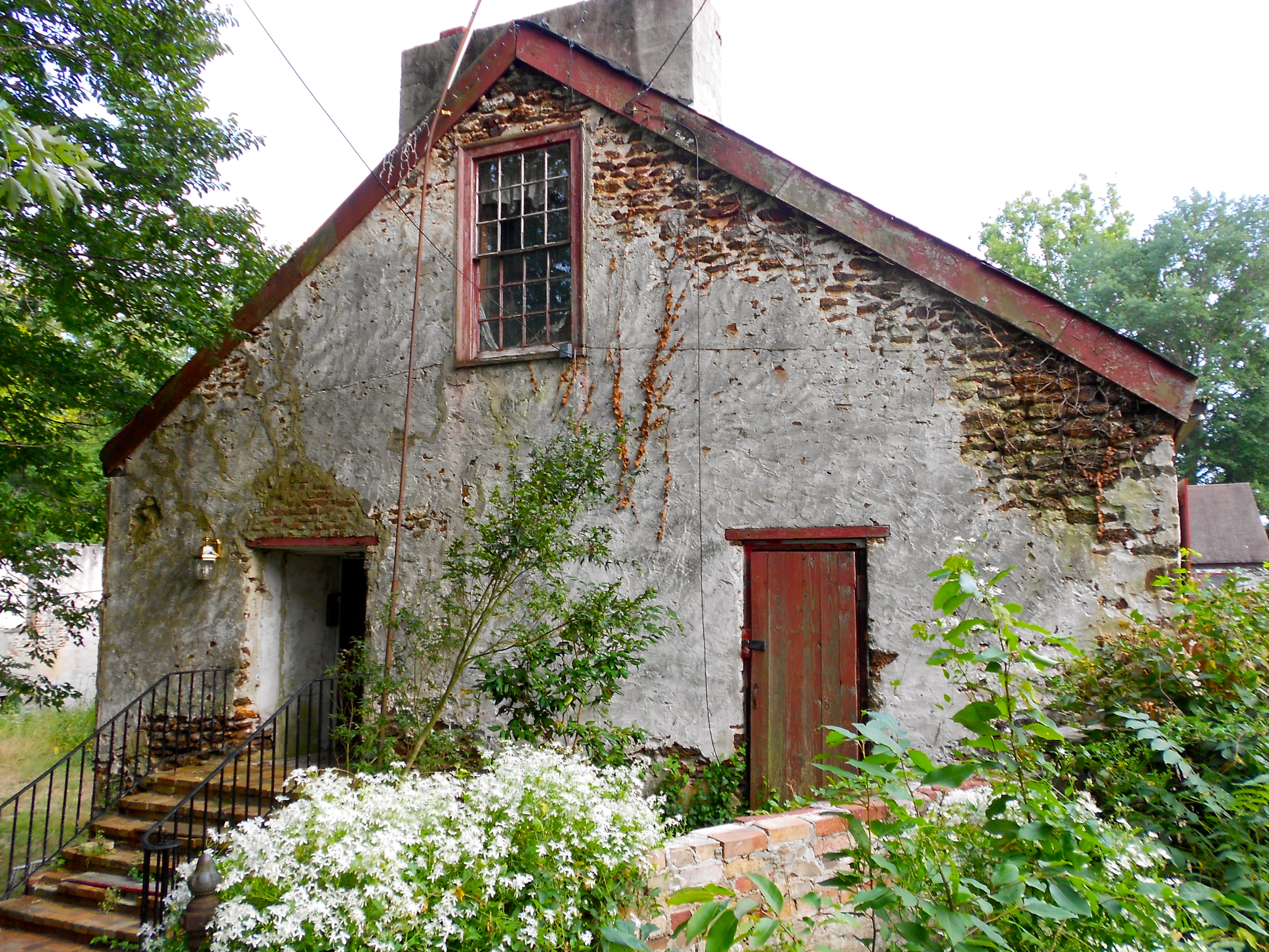
- Pleasant Mills

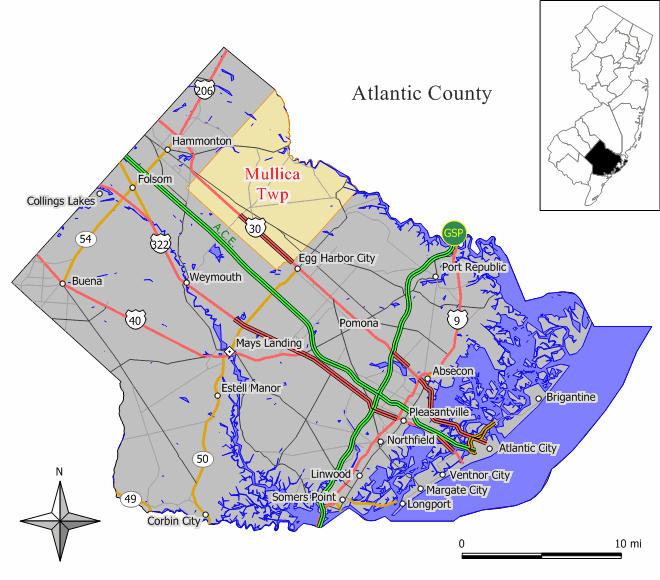
- Map of Mullica Township in Atlantic County. Inset: Location of Atlantic County highlighted in the State of New Jersey.

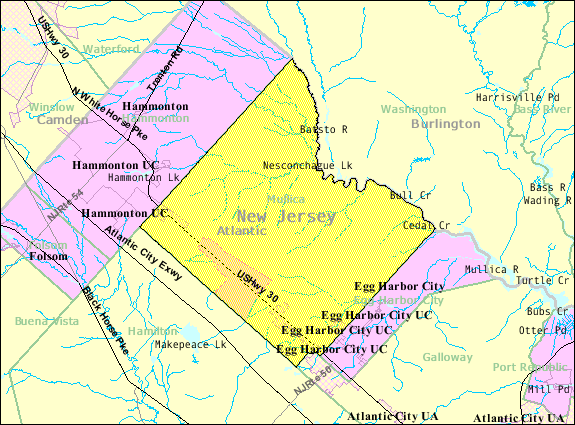
- Census Bureau map of Mullica Township, New Jersey

- Location in Atlantic County Location in New Jersey Location in the United States
- Coordinates: 39.596486°N 74.6765°W
- Country: United States
- State: New Jersey
- County: Atlantic
- Incorporated: March 13, 1838
- Named for: Eric Pålsson Mullica

Government
  - Type: Township
  - Body: Township Committee
  - Mayor: Edward Hagaman (R, term ends December 31, 2027)
  - Municipal clerk: Krystel Arana

Area
  - Total: 56.84 sq mi (147.22 km^{2})
  - Land: 56.37 sq mi (146.01 km^{2})
  - Water: 0.47 sq mi (1.21 km^{2}) 0.82%
  - Rank: 25th of 565 in state 4th of 23 in county
- Elevation: 56 ft (17 m)

Population (2020)
  - Total: 5,816
  - Estimate (2023): 5,802
  - Rank: 356th of 565 in state 14th of 23 in county
  - Density: 103.2/sq mi (39.8/km^{2})
  - Rank: 540th of 565 in state 21st of 23 in county
- Time zone: UTC−05:00 (Eastern (EST))
  - Summer (DST): UTC−04:00 (Eastern (EDT))
- ZIP Code: 08217 – Elwood
- Area code: 609
- FIPS code: 3400149410
- GNIS feature ID: 0882053
- Website: www.mullicatownship.org

Mullica Township is a township in Atlantic County, in the U.S. state of New Jersey. As of the 2020 United States census, the township's population was 5,816, a decrease of 331 (−5.4%) from the 2010 census count of 6,147, which in turn reflected an increase of 235 (+4.0%) from the 5,912 counted in the 2000 census. Geographically, the township, and all of Atlantic County, is part of the South Jersey region of the state and of the Atlantic City-Hammonton metropolitan statistical area, which in turn is included in the Philadelphia metropolitan area.

Mullica Township was incorporated as a township by an act of the New Jersey Legislature on March 13, 1838, from the western section of Galloway Township. Egg Harbor City was created from portions of the township on June 14, 1858, while the Town of Hammonton was created and split off on March 5, 1866.

The township and its river were named after Eric Pålsson Mullica, early Swedish settler (with Finnish ancestry) born in 1636 who founded a homestead on the river after moving there from the vicinity of Philadelphia, and who later moved to Mullica Hill in Gloucester County. When used as a common noun, mullikka is the Finnish term for a bull calf.

== Geography ==
According to the United States Census Bureau, the township had a total area of 56.84 square miles (147.22 km^{2}), including 56.38 square miles (146.01 km^{2}) of land and 0.47 square miles (1.21 km^{2}) of water (0.82%).

Despite a relatively small population, Mullica Township comprises many small communities. Elwood (with a 2020 Census population of 1,215), Nesco (422), and Sweetwater (805) are unincorporated communities and census-designated places (CDP) located within Mullica Township.

Other unincorporated communities, localities and place names located partially or completely within the township include Amatol, Colwell, Da Costa, Devonshire, East Hammonton, Indian Cabin, New Columbia, Pleasant Mills, Speedway, Weekstown, Wescoatville, West Egg Harbor and Woodland. Unincorporated communities in Mullica Township are largely identified by landmarks such as the Elwood Deli, the Sweetwater Casino, or the Weekstown Firehouse. The small unincorporated communities within the township engender a particularly high level of pride, and many Mullica Township residents refer to themselves as residents of their unincorporated community, before referring to themselves as residents of Mullica Township.

The township is located in the northwest portion of Atlantic County. It is bounded on the north by Washington Township in Burlington County (which is separated from it by the Mullica River); on the east by Egg Harbor City; on the south by Galloway Township and Hamilton Township; and on the west by the Town of Hammonton. The Township is approximately 13 miles (21 km) outside of Atlantic City and 40 miles (64 km) outside of Philadelphia.

The township is one of 56 South Jersey municipalities that are included within the New Jersey Pinelands National Reserve, a protected natural area of unique ecology covering 1,100,000 acres (450,000 ha), that has been classified as a United States Biosphere Reserve and established by Congress in 1978 as the nation's first National Reserve. All of the township is included in the state-designated Pinelands Area, which includes portions of Atlantic County, along with areas in Burlington, Camden, Cape May, Cumberland, Gloucester and Ocean counties.

== Demographics ==
Historical population
Census	Pop.	Note	%±
1840	1,056		—
1850	918		−13.1%
1860	1,600	*	74.3%
1870	861	*	−46.2%
1880	717		−16.7%
1890	697		−2.8%
1900	880		26.3%
1910	811		−7.8%
1920	1,166		43.8%
1930	1,425		22.2%
1940	1,500		5.3%
1950	1,804		20.3%
1960	2,944		63.2%
1970	3,391		15.2%
1980	5,243		54.6%
1990	5,896		12.5%
2000	5,912		0.3%
2010	6,147		4.0%
2020	5,816		−5.4%
2023 (est.)	5,802		−0.2%
Population sources: 1840–2000; 1840–1920 1840 1850–1870; 1850 1870 1880–1890; 1890–1910 1910–1930; 1940–2000 2000; 2010 2020 * = Lost territory in previous decade.

=== 2010 census ===
The 2010 United States census counted 6,147 people, 2,154 households, and 1,631 families in the township. The population density was 108.9 per square mile (42.0/km^{2}). There were 2,360 housing units at an average density of 41.8 per square mile (16.1/km^{2}). The racial makeup was 83.26% (5,118) White, 5.68% (349) Black or African American, 0.23% (14) Native American, 0.68% (42) Asian, 0.03% (2) Pacific Islander, 7.19% (442) from other races, and 2.93% (180) from two or more races. Hispanic or Latino of any race were 17.02% (1,046) of the population.

Of the 2,154 households, 30.5% had children under the age of 18; 57.4% were married couples living together; 11.7% had a female householder with no husband present and 24.3% were non-families. Of all households, 18.4% were made up of individuals and 8.4% had someone living alone who was 65 years of age or older. The average household size was 2.81 and the average family size was 3.19.

23.1% of the population were under the age of 18, 8.2% from 18 to 24, 23.5% from 25 to 44, 31.9% from 45 to 64, and 13.3% who were 65 years of age or older. The median age was 41.7 years. For every 100 females, the population had 100.6 males. For every 100 females ages 18 and older there were 100.1 males.

The Census Bureau's 2006–2010 American Community Survey showed that (in 2010 inflation-adjusted dollars) median household income was $54,730 (with a margin of error of +/− $11,733) and the median family income was $62,000 (+/− $10,758). Males had a median income of $42,931 (+/− $9,882) versus $41,716 (+/− $5,514) for females. The per capita income for the township was $26,217 (+/− $3,264). About 3.6% of families and 6.5% of the population were below the poverty line, including 8.1% of those under age 18 and 5.4% of those age 65 or over.

=== 2000 census ===
As of the 2000 United States census there were 5,912 people, 2,044 households, and 1,537 families residing in the township. The population density was 104.5 inhabitants per square mile (40.3/km^{2}). There were 2,176 housing units at an average density of 38.5 per square mile (14.9/km^{2}). The racial makeup of the township was 80.58% White, 6.28% African American, 0.27% Native American, 0.83% Asian, 0.12% Pacific Islander, 8.61% from other races, and 3.32% from two or more races. Hispanic or Latino of any race were 16.49% of the population.

There were 2,044 households, out of which 35.9% had children under the age of 18 living with them, 59.6% were married couples living together, 10.0% had a female householder with no husband present, and 24.8% were non-families. 19.4% of all households were made up of individuals, and 7.9% had someone living alone who was 65 years of age or older. The average household size was 2.87 and the average family size was 3.30.

In the township the population was spread out, with 27.0% under the age of 18, 7.4% from 18 to 24, 31.1% from 25 to 44, 23.9% from 45 to 64, and 10.7% who were 65 years of age or older. The median age was 37 years. For every 100 females, there were 101.3 males. For every 100 females age 18 and over, there were 101.1 males.

The median income for a household in the township was $50,417, and the median income for a family was $55,143. Males had a median income of $40,033 versus $29,965 for females. The per capita income for the township was $19,764. About 5.7% of families and 7.8% of the population were below the poverty line, including 11.3% of those under age 18 and 10.8% of those age 65 or over.

== Government ==
=== Local government ===
Mullica Township is governed under the Township form of New Jersey municipal government, which is used in 141 municipalities (of the 564) statewide, the second-most commonly used form of government in the state. The Township Committee is comprised of five members, who are elected directly by the voters at-large in partisan elections to serve three-year terms of office on a staggered basis, with either one or two seats coming up for election each year as part of the November general election in a three-year cycle. The mayor and deputy mayor are selected at an annual reorganization meeting by the Committee from among its members to serve terms of one year. The mayor presides over Township Committee meetings.

As of 2024, members of the Mullica Township Committee are Mayor Edward Hagaman (R, term on committee ends December 31, 2027; term as mayor ends 2024), Deputy Mayor Deanna DeMarco (R, term on committee ends 2025; term as deputy mayor ends 2024), Mark Pino (D, 2028), Charles Muller (R, 2026) and Glenn Forman (R, 2027).

In June 2019, the Township Committee selected Bruce Crowe from a list of three names nominated by the Republican municipal committee to fill the seat expiring in December 2021 that had been held by William Cornell until he resigned from office the previous month. In the November 2019 general election, Crowe was elected to serve the balance of the term of office.

=== Federal, state and county representation ===
Mullica Township is located in the 2nd Congressional District and is part of New Jersey's 8th state legislative district.

For the 119th United States Congress, New Jersey's 2nd congressional district is represented by Jeff Van Drew (R, Dennis Township). New Jersey is represented in the United States Senate by Democrats Cory Booker (Newark, term ends 2027) and Andy Kim (Moorestown, term ends 2031).

For the 2026–2027 session, the 8th legislative district of the New Jersey Legislature is represented in the New Jersey Senate by Latham Tiver (R, Southampton Township) and in the General Assembly by Anthony Angelozzi (D, Hammonton) and Andrea Katz (D, Chesterfield Township).

Atlantic County is governed by a directly elected county executive and a nine-member Board of County Commissioners, responsible for legislation. The executive serves a four-year term and the commissioners are elected to staggered three-year terms, of which four are elected from the county on an at-large basis and five of the commissioners represent equally populated districts. As of 2025, Atlantic County's Executive is Dennis Levinson (R, Northfield), whose term of office ends December 31, 2027. Members of the Board of County Commissioners are:

Ernest D. Coursey (D, District 1-- Atlantic City, Egg Harbor Township (part), Longport, Margate City, and Ventnor City; 2025, Atlantic City), Chair Maureen Kern (R, District 2-- Egg Harbor Township (part), Linwood, Northfield, Somers Point and Pleasantville; 2027, Somers Point), Andrew Parker III (R, District 3-- Egg Harbor Township (part) and Hamilton Township (part); 2026, Egg Harbor Township), Richard R. Dase (R, District 4, including Brigantine, Galloway Township, Egg Harbor Township (part), and Port Republic; 2025, Galloway Township), Vice Chair James A. Bertino (R, District 5-- Buena, Buena Vista Township, Corbin City, Egg Harbor City, Estell Manor, Folsom, Hamilton Township (part), Hammonton, Mullica Township and Weymouth Township; 2027, Hammonton), June Byrnes (R, At-Large; 2026, Linwood), Michael Ruffu (R, At-Large; Margate, 2027) Amy L. Gatto (R, At-large; 2025, Hamilton Township) and John W. Risley (R, At-Large; 2026, Egg Harbor Township)

Atlantic County's constitutional officers are: Clerk Joesph J. Giralo (R, 2026, Hammonton), Sheriff Joe O'Donoghue (R, 2026, Egg Harbor Township) and Surrogate James Curcio (R, 2025, Hammonton).

=== Politics ===
As of March 2011, there were a total of 4,077 registered voters in Mullica Township, of which 917 (22.5% vs. 30.5% countywide) were registered as Democrats, 1,336 (32.8% vs. 25.2%) were registered as Republicans and 1,821 (44.7% vs. 44.3%) were registered as Unaffiliated. There were 3 voters registered as Libertarians or Greens. Among the township's 2010 Census population, 66.3% (vs. 58.8% in Atlantic County) were registered to vote, including 86.3% of those ages 18 and over (vs. 76.6% countywide).

Gubernatorial election results for Mullica Township
Year	Republican		Democratic		Third party(ies)	
Year	No.	%	No.	%	No.	%
2025	1,561	61.14%	974	38.15%	18	0.71%
2021	1,481	67.14%	710	32.18%	15	0.68%
2017	867	52.96%	738	45.08%	32	1.95%
2013	1,315	69.14%	553	29.07%	34	1.79%
2009	1,131	54.66%	801	38.71%	137	6.62%
2005	800	47.68%	796	47.44%	82	4.89%

In the 2016 presidential election, Republican Donald Trump received 1,710 votes (58.0%), ahead of Democrat Hillary Clinton with 1,142 votes (38.7%) and other candidates with 97 votes (3.3%), among the 2,949 ballots cast. In the 2012 presidential election, Republican Mitt Romney received 1,439 votes (49.1% vs. 41.1% countywide), ahead of Democrat Barack Obama with 1,430 votes (48.8% vs. 57.9%) and other candidates with 41 votes (1.4% vs. 0.9%), among the 2,933 ballots cast by the township's 4,249 registered voters, for a turnout of 69.0% (vs. 65.8% in Atlantic County). In the 2008 presidential election, Republican John McCain received 1,512 votes (49.5% vs. 41.6% countywide), ahead of Democrat Barack Obama with 1,467 votes (48.0% vs. 56.5%) and other candidates with 43 votes (1.4% vs. 1.1%), among the 3,057 ballots cast by the township's 4,278 registered voters, for a turnout of 71.5% (vs. 68.1% in Atlantic County). In the 2004 presidential election, Republican George W. Bush received 1,487 votes (53.5% vs. 46.2% countywide), ahead of Democrat John Kerry with 1,244 votes (44.8% vs. 52.0%) and other candidates with 24 votes (0.9% vs. 0.8%), among the 2,778 ballots cast by the township's 3,811 registered voters, for a turnout of 72.9% (vs. 69.8% in the whole county).

Presidential elections results
Year	Republican	Democratic	Third Parties
2024	64.5% 2,082	33.9% 1,096	1.6% 45
2020	60.8% 2,085	38.1% 1,306	1.1% 41
2016	57.0% 1,710	38.7% 1,142	3.3% 97
2012	49.1% 1,439	48.8% 1,430	1.4% 41
2008	49.5% 1,512	48.0% 1,467	1.4% 43
2004	53.5% 1,487	44.8% 1,244	0.9% 24

In the 2013 gubernatorial election, Republican Chris Christie received 1,315 votes (67.8% vs. 60.0% countywide), ahead of Democrat Barbara Buono with 553 votes (28.5% vs. 34.9%) and other candidates with 34 votes (1.8% vs. 1.3%), among the 1,939 ballots cast by the township's 4,288 registered voters, yielding a 45.2% turnout (vs. 41.5% in the county). In the 2009 gubernatorial election, Republican Chris Christie received 1,131 votes (53.4% vs. 47.7% countywide), ahead of Democrat Jon Corzine with 801 votes (37.8% vs. 44.5%), Independent Chris Daggett with 102 votes (4.8% vs. 4.8%) and other candidates with 35 votes (1.7% vs. 1.2%), among the 2,117 ballots cast by the township's 4,111 registered voters, yielding a 51.5% turnout (vs. 44.9% in the county).

United States Senate election results for Mullica Township1
Year	Republican		Democratic		Third party(ies)	
Year	No.	%	No.	%	No.	%
2024	1,932	62.85%	1,110	36.11%	32	1.04%
2018	1,278	60.45%	763	36.09%	73	3.45%
2012	1,334	48.54%	1,366	49.71%	48	1.75%
2006	1,080	52.48%	911	44.27%	67	3.26%

United States Senate election results for Mullica Township2
Year	Republican		Democratic		Third party(ies)	
Year	No.	%	No.	%	No.	%
2020	2,014	60.35%	1,262	37.82%	61	1.83%
2014	957	55.22%	729	42.07%	47	2.71%
2013	609	60.00%	393	38.72%	13	1.28%
2008	1,384	50.46%	1,292	47.10%	67	2.44%

== Education ==
The Mullica Township Schools serve students in pre-kindergarten through eighth grade. As of the 2020–21 school year, the district, comprised of two schools, had an enrollment of 652 students and 56.7 classroom teachers (on an FTE basis), for a student–teacher ratio of 11.5:1. Schools in the district (with 2020–21 enrollment data from the National Center for Education Statistics.) are Mullica Township Elementary School with 331 students in grades Pre-K–4 and Mullica Township Middle School with 320 students in grades 5–8. With the start of the 2016–17 school year, the Washington Township School District no longer operates and all students from Washington Township attend the Mullica Township Schools as part of a full sending/receiving relationship.

Students in ninth through twelfth grades attend Cedar Creek High School, which is located in the northern section of Egg Harbor City and opened to students in September 2010. The school is one of three high schools operated as part of the Greater Egg Harbor Regional High School District, which is comprised of the constituent municipalities of Egg Harbor City, Galloway Township and Hamilton Township, and participates in sending/receiving relationships with Port Republic and Washington Township (Burlington County). Cedar Creek High School is zoned to serve students from Egg Harbor City, Mullica Township, Port Republic and Washington Township, while students in portions of Galloway and Hamilton townships have the opportunity to attend Cedar Creek through the school of choice program or through attendance in magnet programs offered at Cedar Creek. As of the 2020–21 school year, the high school had an enrollment of 935 students and 74.8 classroom teachers (on an FTE basis), for a student–teacher ratio of 12.5:1.

Township public school students are also eligible to attend the Atlantic County Institute of Technology in the Mays Landing section of Hamilton Township or the Charter-Tech High School for the Performing Arts, located in Somers Point.

== Transportation ==
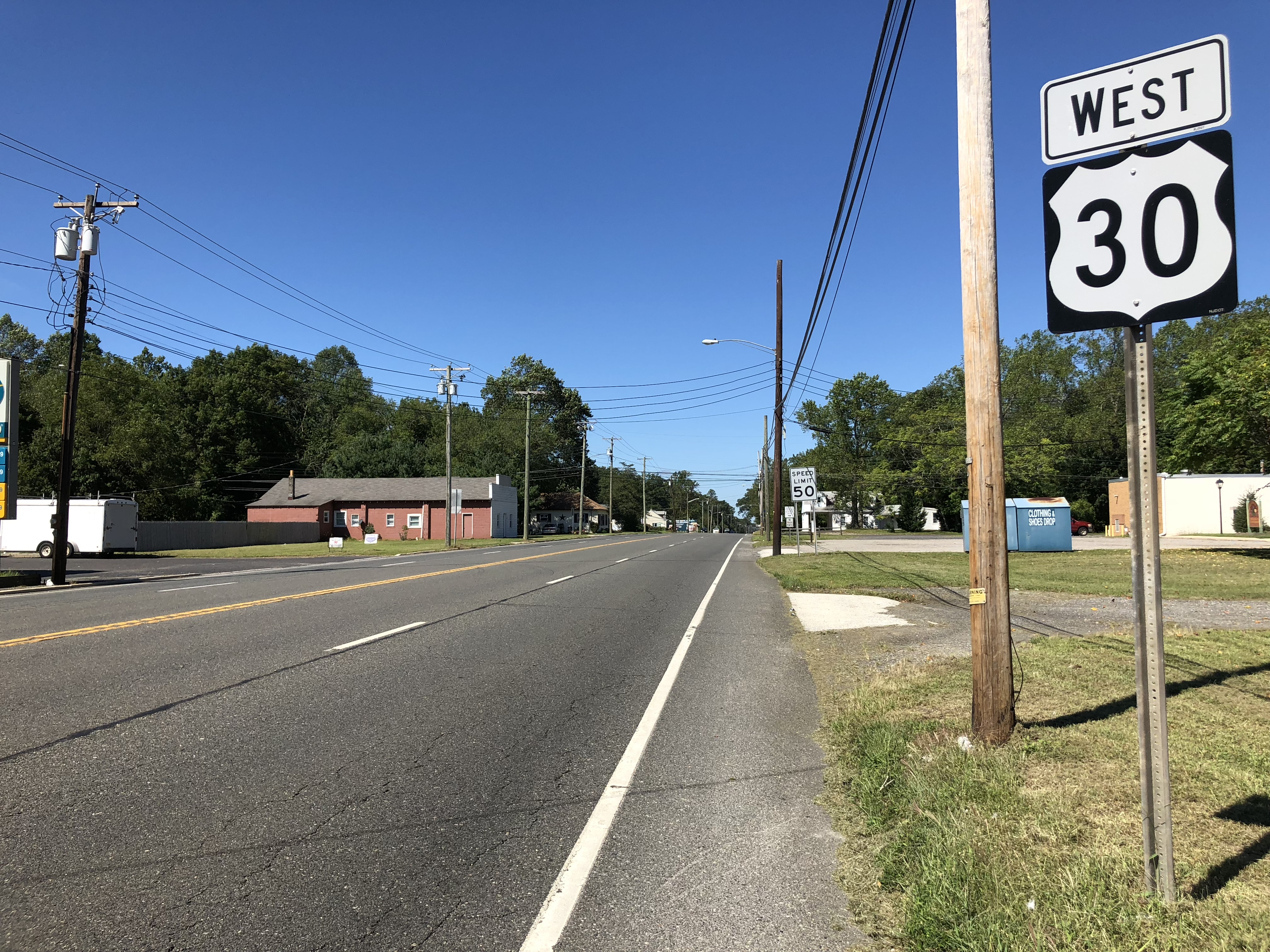
U.S. Route 30 (White Horse Pike) westbound in Mullica Township

=== Roads and highways ===
As of May 2010, the township had a total of 106.24 miles (170.98 km) of roadways, of which 59.91 miles (96.42 km) were maintained by the municipality, 38.26 miles (61.57 km) by Atlantic County and 8.07 miles (12.99 km) by the New Jersey Department of Transportation.

U.S. Route 30 (White Horse Pike) passes through Mullica Township. Many of the street names in Mullica Township are used on multiple, sometimes intersecting roads within the township, or reused from adjacent municipalities. Examples are Elwood Rd, Weekstown Road, Pleasant Mills Road, and Columbia Road. In fact, 7th Ave has two major intersections, one with County Road 612 and the other with County Road 643. Both of the county roads are named Weekstown Road at the point where they intersect with 7th Ave, approximately 2.5 miles away from each other.

=== Public transportation ===
NJ Transit provides bus service in the township on the 554 route that runs between Lindenwold station and Atlantic City.

== Notable people ==
People who were born in, residents of, or otherwise closely associated with Mullica Township include:

- Joseph Fralinger (1848–1927), businessman and confectioner, known for being the most successful merchandiser of salt water taffy
- Day Deborah Lipford, crowned Miss Delaware 1976, she became the first black woman to place as a semi finalist in the Miss America Pageant
- Eric Pålsson Mullica (1636–c. 1704), an early Swedish settler (with Finnish ancestry) for whom Mullica Township was named
- Charles Saalmann (1836–1909), captain of Union infantry during the American Civil War who established the Black Rose Vineyard

== See also ==
- List of New Jersey rivers
- Mullica Hill, New Jersey, a census-designated place located within Harrison Township, New Jersey, in Gloucester County
- Mullica River, a river in southern New Jersey once known as the Little Egg Harbor River
