= Washington Township, Burlington County, New Jersey =

Township in Burlington County, New Jersey, US

Washington Township, New Jersey
- Township
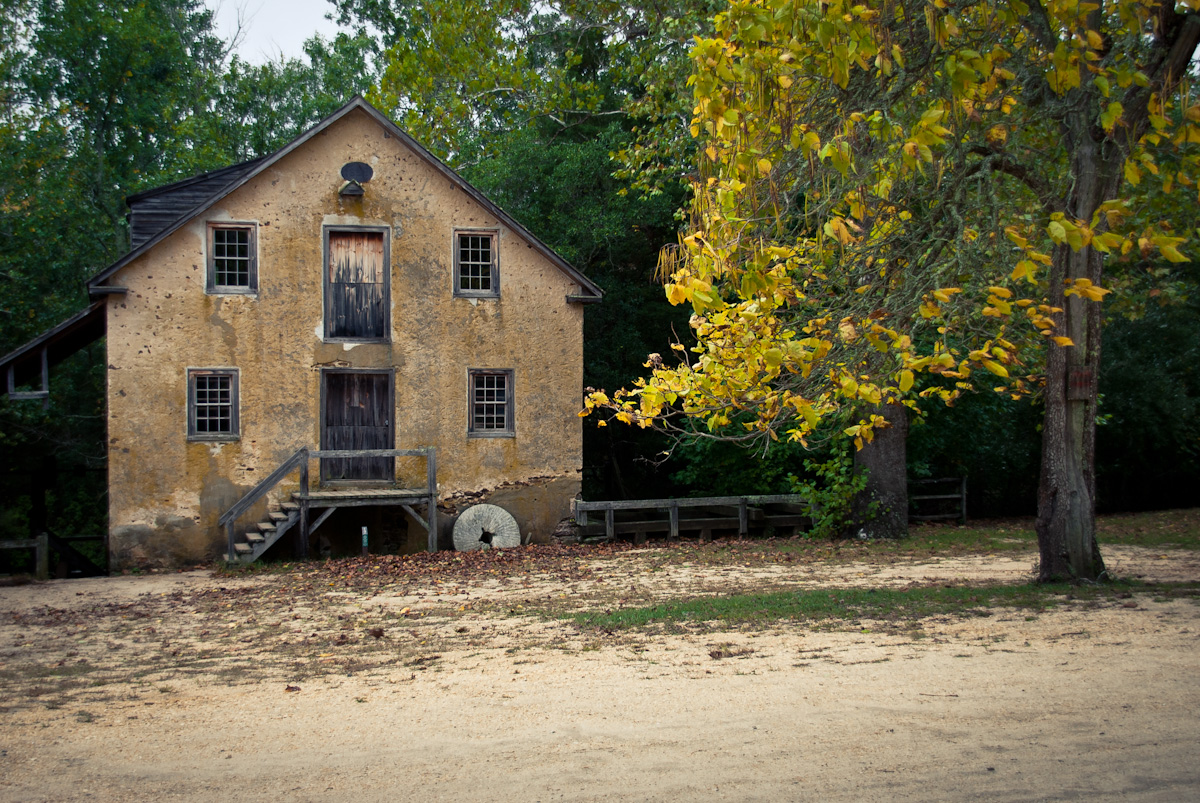
- Mill at Batsto Village

- Seal

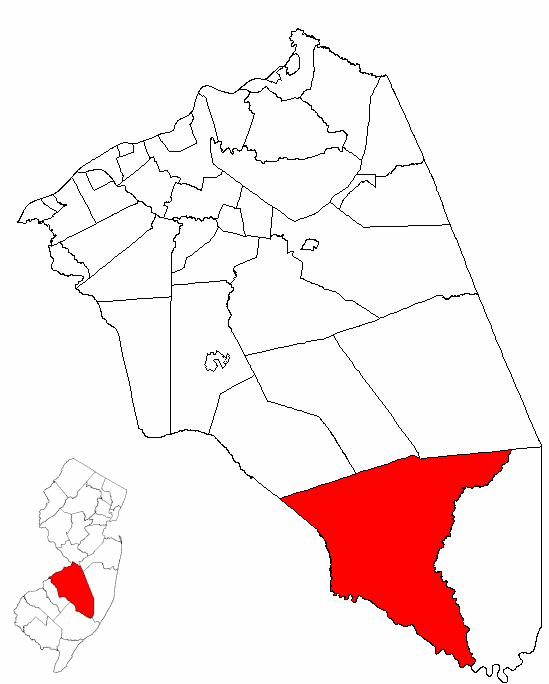
- Washington Township highlighted in Burlington County. Inset map: Burlington County highlighted in the State of New Jersey.

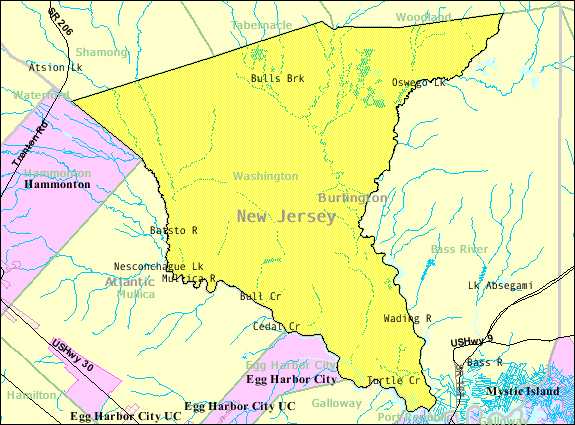
- Census Bureau map of Washington Township, Burlington County, New Jersey

- Location in Burlington County Location in New Jersey Location in the United States
- Coordinates: 39.684163°N 74.572639°W
- Country: United States
- State: New Jersey
- County: Burlington
- Incorporated: November 19, 1802
- Named for: George Washington

Government
  - Type: Township
  - Body: Township Committee
  - Mayor: Daniel L. James (R, term ends December 31, 2023)
  - Municipal clerk: Lisa H. Hand

Area
  - Total: 104.81 sq mi (271.46 km^{2})
  - Land: 101.66 sq mi (263.30 km^{2})
  - Water: 3.15 sq mi (8.16 km^{2}) 3.01%
  - Rank: 3rd of 565 in state 1st of 40 in county
- Elevation: 56 ft (17 m)

Population (2020)
  - Total: 693
  - Estimate (2023): 703
  - Rank: 547th of 565 in state 39th of 40 in county
  - Density: 6.8/sq mi (2.6/km^{2})
  - Rank: 564th of 565 in state 40th of 40 in county
- Time zone: UTC−05:00 (Eastern (EST))
  - Summer (DST): UTC−04:00 (Eastern (EDT))
- ZIP Code: 08215 – Egg Harbor City
- Area code: 609
- FIPS code: 3400577150
- GNIS feature ID: 0882085
- Website: www.wtbcnj.org

Washington Township is a township in Burlington County, in the U.S. state of New Jersey. As of the 2020 United States census, the township's population was 693, an increase of 6 (+0.9%) from the 2010 census count of 687, which in turn reflected an increase of 66 (+10.6%) from the 621 counted in the 2000 census. The township, and all of Burlington County, is a part of the Philadelphia metropolitan area.

Washington was incorporated as a township by an act of the New Jersey Legislature on November 19, 1802, from portions of Evesham Township, Little Egg Harbor Township and Northampton Township (now known as Mount Holly Township, New Jersey). Portions of the township were taken to form Shamong Township (February 19, 1852), Bass River Township (March 30, 1864), Woodland Township (March 7, 1866) and Randolph Township (March 17, 1870, reannexed to Washington Township on March 28, 1893). The township was named for George Washington, one of more than ten communities statewide named for the first president. It is one of five municipalities in the state of New Jersey with the name "Washington Township". Another municipality, Washington Borough, is completely surrounded by Washington Township, Warren County.

== Geography ==
According to the U.S. Census Bureau, the township had a total area of 104.81 square miles (271.46 km^{2}), including 101.66 square miles (263.30 km^{2}) of land and 3.15 square miles (8.16 km^{2}) of water (3.01%).

The township borders Bass River Township, Shamong Township, Tabernacle Township and Woodland Township in Burlington County; and Egg Harbor City, Galloway Township, Hammonton, Mullica Township and Port Republic in Atlantic County. The Mullica River forms most of the township's southwestern border with Atlantic County, while the Wading and Oswego Rivers form most of its eastern boundary with Bass River Township.

Unincorporated communities, localities and place names located partially or completely within the township include Batsto, Bear Swamp Hill, Bridgeport, Bulltown, Crowleytown, Friendship Bogs, Green Bank, Hermon, Hog Islands, Jemima Mount, Jenkins, Jenkins Neck, Lower Bank, Mount, Penn Place, Pleasant Mills, Quaker Bridge, Tylertown and Washington.

The township is one of 56 South Jersey municipalities that are included within the New Jersey Pinelands National Reserve, a protected natural area of unique ecology covering 1,100,000 acres (450,000 ha), that has been classified as a United States Biosphere Reserve and established by Congress in 1978 as the nation's first National Reserve. All of the township is included in the state-designated Pinelands Area, which includes portions of Burlington County, along with areas in Atlantic, Camden, Cape May, Cumberland, Gloucester and Ocean counties.

== Demographics ==
Historical population
| Census | Pop. | Note | %± |
|---|---|---|---|
| 1810 | 1,273 | | — |
| 1820 | 1,225 | | −3.8% |
| 1830 | 1,315 | | 7.3% |
| 1840 | 1,630 | | 24.0% |
| 1850 | 2,010 | | 23.3% |
| 1860 | 1,723 | * | −14.3% |
| 1870 | 609 | * | −64.7% |
| 1880 | 389 | * | −36.1% |
| 1890 | 310 | | −20.3% |
| 1900 | 617 | | 99.0% |
| 1910 | 597 | | −3.2% |
| 1920 | 500 | | −16.2% |
| 1930 | 478 | | −4.4% |
| 1940 | 518 | | 8.4% |
| 1950 | 566 | | 9.3% |
| 1960 | 541 | | −4.4% |
| 1970 | 673 | | 24.4% |
| 1980 | 808 | | 20.1% |
| 1990 | 805 | | −0.4% |
| 2000 | 621 | | −22.9% |
| 2010 | 687 | | 10.6% |
| 2020 | 693 | | 0.9% |
| 2023 (est.) | 703 | | 1.4% |
Population sources:1810–2000 1810–1920 1840 1850–1870; 1850 1870 1880–1890; 1890–1910 1910–1930; 1940–2000 2000; 2010 2020 * = Lost territory in previous decade.

=== 2010 census ===
The 2010 United States census counted 687 people, 256 households, and 178 families in the township. The population density was 6.9 per square mile (2.7/km^{2}). There were 284 housing units at an average density of 2.9 per square mile (1.1/km^{2}). The racial makeup was 93.89% (645) White, 1.89% (13) Black or African American, 0.00% (0) Native American, 0.15% (1) Asian, 0.00% (0) Pacific Islander, 3.64% (25) from other races, and 0.44% (3) from two or more races. Hispanic or Latino of any race were 9.02% (62) of the population.

Of the 256 households, 25.4% had children under the age of 18; 55.5% were married couples living together; 7.4% had a female householder with no husband present and 30.5% were non-families. Of all households, 25.4% were made up of individuals and 10.2% had someone living alone who was 65 years of age or older. The average household size was 2.63 and the average family size was 3.16.

18.3% of the population were under the age of 18, 11.5% from 18 to 24, 21.7% from 25 to 44, 33.5% from 45 to 64, and 15.0% who were 65 years of age or older. The median age was 43.9 years. For every 100 females, the population had 106.3 males. For every 100 females ages 18 and older there were 102.5 males.

The Census Bureau's 2006–2010 American Community Survey showed that (in 2010 inflation-adjusted dollars) median household income was $96,250 (with a margin of error of +/− $21,869) and the median family income was $108,239 (+/− $9,762). Males had a median income of $19,946 (+/− $15,879) versus $41,250 (+/− $4,961) for females. The per capita income for the borough was $24,808 (+/− $10,822). About none of families and 21.1% of the population were below the poverty line, including none of those under age 18 and none of those age 65 or over.

=== 2000 census ===
As of the 2000 United States census there were 621 people, 160 households, and 112 families residing in the township. The population density was 6.2 inhabitants per square mile (2.4/km^{2}). There were 171 housing units at an average density of 1.7 per square mile (0.66/km^{2}). The racial makeup of the township was 83.57% White, 2.90% African American, 0.32% Asian, 12.08% from other races, and 1.13% from two or more races. Hispanic or Latino of any race were 17.07% of the population.

There were 160 households, out of which 35.6% had children under the age of 18 living with them, 61.3% were married couples living together, 6.3% had a female householder with no husband present, and 29.4% were non-families. 24.4% of all households were made up of individuals, and 12.5% had someone living alone who was 65 years of age or older. The average household size was 2.76 and the average family size was 3.27.

In the township the population was spread out, with 29.3% under the age of 18, 3.5% from 18 to 24, 23.8% from 25 to 44, 19.0% from 45 to 64, and 24.3% who were 65 years of age or older. The median age was 41 years. For every 100 females, there were 92.3 males. For every 100 females age 18 and over, there were 86.8 males.

The median income for a household in the township was $41,250, and the median income for a family was $42,188. Males had a median income of $32,000 versus $31,719 for females. The per capita income for the township was $13,977. About 8.0% of families and 16.0% of the population were below the poverty line, including 22.4% of those under age 18 and 13.9% of those age 65 or over.

== Government ==
=== Local government ===
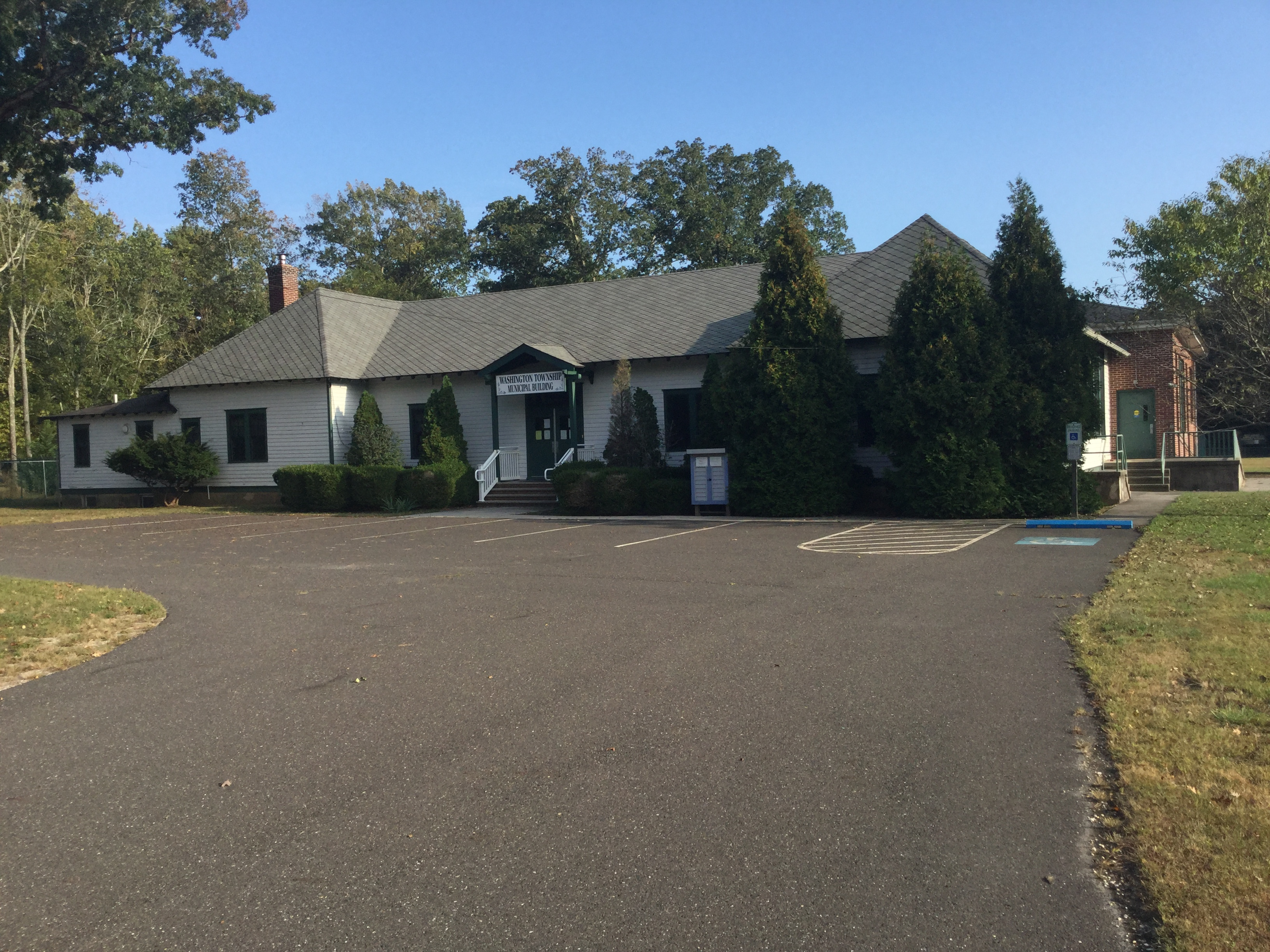
Washington Township Municipal Building

Washington Township is governed under the Township form of New Jersey municipal government, one of 141 municipalities (of the 564) statewide that use this form, the second-most commonly used form of government in the state. The governing body is comprised of a three-member Township Committee, whose members are elected directly by the voters at-large in partisan elections to serve three-year terms of office on a staggered basis, with one seat coming up for election each year as part of the November general election in a three-year cycle. At an annual reorganization meeting, the Township Committee selects one of its members to serve as Mayor.

As of 2023, the members of the Washington Township Council are Mayor Daniel L. James (R, term on council ends December 31, 2025; term as mayor ends 2023), Deputy Mayor Paul Seybold (R, term on committee and as deputy mayor ends 2023) and C. Leigh Gadd Jr. (R, 2024).

In July 2018, Paul Seybold was selected to fill the seat expiring in December 2020 that had been held by Daniel James.

Washington Township shares a municipal court with neighboring Bass River Township; the court is located in New Gretna, Bass River Township.

In 2018, the township had an average property tax bill of $3,438, the lowest in the county, compared to an average bill of $6,872 in Burlington County and $8,767 statewide.

=== Federal, state, and county representation ===
Washington Township is located in the 3rd Congressional District and is part of New Jersey's 8th state legislative district.

For the 119th United States Congress, New Jersey's 3rd congressional district is currently represented Herb Conaway (D, Delran Township). New Jersey is represented in the United States Senate by Democrats Cory Booker (Newark, term ends 2027) and Andy Kim (Moorestown, term ends 2031).

For the 2026–2027 session, the 8th legislative district of the New Jersey Legislature is represented in the New Jersey Senate by Latham Tiver (R, Southampton Township) and in the General Assembly by Anthony Angelozzi (D, Hammonton) and Andrea Katz (D, Chesterfield Township).

Burlington County is governed by a Board of County Commissioners comprised of five members who are chosen at-large in partisan elections to serve three-year terms of office on a staggered basis, with either one or two seats coming up for election each year; at an annual reorganization meeting, the board selects a director and deputy director from among its members to serve a one-year term. As of 2026, Burlington County's Commissioners are: Director Felicia Hopson (D, Willingboro Township, term as commissioner ends December 31, 2027; term as director ends 2026), Deputy Director Allison Eckel (D, Medford, term as commissioner ends 2028; term as deputy director ends 2026), Randy Brolo (D, Lumberton, 2026; elected to an unexpired term), Tyler Burrell (D, Delran Township, 2027) and Tom Pullion (D, Edgewater Park, 2026).

Burlington County's constitutional officers are Clerk Joanne Schwartz (D, Southampton Township, 2028), Sheriff James H. Kostoplis (D, Bordentown, 2028) and Surrogate Brian J. Carlin (D, Burlington Township, 2026).

=== Politics ===
United States presidential election results for Washington Township 2024 2020 2016 2012 2008 2004
| Year | Republican | | Democratic | | Third party(ies) | |
| Year | No. | % | No. | % | No. | % |
|---|---|---|---|---|---|---|
| 2024 | 274 | 63.72% | 152 | 35.35% | 4 | 0.93% |
| 2020 | 242 | 57.62% | 171 | 40.71% | 7 | 1.67% |
| 2016 | 210 | 57.38% | 148 | 40.44% | 8 | 2.19% |
| 2012 | 221 | 59.73% | 142 | 38.38% | 7 | 1.89% |
| 2008 | 250 | 58.28% | 168 | 39.16% | 11 | 2.56% |
| 2004 | 272 | 62.39% | 160 | 36.70% | 4 | 0.92% |

As of March 2011, there were a total of 536 registered voters in Washington Township, of which 85 (15.9% vs. 33.3% countywide) were registered as Democrats, 271 (50.6% vs. 23.9%) were registered as Republicans and 180 (33.6% vs. 42.8%) were registered as Unaffiliated. There were no voters registered to other parties. Among the township's 2010 Census population, 78.0% (vs. 61.7% in Burlington County) were registered to vote, including 95.5% of those ages 18 and over (vs. 80.3% countywide).

In the 2012 presidential election, Republican Mitt Romney received 221 votes (59.2% vs. 40.2% countywide), ahead of Democrat Barack Obama with 142 votes (38.1% vs. 58.1%) and other candidates with 7 votes (1.9% vs. 1.0%), among the 373 ballots cast by the township's 533 registered voters, for a turnout of 70.0% (vs. 74.5% in Burlington County). In the 2008 presidential election, Republican John McCain received 250 votes (57.9% vs. 39.9% countywide), ahead of Democrat Barack Obama with 168 votes (38.9% vs. 58.4%) and other candidates with 11 votes (2.5% vs. 1.0%), among the 432 ballots cast by the township's 545 registered voters, for a turnout of 79.3% (vs. 80.0% in Burlington County). In the 2004 presidential election, Republican George W. Bush received 272 votes (62.1% vs. 46.0% countywide), ahead of Democrat John Kerry with 160 votes (36.5% vs. 52.9%) and other candidates with 4 votes (0.9% vs. 0.8%), among the 438 ballots cast by the township's 558 registered voters, for a turnout of 78.5% (vs. 78.8% in the whole county).

Gubernatorial election results for Washington Township
| Year | Republican | | Democratic | | Third party(ies) | |
| Year | No. | % | No. | % | No. | % |
|---|---|---|---|---|---|---|
| 2025 | 222 | 63.43% | 126 | 36.00% | 2 | 0.57% |
| 2021 | 190 | 67.38% | 89 | 31.56% | 3 | 1.06% |
| 2017 | 110 | 55.28% | 85 | 42.71% | 4 | 2.01% |
| 2013 | 156 | 68.72% | 61 | 26.87% | 10 | 4.41% |
| 2009 | 186 | 62.84% | 91 | 30.74% | 19 | 6.42% |
| 2005 | 144 | 56.47% | 98 | 38.43% | 13 | 5.10% |

In the 2013 gubernatorial election, Republican Chris Christie received 156 votes (66.4% vs. 61.4% countywide), ahead of Democrat Barbara Buono with 61 votes (26.0% vs. 35.8%) and other candidates with 10 votes (4.3% vs. 1.2%), among the 235 ballots cast by the township's 509 registered voters, yielding a 46.2% turnout (vs. 44.5% in the county). In the 2009 gubernatorial election, Republican Chris Christie received 186 votes (62.4% vs. 47.7% countywide), ahead of Democrat Jon Corzine with 91 votes (30.5% vs. 44.5%), Independent Chris Daggett with 17 votes (5.7% vs. 4.8%) and other candidates with 2 votes (0.7% vs. 1.2%), among the 298 ballots cast by the township's 552 registered voters, yielding a 54.0% turnout (vs. 44.9% in the county).

United States Senate election results for Washington Township1
| Year | Republican | | Democratic | | Third party(ies) | |
| Year | No. | % | No. | % | No. | % |
|---|---|---|---|---|---|---|
| 2024 | 271 | 64.68% | 143 | 34.13% | 5 | 1.19% |
| 2018 | 189 | 57.62% | 117 | 35.67% | 22 | 6.71% |
| 2012 | 195 | 57.35% | 136 | 40.00% | 9 | 2.65% |
| 2006 | 180 | 62.07% | 100 | 34.48% | 10 | 3.45% |

United States Senate election results for Washington Township2
| Year | Republican | | Democratic | | Third party(ies) | |
| Year | No. | % | No. | % | No. | % |
|---|---|---|---|---|---|---|
| 2020 | 239 | 58.01% | 167 | 40.53% | 6 | 1.46% |
| 2014 | 123 | 60.89% | 75 | 37.13% | 4 | 1.98% |
| 2013 | 84 | 65.63% | 42 | 32.81% | 2 | 1.56% |
| 2008 | 214 | 58.15% | 144 | 39.13% | 10 | 2.72% |

== Education ==
With the start of the 2016–17 school year, the Washington Township School District no longer operates and all students from Washington Township attend the Mullica Township Schools as part of a full sending/receiving relationship. As of the 2018–19 school year, the district, comprised of two schools, had an enrollment of 702 students and 54.4 classroom teachers (on an FTE basis), for a student–teacher ratio of 12.9:1. Schools in the district (with 2018–19 enrollment data from the National Center for Education Statistics.) are Mullica Township Elementary School with 382 students in grades Pre-K–4 and Mullica Township Middle School with 315 students in grades 5–8.

Students in ninth through twelfth grades attend Cedar Creek High School, which is located in the northern section of Egg Harbor City and opened to students in September 2010. The school is one of three high schools operated as part of the Greater Egg Harbor Regional High School District, which is comprised of the constituent municipalities of Egg Harbor City, Galloway Township and Hamilton Township, and participates in sending/receiving relationships with Mullica Township and Port Republic. Cedar Creek High School is zoned to serve students from Egg Harbor City, Mullica Township, Port Republic and Washington Township, while students in portions of Galloway and Hamilton townships have the opportunity to attend Cedar Creek through the school of choice program or through attendance in magnet programs offered at Cedar Creek. Prior to the opening of Cedar Creek, students from Washington Township had attended Oakcrest High School, together with students from Hamilton Township, Mullica Township and Port Republic. As of the 2018–19 school year, the high school had an enrollment of 930 students and 73.4 classroom teachers (on an FTE basis), for a student–teacher ratio of 12.7:1.

Students from Washington Township, and from all of Burlington County, are eligible to attend the Burlington County Institute of Technology, a countywide public school district that serves the vocational and technical education needs of students at the high school and post-secondary level at its campuses in Medford and Westampton.

== Transportation ==
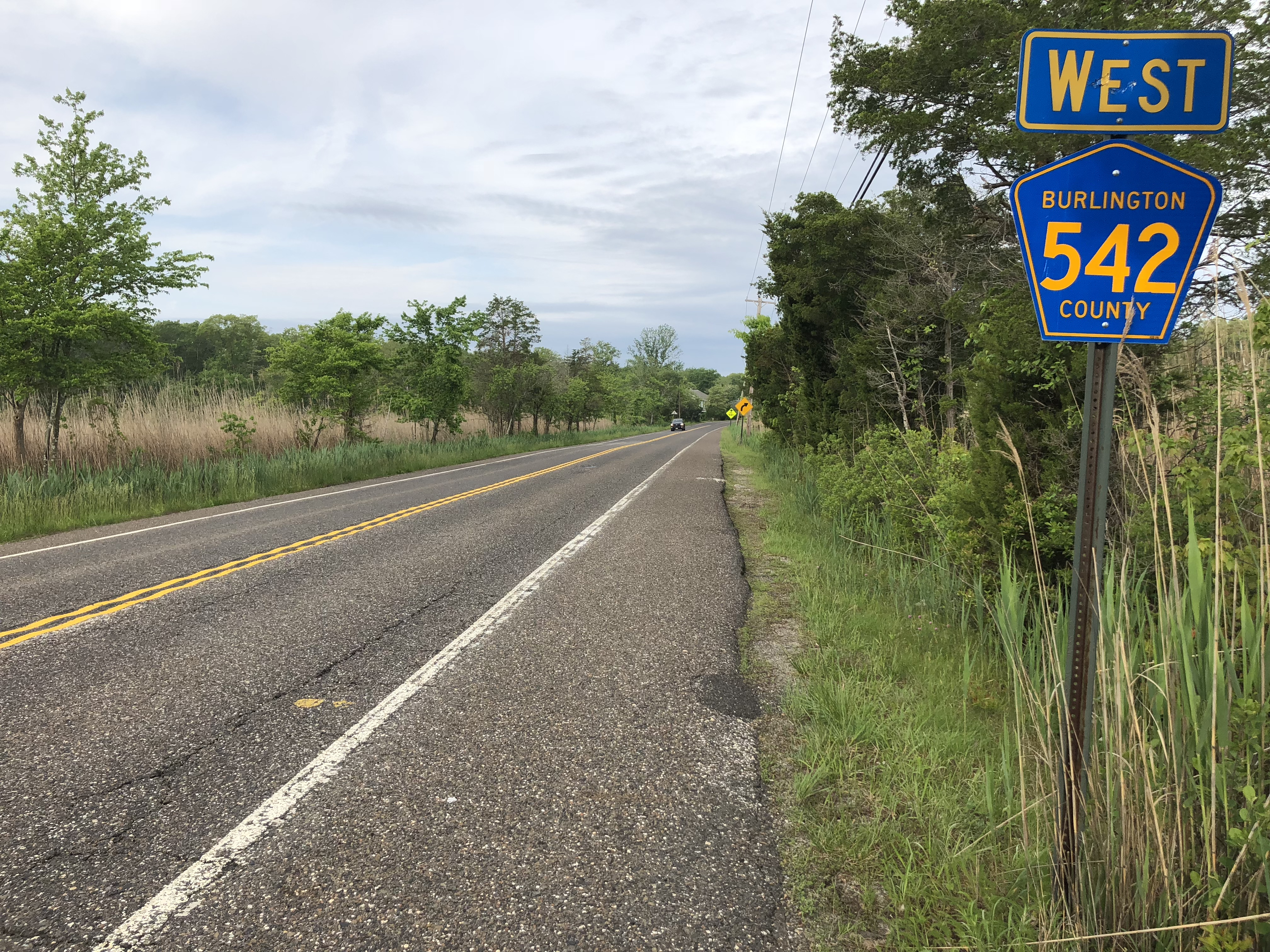
County Road 542 in Washington Township

As of May 2010, the township had a total of 54.31 miles (87.40 km) of roadways, of which 29.32 miles (47.19 km) were maintained by the municipality and 24.99 miles (40.22 km) by Burlington County.

The only major roads that pass through are County Road 542 and County Road 563.

Limited access roads are accessible in neighboring communities, including the Atlantic City Expressway in Hammonton and the Garden State Parkway in Galloway Township, Port Republic and Bass River Township.

== Notable people ==
People who were born in, residents of, or otherwise closely associated with Washington Township include:

- William Brookfield (1844–1903), businessman and politician from New York
- Kathleen Crowley (1929–2017), actress
- Eric Pålsson Mullica, early colonist
- James Still (1812–1882), physician, herbalist, and author.
