= Greater Egg Harbor Regional High School District =

School district in Atlantic County, New Jersey, US

Address
- 1824 Dennis Foreman Drive Mays Landing, Atlantic County, New Jersey, 08330; United States
- Coordinates: 39.451345°N 74.679689°W

District information
- Grades: 9-12
- Superintendent: James Reina
- Business administrator: Thomas P. Grossi
- Schools: 3

Students and staff
- Enrollment: 3,079 (as of 2023–24)
- Faculty: 264.9 FTEs
- Student–teacher ratio: 11.6:1

Other information
- District Factor Group: CD
- Website: www.gehrhsd.net
Ind.	Per pupil	District spending	Rank (*)	9-12 average	%± vs. average
1A	Total Spending	$20,143	20	$18,891	6.6%
1	Budgetary Cost	14,476	13	15,592	−7.2%
2	Classroom Instruction	7,926	12	8,807	−10.0%
6	Support Services	1,656	5	2,294	−27.8%
8	Administrative Cost	1,677	26	1,592	5.3%
10	Operations & Maintenance	2,462	45	1,954	26.0%
13	Extracurricular Activities	748	16	873	−14.3%
16	Median Teacher Salary	60,460	7	71,726
Data from NJDoE 2014 Taxpayers' Guide to Education Spending. *Of 9-12 districts with any number of students. Lowest spending=1; Highest=47

The Greater Egg Harbor Regional High School District is a regional public high school district in Atlantic County, in the U.S. state of New Jersey. The district serves students in ninth through twelfth grades from the constituent municipalities of Egg Harbor City, Galloway Township, Hamilton Township and Mullica Township, together with the districts of the City of Port Republic and Washington Township (in Burlington County) who attend as part of sending/receiving relationships.

As of the 2023–24 school year, the district, comprised of three schools, had an enrollment of 3,079 students and 264.9 classroom teachers (on an FTE basis), for a student–teacher ratio of 11.6:1.

== History ==
The district was established with the passage of a referendum in January 1957 by the five constituent municipalities of Egg Harbor City, Egg Harbor Township, Galloway Township, Hamilton Township and Mullica Township by a 5-1 margin that allocated $1.7 million (equivalent to $19 million in 2024) for the construction of what would become Oakcrest High School. Egg Harbor Regional High School opened in September 1960, with 150 students from Hamilton Township shifted out of Vineland High School. The school was renamed as Oakcrest High School for the start of the 1960-61 school year. The school name was chosen based on its site on the crest of a hill amid oak trees.

Absegami High School was established at the start of the 1972–73 school year as a school-within-a-school inside Oakcrest High School. Absegami had its own independent identity and held classes in the afternoons, while Oakcrest met during morning sessions. By a three-vote margin, voters in the district approved a referendum by 1,152-1,149 to spend $11.89 million (equivalent to $51.5 million in 2024) for the construction of Absegami's own building on a 120-acre (49 ha) site in Galloway Township. Absegami High School opened independently in its own building in September 1982.

Voters passed a September 2007 referendum by a 3,176–1,719 margin, approving a plan to construct a third high school in the district, to be located in Egg Harbor City and constricted at a cost of $81.7 million. The new Cedar Creek High School was planned to alleviate overcrowding in the two existing schools and serve students from Egg Harbor City and Mullica Township. Construction began in Fall 2008 and opened to students in September 2010.

In 2009–10, the district had 3,296 students, its peak enrollment. Enrollment decreased afterward due to a decline in casino jobs. Between 2009-2010 and 2014 its enrollment declined by almost 6%.

The district had been classified by the New Jersey Department of Education as being in District Factor Group "CD", the sixth-highest of eight groupings. District Factor Groups organize districts statewide to allow comparison by common socioeconomic characteristics of the local districts. From lowest socioeconomic status to highest, the categories are A, B, CD, DE, FG, GH, I and J.

== Awards and recognition ==
For the 2005–06 school year, the district was recognized with the "Best Practices Award" by the New Jersey Department of Education for its "A Proactive Approach to Guidance and Career Services" Career Education program at Oakcrest High School.

== Schools ==
Schools in the district (with 2023–24 enrollment data from the National Center for Education Statistics) are:

- Absegami High School (1,131 students), located in Galloway Township, serves students from Galloway Township.
  - Daniel Kern, principal
- Cedar Creek High School (942 students) located in Egg Harbor City, serves students from Egg Harbor City, Mullica Township, Port Republic and Washington Township (in Burlington County).
  - Scott Parker, principal
- Oakcrest High School (936 students) located in Hamilton Township, serves students from Hamilton Township.
  - Mike Manning, principal

== Administration ==
Core members of the districts' administration are:

- James Reina, superintendent
- Thomas P. Grossi, business administrator and board secretary

== Board of education ==
The district's board of education, comprised of nine members, sets policy and oversees the fiscal and educational operation of the district through its administration. As a Type II school district, the board's trustees are elected directly by voters to serve three-year terms of office on a staggered basis, with three seats up for election each year held (since 2012) as part of the November general election. The board appoints a superintendent to oversee the district's day-to-day operations and a business administrator to supervise the business functions of the district. Seats on the nine-member board are allocated based on the population of the constituent municipalities, with four seats assigned to Galloway Township, three to Hamilton Township and one each to Egg Harbor City and Mullica Township.
