= Cedar Creek High School (New Jersey) =

High school in Atlantic County, New Jersey, US

Location
- 1701 New York Avenue; Egg Harbor City, Atlantic County, New Jersey 08215; United States
- 39.5518°N 74.6278°W

Information
- Type: Public
- Established: September 2010
- School district: Greater Egg Harbor Regional High School District
- NCES School ID: 340606003115
- Principal: Scott Parker
- Faculty: 81.5 FTEs
- Grades: 9th-12th
- Enrollment: 928 (as of 2024–25)
- Student to teacher ratio: 11.4:1
- Colors: Forest Green and Maroon
- Athletics conference: Cape-Atlantic League (general); West Jersey Football League (football)
- Team name: Pirates
- GEHRHSD: Absegami High School; Cedar Creek High School; Oakcrest High School
- Website: www.gehrhsd.net/o/cchs

Cedar Creek High School is a public high school in Egg Harbor City, Atlantic County, in the U.S. state of New Jersey. The school serves students in ninth through twelfth grades as part of the Greater Egg Harbor Regional High School District and opened in September 2010. The school's colors are forest green, maroon and cream. The school mascot is the pirate.

As of the 2024–25 school year, the school had an enrollment of 928 students and 81.5 classroom teachers (on an FTE basis), for a student–teacher ratio of 11.4:1. There were 319 students (34.4% of enrollment) eligible for free lunch and 90 (9.7% of students) eligible for reduced-cost lunch.

Cedar Creek High School is located in the northern section of Egg Harbor City, and educates students from Egg Harbor City, Mullica Township, Port Republic and Washington Township (in Burlington County). Students from Galloway Township and Hamilton Township are zoned to other schools but are eligible to attend Cedar Creek through the district's school of choice program.

== History ==
In a referendum held on September 25, 2007, by a 65-35% margin, voters approved a plan to construct a third high school in the district, to be located in Egg Harbor City and constructed at a cost of $81.7 million (equivalent to $126.9 million in 2025); the new facility was intended to alleviate overcrowding at Absegami High School and Oakcrest High School. The facility was designed to accommodate an enrollment of 1,000 students and had two-thirds of the total cost covered by the New Jersey Schools Development Authority; Construction began in Fall 2008 and the school opened to students in September 2010 with 415 freshmen and sophomores.

For the 2010–2011 school year, students in grades 9 and 10 attended Cedar Creek and students in grades 11-12 attended either Absegami High School in Galloway Township or Oakcrest High School in Hamilton Township. For school years 2011–12, students in grades 9-11 attended Cedar Creek High, while 12th grade students attended either Absegami High or Oakcrest High. In 2012–2013, Cedar Creek housed grades 9-12 and graduated it first senior class.

== Athletics ==
The Cedar Creek High School Pirates compete in the Cape-Atlantic League, which is comprised of public and private high schools in Atlantic, Cape May, Cumberland and Gloucester counties, and operates under the jurisdiction of the New Jersey State Interscholastic Athletic Association. With 703 students in grades 10-12, the school was classified by the NJSIAA for the 2022–24 school years as Group II South for most athletic competition purposes. The football team competes in the Independence Division of the 94-team West Jersey Football League superconference and was classified by the NJSIAA as Group III South for football for 2024–2026, which included schools with 695 to 882 students.

The girls' basketball team won the Group I state championship in 2012 with a 50–38 win over Whippany Park High School, earning the first state championship in any sport for Cedar Creek.

The football team won the South Jersey Group II state sectional championship in 2015, the Central Jersey Group II title in 2019 and the South Jersey Group III sectional title in 2021. In December 2015, the football team won the program's first state sectional title when they won the South Jersey Group II state sectional championship with a 28–27 win against West Deptford High School, defeating the team that beat them 42–28 in 2012 when they faced each other at Cedar Creek's first championship game. The team won the 2019 Central Jersey Group II sectional title in 2019 with a 31–23 win against Camden High School. The team won the South/Central Group III regional championship in 2021 against Woodrow Wilson High School (since renamed as Eastside High School) by a score of 35–34 to finish the season with a record of 13–0, to cap off the program's first undefeated season.

== Administration ==
The school's principal is Scott Parker. His administration team includes two assistant principals and the athletic director.

== Notable alumni ==
- Bo Melton (born 1999), American football wide receiver for the Green Bay Packers.
- Max Melton (born 2002), American football cornerback for the Arizona Cardinals
