= Waterford Schools =

Waterford Schools may refer to:

- Waterford School District in Michigan
- Waterford Township School District in New Jersey
