= Elizabeth Eckhardt May =

American home economist (1899–1996)

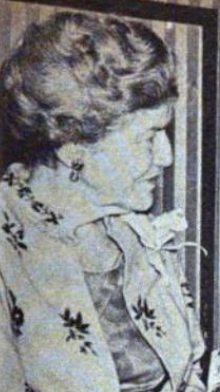
- Elizabeth Eckhardt May, from a 1966 publication
- Born: Elizabeth Marie Eckhardt; February 18, 1899; Folsom, New Jersey, U.S.
- Died: October 24, 1996 (aged 97); Braddock Heights, Maryland, U.S.
- Education: Columbia University; Trenton State Normal School
- Occupations: Home economist, college dean
- Employer(s): Hood College; University of Connecticut

Elizabeth Eckhardt May (February 18, 1899 – October 24, 1996) was an American home economist, educator, and college administrator. She was dean of the School of Home Economics at the University of Connecticut from 1952 to 1964, and before that academic dean of Hood College in Maryland. Her research and writing involved rehabilitation and work supports for disabled women.

== Early life and education ==
Elizabeth Marie Eckhardt was born in Folsom, New Jersey, one of the eleven children of Jacob Eckhardt and Rosa Measley Eckhardt. She attended Folsom School and graduated from Hammonton High School. She trained as a teacher at the Trenton State Normal School, as did three of her sisters. She earned a bachelor's, master's, and doctoral degree in education (Ed.D.) from Columbia University.

One of her sisters was Gertrude Eckhardt, an American public health nurse who worked in Germany with the US military government after World War II. Their brother Jack L. Eckhardt was the longtime mayor of Folsom.

== Career ==
May was a demonstration agent and state specialist with the West Virginia University Agricultural Extension Service. She was executive secretary of the Oglebay Institute, and of the White House Conference on Children in Democracy. She taught at the University of Minnesota and the University of Michigan.

In 1943, May became the academic dean at Hood College in Maryland. She became dean of the School of Home Economics at the University of Connecticut in 1952, and retired from Connecticut in 1964. She was a member of the President's Committee on the Employment of the Handicapped. Her research involved studies of physically disabled women's domestic work, including childcare, and rehabilitation approaches aimed at that group. "It is not a matter of gadgets," she said in a 1962 conference paper. "It is a matter of management."

== Publications ==
- "Whom to Train for Recreational Leadership" (1941)
- "College Women and National Service" (1952)
- "Rehabilitation Views and Previews" (1956)
- "Expanding the Services of the Home Economist in Rehabilitation" (1960)
- "Work Simplification in the Area of Child Care for Physically Handicapped Women" (1961)
- "Work Simplification in Child Care: Teaching Materials for the Rehabilitation of Physically Handicapped Homemakers" (1962)
- Homemaking for the Handicapped (1966, with Neva R. Waggoner and Eleanor Boettke Hotte, with photographs by Jerauld Manter)
- Independent Living for the Handicapped and Elderly (1974, with Neva R. Waggoner and Eleanor Boettke Hotte)

== Personal life ==
Elizabeth Eckhardt married architect and magazine editor Charles C. May, who died in 1937. She had a daughter, Margaret Gertrude, in 1939. Elizabeth died in 1996, at the age of 97, in Braddock Heights, Maryland. There is a large collection of her papers at the University of Connecticut Library.
