= Jerauld Manter =

American zoologist and amateur photographer

Jerauld Armington Manter
- Jerauld Manter in 1960
- Born: December 30, 1889; Londonderry, New Hampshire, US
- Died: August 21, 1990 (aged 100); Mansfield, Connecticut, US
- Education: University of New Hampshire
- Occupation(s): Ornithologist, photographer
- Employer: University of Connecticut

Jerauld Armington Manter (December 30, 1889 – August 21, 1990) was an American professor of ornithology and entomology at the University of Connecticut from 1912 to 1953. He was UConn's unofficial photographer, taking thousands of photos documenting university history and life.

== Life and career ==
Manter was born on December 30, 1889, in Londonderry, New Hampshire. His father was a farmer and operated a sawmill. The Manter family moved to Manchester when Manter was six years old. He graduated from Manchester High School and attended the New Hampshire College of Agriculture and Mechanic Arts (now the University of New Hampshire) from 1908 to 1912. Manter was offered a teaching and laboratory assistant position at the Connecticut Agricultural College by President Charles L. Beach, who hired him without an interview or even meeting him. He joined UConn in the fall of 1912. He taught zoology, with a focus on insects and birds, at the university until his retirement in 1953 after 41 years of service.

Manter was a lifelong photographer who spent five decades documenting all aspects of university life and history as well as the town and residents of Storrs. Manter owned the first movie camera in town, taught using his own films, and videoed football games and other events. "Manter has made a contribution to this institution that cannot be matched. His photographic history alone is worth every penny we ever paid him," President Albert N. Jorgensen told Provost Albert Waugh in 1947, according to Waugh's diary. Manter never accepted compensation for his photos. As of 2020, his huge photographic collection of 136,060 prints and negatives is held at the University of Connecticut Archives and Special Collections.

Manter also took countless photographs of animals and birds, some of which illustrated his book Birds of Storrs, Connecticut and Vicinity (1965 and 1975 editions). Almost four hundred of his photos of early New England church architecture are featured in the book Meetinghouse and Church in Early New England (1963) by Manter's friend Edmund Ware Sinnott. His photographs also illustrate the book Homemaking for the Handicapped (1966) by Elizabeth Eckhardt May.

== Personal life ==
Friend and fellow entomologist James A. Slater described Manter as "the epitome of the quiet, competent, unassuming New Englander." Manter was active in the community, leading Boy Scout troops and wartime scrap paper drives. He was nicknamed "Jed" by his closest friends. He was known for his knack, developed over many years, of predicting bird migration patterns—"his accuracy was legend on campus," reported the Hartford Courant.

Manter married Florence Goodwin Manter (1890–1964) a few years after he commenced employment at UConn. The couple had three children: Audrey M., Jerauld T., and Stanley P.

Following retirement, Manter remained an active photographer and continued to live on Gurleyville Road in Storrs. He died at Windham Hospital in Mansfield at the age of 100. He was interred in Storrs Cemetery, on a hill overlooking campus. Manter was survived by two of his children, Audrey and Jerauld. He was predeceased by his wife and a son, Stanley.

== Legacy ==
In 2019, UConn renamed the Horsebarn Hill Road Extension to Manter Road in his honor. A species of fungus gnat is named after him: the Apemon manteri, which entomologist Charles Willison Johnson discovered in 1930 in Mansfield while collecting specimens with Manter along the Willimantic River.
