= Folsom, New Jersey =

Borough in Atlantic County, New Jersey, US

- Borough
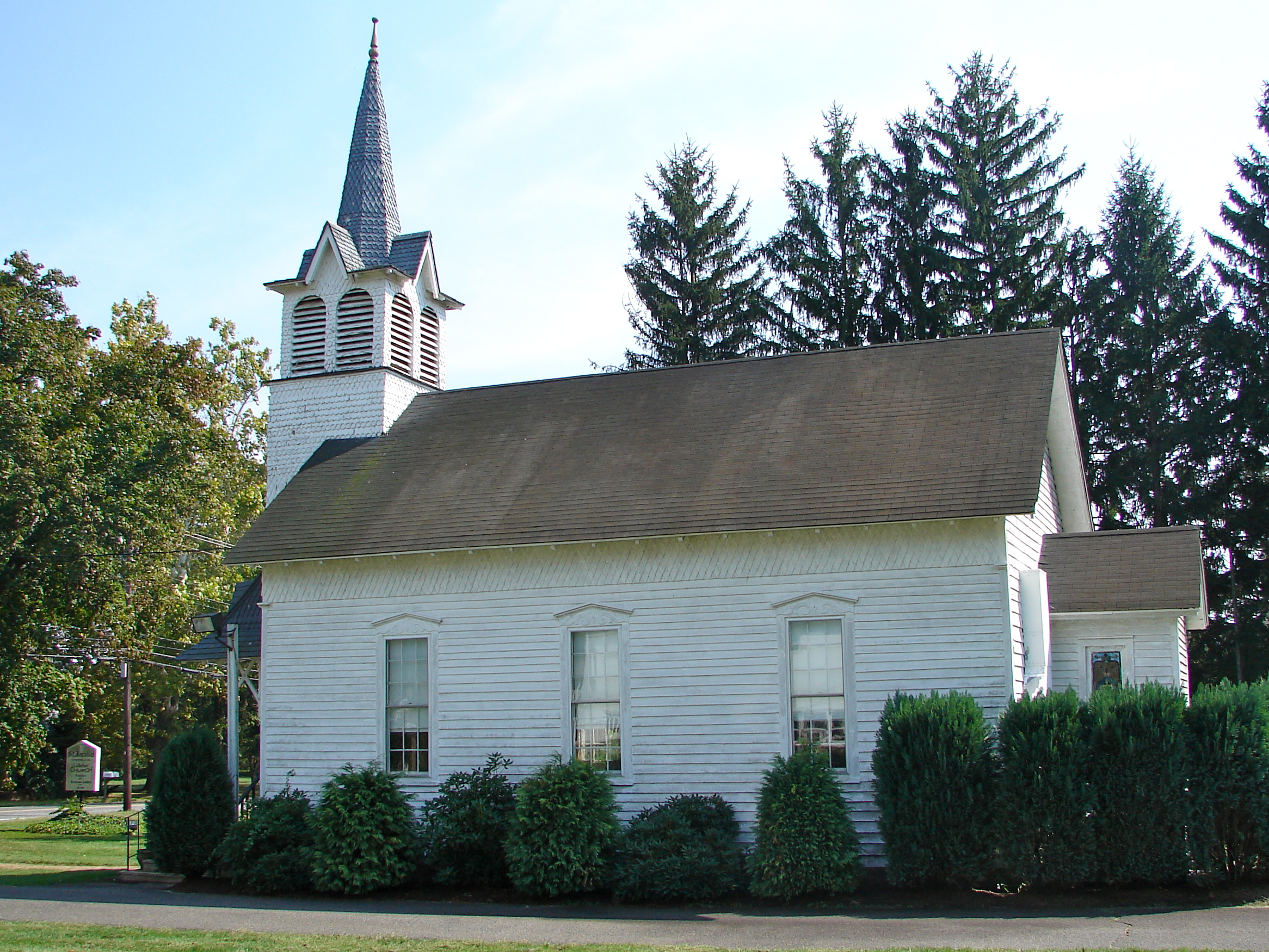
- Jacobus Evangelical Lutheran Church

- Seal

- Location of Folsom in Atlantic County highlighted in red (left). Inset map: Location of Atlantic County in New Jersey highlighted in orange (right).

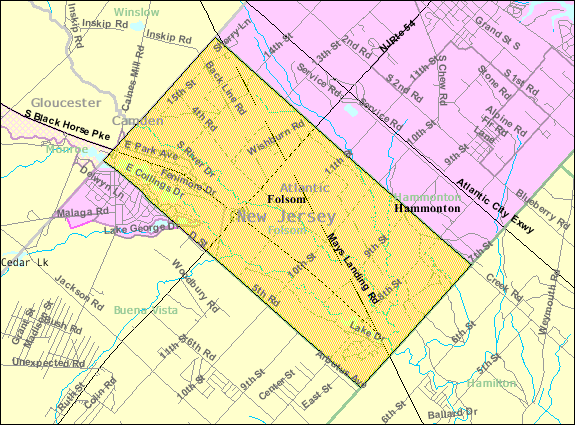
- Census Bureau map of Folsom, New Jersey

- Location in Atlantic County Location in New Jersey Location in the United States
- Coordinates: 39.596745°N 74.843163°W
- Country: United States
- State: New Jersey
- County: Atlantic
- Incorporated: May 23, 1906
- Named after: Frances Folsom

Government
  - Type: Borough
  - Body: Borough Council
  - Mayor: Greg Schenker (R, term ends December 31, 2023)
  - Municipal clerk: Patricia M. Gatto

Area
  - Total: 8.51 sq mi (22.04 km^{2})
  - Land: 8.26 sq mi (21.40 km^{2})
  - Water: 0.24 sq mi (0.63 km^{2}) 2.88%
  - Rank: 226th of 565 in state 14th of 23 in county
- Elevation: 56 ft (17 m)

Population (2020)
  - Total: 1,811
  - Estimate (2023): 1,813
  - Rank: 494th of 565 in state 19th of 23 in county
  - Density: 219.1/sq mi (84.6/km^{2})
  - Rank: 499th of 565 in state 18th of 23 in county
- Time zone: UTC−05:00 (Eastern (EST))
  - Summer (DST): UTC−04:00 (Eastern (EDT))
- ZIP Code: 08037
- Area code: 609 exchanges: 561, 567, 704
- FIPS code: 3400123940
- GNIS feature ID: 0885222
- Website: www.folsomborough.com

Folsom is a borough in Atlantic County, in the U.S. state of New Jersey. Geographically, the city, and all of Atlantic County, is part of the South Jersey region and of the Atlantic City-Hammonton metropolitan statistical area, which in turn is included in the Philadelphia metropolitan area.

As of the 2020 United States census, the borough's population was 1,811, a decrease of 74 (−3.9%) from the 2010 census count of 1,885, which in turn reflected a decline of 87 (−4.4%) from the 1,972 counted in the 2000 census.

Folsom was incorporated as a borough by an act of the New Jersey Legislature on May 23, 1906, from portions of Buena Vista Township. The borough was named for Frances Folsom, wife of President Grover Cleveland.

New Jersey Monthly magazine ranked Folsom as its 19th best place to live in its 2008 rankings of the "Best Places To Live" in New Jersey.

== Geography ==
According to the United States Census Bureau, the borough had a total area of 8.51 square miles (22.04 km^{2}), including 8.26 square miles (21.40 km^{2}) of land and 0.25 square miles (0.63 km^{2}) of water (2.88%).

Unincorporated communities, localities and place names located partially or completely within the borough include Penny Pot.

Folsom borders the municipalities of Buena Vista Township, Hamilton Township, and Hammonton in Atlantic County; Winslow Township in Camden County; and Monroe Township in Gloucester County.

The borough is one of 56 South Jersey municipalities that are included within the New Jersey Pinelands National Reserve, a protected natural area of unique ecology covering 1,100,000 acres (450,000 ha), that has been classified as a United States Biosphere Reserve and established by Congress in 1978 as the nation's first National Reserve. All of the borough is included in the state-designated Pinelands Area, which includes portions of Atlantic County, along with areas in Burlington, Camden, Cape May, Cumberland, Gloucester and Ocean counties.

== Demographics ==
Historical population
Census	Pop.	Note	%±
1910	232		—
1920	217		−6.5%
1930	219		0.9%
1940	229		4.6%
1950	292		27.5%
1960	482		65.1%
1970	1,767		266.6%
1980	1,892		7.1%
1990	2,181		15.3%
2000	1,972		−9.6%
2010	1,885		−4.4%
2020	1,811		−3.9%
2023 (est.)	1,813	▲	0.1%
Population sources: 1910–2000 1910–1920 1910; 1910–1930 1940–2000; 2000 2010 2020

=== 2010 census ===
The 2010 United States census counted 1,885 people, 688 households, and 526 families in the borough. The population density was 229.8 per square mile (88.7/km^{2}). There were 717 housing units at an average density of 87.4 per square mile (33.7/km^{2}). The racial makeup was 90.93% (1,714) White, 4.19% (79) Black or African American, 0.16% (3) Native American, 0.85% (16) Asian, 0.16% (3) Pacific Islander, 1.86% (35) from other races, and 1.86% (35) from two or more races. Hispanic or Latino of any race were 6.74% (127) of the population.

Of the 688 households, 28.2% had children under the age of 18; 60.5% were married couples living together; 11.8% had a female householder with no husband present and 23.5% were non-families. Of all households, 17.4% were made up of individuals and 6.1% had someone living alone who was 65 years of age or older. The average household size was 2.73 and the average family size was 3.08.

22.1% of the population were under the age of 18, 8.0% from 18 to 24, 25.1% from 25 to 44, 33.7% from 45 to 64, and 11.1% who were 65 years of age or older. The median age was 41.8 years. For every 100 females, the population had 98.8 males. For every 100 females ages 18 and older there were 96.7 males.

The Census Bureau's 2006–2010 American Community Survey showed that (in 2010 inflation-adjusted dollars) median household income was $65,795 (with a margin of error of +/− $5,755) and the median family income was $67,778 (+/− $7,595). Males had a median income of $50,192 (+/− $6,784) versus $36,471 (+/− $4,204) for females. The per capita income for the borough was $29,446 (+/− $2,979). About 3.2% of families and 5.6% of the population were below the poverty line, including 6.9% of those under age 18 and 8.9% of those age 65 or over.

=== 2000 census ===
As of the 2000 United States census there were 1,972 people, 671 households, and 552 families residing in the borough. The population density was 238.5 inhabitants per square mile (92.1/km^{2}). There were 702 housing units at an average density of 84.9 per square mile (32.8/km^{2}). The racial makeup of the borough was 91.73% White, 4.41% African American, 0.15% Native American, 0.86% Asian, 0.15% Pacific Islander, 1.57% from other races, and 1.12% from two or more races. 3.45% of the population were Hispanic or Latino of any race.

There were 671 households, out of which 37.1% had children under the age of 18 living with them, 64.4% were married couples living together, 14.2% had a female householder with no husband present, and 17.7% were non-families. 13.7% of all households were made up of individuals, and 3.9% had someone living alone who was 65 years of age or older. The average household size was 2.93 and the average family size was 3.18.

In the borough the population was spread out, with 24.9% under the age of 18, 8.8% from 18 to 24, 30.0% from 25 to 44, 26.5% from 45 to 64, and 9.8% who were 65 years of age or older. The median age was 38 years. For every 100 females, there were 96.2 males. For every 100 females age 18 and over, there were 92.6 males.

The median income for a household in the borough was $56,406, and the median income for a family was $59,231. Males had a median income of $39,659 versus $30,000 for females. The per capita income for the borough was $20,617. 5.7% of the population and 4.2% of families were below the poverty line. Out of the total population, 4.3% of those under the age of 18 and 4.9% of those 65 and older were living below the poverty line.

== Government ==
=== Local government ===
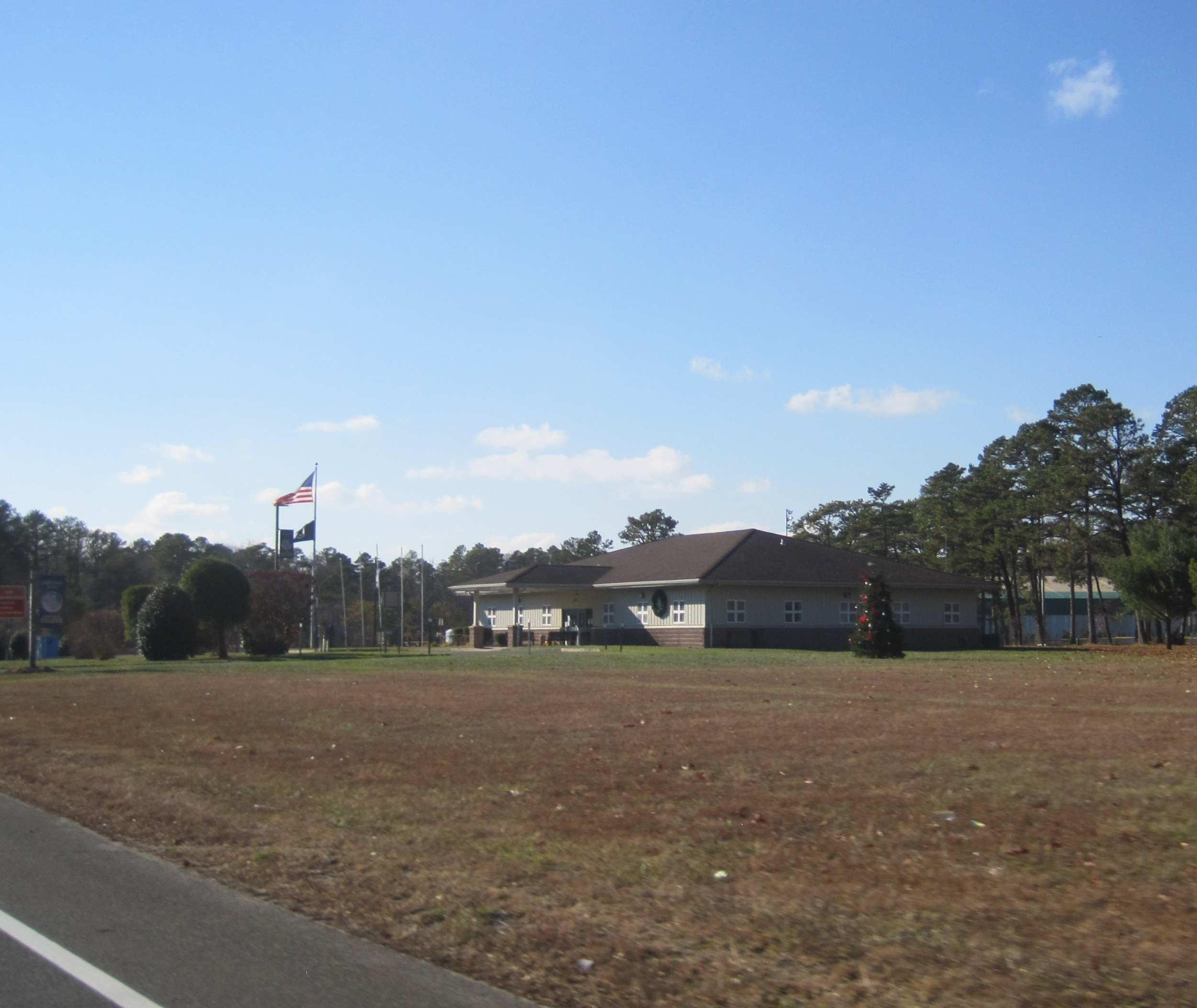
Municipal complex

Folsom is governed under the borough form of New Jersey municipal government, which is used in 218 municipalities (of the 564) statewide, making it the most common form of government in New Jersey. The governing body is comprised of the mayor and the borough council, with all positions elected at-large on a partisan basis as part of the November general election. The mayor is elected directly by the voters to a four-year term of office. The borough council includes six members elected to serve three-year terms on a staggered basis, with two seats coming up for election each year in a three-year cycle. The borough form of government used by Folsom is a "weak mayor / strong council" government in which council members act as the legislative body with the mayor presiding at meetings and voting only in the event of a tie. The mayor can veto ordinances subject to an override by a two-thirds majority vote of the council. The mayor makes committee and liaison assignments for council members, and most appointments are made by the mayor with the advice and consent of the council.

As of 2024, the mayor of Folsom is Republican Glenn Smith, whose term of office ends December 31, 2025. Members of the Borough Council are Council President Gregory Conway (R, 2024), Jacob Blazer (R, 2023), James Hoffman (R, 2025), Albert W. Norman Jr. (R, 2024), Michael Porretta (R, 2025) and James C. Whittaker Jr. (R, 2023).

In January 2020, the borough council appointed Jake Blazer to fill the balance of the term expiring in December 2021 that had been held by Greg Schenker until he resigned from office.

In September 2016, the borough council selected Lisa O'Toole from a list of three candidates nominated by the Republican municipal committee to fill the seat expiring in December 2018 that had been vacated by Bryan Gummoe, who resigned the previous month. In the November 2016 general election, Independent Greg Schenker defeated O'Toole to win the balance of the term of office.

The borough council selected Louis DeStefano in August 2014 from among three names offered by the Republican municipal committee to fill the vacant seat of Mayor Thomas N. Ballistreri, who had resigned earlier that month. In September 2014, Bennett Pagano was selected by the borough council from among the three candidates recommended by the local Republican Committee to fill Louis DeStefano's vacant council seat. Pagano was elected in November 2014 to serve the balance of the term.

=== Federal, state and county representation ===
Folsom is located in the 2nd Congressional District and is part of New Jersey's 8th state legislative district.

For the 119th United States Congress, New Jersey's 2nd congressional district is represented by Jeff Van Drew (R, Dennis Township). New Jersey is represented in the United States Senate by Democrats Cory Booker (Newark, term ends 2027) and Andy Kim (Moorestown, term ends 2031).

For the 2026–2027 session, the 8th legislative district of the New Jersey Legislature is represented in the New Jersey Senate by Latham Tiver (R, Southampton Township) and in the General Assembly by Anthony Angelozzi (D, Hammonton) and Andrea Katz (D, Chesterfield Township).

Atlantic County is governed by a directly elected county executive and a nine-member Board of County Commissioners, responsible for legislation. The executive serves a four-year term and the commissioners are elected to staggered three-year terms, of which four are elected from the county on an at-large basis and five of the commissioners represent equally populated districts. As of 2025, Atlantic County's Executive is Dennis Levinson (R, Northfield), whose term of office ends December 31, 2027. Members of the Board of County Commissioners are:

Ernest D. Coursey (D, District 1-- Atlantic City, Egg Harbor Township (part), Longport, Margate City, and Ventnor City; 2025, Atlantic City), Chair Maureen Kern (R, District 2-- Egg Harbor Township (part), Linwood, Northfield, Somers Point and Pleasantville; 2027, Somers Point), Andrew Parker III (R, District 3-- Egg Harbor Township (part) and Hamilton Township (part); 2026, Egg Harbor Township), Richard R. Dase (R, District 4, including Brigantine, Galloway Township, Egg Harbor Township (part), and Port Republic; 2025, Galloway Township), Vice Chair James A. Bertino (R, District 5-- Buena, Buena Vista Township, Corbin City, Egg Harbor City, Estell Manor, Folsom, Hamilton Township (part), Hammonton, Mullica Township and Weymouth Township; 2027, Hammonton), June Byrnes (R, At-Large; 2026, Linwood), Michael Ruffu (R, At-Large; Margate, 2027) Amy L. Gatto (R, At-large; 2025, Hamilton Township) and John W. Risley (R, At-Large; 2026, Egg Harbor Township)

Atlantic County's constitutional officers are: Clerk Joesph J. Giralo (R, 2026, Hammonton), Sheriff Joe O'Donoghue (R, 2026, Egg Harbor Township) and Surrogate James Curcio (R, 2025, Hammonton).

=== Politics ===
As of March 2011, there were a total of 1,229 registered voters in Folsom, of which 252 (20.5% vs. 30.5% countywide) were registered as Democrats, 355 (28.9% vs. 25.2%) were registered as Republicans and 622 (50.6% vs. 44.3%) were registered as Unaffiliated. There were no voters registered to other parties. Among the borough's 2010 Census population, 65.2% (vs. 58.8% in Atlantic County) were registered to vote, including 83.7% of those ages 18 and over (vs. 76.6% countywide).

Gubernatorial election results for Folsom
Year	Republican		Democratic		Third party(ies)	
Year	No.	%	No.	%	No.	%
2025	446	60.03%	293	39.43%	4	0.54%
2021	467	71.74%	180	27.65%	4	0.61%
2017	251	56.79%	178	40.27%	13	2.94%
2013	392	69.26%	168	29.68%	6	1.06%
2009	329	58.75%	198	35.36%	33	5.89%
2005	278	51.87%	228	42.54%	30	5.60%

In the 2012 presidential election, Republican Mitt Romney received 442 votes (49.9% vs. 41.1% countywide), ahead of Democrat Barack Obama with 427 votes (48.2% vs. 57.9%) and other candidates with 10 votes (1.1% vs. 0.9%), among the 886 ballots cast by the borough's 1,257 registered voters, for a turnout of 70.5% (vs. 65.8% in Atlantic County). In the 2008 presidential election, Republican John McCain received 457 votes (50.2% vs. 41.6% countywide), ahead of Democrat Barack Obama with 441 votes (48.4% vs. 56.5%) and other candidates with 5 votes (0.5% vs. 1.1%), among the 911 ballots cast by the borough's 1,282 registered voters, for a turnout of 71.1% (vs. 68.1% in Atlantic County). In the 2004 presidential election, Republican George W. Bush received 482 votes (52.2% vs. 46.2% countywide), ahead of Democrat John Kerry with 425 votes (46.0% vs. 52.0%) and other candidates with 6 votes (0.7% vs. 0.8%), among the 923 ballots cast by the borough's 1,267 registered voters, for a turnout of 72.8% (vs. 69.8% in the whole county).

Presidential elections results
Year	Republican	Democratic	Third Parties
2024	65.6% 649	32.9% 326	1.5% 15
2020	62.5% 672	35.3% 380	1.2% 24
2016	60.8% 511	36.2% 304	3.0% 25
2012	49.9% 442	48.2% 427	1.1% 10
2008	50.2% 457	48.4% 441	0.5% 5
2004	52.2% 482	46.0% 425	0.7% 6

In the 2013 gubernatorial election, Republican Chris Christie received 392 votes (68.1% vs. 60.0% countywide), ahead of Democrat Barbara Buono with 168 votes (29.2% vs. 34.9%) and other candidates with 6 votes (1.0% vs. 1.3%), among the 576 ballots cast by the borough's 1,265 registered voters, yielding a 45.5% turnout (vs. 41.5% in the county). In the 2009 gubernatorial election, Republican Chris Christie received 329 votes (57.7% vs. 47.7% countywide), ahead of Democrat Jon Corzine with 198 votes (34.7% vs. 44.5%), Independent Chris Daggett with 27 votes (4.7% vs. 4.8%) and other candidates with 6 votes (1.1% vs. 1.2%), among the 570 ballots cast by the borough's 1,246 registered voters, yielding a 45.7% turnout (vs. 44.9% in the county).

United States Senate election results for Folsom1
Year	Republican		Democratic		Third party(ies)	
Year	No.	%	No.	%	No.	%
2024	603	63.67%	325	34.32%	19	2.01%
2018	381	63.29%	209	34.72%	12	1.99%
2012	403	49.03%	397	48.30%	22	2.68%
2006	287	52.76%	243	44.67%	14	2.57%

United States Senate election results for Folsom2
Year	Republican		Democratic		Third party(ies)	
Year	No.	%	No.	%	No.	%
2020	649	62.22%	367	35.19%	27	2.59%
2014	311	59.46%	190	36.33%	22	4.21%
2013	166	61.71%	100	37.17%	3	1.12%
2008	419	50.18%	398	47.66%	18	2.16%

== Education ==
The Folsom Borough School District serves public school students in pre-kindergarten through eighth grade at Folsom School. As of the 2022–23 school year, the district, comprised of one school, had an enrollment of 384 students and 41.0 classroom teachers (on an FTE basis), for a student–teacher ratio of 9.4:1.

For ninth through twelfth grades, public school students attend Hammonton High School, in Hammonton as part of a sending/receiving relationship with the Hammonton Public Schools, alongside students from Waterford Township, who attend for grades 7-12 as part of an agreement with the Waterford Township School District. As of the 2022–23 school year, the high school had an enrollment of 1,357 students and 92.6 classroom teachers (on an FTE basis), for a student–teacher ratio of 14.7:1.

Resident students are also eligible to attend the Atlantic County Institute of Technology in the Mays Landing section of Hamilton Township or the Charter-Tech High School for the Performing Arts, located in Somers Point.

== Transportation ==
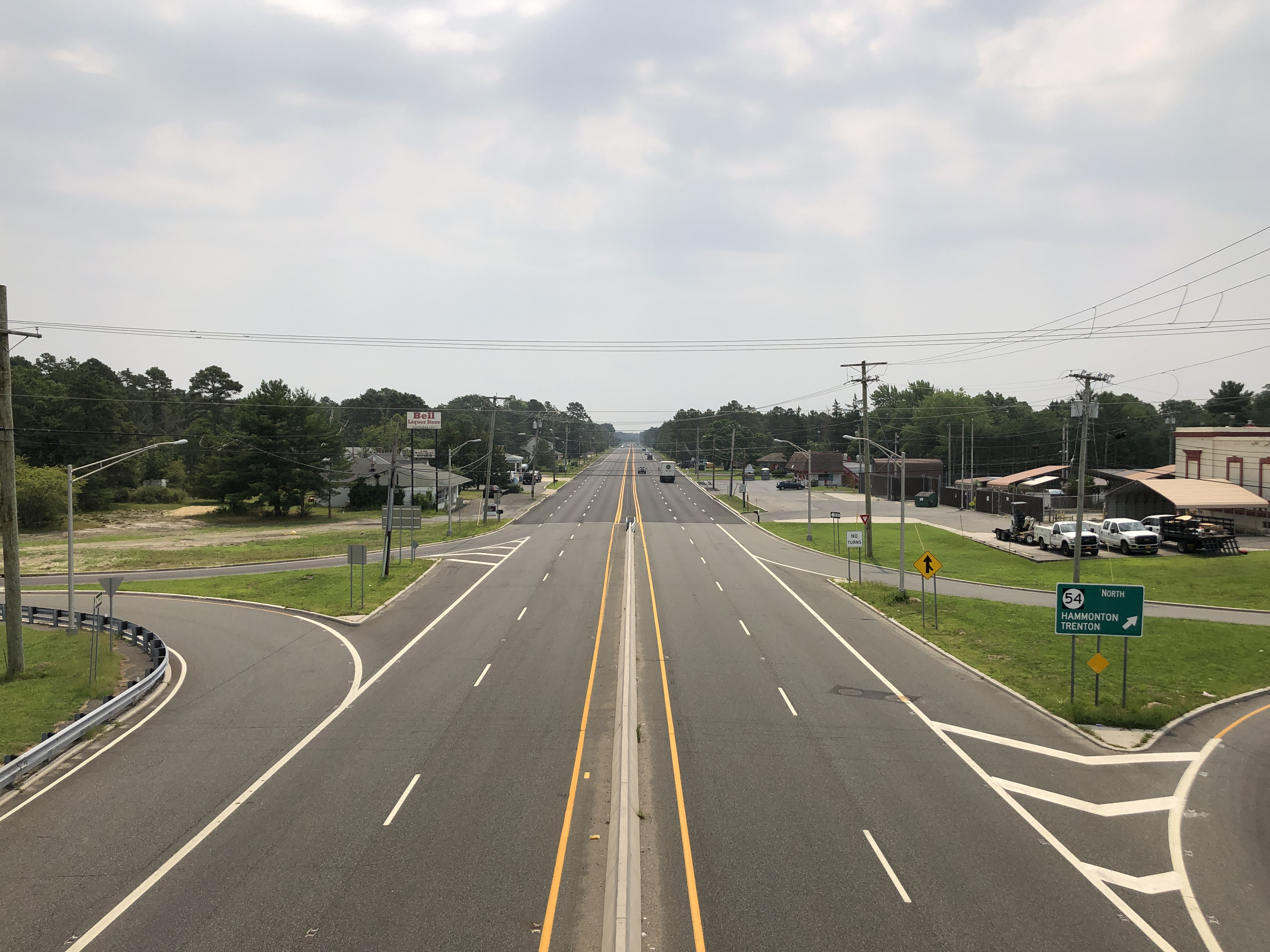
U.S. Route 322 (Black Horse Pike) eastbound in Folsom

=== Roads and highways ===
As of May 2010, the borough had a total of 27.69 miles (44.56 km) of roadways, of which 17.32 miles (27.87 km) were maintained by the municipality, 4.00 miles (6.44 km) by Atlantic County and 6.37 miles (10.25 km) by the New Jersey Department of Transportation.

Three significant highways directly serve Folsom. U.S. Route 322 follows the Black Horse Pike across the borough from northwest to southeast, connecting Folsom to Monroe Township and Hamilton Township. New Jersey Route 54 is oriented northeast to southwest across the borough, linking Folsom with Hammonton and Buena Vista Township. New Jersey Route 73 heads north from U.S. Route 322, briefly clipping Hammonton before entering Winslow Township.

=== Public transportation ===
NJ Transit provides bus service on the 315 route that runs between Cape May and Philadelphia.

== Notable people ==
People who were born in, residents of, or otherwise closely associated with Folsom include:

- Jimmy Horton (born 1956), race car driver
- Kenneth LeFevre (born 1945), member of the New Jersey General Assembly from 1996 to 2002
- E. B. Lewis (born 1956), illustrator who won the 2006 Charlotte Zolotow Award for his illustrations of My Best Friend by Mary Ann Rodman
- Elizabeth Eckhardt May (1899–1996), home economist, educator and college administrator.
- G. R. Smith (born 1981), professional Dirt Late Model driver and team owner who has previously raced in the NASCAR Craftsman Truck Series and ARCA Menards Series
