= Hammonton High School =

High school in New Jersey, United States

Location
- 566 Old Forks Road; Hammonton, Atlantic County, New Jersey 08037; United States
- 39.6565°N 74.8073°W

Information
- Type: Public high school
- Established: 1925
- School district: Hammonton Public Schools
- NCES School ID: 340657000136
- Principal: Michael Mattina
- Faculty: 94.4 FTEs
- Grades: 9-12
- Enrollment: 1,315 (as of 2024–25)
- Student to teacher ratio: 13.9:1
- Colors: Royal Blue and white
- Athletics conference: Cape-Atlantic League (general); West Jersey Football League (football)
- Team name: Blue Devils
- Website: hhs.hammontonschools.org

Hammonton High School is a comprehensive community public high school that serves students in ninth through twelfth grades from Hammonton, in Atlantic County, in the U.S. state of New Jersey, operating as the lone secondary school of the Hammonton Public Schools.

Students from Folsom Borough and Waterford Township attend Hammonton High School as part of sending/receiving relationships with the Folsom Borough School District and the Waterford Township School District.

As of the 2024–25 school year, the school had an enrollment of 1,315 students and 94.4 classroom teachers (on an FTE basis), for a student–teacher ratio of 13.9:1. There were 365 students (27.8% of enrollment) eligible for free lunch and 88 (6.7% of students) eligible for reduced-cost lunch.

== History ==
The first school building was constructed in 1925 and used as a middle school building starting in 1966 when a new facility was completed on Liberty Street.

Opened in 2002, Hammonton High School is the newest school facility of the Hammonton Public Schools. The school's 196,000-square-foot (18,200 m^{2}) facility on a campus covering 118 acres (48 ha) was constructed at a cost of $33 million and opened with 1,200 students from Hammonton, as well as those from Waterford Township who shifted to Hammonton High School after the Lower Camden County Regional School District was dissolved.

== Awards, recognition and rankings ==
Hammonton High School's boys' swimming and diving team was recognized with the Boys Gold Award by the 2005-06 NISCA/Kiefer Scholar Team Award.

The school was the 229th-ranked public high school in New Jersey out of 339 schools statewide in New Jersey Monthly magazine's September 2014 cover story on the state's "Top Public High Schools", using a new ranking methodology. The school had been ranked 288th in the state of 328 schools in 2012, after being ranked 233rd in 2010 out of 322 schools listed. The magazine ranked the school 239th in 2008 out of 316 schools. The school was ranked 233rd in the magazine's September 2006 issue, which surveyed 316 schools across the state. Schooldigger.com ranked the school tied for 175th out of 381 public high schools statewide in its 2011 rankings (an increase of 44 positions from the 2010 ranking) which were based on the combined percentage of students classified as proficient or above proficient on the mathematics (81.2%) and language arts literacy (92.4%) components of the High School Proficiency Assessment (HSPA).

== Student activities ==
The school offers a wide range of clubs for students to participate in, centering around different activities including music, community service, arts, academics, society, and more. There are 31 different clubs, some of which are selective to join. The school offers a student council where student leaders are elected to plan events like pep rallies for the students, and make decisions for the overall student body. Hammonton High School has a chapter of The National Honor Society, an honor-based club students must apply to join. The National Honor Society and other clubs like Leo Club, Key Club, and Interact Club all center around community service in the school's area.

== Athletics ==
The Hammonton High School Blue Devils compete in the Cape-Atlantic League, an athletic conference comprised of public and private high schools in Atlantic, Cape May, Cumberland and Gloucester counties, that operates under the supervision of the New Jersey State Interscholastic Athletic Association (NJSIAA). The school, a founding member of the Cape-Atlantic League in 1949, had been a member of the Tri-County Conference from 2014 to 2020, returning to the Cape-Atlantic League for the 2020–21 school year. With 1,071 students in grades 10–12, the school was classified by the NJSIAA for the 2019–20 school year as Group IV for most athletic competition purposes, which included schools with an enrollment of 1,060 to 5,049 students in that grade range. The football team competes in the Memorial Division of the 94-team West Jersey Football League superconference and was classified by the NJSIAA as Group IV South for football for 2024–2026, which included schools with 890 to 1,298 students.

The softball team won the Group I state championship in 1980 (defeating Roselle Park High School in the tournament final) and the Group II title in 1986 (vs. Jefferson Township High School). After losing in the finals in both 1977 and 1979, the 1980 team used seven runs scored in the second inning to carry them to the program's first state title with a 7–2 victory in the Group I championship game against Roselle Park played at Mercer County Park. The 1986 team finished the season with a 30–3 record after taking the Group I title with a 4–1 win in extra innings against Jefferson Township in the championship game. The team won the 2007 South, Group III state sectional championship with a 6–5 win over Central Regional High School.

The football team won the NJSIAA South Jersey Group II state sectional championship in 1985, 1993, 1994 and 1996, won the South Jersey Group III sectional in 2009 and the Central Jersey Group IV title in 2019. In its seventh year in the playoffs, the 1985 team won the program's first title after defeating Haddon Heights High School in the South Jersey Group II championship game to end the season with a 9–2 record. The team won the 2009 South Jersey Group III sectional championship with a 23–17 win over Timber Creek Regional High School, the program's first Group III title. The 2019 team won the Central Jersey Group IV title with a 28–12 win against Jackson Memorial High School.

The girls' field hockey team won the South Jersey Group II state sectional title in 1996 and lost to West Essex High School in the Group II finals.

The boys' wrestling team won the South Jersey Group III state sectional championship in 2009.

== Marching band ==
The school's marching band was Chapter One champions in 1973-1979 (Group 3), 1980-1981 (Group 4), 1983 (Group 3), 1989-1990 (Group 2) and 1998 (Group 1). The marching band was Atlantic Coast Champion in Group 3 every year from 1974 to 1979 and again in 1983. The band was the All-State Champion in 2002 and 2005, and the State Champion in 2004 in USSBA competition. The band also won state championships in 2008 USSBA competition as well as in 2016.

== Administration ==
The school's principal is Michael Mattina. His administration team includes two assistant principals.

== Notable people ==
- Ashante "Thee" Adonis (born 1990 as Tehuti Miles, class of 2008), professional wrestler with SmackDown
- Anthony Angelozzi, U.S. history teacher who serves in the New Jersey General Assembly
- Elizabeth Eckhardt May (1899–1996), home economist, educator and college administrator, who was dean of the School of Home Economics at the University of Connecticut
- Ron Previte (1943–2017), corrupt police officer for the Philadelphia Police Department and a member of and an informant against the Philadelphia crime family
- Tony Siscone (born 1950, class of 1967), asphalt modified racecar driver
- Michael Torrissi (born 1974, class of 1993), politician who served in the New Jersey General Assembly from the 8th Legislative District from 2022 to 2026
