= Hammonton Gazette =

Newspaper in Hammonton, New Jersey

The Hammonton Gazette
- Front page of March 30, 2011
- Type: Weekly newspaper
- Owner(s): LNN USA LLC (Bobby Capoferri & Craig Richards)
- Founder: Gabriel J. Donio
- Founded: 1997
- Language: English
- Headquarters: Hammonton, New Jersey
- Website: hammontongazette.com

The Hammonton Gazette is a weekly local newspaper located in Hammonton, New Jersey.

The Gazette was founded in 1997 by Gabriel J. Donio. The first print edition was published on July 2, 1997. Each Wednesday, the newspaper is distributed throughout Hammonton and the surrounding area. The newspaper primarily covers the town of Hammonton, focusing on local news, politics, businesses and residents. The publication was briefly owned by a media company from the Midwest before returning to local ownership when LNN USA, owned by local businessmen Robert Capoferri and Craig Richards, purchased the newspaper in 2025.

== Sections ==
The paper's sections include:

- News
- Opinion'
- Our Town
- Noticias: news and sports through Spanish
- Neighbors: Coverage of towns that surround Hammonton, including Folsom, Waterford Twp. (Atco), Mullica Twp., Egg Harbor City, Winslow Twp., Collings Lakes, Vineland, Buena Vista Twp., Buena, Shamong and Medford
- Comics
- Arts & Entertainment
- Health & Fitness
- Cuisine
- Sports

== Hammy Awards ==

Since 1998, the Gazette has given out "Hammy Awards" to local people and organizations. Categories include Restaurant, People, Miscellaneous, Food, Drinks and more.

The Hammontonian Magazine

The Hammontonian Magazine is a quarterly publication distributed within the print edition of The Gazette on newsstands and subscriptions. The magazine debuted on January 19, 2022.
