= Waterford Township, New Jersey =

Township in Camden County, New Jersey, US

- Township
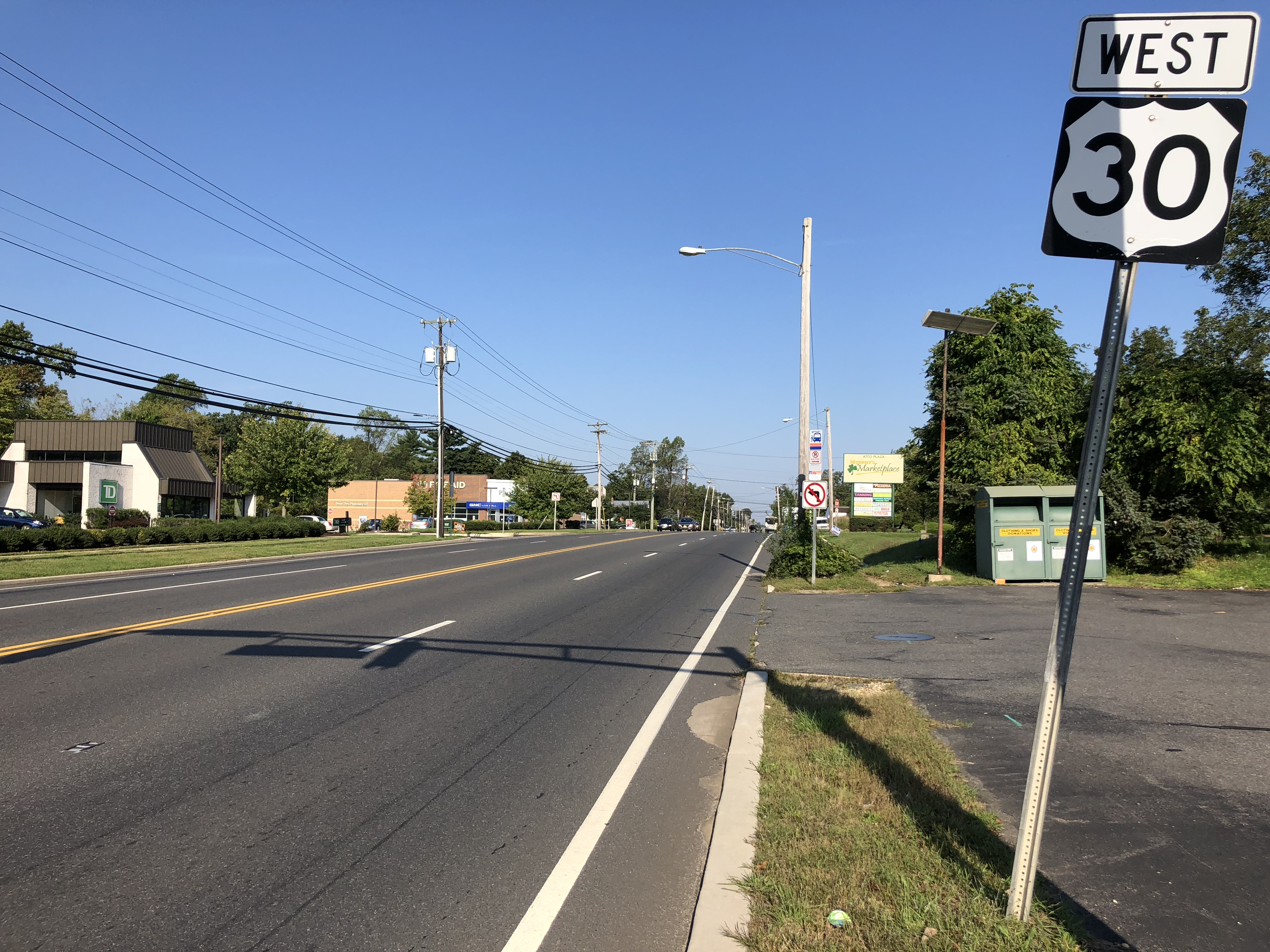
- U.S. Route 30 westbound in Waterford Township

- wordmark
- Motto: "Proud Past, Promising Future"
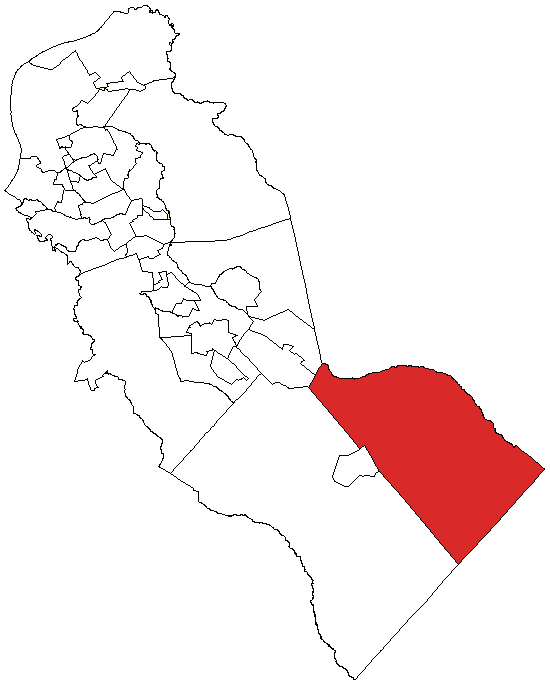
- Waterford highlighted in Camden County. Inset: Location of Camden County highlighted in the State of New Jersey.

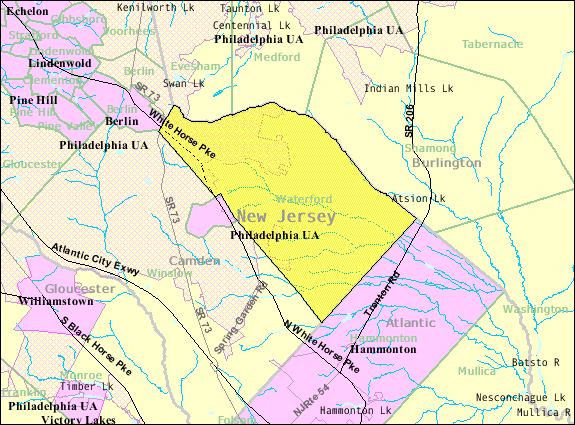
- Census Bureau map of Waterford Township, New Jersey

- Location in Camden County Location in New Jersey Location in the United States
- Coordinates: 39.743214°N 74.820861°W
- Country: United States
- State: New Jersey
- County: Camden
- Royal charter: June 1, 1695
- Incorporated: February 21, 1798
- Named for: Waterford, Ireland

Government
  - Type: Township
  - Body: Township Committee
  - Mayor: Thomas Giangiulio Jr. (R, term ends December 31, 2023)
  - Administrator: Vacant
  - Municipal clerk: Dawn M. Liedtka

Area
  - Total: 36.22 sq mi (93.81 km^{2})
  - Land: 36.00 sq mi (93.25 km^{2})
  - Water: 0.22 sq mi (0.56 km^{2}) 0.60%
  - Rank: 66th of 565 in state 2nd of 37 in county
- Elevation: 89 ft (27 m)

Population (2020)
  - Total: 10,421
  - Estimate (2023): 10,439
  - Rank: 236th of 565 in state 14th of 37 in county
  - Density: 289.5/sq mi (111.8/km^{2})
  - Rank: 478th of 565 in state 35th of 37 in county
- Time zone: UTC−05:00 (Eastern (EST))
  - Summer (DST): UTC−04:00 (Eastern (EDT))
- ZIP Code: 08089 – Waterford Works
- Area code: 856
- FIPS code: 3400777630
- GNIS feature ID: 0882151
- Website: www.waterfordtwp.org

Waterford Township is a township in Camden County, in the U.S. state of New Jersey. As of the 2020 United States census, the township's population was 10,421, a decrease of 228 (−2.1%) from the 2010 census count of 10,649, which in turn reflected an increase of 155 (+1.5%) from the 10,494 counted in the 2000 census.

Waterford Township was originally created by Royal charter on June 1, 1695, while the area was still part of Gloucester County. The township was incorporated by an act of the New Jersey Legislature on February 21, 1798. On March 13, 1844, Waterford Township became one of the original townships in the newly created Camden County. The settlement of Long-a-Coming (now the borough of Berlin) along the White Horse Pike (U.S. Route 30) in Waterford was the new county's first seat, but lost that designation in 1848 when the seat moved to the city of Camden. Portions of the township were taken over the years to form Delaware Township (on February 28, 1844, now Cherry Hill), Chesilhurst (November 26, 1887), Voorhees Township (March 1, 1899) and Berlin Township (March 11, 1910). The township was named for Waterford, Ireland.

== Geography ==
According to the United States Census Bureau, the township had a total area of 36.22 square miles (93.81 km^{2}), including 36.00 square miles (93.25 km^{2}) of land and 0.22 square miles (0.56 km^{2}) of water (0.60%).

Unincorporated communities, localities and place names located partially or completely within the borough include Atco, Atco Lake, Bishops, Dunbarton, Fisher, Jackson, Louden and Pestletown.

The township borders the municipalities of Berlin, Berlin Township, Chesilhurst and Winslow Township in Camden County; Hammonton in Atlantic County; and Evesham Township, Medford Township and Shamong Township in Burlington County.

== Demographics ==
Historical population
Census	Pop.	Note	%±
1800	1,629		—
1810	2,105		29.2%
1820	2,447		16.2%
1830	3,088		26.2%
1840	3,467		12.3%
1850	1,638	*	−52.8%
1860	1,955		19.4%
1870	2,071		5.9%
1880	2,149		3.8%
1890	2,421	*	12.7%
1900	2,161	*	−10.7%
1910	1,484	*	−31.3%
1920	1,917		29.2%
1930	2,421		26.3%
1940	2,750		13.6%
1950	2,997		9.0%
1960	3,809		27.1%
1970	4,073		6.9%
1980	8,126		99.5%
1990	10,940		34.6%
2000	10,494		−4.1%
2010	10,649		1.5%
2020	10,421		−2.1%
2023 (est.)	10,439		0.2%
Population sources: 1800–1840 1850–2000; 1800–1920 1840 1850–1870; 1850 1870 1880–1890; 1890–1910 1910–1930; 1940–2000 2000; 2010 2020 * = Lost territory in previous decade.

=== 2010 census ===
The 2010 United States census counted 10,649 people, 3,692 households, and 2,824 families in the township. The population density was 295.5 per square mile (114.1/km^{2}). There were 3,839 housing units at an average density of 106.5 per square mile (41.1/km^{2}). The racial makeup was 90.59% (9,647) White, 4.83% (514) Black or African American, 0.10% (11) Native American, 1.16% (124) Asian, 0.03% (3) Pacific Islander, 1.56% (166) from other races, and 1.73% (184) from two or more races. Hispanic or Latino of any race were 4.39% (467) of the population.

Of the 3,692 households, 32.9% had children under the age of 18; 60.4% were married couples living together; 10.6% had a female householder with no husband present and 23.5% were non-families. Of all households, 17.9% were made up of individuals and 6.0% had someone living alone who was 65 years of age or older. The average household size was 2.84 and the average family size was 3.22.

22.9% of the population were under the age of 18, 8.6% from 18 to 24, 26.5% from 25 to 44, 32.1% from 45 to 64, and 9.9% who were 65 years of age or older. The median age was 39.7 years. For every 100 females, the population had 101.0 males. For every 100 females ages 18 and older there were 98.0 males.

The Census Bureau's 2006–2010 American Community Survey showed that (in 2010 inflation-adjusted dollars) median household income was $76,786 (with a margin of error of +/− $9,237) and the median family income was $87,774 (+/− $9,978). Males had a median income of $54,714 (+/− $3,576) versus $42,896 (+/− $4,994) for females. The per capita income for the borough was $31,193 (+/− $2,094). About 2.6% of families and 5.5% of the population were below the poverty line, including 7.0% of those under age 18 and 7.7% of those age 65 or over.

=== 2000 census ===
As of the 2000 United States census there were 10,494 people, 3,542 households, and 2,791 families residing in the township. The population density was 290.0 inhabitants per square mile (112.0/km^{2}). There were 3,671 housing units at an average density of 101.4 per square mile (39.2/km^{2}). The racial makeup of the township was 92.75% White, 4.18% African American, 0.21% Native American, 0.90% Asian, 0.01% Pacific Islander, 0.67% from other races, and 1.29% from two or more races. Hispanic or Latino of any race were 2.07% of the population.

There were 3,542 households, out of which 39.0% had children under the age of 18 living with them, 64.5% were married couples living together, 9.7% had a female householder with no husband present, and 21.2% were non-families. 16.7% of all households were made up of individuals, and 5.3% had someone living alone who was 65 years of age or older. The average household size was 2.90 and the average family size was 3.27.

In the township the population was spread out, with 25.7% under the age of 18, 8.2% from 18 to 24, 32.6% from 25 to 44, 25.4% from 45 to 64, and 8.1% who were 65 years of age or older. The median age was 36 years. For every 100 females, there were 100.3 males. For every 100 females age 18 and over, there were 99.6 males.

The median income for a household in the township was $59,075, and the median income for a family was $63,693. Males had a median income of $41,561 versus $28,763 for females. The per capita income for the township was $21,676. About 3.6% of families and 5.6% of the population were below the poverty line, including 4.9% of those under age 18 and 7.8% of those age 65 or over.

== Government ==
=== Local government ===
Waterford Township is governed under the Township form of New Jersey municipal government, one of 141 municipalities (of the 564) statewide that use this form, the second-most commonly used form of government in the state. The Township Committee is comprised of five members, who are elected directly by the voters at-large in partisan elections to serve three-year terms of office on a staggered basis, with either one or two seats coming up for election each year as part of the November general election in a three-year cycle. The Mayor and Deputy Mayor are chosen by the Township Committee from among its members during a reorganization meeting held each January.

As of 2023, members of the Waterford Township Committee are Mayor Thomas Giangiulio Jr. (R, term on committee and as mayor ends 2023), Depuy Mayor Andrew L. Wade (I, term on committee ends December 31, 2024; term as deputy mayor ends 2023), Stephanie Jones-Freitag (R, 2025), Joel Thompson (R, 2025) and Richard T. Yeatman Sr. (D, 2023).

=== Federal, state, and county representation ===
Waterford Township is located in the 1st Congressional District and is part of New Jersey's 4th state legislative district.

For the 119th United States Congress, New Jersey's 1st congressional district is represented by Donald Norcross (D, Camden). New Jersey is represented in the United States Senate by Democrats Cory Booker (Newark, term ends 2027) and Andy Kim (Moorestown, term ends 2031).

For the 2026–2027 session, the 4th legislative district of the New Jersey Legislature is represented in the State Senate by Paul D. Moriarty (D, Washington Township) and in the General Assembly by Dan Hutchison (D, Gloucester Township) and Cody Miller (D, Monroe Township).

Camden County is governed by a Board of County Commissioners composed of seven members chosen at-large in partisan elections for three-year terms on a staggered basis by the residents of the county, with either two or three seats up for election each year as part of the November general election. At a reorganization meeting held in January after each election, the newly constituted Board of Commissioners selects one member to serve as Director and another as Deputy Director, each serving a one-year term in that role. As of 2025, Camden County's Commissioners are: Commissioner Director Louis Cappelli Jr. (D, Collingswood, 2026), Commissioner Deputy Director Edward T. McDonnell (D, Pennsauken Township, 2025), Virginia Ruiz Betteridge (D, Runnemede, 2025), Almar Dyer (D, Pennsauken Township, 2027), Melinda Kane (D, Cherry Hill, 2027), Jeffrey L. Nash (D, Winslow Township, 2027), and Jonathan L. Young Sr. (D, Berlin Township, 2026).

Camden County's constitutional officers are: Clerk Pamela Rosen Lampitt (D, Cherry Hill, 2029) Sheriff Chuck Billingham (D, Gloucester City, 2027) and Surrogate Michelle Gentek-Mayer (D, Gloucester Township, 2025).

=== Politics ===
As of March 2011, there were a total of 7,364 registered voters in Waterford Township, of which 2,438 (33.1%) were registered as Democrats, 1,386 (18.8%) were registered as Republicans and 3,536 (48.0%) were registered as Unaffiliated. There were 4 voters registered as Libertarians or Greens.

Gubernatorial election results for Waterford Township
Year	Republican		Democratic		Third party(ies)	
Year	No.	%	No.	%	No.	%
2025	2,694	58.49%	1,882	40.86%	30	0.65%
2021	2,471	63.02%	1,420	36.22%	30	0.77%
2017	1,538	52.80%	1,286	44.15%	89	3.06%
2013	2,353	71.63%	889	27.06%	43	1.31%
2009	1,749	54.90%	1,168	36.66%	269	8.44%
2005	1,503	46.29%	1,572	48.41%	172	5.30%

In the 2012 presidential election, Democrat Barack Obama received 50.4% of the vote (2,501 cast), ahead of Republican Mitt Romney with 48.5% (2,406 votes), and other candidates with 1.2% (58 votes), among the 5,012 ballots cast by the township's 7,783 registered voters (47 ballots were spoiled), for a turnout of 64.4%. In the 2008 presidential election, Democrat Barack Obama received 50.0% of the vote (2,708 cast), ahead of Republican John McCain, who received around 46.5% (2,517 votes), with 5,411 ballots cast among the township's 7,323 registered voters, for a turnout of 73.9%. In the 2004 presidential election, Republican George W. Bush received 49.3% of the vote (2,582 ballots cast), outpolling Democrat John Kerry, who received around 47.1% (2,468 votes), with 5,242 ballots cast among the township's 7,107 registered voters, for a turnout percentage of 73.8.

United States presidential election results for Waterford Township
Year	Republican		Democratic		Third party(ies)	
Year	No.	%	No.	%	No.	%
2024	3,657	61.44%	2,225	37.38%	70	1.18%
2020	3,589	57.88%	2,523	40.69%	89	1.44%
2016	2,968	57.45%	2,007	38.85%	191	3.70%
2012	2,406	48.46%	2,501	50.37%	58	1.17%
2008	2,517	46.52%	2,708	50.05%	186	3.44%
2004	2,582	49.26%	2,468	47.08%	192	3.66%

In the 2013 gubernatorial election, Republican Chris Christie received 70.7% of the vote (2,253 cast), ahead of Democrat Barbara Buono with 27.9% (889 votes), and other candidates with 1.4% (43 votes), among the 3,271 ballots cast by the township's 7,828 registered voters (86 ballots were spoiled), for a turnout of 41.8%. In the 2009 gubernatorial election, Republican Chris Christie received 54.9% of the vote (1,749 ballots cast), ahead of both Democrat Jon Corzine with 36.7% (1,168 votes) and Independent Chris Daggett with 4.9% (155 votes), with 3,186 ballots cast among the township's 7,462 registered voters, yielding a 42.7% turnout.

United States Senate election results for Waterford Township1
Year	Republican		Democratic		Third party(ies)	
Year	No.	%	No.	%	No.	%
2024	3,355	58.15%	2,340	40.55%	75	1.30%
2018	2,421	57.84%	1,521	36.34%	244	5.83%
2012	2,142	45.83%	2,477	53.00%	55	1.18%
2006	1,481	46.56%	1,599	50.27%	101	3.18%

United States Senate election results for Waterford Township2
Year	Republican		Democratic		Third party(ies)	
Year	No.	%	No.	%	No.	%
2020	3,481	57.13%	2,539	41.67%	73	1.20%
2014	1,428	55.76%	1,101	42.99%	32	1.25%
2013	926	58.98%	627	39.94%	17	1.08%
2008	2,194	44.07%	2,707	54.38%	77	1.55%

== Education ==
The Waterford Township School District serves public school students in pre-kindergarten through sixth grade. As of the 2018–19 school year, the district, comprised of three schools, had an enrollment of 819 students and 78.5 classroom teachers (on an FTE basis), for a student–teacher ratio of 10.4:1. Schools in the district (with 2018–19 enrollment data from the National Center for Education Statistics) are Thomas Richards Early Childhood Center with 221 students in grades 2–3 (now Pre-K–K), Atco Elementary School with 193 students in grades K–1 (now grades 1–2) and Waterford Elementary School with 400 students in grades 4–6.

For seventh through twelfth grades, public school students attend the Hammonton Public Schools in Hammonton as part of a sending/receiving relationship, alongside students from Folsom, who attend for grades 9–12 as part of an agreement with the Folsom Borough School District. In the wake of the dissolution of the Lower Camden County Regional School District, the Hammonton board of education voted in 1999 to begin accepting an estimated 800 students from Waterford Township for grades 7–12 starting as soon as 2002, with the tuition paid by students from Waterford helping to lower overall costs to Hammonton taxpayers and the New Jersey Department of Education approved the agreement. Schools in the Hammonton district attended by Waterford Township students (with 2018–19 enrollment data from the National Center for Education Statistics) are Hammonton Middle School with 879 students in grades 6–8 and Hammonton High School with 1,393 students in grade 9–12.

Assumption School, located in Atco, was an elementary school that operated under the auspices of the Roman Catholic Diocese of Camden, which closed the school at the end of the 2012–2013 school year in the wake of declining enrollment, though parents and contributors argued that they had raised the funds and met the attendance criteria needed to keep the school operating.

== Transportation ==
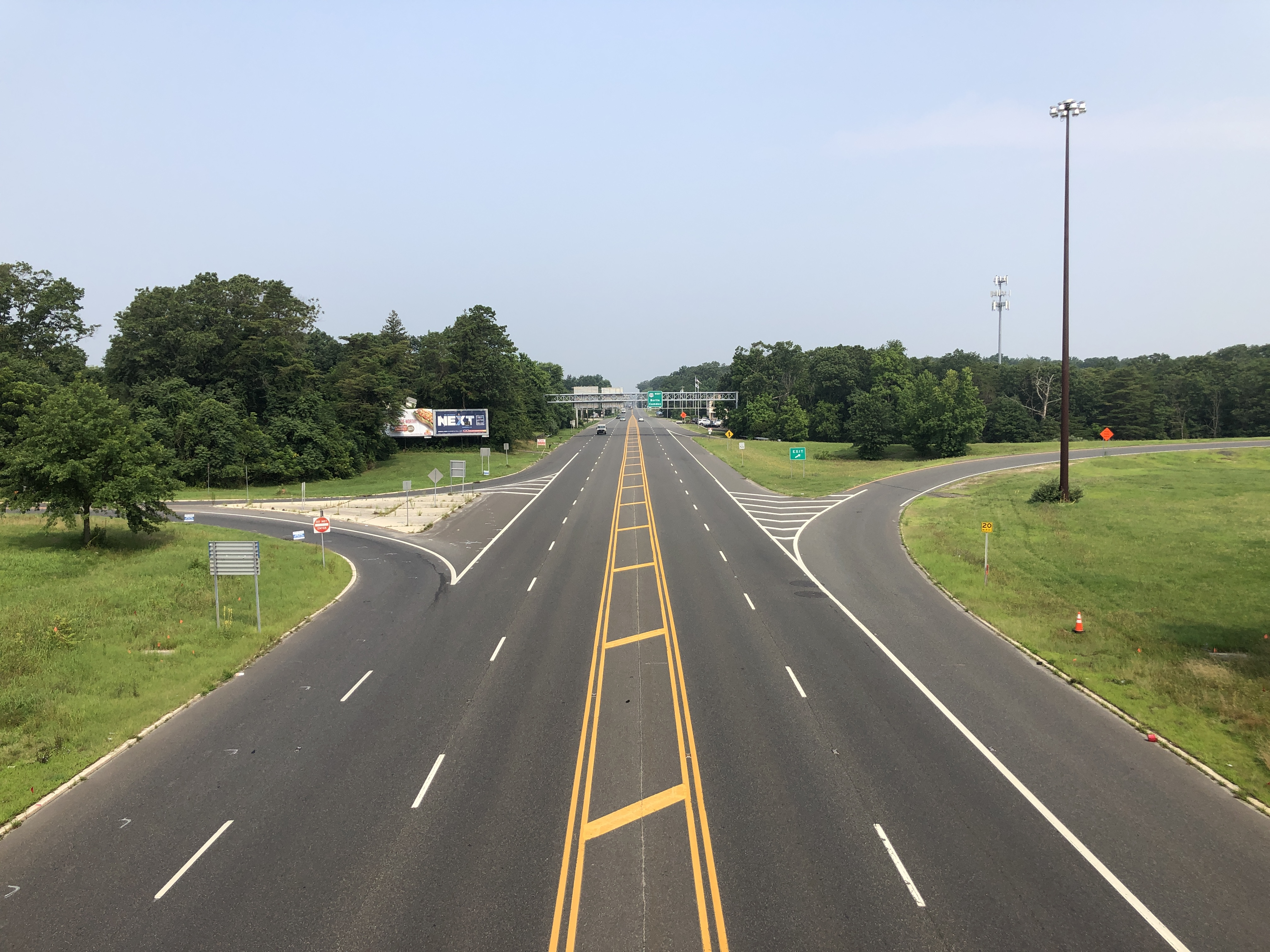
U.S. Route 30 westbound at Route 73 in Waterford Township

=== Roads and highways ===
As of May 2010, the township had a total of 87.48 miles (140.79 km) of roadways, of which 61.64 miles (99.20 km) were maintained by the municipality, 21.86 miles (35.18 km) by Camden County and 3.98 miles (6.41 km) by the New Jersey Department of Transportation.

U.S. Route 30 (White Horse Pike) enters from Berlin borough and continues for 3.3 miles (5.3 km) into Chesilhurst. while Route 73 runs for a short distance along the township's western border, entering from Winslow Township and exiting into Berlin borough. U.S. 30 and NJ 73 intersect on the west side of the township.

County Route 534 (Jackson Road) enters from Berlin Township on the west near the Atco station and continues for almost 8 miles (13 km) across the township's northern border, into Shamong Township in Burlington County. County Route 536 (New Brooklyn / Cedarbrook Road / Pump Branch Road / Pennington Avenue) runs for 5.6 miles (9.0 km) from Monroe Township in Gloucester County into Waterford Township.

The closest limited access road is the Atlantic City Expressway in neighboring Winslow Township. Interstate 295 and the New Jersey Turnpike are two towns away.

=== Public transportation ===
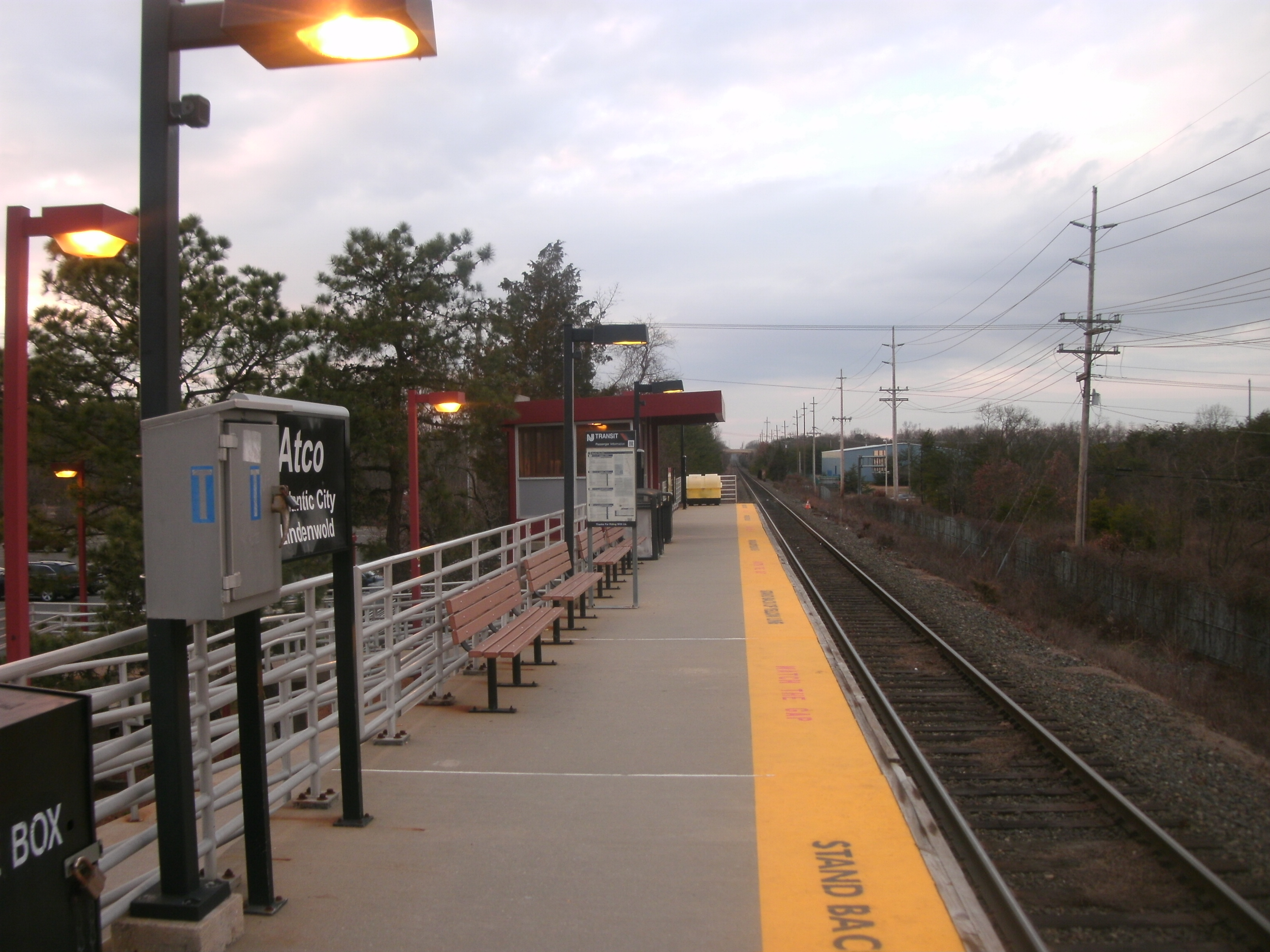
Atco station, which is served by NJ Transit's Atlantic City Line

The Atco station provides NJ Transit train service to the 30th Street Station in Philadelphia and the Atlantic City Rail Terminal in Atlantic City on the Atlantic City Line.

NJ Transit local bus service is available on the 554 route from Lindenwold to Atlantic City and on the 459 route.

== Notable people ==
People who were born in, residents of, or otherwise closely associated with Waterford Township include:

- Marvin Borowsky (1907-1969), novelist and screenwriter
- Kellyanne Conway (born 1967), strategist and pollster who was campaign manager for Republican presidential candidate Donald Trump in 2016
- Rey Ramsey, social justice entrepreneur
- Jimmy Snuka (1943–2017), semi-retired professional wrestler and actor
- Sally Starr (1923–2013), 1950s celebrity television personality
- John Wesley Wescott (1849–1927), lawyer and jurist who served as New Jersey Attorney General from 1914 to 1919
