= Hammonton, New Jersey =

Town in Atlantic County, New Jersey, US

- Town
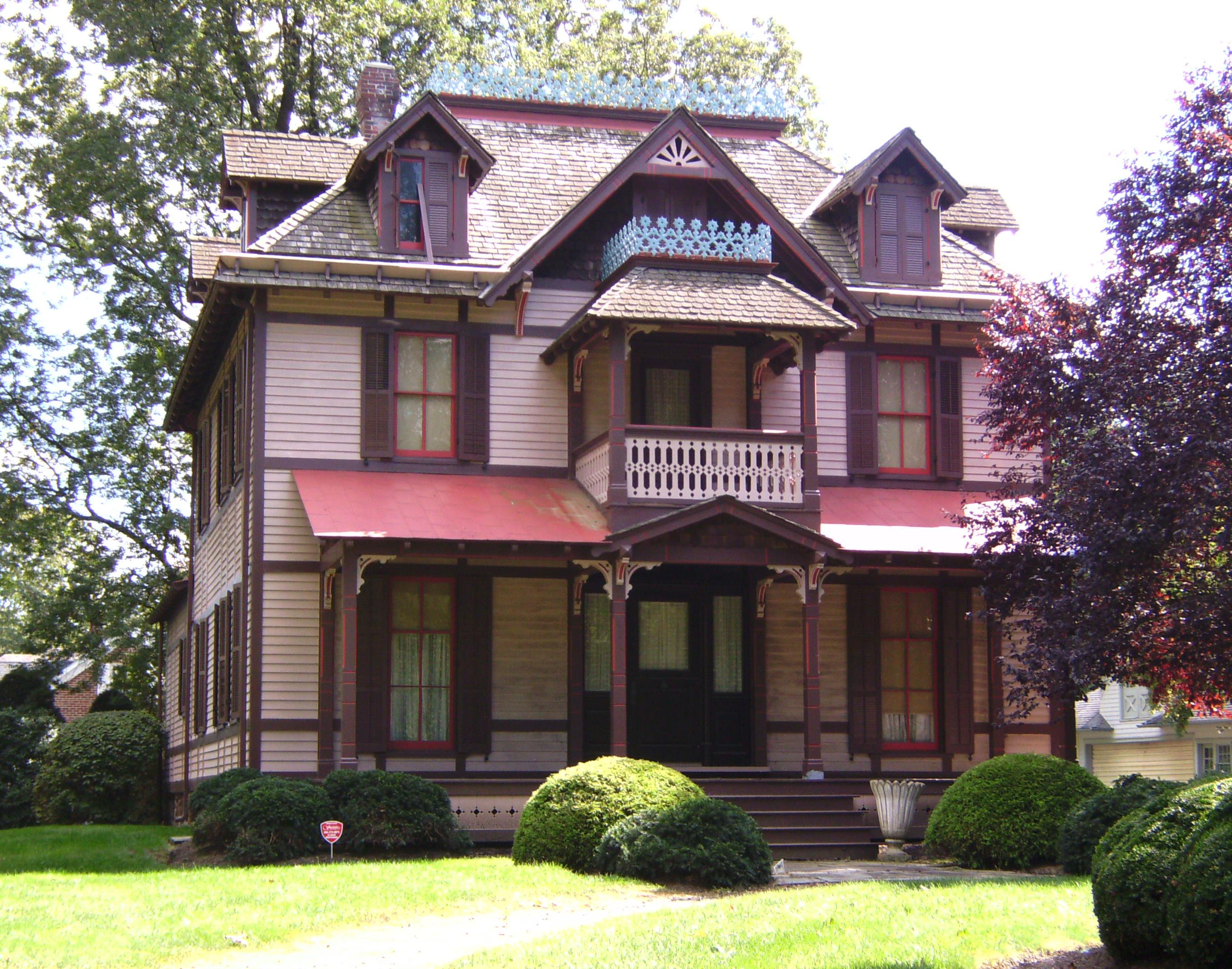
- William L. Black House

- logo
- Nickname: "Blueberry Capital of the World"
- Location of Hammonton in Atlantic County highlighted in red (left). Inset map: Location of Atlantic County in New Jersey highlighted in orange (right).

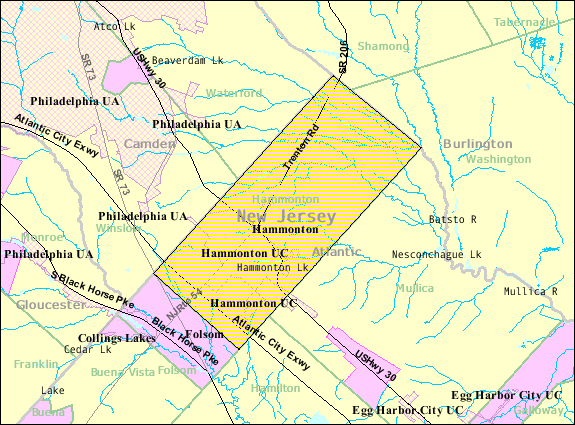
- Census Bureau map of Hammonton, New Jersey

- Location in Atlantic County Location in New Jersey Location in the United States
- Coordinates: 39.66078°N 74.767021°W
- Country: United States
- State: New Jersey
- County: Atlantic
- Incorporated: March 5, 1866
- Named for: John Hammond Coffin

Government
  - Type: Town
  - Body: Town Council
  - Mayor: Steven Furgione (R, term ends December 31, 2029)
  - Business administrator: Frank Zuber
  - Municipal clerk: Frank Zuber

Area
  - Total: 41.32 sq mi (107.01 km^{2})
  - Land: 40.75 sq mi (105.54 km^{2})
  - Water: 0.56 sq mi (1.46 km^{2}) 1.37%
  - Rank: 50th of 565 in state 7th of 23 in county
- Elevation: 62 ft (19 m)

Population (2020)
  - Total: 14,711
  - Estimate (2023): 14,797
  - Rank: 179th of 565 in state 6th of 23 in county
  - Density: 361/sq mi (139/km^{2})
  - Rank: 464th of 565 in state 15th of 23 in county
- Time zone: UTC−05:00 (Eastern (EST))
  - Summer (DST): UTC−04:00 (Eastern (EDT))
- ZIP Code: 08037
- Area code: 609
- FIPS code: 3400129430
- GNIS feature ID: 0885242
- Website: www.townofhammonton.org

Hammonton is a town in Atlantic County, in the U.S. state of New Jersey, that has been referred to as the "Blueberry Capital of the World". As of the 2020 United States census, the town's population was 14,711, a decrease of 80 (−0.5%) from the 2010 census count of 14,791, which in turn reflected an increase of 2,187 (+17.4%) from the 12,604 counted in the 2000 census. Geographically, the town, and all of Atlantic County, is part of the South Jersey region of the state and of the Atlantic City-Hammonton metropolitan statistical area, which in turn is included in the Philadelphia metropolitan area.

The first European settlement of Hammonton was in 1812. It was named for John Hammond Coffin, a son of one of the community's earliest settlers, William Coffin, with the "d" in what was originally Hammondton disappearing over time. It was incorporated as a town by an act of the New Jersey Legislature on March 5, 1866, from portions of Hamilton Township and Mullica Township.

The town is located directly between Philadelphia and the resort town of Atlantic City, along a former route of the Pennsylvania Railroad with Hammonton station directly in the downtown area. The route is now used by NJ Transit's Atlantic City Line.

== History ==
Little is known about the area of Hammonton prior to European contact. Archaeological evidence, including stone tools likely dating back to the Woodland period, suggests some form of prehistoric habitation, though the details remain unclear. At the time of European contact, the region was inhabited by the Unalachtigo Lenape people.

As European settlement progressed, the Lenape population in the area declined due to disease, loss of land to European settlers, and emigration. In 1748, the West Jersey Society was granted rights over a large tract of land within the English Province of New Jersey, which included the territory that would later become Hammonton. In 1805, the Society sold a parcel of what would eventually become Hammonton, with the land passing through several owners.

In 1812, William Coffin and his family migrated to the area, building a home and managing a sawmill for John R. Coates. Coffin purchased the land and the mill in 1814. The sawmill was situated adjacent to Hammonton Lake and extended north and east of the present-day town, rather than being located within the current downtown. Originally named "Hammondton" after Coffin's son, John Hammond Coffin, the name was later simplified to Hammonton.

In 1817, Coffin established a glass factory in the area, taking advantage of the abundance of cheap timber and bog iron that supported South Jersey's glass industry at the time. Finished products were transported via the Mullica River before the advent of railroads, with trading stores and workers' housing established nearby.

The early settlement of Old Hammonton was small and experienced a shift from glass production to farming, particularly the cultivation of strawberries and blueberries. The arrival of the Camden and Atlantic Railroad in 1854, which ran to the west of Old Hammonton, prompted further development. In 1856, developer Charles K. Landis and Philadelphia banker Richard Byrnes formed Landis & Byrnes, acquiring large plots of land near the newly constructed railroad. They promoted and sold smaller parcels for development, moving the settlement closer to the railway. The Hammonton Railroad Station was established in 1858.

In 1861, Landis and Byrnes had a falling-out; Byrnes remained in Hammonton, while Landis went on to establish Vineland and Sea Isle City. In 1866, Hammonton's leaders petitioned the New Jersey Legislature to separate from Mullica Township and Hamilton Township, and Hammonton was officially incorporated as a town on March 5, 1866. At the time of incorporation, the population was recorded as 1,422.

A significant development in Hammonton's history following incorporation was a wave of Italian immigration. Salvador Calabrasce, an Italian immigrant and former Union Navy serviceman, moved to Hammonton after marrying a New Jersey native. He corresponded with friends in Gesso, Sicily, which attracted more immigrants to Hammonton. Through the efforts of Calabrasce and others, the town saw a growing population of Italian-Americans, who would eventually make up a substantial portion of the town's overall population.

Hammonton briefly featured a major racing track, the Atlantic City Speedway. Races were held from 1926 to 1928 on the wooden track that was built, complete with a direct rail connection. The owners had hoped to compete with the major racetracks of the era, but were unable to continue. The track served as a test track for Studebaker from 1928 to 1933 before it was demolished, and the timber used in its construction was repurposed for other buildings.

The first Hammonton Blueberry Festival was held in 1953, embracing the area's identity as a major producer of blueberries.

== Geography ==
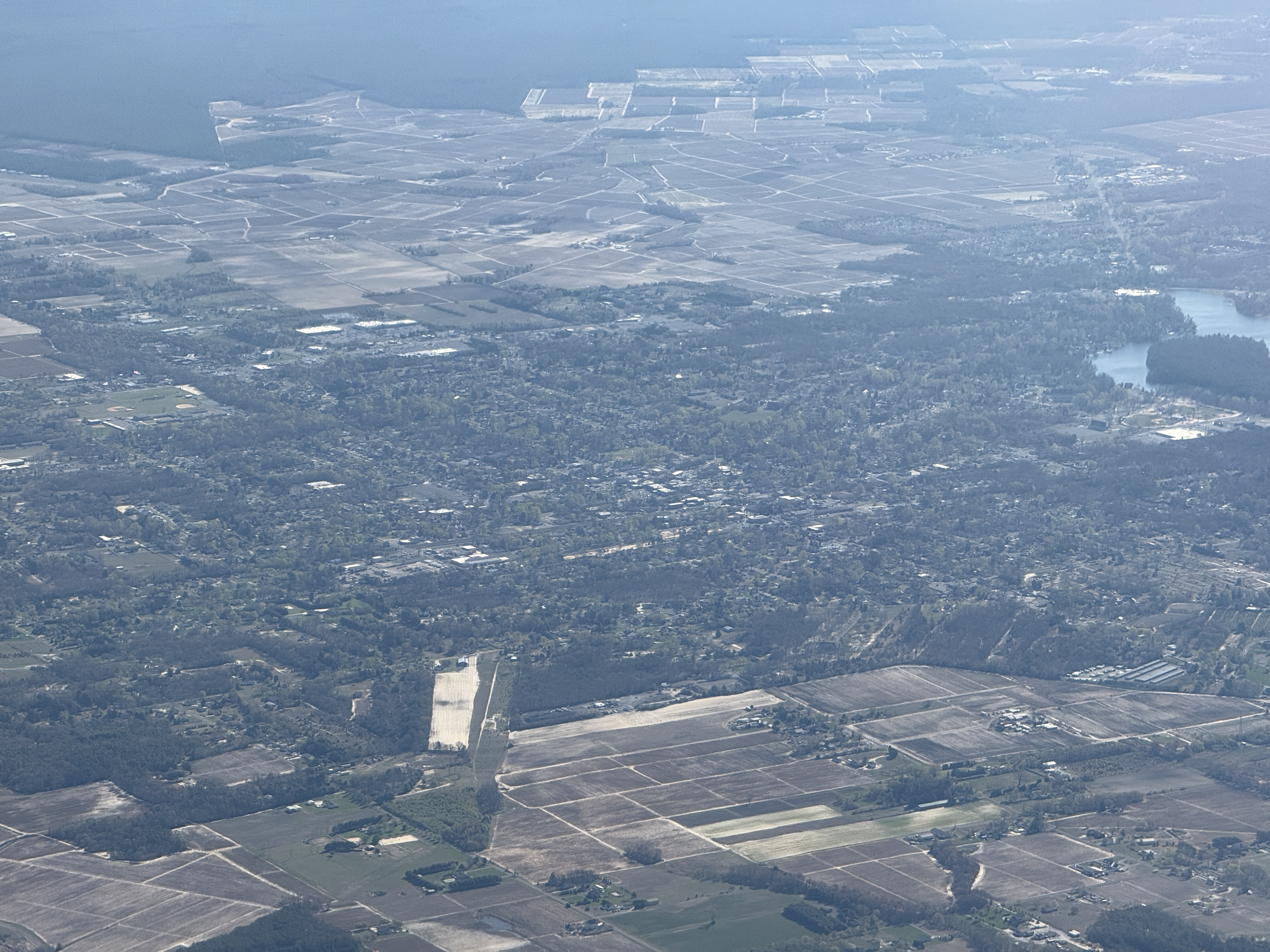
Aerial view of Hammonton

According to the U.S. Census Bureau, Hammonton had a total area of 41.32 square miles (107.01 km^{2}), including 40.75 square miles (105.54 km^{2}) of land and 0.57 square miles (1.46 km^{2}) of water (1.37%).

The town borders Folsom borough, to the southwest, and both Hamilton and Mullica townships to the southeast in Atlantic County; Shamong Township and Washington Township in Burlington County to the northeast; and Waterford Township and Winslow Township in Camden County to the northwest. It is located in the Atlantic Coastal Plain, so is largely flat, though the highest point in Atlantic County is located along the Pennsylvania Railroad within the borders of Hammonton. The town is located almost exactly halfway between Philadelphia and Atlantic City.

Unincorporated communities, localities and place names located completely or partially within the town include Barnard, Bellhurst, Caldwell Crossing, Dacosta, Dutchtown, Great Swamp, Murphy, Rockford, Rockwood, Rosedale and West Mills.

=== Pine Barrens ===
The town is one of 56 South Jersey municipalities that are included within the New Jersey Pinelands National Reserve, a protected natural area of unique ecology covering 1,100,000 acres (450,000 ha), that has been classified as a United States Biosphere Reserve and established by Congress in 1978 as the nation's first National Reserve. All of the town is included in the state-designated Pinelands Area, which includes portions of Atlantic County, along with areas in Burlington, Camden, Cape May, Cumberland, Gloucester and Ocean counties.

Due to its location in the Pine Barrens, the soil is largely sandy, making it ideal for growing blueberries. Low, marshy areas, often within the Pine Barrens are also used for cranberry cultivation.

On June 19, 2022, a fire broke out in the Wharton State Forest in a remote area in the northern part of Hammonton. The Mullica River Fire consumed more than 15,000 acres of protected land and became the largest wildfire in the state in 15 years. The cause of the fire is believed to be caused by an illegal campfire.

=== Climate ===
Hammonton lies in the northern reaches of the humid subtropical climate zone, and, similar to inland southern New Jersey, is characterized by brisk winters, hot summers, and plentiful precipitation spread evenly throughout the year. According to the Köppen Climate Classification system, Hammonton's climate is abbreviated "Cfa" on climate maps.

Climate data for Hammonton, New Jersey (1991–2020 normals, extremes 1930–present)
Month	Jan	Feb	Mar	Apr	May	Jun	Jul	Aug	Sep	Oct	Nov	Dec	Year
Record high °F (°C)	76 (24)	77 (25)	90 (32)	95 (35)	98 (37)	103 (39)	105 (41)	104 (40)	102 (39)	95 (35)	86 (30)	77 (25)	105 (41)
Mean daily maximum °F (°C)	41.8 (5.4)	44.7 (7.1)	52.0 (11.1)	63.7 (17.6)	73.2 (22.9)	82.3 (27.9)	87.3 (30.7)	85.1 (29.5)	78.7 (25.9)	67.4 (19.7)	56.4 (13.6)	47.0 (8.3)	65.0 (18.3)
Daily mean °F (°C)	32.8 (0.4)	34.9 (1.6)	41.5 (5.3)	52.3 (11.3)	62.1 (16.7)	71.6 (22.0)	76.9 (24.9)	74.8 (23.8)	68.0 (20.0)	56.3 (13.5)	45.9 (7.7)	37.7 (3.2)	54.6 (12.6)
Mean daily minimum °F (°C)	23.9 (−4.5)	25.0 (−3.9)	31.1 (−0.5)	41.0 (5.0)	51.0 (10.6)	61.0 (16.1)	66.5 (19.2)	64.4 (18.0)	57.2 (14.0)	45.3 (7.4)	35.3 (1.8)	28.5 (−1.9)	44.2 (6.8)
Record low °F (°C)	−13 (−25)	−8 (−22)	4 (−16)	15 (−9)	29 (−2)	34 (1)	43 (6)	42 (6)	31 (−1)	19 (−7)	6 (−14)	−5 (−21)	−13 (−25)
Average precipitation inches (mm)	3.49 (89)	2.85 (72)	4.31 (109)	3.71 (94)	3.54 (90)	4.07 (103)	4.45 (113)	4.69 (119)	4.06 (103)	4.27 (108)	3.51 (89)	4.56 (116)	47.51 (1,207)
Average snowfall inches (cm)	5.7 (14)	6.4 (16)	2.9 (7.4)	0.1 (0.25)	0.0 (0.0)	0.0 (0.0)	0.0 (0.0)	0.0 (0.0)	0.0 (0.0)	0.0 (0.0)	0.2 (0.51)	3.7 (9.4)	19.0 (48)
Average precipitation days (≥ 0.01 in)	11.1	10.1	10.9	11.9	12.3	12.3	11.9	10.6	9.5	11.6	9.2	10.8	132.2
Average snowy days (≥ 0.1 in)	2.9	2.8	1.5	0.2	0.0	0.0	0.0	0.0	0.0	0.0	0.1	1.4	8.9
Source: NOAA

== Demographics ==
Historical population
Census	Pop.	Note	%±
1870	1,404		—
1880	1,776		26.5%
1890	3,833		115.8%
1900	3,481		−9.2%
1910	5,088		46.2%
1920	6,417		26.1%
1930	7,656		19.3%
1940	7,668		0.2%
1950	8,411		9.7%
1960	9,854		17.2%
1970	11,464		16.3%
1980	12,298		7.3%
1990	12,208		−0.7%
2000	12,604		3.2%
2010	14,791		17.4%
2020	14,711		−0.5%
2023 (est.)	14,797	▲	0.6%
Population sources: 1870–2000; 1870–1920 1870 1880–1890; 1890–1910 1910–1930; 1940–2000 2000; 2010 2020

=== 2020 census ===
As of the 2020 census, Hammonton had a population of 14,711. The median age was 41.4 years. 22.0% of residents were under the age of 18 and 18.7% of residents were 65 years of age or older. For every 100 females there were 96.3 males, and for every 100 females age 18 and over there were 93.3 males age 18 and over.

81.4% of residents lived in urban areas, while 18.6% lived in rural areas.

There were 5,456 households in Hammonton, of which 31.8% had children under the age of 18 living in them. Of all households, 47.4% were married-couple households, 17.2% were households with a male householder and no spouse or partner present, and 28.0% were households with a female householder and no spouse or partner present. About 25.5% of all households were made up of individuals and 13.3% had someone living alone who was 65 years of age or older.

There were 5,804 housing units, of which 6.0% were vacant. The homeowner vacancy rate was 1.0% and the rental vacancy rate was 5.7%.

Racial composition as of the 2020 census
Race	Number	Percent
White	10,701	72.7%
Black or African American	443	3.0%
American Indian and Alaska Native	96	0.7%
Asian	158	1.1%
Native Hawaiian and Other Pacific Islander	8	0.1%
Some other race	1,741	11.8%
Two or more races	1,564	10.6%
Hispanic or Latino (of any race)	3,517	23.9%

=== 2010 census ===
The 2010 United States census counted 14,791 people, 5,408 households, and 3,759 families in the town. The population density was 361.8 per square mile (139.7/km^{2}). There were 5,715 housing units at an average density of 139.8 per square mile (54.0/km^{2}). The racial makeup was 81.67% (12,080) White, 3.00% (444) Black or African American, 0.28% (42) Native American, 1.37% (203) Asian, 0.01% (2) Pacific Islander, 10.81% (1,599) from other races, and 2.85% (421) from two or more races. Hispanic or Latino of any race were 20.93% (3,096) of the population.

Of the 5,408 households, 31.9% had children under the age of 18; 51.5% were married couples living together; 12.5% had a female householder with no husband present and 30.5% were non-families. Of all households, 25.0% were made up of individuals and 12.6% had someone living alone who was 65 years of age or older. The average household size was 2.68 and the average family size was 3.19.

23.4% of the population were under the age of 18, 8.2% from 18 to 24, 26.4% from 25 to 44, 26.1% from 45 to 64, and 16.0% who were 65 years of age or older. The median age was 39.6 years. For every 100 females, the population had 99.0 males. For every 100 females ages 18 and older there were 95.2 males.

The Census Bureau's 2006–2010 American Community Survey showed that (in 2010 inflation-adjusted dollars) median household income was $59,085 (with a margin of error of +/− $3,242) and the median family income was $62,354 (+/− $3,893). Males had a median income of $47,110 (+/− $4,411) versus $36,615 (+/− $3,549) for females. The per capita income for the borough was $25,292 (+/− $1,528). About 8.4% of families and 10.2% of the population were below the poverty line, including 13.1% of those under age 18 and 9.2% of those age 65 or over.

=== 2000 census ===
As of the 2000 United States census there were 12,604 people, 4,619 households, and 3,270 families residing in the town. The population density was 305.5 inhabitants per square mile (118.0/km^{2}). There were 4,843 housing units at an average density of 117.4 per square mile (45.3/km^{2}). The racial makeup of the town was 87.85% White, 1.74% African American, 0.14% Native American, 1.14% Asian, 0.02% Pacific Islander, 7.83% from other races, and 1.27% from two or more races. Hispanic or Latino of any race were 14.88% of the population.

As of the 2000 Census, 45.9% of town residents were of Italian ancestry, the second-highest percentage of any municipality in the United States (behind Johnston, Rhode Island, at 46.7%), and highest in New Jersey, among all places with more than 1,000 residents identifying their ancestry. News reports have said Hammonton leads the nation in Italian-Americans per capita.

There were 4,619 households, out of which 30.2% had children under the age of 18 living with them, 54.6% were married couples living together, 11.2% had a female householder with no husband present, and 29.2% were non-families. 23.9% of all households were made up of individuals, and 12.5% had someone living alone who was 65 years of age or older. The average household size was 2.65 and the average family size was 3.14.

In the town, the population was spread out, with 22.8% under the age of 18, 7.9% from 18 to 24, 29.2% from 25 to 44, 22.1% from 45 to 64, and 18.0% who were 65 years of age or older. The median age was 39 years. For every 100 females, there were 93.9 males. For every 100 females age 18 and over, there were 92.7 males.

The median income for a household in the town was $43,137, and the median income for a family was $52,205. Males had a median income of $36,219 versus $27,900 for females. The per capita income for the town was $19,889. About 5.7% of families and 9.1% of the population were below the poverty line, including 9.0% of those under age 18 and 10.8% of those age 65 or over.

== Arts and culture ==
Musical groups from the town include the rock band The Early November.

== Sports ==
In 1997, Gabriel Donio (founder and publisher of The Hammonton Gazette) proposed a minor-league baseball team called the Hammonton Blueberries, going so far as to create a team logo and a prototype uniform, as well as purchasing a 20-acre tract of land for $200,000. Donio planned to build on the site a 3,500-seat, six-million-dollar ballpark, which he described as "a rough miniature of the Brooklyn Dodgers' Ebbets Field". In 1999, the Northern League announced that they would form a six-team developmental circuit and include Hammonton as one of the clubs; however, this did not happen, and the proposed ballpark was not built, putting an end to the Blueberries. (Since Hammonton is less than 75 miles from Philadelphia, any pro baseball team there would either need permission from the Phillies or play in an independent league, outside of MLB's jurisdiction.)

== Government ==
=== Local government ===
Hammonton is governed under the Town form of New Jersey municipal government. The town is one of nine municipalities (of the 564) statewide that use this traditional form of government. The governing body is comprised of the Mayor and the Town Council, with all positions elected at-large on a partisan basis as part of the November general election. The Mayor is elected to a four-year term. The Town Council includes six members elected to serve two-year terms on a staggered basis, with three seats coming up for election each year.

As of 2026, the Mayor of Hammonton is Republican Steve Furgione, whose term of office ends December 31, 2029. Members of the Hammonton Town Council are Deputy Mayor Sam Rodio (I, 2026), J.D. Calderone (R, 2027), Anthony Marino (R, 2027), James Matro (I, 2026), Renee Rodio (R, 2026), and Ray Scipione (R, 2027).

Previous mayor Steve DiDonato and many council members, including current deputy mayor Sam Rodio, are affiliated with Hammonton First, an independent third-party political organization that was established in 2005.

=== Federal, state and county representation ===
Hammonton is located in the 2nd Congressional District and is part of New Jersey's 8th state legislative district.

For the 119th United States Congress, New Jersey's 2nd congressional district is represented by Jeff Van Drew (R, Dennis Township). New Jersey is represented in the United States Senate by Democrats Cory Booker (Newark, term ends 2027) and Andy Kim (Moorestown, term ends 2031).

For the 2026–2027 session, the 8th legislative district of the New Jersey Legislature is represented in the New Jersey Senate by Latham Tiver (R, Southampton Township) and in the General Assembly by Anthony Angelozzi (D, Hammonton) and Andrea Katz (D, Chesterfield Township).

Atlantic County is governed by a directly elected county executive and a nine-member Board of County Commissioners, responsible for legislation. The executive serves a four-year term and the commissioners are elected to staggered three-year terms, of which four are elected from the county on an at-large basis and five of the commissioners represent equally populated districts. As of 2025, Atlantic County's Executive is Dennis Levinson (R, Northfield), whose term of office ends December 31, 2027. Members of the Board of County Commissioners are:

Ernest D. Coursey (D, District 1-- Atlantic City, Egg Harbor Township (part), Longport, Margate City, and Ventnor City; 2025, Atlantic City), Chair Maureen Kern (R, District 2-- Egg Harbor Township (part), Linwood, Northfield, Somers Point and Pleasantville; 2027, Somers Point), Andrew Parker III (R, District 3-- Egg Harbor Township (part) and Hamilton Township (part); 2026, Egg Harbor Township), Richard R. Dase (R, District 4, including Brigantine, Galloway Township, Egg Harbor Township (part), and Port Republic; 2025, Galloway Township), Vice Chair James A. Bertino (R, District 5-- Buena, Buena Vista Township, Corbin City, Egg Harbor City, Estell Manor, Folsom, Hamilton Township (part), Hammonton, Mullica Township and Weymouth Township; 2027, Hammonton), June Byrnes (R, At-Large; 2026, Linwood), Michael Ruffu (R, At-Large; Margate, 2027) Amy L. Gatto (R, At-large; 2025, Hamilton Township) and John W. Risley (R, At-Large; 2026, Egg Harbor Township)

Atlantic County's constitutional officers are: Clerk Joesph J. Giralo (R, 2026, Hammonton), Sheriff Joe O'Donoghue (R, 2026, Egg Harbor Township) and Surrogate James Curcio (R, 2025, Hammonton).

=== Politics ===
As of March 2011, there were a total of 8,556 registered voters in Hammonton, of which 1,851 (21.6% vs. 30.5% countywide) were registered as Democrats, 2,627 (30.7% vs. 25.2%) were registered as Republicans and 4,076 (47.6% vs. 44.3%) were registered as unaffiliated. There were 2 voters registered as Libertarians or Greens. Among the town's 2010 Census population, 57.8% (vs. 58.8% in Atlantic County) were registered to vote, including 75.5% of those ages 18 and over (vs. 76.6% countywide).

Gubernatorial election results for Hammonton
Year	Republican		Democratic		Third party(ies)	
Year	No.	%	No.	%	No.	%
2025	3,775	61.99%	2,275	37.36%	40	0.66%
2021	3,444	67.82%	1,580	31.11%	54	1.06%
2017	2,425	56.34%	1,729	40.17%	150	3.49%
2013	3,234	71.50%	1,229	27.17%	60	1.33%
2009	2,588	55.56%	1,773	38.06%	297	6.38%
2005	2,366	43.15%	2,881	52.54%	236	4.30%

In the 2016 presidential election, Republican Donald Trump received 3,859 votes (60.08% vs 44.64% countywide), ahead of Democrat Hillary Clinton with 2,366 votes (36.84% vs 51.61%) and other candidates with 198 votes (3.08% vs 3.76%). A total of 6,423 ballots were cast. In the 2012 presidential election, Republican Mitt Romney received 3,420 votes here (54.4% vs. 41.1% countywide), ahead of Democrat Barack Obama with 2,777 votes (44.1% vs. 57.9%) and other candidates with 57 votes (0.9% vs. 0.9%), among the 6,290 ballots cast by the town's 8,951 registered voters, for a turnout of 70.3% (vs. 65.8% in Atlantic County). In the 2008 presidential election, Republican John McCain received 3,509 votes here (54.0% vs. 41.6% countywide), ahead of Democrat Barack Obama with 2,894 votes (44.5% vs. 56.5%) and other candidates with 89 votes (1.4% vs. 1.1%), among the 6,502 ballots cast by the town's 9,090 registered voters, for a turnout of 71.5% (vs. 68.1% in Atlantic County). In the 2004 presidential election, Republican George W. Bush received 3,218 votes here (54.1% vs. 46.2% countywide), ahead of Democrat John Kerry with 2,600 votes (43.7% vs. 52.0%) and other candidates with 47 votes (0.8% vs. 0.8%), among the 5,947 ballots cast by the town's 7,913 registered voters, for a turnout of 75.2% (vs. 69.8% in the whole county).

Presidential elections results
Year	Republican	Democratic	Third Parties
2024	63.3% 4,697	35.1% 2,609	1.6% 96
2020	59.9% 4,560	38.9% 2,957	1.2% 94
2016	60.1% 3,859	36.8% 2,366	3.1% 198
2012	54.4% 3,420	44.1% 2,777	0.9% 57
2008	54.0% 3,509	44.5% 2,894	1.4% 89
2004	54.1% 3,218	43.7% 2,600	0.8% 47

In the 2017 gubernatorial election, Republican Kim Guadagno received 2,425 votes (56.38% vs 42.46% countywide) ahead of Democrat Phillip Murphy with 1,726 votes (40.13% vs 55.14%), and other candidates with 150 votes (3.49% vs 2.41%). There were a total of 4,301 votes cast. In the 2013 gubernatorial election, Republican Chris Christie received 3,234 votes here (68.7% vs. 60.0% countywide), ahead of Democrat Barbara Buono with 1,229 votes (26.1% vs. 34.9%) and other candidates with 60 votes (1.3% vs. 1.3%), among the 4,709 ballots cast by the town's 9,033 registered voters, yielding a 52.1% turnout (vs. 41.5% in the county). In the 2009 gubernatorial election, Republican Chris Christie received 2,588 votes here (53.7% vs. 47.7% countywide), ahead of Democrat Jon Corzine with 1,773 votes (36.8% vs. 44.5%), Independent Chris Daggett with 204 votes (4.2% vs. 4.8%) and other candidates with 93 votes (1.9% vs. 1.2%), among the 4,822 ballots cast by the town's 8,724 registered voters, yielding a 55.3% turnout (vs. 44.9% in the county).

United States Senate election results for Hammonton1
Year	Republican		Democratic		Third party(ies)	
Year	No.	%	No.	%	No.	%
2024	4,226	61.45%	2,533	36.83%	118	1.72%
2018	2,857	62.79%	1,507	33.12%	186	4.09%
2012	2,858	50.21%	2,726	47.89%	108	1.90%
2006	2,323	56.14%	1,715	41.45%	100	2.42%

United States Senate election results for Hammonton2
Year	Republican		Democratic		Third party(ies)	
Year	No.	%	No.	%	No.	%
2020	4,297	58.84%	2,858	39.13%	148	2.03%
2014	2,024	59.41%	1,274	37.39%	109	3.20%
2013	1,152	63.89%	620	34.39%	31	1.72%
2008	2,892	50.05%	2,782	48.15%	104	1.80%

== Education ==
Students in pre-kindergarten through twelfth grade attend the Hammonton Public Schools. As of the 2023–24 school year, the district, comprised of four schools, had an enrollment of 3,326 students and 255.0 classroom teachers (on an FTE basis), for a student–teacher ratio of 13.0:1. Schools in the district (with 2023–24 enrollment data from the National Center for Education Statistics) are Early Childhood Education Center with 387 students in grades PreK–1, Warren E. Sooy Elementary School with 719 students in grades 2–5, Hammonton Middle School with 834 students in grades 6–8 and Hammonton High School with 1,318 students in grades 9–12.

Students from Folsom Borough (grades 9–12) and Waterford Township in Camden County (7–12) attend the Hammonton schools as part of sending/receiving relationships with the Folsom Borough School District and the Waterford Township School District.

In the wake of the dissolution of the Lower Camden County Regional School District, the Hammonton board of education voted in 1999 to begin accepting an estimated 800 students from Waterford Township for grades 7–12 starting as of 2002, with the tuition paid by students from Waterford helping to lower overall costs to Hammonton taxpayers.

Borough public school students are also eligible to attend the Atlantic County Institute of Technology in the Mays Landing section of Hamilton Township or the Charter-Tech High School for the Performing Arts, located in Somers Point.

Hammonton was home of the Catholic schools St. Joseph Regional Elementary School (for Pre-K–8) and St. Joseph High School (for grades 9–12) which operated under the jurisdiction of the Diocese of Camden. In April 2020, the Diocese of Camden announced that despite its status as a football powerhouse, St. Joseph was one of five Catholic schools in New Jersey which would close permanently at the end of the school year on June 30, 2020. St. Joseph Regional Elementary was to permanently close at the end of the school year as well. St. Joseph High School reopened in September 2020 as the independent St. Joseph Academy, which operates separately from the Camden Diocese and leases the building from the Hammonton Public Schools, which had acquired the building.

== Media ==
=== Television stations ===
- WPSJ-CD Channel 8 Hammonton (Independent)

=== Newspapers ===
- Hammonton Gazette
- Hammonton News

Hammonton is served by other newspapers:

- The Press of Atlantic City a major daily newspaper in South New Jersey.
- Philadelphia Daily News a major daily newspaper based in Philadelphia.
- The Philadelphia Inquirer a major daily newspaper based in Philadelphia.

== Transportation ==
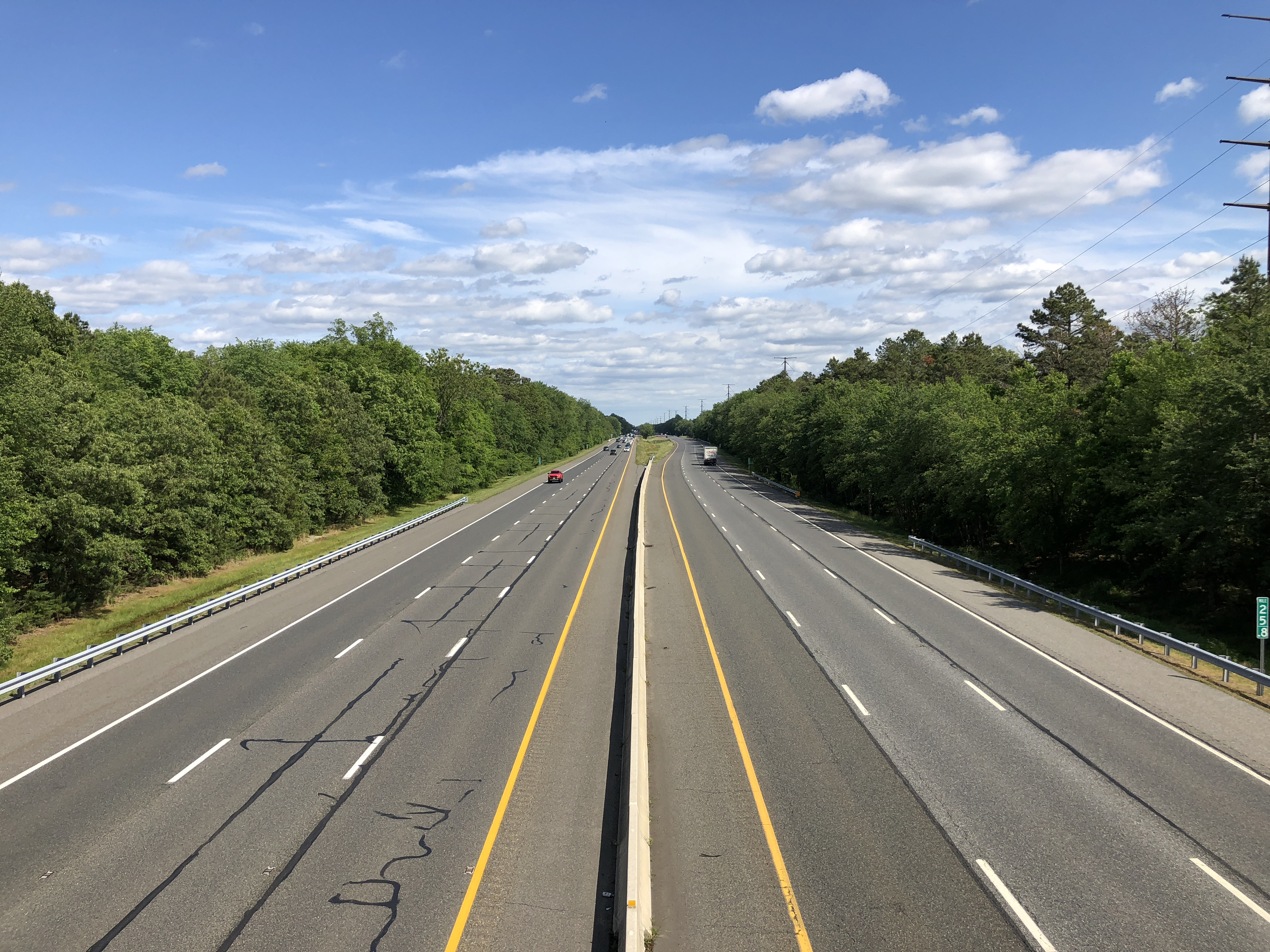
The eastbound Atlantic City Expressway in Hammonton

=== Roads and highways ===
As of 2010, the town had a total of 126.50 miles (203.58 km) of roadways, of which 77.04 miles (123.98 km) were maintained by the municipality, 30.61 miles (49.26 km) by Atlantic County and 14.65 miles (23.58 km) by the New Jersey Department of Transportation and 4.20 miles (6.76 km) by the South Jersey Transportation Authority.

The Atlantic City Expressway, U.S. Route 30, U.S. Route 206 and Route 54 all pass through Hammonton, as do County Route 536, County Route 542, County Route 559 and County Route 561.

=== Public transportation ===
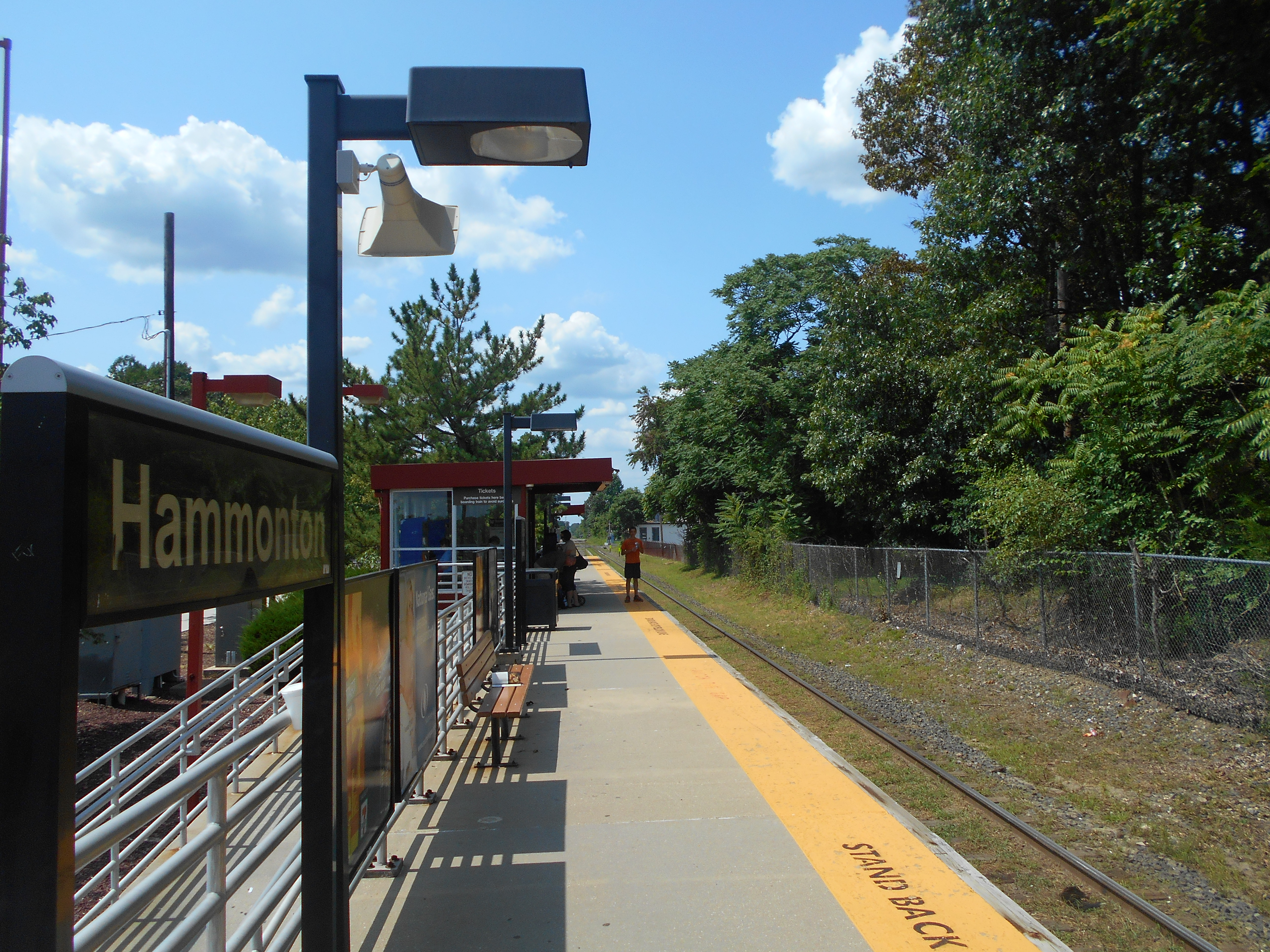
Hammonton station, which is served by NJ Transit's Atlantic City Line

The Hammonton station of NJ Transit provides passenger rail service between the Atlantic City Rail Terminal in Atlantic City and 30th Street Station in Philadelphia and intermediate points on the Atlantic City Line.

NJ Transit provides bus service in Hammonton on the 554 route between Lindenwold station and Atlantic City.

=== Airport ===
Hammonton Municipal Airport is located 3 miles (4.8 km) northeast of the central business district.

== Community ==
=== Blueberry capital ===
Hammonton is known as the "Blueberry Capital of the World".

Since the 1987, the Red, White and Blueberry Festival has celebrated Hammonton's status as the nation's blueberry capital. A 1,300-acre (530 ha) farm in the town is Northeast's largest blueberry grower and the Hammonton area has over 50 farms that produce over 80% of New Jersey's blueberry crop.

Hammonton and the surrounding Atlantic County produce upwards of 50×10^{6} pounds (2.3×10^{7} kg) of blueberries each year using traveling bands of labor from outside of the United States, though often the farms employing these undocumented workers are largely supportive of stricter border policies.

=== Presidential visits ===
Ronald Reagan visited Hammonton during his 1984 re-election campaign. Reagan's speech highlighted Hammonton's status as "Blueberry Capital of the World" and then extolled the virtues of New Jersey native Bruce Springsteen.

Springsteen soon disassociated himself from the politics and the use of his song "Born in The U.S.A."

Hammonton has also been visited by Ulysses S. Grant and Theodore Roosevelt, who made whistle stops in the town.

=== Festivals ===
Every year Hammonton hosts the Red, White and Blueberry festival, Our Lady of Mount Carmel festival and the Hammonton wine festival. Mount Carmel's Italian Festival dates back to 1875 and is considered the oldest such continuously run festival in the United States. Other festivals include; Hammonton Fall Beer Festival, Teen Arts Festival, Hammonton Food Truck Festival, Hammonton Green Day Festival, and Crusin Main Street.

=== Downtown ===
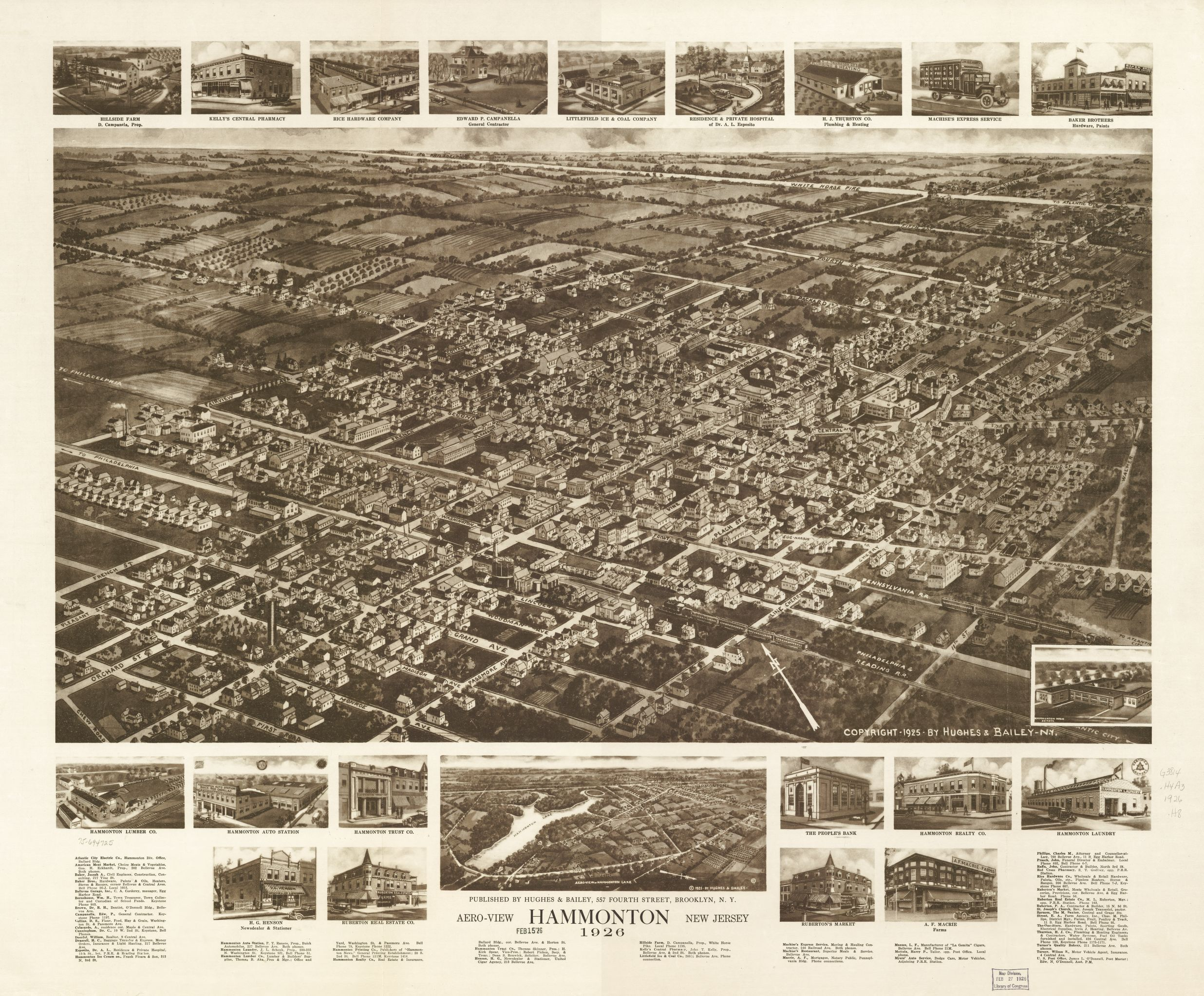
Aerial view of Hammonton, New Jersey (1926)

Hammonton's downtown district has been growing for the past 20 years. The downtown area includes Bellevue Avenue, Central Avenue, Vine street, Second Street, Third Street, Twelfth Street, Egg Harbor Road, Front Street, West End Avenue, Railroad Avenue and Washington Street. The downtown includes art galleries, restaurants, wine and sports bars, banks, clothing stores, offices, a theatre, a park, and a college satellite campus, attracting shoppers from South Jersey.

Every year the downtown has three parades. The Halloween and Christmas parades are the two major parades that happen in downtown. In May, there is a smaller Memorial Day parade. The Downtown also hosts the annual Christmas Tree Lighting, which is a large celebration that includes the lighting of a large tree on the corner of Bellevue and Central Avenue, Christmas carolers, a music show, carriage rides, a live nativity and the arrival of Santa. During these events the downtown stores are open late.

In the past, on the third Thursday of every month, the downtown would host the "Third Thursday Events", with a different theme each month. Stores offered discounts, and people performed on the street. This was discontinued at the end of 2024.

The downtown was one of the finalist for the Great American Main Street Award in 2013. The award recognizes three communities each year for their successful revitalization efforts, based on documented economic impact, small-business development, historic preservation, volunteer involvement, public/private cooperation and success over time.

=== Events ===
In 1949, Hammonton was the winner of the Little League World Series, after finishing third in the tournament in both 1947 and 1948. The Hammonton team was the first official team located outside of Pennsylvania.

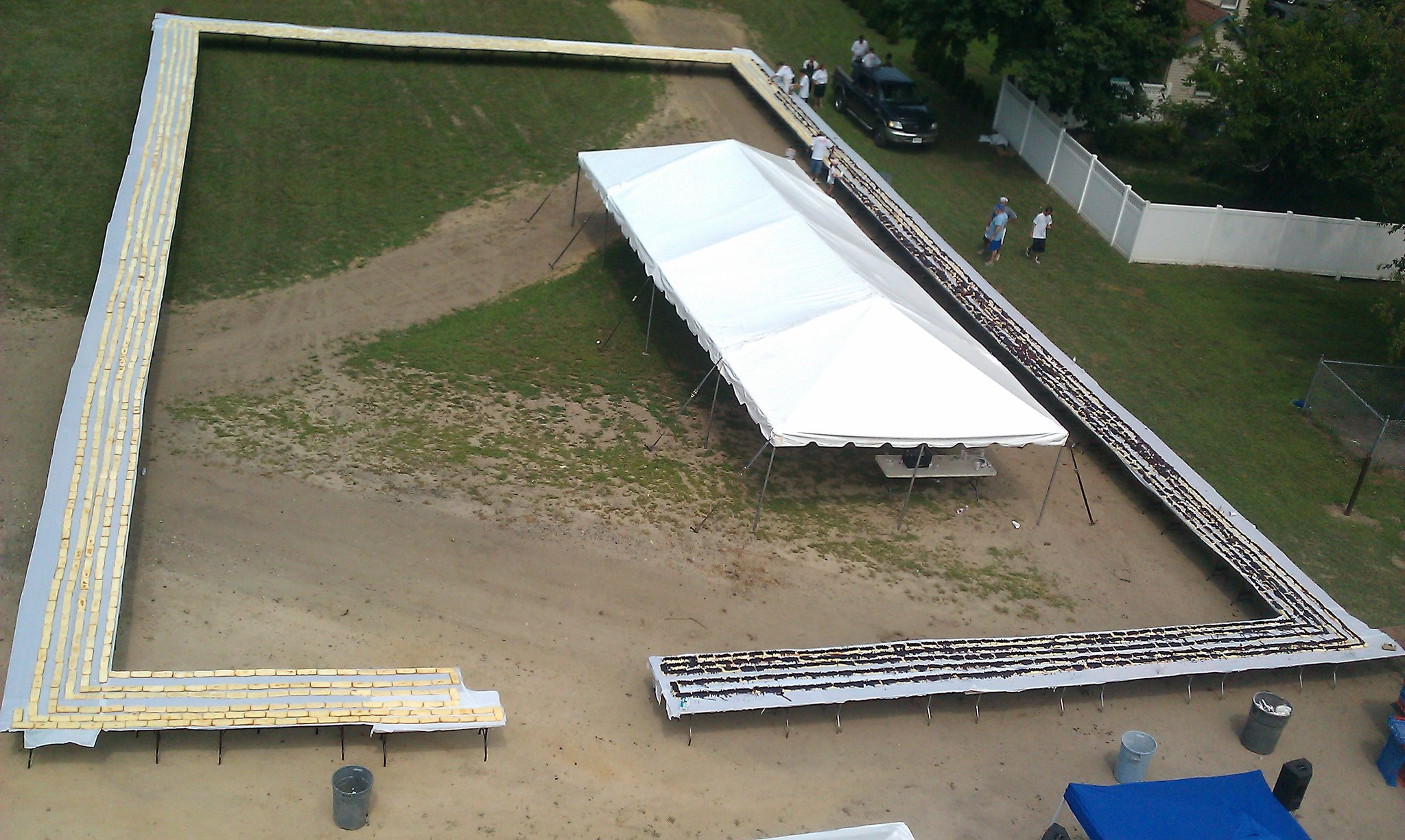
Longest Line of Cakes Guinness Record in Hammonton New Jersey

On July 24, 2011, Ricca's Italian Bakery set a Guinness World Record for the Longest Line of Cakes topped with fresh blueberries donated by local farmers. This received recognition from the Mayor Steve DiDonato and all members of the Hammonton Town Council. The Hammonton Town Council Deputy Mayor Tom Gribbin announced the recognition during a town council meeting on local TV in 2011 August.

In November 2014, in a study conducted by CreditDonkey.com, Hammonton was ranked second-happiest city in New Jersey. The ranking was based on restaurants, crime rate, commute, departure time, income, divorce rate, and housing.

=== Wineries and alcohol consumption ===
Hammonton has three active wineries – DiMatteo Vineyards, Plagido's Winery, and Tomasello Winery.

On June 7, 2013, the Eagle Theatre in Hammonton became the first theater in New Jersey to sell alcoholic beverages and allow spectators to drink wine during the show. Under an arrangement reached under the authority of the New Jersey Division of Alcoholic Beverage Control, Sharrott Winery will be able to sell patrons bottles of wine that can be consumed during shows at the theater.

Hammonton has also seen a growth in the craft beer industry. Since 2015, three breweries have opened in town, Tomfoolery Brewing Company, Three 3's Brewing Company, and Vinyl Brewing.

=== Popular culture ===
The 2002 direct-to-video horror film 13th Child, about the hunt for the Jersey Devil, was filmed in Hammonton.

A 2011 episode of Supernatural, "How to Win Friends and Influence Monsters" about the Jersey Devil, is set in Hammonton, though it wasn't filmed there.

Hammonton made a cameo appearance in the first two episodes of the HBO series Boardwalk Empire, with a scene towards the end of both episodes showing the town sign "Welcome to Hammonton, The Blueberry Capital of the World".

The Fox TV show American Idol aired its first episode of its 12th season in January 2013 with a performance by Sarah Restuccio, a seventeen-year-old girl from Hammonton. The judges enjoyed her rendition of "Mama's Song" by Carrie Underwood, but she impressed them when they asked her to sing something else and she rapped "Super Bass" by Nicki Minaj. The show featured a short clip about Sarah's life, which included showing her everyday life in Hammonton.

In October 2013 the MTV reality show True Life, featured the episode "True Life Presents: My Dad Is A Bro" about a girl in her twenties and her father in his fifties, who both party. The episode takes place throughout Hammonton.

In the summer of 2013, scenes from the independent film The Honour were filmed in Hammonton.

In May 2015, a commercial for the male clothing brand, Chubbies Shorts, was filmed on South Second Street in Hammonton.

== Notable people ==
People who were born in, residents of, or otherwise closely associated with Hammonton include:

- Ashante "Thee" Adonis (born 1990), professional wrestler with SmackDown
- Tyler Bellamy (born 1988), soccer player
- Jill Biden (born 1951), educator and First Lady of the United States from 2021 to 2025.
- Ray Blanchard (born 1945), sexologist
- Reverend Gary Davis (1896–1972), blues and gospel singer who was also proficient on the banjo, guitar and harmonica
- J. D. DiRenzo (born 1988), American football offensive lineman for the Carolina Panthers
- Anthony Durante (1967–2003), professional wrestler
- Ace Enders (born 1982), musician
- Marie Howland (1836–1921), feminist writer
- Johnnie O. Jackson (born 1971), professional bodybuilder and powerlifter
- Nelson Johnson (born 1948), former Atlantic County Superior Court Judge and author of Boardwalk Empire: The Birth, High Times, and Corruption of Atlantic City, a chapter of which about Enoch L. "Nucky" Johnson—"Atlantic City's Godfather"—became the basis for the series Boardwalk Empire
- Margaret Mead (1901–1978), cultural anthropologist who did some of her first research in Hammonton
- Victor Moore (1876–1962), actor
- Rita Myers (born 1947), video installation artist.
- George Washington Nicholson (1832–1912), landscape painter who retired to Hammonton around 1902 and lived there until his death in 1912
- Ron Previte (born 1943), former member of the Philadelphia crime family
- Thomas Ricca (Tom Ricca, born 1968) former professional WWE wrestler
- Andrew Rider (1866–1898), founder of Rider University, who lived and was buried in Hammonton
- Nicodemo Scarfo (born 1929), member of the American Mafia who was Boss of the Philadelphia crime family, who spent summers working in Hammonton as blueberry picker
- Tony Siscone (born 1949), professional race car driver
- Alma Joslyn Whiffen-Barksdale (1916–1981), mycologist who discovered cycloheximide
- Gary Wolfe (born 1967), professional wrestler

== Sister city ==
- San Gregorio da Sassola, Province of Rome, Italy
