= Jacobus Evangelical Lutheran Church =

Historic church in New Jersey, United States

- U.S. National Register of Historic Places
- New Jersey Register of Historic Places
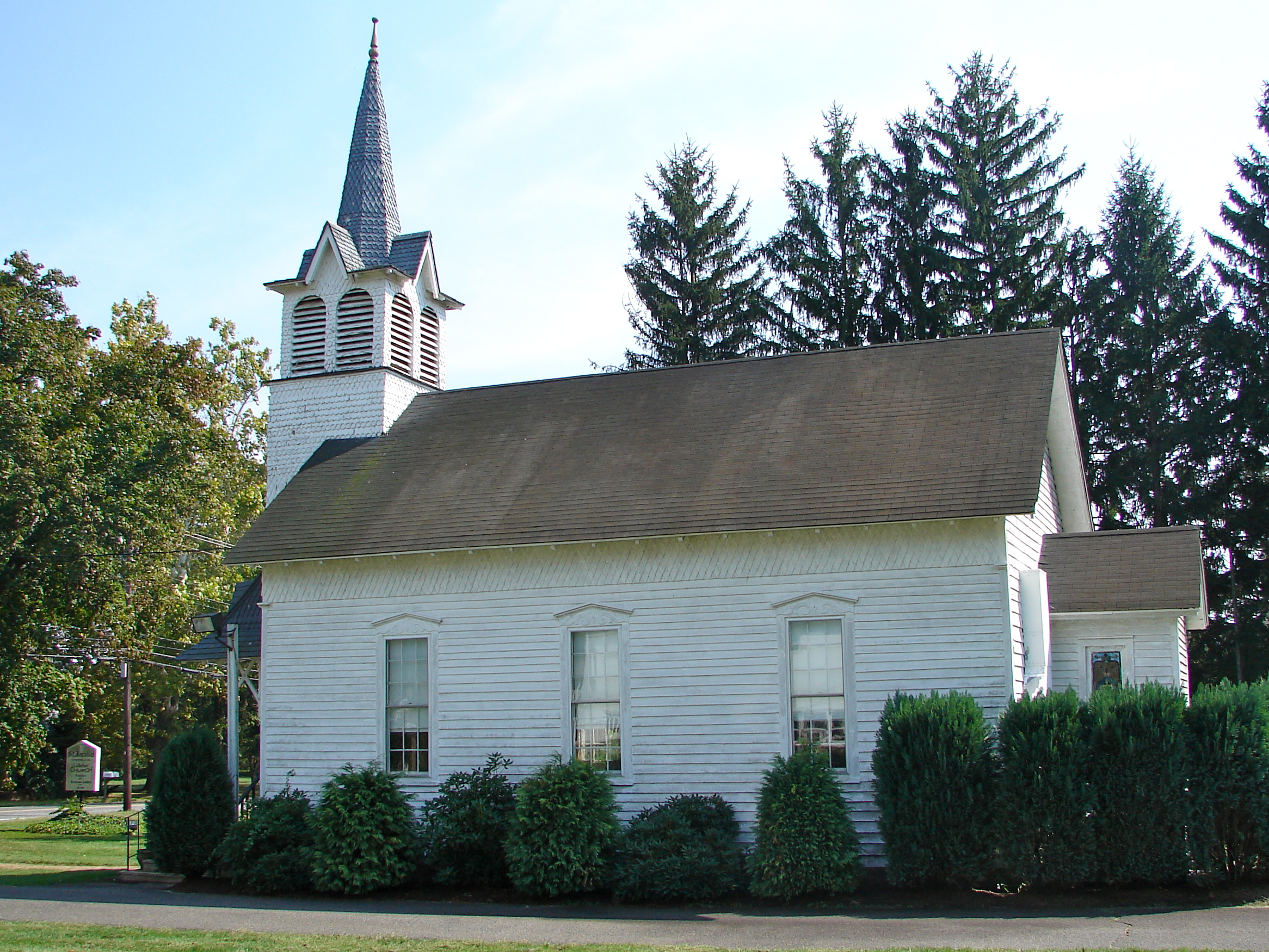

- Location within Atlantic County, New Jersey Location within New Jersey Location within the United States
- Location: Mays Landing Road and Route 54; Folsom, New Jersey
- Coordinates: 39°36′25″N 74°50′49″W
- Area: 3 acres (1.2 ha)
- Built: 1852
- Architectural style: Greek Revival, Queen Anne
- NRHP reference No.: 88000635
- NJRHP No.: 417

Significant dates
- Added to NRHP: June 9, 1988
- Designated NJRHP: September 1, 1987

Jacobus Evangelical Lutheran Church is a historic church on Mays Landing Road and Route 54 in Folsom, Atlantic County, New Jersey, United States.

It was built in 1852 and added to the National Register of Historic Places in 1988.

== See also ==
- National Register of Historic Places listings in Atlantic County, New Jersey
