= Hammonton Public Schools =

School district in Atlantic County, New Jersey, US

Address
- 566 Old Forks Road Hammonton, Atlantic County, New Jersey, 08037; United States
- Coordinates: 39.657°N 74.810°W

District information
- Grades: K-12
- Superintendent: Thomas Ramsay
- Business administrator: Barbara S. Prettyman
- Schools: 4

Students and staff
- Enrollment: 3,326 (as of 2023–24)
- Faculty: 255.0 FTEs
- Student–teacher ratio: 13.0:1

Other information
- District Factor Group: B
- Website: hammontonschools.org
Ind.	Per pupil	District spending	Rank (*)	K-12 average	%± vs. average
1A	Total Spending	$13,836	1	$18,891	−26.8%
1	Budgetary Cost	11,195	2	14,783	−24.3%
2	Classroom Instruction	6,866	3	8,763	−21.6%
6	Support Services	1,697	15	2,392	−29.1%
8	Administrative Cost	1,186	12	1,485	−20.1%
10	Operations & Maintenance	1,142	6	1,783	−36.0%
13	Extracurricular Activities	208	36	268	−22.4%
16	Median Teacher Salary	58,300	18	64,043
Data from NJDoE 2014 Taxpayers' Guide to Education Spending. *Of K-12 districts with more than 3,500 students. Lowest spending=1; Highest=103

The Hammonton Public Schools are a comprehensive community public school district that serve students in kindergarten through twelfth grade from Hammonton, in Atlantic County, in the U.S. state of New Jersey.

As of the 2023–24 school year, the district, comprised of four schools, had an enrollment of 3,326 students and 255.0 classroom teachers (on an FTE basis), for a student–teacher ratio of 13.0:1.

The district participates in the Interdistrict Public School Choice Program, which allows non-resident students to attend school in the district at no cost to their parents, with tuition covered by the resident district. Available slots are announced annually by grade.

Students from Folsom Borough (grades 9–12) and Waterford Township in Camden County (7–12) attend the Hammonton schools as part of sending/receiving relationships with the Folsom Borough School District and the Waterford Township School District.

== History ==
In November 1999, residents of Hammonton approved a referendum on construction of new schools. In 2001, the construction of the Early Childhood Education Center was completed. The new 192,500-square-foot (17,880 m^{2}) Hammonton High School building on Old Forks Road welcomed its first classes when it was opened in September 2002, having been constructed at a cost of $28.7 million of which 40% was funded by the state. The old high school building was converted to a middle school, allowing the district to accommodate the 700 students from Waterford Township who comprised a majority of the enrollment at the high school. The former high school was on Liberty Street, now home to Hammonton Middle school. Before the move, Hammonton Middle School had been located on Vine Street, at a building that is now St. Joseph High School.

In the wake of the dissolution of the Lower Camden County Regional School District, the Hammonton board of education voted in 1999 to begin accepting an estimated 800 students from Waterford Township for grades 7-12 starting as of 2002, with the tuition paid by students from Waterford helping to lower overall costs to Hammonton taxpayers.

The district had been classified by the New Jersey Department of Education as being in District Factor Group "B", the second lowest of eight groupings. District Factor Groups organize districts statewide to allow comparison by common socioeconomic characteristics of the local districts. From lowest socioeconomic status to highest, the categories are A, B, CD, DE, FG, GH, I and J.

In 2020, the district acquired the former St. Joseph High School building, which it leased to the independent St. Joseph Academy.

== Schools ==
Schools in the district (with 2023–24 enrollment data from the National Center for Education Statistics) are:

Elementary schools

- Early Childhood Education Center with 387 students in grades PreK–1
  - Amy Clauhs, supervisor
- Warren E. Sooy Elementary School with 719 students in grades 2–5
  - Kristina Tigro, principal

Middle school

- Hammonton Middle School with 834 students in grades 6–8
  - Kimberly Rudnesky, principal

High school

- Hammonton High School with 1,318 students in grades 9–12
  - Michael Mattina, principal

== Administration ==
Core members of the district's administration are:

- Thomas Ramsay, superintendent
- Barbara S. Prettyman, business administrator and board secretary

== Board of education ==
The district's board of education, composed of nine members, sets policy and oversees the fiscal and educational operation of the district through its administration. As a Type II school district, the board's trustees are elected directly by voters to serve three-year terms of office on a staggered basis, with three seats up for election each year held (since 2012) as part of the November general election. The board appoints a superintendent to oversee the district's day-to-day operations and a business administrator to supervise the business functions of the district. Representatives are appointed to represent Folsom and Waterford Township on the Hammonton board of education.
