= Waterford Township School District =

School district in Camden County, New Jersey, US

Address
- 1106 Old White Horse Pike Waterford Township, Camden County, New Jersey, 08089; United States
- Coordinates: 39.726901°N 74.852218°W

District information
- Grades: PreK-6
- Superintendent: Michael Nolan
- Business administrator: Daniel J. Fox
- Schools: 3

Students and staff
- Enrollment: 819 (as of 2018–19)
- Faculty: 78.5 FTEs
- Student–teacher ratio: 10.4:1

Other information
- District Factor Group: DE
- Website: www.wtsd.org
Ind.	Per pupil	District spending	Rank (*)	K-6 average	%± vs. average
1A	Total Spending	$15,156	8	$18,891	−19.8%
1	Budgetary Cost	14,020	26	13,649	2.7%
2	Classroom Instruction	7,860	14	8,366	−6.0%
6	Support Services	2,912	51	2,161	34.8%
8	Administrative Cost	1,525	26	1,467	4.0%
10	Operations & Maintenance	1,594	32	1,552	2.7%
16	Median Teacher Salary	54,378	18	57,437
Data from NJDoE 2014 Taxpayers' Guide to Education Spending. *Of K-6 districts with any number of students. Lowest spending=1; Highest=59

The Waterford Township School District is a community public school district that serves students in pre-kindergarten through sixth grade from Waterford Township, in Camden County, in the U.S. state of New Jersey.

As of the 2018–19 school year, the district, comprising three schools, had an enrollment of 819 students and 78.5 classroom teachers (on an FTE basis), for a student–teacher ratio of 10.4:1.

The district is classified by the New Jersey Department of Education as being in District Factor Group "DE", the fifth-highest of eight groupings. District Factor Groups organize districts statewide to allow comparison by common socioeconomic characteristics of the local districts. From lowest socioeconomic status to highest, the categories are A, B, CD, DE, FG, GH, I and J.

For seventh through twelfth grades, public school students attend the Hammonton Public Schools in Hammonton, as part of a sending/receiving relationship, alongside students from Folsom who attend for grades 9-12 as part of an agreement with the Folsom Borough School District. Schools in the Hammonton district attended by Waterford Township students (with 2018–19 enrollment data from the National Center for Education Statistics) are Hammonton Middle School with 879 students in grades 6-8 and Hammonton High School with 1,393 students in grade 9-12.

In the wake of the dissolution of the Lower Camden County Regional School District, the Hammonton board of education voted in 1999 to begin accepting an estimated 800 students from Waterford Township for grades 7-12 starting as soon as 2002, with the tuition paid by students from Waterford helping to lower overall costs to Hammonton taxpayers and the New Jersey Department of Education approved the agreement.

== Schools ==
Schools in the district (with 2018–19 enrollment data from the National Center for Education Statistics) are:

- Thomas Richards Early Childhood Center with 221 students in grades 2-3 (now PreK-K)
- Atco Elementary School with 193 students in grades K-1 (now grades 1-2)
- Waterford Elementary School with 400 students in grades 4-6

== Administration ==
The superintendent is Michael Nolan and the assistant superintendent for business is Daniel J. Fox.

== Board of education ==
The district's board of education, comprised of nine members, sets policy and oversees the fiscal and educational operation of the district through its administration. As a Type II school district, the board's trustees are elected directly by voters to serve three-year terms of office on a staggered basis, with three seats up for election each year held (since 2012) as part of the November general election. The board appoints a superintendent to oversee the district's day-to-day operations and a business administrator to supervise the business functions of the district.

In 1997 the district conducted a survey of 700 households on whether it should adopt school uniforms. 383 persons who responded indicated that they favored uniforms while 166 indicated opposition. At the time there were some members of the school board who formed a faction favoring school uniforms, while another faction opposed them.
