= Folsom Borough School District =

School district in Atlantic County, New Jersey, US

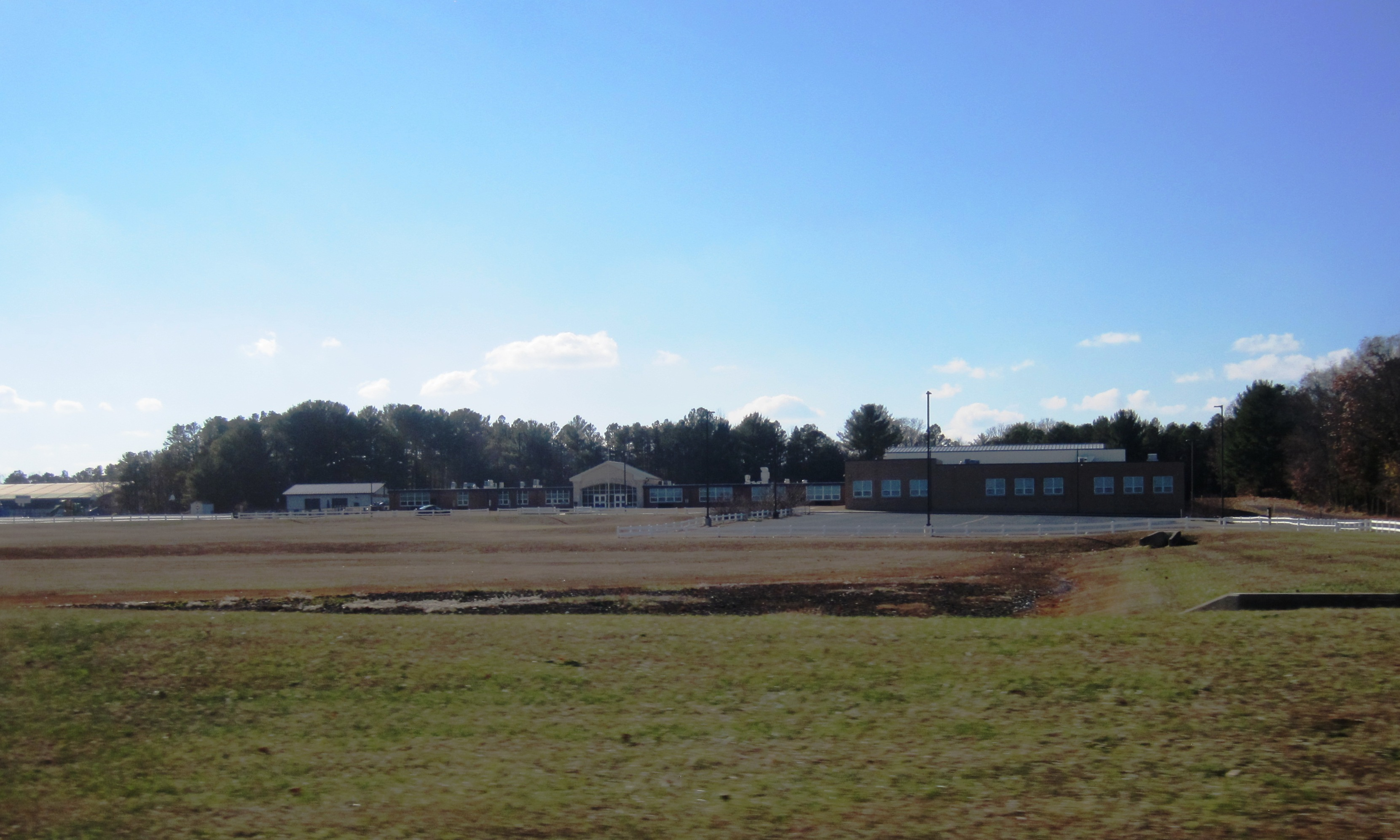
- Folsom School, the only school in the district

Address
- 1357 Mays Landing Road Folsom, Atlantic County, New Jersey, 08037; United States
- Coordinates: 39.606359°N 74.845893°W

District information
- Grades: Pre-K to 8
- Superintendent: Kevin Fricke
- Business administrator: Sara Simpson
- Schools: 1

Students and staff
- Enrollment: 384 (as of 2022–23)
- Faculty: 41.0 FTEs
- Student–teacher ratio: 9.4:1

Other information
- District Factor Group: CD
- Website: www.folsomschool.org
Ind.	Per pupil	District spending	Rank (*)	K-8 average	%± vs. average
1A	Total Spending	$14,642	2	$18,891	−22.5%
1	Budgetary Cost	13,624	25	14,159	−3.8%
2	Classroom Instruction	7,972	20	8,659	−7.9%
6	Support Services	2,202	30	2,167	1.6%
8	Administrative Cost	1,600	25	1,547	3.4%
10	Operations & Maintenance	1,683	40	1,612	4.4%
13	Extracurricular Activities	159	40	104	52.9%
16	Median Teacher Salary	51,228	3	61,136
Data from NJDoE 2014 Taxpayers' Guide to Education Spending. *Of K-8 districts with 401-750 students. Lowest spending=1; Highest=64

Folsom Borough School District is a community public school district that serves students in pre-kindergarten through eighth grade from Folsom, in Atlantic County, in the U.S. state of New Jersey.

The district participates in the Interdistrict Public School Choice Program at Folsom Elementary School, having been approved on November 2, 1999, as one of the first 10 districts statewide to participate in the program, which allows non-resident students to attend school in the district at no cost to their parents, with tuition covered by the resident district. Available slots are announced annually by grade.

As of the 2022–23 school year, the district, comprised of one school, had an enrollment of 384 students and 41.0 classroom teachers (on an FTE basis), for a student–teacher ratio of 9.4:1.

The district had been classified by the New Jersey Department of Education as being in District Factor Group "CD", the sixth-highest of eight groupings. District Factor Groups organize districts statewide to allow comparison by common socioeconomic characteristics of the local districts. From lowest socioeconomic status to highest, the categories are A, B, CD, DE, FG, GH, I and J.

For ninth through twelfth grades, public school students attend Hammonton High School, in Hammonton as part of a sending/receiving relationship with the Hammonton Public Schools, alongside students from Waterford Township, who attend for grades 7-12 as part of an agreement with the Waterford Township School District. As of the 2022–23 school year, the high school had an enrollment of 1,357 students and 92.6 classroom teachers (on an FTE basis), for a student–teacher ratio of 14.7:1.

== School ==
- Folsom School served 376 students in grades PreK-8 as of the 2023–24 school year.

== Administration ==
Core members of the district's administration are:

- Kevin Fricke, superintendent and principal
- Sara Simpson, business administrator and board secretary

== Board of education ==
The district's board of education, comprised of seven members, sets policy and oversees the fiscal and educational operation of the district through its administration. As a Type II school district, the board's trustees are elected directly by voters to serve three-year terms of office on a staggered basis, with either two or three seats up for election each year held (since 2012) as part of the November general election. The board appoints a superintendent to oversee the district's day-to-day operations and a business administrator to supervise the business functions of the district.
