= Liberty Hotel =

Liberty Hotel may refer to:

- Charles Street Jail, now known as the Liberty Hotel in Boston, Massachusetts
- Liberty Hotel (Atlantic City, New Jersey), a former hotel in Atlantic City, New Jersey
