= Northside, Atlantic City =

Neighborhood in New Jersey, US

Northside
- Neighborhood of Atlantic City
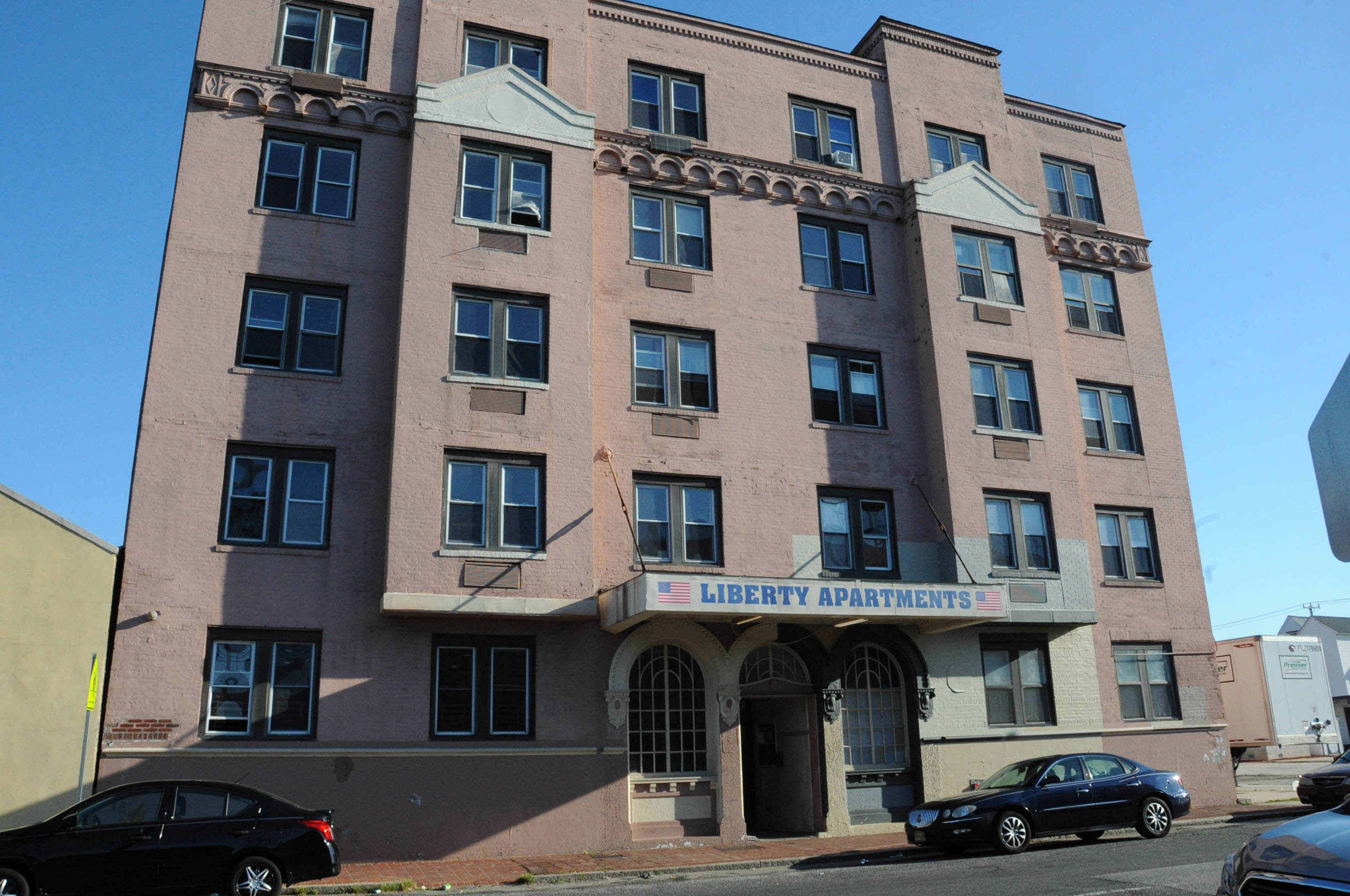
- Liberty Hotel

- Location of Northside in Atlantic County Inset: Location of county within the state of New Jersey Northside (New Jersey) Northside (the United States)
- Coordinates: 39°21′50″N 74°25′56″W
- Country: United States
- State: New Jersey
- County: Atlantic
- City: Atlantic City

The Northside was a historically African American neighborhood confined within an area of around one mile in the west side of Atlantic City. It was a neighborhood subject to the racial discrimination tactic of redlining, where investors did not invest in an area due to its demographics and prevented buildup of generational wealth. This led to many businesses and housing complexes being built by the government and wealthy black investors in the area, such as Leroy "Pop" Williams.

At its height, the Northside was a bustling neighborhood with many businesses located on Baltic and Mediterranean avenues. The Missouri Avenue Beach, nicknamed "Chicken Bone Beach" and Club Harlem were two of the most iconic attractions in the District. With the construction of the Stanley Holmes Village and other projects, more and more historic apartments were demolished.

== Historic district ==
- Northside Institutional Historic District
- U.S. National Register of Historic Places
- New Jersey Register of Historic Places
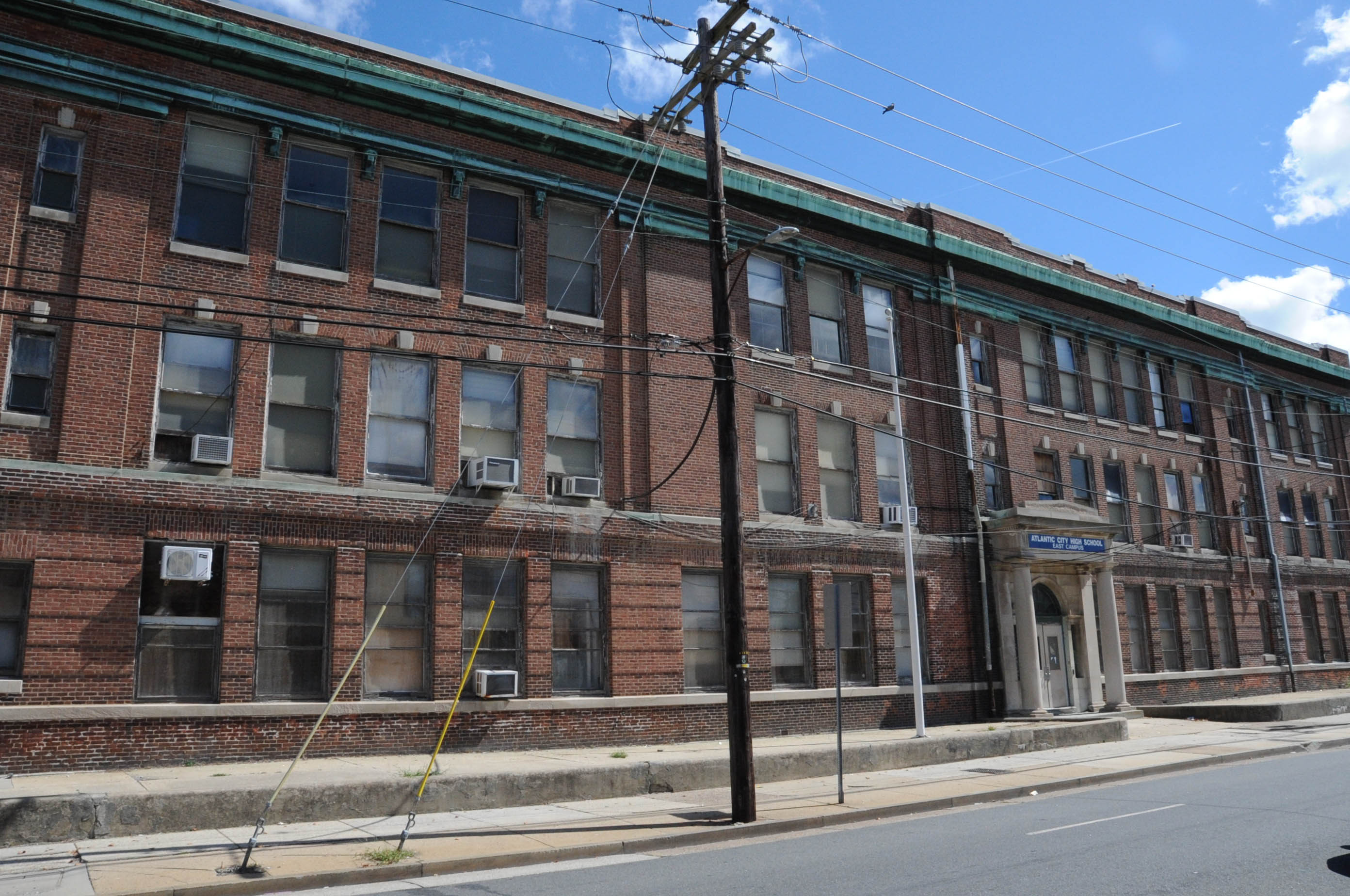
- Former Indiana Opportunity School

- Location within Atlantic County, New Jersey Location within New Jersey Location within the United States
- Location: 117, 138 North Indiana Avenue; 1707, 1711, 1713, 1714 Arctic Avenue; 61A, 61B North Martin Luther King, Jr. Boulevard, Atlantic City, New Jersey
- Coordinates: 39°21′45″N 74°26′2″W
- Area: 3 acres (1.2 ha)
- Architect: Various Black Entrepreneurs
- Architectural style: Italian Renaissance
- NRHP reference No.: 100004764
- NJRHP No.: 5695

Significant dates
- Added to NRHP: June 14, 2021
- Designated NJRHP: October 24, 2019

The Northside Institutional Historic District is a 3-acre (1.2 ha) historic district in the community. It was added to the National Register of Historic Places on June 14, 2021. The Indiana Opportunity School, St. Augustine's Episcopal Church and the New Jerusalem Church contribute to the district.

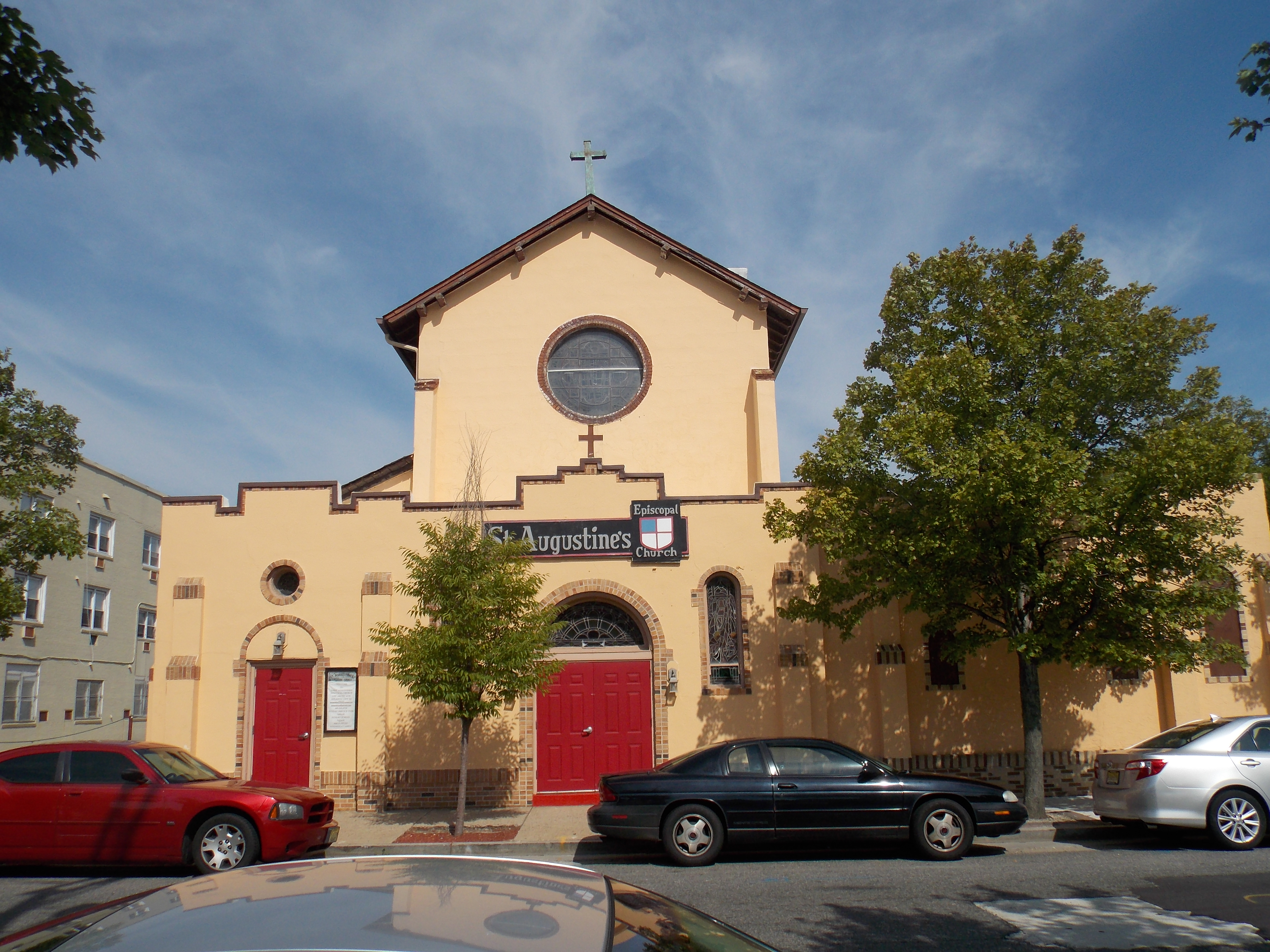
St. Augustine's Episcopal Church

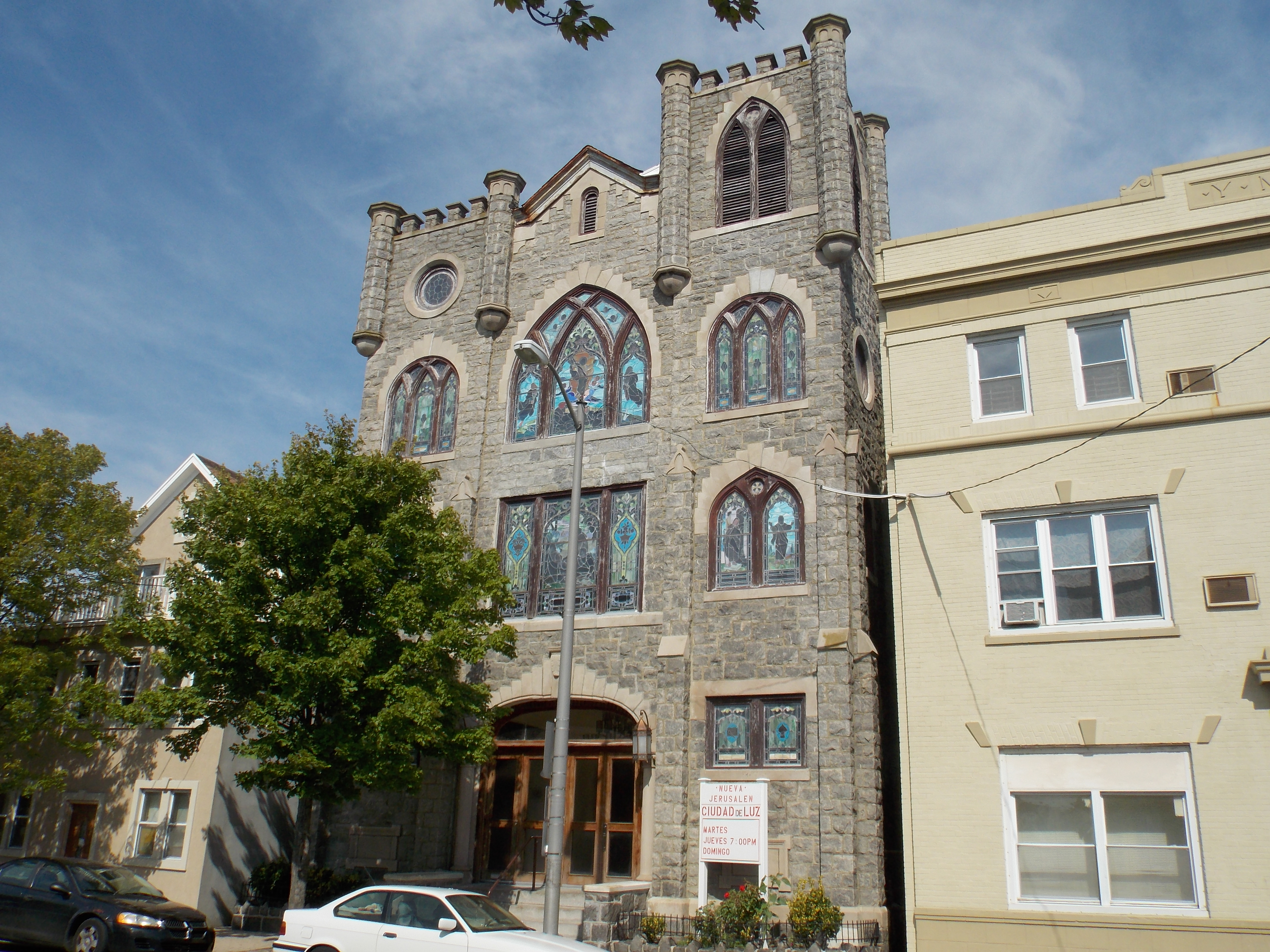
New Jerusalem Church

== See also ==
- National Register of Historic Places listings in Atlantic County, New Jersey
