= National Register of Historic Places listings in Atlantic County, New Jersey =

Location of Atlantic County in New Jersey

List of the National Register of Historic Places listings in Atlantic County, New Jersey

Contents: Counties and communities in New Jersey
Atlantic – Bergen (Closter, Franklin Lakes, Ridgewood, Saddle River, Wyckoff) – Burlington – Camden – Cape May – Cumberland – Essex – Gloucester – Hudson – Hunterdon – Mercer – Middlesex – Monmouth – Morris – Ocean – Passaic – Salem – Somerset – Sussex – Union – Warren

This is intended to be a complete list of properties and districts listed on the National Register of Historic Places in Atlantic County, New Jersey. Latitude and longitude coordinates of the sites listed on this page may be displayed in an online map.

This National Park Service list is complete through NPS recent listings posted October 16, 2026.

	Name on the Register	Image	Date listed	Location	City or town	Description
1	Absecon Lighthouse	Absecon Lighthouse	January 25, 1971 (#71000492)	Vermont and Pacific Aves. 39°21′58″N 74°24′51″W	Atlantic City	
2	Atlantic City Convention Hall	Atlantic City Convention Hall	February 27, 1987 (#87000814)	Georgia and Mississippi Aves. and the Boardwalk; 39°21′17″N 74°26′20″W	Atlantic City	
3	Atlantic City Fire Station No. 4	Atlantic City Fire Station No. 4	February 27, 2026 (#100012757)	2700 Atlantic Avenue; 39°21′19″N 74°26′40″W	Atlantic City	
4	Capt. Francis Babcock House	Capt. Francis Babcock House	July 28, 1999 (#99000907)	324 S. Shore Rd. 39°25′10″N 74°30′01″W	Absecon City	
5	Barclay Court	Barclay Court	June 22, 1988 (#88000725)	9-11 S. Pennsylvania Ave. 39°21′48″N 74°25′24″W	Atlantic City	Demolished
6	Bay Front Historic District	Bay Front Historic District	March 22, 1989 (#89000227)	Roughly bounded by Decatur Ave., Egg Harbor Bay, George Ave., and Shore Rd. 39°18′41″N 74°35′41″W	Somers Point	
7	Belcoville Post Office	Belcoville Post Office	March 14, 2008 (#08000174)	1201 Madden Ave. 39°26′14″N 74°44′00″W	Weymouth Township	
8	Bethlehem Loading Company Mays Landing Plant Archeological Historic District	Bethlehem Loading Company Mays Landing Plant Archeological Historic District	July 12, 2006 (#06000559)	Address Restricted	Estell Manor	
9	William L. Black House	William L. Black House	August 26, 1993 (#93000828)	458 Bellevue Avenue; 39°38′24″N 74°47′56″W	Hammonton	
10	Amanda Blake Store	Amanda Blake Store	January 15, 1979 (#79001469)	104 Main St. 39°31′09″N 74°29′29″W	Port Republic	
11	Church of the Ascension	Church of the Ascension	July 24, 1986 (#86001941)	1601 Pacific Ave. 39°21′35″N 74°25′47″W	Atlantic City	Demolished
12	Church of the Redeemer	Church of the Redeemer	September 10, 1992 (#92001179)	Jct. of 20th and Atlantic Aves. 39°18′34″N 74°31′51″W	Longport	Destroyed in a 2012 storm, later rebuilt.
13	John Doughty House	John Doughty House	March 5, 2002 (#02000107)	40 North Shore Rd. 39°25′28″N 74°29′56″W	Absecon City	
14	Egg Harbor Commercial Bank	Egg Harbor Commercial Bank	August 28, 2007 (#07000875)	134 Philadelphia Ave. 39°31′46″N 74°38′48″W	Egg Harbor City	
15	Estellville Glassworks Historic District	Estellville Glassworks Historic District	November 21, 1991 (#91001678)	Roughly bounded by Estell Manor Park, Stevens Cr. and NJ 50; 39°23′43″N 74°44′52″W	Estell Manor City	
16	Great Egg Coast Guard Station	Great Egg Coast Guard Station	October 31, 2005 (#05000128)	2301 Atlantic Ave. 39°18′42″N 74°31′41″W	Longport	
17	Head of the River Church	Head of the River Church	March 7, 1979 (#79001467)	NJ 49; 39°18′38″N 74°49′19″W	Estell Manor	
18	Holmhurst Hotel	Holmhurst Hotel	January 18, 1978 (#78001732)	121 S. Pennsylvania Ave. 39°21′41″N 74°25′23″W	Atlantic City	Demolished, March 1985. Now a parking lot.
19	Jacobus Evangelical Lutheran Church	Jacobus Evangelical Lutheran Church	June 9, 1988 (#88000635)	Mays Landing Rd. and NJ 54; 39°36′25″N 74°50′49″W	Folsom Borough	
20	Capt. John Jeffries Burial Marker	Capt. John Jeffries Burial Marker	June 14, 1984 (#84002511)	Palestine Bible Church Cemetery, NJ 559; 39°20′55″N 74°39′42″W	Somers Point	
21	Liberty Hotel	Liberty Hotel	March 23, 2020 (#100005102)	1519 Baltic Avenue, Northside; 39°21′52″N 74°25′55″W	Atlantic City	Also known as Liberty Apartments
22	Linwood Borough School No. 1	Linwood Borough School No. 1	December 20, 1984 (#84000510)	16 W. Poplar Ave. 39°21′03″N 74°34′04″W	Linwood	
23	Linwood Historic District	Linwood Historic District	July 13, 1989 (#89000800)	Maple and Poplar avenues, and Shore Road; 39°20′27″N 74°34′30″W	Linwood	
24	Lucy, the Margate Elephant	Lucy, the Margate Elephant	August 12, 1971 (#71000493)	Decatur and Atlantic Aves. 39°19′15″N 74°30′42″W	Margate City	
25	Madison Hotel	Madison Hotel	December 20, 1984 (#84000506)	123 S. Illinois Ave. 39°21′28″N 74°25′49″W	Atlantic City	
26	Marven Gardens Historic District	Marven Gardens Historic District	September 13, 1990 (#90001440)	Bounded by Ventnor, Fredericksburg, Winchester and Brunswick Aves. 39°20′00″N 74°29′43″W	Margate City	
27	Mays Landing Historic District	Mays Landing Historic District	August 23, 1990 (#90001245)	East and West Main streets and intersecting streets 39°27′06″N 74°43′51″W	Mays Landing	Includes Mays Landing Presbyterian Church and Samuel Richards Hotel
28	Mays Landing Presbyterian Church	Mays Landing Presbyterian Church	April 20, 1982 (#82003261)	Main Street and Cape May Avenue; 39°27′09″N 74°43′40″W	Mays Landing	
29	Morton Hotel	Morton Hotel	July 15, 1977 (#77000843)	150 S. Virginia Ave. 39°21′34″N 74°25′14″W	Atlantic City	Demolished, now occupied by Trump Taj Mahal
30	Neutral Water Health Resort Sanitarium	Neutral Water Health Resort Sanitarium	March 20, 1991 (#91000267)	Junction of Claudius Street and London Avenue; 39°32′11″N 74°38′34″W	Egg Harbor City	
31	Northside Institutional Historic District	Northside Institutional Historic District	June 14, 2021 (#100004764)	117, 138 North Indiana Avenue; 1707, 1711, 1713, 1714 Arctic Avenue; 61A, 61B Martin Luther King Jr. Blvd., Northside; 39°21′45″N 74°26′02″W	Atlantic City	
32	Dr. Jonathan Pitney House	Dr. Jonathan Pitney House	August 14, 1998 (#98001062)	57 N. Shore Road; 39°25′31″N 74°29′55″W	Absecon City	
33	Pleasant Mills	Pleasant Mills	March 3, 1995 (#95000182)	Elwood-Pleasant Mills Rd., E side 39°38′13″N 74°39′39″W	Mullica Township	
34	Port Republic Historic District	Port Republic Historic District	May 16, 1991 (#91000596)	Roughly bounded by Mill St., Clark's Landing Rd., Adams Ave., Port Republic-Smithville Rd. and Riverside Dr. 39°31′15″N 74°29′35″W	Port Republic	Includes Amanda Blake Store
35	Samuel Richards Hotel	Samuel Richards Hotel	August 31, 1979 (#79001468)	106 E. Main Street; 39°27′04″N 74°43′31″W	Mays Landing	Also known as the American Hotel
36	Jeremiah II or Edward Risley House	Jeremiah II or Edward Risley House	May 31, 1991 (#91000609)	8 Virginia Ave. 39°22′32″N 74°32′22″W	Northfield	
37	Risley School	Risley School	May 4, 2011 (#11000256)	134 Cape May Ave. 39°22′37″N 74°49′29″W	Estell Manor	
38	USCS Robert J. Walker	USCS Robert J. Walker	March 19, 2014 (#14000064)	Ten miles off the New Jersey coast 39°16′44″N 74°15′24″W	Atlantic City	
39	St. Nicholas of Tolentine Church	St. Nicholas of Tolentine Church	February 2, 2001 (#01000039)	1409 Pacific Avenue; 39°21′38″N 74°25′41″W	Atlantic City	
40	Santa Rita Apartments	Santa Rita Apartments	June 14, 1991 (#91000675)	66 S. South Carolina Ave. 39°21′40″N 74°25′35″W	Atlantic City	Demolished
41	Segal Building	Segal Building	February 9, 1984 (#84002517)	1200 Atlantic Ave. 39°21′46″N 74°25′35″W	Atlantic City	
42	Shelburne Hotel	Shelburne Hotel	May 19, 1978 (#78001733)	Michigan Ave. and the Boardwalk; 39°21′21″N 74°26′03″W	Atlantic City	Demolished
43	Smithville Apothecary	Smithville Apothecary	June 9, 1978 (#78001734)	Off Moss Mill Rd. 39°29′47″N 74°27′49″W	Smithville	
44	Somers Mansion	Somers Mansion	December 18, 1970 (#70000378)	Shore Rd. and Somers Point Circle; 39°18′33″N 74°35′55″W	Somers Point	
45	John Stafford Historic District	John Stafford Historic District	June 9, 1988 (#88000723)	Roughly bounded by Atlantic Ave., Vassar Ave., Boardwalk, and Austin Ave. 39°20′35″N 74°28′01″W	Ventnor City	
46	Tofani–DiMuzio House	Tofani–DiMuzio House	October 30, 2015 (#15000762)	12 S. Cambridge Ave. 39°20′18″N 74°28′47″W	Ventnor City	
47	Ventnor City Hall	Ventnor City Hall	October 10, 1996 (#96001088)	6201 Atlantic Ave. 39°20′15″N 74°28′49″W	Ventnor City	
48	Weymouth	Weymouth	April 25, 1985 (#85000874)	Address Restricted	Hamilton Township	Surviving hulk of schooner
49	Weymouth Road Bridge	Weymouth Road Bridge	June 21, 2001 (#01000671)	Weymouth Rd. 39°31′07″N 74°46′45″W	Hamilton Township	
50	World War I Memorial	World War I Memorial	August 28, 1981 (#81000388)	O'Donnell Pkwy., S. Albany and Ventnor Aves. 39°21′05″N 74°27′19″W	Atlantic City	

== Former listings ==
	Name on the Register	Image	Date listed	Date removed	Location	City or town	Description
1	Marlborough-Blenheim Hotel	Marlborough-Blenheim Hotel	August 23, 1977 (#77000842)	January 25, 1979	Boardwalk and Ohio Aves.	Atlantic City	Imploded on January 4, 1979.
2	Traymore Hotel	Traymore Hotel	December 13, 1971 (#71001049)	October 2, 1972	Illinois Ave. and Boardwalk.	Atlantic City	Imploded on April 27, 1972.
3	U.S. Coast Guard Station		June 23, 1976 (#76001144)	March 10, 1977	About 3 mi. NNE of Brigantine City	Brigantine City vicinity	Destroyed by fire on February 25, 1977.
