= Great Egg Coast Guard Station =

- U.S. National Register of Historic Places
- New Jersey Register of Historic Places
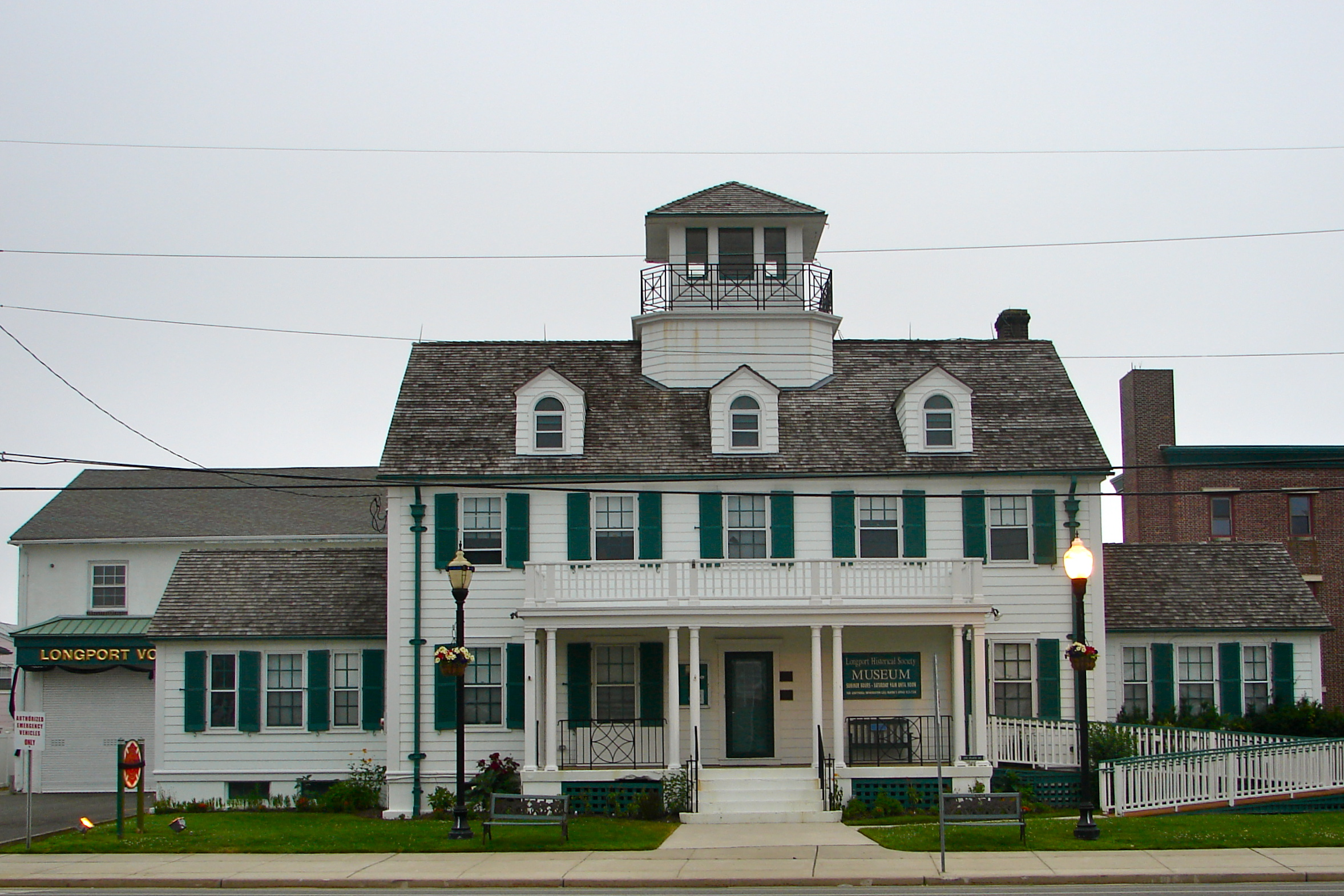

- Location within Atlantic County, New Jersey Location within New Jersey Location within the United States
- Location: 2301 Atlantic Avenue, Longport, New Jersey
- Coordinates: 39°18′49″N 74°31′41″W
- Area: 0.2 acres (0.081 ha)
- Built: 1939
- Architectural style: Colonial Revival
- NRHP reference No.: 05000128
- NJRHP No.: 4255

Significant dates
- Added to NRHP: October 31, 2005
- Designated NJRHP: January 4, 2005

Great Egg Coast Guard Station, is located in Longport, Atlantic County, New Jersey, United States. The station was built in 1939 and added to the National Register of Historic Places on October 31, 2005.

== See also ==
- National Register of Historic Places listings in Atlantic County, New Jersey
