= Smithville Apothecary =

Historic building in New Jersey, US

- U.S. National Register of Historic Places
- New Jersey Register of Historic Places
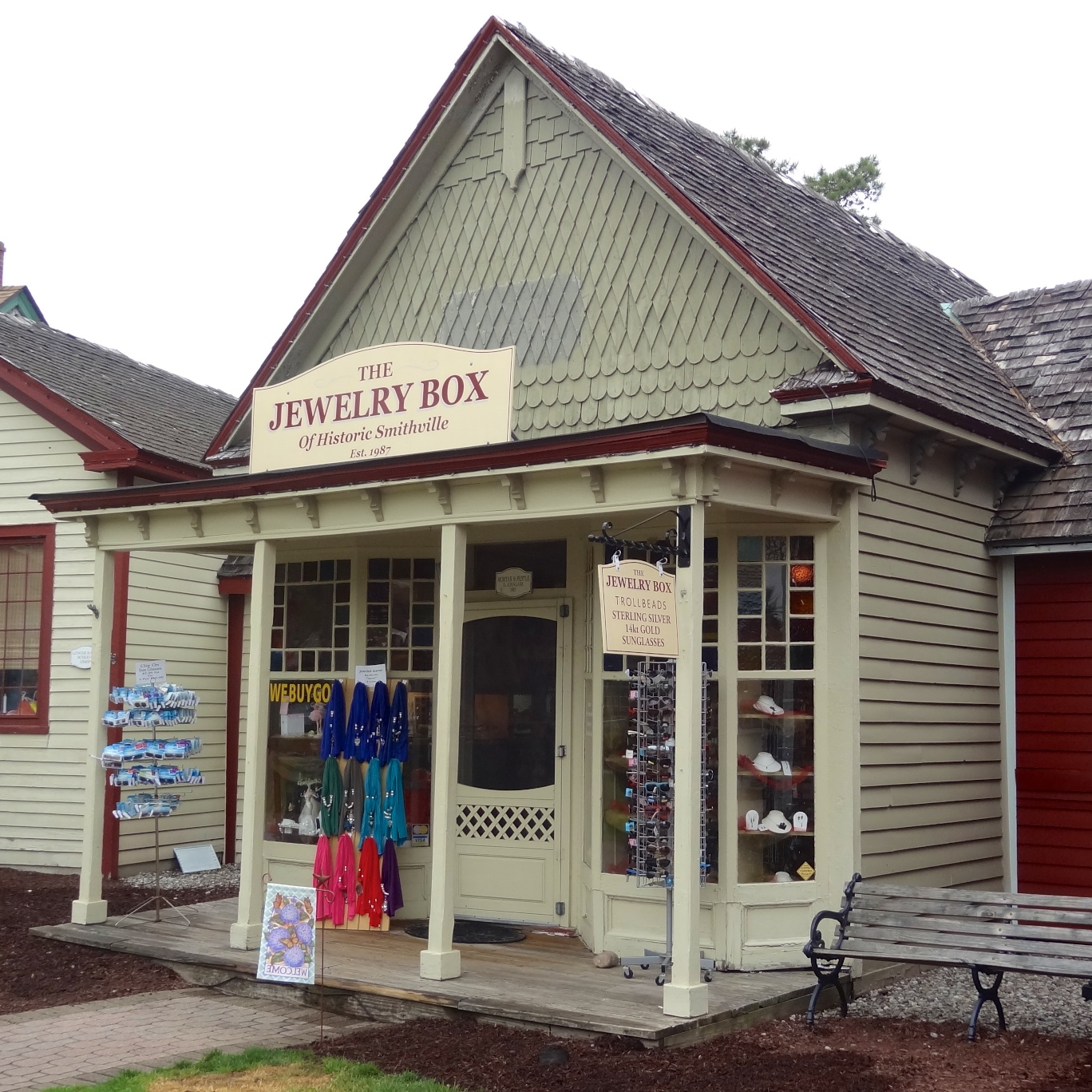

- Location within Atlantic County, New Jersey Location within New Jersey Location within the United States
- Location: Off Moss Mill Road, Smithville, Atlantic County, New Jersey
- Coordinates: 39°29′47″N 74°27′49″W
- Built: c. 1885
- Built by: Dr. John Lewis Lane
- Architectural style: Queen Anne
- NRHP reference No.: 78001734
- NJRHP No.: 422

Significant dates
- Added to NRHP: June 9, 1978
- Designated NJRHP: December 20, 1976

The Smithville Apothecary is a historic Queen Anne-style building located off Moss Mill Road in Smithville, Atlantic County, New Jersey. It was added to the National Register of Historic Places on June 9, 1978, for its significance in architecture and commerce.

== History ==
The pharmacy was built c. 1885 by Dr. John Lewis Lane in Manahawkin, Ocean County, New Jersey. The building was sold in 1894 and became the Barnegat Exchange of the telephone company. Next it was used as the local post office, and then as a headquarters for the local Girl Scouts. Finally, it was purchased by the Smithville Inn. The building was then moved to its current location in Historic Smithville, where it is now the Jewelry Box of Smithville.

== See also ==
- National Register of Historic Places listings in Atlantic County, New Jersey
