= William L. Black House =

Historic house in Hammonton, New Jersey

- U.S. National Register of Historic Places
- New Jersey Register of Historic Places
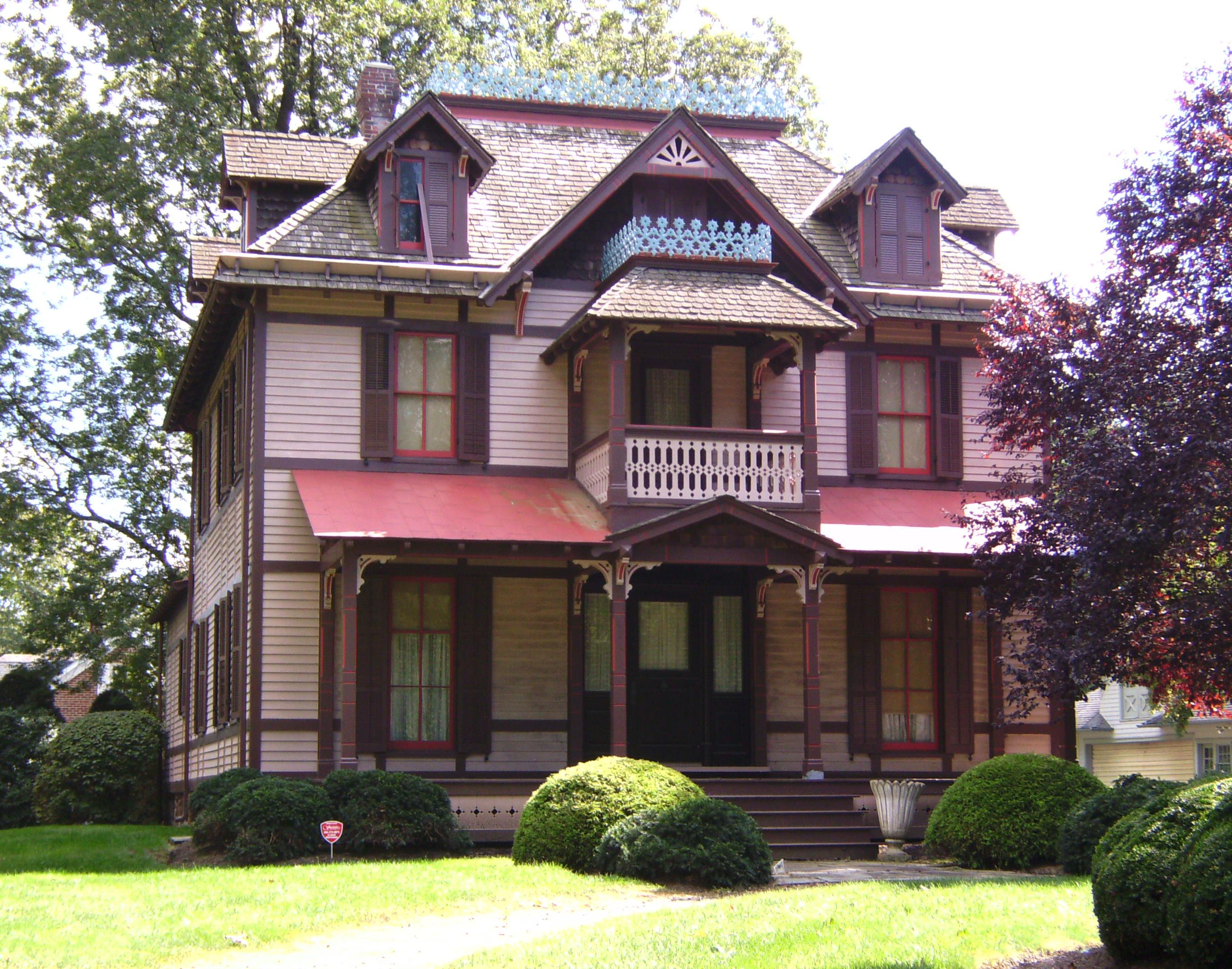
- Front view

- Location within Atlantic County, New Jersey Location within New Jersey Location within the United States
- Location: 458 Bellevue Avenue, Hammonton, New Jersey
- Coordinates: 39°38′24″N 74°47′56″W
- Built: c. 1884
- Architectural style: Stick/Eastlake
- NRHP reference No.: 93000828
- NJRHP No.: 344

Significant dates
- Added to NRHP: August 26, 1993
- Designated NJRHP: July 2, 1993

The William L. Black House is a historic residence located at 458 Bellevue Avenue in the town of Hammonton in Atlantic County, New Jersey. It was listed on the National Register of Historic Places on August 26, 1993, for its significance in architecture and commerce.

== History and description ==
The house was designed by the architect Frank Furness in the Eastlake / Stick architecture style, featuring a steeply pitched roof, decorative trusses, and overhanging eaves It was built around 1884 for William Lincoln Black, a merchant who ran Black's General Store in Hammonton.

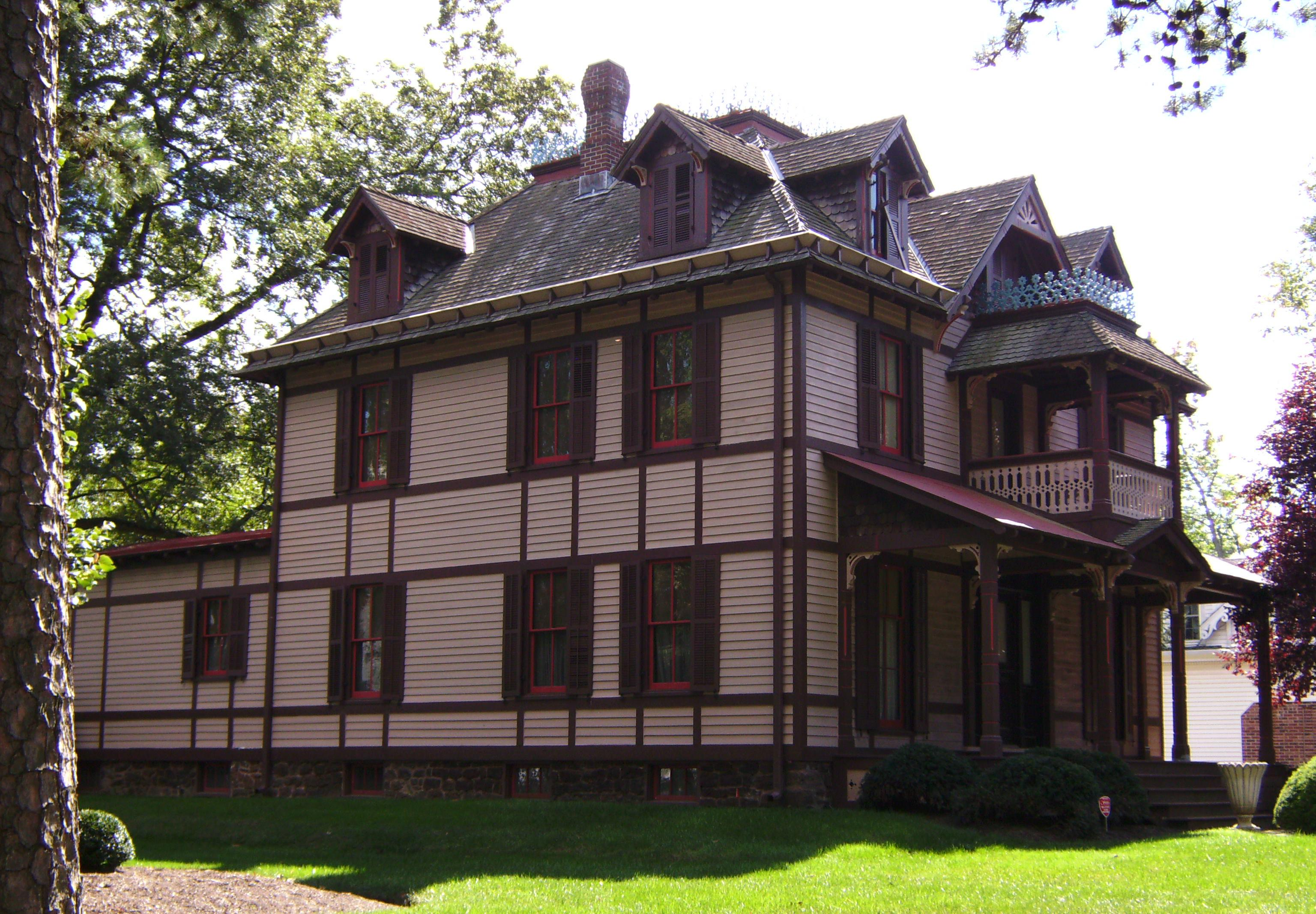
side view

== See also ==
- National Register of Historic Places listings in Atlantic County, New Jersey
