= Weymouth (schooner) =

- U.S. National Register of Historic Places
- New Jersey Register of Historic Places
- Nearest city: Hamilton Township, New Jersey
- Built: 1860
- Architect: Samuel Gaskill
- NRHP reference No.: 85000874
- NJRHP No.: 342

Significant dates
- Added to NRHP: April 25, 1985
- Designated NJRHP: March 12, 1985

Weymouth was a schooner that carried coal on the Great Egg Harbor River. She was built in 1868 as a 60-ton, two-masted schooner by carpenter Samuel Gaskill at what is now Gaskill Park, Mays Landing, New Jersey. She was used to ship charcoal and other goods produced in the Pine Barrens along the Atlantic coast until the early 1890s, when she was left tied to a dock, as was common with retired merchant ships at the time. She came loose from her dock on the Great Egg Harbor River (a local man named Harrison Wilson later claimed to have cut her mooring lines as a child) and ran aground on tidal mud flats about a mile downstream; her owners, lacking the money to move her, abandoned her.

Her surviving hulk, the above-water parts of which have mostly been eroded away, is located in the Mays Landing section of Hamilton Township, Atlantic County, New Jersey, United States. The hulk was added to the National Register of Historic Places on April 25, 1985, for its significance in engineering and transportation. The nomination was produced through the efforts of archaeologist Alan Mounier.

== See also ==
- National Register of Historic Places listings in Atlantic County, New Jersey
