= Church of the Ascension (Atlantic City, New Jersey) =

- U.S. National Register of Historic Places
- New Jersey Register of Historic Places
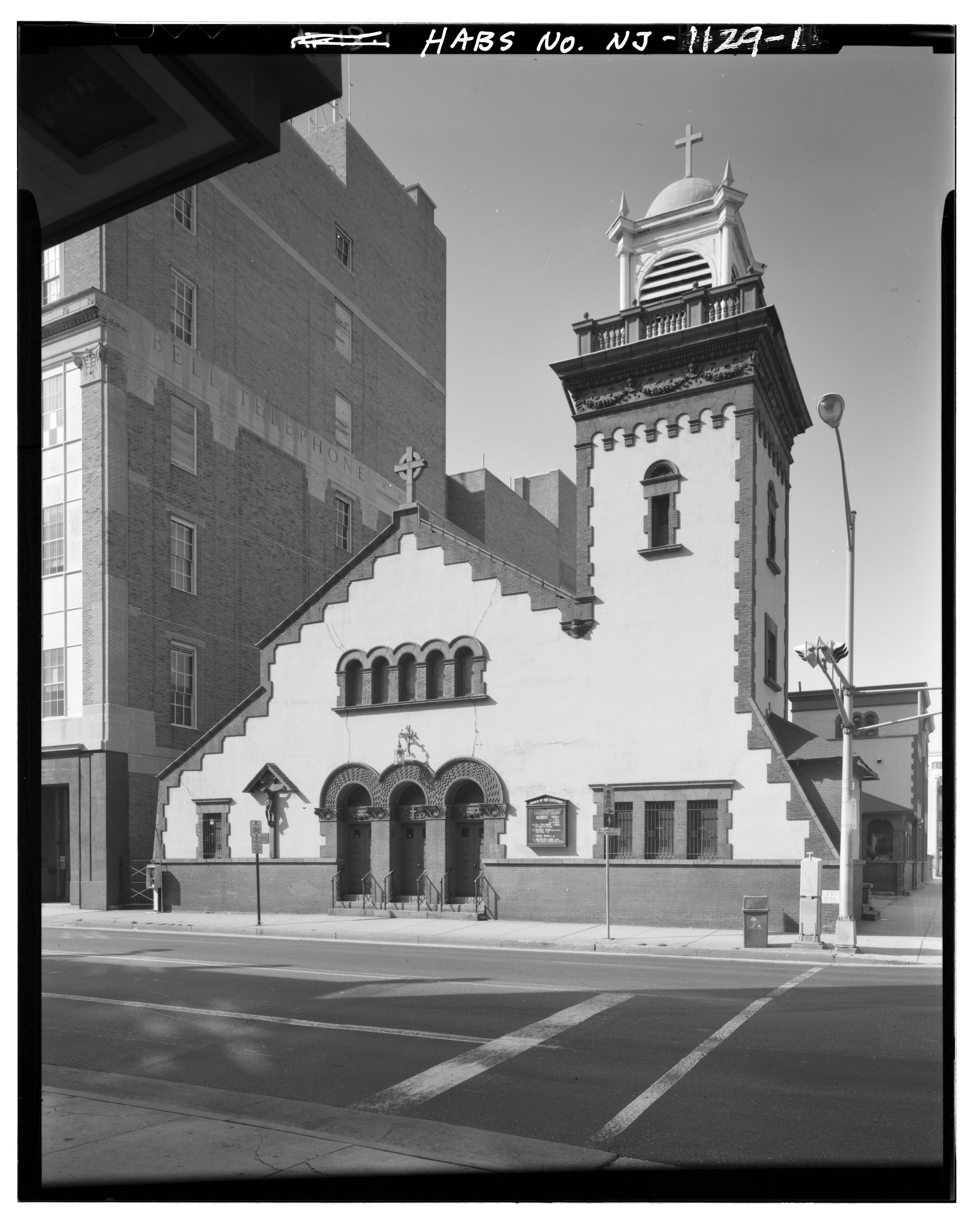

- Location within Atlantic County, New Jersey Location within New Jersey Location within the United States
- Location: 1601 Pacific Avenue, Atlantic City, New Jersey
- Coordinates: 39°21′34.6″N 74°25′47.0″W
- Area: 1 acre (0.40 ha)
- Built: 1893
- Architect: Johnson, Lindley; Watson, Frank A.
- Architectural style: Renaissance, Romanesque, Spanish Renaissance
- NRHP reference No.: 86001941
- NJRHP No.: 393

Significant dates
- Added to NRHP: July 24, 1986
- Designated NJRHP: June 16, 1986

Church of the Ascension was a historic church building at 1601 Pacific Avenue in Atlantic City, Atlantic County, New Jersey, United States. The church was built in 1893 and demolished in July 2017.

At the time of its incorporation in 1854, Atlantic City, on Absecon Island, was seen as a prime location for the development of a resort town. Although by 1874 nearly 500,000 visitors would come to the city during its peak tourist season, its resident population was comparatively minimal at 1,043 in 1870 and 5,477 in 1880.

In the earliest decades of the city's history, church services, like many of the amenities and attractions in the resort town, were exclusive to the summer months when the population swelled enough to fill scattered denominational churches to capacity. By the 1870s, devout Episcopalian residents, unsettled by the lack of year-round services at St. Mark's Episcopal Church, began a movement to permanently institute religious services in Atlantic City. When the 1879 summer tourist season began, year-round church services were instituted as Alfred M. Heston, historian and author of Heston’s Handbook: Atlantic City Illustrated, wrote: “The Church of the Ascension was organized as an all-the-year-round parish in 1879, principally through the efforts of Mrs. Francis W. Hemsley, the daughter of Bishop Underdonk and mother of Frederick Hemsley, present owner of the Hotel Brighton.” The Hemsleys, whose son Frederick was the grantor of the plot of land on which the church was built, were parishioners of the church who did much to establish the city as a year-round destination; according to Heston, Francis Hemsley in 1876, “announced that the Hotel Brighton would thereafter be conducted as an all-the-year-round hotel. Mr. Hemsley thus inaugurated the winter season which has contributed so much to the popularity of Atlantic City as a health resort. The winter and spring business at many of the hotels is now more profitable than the summer business.” Francis Hemsley had retired to Atlantic City “in the early 70’s for the benefit of his health” before his death in 1882.

Until 1900, almost all structures in Atlantic City were frame houses built of timber rather than more vigorous or durable materials. This coexistence of permanent and impermanent building traditions lasted through the early decades of the twentieth century, after which the devastation caused by several fires was significant enough to warrant construction of a more solid, fire-resistant building stock. In 1886, the original timber frame Church of the Ascension was relocated from the intersection of Michigan and Pacific avenues to its ultimate location at the northwest corner of Pacific and Kentucky avenues to suit a parish desire for a more central location. The timber-frame church was demolished in 1883 to allow construction of the Spanish Renaissance-style Church of the Ascension, which was designed by Philadelphia-based architect Lindley Johnson. The development of the church from a “frame chapel” at the intersection of Michigan and Pacific avenues to the eclectic structure that stood at the intersection of Kentucky and Pacific avenues is best summarized by an entry in The Daily Union History of Atlantic City, New Jersey: "Rev. J. Rice Taylor, the first rector, began regular services in June, 1880, which have been maintained without intermission ever since. Under his direction, the parish was duly incorporated January 3, 1881, entering legally and canonically into possession of the church property. Rev. Wm. H. Avery succeeded to the rectorship in February 1882 and continued in charge for some years. In 1886, the vestry, seeking a more central and convenient location bought ground at Pacific and Kentucky Avenues and with the advice and consent of the canonical authorities removed the frame chapel thither adding an annex for Sunday school purposes. Rev. J. H. Townsend became rector December 1, 1891, and laid the corner stone of the present edifice April 27, 1893, which was completed by the liberal offerings of resident and transient worshippers and opened for use May 13, 1894. This structure was designed by Mr. Lindley Johnson is in the Spanish Renaissance style and is a good example of a commodious yet inexpensive hard material building well adapted to the varying needs of this population and climate."

The decision to commission Philadelphia-based architect Lindley Johnson to design the church is likely traceable to Francis Hemsley's son, Frederick, who had commissioned Johnson for the construction of a pair of residences in Germantown, Philadelphia, and six cottages in the Chelsea section of Atlantic City, including his residence at the intersection of Maryland and Pacific avenues. In 1900, the Church of the Ascension parish house and auditorium were designed and constructed, possibly by Lindley Johnson, who was still in active practice at the time. The parish house and auditorium, which ran north along Kentucky Avenue from the rear of the church, were executed in a manner meant to balance and unify the original composition through identical coloration and materials.

In 1916, fire destroyed the adjacent Overbrook Hotel (formerly the New Dunlop Hotel, Hotel Abbey, and Pacific Hotel) and several timber frame residences and resulted in five fatalities. Though some of the more sensationalist news articles would report that the church was destroyed in the blaze, Church of the Ascension survived with minimal damage except to ten stained glass panels embedded in the elevation adjacent to the hotel. Lavers & Westlake, who created the original panels, re-executed identical stained glass windows from original drawings, and all damaged windows were replaced in kind. Months later, to complete the campaign of repair and improvement, heating was installed under the pews to keep parishioners warm during service.

In 1922, the eminent Philadelphia-based ecclesiastical architect Frank Rushmore Watson completed improvements to the chancel, which include the addition of four D’Ascenzo Studios stained glass windows. In about 1924, The New Jersey Bell Telephone Company, which previously had an office across the street on Pacific Avenue, constructed a five-story office tower, purchasing and demolishing the church's auditorium in the process.

Church of the Ascension was inscribed to the National Register of Historic Places in 1986. Its more recent history is included in the National Register of Historic Places Inventory Nomination Form, which was initiated by members of the parish on the occasion of the church's centennial in 1984: “The present lot was purchased in January 1886 and the wooden church was moved in the spring of that year. At that time, the entrance was on Kentucky Avenue. The second rector, John H. Townsend assumed the pastorate in 1891. A dynamic priest, he immediately planned a new church building. The chimes were given by the Hemsley family, and Miss Josephine Fletcher organized and directed the boys’ choir which took part in the first service, held Whitsunday May 13, 1894. In the fall of 1896, a pipe organ was installed and Mr. Alber Dietz came from New York City as the first full-time organist and choir master. In 1900 this office was filled by Mr. Alger E. Weeden, who held his post for forty years and left his imprint on both the parish and the whole community. The same year also saw the construction of the parish hall buildings as well as the beginnings of St. Augustine's and All Saints’ Chapels, starting the realization of Father Townsend's dream of Ascension as mother church. Soon after, Church of the Good Shepherd was built in the inlet section. ... In this, our Centennial Year, we look forward to a second century of service as a missionary parish for Christ and His Church. The parish must stand as a witness to the Catholic faith of the Episcopal Church in downtown Atlantic City. In this time of citywide transition, the Church of the Ascension offers an enduring message: ‘with God’s help, we shall be of even greater service to the community: to His great glory. ... As of this writing (November 1983) there remain two Episcopal Churches in the City of Atlantic City—the Church of the Ascension and St. Augustine’s. Where there were once five Episcopal Churches in Atlantic City there are now just two. The Church of the Ascension being the “mother church” must survive and become a landmark in the ever changing facade of Atlantic City.”

In 2015, Church of the Ascension was closed and the historic stained glass windows were removed from the building. Jonathan Elliott, the director of communications for Episcopal Diocese of New Jersey at the time of the closure, was quoted in a May 2016 Press of Atlantic City article as follows: “'It's fair to say the building was closed because it is structurally unsound,' Elliott said. He said an engineering firm determined in mid-2014 that the condition of the church, specifically the bell tower, 'presented a danger to the community' and that 'to make it safe, inhabitable and up to code would take a minimum of $2.5 million.'"

Church of the Ascension was demolished in July 2017.

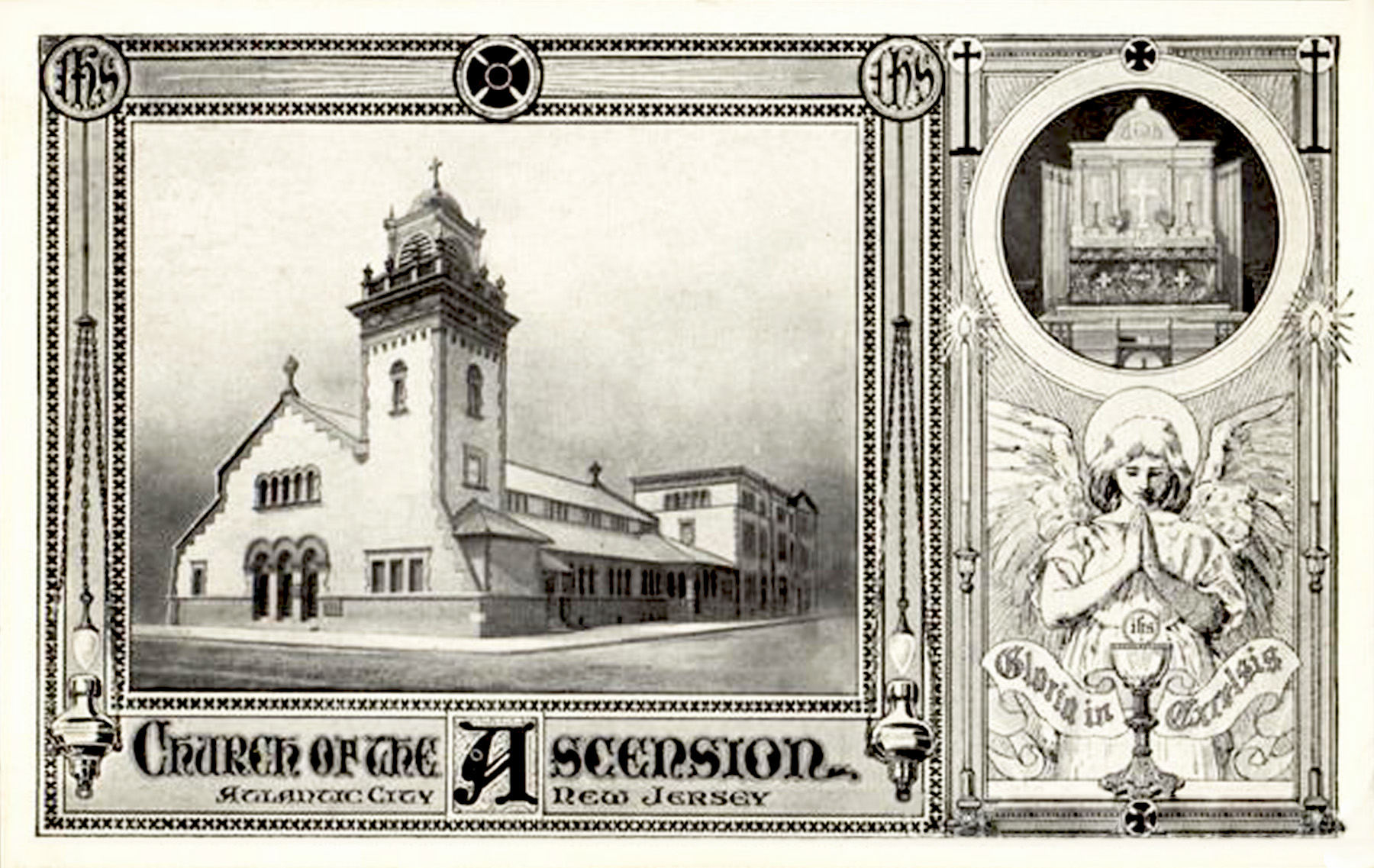

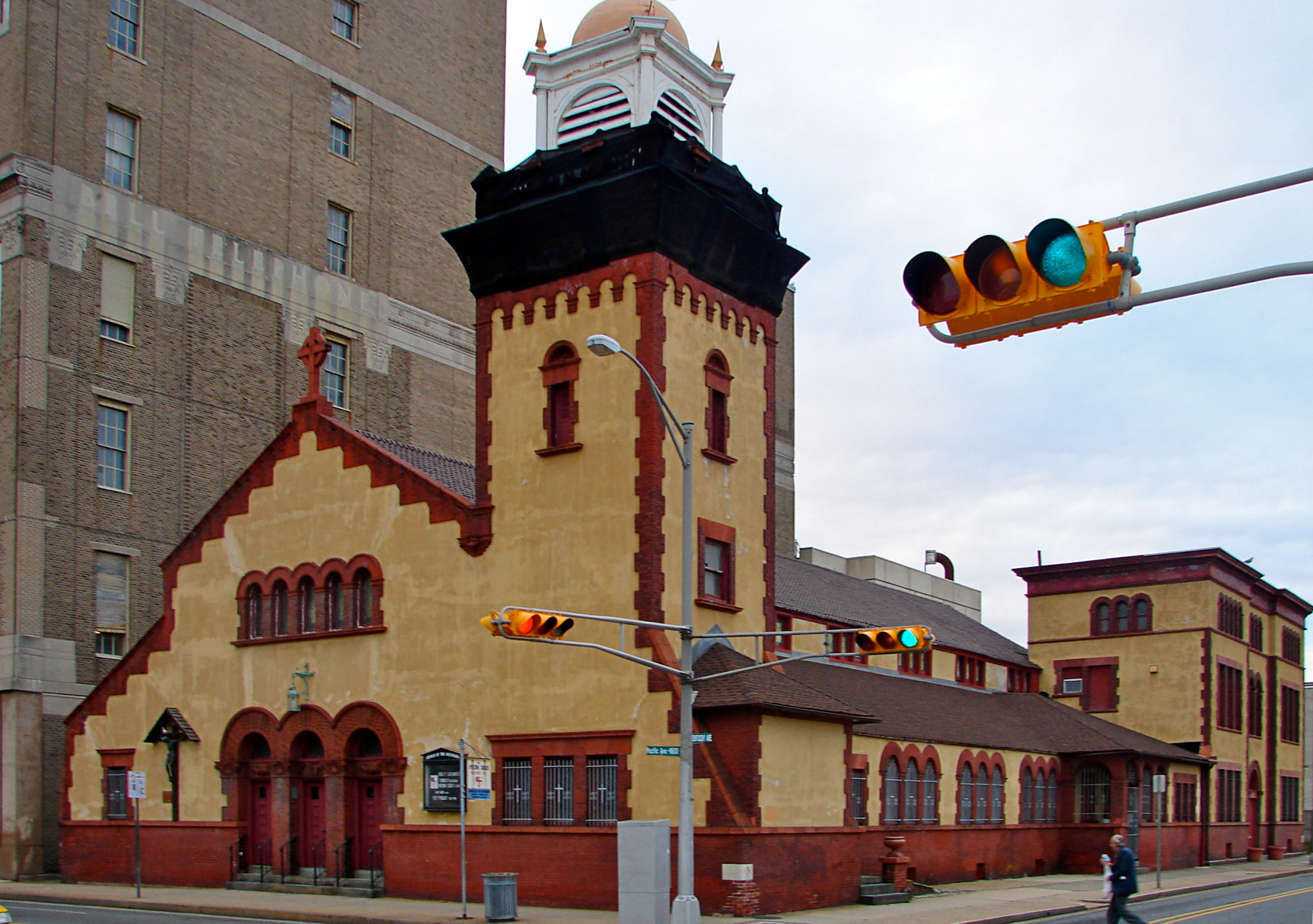

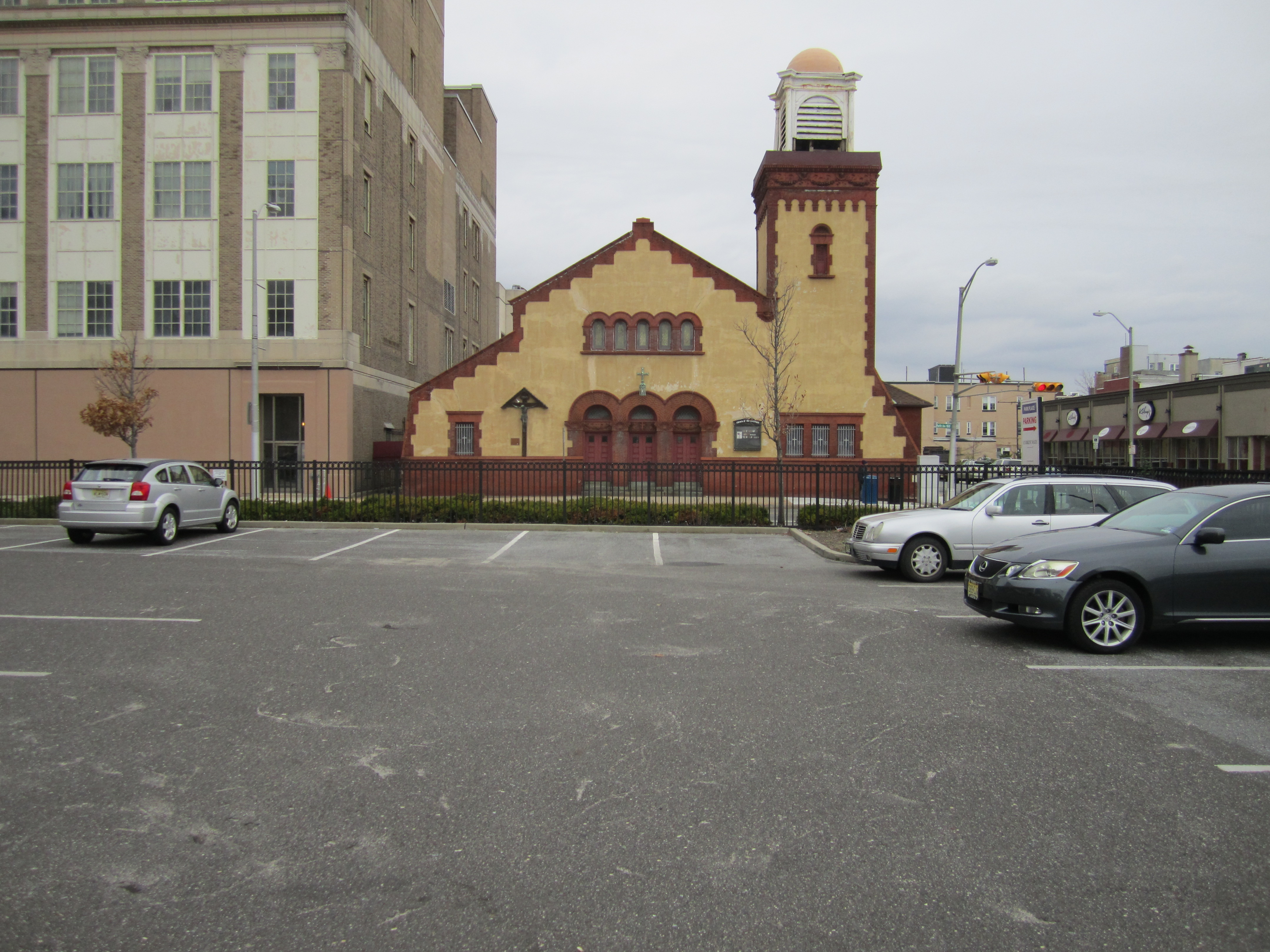

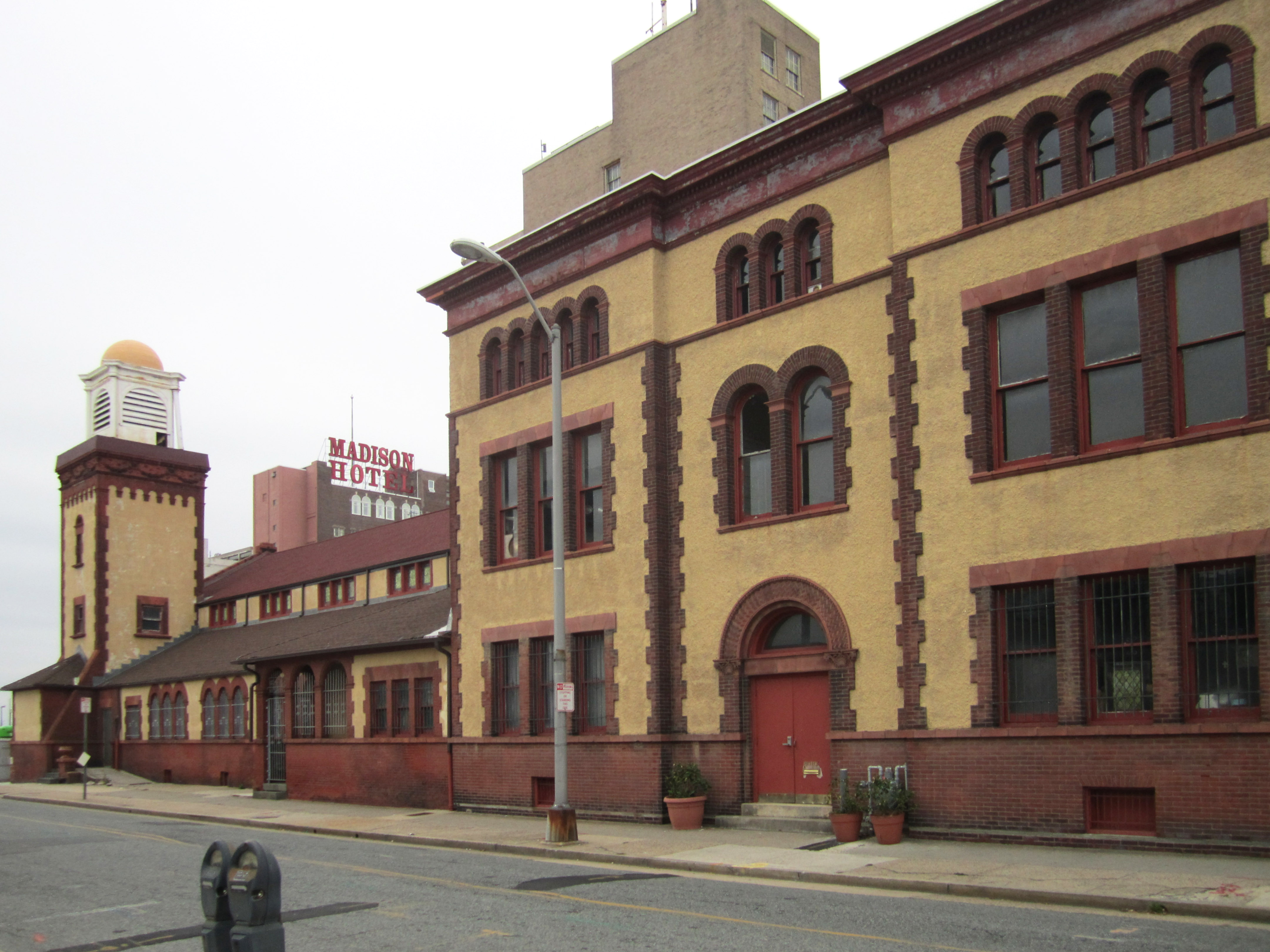

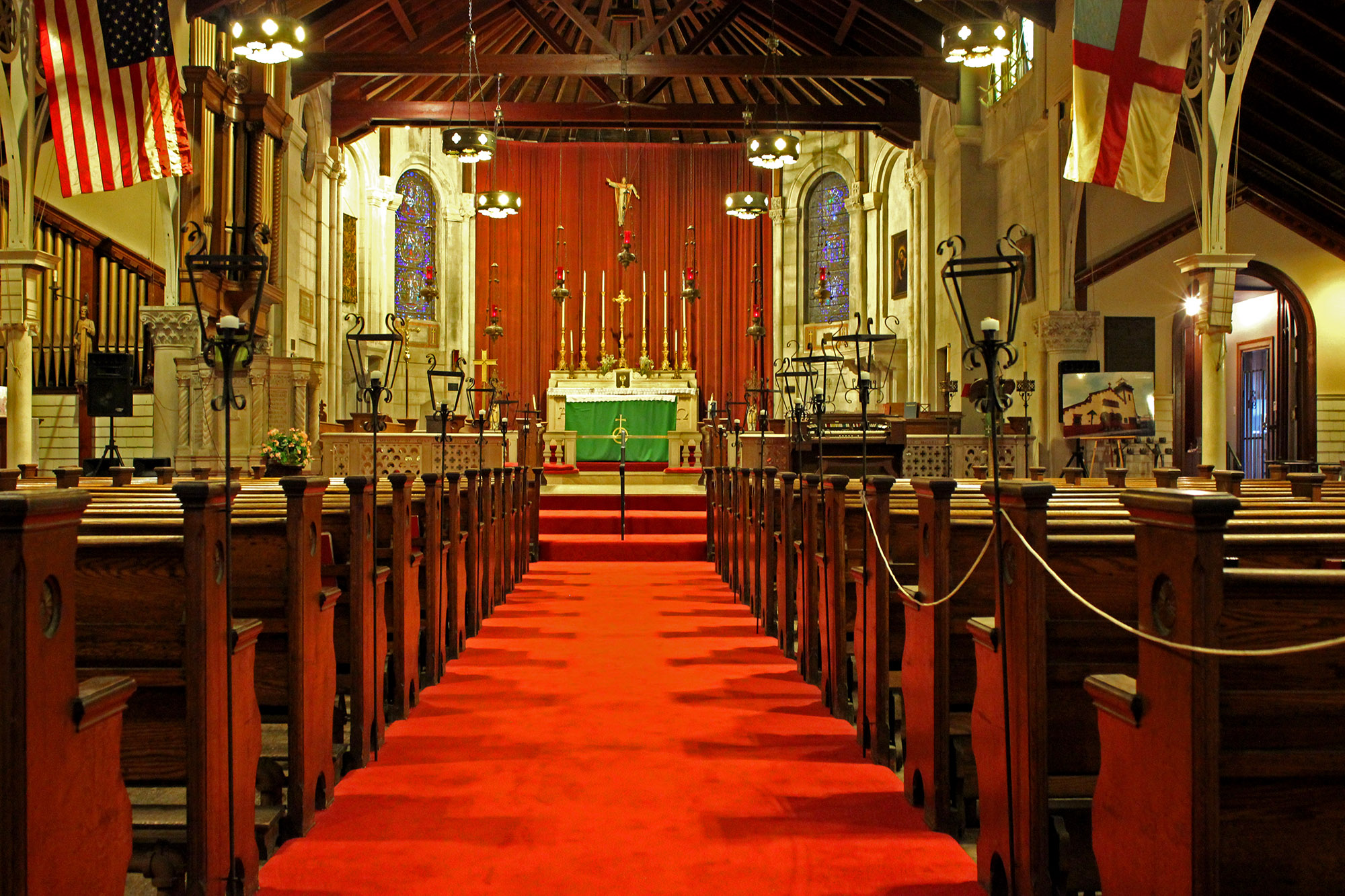

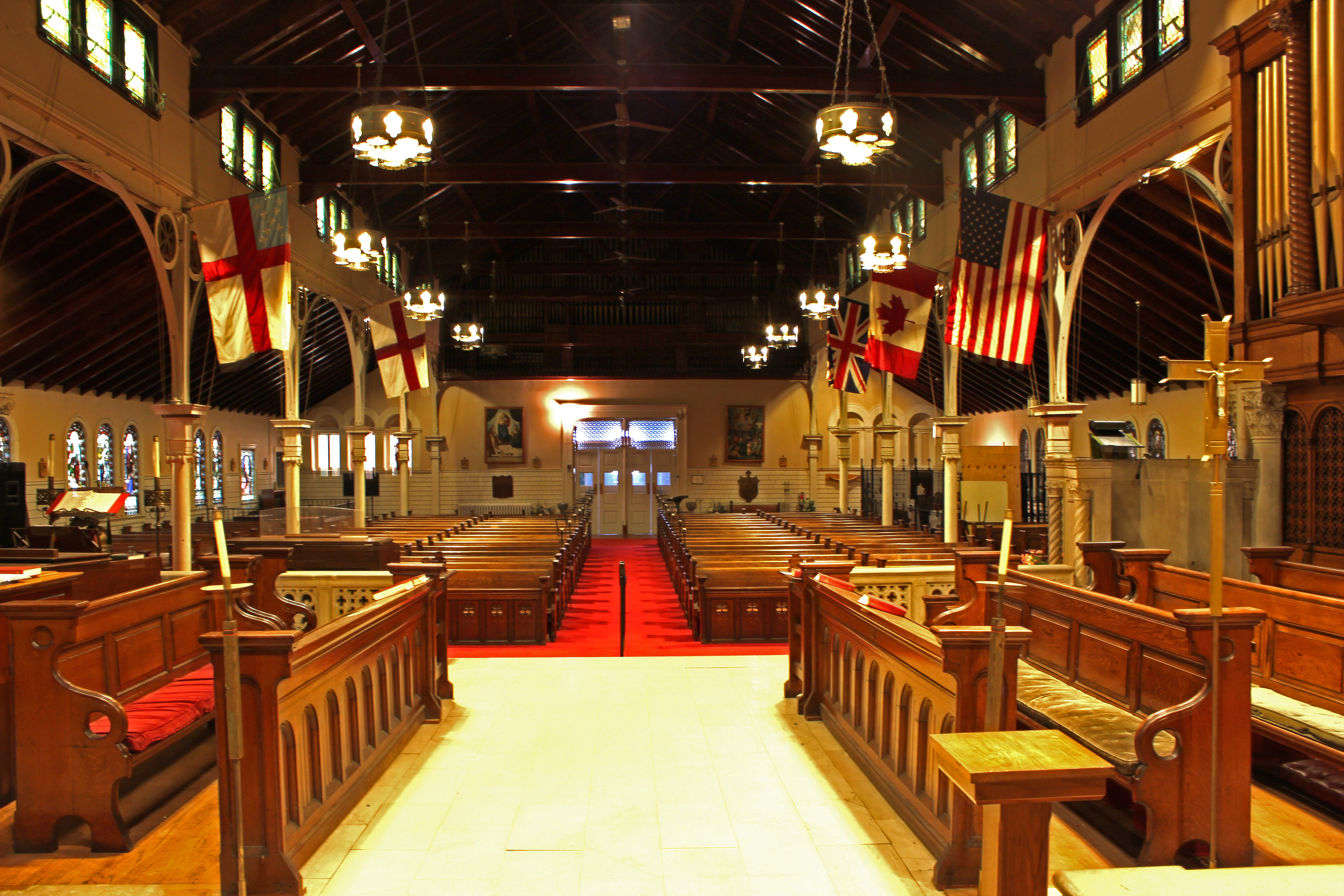

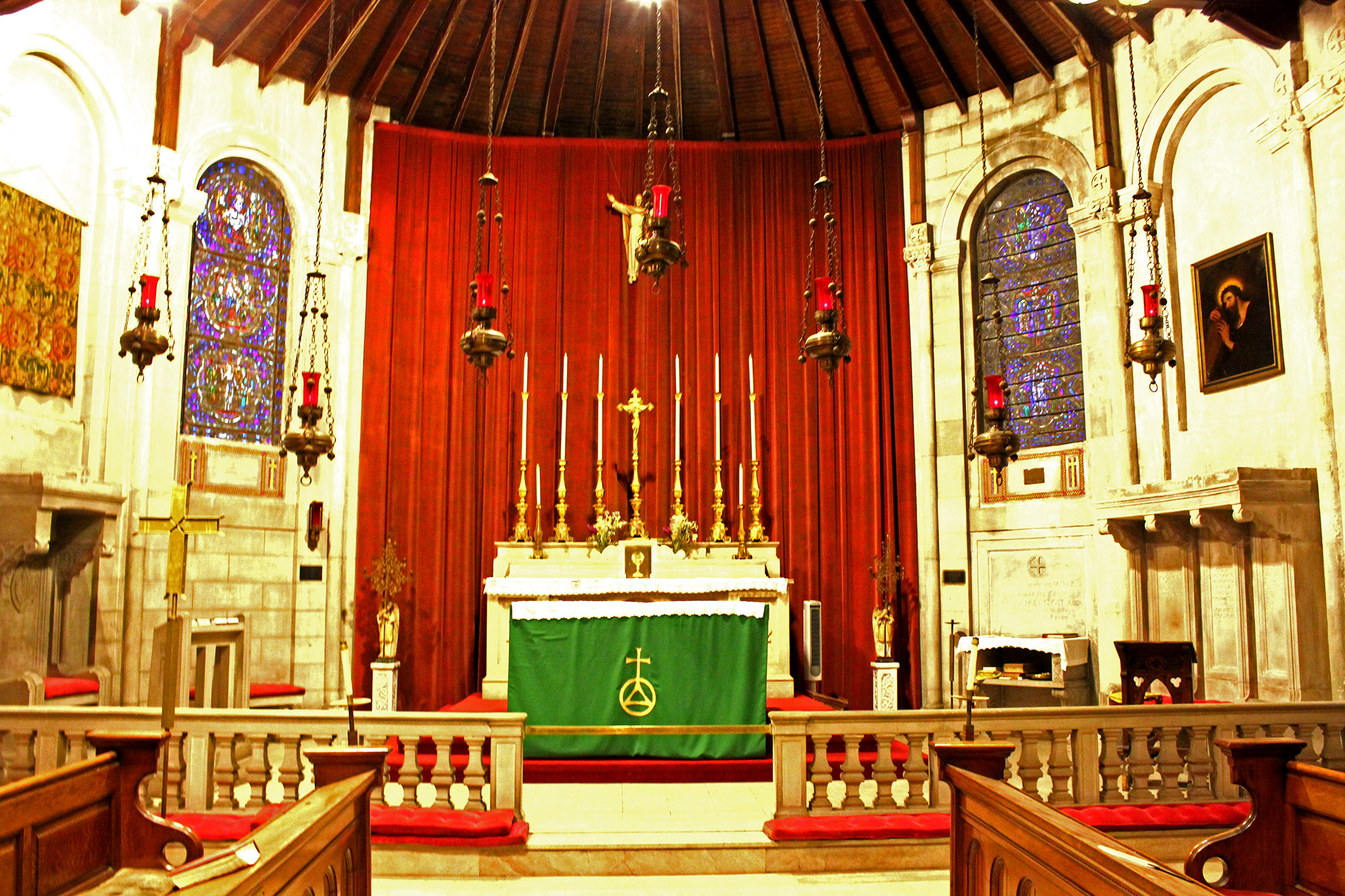

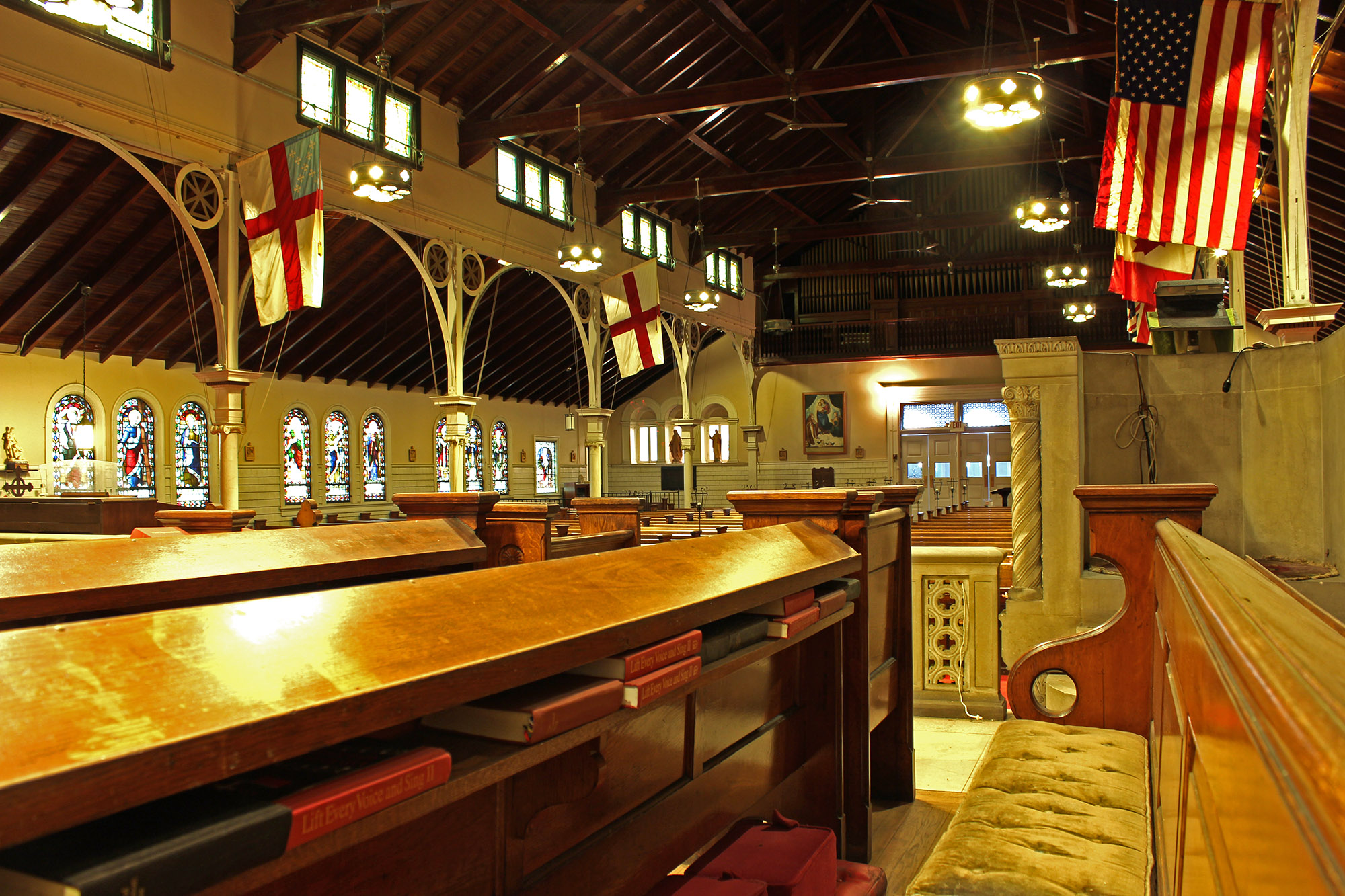

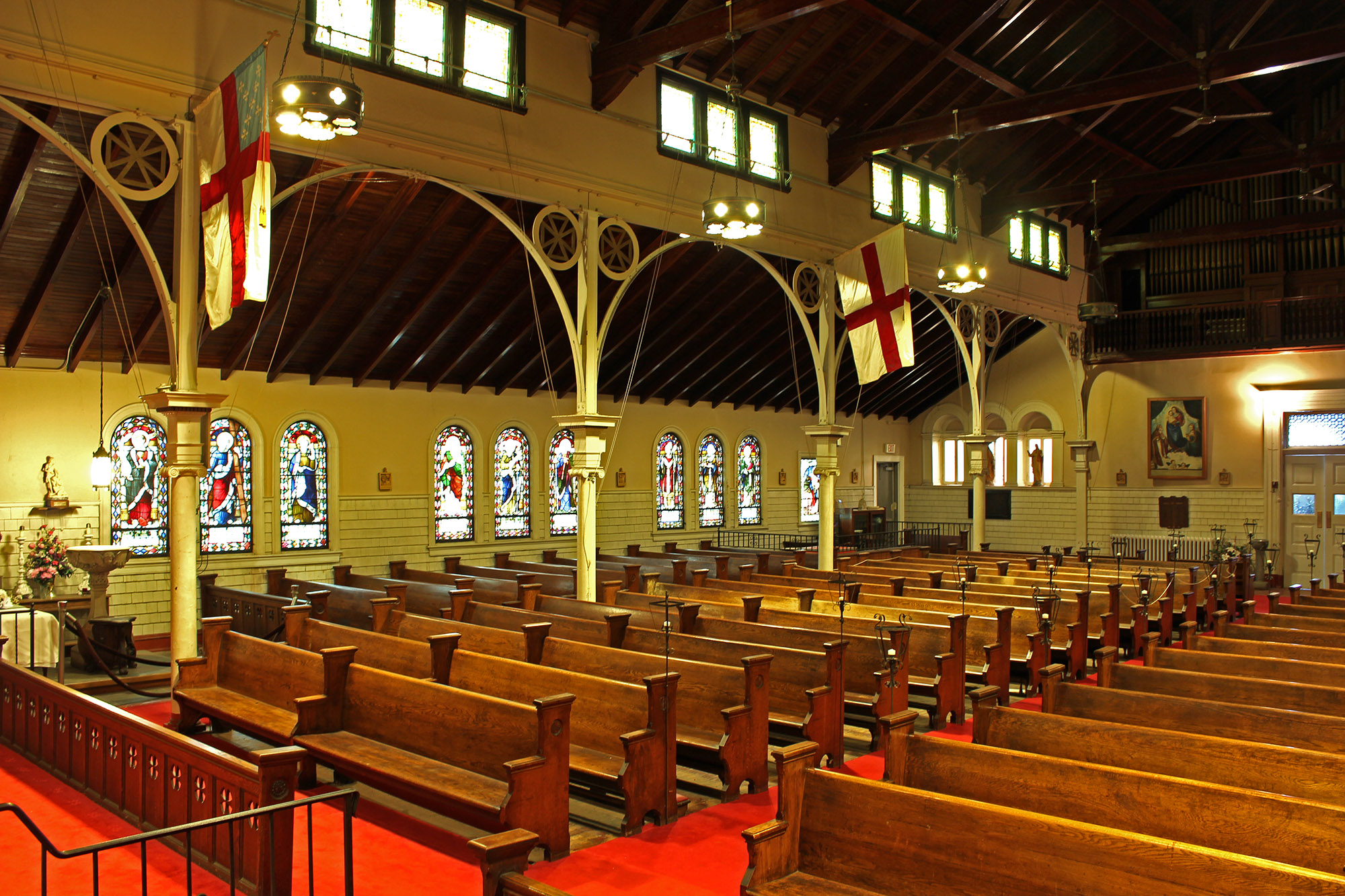

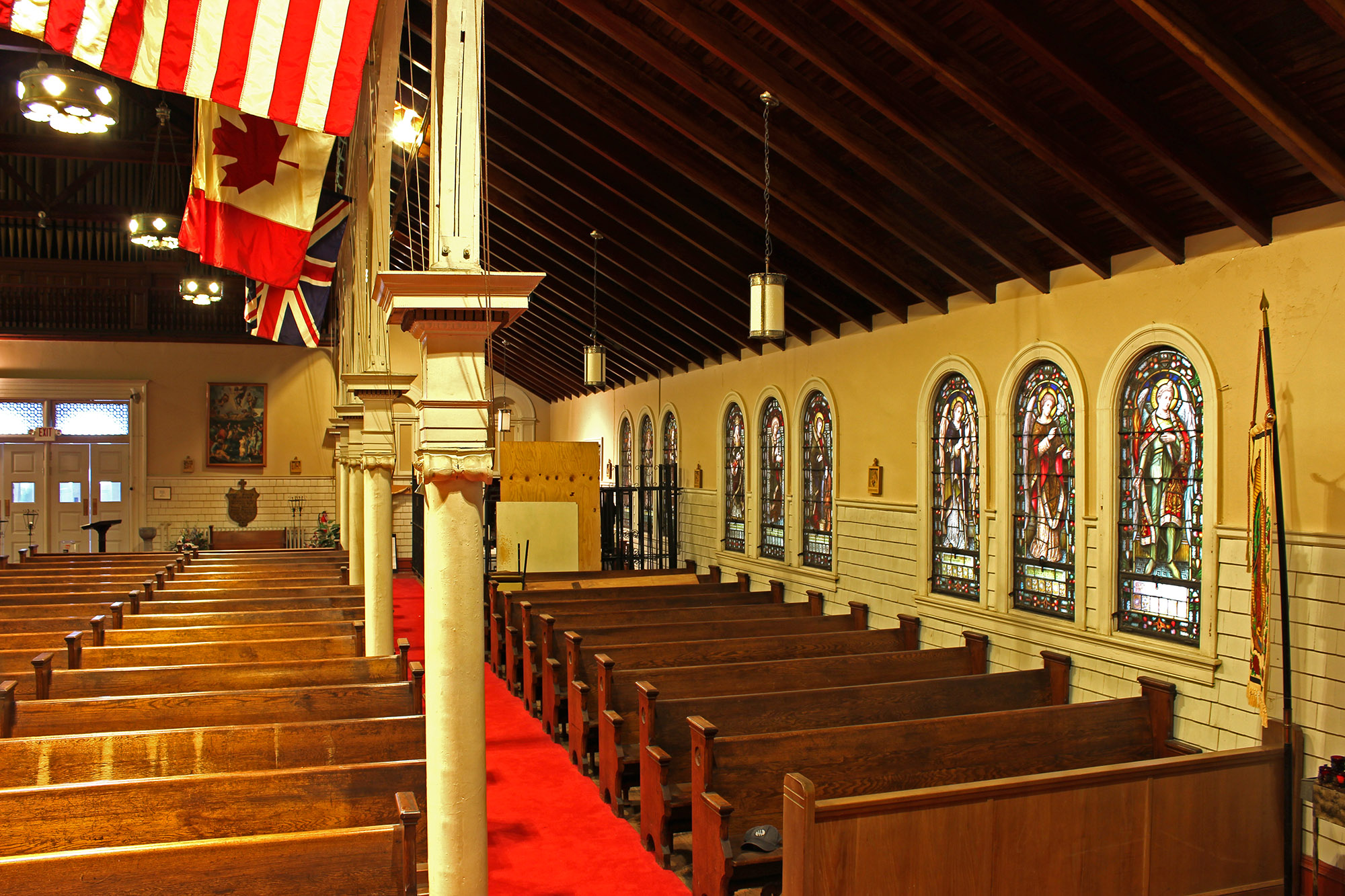

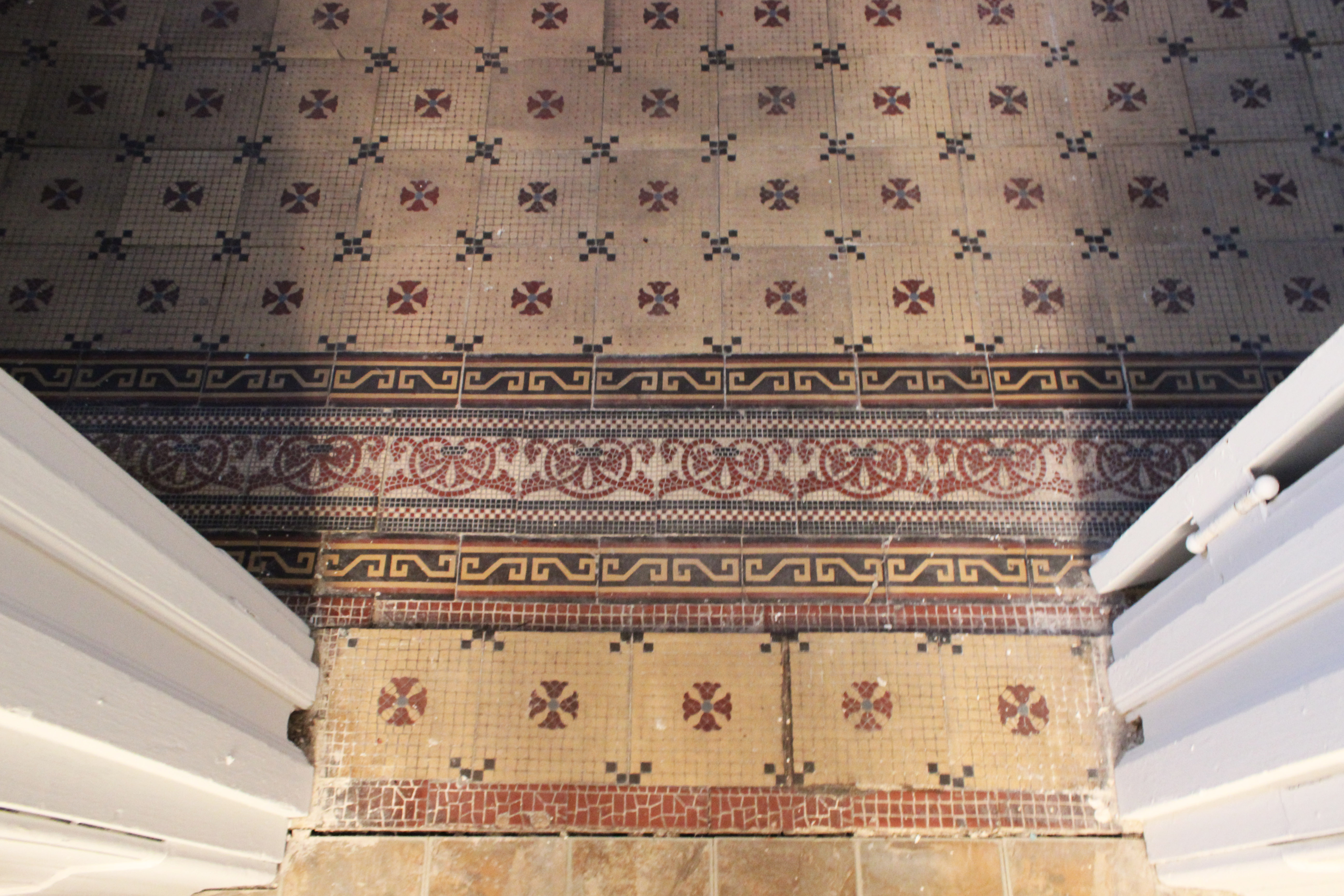

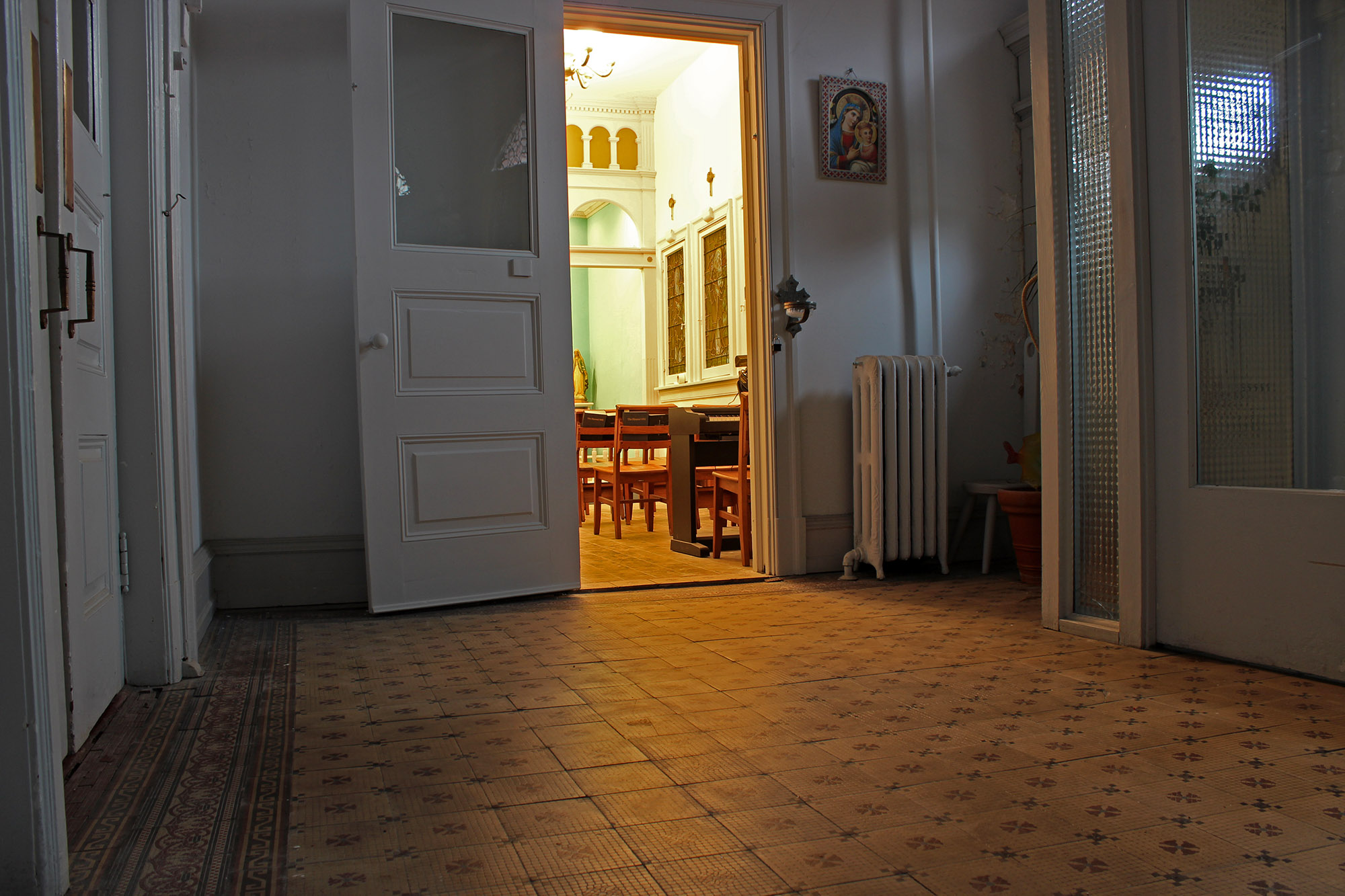

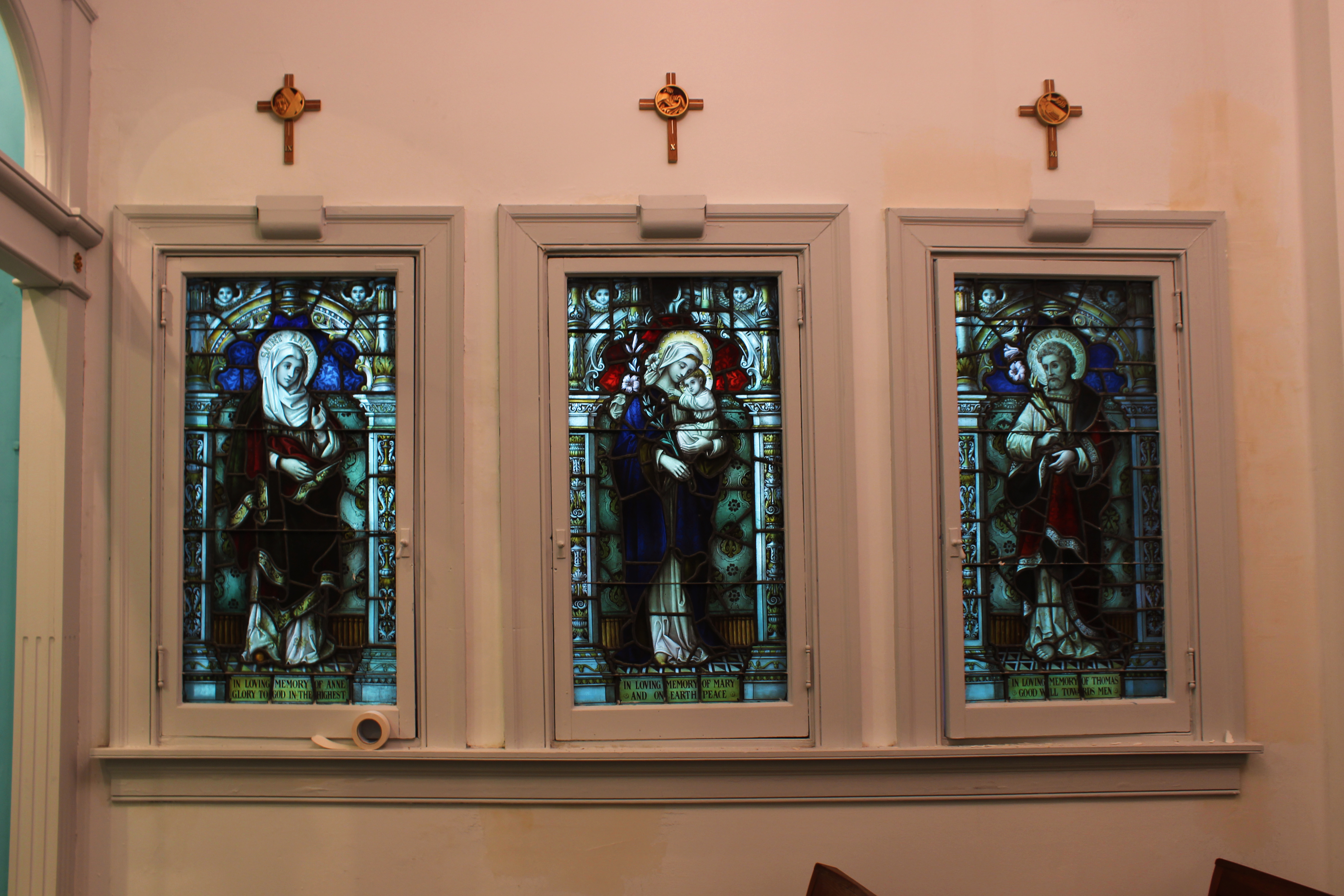

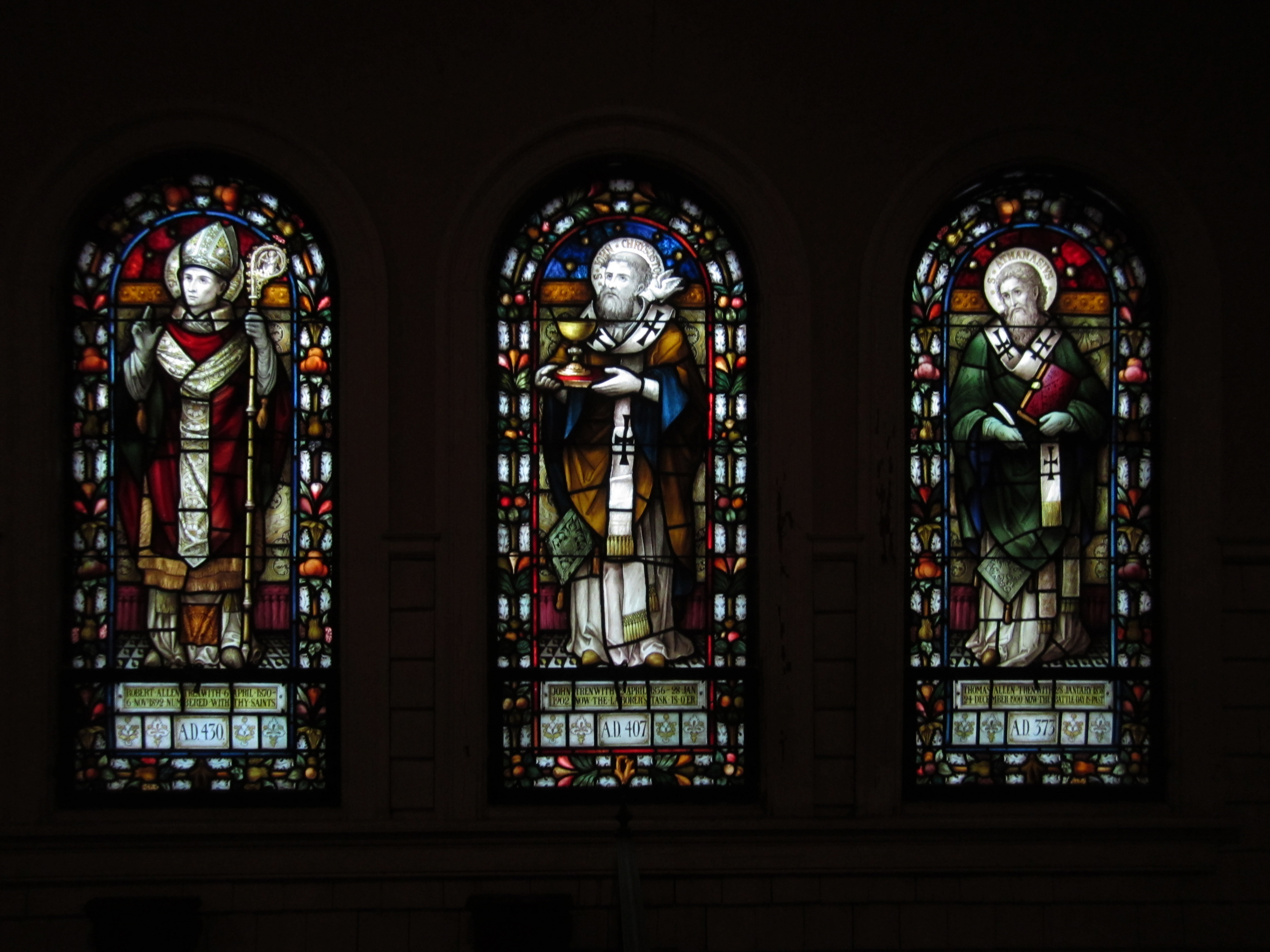

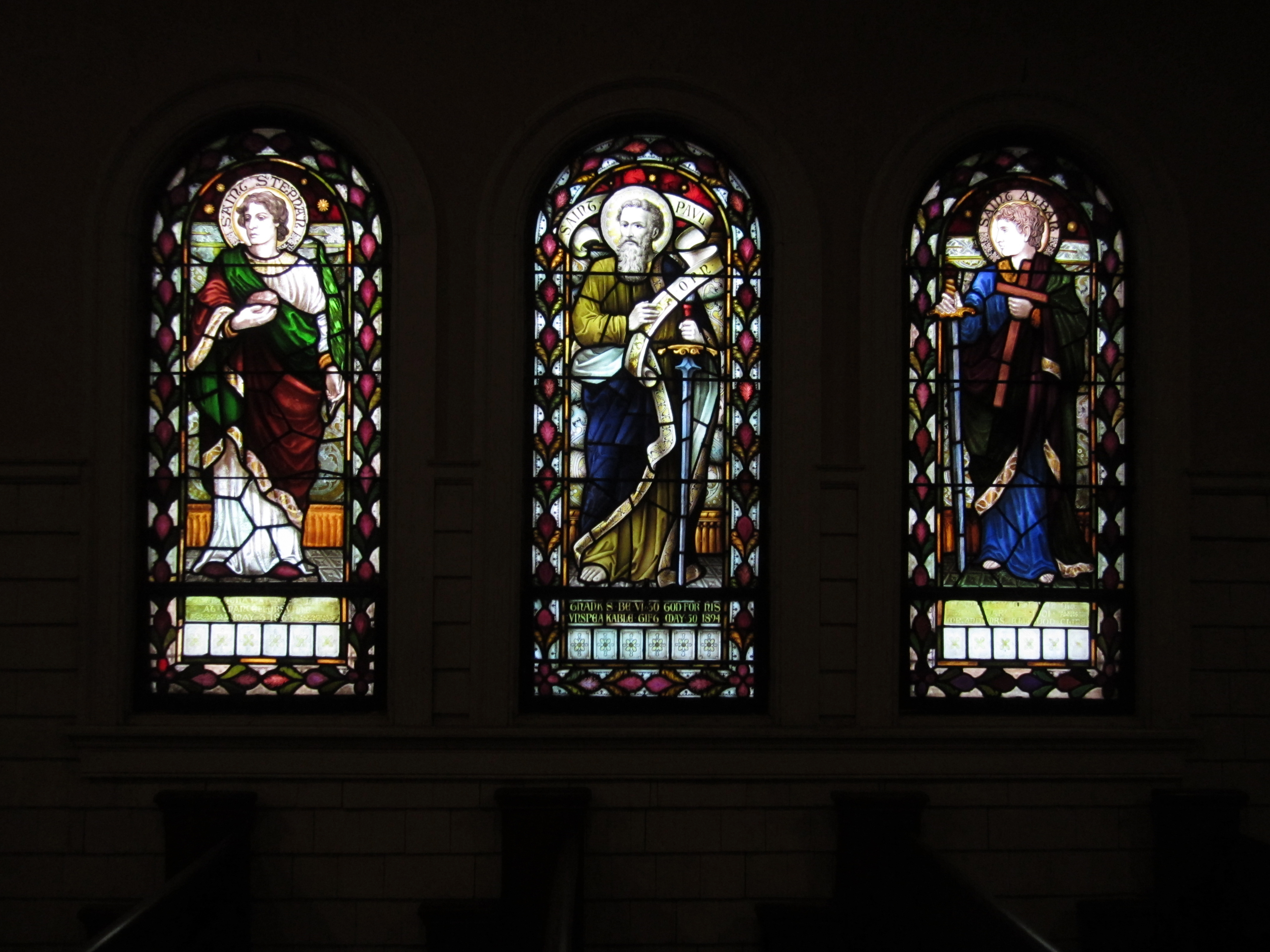

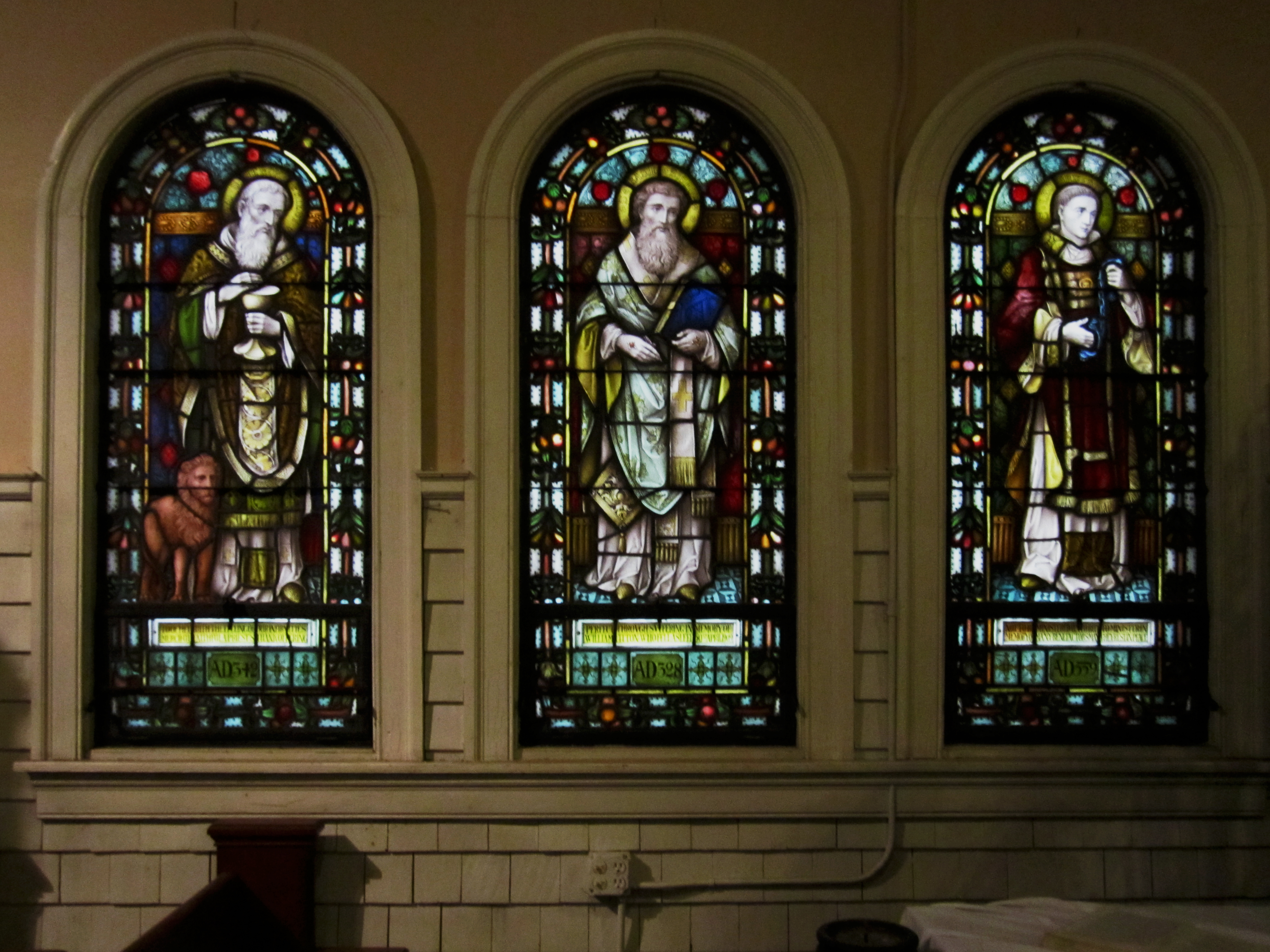

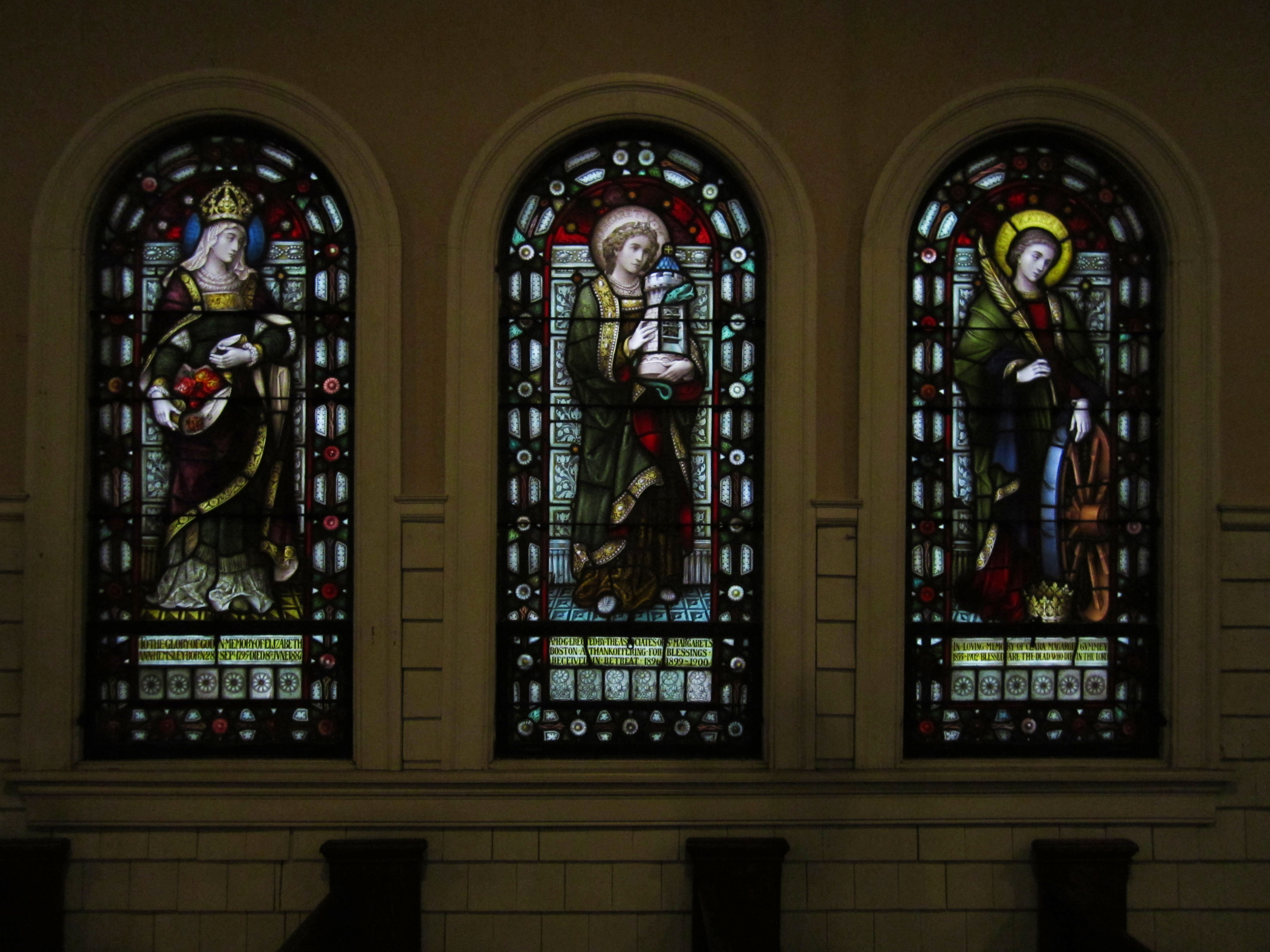

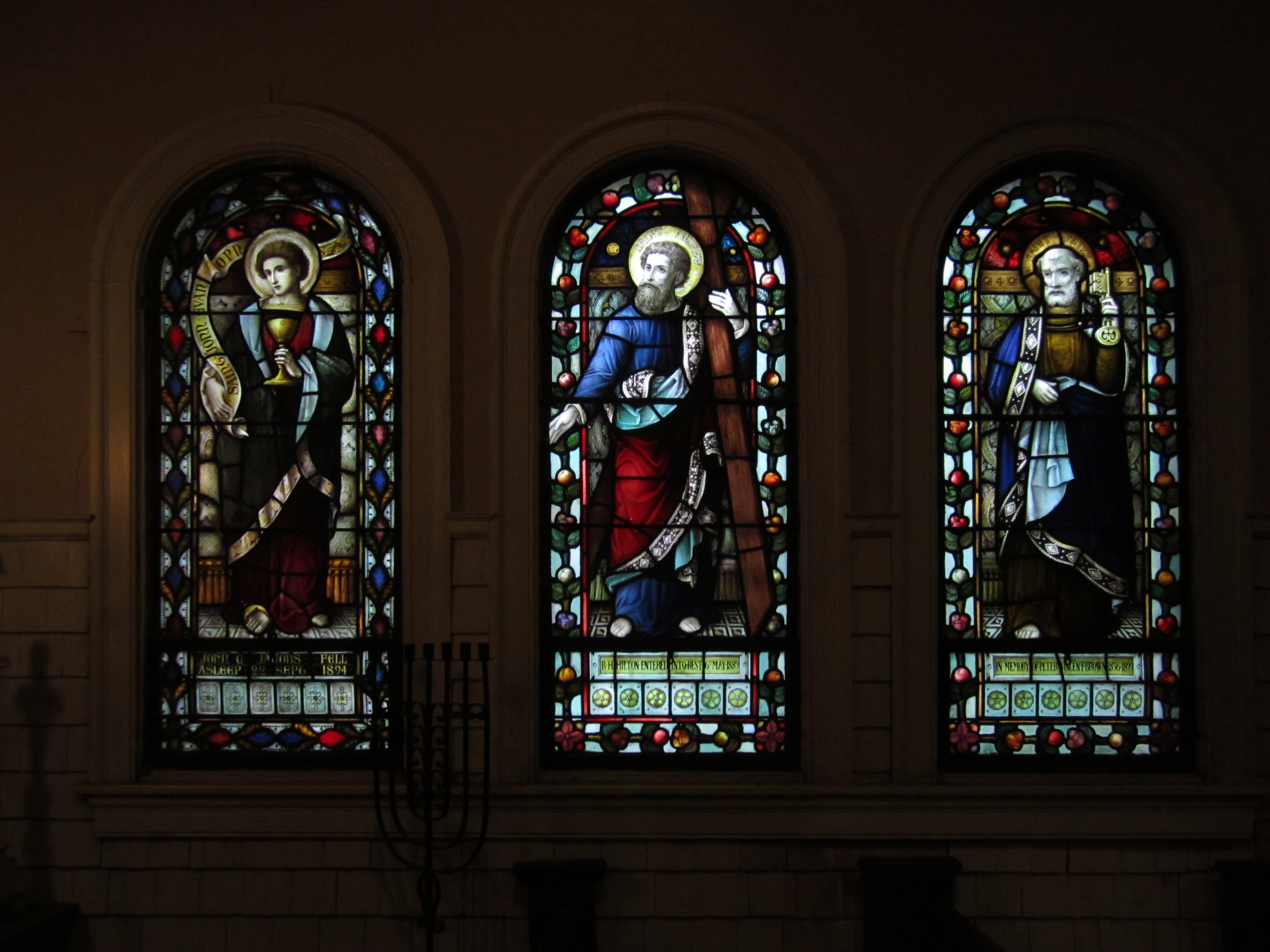

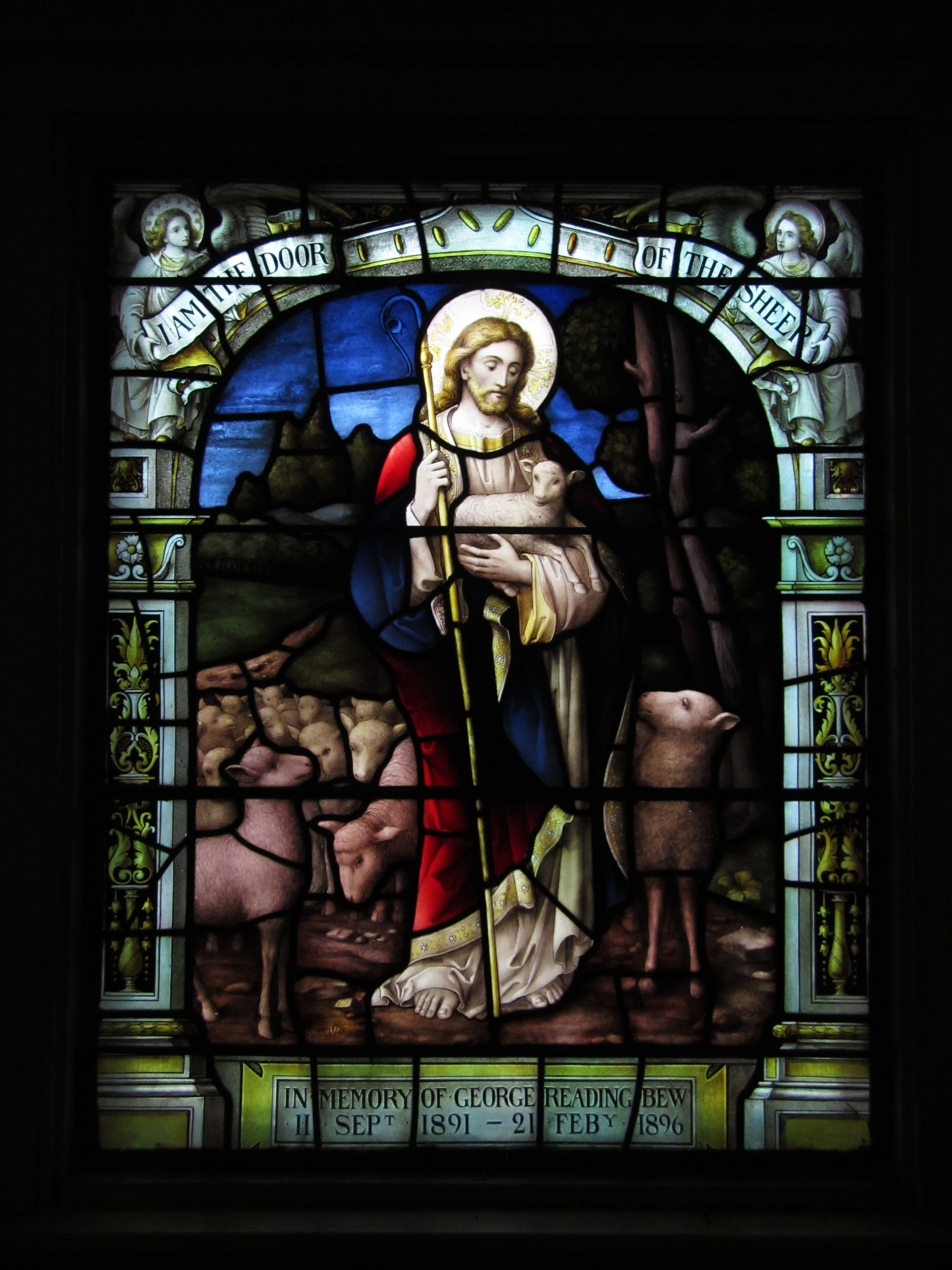

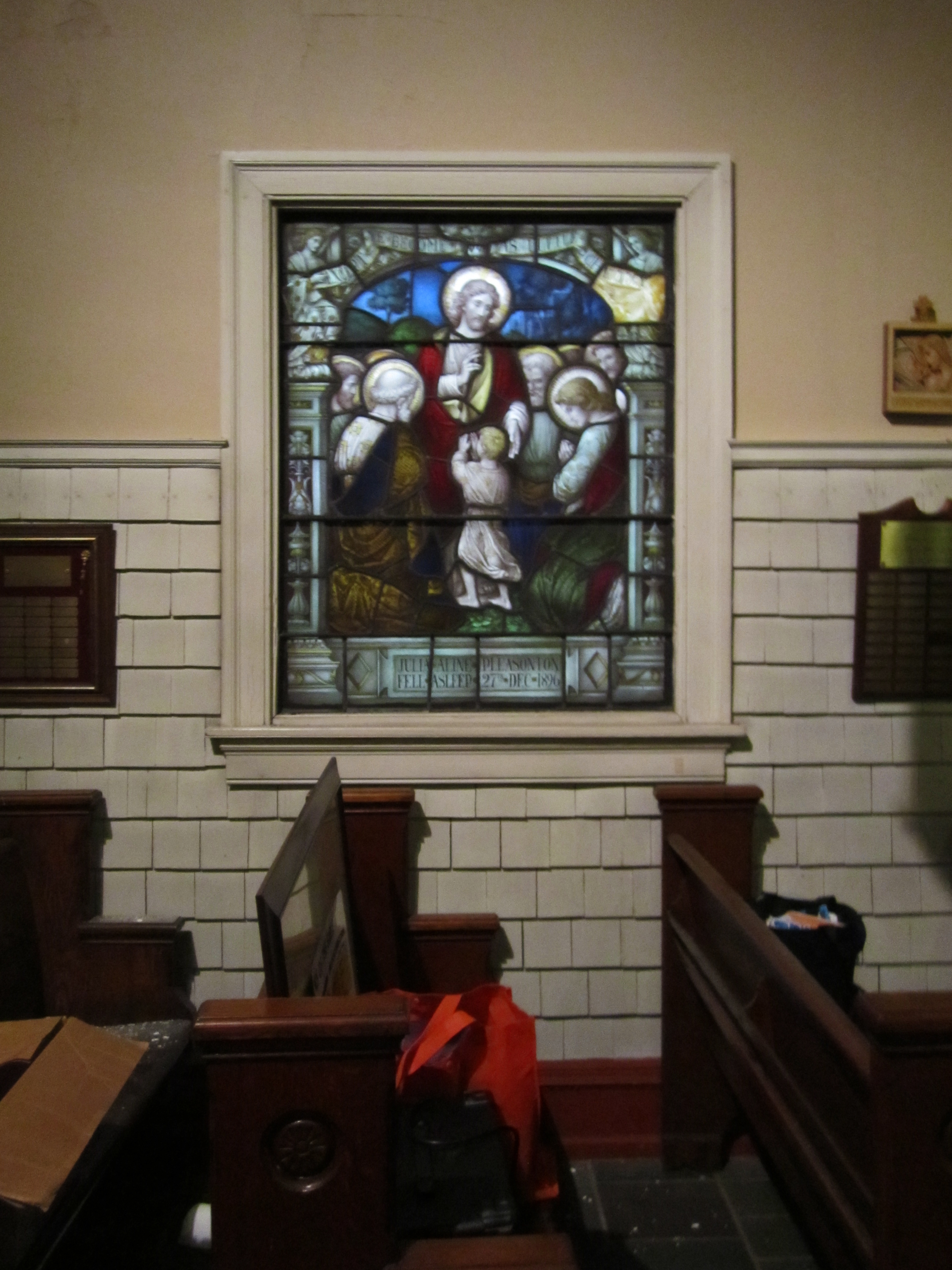

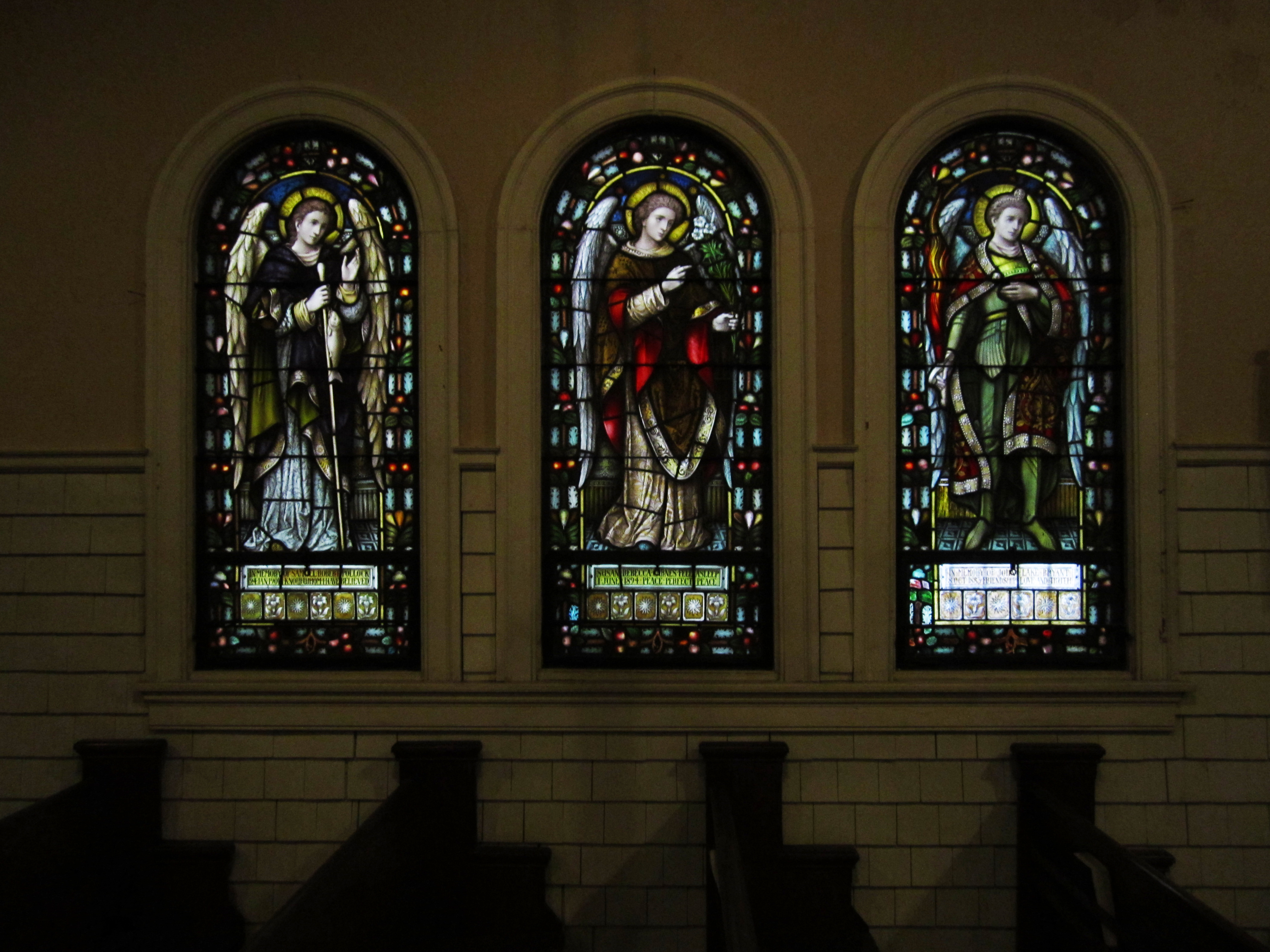

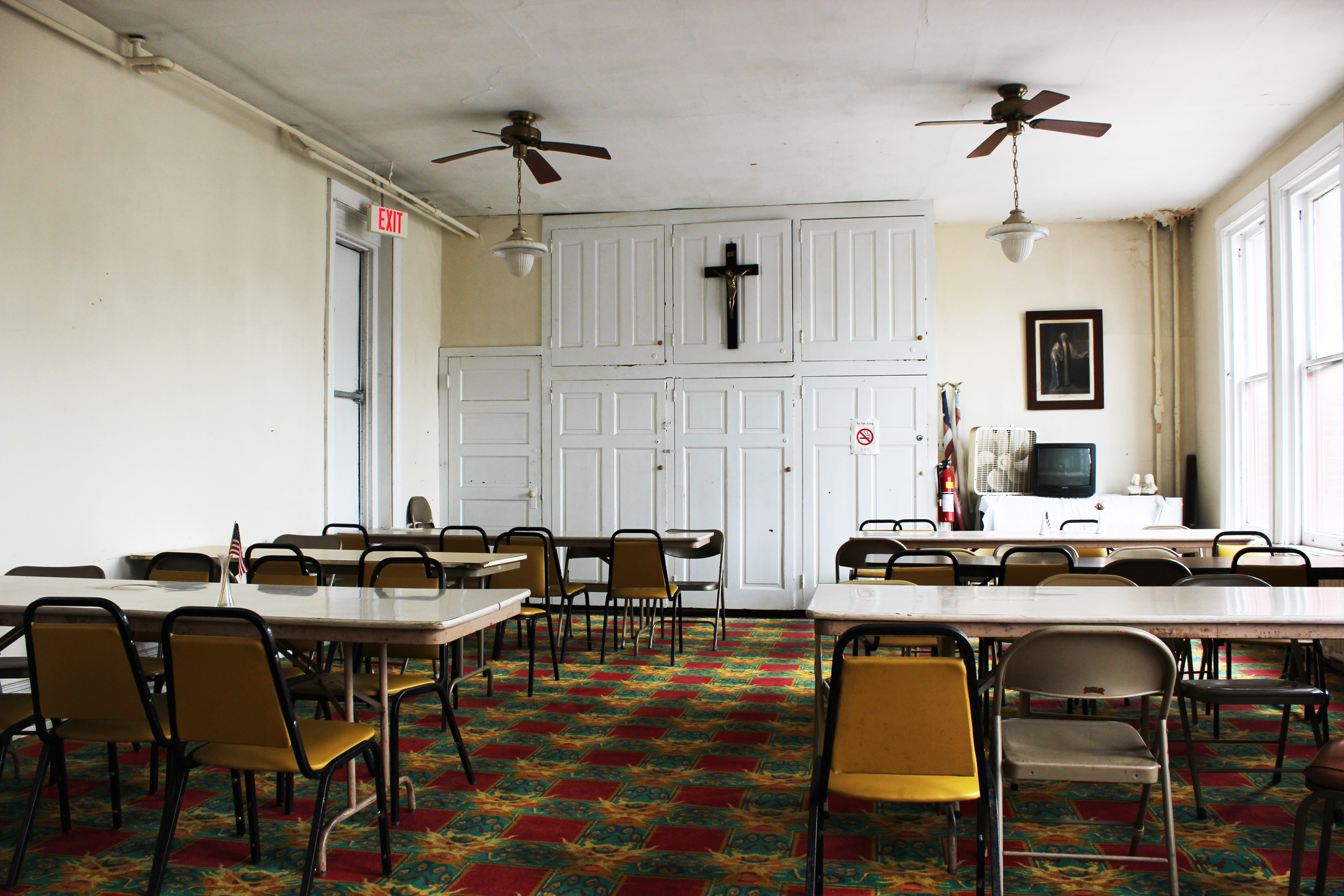

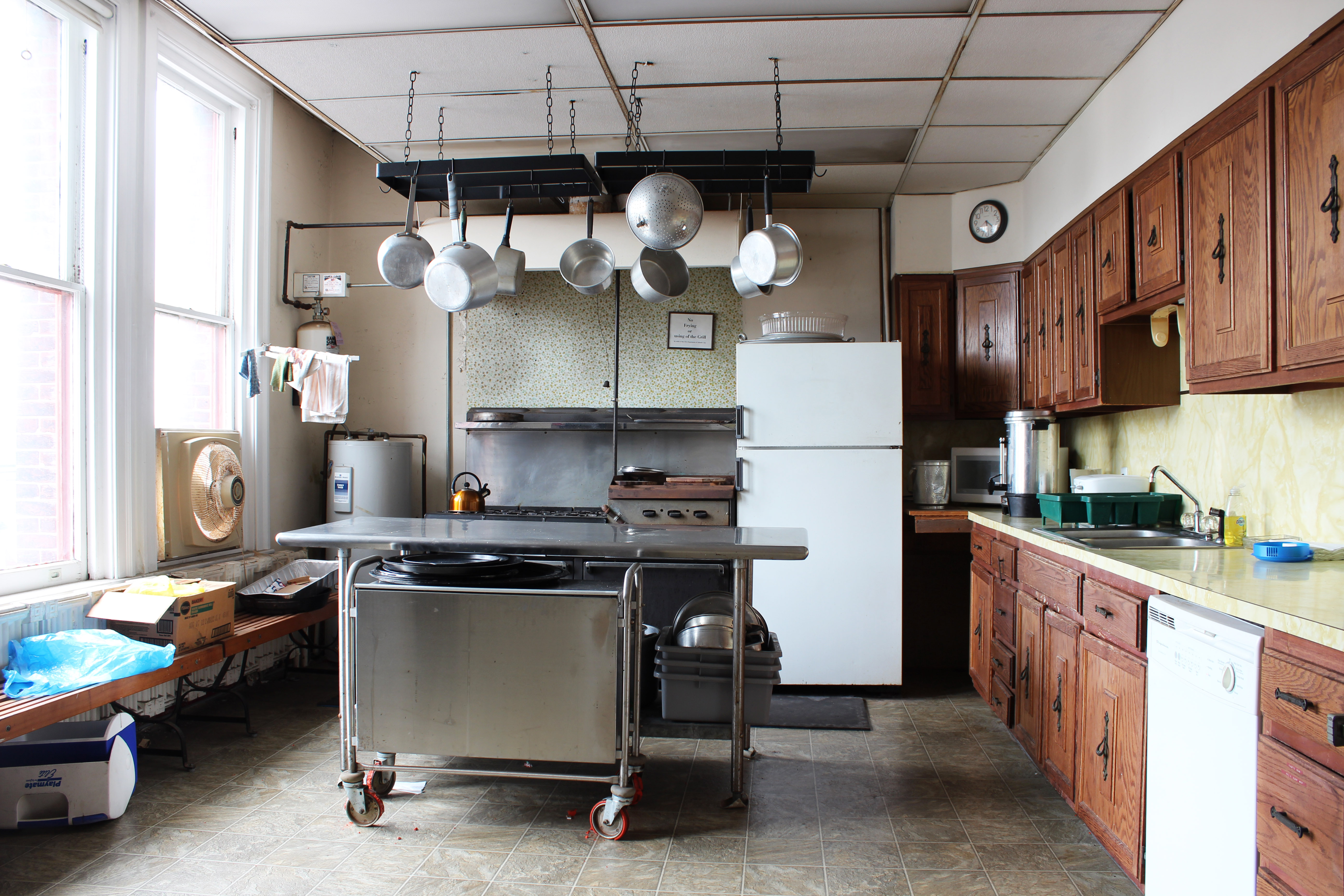

== See also ==
- National Register of Historic Places listings in Atlantic County, New Jersey
