= Liberty Hotel (Atlantic City, New Jersey) =

Historic building in New Jersey, US

- U.S. National Register of Historic Places
- New Jersey Register of Historic Places
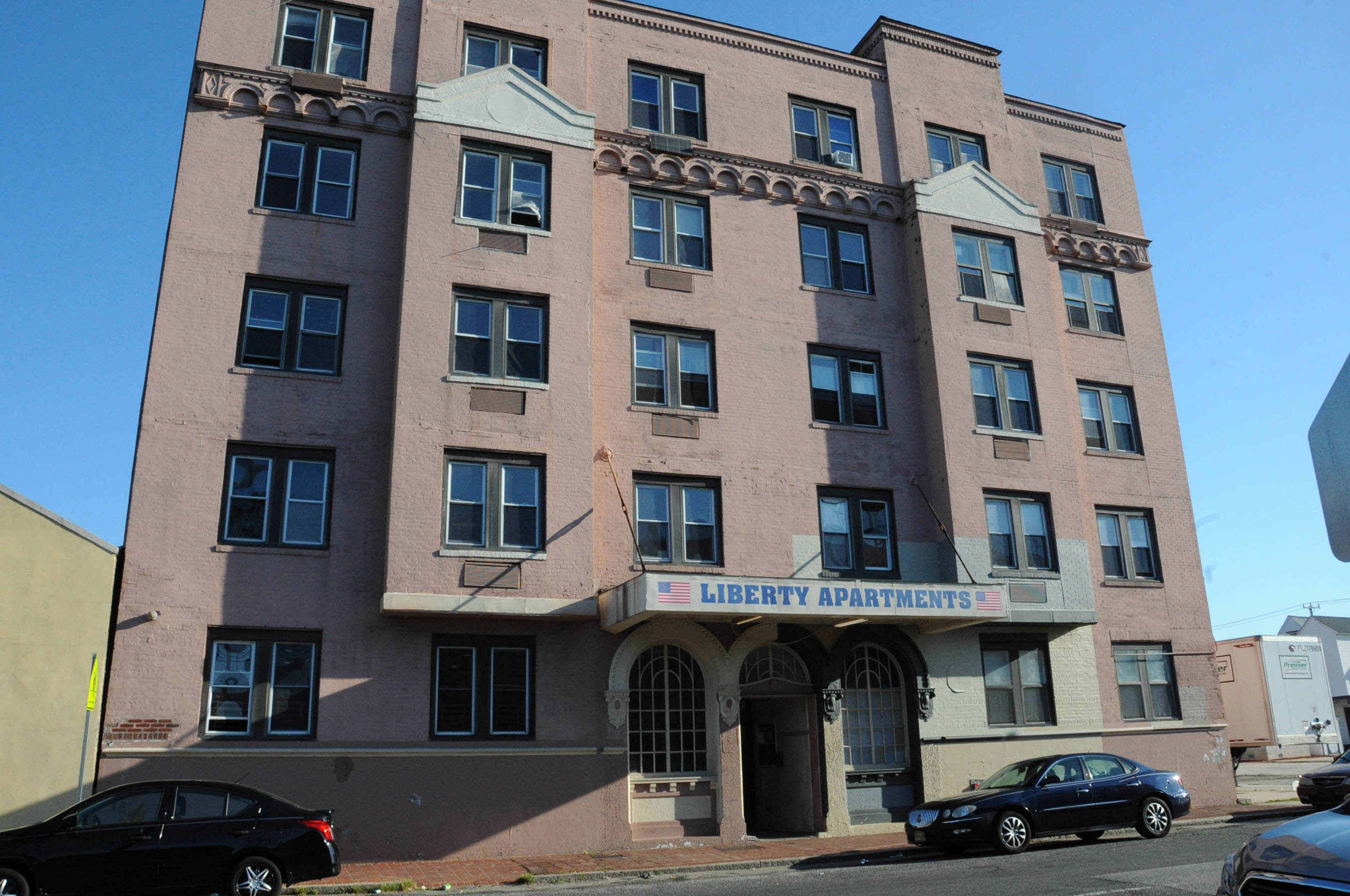

- Location within Atlantic County, New Jersey Location within New Jersey Location within the United States
- Location: 1519 Baltic Avenue, Atlantic City, New Jersey
- Coordinates: 39°21′51.5″N 74°25′55.5″W
- Built: 1928
- NRHP reference No.: 100005102
- NJRHP No.: 5696

Significant dates
- Added to NRHP: March 23, 2020
- Designated NJRHP: January 15, 2020

Liberty Hotel is a former hotel located at 1519 Baltic Avenue in Atlantic City, New Jersey that was open to African Americans. Now known as the Liberty Apartment Hotel, it was listed on the National Register of Historic Places on March 23, 2020, for its significance in ethnic heritage and entertainment/recreation. It was listed in The Negro Motorist Green Book as a business that did not discriminate against African Americans.

Built in 1928 in the Northside neighborhood, the five-story brick building is Italian Renaissance Revival in style. It served food and offered entertainment. It had prominent customers.

It was acquired in 2019 as part of an affordable housing redevelopment project. It is now an apartment building for seniors.

== See also ==
- African American resorts
- National Register of Historic Places listings in Atlantic County, New Jersey
