= Samuel Richards =

Samuel or Sam Richards may refer to:

- Samuel Richards (captain), American Revolutionary war captain in the 1st New Hampshire regiment
- Samuel W. Richards (1824–1909), religious and political leader in Utah
- Samuel Richards (swimmer), long-distance swimmer
- Samuel Richards (priest) (born 1955), Dean of Trinidad
- Sam Richards (writer) (born 1949), English writer, composer and musician
- Samuel Richards (serial killer) (born 1856), name attributed to Nebraska serial killer Stephen Dee Richards
- Samuel Richards (ironmaster) (1769-1842) American ironmaster, heavily involved in New Jersey iron production
- Sam Richards (sociologist) (born 1960), American sociologist

== See also ==
- Samuel Richards Hotel, in the Mays Landing section of Hamilton Township, New Jersey
- Samantha Richards (born 1983), Australian basketball player
