= Mizpah, New Jersey =

Populated place in Atlantic County, New Jersey, US

- Census-designated place
- Location in Atlantic County Location in New Jersey Location in the United States
- Coordinates: 39°29′12″N 74°50′09″W
- Country: United States
- State: New Jersey
- County: Atlantic
- Township: Hamilton

Area
  - Total: 1.63 sq mi (4.23 km^{2})
  - Land: 1.63 sq mi (4.23 km^{2})
  - Water: 0 sq mi (0.00 km^{2})
- Elevation: 92 ft (28 m)

Population (2020)
  - Total: 479
  - Density: 293.6/sq mi (113.37/km^{2})
- Time zone: UTC−05:00 (Eastern (EST))
  - Summer (DST): UTC−04:00 (EDT)
- ZIP Code: 08342
- FIPS code: 34-46980
- GNIS feature ID: 878423

Mizpah is an unincorporated community and census-designated place (CDP) located within the Mays Landing section of Hamilton Township, in Atlantic County, in the U.S. state of New Jersey. As of the 2020 census, Mizpah had a population of 479.

Mizpah was established as a Jewish colony in southern New Jersey and was planned out by a New York firm of cloak makers. It originally had a factory, 30 houses, and about 100 settlers.

Uncle Dewey's is a popular barbecue stand located in Mizpah, along U.S. Route 40.

== Demographics ==
Historical population
Census	Pop.	Note	%±
2020	479		—
U.S. Decennial Census; 2020

Mizpah was first listed as a census designated place in the 2020 U.S. census.

Mizpah CDP, New Jersey – Racial and ethnic composition Note: the US Census treats Hispanic/Latino as an ethnic category. This table excludes Latinos from the racial categories and assigns them to a separate category. Hispanics/Latinos may be of any race.
Race / Ethnicity (NH = Non-Hispanic)	Pop 2020	2020
White alone (NH)	267	55.74%
Black or African American alone (NH)	88	18.37%
Native American or Alaska Native alone (NH)	0	0.00%
Asian alone (NH)	3	0.63%
Native Hawaiian or Pacific Islander alone (NH)	0	0.00%
Other race alone (NH)	2	0.42%
Mixed race or Multiracial (NH)	21	4.38%
Hispanic or Latino (any race)	98	20.46%
Total	479	100.00%

As of 2020, the population was 479.

== Education ==
The CDP is within two school districts: Hamilton Township School District (elementary) and Greater Egg Harbor Regional High School District. The zoned high school for Hamilton Township is Oakcrest High School, which is a part of the Greater Egg Harbor district.

== Notable people ==
People who were born in, residents of, or otherwise closely associated with Hamilton Township include:

- Shameka Marshall (born 1983), long jumper who won the gold medal at the 2007 NACAC Championships in Athletics.
