= Cheryl Hamilton =

American gymnastics judge

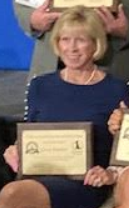
- Hamilton in 2024
- Born: 1949 or 1950 (age 75–76)
- Education: Fairmont State College
- Occupation: Gymnastics judge
- Years active: 1977–present

Cheryl Hamilton (born 1949 or 1950) is an American gymnastics judge. A judge since 1977, she has been selected to officiate at five Olympic Games.

== Early life ==
Hamilton attended Oakcrest High School in Mays Landing, New Jersey, where she competed in gymnastics. She continued her gymnastics career while attending Fairmont State College in West Virginia. She later described herself as an "average gymnast".

== Career ==
Hamilton moved to Delaware from New Jersey and became a gymnastics coach and teacher in 1973. She worked at the First State School of Gymnastics in Prices Corner and later bought out the business in 1978, turning it into "one of the state's most successful amateur groups". She sold the business in 1988 to concentrate on judging.

Hamilton became a judge in 1977, taking a test to get a regional rating and passing a test later in the year (on which she earned the highest score possible) that made her a national official. Soon after, she became the Delaware State Judging Director, a position she served in for 10 years, and became regional technical chair for the Mid-Atlantic Gymnastics Directors Association. Hamilton volunteered as an assistant judge for the 1979 World Artistic Gymnastics Championships and passed a test in 1980 deeming her an elite-rank gymnastics judge.

In 1984, Hamilton was promoted to being a Brevet-ranked official, making her one of the top-15 judges in the United States. Since then, she has officiated at numerous high-level events and has been regarded as one of the top judges in the world. She was a judging assistant at the 1984 Summer Olympics and then was the U.S.'s appointed judge at the 1996 Summer Olympics, 2012 Summer Olympics, 2016 Summer Olympics, 2020 Summer Olympics, and she has been chosen for the 2024 Summer Olympics. Hamilton has been an official at many World Championships, traveled to over 20 countries to judge, served at numerous National Collegiate Athletic Association (NCAA) championships, and judged at many regional and local events.

Hamilton has served as the national technical committee chair with USA Gymnastics for 30 years. She has been a top contributor to the Code of Points rule book used by gymnastics officials in the United States and was given two Gold Standard for Judging Awards by the International Gymnastics Federation of Judges, "for unbiased and technical excellence". She was inducted into the National Association of Women's Gymnastics Judges Hall of Fame in 2019, and was selected for induction to the Delaware Sports Museum and Hall of Fame in 2024.
