= Mays Landing Presbyterian Church =

Historic church in New Jersey, US

- U.S. National Register of Historic Places
- U.S. Historic district – Contributing property
- New Jersey Register of Historic Places
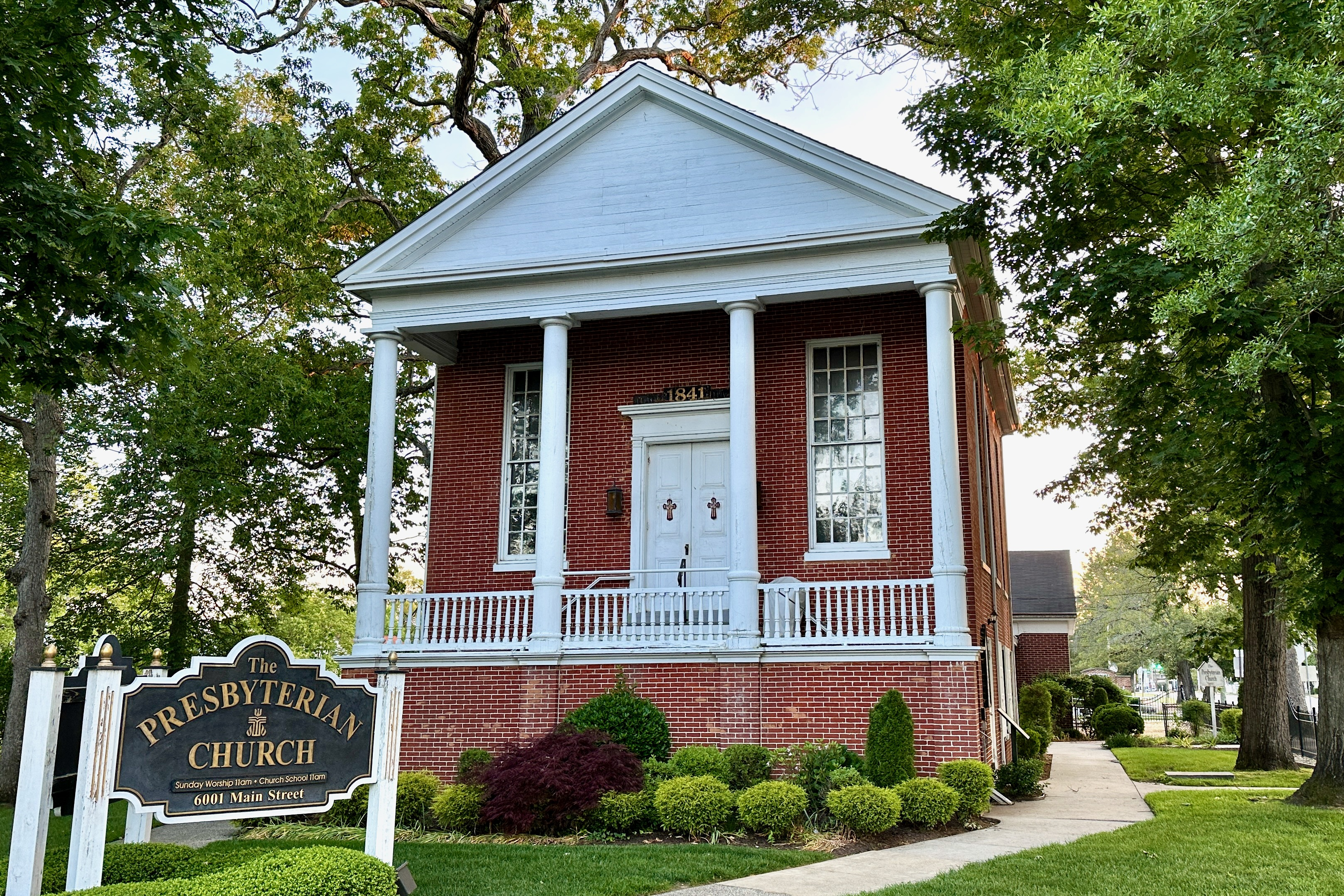

- Location within Atlantic County, New Jersey Location within New Jersey Location within the United States
- Location: Main Street and Cape May Avenue, Mays Landing, New Jersey
- Coordinates: 39°27′9″N 74°43′40″W
- Built: 1841
- Architectural style: Vernacular Neo-Classical
- Part of: Mays Landing Historic District (ID90001245)
- NRHP reference No.: 82003261
- NJRHP No.: 339

Significant dates
- Added to NRHP: April 20, 1982
- Designated CP: August 23, 1990
- Designated NJRHP: April 21, 1981

Mays Landing Presbyterian Church is a historic church built in 1841 and located at Main Street and Cape May Avenue in the Mays Landing section of Hamilton Township in Atlantic County, New Jersey, United States. It was documented by the Historic American Buildings Survey (HABS) in 1938 and was added to the National Register of Historic Places on April 20, 1982, for its significance in architecture and religion. The church was added as a contributing property to the Mays Landing Historic District in 1990.

== History and description ==
The church is a brick building using Flemish bond and designed using Greek Revival architecture. The front portico features Doric columns. The land was donated to the church by Samuel Richards, who owned the Weymouth Iron Furnace. The Reverend Allen H. Brown served as pastor 1846–1854 and 1862–1872.

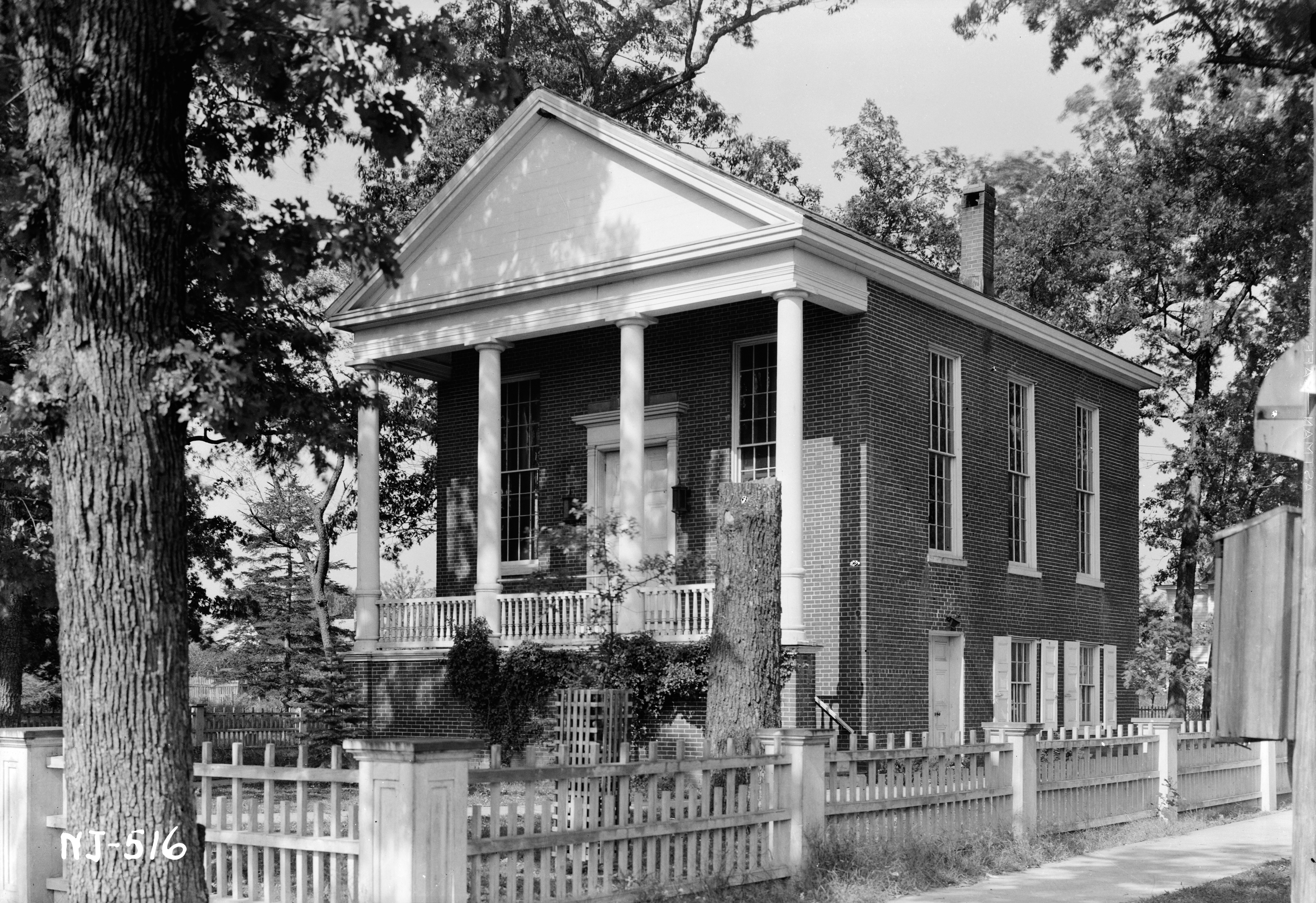
HABS photo from 1938

== See also ==
- National Register of Historic Places listings in Atlantic County, New Jersey
- List of Presbyterian churches in New Jersey
