= Cory Bird =

American football player (born 1978)

No. 41
- Position: Defensive back

Personal information
- Born: August 10, 1978 (age 48); Atlantic City, New Jersey, U.S.
- Listed height: 5 ft 10 in (1.78 m)
- Listed weight: 213 lb (97 kg)

Career information
- High school: Oakcrest (NJ)
- College: Virginia Tech (2000)
- NFL draft: 2001: 3rd round, 91st overall pick

Career history
- Indianapolis Colts (2001–2004)

Career NFL statistics
- Tackles: 114
- Sacks: 0.5
- Passes defended: 1
- Stats at Pro Football Reference

Cory James Bird (born August 10, 1978) is an American former professional football player who was a safety in the National Football League (NFL) for the Indianapolis Colts from 2001 to 2004. Bird played college football at Virginia Tech and was selected in the third round of the 2001 NFL draft.

Bird was known for his ability to make open field tackles in crucial situations. At Virginia Tech, Bird was a three-time winner of the best conditioned athlete award, though his professional career was cut short with injuries. He attended Oakcrest High School in Hamilton Township, Atlantic County, New Jersey, where he was a standout wide receiver and wrestler. He lives with his wife and four children in Atlantic County, New Jersey.

Bird also is partial owner of Bird Electric in Mays Landing, New Jersey and former owner of a barbershop known as the "41 Spot".

== NFL career statistics ==
Legend
**Bold**	Career high

=== Regular season ===
Year	Team	Games		Tackles					Interceptions					Fumbles			
Year	Team	GP	GS	Cmb	Solo	Ast	Sck	TFL	Int	Yds	TD	Lng	PD	FF	FR	Yds	TD
2001	IND	**14**	0	32	27	5	**0.5**	0	0	0	0	0	**1**	0	0	0	0
2002	IND	6	**4**	17	11	6	0.0	**1**	0	0	0	0	0	0	0	0	0
2003	IND	12	0	20	17	3	0.0	0	0	0	0	0	0	**1**	0	0	0
2004	IND	13	**4**	**45**	**35**	**10**	0.0	0	0	0	0	0	0	0	0	0	0
Career		45	8	114	90	24	0.5	1	0	0	0	0	1	1	0	0	0

=== Playoffs ===
Year	Team	Games		Tackles					Interceptions					Fumbles			
Year	Team	GP	GS	Cmb	Solo	Ast	Sck	TFL	Int	Yds	TD	Lng	PD	FF	FR	Yds	TD
2001	IND	**3**	0	**6**	**6**	0	0.0	0	0	0	0	0	0	0	0	0	0
2004	IND	2	0	3	2	**1**	0.0	0	0	0	0	0	0	0	0	0	0
Career		5	0	9	8	1	0.0	0	0	0	0	0	0	0	0	0	0
