= Hamilton Township, Atlantic County, New Jersey =

Township in Atlantic County, New Jersey, US

Hamilton Township, New Jersey
- Township
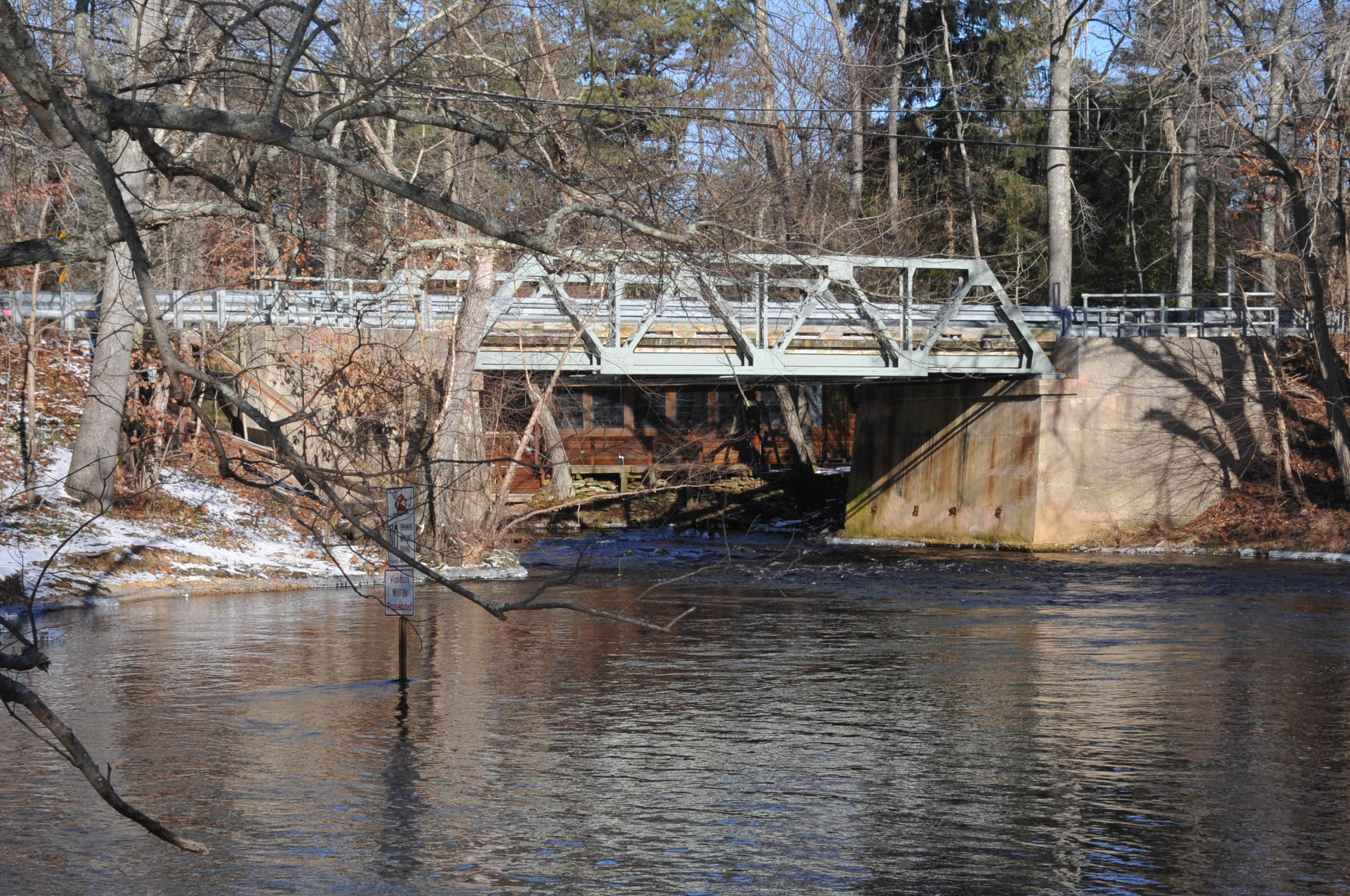
- Weymouth Road Bridge in Hamilton Township

- Seal
- Motto: "New Jersey's Largest Municipality"
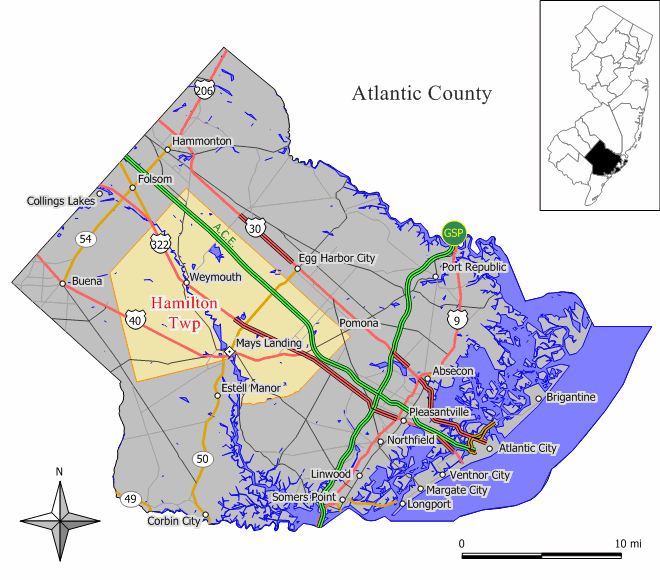
- Location of Hamilton Township in Atlantic County highlighted in yellow (left). Inset map: Location of Atlantic County in New Jersey highlighted in black (right).

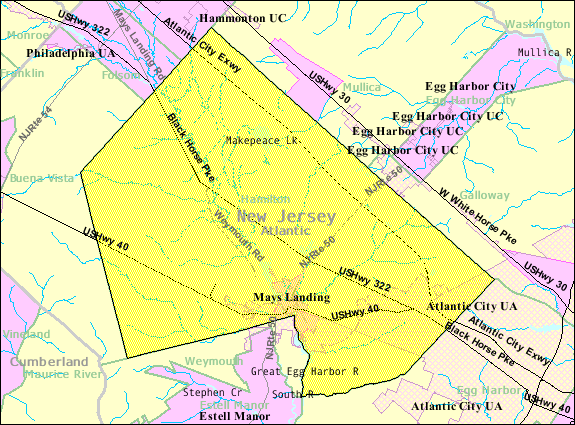
- Census Bureau map of Hamilton Township, Atlantic County, New Jersey

- Location in Atlantic County Location in New Jersey Location in the United States
- Coordinates: 39.481603°N 74.737407°W
- Country: United States
- State: New Jersey
- County: Atlantic
- Incorporated: February 5, 1813
- Named after: Alexander Hamilton

Government
  - Type: Township
  - Body: Township Committee
  - Mayor: Art Schenker (R, term ends December 31, 2026)
  - Administrator: Michael S. Jacobs
  - Municipal clerk: Rita Martino

Area
  - Total: 112.94 sq mi (292.52 km^{2})
  - Land: 110.90 sq mi (287.22 km^{2})
  - Water: 2.05 sq mi (5.31 km^{2}) 1.81%
  - Rank: 2nd of 565 in state 2nd of 23 in county
- Elevation: 30 ft (9.1 m)

Population (2020)
  - Total: 27,484
  - Estimate (2023): 28,266
  - Rank: 92nd of 565 in state 4th of 23 in county
  - Density: 247.8/sq mi (95.7/km^{2})
  - Rank: 490th of 565 in state 16th of 23 in county
- Time zone: UTC−05:00 (Eastern (EST))
  - Summer (DST): UTC−04:00 (Eastern (EDT))
- ZIP Code: 08330 – Mays Landing
- Area code: 609
- FIPS code: 3400129280
- GNIS feature ID: 0882049
- Website: www.hamiltonatlnj.gov

Hamilton Township is a township in Atlantic County, in the U.S. state of New Jersey. As of the 2020 United States census, the township's population was 27,484, an increase of 981 (+3.7%) from the 2010 census count of 26,503, which in turn reflected an increase of 6,004 (+29.3%) from the 20,499 counted in the 2000 census. The Township of Hamilton was incorporated by the New Jersey Legislature on February 5, 1813.

The township calls itself "New Jersey's Largest Municipality" on its stationery and its website. At 110.90 square miles (287.2 km^{2}), Hamilton Township has the largest land area of any municipality in New Jersey. However, with a total area (land and water combined) of 112.94 square miles (292.5 km^{2}) it is the second-largest municipality in New Jersey, behind neighboring Galloway Township, which has a total area of 114.49 square miles (296.5 km^{2}).

Geographically, the township, and all of Atlantic County, is part of the South Jersey region of the state and of the Atlantic City-Hammonton metropolitan statistical area, which in turn is included in the Philadelphia metropolitan area.

== History ==
Hamilton Township's origins are directly tied to the Great Egg Harbor River and its tributaries which run through it. George May, after whom the village of Mays Landing was named, built a shipyard and trading post near Babcock Creek in 1756. By the mid 19th century, Mays Landing reached the height of its shipbuilding.

From 1830 to 1880, more than 200 vessels were built along the Great Egg Harbor River with lumber from native forests and iron from Weymouth foundries. Half of them were produced at Mays Landing. But by the end of the century, wood shipbuilding began to disappear due to the lack of suitable timber. Iron was then substituted for hull construction.

Hamilton was incorporated as a township by an act of the New Jersey Legislature on February 5, 1813, from portions of Egg Harbor Township and Weymouth Township, while the area was still part of Gloucester County. Hamilton became part of the newly created Atlantic County in 1837. Portions of the township were taken to form Hammonton on March 5, 1866, and to form Buena Vista Township on March 5, 1867. The township was named for Alexander Hamilton.

== Geography ==
According to the U.S. Census Bureau, the township had a total area of 112.94 square miles (292.52 km^{2}), including 110.90 square miles (287.22 km^{2}) of land and 2.05 square miles (5.31 km^{2}) of water (1.81%).

Mays Landing, with a 2020 population of 5,603), McKee City (9,758), and Mizpah (479) are census-designated places located within Hamilton Township. Mays Landing has been the county seat of Atlantic County since it was formed in 1837.

Other unincorporated communities, localities, and places located partially or completely within the township include Mays Landing, the county seat of Atlantic County, and Bears Head, Carmantown, Catawba, Clarktown, Cologne, Dacosta, Emmelsville, Gravelly Run, Lake Lenape, Laureldale, Reega, Thompsontown, Weymouth, and Wilsons Landing.

The township borders the Atlantic County municipalities of Buena Vista Township, Egg Harbor Township, Estell Manor, Folsom, Galloway Township, Hammonton, Mullica Township and Weymouth Township.

=== Pinelands Reserve ===
The township is one of 56 South Jersey municipalities that are included within the New Jersey Pinelands National Reserve, a protected natural area of unique ecology covering 1,100,000 acres (450,000 ha), that has been classified as a United States Biosphere Reserve and established by Congress in 1978 as the nation's first National Reserve. Part of the township is included in the state-designated Pinelands Area, which includes portions of Atlantic County, along with areas in Burlington, Camden, Cape May, Cumberland, Gloucester and Ocean counties.

The western three-quarters of the township is governed by regulation by the New Jersey Pinelands Commission, which places major limitations on development in that portion of the township, which remains as pine forest with a distinctly rural character, with other portions designated as a Rural Development Area. Significant portions of the eastern quarter of the township are designated by the Pinelands Commission as part of the Regional Growth Area (RGA), in which development is "allowed and encouraged" in the area surrounding Atlantic City, New Jersey. The majority of the township's residents live in the area covered by the RGA, which has been developed in suburban fashion and includes shopping areas such as the Hamilton Mall, part of the township's 3,000,000 square feet (280,000 m^{2}) of first class commercial retail properties.

== Demographics ==
Historical population
Census	Pop.	Note	%±
1820	877		—
1830	1,424		62.4%
1840	1,565		9.9%
1850	2,015		28.8%
1860	1,945		−3.5%
1870	1,271	*	−34.7%
1880	1,464		15.2%
1890	1,512		3.3%
1900	1,682		11.2%
1910	2,271		35.0%
1920	2,406		5.9%
1930	3,193		32.7%
1940	3,363		5.3%
1950	3,774		12.2%
1960	6,017		59.4%
1970	6,445		7.1%
1980	9,499		47.4%
1990	16,012		68.6%
2000	20,499		28.0%
2010	26,503		29.3%
2020	27,484		3.7%
2023 (est.)	28,266		2.8%
Population sources: 1820-1920 1820-1830; 1840-2000 1840 1850-1870; 1850 1870 1880-1890; 1890-1910 1910-1930; 1940–2000 2000; 2010 2020 * = Lost territory in previous decade.

=== 2010 census ===
The 2010 United States census counted 26,503 people, 9,490 households, and 6,690 families in the township. The population density was 238.5 per square mile (92.1/km^{2}). There were 10,196 housing units at an average density of 91.8 per square mile (35.4/km^{2}). The racial makeup was 67.96% (18,011) White, 18.55% (4,916) Black or African American, 0.26% (68) Native American, 5.41% (1,435) Asian, 0.06% (16) Pacific Islander, 4.12% (1,092) from other races, and 3.64% (965) from two or more races. Hispanic or Latino of any race were 12.79% (3,390) of the population.

Of the 9,490 households, 32.7% had children under the age of 18; 48.1% were married couples living together; 16.7% had a female householder with no husband present and 29.5% were non-families. Of all households, 22.7% were made up of individuals and 6.1% had someone living alone who was 65 years of age or older. The average household size was 2.67 and the average family size was 3.15.

24.1% of the population were under the age of 18, 9.3% from 18 to 24, 28.5% from 25 to 44, 27.6% from 45 to 64, and 10.5% who were 65 years of age or older. The median age was 37.1 years. For every 100 females, the population had 98.3 males. For every 100 females ages 18 and older there were 96.0 males.

The Census Bureau's 2006–2010 American Community Survey showed that (in 2010 inflation-adjusted dollars) median household income was $59,085 (with a margin of error of +/− $3,242) and the median family income was $62,354 (+/− $3,893). Males had a median income of $47,110 (+/− $4,411) versus $36,615 (+/− $3,549) for females. The per capita income for the borough was $25,292 (+/− $1,528). About 8.4% of families and 10.2% of the population were below the poverty line, including 13.1% of those under age 18 and 9.2% of those age 65 or over.

=== 2000 census ===
As of the 2000 United States census, there were 20,499 people, 7,148 households, and 5,039 families residing in the township. The population density was 184.2 inhabitants per square mile (71.1/km^{2}). There were 7,567 housing units at an average density of 68.0 per square mile (26.3/km^{2}). The racial makeup of the township was 71.45% White, 19.26% African American, 0.29% Native American, 3.29% Asian, 0.05% Pacific Islander, 3.33% from other races, and 2.33% from two or more races. Hispanic or Latino of any race were 7.91% of the population.

There were 7,148 households, out of which 37.3% had children under the age of 18 living with them, 50.5% were married couples living together, 15.0% had a female householder with no husband present, and 29.5% were non-families. 22.2% of all households were made up of individuals, and 5.6% had someone living alone who was 65 years of age or older. The average household size was 2.72 and the average family size was 3.21.

In the township, the population was spread out, with 27.1% under the age of 18, 8.2% from 18 to 24, 35.9% from 25 to 44, 20.7% from 45 to 64, and 8.2% who were 65 years of age or older. The median age was 34 years. For every 100 females, there were 99.4 males. For every 100 females age 18 and over, there were 97.7 males.

The median income for a household in the township was $50,259, and the median income for a family was $54,899. Males had a median income of $37,419 versus $30,089 for females. The per capita income for the township was $21,309. About 4.5% of families and 6.6% of the population were below the poverty line, including 9.1% of those under age 18 and 6.6% of those age 65 or over.

== Economy ==
Hamilton is home to over 3,000,000 square feet (280,000 m^{2}) of first-class retail establishments including Hamilton Mall, Consumer Square and Hamilton Commons.

Balic Winery, established in 1966, produces 27 different wines on a 57-acre (23 ha) vineyard.

== Parks and recreation ==
The Great Egg Harbor River and Lake Lenape are recreational resources used by local residents and visitors alike. The Lake Lenape Parks cover more than 2,000 acres (810 ha).

== Government ==
=== Local government ===
Hamilton Township is governed under the Township form of New Jersey municipal government, one of 141 municipalities (of the 564) statewide that use this form. The Township Committee is comprised of five members, who are elected directly by the voters at-large in partisan elections to serve three-year terms of office on a staggered basis, with either one or two seats coming up for election each year as part of the November general election in a three-year cycle. At an annual reorganization meeting each January, the Council selects one of its members to serve as Mayor and another as Deputy Mayor.

As of 2023, the members of the Hamilton Township Committee are Mayor Art Schenker (R, term on committee ends December 31, 2026; term as mayor ends 2025), Deputy Mayor Carl Pitale (R, term on committee ends 2025; term as deputy mayor ends 2025), Robert Laws (R, 2027), Richard Cheek (R, term on committee ends 2027) and Thelma Witherspoon (D, 2025).

In January 2023, former mayor Art Schanker was appointed to fill the seat expiring in December 2024 that had been held by Susan K. Hopkins until she resigned from office earlier that month.

=== Federal, state, and county representation ===
Hamilton Township is located in the 2nd Congressional District and is part of New Jersey's 2nd state legislative district.

For the 119th United States Congress, New Jersey's 2nd congressional district is represented by Jeff Van Drew (R, Dennis Township). New Jersey is represented in the United States Senate by Democrats Cory Booker (Newark, term ends 2027) and Andy Kim (Moorestown, term ends 2031).

For the 2026–2027 session, the 2nd legislative district of the New Jersey Legislature is represented in the New Jersey Senate by Vincent J. Polistina (R, Egg Harbor Township) and in the General Assembly by Don Guardian (R, Atlantic City) and Maureen Rowan (D, Atlantic City).

Atlantic County is governed by a directly elected county executive and a nine-member Board of County Commissioners, responsible for legislation. The executive serves a four-year term and the commissioners are elected to staggered three-year terms, of which four are elected from the county on an at-large basis and five of the commissioners represent equally populated districts. As of 2025, Atlantic County's Executive is Dennis Levinson (R, Northfield), whose term of office ends December 31, 2027. Members of the Board of County Commissioners are:

Ernest D. Coursey (D, District 1-- Atlantic City, Egg Harbor Township (part), Longport, Margate City, and Ventnor City; 2025, Atlantic City), Chair Maureen Kern (R, District 2-- Egg Harbor Township (part), Linwood, Northfield, Somers Point and Pleasantville; 2027, Somers Point), Andrew Parker III (R, District 3-- Egg Harbor Township (part) and Hamilton Township (part); 2026, Egg Harbor Township), Richard R. Dase (R, District 4, including Brigantine, Galloway Township, Egg Harbor Township (part), and Port Republic; 2025, Galloway Township), Vice Chair James A. Bertino (R, District 5-- Buena, Buena Vista Township, Corbin City, Egg Harbor City, Estell Manor, Folsom, Hamilton Township (part), Hammonton, Mullica Township and Weymouth Township; 2027, Hammonton), June Byrnes (R, At-Large; 2026, Linwood), Michael Ruffu (R, At-Large; Margate, 2027) Amy L. Gatto (R, At-large; 2025, Hamilton Township) and John W. Risley (R, At-Large; 2026, Egg Harbor Township)

Atlantic County's constitutional officers are: Clerk Joesph J. Giralo (R, 2026, Hammonton), Sheriff Joe O'Donoghue (R, 2026, Egg Harbor Township) and Surrogate James Curcio (R, 2025, Hammonton).

=== Politics ===
As of March 2011, there were a total of 15,486 registered voters in Hamilton Township, of which 4,305 (27.8% vs. 30.5% countywide) were registered as Democrats, 3,541 (22.9% vs. 25.2%) were registered as Republicans and 7,635 (49.3% vs. 44.3%) were registered as Unaffiliated. There were 5 voters registered as Libertarians or Greens. Among the township's 2010 Census population, 58.4% (vs. 58.8% in Atlantic County) were registered to vote, including 76.9% of those ages 18 and over (vs. 76.6% countywide).

Gubernatorial election results for Hamilton Township
Year	Republican		Democratic		Third party(ies)	
Year	No.	%	No.	%	No.	%
2025	4,800	45.59%	5,669	53.85%	59	0.56%
2021	4,511	54.99%	3,636	44.32%	57	0.69%
2017	2,479	42.50%	3,215	55.12%	139	2.38%
2013	4,086	60.63%	2,526	37.48%	127	1.88%
2009	3,346	48.30%	3,102	44.78%	479	6.91%
2005	2,151	48.57%	2,076	46.87%	202	4.56%

In the 2012 presidential election, Democrat Barack Obama received 6,748 votes here (59.9% vs. 57.9% countywide), ahead of Republican Mitt Romney with 4,334 votes (38.5% vs. 41.1%) and other candidates with 130 votes (1.2% vs. 0.9%), among the 11,268 ballots cast by the township's 16,710 registered voters, for a turnout of 67.4% (vs. 65.8% in Atlantic County). In the 2008 presidential election, Democrat Barack Obama received 6,619 votes here (57.7% vs. 56.5% countywide), ahead of Republican John McCain with 4,612 votes (40.2% vs. 41.6%) and other candidates with 148 votes (1.3% vs. 1.1%), among the 11,481 ballots cast by the township's 16,199 registered voters, for a turnout of 70.9% (vs. 68.1% in Atlantic County). In the 2004 presidential election, Democrat John Kerry received 5,055 votes here (51.9% vs. 52.0% countywide), ahead of Republican George W. Bush with 4,507 votes (46.2% vs. 46.2%) and other candidates with 83 votes (0.9% vs. 0.8%), among the 9,747 ballots cast by the township's 13,128 registered voters, for a turnout of 74.2% (vs. 69.8% in the whole county).

Presidential elections results
Year	Republican	Democratic	Third Parties
2024	48.6% 6,798	49.6% 6,936	1.8% 204
2020	44.9% 6,567	53.6% 7,847	1.5% 229
2016	44.8% 4,775	50.4% 5,364	4.8% 512
2012	38.5% 4,334	59.9% 6,748	1.2% 130
2008	40.2% 4,612	57.7% 6,619	1.3% 148
2004	46.2% 4,507	51.9% 5,055	0.9% 83

In the 2013 gubernatorial election, Republican Chris Christie received 4,086 votes here (59.0% vs. 60.0% countywide), ahead of Democrat Barbara Buono with 2,526 votes (36.5% vs. 34.9%) and other candidates with 127 votes (1.8% vs. 1.3%), among the 6,924 ballots cast by the township's 17,080 registered voters, yielding a 40.5% turnout (vs. 41.5% in the county). In the 2009 gubernatorial election, Republican Chris Christie received 3,346 votes here (47.9% vs. 47.7% countywide), ahead of Democrat Jon Corzine with 3,102 votes (44.4% vs. 44.5%), Independent Chris Daggett with 386 votes (5.5% vs. 4.8%) and other candidates with 93 votes (1.3% vs. 1.2%), among the 6,983 ballots cast by the township's 15,764 registered voters, yielding a 44.3% turnout (vs. 44.9% in the county).

United States Senate election results for Hamilton Township1
Year	Republican		Democratic		Third party(ies)	
Year	No.	%	No.	%	No.	%
2024	6,287	47.48%	6,685	50.49%	269	2.03%
2018	3,979	48.10%	3,951	47.76%	342	4.13%
2012	4,024	37.98%	6,379	60.20%	193	1.82%
2006	2,738	45.41%	3,148	52.21%	144	2.39%

United States Senate election results for Hamilton Township2
Year	Republican		Democratic		Third party(ies)	
Year	No.	%	No.	%	No.	%
2020	6,287	44.05%	7,701	53.95%	286	2.00%
2014	2,884	44.97%	3,379	52.69%	150	2.34%
2013	1,719	45.18%	2,030	53.35%	56	1.47%
2008	4,319	40.61%	6,129	57.63%	188	1.77%

== Education ==
For pre-kindergarten through eighth grade, public school students attend the Hamilton Township Schools. As of the 2021–22 school year, the district, comprised of three schools, had an enrollment of 2,974 students and 254.4 classroom teachers (on an FTE basis), for a student–teacher ratio of 11.7:1. Schools in the district (with 2021–22 enrollment data from the National Center for Education Statistics) are Joseph C. Shaner Memorial School with 628 students in grades K-1, George Hess Educational Complex with 1,263 in pre-kindergarten and grades 2-5 and William Davies Middle School with 979 students in grades 6–8.

Public school students in ninth through twelfth grades attend Oakcrest High School, located in Hamilton Township, which serves students from Hamilton Township. As of the 2021–22 school year, the high school had an enrollment of 952 students and 87.8 classroom teachers (on an FTE basis), for a student–teacher ratio of 10.8:1. The high school is part of the Greater Egg Harbor Regional High School District, a regional public high school district serving students at the district's two other schools, Absegami High School and Cedar Creek High School, from the other constituent districts of Egg Harbor City, Galloway Township and Mullica Township, together with students from the City of Port Republic and Washington Township (in Burlington County), who attend as part of sending/receiving relationships with their respective school districts.

Atlantic County Institute of Technology, established in 1974 and located on a campus covering 58 acres (23 ha), provides vocational instruction to high school students and adults from across Atlantic County, and was one of eight schools in the state recognized in 2008 as a National Blue Ribbon School by the United States Department of Education. Township students can also attend the Charter-Tech High School for the Performing Arts, located in Somers Point.

Saint Vincent de Paul Regional School is a Catholic elementary school in Mays Landing, serving students in pre-kindergarten through eighth grade since 1961 and operated under the jurisdiction of the Diocese of Camden.

Atlantic Cape Community College was the second community college to be established in New Jersey, and moved to its campus in Mays Landing in February 1968 where it now serves students from both Atlantic County and Cape May County.

== Transportation ==
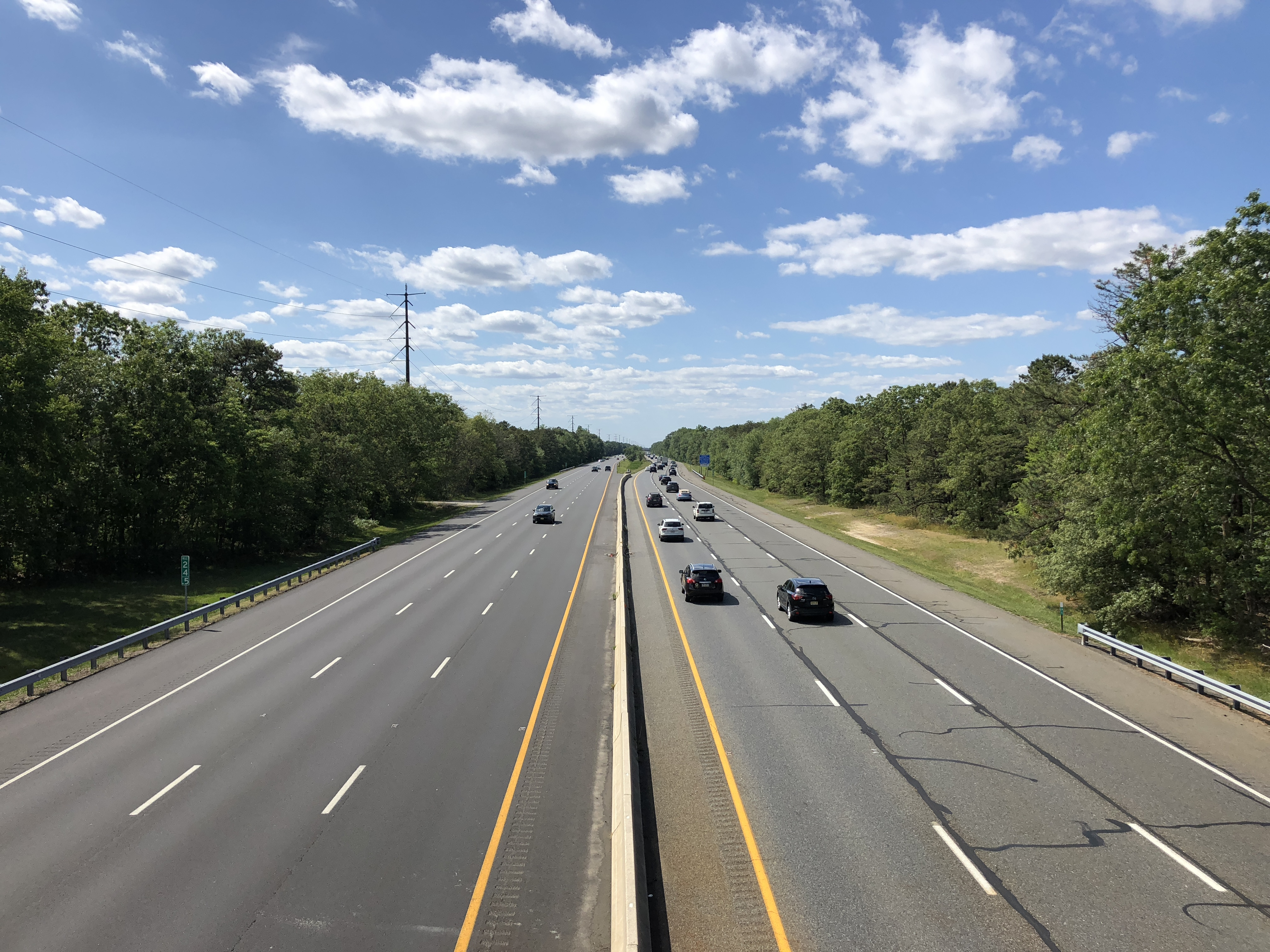
Atlantic City Expressway westbound in Hamilton Township

=== Roads and highways ===
As of May 2010, the township had a total of 258.55 miles (416.10 km) of roadways, of which 171.15 miles (275.44 km) were maintained by the municipality, 40.49 miles (65.16 km) by Atlantic County, 32.91 miles (52.96 km) by the New Jersey Department of Transportation and 14.00 miles (22.53 km) by the South Jersey Transportation Authority.

A variety of roads pass through the township. Hamilton hosts a 14-mile (23 km) stretch of the Atlantic City Expressway with three interchanges and the Egg Harbor Tolls. U.S. Route 40, U.S. Route 322, and Route 50 pass through the township. The major county roads include County Route 552, County Route 559, County Route 563, and County Route 575.

=== Public transportation ===
NJ Transit provides bus service in the township between Cape May and Philadelphia on the 315 route and to Atlantic City on routes 502 from Atlantic Cape Community College and 553 from Upper Deerfield Township.

== Notable people ==
People who were born in, residents of, or otherwise closely associated with Hamilton Township include:

- Brandon Bell (born 1995), linebacker for the Penn State Nittany Lions football team
- Colin Bell (born 1981), member of the New Jersey Senate who represented the 2nd Legislative District
- Johnny Berchtold (born 1994), actor
- Cory Bird (born 1978), safety who played for the Indianapolis Colts
- Ilsley Boone (1879–1968), established and ran the national headquarters of the American Sunbathing Association (ASA) at Sunshine Park (which operated from 1931 to 1983) in Mays Landing
- Darhyl Camper (born 1990), singer-songwriter and record producer
- Suzette Charles (born 1963), singer and entertainer, who became Miss America 1984
- Carmen Cincotti (born 1992), competitive eater
- Mike Curcio (born 1957), former American football linebacker who played in the NFL for the Philadelphia Eagles and the Green Bay Packers
- Darren Drozdov (born 1969), ex-NFL player and retired professional wrestler who competed in the WWF
- Mae Faggs (1932–2000), track-and-field athlete who was a gold medalist in the Women's 4 × 100 meters relay at 1952 Summer Olympics
- Ronnie Faisst (born 1977), professional freestyle motocross and snow bikecross rider
- Harvey Kesselman (born 1951), fifth president of Stockton University
- Walter Lowenfels (1897–1976), poet, journalist, and member of the Communist Party USA who edited the communist newspaper the Daily Worker
- Shameka Marshall (born 1983), long jumper who won the gold medal at the 2007 NACAC Championships in Athletics
- Bo Melton (born 1999), American football wide receiver for the Green Bay Packers
- Max Melton, American football cornerback for the Rutgers Scarlet Knights
- William Moore (1810–1878), served in the United States House of Representatives, where he represented New Jersey's 1st congressional district from 1867 to 1871
- Sharon Kay Penman (born 1945), historical novelist
- Graciela Rivera (1921–2011), first Puerto Rican to sing a lead role at the Metropolitan Opera in New York
- John Roman (born 1952), former professional American football offensive lineman who played seven seasons in the NFL for the New York Jets
- Kanye Udoh, college football running back for the Arizona State Sun Devils
