= Colin Bell (American politician) =

American Democratic Party politician

Member of the New Jersey Senate from the 2nd Legislative District
- In office October 5, 2017 – January 9, 2018
- Preceded by: Jim Whelan
- Succeeded by: Chris A. Brown

Member of the Atlantic County Board of Chosen Freeholders
- In office January 1, 2013 – December 31, 2015
- Preceded by: Frank Giordano
- Succeeded by: Frank Formica

Personal details
- Born: Colin Geoffrey Bell; April 20, 1981 (age 44)
- Party: Democratic
- Education: Oakcrest High School
- Alma mater: American University (B.A.); Washington College of Law (J.D.)
- Occupation: Lawyer
- Website: Legislative web page

Colin Geoffrey Bell (born April 20, 1981) is an American Democratic Party politician who served in the New Jersey Senate, representing the 2nd Legislative District, from October 5, 2017, to January 9, 2018. Bell was selected to fill the seat of fellow Democrat Jim Whelan following Whelan's death; Bell subsequently lost his 2017 general election bid to Republican Chris A. Brown. Prior to his tenure in the New Jersey Senate, Bell was an Atlantic County Freeholder from 2013 to 2015.

== Education and legal career ==
Bell grew up in Hamilton Township, Atlantic County, New Jersey and graduated from Oakcrest High School. He earned a B.A. in political science at American University and was awarded a J.D. from Washington College of Law. From 2006 to 2008, Bell was an Assistant Atlantic County Prosecutor. He works as an attorney dealing with construction-related litigation.

== Political career ==
=== Atlantic County Freeholder ===
Bell ran for one of two at-large seats on the Atlantic County Board of Chosen Freeholders in 2011 and came in fourth, behind Republicans John Risley and Alex Marino, as well as incumbent Democrat Jim Schroeder, who lost his seat on the board. He ran again in 2012 and won the one at-large seat on the board, where he served a single three-year term of office. Bell knocked off two-term incumbent Republican Frank Giordano by a 52,632 to 48,828 margin to become the board's second Democrat. On the freeholder board, Bell supported programs to increase openness and fiscal responsibility, help the area recover from Hurricane Sandy and to assist veterans find homes and jobs.

=== New Jersey Legislature ===
In 2015, Bell ran for the New Jersey General Assembly in the 2nd District and came in third behind the two incumbents, Republican Chris A. Brown and Democrat Vince Mazzeo, as neither incumbent was able to get his running mate elected despite heavy spending on both sides.

Bell was unanimously selected on September 5, 2017, by the Democratic county committee to fill the remainder of Whelan's senate term following Whelan's death on August 22. He was sworn into office on October 5.

A resident of Margate City, Bell had originally planned to run for Assembly in 2017, with Mazzeo running for Whelan's Senate seat. After Mazzeo's father died, Mazzeo decided to run for re-election to his Assembly seat and Bell ran unopposed in the Democratic primary for the vacant Senate seat.

In one of the most expensive of the 120 legislative races in the 2017 general election, in which $4.6 million was spent, Republican Chris A. Brown defeated Bell by a 54%–46% margin, taking a Senate seat that had been held by Democrats since 2008 and giving the Republicans their only Senate seat that changed parties, in an election that had many major victories for the Democratic Party across the state.

== Electoral history ==
=== Atlantic County Board of Chosen Freeholders ===
Atlantic County Freeholder-at-Large, 2012
Party	Candidate	Votes	%	±%
Democratic	Colin Bell	53,632	52.34	▲31.25
Republican	Frank V. Giordano	48,828	47.66	
Total votes		102,460	100.0	

Atlantic County Freeholder-at-Large, 2011
Party	Candidate	Votes	%
Republican	Alex Marino	29,006	27.26
Republican	John W. Risley, Jr.	28,971	27.22
Democratic	Jim Schroeder (incumbent)	24,032	22.58
Democratic	Colin Bell	22,438	21.09
Cleanliness is Godliness	Mark Lovett	1,967	1.85
Total votes		106,414	100.0

June 7, 2011 Democratic primary results
Party	Candidate	Votes	%
Democratic	Jim Schroeder	3,837	50.96
Democratic	Colin Bell	3,693	49.04
Total votes		7,530	100.0

New Jersey General Assembly
Preceded by Jim Whelan	Member of the New Jersey Senate for the 2nd District; October 5, 2017 – January 9, 2018	Succeeded by Chris A. Brown
Political offices
Preceded by Frank Giordano	Atlantic County at-large Freeholder; January 1, 2013– December 31, 2015	Succeeded by Frank D. Formica
