= Mike Curcio =

American football player (born 1957)

No. 57
- Position: Linebacker

Personal information
- Born: January 24, 1957 (age 69); Hudson, New York, U.S.
- Listed height: 6 ft 1 in (1.85 m)
- Listed weight: 237 lb (108 kg)

Career information
- High school: Oakcrest (Mays Landing, New Jersey)
- College: Temple
- NFL draft: 1980: 8th round, 218th overall pick

Career history
- New York Giants (1980)*; Philadelphia Eagles (1980–1982); New York Giants (1982)*; Green Bay Packers (1983)
- * Offseason or practice squad member only

Awards and highlights
- Second-team All-East (1979)

Career NFL statistics
- Fumble recoveries: 1
- Stats at Pro Football Reference

Mike Curcio (born January 24, 1957) is an American former professional football player who was a linebacker in the National Football League (NFL) for the Philadelphia Eagles and Green Bay Packers. He played college football for the Temple Owls.

== Early life and college ==
Curcio was born on January 24, 1957, in Hudson, New York. Raised in the Mays Landing section of Hamilton Township, Atlantic County, New Jersey, Curcio played prep football at Oakcrest High School, graduating in 1975. He played at the collegiate level at Temple University.

== Professional career ==
Curcio was selected in the eighth round of the 1980 NFL draft by the Philadelphia Eagles and would later play two seasons with the team. During the 1983 NFL season, he played with the Green Bay Packers.
