= Ronnie Faisst =

American motorcycle racer

Personal information
- Full name: Ronald Faisst
- Nickname: Kung Fu
- Nationality: American
- Born: June 22, 1977 (age 49) Mays Landing, New Jersey, U.S.
- Height: 5 ft 11 in (180 cm)
- Weight: 161 lb (73 kg)
- Spouse: Melissa Faisst

Sport
- Sport: Freestyle motocross (FMX)
- Event(s): Best Trick, Step Up, Freestyle, Speed & Style, SNB Snow BikeCross
Medal record
Representing United States
Summer X Games
Bronze medal – third place	2010 Los Angeles	Moto X Speed & Style
Bronze medal – third place	2011 Los Angeles	Moto X Speed & Style
Bronze medal – third place	2012 Los Angeles	Moto X Speed & Style
Winter X Games
Bronze medal – third place	2006 Aspen	Moto X Best Trick

Ronald Faisst (born June 22, 1977) is an American professional freestyle motocross and snow bikecross rider. Faisst is a four-time Moto X bronze medalist and an original member of the Metal Mulisha. Faisst became a born-again Christian in 2006.

== Early life ==
Faisst grew up in the Mays Landing section of Hamilton Township, Atlantic County, New Jersey and graduated from Oakcrest High School in 1995. He took up motocross racing in the late 1980s. Faisst became one of the top riders in the Northeast winning at popular local tracks like Raceway Park and Sleepy Hollow. After turning pro in 1995 and racing local Nationals and Supercrosses, Faisst left for California in 1997.

== X Games competition history ==
GOLD (0) SILVER (0) BRONZE (4)
X Games Aspen 2017	SNB Snow BikeCross	11th	
X Games Austin 2014	MTX Speed & Style	7th	
X Games Barcelona 2013	MTX Speed & Style	5th	
X Games Los Angeles 2012	MTX Speed & Style	3rd	Bronze medal
X Games 2011	MTX Speed & Style	3rd	Bronze medal
X Games 2010	MTX Speed & Style	3rd	Bronze medal
X Games 2009	MTX Freestyle	15th	
X Games 2008	MTX Freestyle	9th	
X Games 2007	MTX Freestyle	8th	
X Games 2006	MTX Freestyle	8th	
Winter X 2006	MTX Best Trick	3rd	Bronze medal
X Games 2005	MTX Freestyle	6th	
X Games 2005	MTX Best Trick	5th	
X Games 2004	MTX Best Trick	7th	
Winter X 2004	MTX Best Trick	8th	
X Games 2002	MTX Freestyle	12th	
X Games 2002	MTX Best Trick	7th	
X Games 2002	MTX Step Up	11th	
X Games 2000	MTX Step Up	7th	
X Games 2000	MTX Freestyle	11th	
