= Carmen Cincotti =

American competitive eater

- Born: July 4, 1993 (age 33); Mays Landing, New Jersey
- Education: The College of New Jersey
- Occupation: competitive eater
- Known for: Ranked second in Major League Eating (2018)

Carmen Cincotti (born July 4, 1993) is an American competitive eater and holder of multiple records in Major League Eating, who earned $10,000 for his second-place finish in the Nathan's Hot Dog Eating Contest in 2017 in which he ate 60 hot dogs in ten minutes, twelve fewer than repeat champion Joey Chestnut. From August 2018 to June 2019, he was ranked number two in Major League Eating.

== Early life and education ==
Raised in the Mays Landing section of Hamilton Township, Atlantic County, New Jersey, the 150-pound (68 kg) Cincotti graduated in 2011 from Oakcrest High School, where he played on the school's soccer team; four years later, he earned a degree in biomechanical engineering at The College of New Jersey where he became a member of Phi Kappa Tau fraternity. He is a resident of Newark, New Jersey.

== Career ==
Cincotti developed an interest in competitive eating as a child, but he was unsuccessful in his first effort to make it past a qualifier for the annual Fourth of July Nathan's competition, describing that he "was only able to eat 13 hot dogs", which forced him to come to the realization that he "had to work at this if I was going to get to the top level." Efforts to expand his eating abilities included eating a sugar cookie weighing 6 pounds (2.7 kg) and three loaves of French toast.

In addition to running and working out five days a week, his training regimen involves focusing on the food item to be consumed six to eight weeks before a competition so that he becomes acclimated to eating massive quantities of the food. While practicing for the 2017 Nathan's competition, he consumed as many as 1,000 hot dogs. His technique for hot dog competitive eating is to eat two hot dogs, chewed just enough to swallow, followed by two buns softened with water. He stops eating for as long as two days after a competition, before resuming his usual diet.

In 2016, Cincotti came in second to Joey Chestnut, who ate 43 pork roll sandwiches in 10 minutes. At the 2017 Nathan's competition, Cincotti came in second with 60 hot dogs completed, as Chestnut won his tenth title with a count of 72. In July 2018, Cincotti finished second in the Nathan's Famous Hot Dog Eating Contest to Joey Chestnut, eating 64 HDB in ten minutes to Chestnut's 74. In August 2018, Carmen Cincotti retired from competitive eating.

=== Eating records ===
Cincotti has set several Major League Eating records, including consuming 101 bratwursts in 10 minutes in 2016, as well as 158 croquetas in 8 minutes (since broken) and 61.75 ears of corn in 12 minutes at two events in 2017.

== See also ==
- List of competitive eaters
