= Samuel Richards (ironmaster) =

American businessman and ironmaster (1769–1842)

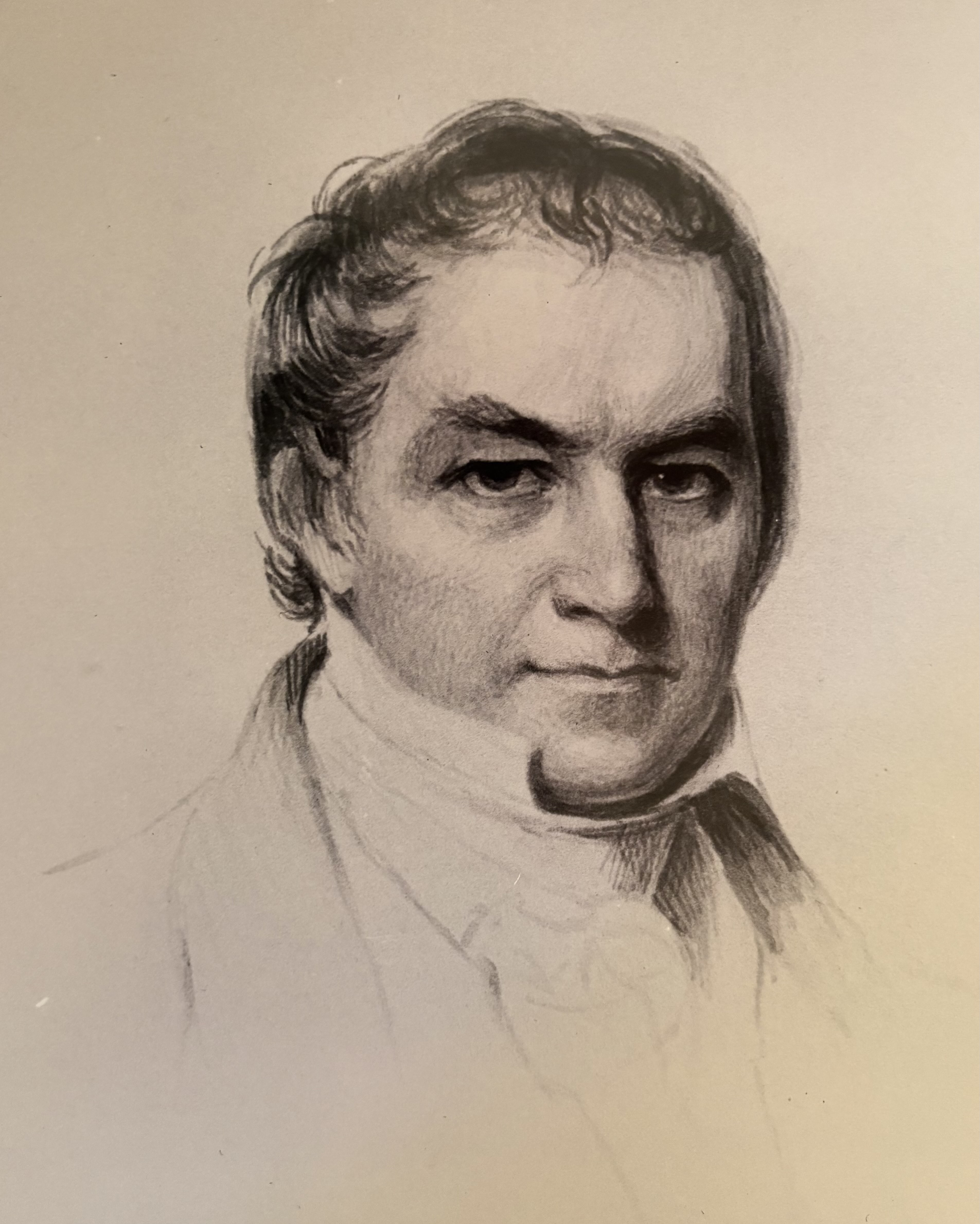
- George Hewitt Cushman Miniature (1839)
- Born: Samuel Patrick Richards; March 8, 1769; Warwick Furnace, Pennsylvania
- Died: January 4, 1842 (aged 72); Philadelphia, Pennsylvania
- Resting place: Laurel Hill Cemetery
- Occupation: Ironmaster
- Years active: 1790–1842
- Known for: Owner of Atsion, Weymouth, and Martha Furnace
- Spouses: Mary Smith Morgan (m. 1797; died 1820); Anna Maria Witherspoon (m. 1822)
- Children: 11
- Relatives: Benjamin Wood Richards (half brother)

Samuel Richards (March 8, 1769 – January 4, 1842) was an American businessman and ironmaster. He was heavily involved in the New Jersey iron industry during the early 19th century, starting with his family's iron business in Batsto Village, New Jersey, where he apprenticed under his father, William Richards.

== Early Life & Family ==
Samuel Richards was born in the Richards family home at Warwick Furnace in Pennsylvania. Samuel was the third child of eleven born to William and Mary Richards of Warwick Furnace. Richards would begin his career in the New Jersey iron industry when his father obtained management of the Batsto Iron Works in 1784, in which he began an apprenticeship at the age of 15. By 1790, Samuel was managing the Richards family store in Philadelphia located at 111 North Water Street, succeeded the previous store agent Charles Pettit.

Richards would marry his first wife, Mary Smith Morgan, on November 18, 1797, in Philadelphia. The ceremony was officiated by Reverend Ashbel Green, then the chaplain of the United States House of Representatives. The couple would have eight children between 1798 and 1810. Only three, Thomas, Sarah, and Elizabeth would survive to adulthood. Mary would pass away on May 3, 1820 after a brief illness.

Richards would remarry on October 8,1822 to Anna Maria Witherspoon of New York. The couple would have three children with the youngest two, Maria and William, surviving to adulthood.

== Career ==
=== Eagle Iron Works ===
In July 1801, Richards had succeeded Robert Morris as a partner at the Eagle Iron Works in Philadelphia, operating under the partnership of "Foxall & Richards." The Eagle Iron Works was located along the Schuylkill River in Philadelphia and was responsible for casting six-plate stoves, pig iron, anvils, and forge hammers.

=== Weymouth Iron Works ===
In April 1808, Richards and his cousin, Joseph Ball, purchased a 6/8th share of the Weymouth Iron Works in Atlantic County, New Jersey, following the death of George Ashbridge. The remaining 2/8th share was kept by the heirs of Ashbridge, it appears Richards wanted the children to continue receiving an income from the Weymouth estate. Following the death of Joseph Ball in 1821, Richards held a controlling 3/8th share after Balls' 3/8th share was divided between his and Samuel's aunt, Sarah Richards Hastings and Ball's uncle, William Richards, who was Samuel Richards' father. By 1824, Richards had gained a controlling 6/8th share following the purchase of his aunt's share in 1822, and the death of his father in 1823. By 1834, the furnace and forge produced around 1,100 tons of iron castings per year and employed around 100 people. The village of Weymouth contained a population of around 600 people.

=== Mays Landing ===
When Atlantic County, New Jersey was formed in 1837, the town of Mays Landing was selected as the county seat. That year, Richards erected the Samuel Richards Hotel at the corner of Main Street & Farragut Avenue. With the establishment of the Atlantic County Courthouse in 1838, the hotel provided accommodations for the increased amount of traffic that came from jurors, judges, lawyers, clerks and regular passerby needing a place of accommodation. Richards and his wife also donated a plot of land where the Mays Landing Presbyterian Church was established in 1841.

=== Atsion Iron Works ===
In June 1819, Samuel Richards purchased a half share in the Atsion Iron Works in Shamong Township, New Jersey. Richards operated the furnace and forge from June 1819 to February 1820 for an order of cast-iron water pipes. The works closed shortly after and the half share was put up for sale. In December 1824, Richards purchased the remaining half and reopened the furnace and forge. By 1826, Richards had his country estate established at Atsion with a new general store and church being erected in 1827 and 1828, respectively. By 1834, the combined operations of the furnace and forge produced 800-900 tons of iron per year. The works employed around 100 people with the village itself boasting a population of 700 people. Around 1830, Richards began experimenting with the production of silk on the Atsion property by constructing a silk mill, however it is unclear whether this business was profitable or not.

=== Philadelphia ===
Richards would retain an active social and business environment in Philadelphia. When the Walnut Street Theatre underwent a major renovation in 1828, Richards provided the theatre with cast-iron wreaths, guilloches and balustrades. Richards had served as a financial backer for the Chesapeake & Delaware Canal project in 1823.

While his brother, Benjamin Wood Richards, was serving as Mayor of Philadelphia as a Jacksonian Democrat, Richards was active in political circles opposing the presidency of Andrew Jackson. On occasion serving as the chairman on boards against the re-election of Jackson.

== Later years and Death ==
Richards' eldest son, Thomas, began taking a more active role in his fathers affairs by the mid-1830s until his sudden death in 1839 from tuberculosis. Richards continued to serve within the business communities of Philadelphia by the beginning of the 1840s, serving under Jacob Ridgway as a manager for the Fairmount Bridge Company in 1841.

Richards would pass away unexpectedly at his Philadelphia home from appendicitis on January 4, 1842.
