= Max Melton =

American football player (born 2002)

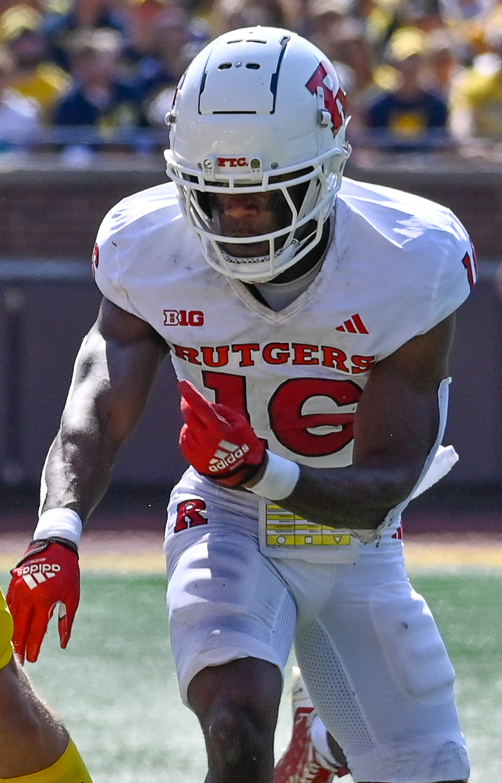
- Melton with Rutgers in 2023

No. 16 – Arizona Cardinals
- Position: Cornerback
- Roster status: Active

Personal information
- Born: April 15, 2002 (age 24); Mays Landing, New Jersey, U.S.
- Listed height: 5 ft 11 in (1.80 m)
- Listed weight: 187 lb (85 kg)

Career information
- High school: Cedar Creek (Egg Harbor City, New Jersey)
- College: Rutgers (2020–2023)
- NFL draft: 2024: 2nd round, 43rd overall pick

Career history
- Arizona Cardinals (2024–present)

Career NFL statistics as of Week 5, 2026
- Total tackles: 97
- Forced fumbles: 1
- Pass deflections: 14
- Stats at Pro Football Reference

Malachi "Max" Melton (born April 15, 2002) is an American professional football cornerback for the Arizona Cardinals of the National Football League (NFL). He played college football for the Rutgers Scarlet Knights and was selected by the Cardinals in the second round of the 2024 NFL draft.

== Early life ==
Melton grew up in the Mays Landing section of Hamilton Township, Atlantic County, New Jersey and attended Cedar Creek High School. Melton initially committed to play college football at Purdue over offers from Rutgers and Temple. He flipped his commitment to Rutgers during his senior year.

== College career ==
Melton played in nine games with six starts during his freshman season with the Rutgers Scarlet Knights and made 21 tackles. He started ten games at cornerback as a sophomore and had 28 tackles with three interceptions and six passes broken up. Melton missed three games due to a suspension. He was named honorable mention All-Big Ten Conference after recording 33 tackles with two tackles for loss, two interceptions, and ten passes broken up.

== Professional career ==
Pre-draft measurables
Height	Weight	Arm length	Hand span	Wingspan	40-yard dash	10-yard split	20-yard split	20-yard shuttle	Three-cone drill	Vertical jump	Broad jump	Bench press
5 ft 11 in (1.80 m)	187 lb (85 kg)	32 1/8 in (0.82 m)	9 1/8 in (0.23 m)	6 ft 4 5/8 in (1.95 m)	4.39 s	1.51 s	2.56 s	4.29 s	6.95 s	40.5 in (1.03 m)	11 ft 4 in (3.45 m)	16 reps
All values from NFL Combine/Pro Day

Melton was drafted by the Arizona Cardinals in the second round with the 43rd overall pick of the 2024 NFL draft.

== NFL career statistics ==
Legend
**Bold**	Career high

=== Regular season ===
Year	Team	Games		Tackles					Interceptions						Fumbles				
Year	Team	GP	GS	Cmb	Solo	Ast	Sck	TFL	Int	Yds	Avg	Lng	TD	PD	FF	Fum	FR	Yds	TD
2024	ARI	17	3	**51**	**36**	**15**	0.0	**2**	0	0	0.0	0	0	**5**	**1**	0	0	0	0
2025	ARI	10	8	31	21	10	0.0	1	0	0	0.0	0	0	**5**	0	0	0	0	0
2026	ARI	5	5	15	9	6	0.0	1	0	0	0.0	0	0	4	0	0	0	0	0
Career		32	16	97	63	31	0.0	4	0	0	0.0	0	0	14	1	0	0	0	0

== Personal life ==
Melton's father, Gary, played football at Rutgers and his mother, Vicky, played on the women's basketball team. His older brother, Bo Melton, played wide receiver at Rutgers and currently plays in the NFL for the Green Bay Packers. Another brother, Gary Jr., played football at Delaware State.
