= Hamilton Township Schools =

School district in Atlantic County, New Jersey, US

Hamilton Township School District
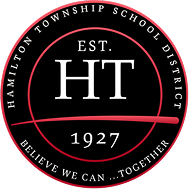

Address
- 1876 Dennis Foreman Drive Hamilton Township, Atlantic County, New Jersey, 08330; United States
- Coordinates: 39.455686°N 74.678881°W

District information
- Motto: Believe We Can... Together
- Grades: PreK-8
- Superintendent: Jeffery Zito
- Business administrator: Christopher Veneziani
- Schools: 3

Students and staff
- Enrollment: 2,974 (as of 2021–22)
- Faculty: 254.4 FTEs
- Student–teacher ratio: 11.7:1
- Athletic conference: South Jersey Cape Atlantic League

Other information
- District Factor Group: CD
- Website: www.hamiltonschools.org
Ind.	Per pupil	District spending	Rank (*)	K-8 average	%± vs. average
1A	Total Spending	$16,257	23	$18,891	−13.9%
1	Budgetary Cost	11,893	13	14,159	−16.0%
2	Classroom Instruction	7,146	8	8,659	−17.5%
6	Support Services	1,882	25	2,167	−13.2%
8	Administrative Cost	1,288	14	1,547	−16.7%
10	Operations & Maintenance	1,485	40	1,612	−7.9%
13	Extracurricular Activities	83	35	104	−20.2%
16	Median Teacher Salary	48,780	2	61,136
Data from NJDoE 2014 Taxpayers' Guide to Education Spending. *Of K-8 districts with more than 750 students. Lowest spending=1; Highest=84

The Hamilton Township Schools are a comprehensive community public school district, serving students in pre-kindergarten through eighth grade from Hamilton Township, in Atlantic County, in the U.S. state of New Jersey.

As of the 2021–22 school year, the district, comprised of three schools, had an enrollment of 2,974 students and 254.4 classroom teachers (on an FTE basis), for a student–teacher ratio of 11.7:1.

The district had been classified by the New Jersey Department of Education as being in District Factor Group "CD", the sixth-highest of eight groupings. District Factor Groups organize districts statewide to allow comparison by common socioeconomic characteristics of the local districts. From lowest socioeconomic status to highest, the categories are A, B, CD, DE, FG, GH, I and J.

Public school students in ninth through twelfth grades attend Oakcrest High School, located in Hamilton Township, which serves students from Hamilton Township. As of the 2021–22 school year, the high school had an enrollment of 952 students and 87.8 classroom teachers (on an FTE basis), for a student–teacher ratio of 10.8:1. The high school is part of the Greater Egg Harbor Regional High School District, a regional high school district serving students at the district's two other schools, Absegami High School and Cedar Creek High School, from the other constituent districts of Egg Harbor City, Galloway Township and Mullica Township, together with students from the City of Port Republic and Washington Township (in Burlington County), who attend as part of sending/receiving relationships with their respective school districts.

== History ==
In 2009-2010 the district had 3,889 students, its peak enrollment. Enrollment decreased afterward due to a decline in casino jobs. Between 2010-2011 and 2014 its enrollment declined by almost 11%.

== William Davies Turnaround (2021 - Present) ==
In 2020, the district was in a period of chaos as described by teachers and students. Test scores declined significantly due to poor district management and the COVID-19 pandemic; frequent high-intensity fighting was prevalent throughout William Davies Middle School and confirmed harassment cases skyrocketed at the George L. Hess Educational Complex.

The Board of Education hired Dr. Jeff Zito as superintendent who made significant changes to building leadership and began the implementation of programs to support students and staff. Dr. Jennifer Holmstrom restructured Davies school and behaviors dropped sharply. In 2024, high intensity behaviors were down by 55%, according to state data.

Athletics and Activities

Holmstrom emphasized student involvement in athletics and after school clubs and activities to build school culture. The school offers over 30 activities for students ranging from sports, debate, and art.

Ed Aleszczyk is the district Athletic Director.

=== The Davies Media Program (2023 - present) ===
Holmstrom and Zito pushed for more opportunities for students and established career-readiness classes (CTE) that aligned with surrounding high school curricula. The best example of this is the schools vast media program which highlights academic and athletic student achievement as well as acts as a public relations department for the district. The department acts as a magnet pathway program to Oakcrest High School and the Atlantic County Institute of Technology.

Established in 2023, the program has won multiple awards and gained national attention.

In the 2024-25 and 2025-26 school years, the program was the most watched middle school program in the state, per Google Analytics.

In 2026-27, the program expanded to the George L. Hess Educational Complex.

The Dragon Network is described as the media department's flagship program.

In June 2026, the New Jersey Department of Education's standards website listed the program as a "Career and Technical Education Exemplar" at the secondary level.

== Awards, recognition and rankings ==
For the 1998-99 school year, the George L. Hess Educational Complex was recognized with the National Blue Ribbon Award from the United States Department of Education, the highest honor that an American school can achieve.

George L. Hess Education Complex was named as a "Star School" by the New Jersey Department of Education, the highest honor that a New Jersey school can achieve, in the 1994-95 school year

In 2026, William Davies Middle School received a model schools recognition for the school's recent academic gains and tremendous reduction of behavioral incidents since 2021.

== Schools ==
Schools in the district (with 2021–22 enrollment data from the National Center for Education Statistics) are:

Elementary schools

- Joseph C. Shaner Memorial School with 628 students in grades K-1
  - Daniel M. Cartwright, principal
- George Hess Educational Complex with 1,263 in pre-kindergarten and grades 2-5
  - Jennifer Holmstrom, principal

Middle School

- William Davies Middle School with 998 students in grades 6-8
  - Ian Levine, principal

== Administration ==
Core members of the district's administration are:

- Jeffery Zito, superintendent
- Christopher Veneziani, business administrator and board secretary

== Board of education ==
The district's board of education, comprised of nine members, sets policy and oversees the fiscal and educational operation of the district through its administration. As a Type II school district, the board's trustees are elected directly by voters to serve three-year terms of office on a staggered basis, with three seats up for election each year held (since 2012) as part of the November general election. The board appoints a superintendent to oversee the district's day-to-day operations and a business administrator to supervise the business functions of the district.
