= Samuel Richards Hotel =

Historic hotel in New Jersey, US

- U.S. National Register of Historic Places
- U.S. Historic district – Contributing property
- New Jersey Register of Historic Places
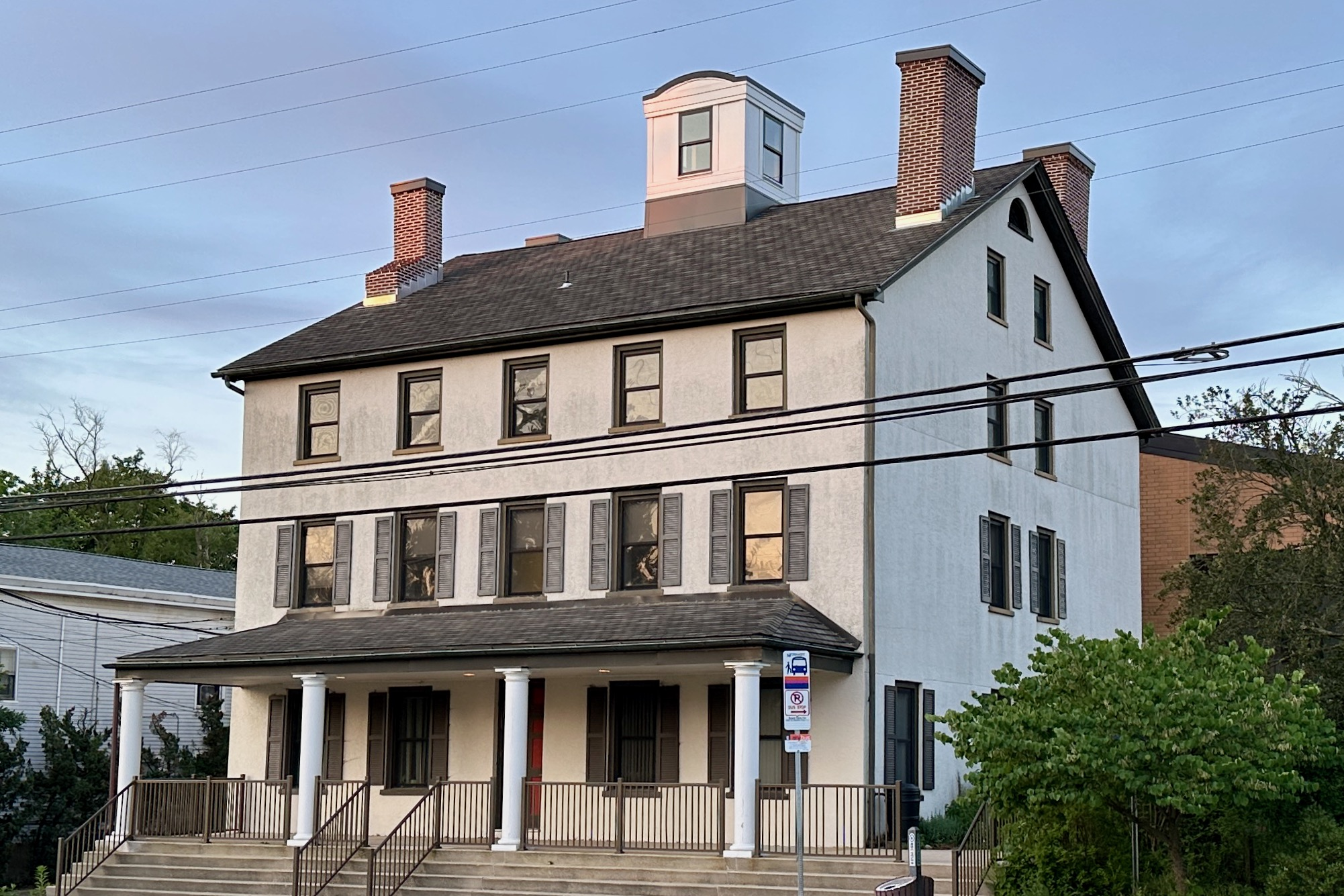

- Location within Atlantic County, New Jersey Location within New Jersey Location within the United States
- Location: 106 East Main Street, Mays Landing, New Jersey
- Coordinates: 39°27′4″N 74°43′31″W
- Built: 1837
- Part of: Mays Landing Historic District (ID90001245)
- NRHP reference No.: 79001468
- NJRHP No.: 340

Significant dates
- Added to NRHP: August 31, 1979
- Designated CP: August 23, 1990
- Designated NJRHP: June 19, 1979

The Samuel Richards Hotel, also known as the American Hotel, is located at 106 East Main Street in the Mays Landing section of Hamilton Township in Atlantic County, New Jersey, United States. The sandstone building was built in 1837 and added to the National Register of Historic Places on August 31, 1979, for its significance in architecture, commerce, community planning, law, politics, and social history. The hotel was added as a contributing property to the Mays Landing Historic District in 1990.

== History and description ==
The three and one-half story hotel was built in 1837 by Samuel Richards, formerly from Philadelphia, a prominent Mays Landing property owner and businessman in the iron industry. It was used by the ship-building community. A later owner was John E. Champion, a former Atlantic City councilman. Another owner was William Veal, who also started an opera house in Mays Landing. The county bought the property in 1978.

== See also ==
- National Register of Historic Places listings in Atlantic County, New Jersey
