= Athletics at the 2011 Pan American Games – Women's long jump =

Women's long jump at the 2011 Pan American Games
- Venue: Telmex Athletics Stadium
- Dates: October 26
- Competitors: 13 from 9 nations

Medalists
Gold medal	Maurren Maggi	Brazil
Silver medal	Shameka Marshall	United States
Bronze medal	Caterine Ibargüen	Colombia

The women's long jump event of the athletics events at the 2011 Pan American Games was held on 26 October at the Telmex Athletics Stadium. The defending Pan American Games champion was Maurren Maggi of Brazil, who successfully defended her title.

== Records ==
Prior to this competition, the existing world and Pan American Games records were as follows:

World record	Galina Chistyakova (URS)	7.52	Leningrad, Soviet Union	June 11, 1988
Pan American Games record	Jackie Joyner-Kersee (USA)	7.45	Indianapolis, United States	August 13, 1987

== Qualification ==
Each National Olympic Committee (NOC) was able to enter up to two entrants providing they had met the minimum standard (6.15) in the qualifying period (January 1, 2010 to September 14, 2011).

== Schedule ==
Date	Time	Round
October 26, 2011	17:05	Final

== Results ==
All distances shown are in meters:centimeters

KEY:	q	Fastest non-qualifiers	Q	Qualified	NR	National record	PB	Personal best	SB	Seasonal best

=== Final ===
The final was held on October 26.

Rank	Athlete	Nationality	#1	#2	#3	#4	#5	#6	Result	Notes
1st place, gold medalist(s)	Maurren Maggi	Brazil	6.58	6.80	6.94	–	6.60	–	6.94	SB
2nd place, silver medalist(s)	Shameka Marshall	United States	6.73	6.43	6.46	x	6.28	6.08	6.73	
3rd place, bronze medalist(s)	Caterine Ibargüen	Colombia	6.58	6.46	6.48	6.63	6.44	6.49	6.63	NR
4	Suslaidy Girat	Cuba	6.60	6.31	x	6.45	x	x	6.60	
5	Keila Costa	Brazil	6.37	x	6.22	6.35	6.36	6.32	6.37	
6	Krysha Bayley	Canada	6.36	6.27	x	x	x	6.32	6.36	
7	Tori Polk	United States	6.34	6.05	x	6.02	x	6.10	6.34	
8	Zoila Flores	Mexico	6.08	6.22	6.08	5.85	6.16	6.06	6.22	
9	Yvonne Treviño	Mexico	6.17	6.18	x				6.18	
10	Daniela Pávez	Chile	x	5.96	5.99				5.99	
11	Tricia Flores	Belize	5.28	5.76	5.88				5.88	SB
12	Yanique Levy	Jamaica	x	5.81	x				5.81	
13	Nickevea Wilson	Jamaica	x	x	5.44				5.44	
