= Kanye Udoh =

American football player

No. 6 – Liberty Flames
- Position: Running back
- Class: Redshirt Junior

Personal information
- Born: Mays Landing, New Jersey, U.S.
- Listed height: 6 ft 1 in (1.85 m)
- Listed weight: 220 lb (100 kg)

Career information
- High school: St. Augustine Preparatory School
- College: Army (2023–2024); Arizona State (2025); Liberty (2026–present)

Awards and highlights
- Second-team All-AAC (2024)
- Stats at ESPN

Kanye Udoh is an American college football running back for the Liberty Flames. He previously played for the Army Black Knights and Arizona State Sun Devils.

== Early life ==
Raised in the Mays Landing section of Hamilton Township, Atlantic County, New Jersey, Udoh played high school football St. Augustine Preparatory School, where he rushed for 1,498 yards and 17 touchdowns as a senior. He was rated as a three-star recruit, the 145th running back, and the 2,021st overall prospect in the class of 2022. Udoh committed to play for the Army Black Knights over other schools such as Delaware, Maryland, Buffalo, Connecticut, West Virginia, Nebraska, Temple, Rutgers, Syracuse and Boston College.

== College career ==
=== Army ===
Udoh scored his first career touchdown in week 2 of the 2023 season, during a 57–0 win over Delaware State. He finished his freshman season with Army in 2023, appearing in ten games where he notched 524 yards and a touchdown. In week 6 of the 2024 season, Udoh rushed for 137 yards and two touchdowns in a win over Tulsa. In week 9, he rushed for 158 yards and two touchdowns in a 20–3 win over rival Air Force. In the 2024 regular season finale, Udoh rushed 14 times for 53 yards as Army fell to the rival Navy Midshipmen 31–13. He finished the 2024 season rushing for 1,117 yards and 10 touchdowns on 179 carries for the Black Knights. After the season, Udoh entered his name into the NCAA transfer portal.

=== Arizona State ===
On December 21, 2024, Udoh announced that he would transfer to Arizona State.

On January 5, 2026, Udoh announced that he would enter the transfer portal for the second time.

=== Liberty ===
On January 22, 2026, Udoh announced that he would transfer to Liberty.
