= Samuel Richards (priest) =

Samuel (L) Bruce Richards was the first Dean of Trinidad.

He worked at Saint Philip, Barbados before coming to Trinidad where he set up a school for the children of church goers.
