= Shameka Marshall =

American long jumper

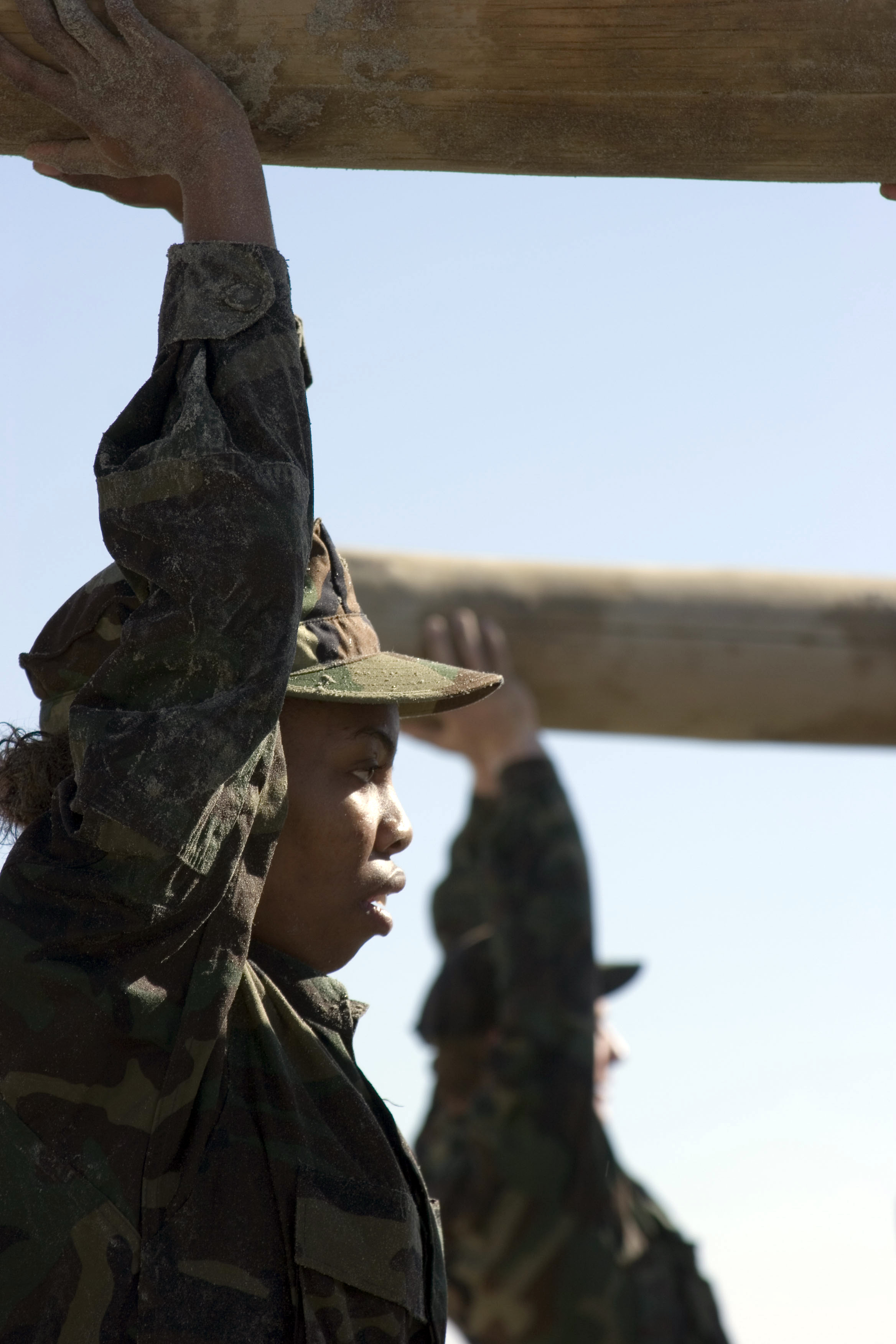

Personal information
- Born: 9 September 1983 (age 43) Mizpah, New Jersey, United States

Sport
- Sport: Athletics
Medal record
Athletics
Representing United States
NACAC Championships in Athletics
Gold medal – first place	2007 El Salvador	long jump
Pan American Games
Silver medal – second place	2011 Jalisco	long jump

Shameka Marshall (born 9 September 1983) is an American long jumper who attended Rutgers University. She was a 2-time All American in the long jump and also qualified for the NCAA 60 meter hurdles with a personal best of 8.19 seconds. Her best long jump while attending Rutger was 21 feet 10.25 inches. She was inducted into the Rutgers Athletics Hall of Fame in October 2017.

Raised in Quinton Township, New Jersey, Marshall attended Oakcrest High School, where she won two individual state titles as a senior and graduating in 2001.

Professionally, she won a gold medal at the 2007 NACAC Championships in Athletics. While also representing the United States in the 4 × 100 m relay team.

Marshall participated in United States Olympic Trials three times: in 2004 (during college), 2008 and in 2012. She remained in the top 10 ranking for the Women's long jump during her 10-year professional career. During this time, Marshall also coached athletics at Temple University in Philadelphia. She improved her mark to 22 feet 1 inch under the direction of Coach Eric Mobley and also secured a silver medal at the Pan American Games in Guadalajara, Mexico in 2011.

Marshall has since created and published her first single called "Even Though." Currently she personally trains individual athletes to their next level and instructs all ages to fitness success.
