= Mays Landing, New Jersey =

Community in New Jersey, US

- Census-designated place
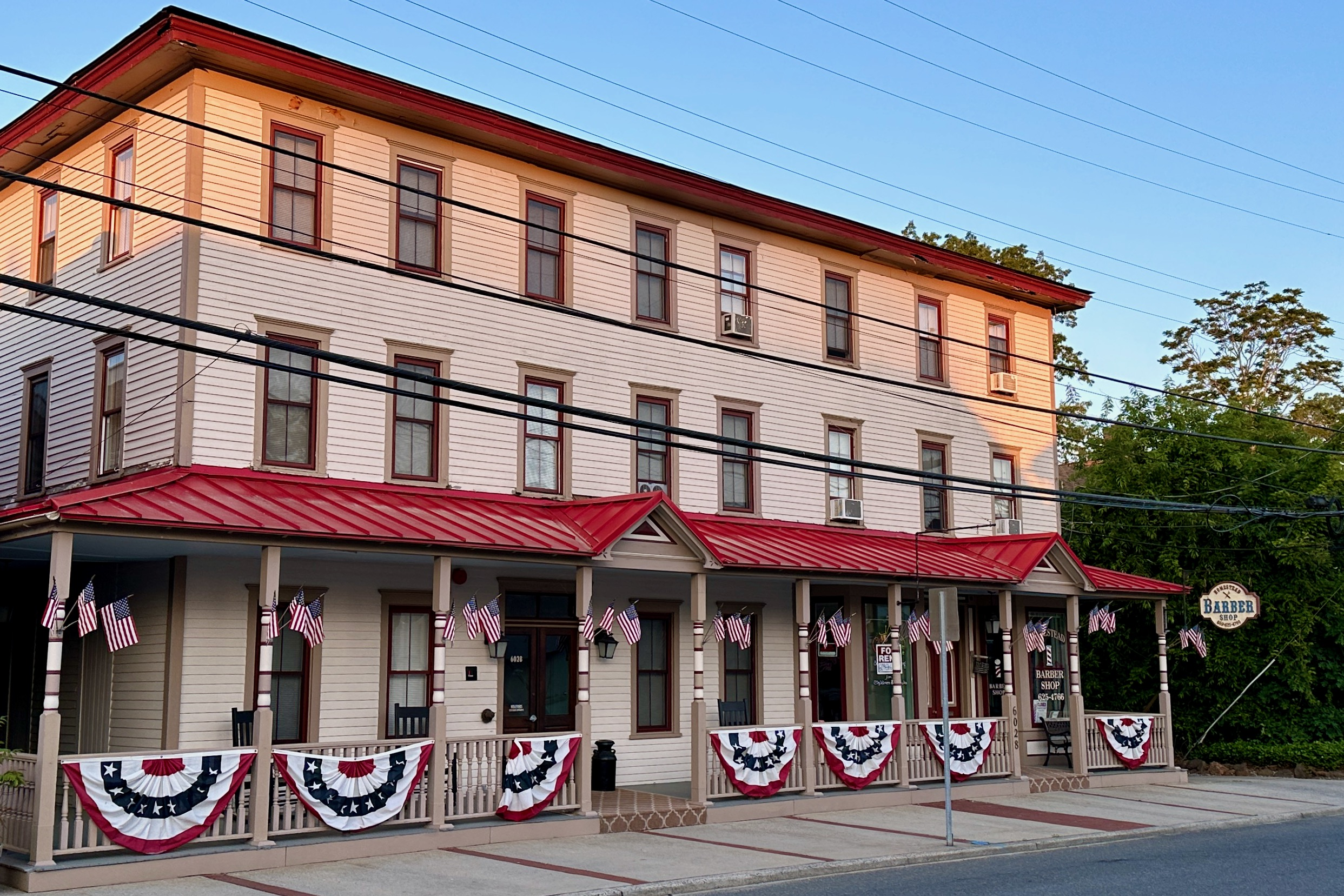
- Former Central Hotel on Main Street, part of the Mays Landing Historic District

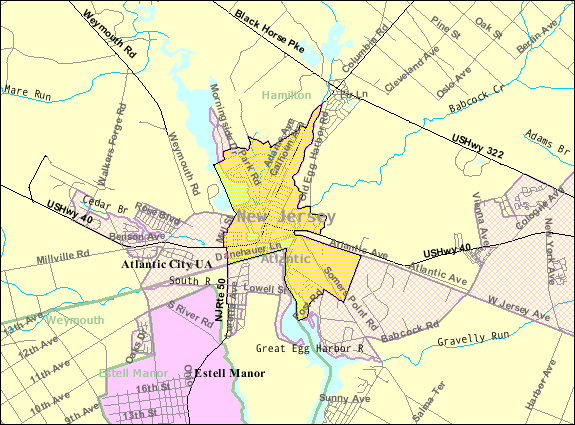
- Census Bureau map of Mays Landing, New Jersey
- Interactive map of Mays Landing, New Jersey
- Location in Atlantic County Location in New Jersey Location in the United States
- Coordinates: 39.452862°N 74.723936°W
- Country: United States
- State: New Jersey
- County: Atlantic
- Township: Hamilton
- Named for: Captain George May

Area
  - Total: 5.94 sq mi (15.38 km^{2})
  - Land: 5.64 sq mi (14.61 km^{2})
  - Water: 0.30 sq mi (0.77 km^{2}) 11.91%
- Elevation: 13 ft (4 m)

Population (2020)
  - Total: 5,603
  - Density: 993.1/sq mi (383.4/km^{2})
- Time zone: UTC−05:00 (Eastern (EST))
  - Summer (DST): UTC−04:00 (Eastern (EDT))
- ZIP Code: 08330
- Area code: 609
- FIPS code: 34-44820
- GNIS feature ID: 02390140

Mays Landing is an unincorporated community and census-designated place (CDP) in and the county seat of Atlantic County, New Jersey, located within Hamilton Township. As of the 2020 census, Mays Landing had a population of 5,603.

== History ==
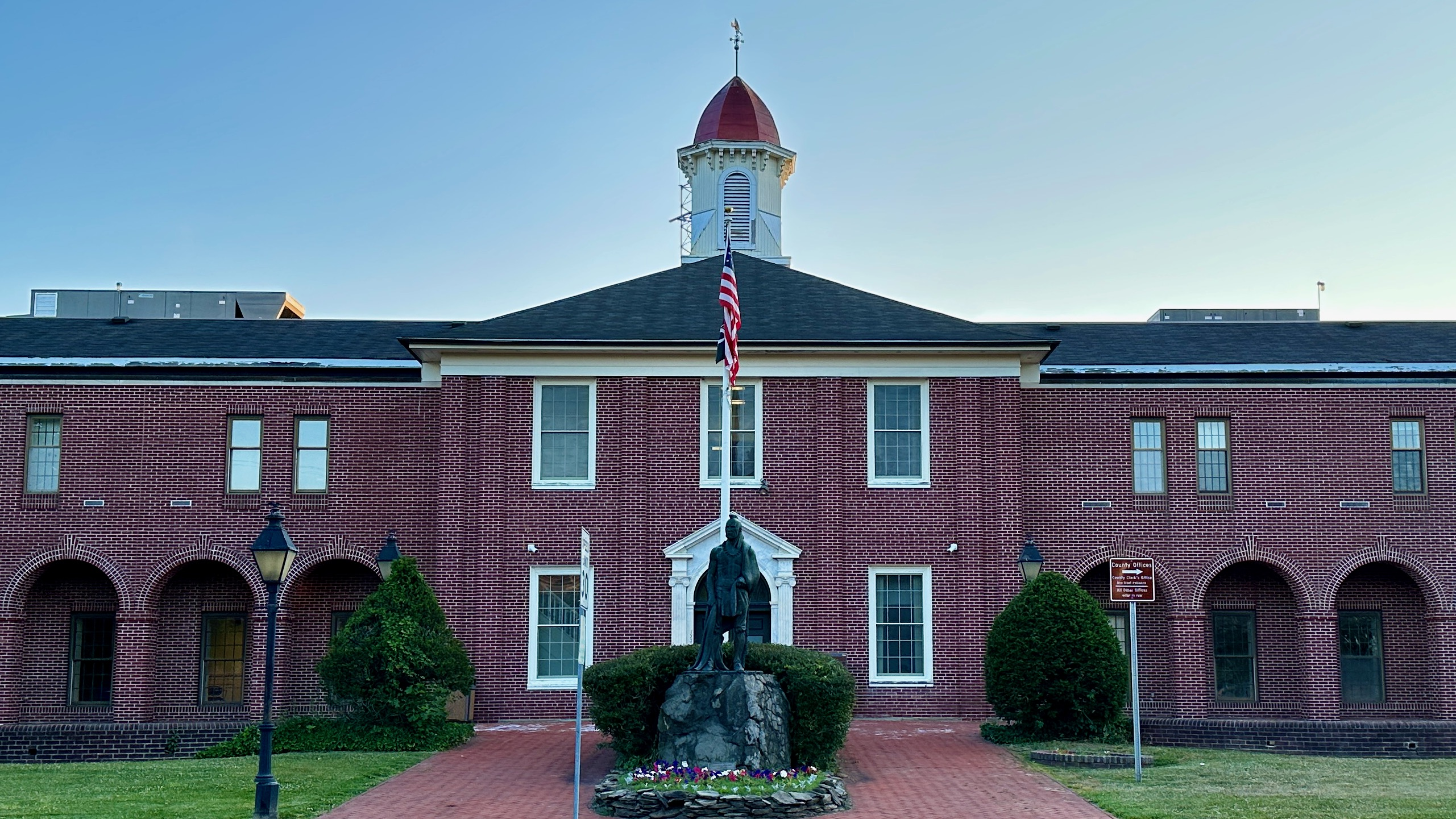
1838 Atlantic County Courthouse

The community was named for Captain George May, who sailed the Great Egg Harbor River in 1740, and purchased land in the area in 1756. The location was suitable for building ships using local timber and iron from Weymouth foundries. In February 1837, Atlantic County was created and Mays Landing was established as the county seat. The Atlantic County Courthouse was built here in 1838.

=== Weymouth Furnace/Forge ===
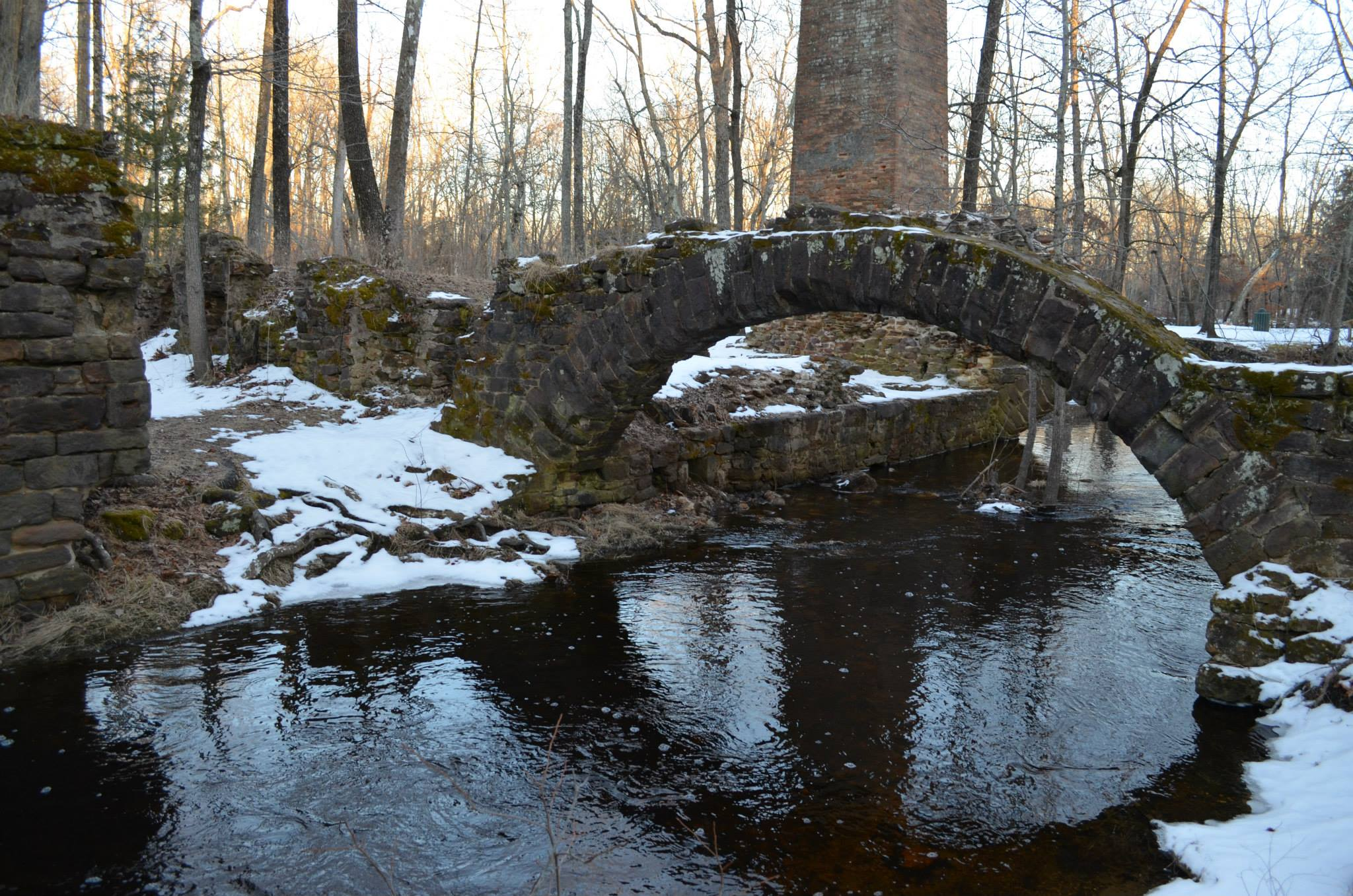
Weymouth Furnace in 2014

The Weymouth Forge and Furnace, located along Route 559 just north of the Black Horse Pike (Route 322) in Atlantic County, New Jersey, is now part of the Atlantic County Park System. The site was established in the early 1800s after George Ashbridge and Charles Shoemaker purchased the land in 1800. Iron production began in 1802, using local bog iron and charcoal as fuel. By the 1850s, it had grown into a bustling industrial community with a furnace, forge, gristmill, sawmill, church, store, worker housing, and other facilities. The forge primarily produced cast iron water pipes and also supplied shot and bombs to the U.S. government during the War of 1812. However, by 1862, competition from Pennsylvania’s coal-powered forges made it unprofitable, and the facility was destroyed by fire that same year.

In the decades that followed, the property hosted two paper mills—the Atlantic Paper Mills and Weymouth Paper Mills—which operated from the 1860s to 1897. After their closure, the area fell into decline: the dam broke in 1916, the mill pond drained, and the remaining buildings were scavenged for materials. In 1966, Atlantic County began acquiring portions of the original 85,973-acre tract to preserve its history. Today, the Weymouth Furnace site near Mays Landing remains a popular destination for visitors, offering views of the surviving ruins and access to canoeing on the Great Egg Harbor River.

== Historic district ==
- Mays Landing Historic District
- U.S. National Register of Historic Places
- U.S. Historic district
- New Jersey Register of Historic Places
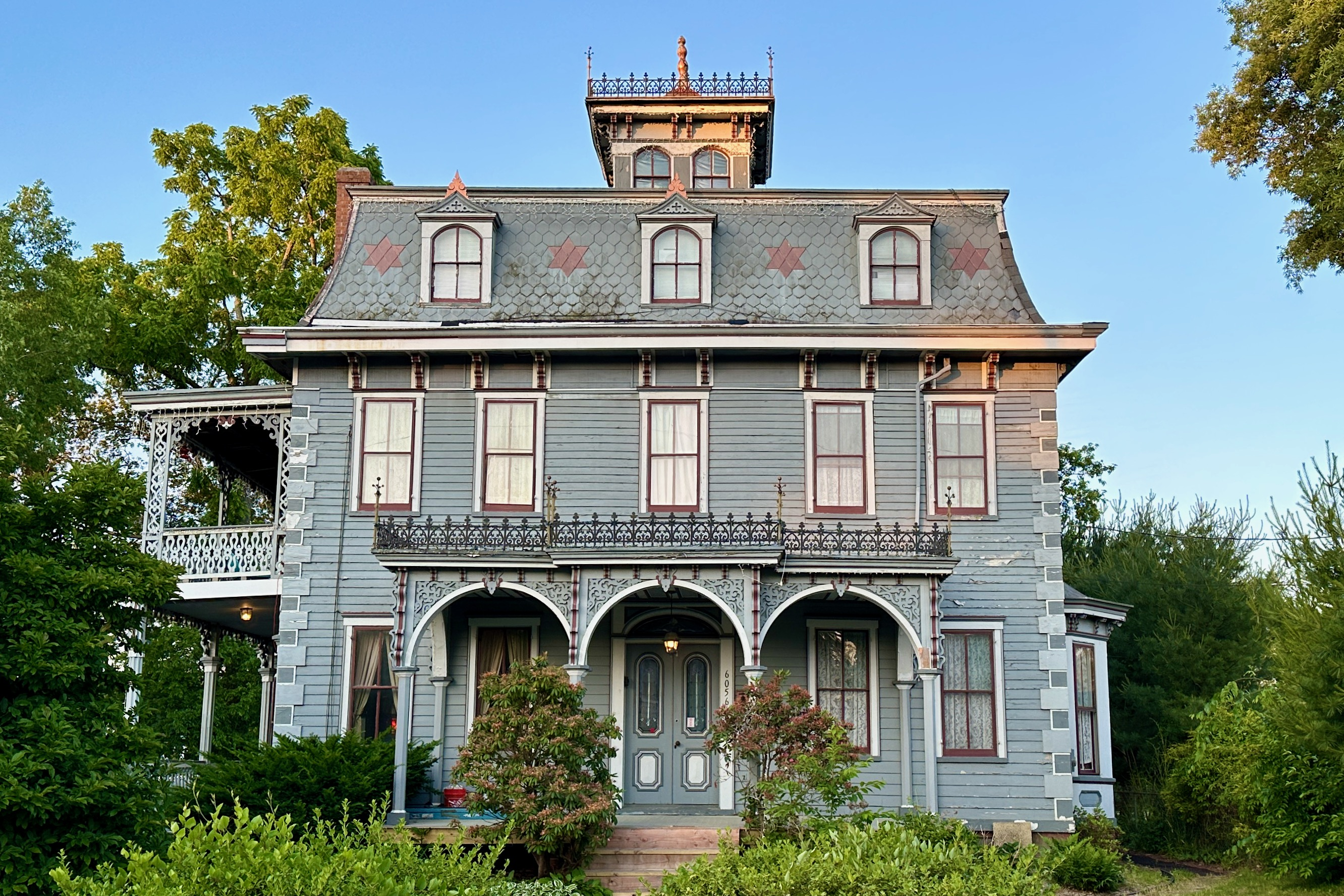
- Abbott House
- Area: 147 acres (59 ha)
- Architectural style: Second Empire, Gothic, Italianate
- NRHP reference No.: 90001245
- NJRHP No.: 338

Significant dates
- Added to NRHP: August 23, 1990
- Designated NJRHP: January 11, 1990

The Mays Landing Historic District is a 147-acre (59 ha) historic district encompassing East and West Main streets and intersecting streets in the community. It was added to the National Register of Historic Places on August 23, 1990, for its significance in architecture, community planning, industry, and politics. The district has 259 contributing buildings, four contributing sites, three contributing structures, and three contributing objects. Contributing buildings include the Mays Landing Presbyterian Church and the Samuel Richards Hotel, which were previously listed individually on the NRHP. The Abbott House features Second Empire architecture. The Champion House has Italianate architecture and Doric columns. The owner, John E. Champion, was once the owner of the Samuel Richards Hotel, then known as the American Hotel.

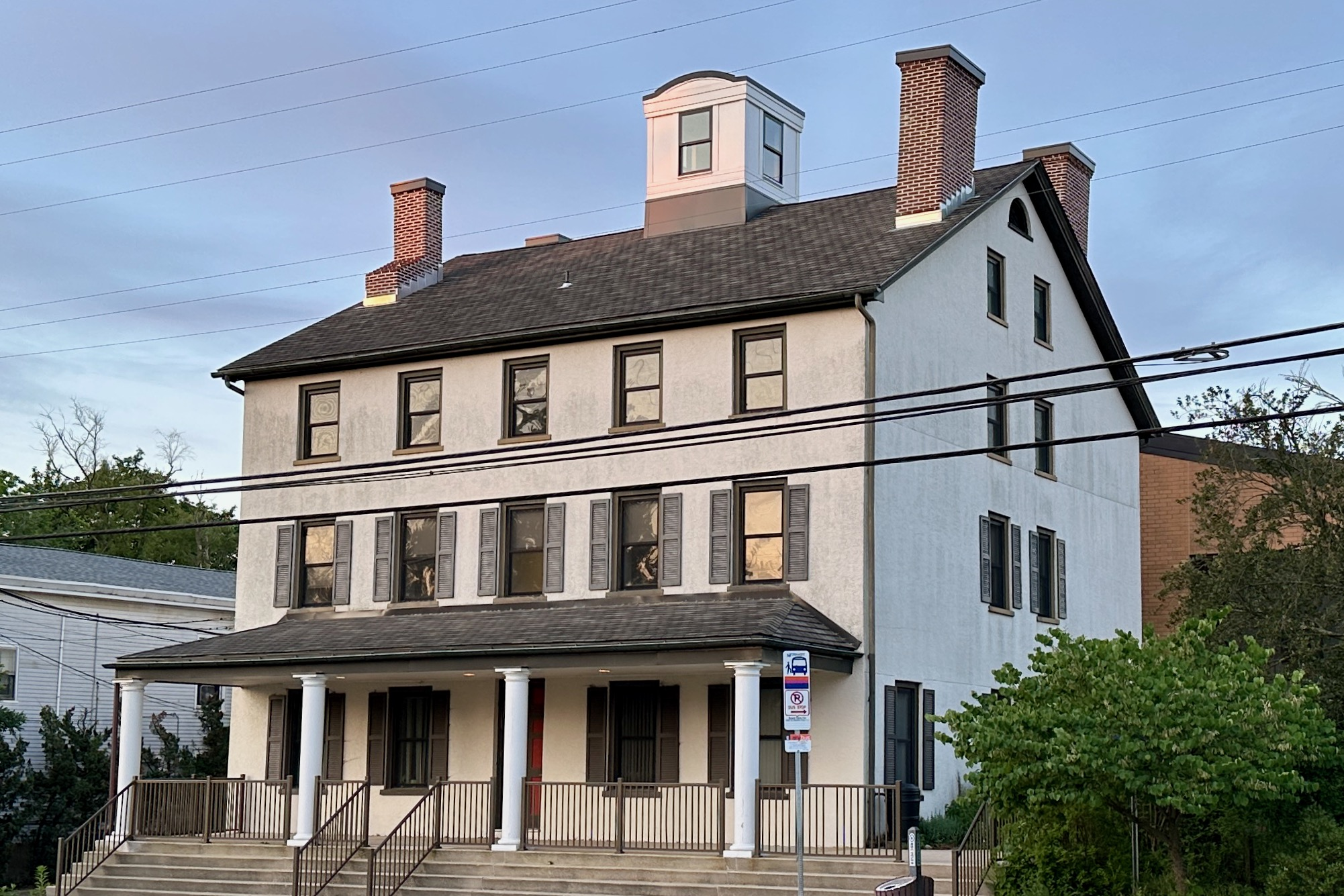
Samuel Richards Hotel, built 1837

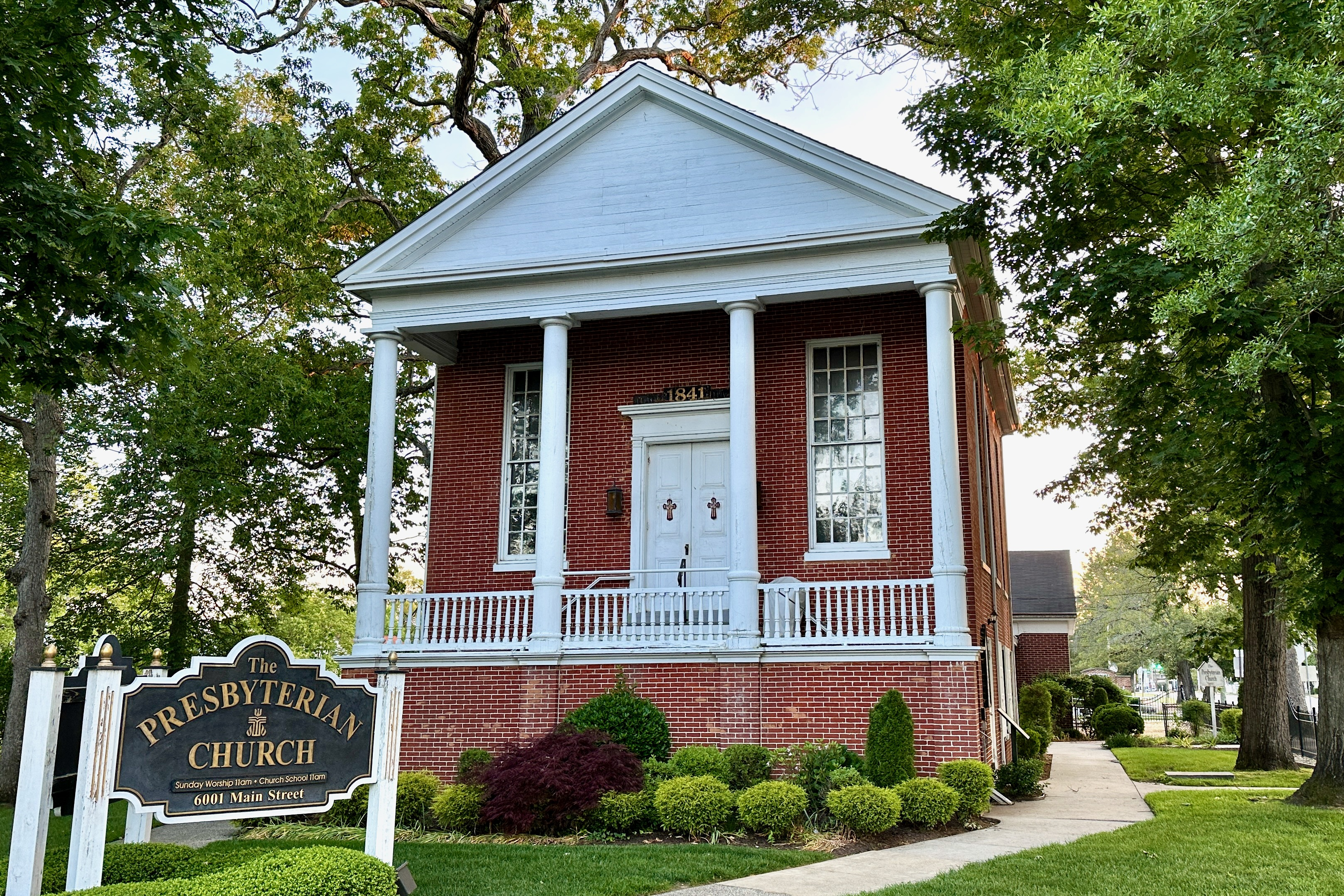
Mays Landing Presbyterian Church, built 1841

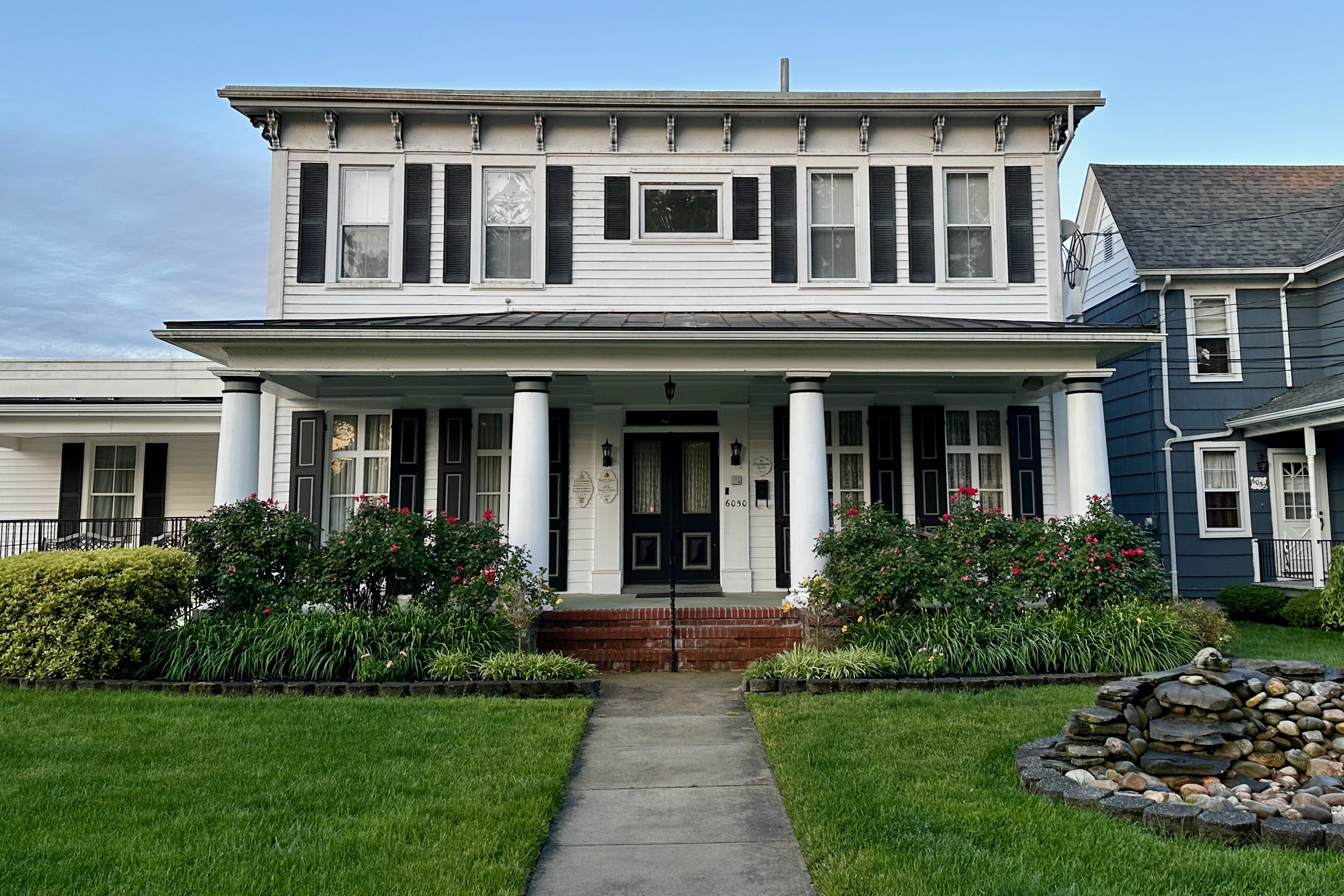
Champion House, built c. 1860

== Geography ==
According to the U.S. Census Bureau, Mays Landing has a total area of 1.885 square miles (4.88 km^{2}), including 1.660 square miles (4.30 km^{2}) of land and 0.225 square miles (0.58 km^{2}) of water (11.91%).

The community is located 20 miles (32 km) west of Atlantic City. The community known as Mizpah is located 5 miles (8 km) west of Mays Landing on U.S. Route 40 but is sometimes considered part of it, with ZIP codes of 08330 and 08342. McKee City is an unincorporated area 4 miles (6 km) east of Mays Landing on US 40.

=== Climate ===
The climate in this area is characterized by hot, humid summers and generally mild to cool winters. According to the Köppen Climate Classification system, Mays Landing has a humid subtropical climate, abbreviated "Cfa" on climate maps.

Climate data for Atlantic City International Airport, New Jersey (1981–2010 normals, extremes 1943–present)
Month	Jan	Feb	Mar	Apr	May	Jun	Jul	Aug	Sep	Oct	Nov	Dec	Year
Record high °F (°C)	78 (26)	76 (24)	87 (31)	94 (34)	99 (37)	106 (41)	105 (41)	103 (39)	99 (37)	96 (36)	84 (29)	77 (25)	106 (41)
Mean maximum °F (°C)	62.6 (17.0)	64.3 (17.9)	73.3 (22.9)	82.4 (28.0)	88.6 (31.4)	94.1 (34.5)	96.6 (35.9)	95.0 (35.0)	89.5 (31.9)	82.1 (27.8)	72.8 (22.7)	64.2 (17.9)	98.0 (36.7)
Mean daily maximum °F (°C)	41.5 (5.3)	44.3 (6.8)	51.8 (11.0)	61.7 (16.5)	71.3 (21.8)	80.6 (27.0)	85.5 (29.7)	83.7 (28.7)	77.0 (25.0)	66.6 (19.2)	56.3 (13.5)	46.0 (7.8)	63.9 (17.7)
Mean daily minimum °F (°C)	24.5 (−4.2)	26.4 (−3.1)	32.7 (0.4)	41.8 (5.4)	51.0 (10.6)	61.2 (16.2)	66.9 (19.4)	65.2 (18.4)	57.4 (14.1)	45.6 (7.6)	37.2 (2.9)	28.4 (−2.0)	44.9 (7.2)
Mean minimum °F (°C)	4.4 (−15.3)	9.1 (−12.7)	15.1 (−9.4)	26.1 (−3.3)	34.5 (1.4)	45.7 (7.6)	53.6 (12.0)	51.8 (11.0)	41.7 (5.4)	29.8 (−1.2)	20.0 (−6.7)	10.7 (−11.8)	2.2 (−16.6)
Record low °F (°C)	−10 (−23)	−11 (−24)	2 (−17)	12 (−11)	25 (−4)	37 (3)	42 (6)	40 (4)	32 (0)	20 (−7)	10 (−12)	−7 (−22)	−11 (−24)
Average precipitation inches (mm)	3.22 (82)	2.87 (73)	4.21 (107)	3.63 (92)	3.35 (85)	3.11 (79)	3.72 (94)	4.11 (104)	3.15 (80)	3.42 (87)	3.27 (83)	3.69 (94)	41.75 (1,060)
Average snowfall inches (cm)	4.5 (11)	6.7 (17)	1.1 (2.8)	0.3 (0.76)	0 (0)	0 (0)	0 (0)	0 (0)	0 (0)	0 (0)	0.2 (0.51)	3.7 (9.4)	16.5 (42)
Average precipitation days (≥ 0.01 in)	10.1	9.5	10.3	11.6	10.6	9.4	9.2	8.7	8.0	8.1	9.3	10.2	115.0
Average snowy days (≥ 0.1 in)	2.9	2.8	0.9	0.3	0	0	0	0	0	0	0.1	1.7	8.7
Average relative humidity (%)	69.5	69.0	66.9	66.4	70.7	72.9	73.9	75.7	76.4	74.8	72.8	70.6	71.6
Mean monthly sunshine hours	150.8	157.9	204.5	218.9	243.9	266.2	276.3	271.3	227.6	200.5	147.4	133.8	2,499.1
Percentage possible sunshine	50	53	55	55	55	60	61	64	61	58	49	46	56
Source: NOAA (relative humidity and sun 1961–1990)

== Demographics ==
Historical population
Census	Pop.	Note	%±
1950	1,301		—
1960	1,404		7.9%
1970	1,272		−9.4%
1980	2,054		61.5%
1990	2,090		1.8%
2000	2,321		11.1%
2010	2,135		−8.0%
2020	5,603		162.4%
Population sources: 1950 1960 1970; 1980 1990 2000; 2010 2020

Mays Landing first appeared as an unincorporated community in the 1950 U.S. census; and then as a census designated place in the 1980 U.S. census.

=== Racial and ethnic composition ===
Mays Landing CDP, New Jersey – racial and ethnic composition Note: the US Census treats Hispanic/Latino as an ethnic category. This table excludes Latinos from the racial categories and assigns them to a separate category. Hispanics/Latinos may be of any race.
Race / ethnicity (NH = Non-Hispanic)	Pop 2000	Pop 2010	Pop 2020	% 2000	% 2010	% 2020
White alone (NH)	2,058	1,807	3,771	88.67%	84.64%	67.30%
Black or African American alone (NH)	115	108	742	4.95%	5.06%	13.24%
Native American or Alaska Native alone (NH)	2	7	21	0.09%	0.33%	0.37%
Asian alone (NH)	17	21	167	0.73%	0.98%	2.98%
Native Hawaiian or Pacific Islander alone (NH)	5	0	1	0.22%	0.00%	0.02%
Other race alone (NH)	1	0	25	0.04%	0.00%	0.45%
Mixed-race or multiracial (NH)	31	37	228	1.34%	1.73%	4.07%
Hispanic or Latino (any race)	92	155	648	3.96%	7.26%	11.57%
Total	2,321	2,135	5,603	100.00%	100.00%	100.00%

=== 2020 census ===
As of the 2020 census, Mays Landing had a population of 5,603. The median age was 46.4 years. 16.4% of residents were under the age of 18 and 22.9% were 65 years of age or older. For every 100 females, there were 100.3 males, and for every 100 females age 18 and over there were 99.7 males.

94.0% of residents lived in urban areas, while 6.0% lived in rural areas.

There were 2,211 households, of which 24.0% had children under the age of 18 living in them. Of all households, 44.5% were married-couple households, 16.0% were households with a male householder and no spouse or partner present, and 32.3% were households with a female householder and no spouse or partner present. About 30.8% of all households were made up of individuals, and 15.2% had someone living alone who was 65 years of age or older.

There were 2,332 housing units, of which 5.2% were vacant. The homeowner vacancy rate was 1.4% and the rental vacancy rate was 4.3%.

=== 2010 census ===
The 2010 United States census counted 2,135 people, 859 households, and 572 families in the CDP. The population density was 1,286.2 people per square mile (496.6 people/km^{2}). There were 949 housing units at an average density of 571.7 units per square mile (220.7 units/km^{2}). The racial makeup was 88.99% (1,900) White, 5.48% (117) Black or African American, 0.47% (10) Native American, 0.98% (21) Asian, 0.00% (0) Pacific Islander, 1.92% (41) from other races, and 2.15% (46) from two or more races. Hispanic or Latino people of any race were 7.26% (155) of the population.

Of the 859 households, 26.2% had children under the age of 18; 46.9% were married couples living together; 14.7% had a female householder with no husband present and 33.4% were non-families. Of all households, 25.3% were made up of individuals and 7.1% had someone living alone who was 65 years of age or older. The average household size was 2.46 and the average family size was 2.93.

20.6% of the population were under the age of 18, 8.9% from 18 to 24, 24.7% from 25 to 44, 33.0% from 45 to 64, and 12.9% who were 65 years of age or older. The median age was 41.7 years. For every 100 females, the population had 92.5 males. For every 100 females ages 18 and older there were 88.4 males.

=== 2000 census ===
At the 2000 census, there were 2,321 people, 892 households and 599 families residing in the CDP. The population density was 527.1 people/km^{2} (1,365 people/mi^{2}). There were 952 housing units at an average density of 216.2 units/km^{2} (560 units/mi^{2}). The racial makeup of the CDP was 91.25% White, 5.00% African American, 0.09% Native American, 0.73% Asian, 0.22% Pacific Islander, 0.78% from other races, and 1.94% from two or more races. Hispanic or Latino people of any race were 3.96% of the population.

There were 892 households, of which 33.9% had children under the age of 18 living with them, 49.2% were married couples living together, 14.5% had a female householder with no husband present, and 32.8% were non-families. 27.4% of all households were made up of individuals, and 10.3% had someone living alone who was 65 years of age or older. The average household size was 2.55 and the average family size was 3.12.

25.4% of the population were under the age of 18, 7.2% from 18 to 24, 30.9% from 25 to 44, 23.1% from 45 to 64, and 13.4% who were 65 years of age or older. The median age was 37 years. For every 100 females, there were 93.1 males. For every 100 females age 18 and over, there were 88.3 males.

The median household income was $52,628 and the median family income was $60,000. Males had a median income of $41,432 compared with $30,154 for females. The per capita income for the CDP was $23,477. About 4.9% of families and 6.8% of the population were below the poverty line, including 14.1% of those under age 18 and 3.0% of those age 65 or over. The Atlantic County Special Services School is a public school which services students with disabilities from the ages of 3 1/2 to 21.

== Education ==
Mays Landing is within two school districts: Hamilton Township Schools (elementary) and Greater Egg Harbor Regional High School District. Mays Landing is served by Oakcrest High School, part of the Greater Egg Harbor district. Schools operated by the Hamilton Township School District are William Davies Middle School, the George L. Hess Educational complex and the Shaner School.

The Atlantic County Institute of Technology, established in 1974 and located on a campus covering 58 acres (23 ha), provides vocational instruction to high school students and adults from across Atlantic County, and was one of eight schools in the state recognized in 2008 as a Blue Ribbon School by the United States Department of Education.

Saint Vincent de Paul Regional School is a Catholic elementary school in Mays Landing, serving students in pre-kindergarten through eighth grade since 1961 and operated under the jurisdiction of the Diocese of Camden.

Atlantic Cape Community College was the second community college to be established in New Jersey, and moved to its campus in Mays Landing in February 1968 where it now serves students from both Atlantic County and Cape May County.

== Transportation ==
NJ Transit provides bus service to Philadelphia on the 315 route and to Atlantic City on the 553 route.

== Winery ==
- Balic Winery

== Notable people ==
People who were born in, residents of, or otherwise closely associated with Mays Landing include:

- Mrs. L. Dow Balliett (1847–1929), writer, clubwoman
- Brandon Bell (born 1995), former linebacker for the Penn State Nittany Lions football team, signed by the Cincinnati Bengals in 2017
- Johnny Berchtold, actor
- Cory Bird (born 1978), football safety who played for the Indianapolis Colts
- Ilsley Boone (1879–1968), established and ran the national headquarters of the American Sunbathing Association at Sunshine Park (which operated 1931–1983) in Mays Landing
- Darhyl Camper (born 1990), singer-songwriter and record producer
- Suzette Charles (born 1963), singer and entertainer, Miss America 1984
- Carmen Cincotti (born 1992), competitive eater
- Mike Curcio (born 1957), former American football linebacker who played in the NFL for the Philadelphia Eagles and the Green Bay Packers
- Darren Drozdov (1969–2023), former wrestler for WWE and NFL player for the Denver Broncos
- Mae Faggs (1932–2000), track-and-field athlete who was a gold medalist in the Women's 4 × 100 meters relay at 1952 Summer Olympics
- Ronnie Faisst (born 1977), professional freestyle motocross and snow bikecross rider
- Bo Melton (born 1999), American football wide receiver for the Green Bay Packers
- Max Melton, American football cornerback for the Rutgers Scarlet Knights
- William Moore (1810–1878), served in the United States House of Representatives, where he represented New Jersey's 1st congressional district 1867–1871
- Sharon Kay Penman (1945–2021), historical novelist
- Graciela Rivera (1921–2011), first Puerto Rican to sing a lead role at the Metropolitan Opera
- Kanye Udoh, college football running back for the Liberty Flames
