= Bo Melton =

American football player (born 1999)

No. 16 – Green Bay Packers
- Position: Wide receiver
- Roster status: Active

Personal information
- Born: May 18, 1999 (age 27); Egg Harbor City, New Jersey, U.S.
- Listed height: 5 ft 11 in (1.80 m)
- Listed weight: 189 lb (86 kg)

Career information
- High school: Cedar Creek (Egg Harbor City)
- College: Rutgers (2017–2021)
- NFL draft: 2022: 7th round, 229th overall pick

Career history
- Seattle Seahawks (2022)*; Green Bay Packers (2022–present)
- * Offseason or practice squad member only

Career NFL statistics as of Week 10, 2026
- Receptions: 33
- Receiving yards: 450
- Receiving touchdowns: 2
- Rushing yards: 110
- Return yards: 882
- Stats at Pro Football Reference

Miles Bokeem Melton (born May 18, 1999) is an American professional football wide receiver for the Green Bay Packers of the National Football League (NFL). He played college football for the Rutgers Scarlet Knights, and was selected by the Seattle Seahawks in the seventh round of the 2022 NFL draft.

== Early life ==
Melton grew up in Mays Landing, New Jersey and attended Cedar Creek High School. As a senior, Melton caught 51 receptions for 766 yards and nine touchdowns and also rushed for 451 yards and seven touchdowns. He was rated a four-star recruit and committed to play college football at Rutgers from over 30 scholarship offers, including Michigan, Ohio State, Oregon, Penn State, Virginia Tech, Wisconsin, Nebraska, Maryland, and Pitt.

== College career ==
Melton played in 11 games as a freshman and had four receptions for 83 yards. He played in all 12 of Rutgers' games and caught 28 passes for 245 yards in his sophomore season. As a junior, Melton led the Scarlet Knights with 30 receptions and 427 receiving yards and caught two touchdown passes. In 2020, he again led the team with 47 catches and 638 receiving yards with six touchdown receptions and also rushed for two touchdowns and scored on a punt return. Melton decided to utilize the extra year of eligibility granted to college athletes who played in the 2020 season due to the coronavirus pandemic and return to Rutgers for a fifth season. He caught a career high 55 passes for 618 yards and three touchdowns in his final season. After the conclusion of his college career, Melton played in the 2022 Senior Bowl.

== Professional career ==
Pre-draft measurables
Height	Weight	Arm length	Hand span	Wingspan	40-yard dash	10-yard split	20-yard split	20-yard shuttle	Three-cone drill	Vertical jump	Broad jump	Bench press
5 ft 11 in (1.80 m)	189 lb (86 kg)	31 1/4 in (0.79 m)	9 in (0.23 m)	6 ft 4 1/2 in (1.94 m)	4.34 s	1.50 s	2.54 s	4.10 s	6.81 s	38.0 in (0.97 m)	10 ft 1 in (3.07 m)	18 reps
All values from NFL Combine/Pro Day

=== Seattle Seahawks ===
Melton was selected by the Seattle Seahawks in the seventh round, 229th overall, of the 2022 NFL draft. He was waived on August 30, 2022, and signed to the practice squad the next day.

=== Green Bay Packers ===
On December 27, 2022, Melton was signed to the active roster of the Green Bay Packers.

Melton was released on August 29, 2023, following final roster cuts and was signed to the Packers' practice squad the next day. He was signed to the active roster on November 22. Five days later, he was released. Melton was re-signed to the practice squad on November 29. He was elevated to the active roster for Week 16 and 17 in December. On December 31, he had a breakout game against the Minnesota Vikings with six receptions for 105 yards and a touchdown. Melton was signed to the active roster the following day. In the Packers' divisional round matchup against the San Francisco 49ers, Melton caught his only target for a 19-yard touchdown reception.

Prior to the 2025 NFL season, the Packers converted Melton into a cornerback. He made 16 appearances (one start) for Green Bay, recording four receptions for 107 yards and a touchdown; he also recorded four combined tackles. On January 7, 2026, Melton was placed on season-ending injured reserve due to a knee injury suffered in Week 18 against the Minnesota Vikings.

On June 2, 2026, it was announced that Melton would go back to playing wide receiver full-time. On September 11, Melton was waived by the Packers, and was subsequently re–signed to the team's practice squad. Three days later, Green Bay signed him to their active roster.

== NFL career statistics ==
Legend
**Bold**	Career high

=== Regular season ===
Year	Team	Games		Receiving					Fumbles	
Year	Team	GP	GS	Rec	Yds	Avg	Lng	TD	Fum	Lost
2023	GB	5	**1**	**16**	**218**	13.6	37	**1**	0	0
2024	GB	**17**	0	8	91	11.4	28	0	0	0
2025	GB	16	**1**	4	108	**26.8**	**45**	**1**	0	0
Total		38	2	28	416	14.9	45	2	0	0
Source: pro-football-reference.com

=== Postseason ===
Year	Team	Games		Receiving					Fumbles	
Year	Team	GP	GS	Rec	Yds	Avg	Lng	TD	Fum	Lost
2023	GB	**2**	0	**2**	**26**	13.0	**19**	**1**	0	0
2024	GB	1	0	1	16	**16.0**	16	0	0	0
Total		3	0	3	42	14.0	19	1	0	0
Source: pro-football-reference.com

== Personal life ==
Melton is a Christian. Melton's father, Gary, played football at Rutgers and his mother, Vicky, played on the women's basketball team. His younger brother, Max, is currently a cornerback for the Arizona Cardinals. His older sister, Jasmine Melton & brother, Gary Melton Jr. both live in South Jersey near his childhood home.
