= Oakcrest High School =

High school in Atlantic County, New Jersey, US

Location
- 1824 Dennis Foreman Drive; Mays Landing, Atlantic County, New Jersey 08330; United States; 39.451345°N 74.679689°W

Information
- Type: Public high school
- Established: September 1960
- School district: Greater Egg Harbor Regional High School District
- NCES School ID: 340606000124
- Principal: Mike Manning
- Faculty: 85.6 FTEs
- Grades: 9-12
- Enrollment: 936 (as of 2023–24)
- Student to teacher ratio: 10.9:1
- Colors: Royal blue gray
- Athletics conference: Cape-Atlantic League (general); West Jersey Football League (football)
- Team name: Falcons
- GEHRHSD: Absegami High School; Cedar Creek High School; Oakcrest High School
- Community served: Hamilton Township
- Website: www.gehrhsd.net/o/ohs

Oakcrest High School is a comprehensive four-year public high school located in Hamilton Township, in Atlantic County, in the U.S. state of New Jersey. The school is part of the Greater Egg Harbor Regional High School District, which includes three secondary schools that serve students from Egg Harbor City, Galloway Township, Hamilton Township and Mullica Township, together with students from Port Republic and Washington Township (in Burlington County) who attend as part of sending/receiving relationships.

The school serves students from Hamilton Township, though students from elsewhere in the district are eligible to apply to attend magnet programs hosted at Oakcrest. With the opening of Cedar Creek High School in Egg Harbor City in 2010, students from Mullica Township, Port Republic and Washington Township no longer attend Oakcrest High School.

As of the 2023–24 school year, the school had an enrollment of 936 students and 85.6 classroom teachers (on an FTE basis), for a student–teacher ratio of 10.9:1. There were 433 students (46.3% of enrollment) eligible for free lunch and 139 (14.9% of students) eligible for reduced-cost lunch.

== History ==
The district was established with the passage of a referendum in January 1957 by the five constituent municipalities of Egg Harbor City, Egg Harbor Township, Galloway Township, Hamilton Township and Mullica Township by a 5-1 margin that allocated $1.7 million (equivalent to $19.5 million in 2025) for the construction of what would become Oakcrest High School. The school, initially named Egg Harbor Regional High School opened in September 1960, with 150 students from Hamilton Township shifted out of Vineland High School.

The school was renamed as Oakcrest High School. The school name was chosen based on its site on the crest of a hill amid oak trees.

== Awards, recognition and rankings ==
The school was the 197th-ranked public high school in New Jersey out of 339 schools statewide in New Jersey Monthly magazine's September 2014 cover story on the state's "Top Public High Schools", using a new ranking methodology. The school had been ranked 247th in the state of 328 schools in 2012, after being ranked 244th in 2010 out of 322 schools listed. The magazine ranked the school 254th in 2008 out of 316 schools. The school was ranked 232nd in the magazine's September 2006 issue, which surveyed 316 schools across the state. Schooldigger.com ranked the school as 254th out of 376 public high schools statewide in its 2010 rankings (an increase of 5 positions from the 2009 rank) which were based on the combined percentage of students classified as proficient or above proficient on the language arts literacy and mathematics components of the High School Proficiency Assessment (HSPA).

The school has a variety of programs, including Special Needs, a "High School-to-Work" program, College Preparatory, Advanced Placement (AP), and Performing Arts training.

For the 2005-06 school year, Oakcrest High School was recognized with the "Best Practices Award" by the New Jersey Department of Education for its "A Proactive Approach to Guidance and Career Services" Career Education program.

Oakcrest's Academic Challenge Team was successful at the Buena Regional High School and Egg Harbor Township High School competitions in spring 2006, the team finished first overall at the Gateway Toyota Academic Challenge at Monsignor Donovan High School in Toms River by defeating perennial competitor East Brunswick High School in the final round.

In the 2011 "Ranking America's High Schools" issue by The Washington Post, the school was ranked 66th in New Jersey and 1,918th nationwide.

== Athletics ==
The Oakcrest High School Falcons compete in the Atlantic Division of the Cape-Atlantic League, an athletic conference that includes public and private high schools located in Atlantic, Cape May, Cumberland and Gloucester counties, operating under the aegis of the New Jersey State Interscholastic Athletic Association (NJSIAA). With 577 students in grades 10-12, the school was classified by the NJSIAA for the 2022–24 school years as Group II South for most athletic competition purposes. The football team competes in the United Division of the 94-team West Jersey Football League superconference and was classified by the NJSIAA as Group III South for football for 2024–2026, which included schools with 695 to 882 students. School colors are royal blue and gray to represent the location in Pine Barrens.

The school offers many sports to its students including football, fall cheerleading, field hockey, soccer, tennis, basketball, winter cheerleading, lacrosse, wrestling, crew, track and field, cross country running, track indoor, powerlifting, volleyball, softball, golf, swim, and baseball.

The boys' wrestling team won the South Jersey Group III state sectional championship in 1992 and 1993.

The girls' outdoor track and field team won the Group III state championships in 1997.

The boys' track team won the Group III indoor relay championships in 2011, 2012 and 2013

The boys' outdoor track and field team won the Group IV state championships in 2011 and the Group III title in 2012.

== Administration ==
The school's principal is Mike Manning. His administration includes three assistant principals.

== Notable alumni ==
- Brandon Bell (born 1995, class of 2013), linebacker for the Penn State Nittany Lions football team
- Colin Bell (born 1981, class of 1999), member of the New Jersey Senate who represented the 2nd Legislative District
- Johnny Berchtold (born 1994), actor
- Cory Bird (born 1978, class of 1996), American football safety who played in the NFL for the Indianapolis Colts
- Darhyl Camper (born 1990, class of 2008), singer-songwriter and record producer
- Carmen Cincotti (born 1992, class of 2011), competitive eater
- Mike Curcio (born 1957, class of 1975), former American football linebacker who played in the NFL for the Philadelphia Eagles and the Green Bay Packers
- Darren Drozdov (born 1969), former NFL player for the Denver Broncos and wrestler in the then WWF (now WWE)
- Ronnie Faisst (born 1977, class of 1995), professional freestyle motocross and snow bikecross rider
- Day Gardner, crowned Miss Delaware 1976, she became the first black woman to place as a semi-finalist in the Miss America Pageant
- Cheryl Hamilton (born 1949/50), gymnastics judge
- Shameka Marshall (born 1983, class of 2001), long jumper who won the gold medal at the 2007 NACAC Championships in Athletics
- Cathy Rush (born 1947), former women's basketball program head coach at Immaculata University who led the team to three consecutive AIAW national titles from 1972-1974
- Cody Stashak (born 1994), professional baseball pitcher for the Minnesota Twins

== Notable faculty ==
- Doug Colman (born 1973), former NFL linebacker who began his coaching career at Oakcrest
- Bill Manlove (born 1933), College Football Hall of Fame head coach who coached the Oakcrest team in 1965 and 1966
