= Atlantic City, New Jersey =

City in Atlantic County, New Jersey, US

- City
- City of Atlantic City
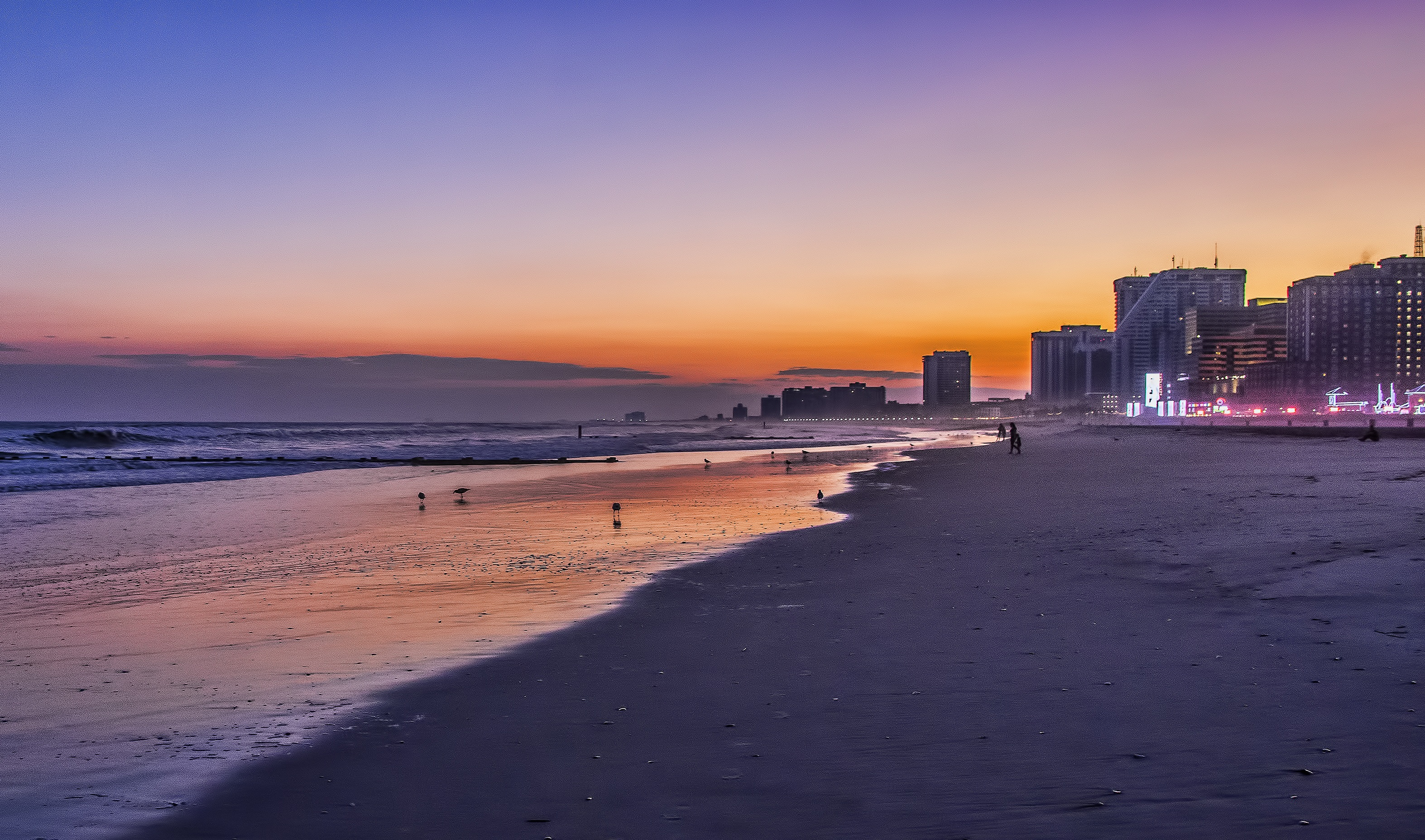
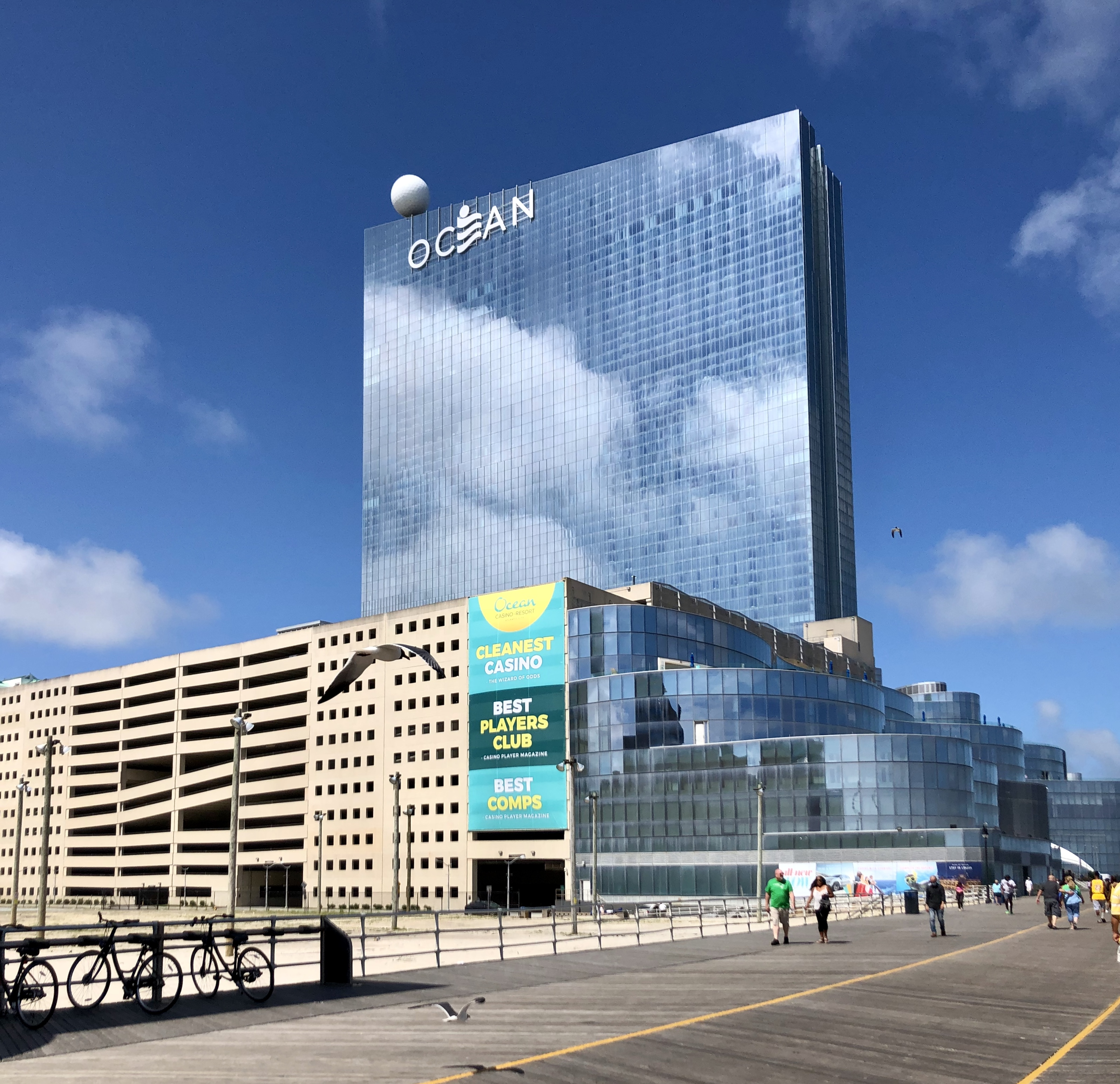
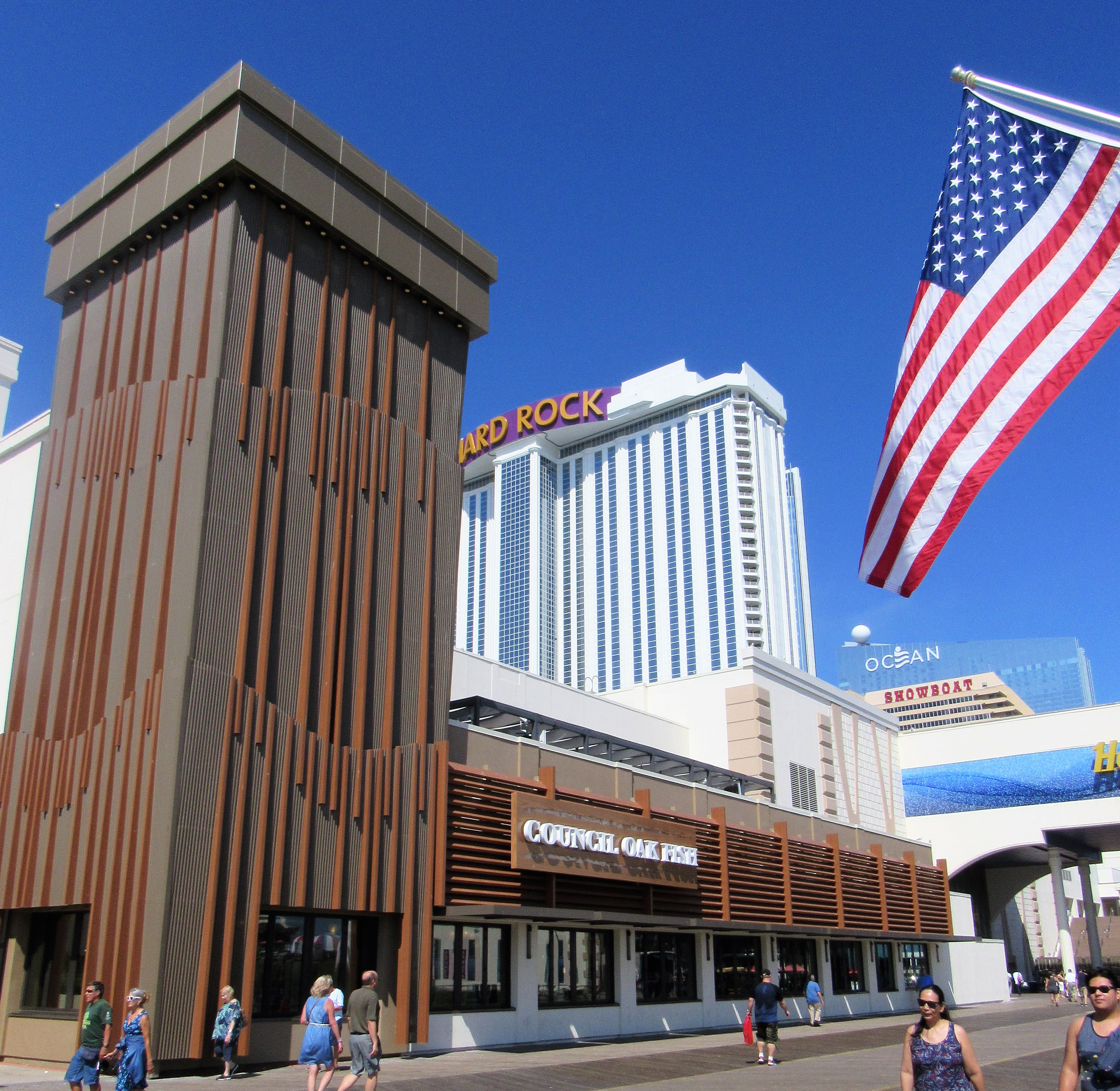
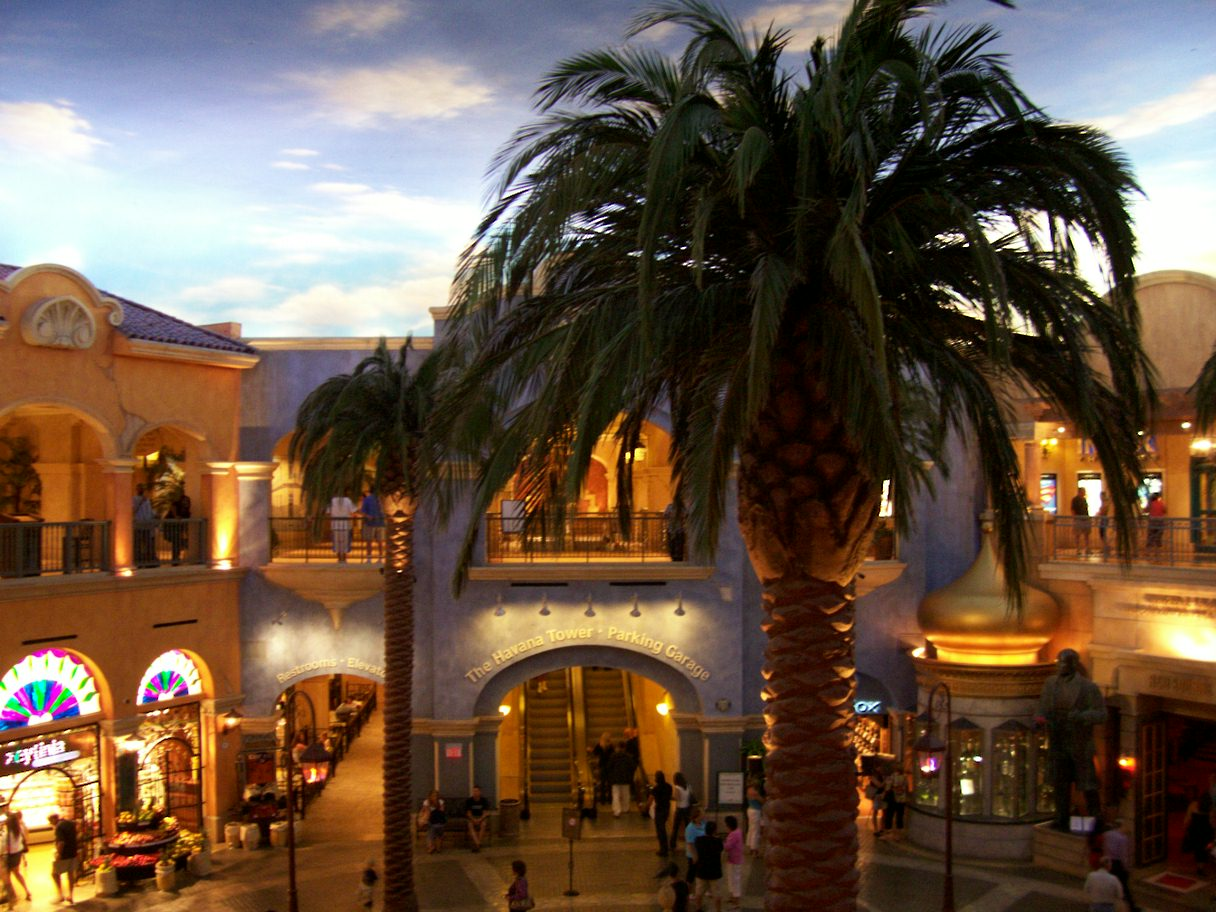
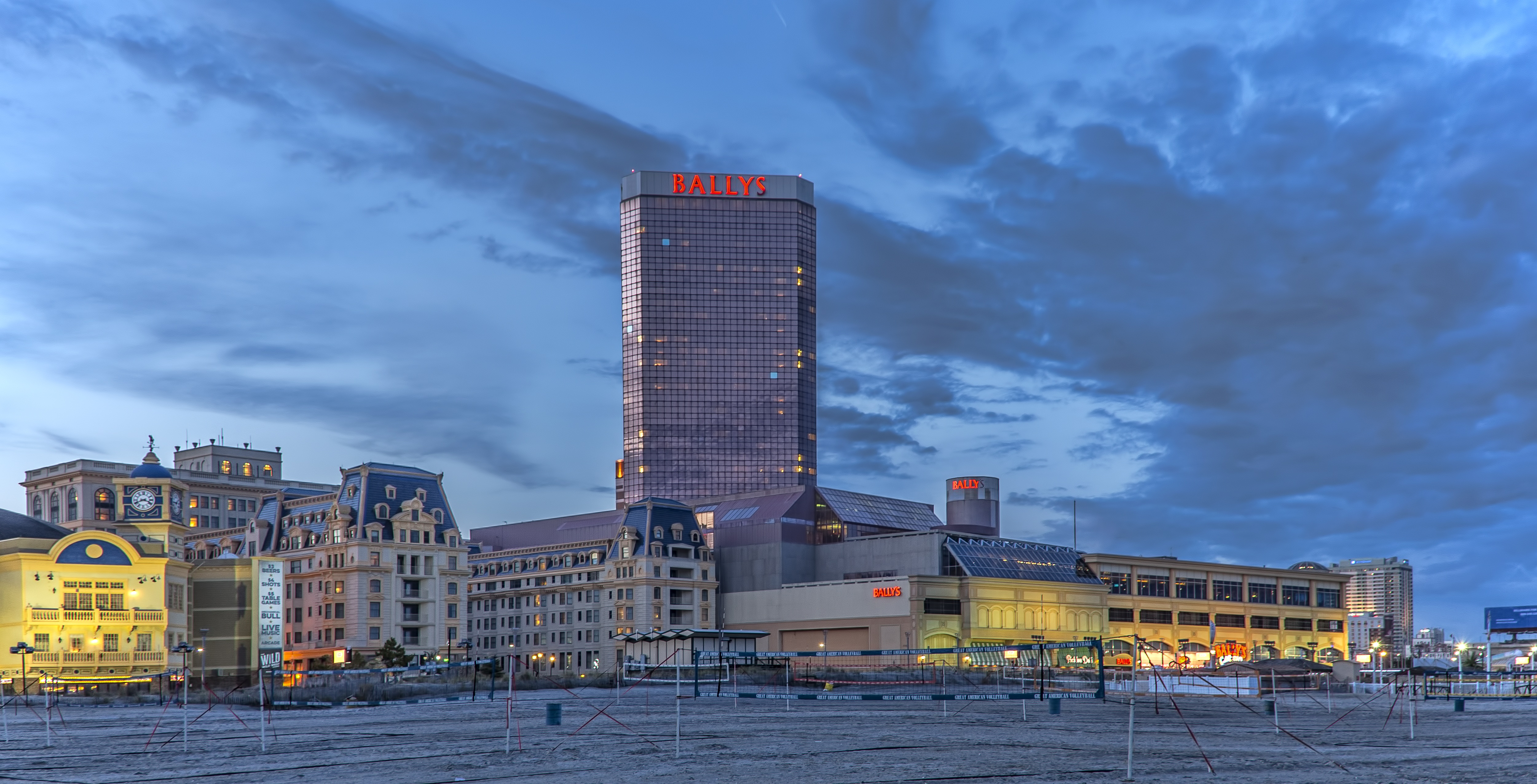
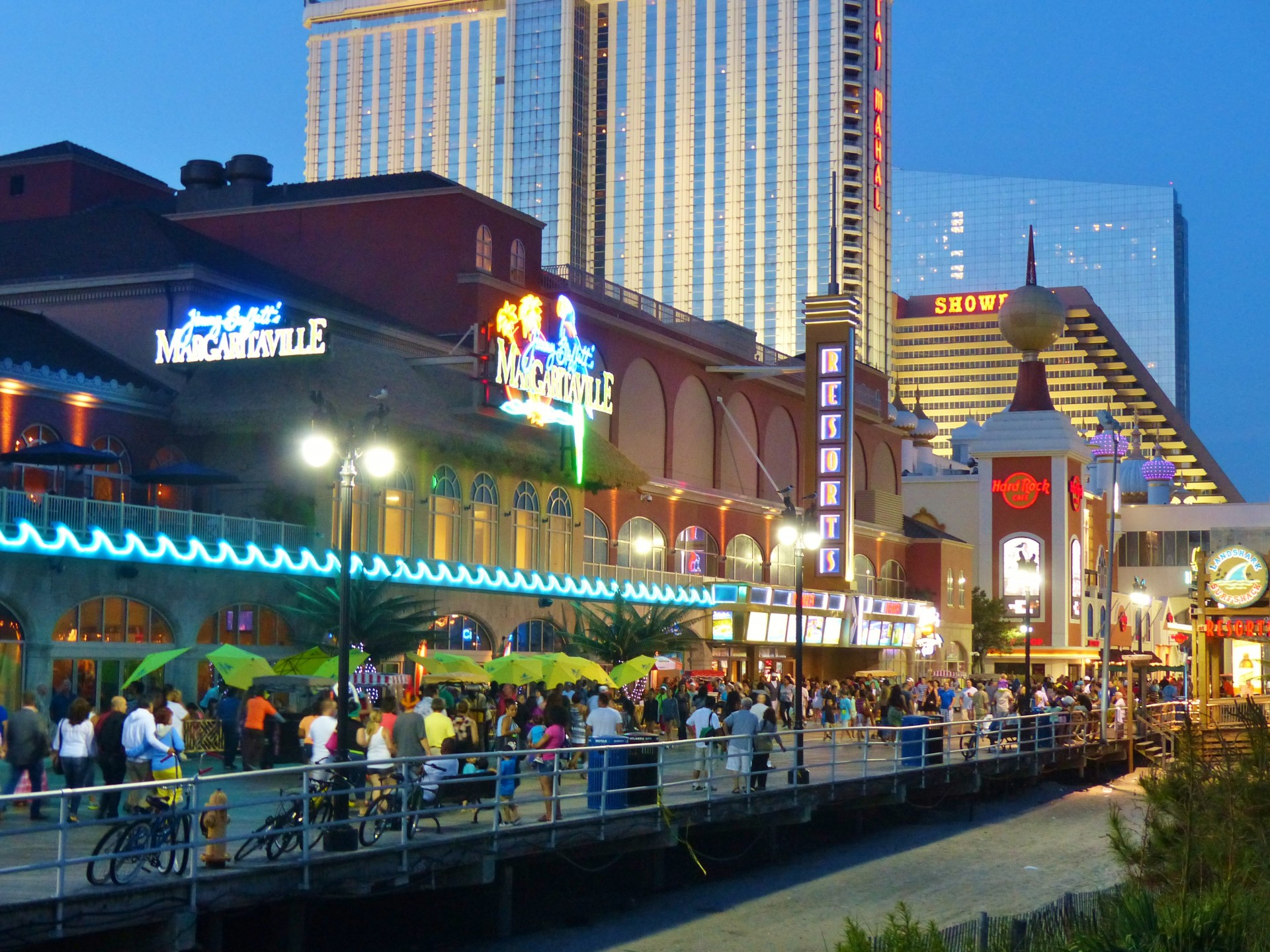
- Sunset on the beach at Atlantic City Ocean Casino Resort Hard Rock Hotel & Casino Atlantic City The Quarter at Tropicana Bally's Atlantic City Nightlife on the Atlantic City Boardwalk

- Flag Coat of arms Logo
- Nicknames: Monopoly City, Vegas East, "The World's Famous Playground"
- Motto: Consilio et Prudentia (Latin) "By Counsel and Wisdom"
- Interactive map of Atlantic City, New Jersey
- Location in Atlantic County Location in New Jersey Location in the United States
- Coordinates: 39°21′45″N 74°25′30″W
- Country: United States
- State: New Jersey
- County: Atlantic
- Incorporated: May 1, 1854

Government
  - Type: Faulkner Act (mayor–council)
  - Body: City Council
  - Mayor: Marty Small Sr. (D, December 31, 2029)
  - City Council: Members: Ward 1: Aaron "Sporty" Randolph (D); Ward 2: Latoya Dunston (D); Ward 3: Kaleem Shabazz (D); Ward 4: George "Animal" Crouch (D); Ward 5: Maria Lacca (R); Ward 6: Jesse O. Kurtz (R); At-Large: Patricia Bailey (D); At-Large: Stephanie Marshall (D); At-Large: Mohammed Suhel Ahmed (D)
  - Administrator: Anthony Swan
  - Municipal clerk: Paula Geletei

Area
  - City: 17.22 sq mi (44.59 km^{2})
  - Land: 10.76 sq mi (27.87 km^{2})
  - Water: 6.46 sq mi (16.72 km^{2}) 37.50%
  - Rank: 165th of 565 in state 8th of 23 in county
- Elevation: 7 ft (2.1 m)

Population (2020)
  - City: 38,497
  - Estimate (2023): 38,464
  - Rank: 61st of 565 in state 2nd of 23 in county
  - Density: 3,577.8/sq mi (1,381.4/km^{2})
  - Rank: 188th of 565 in state 4th of 23 in county
  - Urban: 294,921 (US: 138th)
  - Urban density: 1,811/sq mi (699.1/km^{2})
  - Metro: 274,534 (US: 179th)
- Time zone: UTC−05:00 (EST)
  - Summer (DST): UTC−04:00 (Eastern (EDT))
- ZIP Codes: 08401–08406
- Area code: 609
- FIPS code: 3400102080
- GNIS feature ID: 0885142
- Website: www.acnj.gov

Atlantic City, sometimes referred to by its initials A.C., is a seaside resort city in Atlantic County, in the U.S. state of New Jersey.

Atlantic City comprises the second half of the Atlantic City–Hammonton metropolitan statistical area, which encompasses those cities and all of Atlantic County for statistical purposes. Both Atlantic City and Hammonton, as well as the surrounding Atlantic County, have cultural ties to Philadelphia and constitute part of the larger Philadelphia combined statistical area, along with other smaller South Jersey metros such as Vineland–Bridgeton (Cumberland County) and Ocean City (Cape May County).

Located in South Jersey on Absecon Island and known for its casinos, nightlife, boardwalk, and Atlantic Ocean beaches and coastline, the city is prominently known as the "Las Vegas of the East Coast" and inspired the U.S. version of the board game Monopoly, which uses various Atlantic City street names and destinations in the game. New Jersey voters legalized casino gambling in Atlantic City in 1976, and the first casino opened two years later. From 1921 to 2004, Atlantic City hosted the Miss America pageant, which later returned to the city from 2013 to 2018.

As of the 2020 census, the city had a population of 38,497, a decline of 1,061 (c. 2.7%) from the 2010 census count of 39,558, which in turn reflected a decrease of 959 (c. 2.4%) from the 40,517 counted in the 2000 census.

The city was incorporated on May 1, 1854, from portions of Egg Harbor Township and Galloway Township. It is located on Absecon Island and borders Absecon, Brigantine, Egg Harbor Township, Galloway Township, Pleasantville, Ventnor City, and the Atlantic Ocean.

== History ==
Prior to Atlantic City's founding, the region served as a summer home for the Lenape, a Native American tribe. While the date of European settlement in present-day Atlantic City is not precisely determined, it is commonly thought that it was in 1783, when Jeremiah Leeds built and occupied a year-round home there.

=== 19th century ===
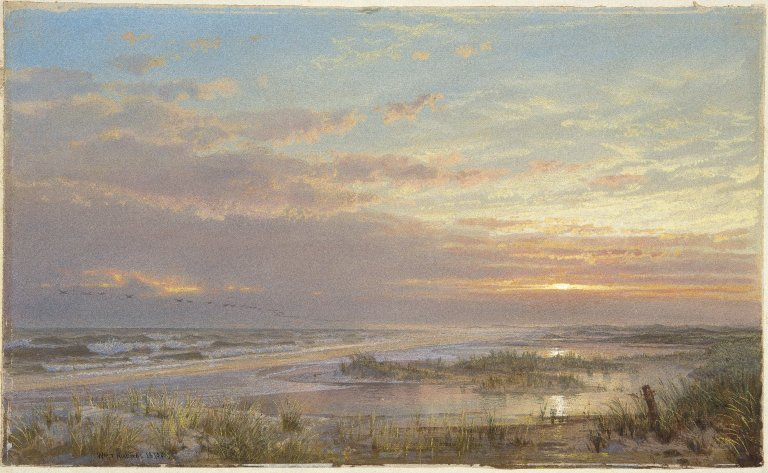
A High Tide at Atlantic City, a painting by William Trost Richards, now housed in Brooklyn Museum

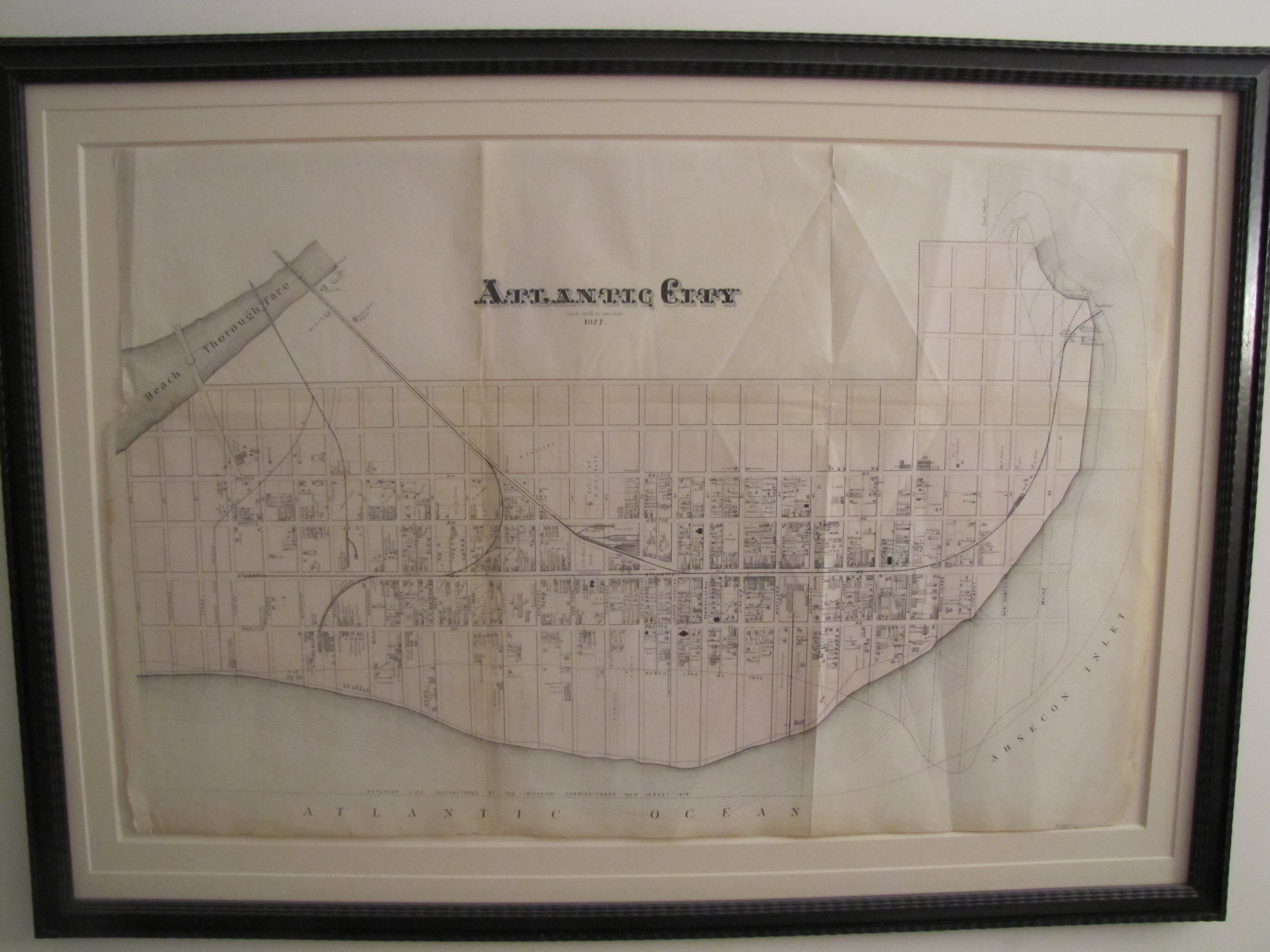
Atlantic City, 1877

In 1850, present-day Atlantic City was developed into a resort town. Three years later, in early 1853, it was named Atlantic City.

Because of its location in South Jersey, which hugs the Atlantic Ocean between marshlands and islands, Atlantic City was then viewed by developers as prime real estate and a potential resort town. In 1853, the city's first commercial hotel, the Belloe House, was built at the intersection of Massachusetts and Atlantic Avenues.

The following year, in 1854, the city was incorporated. The same year, train service began on the Camden and Atlantic Railroad. Built on the edge of the bay, this served as the direct link of this remote parcel of land with Philadelphia, the second-most populous city in the United States at the time and the largest city in Pennsylvania. The same year, construction of the Absecon Lighthouse, designed by George Meade of the Corps of Topographical Engineers, was approved, with work initiated the next year.

By 1874, almost 500,000 passengers a year were coming to Atlantic City by rail. In Boardwalk Empire: The Birth, High Times, and Corruption of Atlantic City, "Atlantic City's Godfather" Jonathan Pitney, known as the "Father of Atlantic City", initially sought to develop Atlantic City as a health resort. Pitney persuaded municipal authorities that a railroad to the beach in Atlantic City would be beneficial. His successful business relationship with Samuel Richards, an entrepreneur and member of what was then the most influential family in South Jersey, was designed to construct the railroad with the first 600 riders, who "were chosen carefully by Samuel Richards and Jonathan Pitney":

After arriving in Atlantic City, a second train brought the visitors to the door of the resort's first public lodging, the United States Hotel. The hotel was owned by the railroad. It was a sprawling, four-story structure built to house 2,000 guests. It opened while it was still under construction, with only one wing standing, and even that wasn't completed. By year's end, when it was fully constructed, the United States Hotel was not only the first hotel in Atlantic City but also the largest in the nation. Its rooms totaled more than 600, and its grounds covered some 14 acres.

The first boardwalk was built in 1870 along a portion of the beach in an effort to help hotel owners keep sand out of their lobbies. Businesses were restricted and the boardwalk was removed each year at the end of the peak season. Because of its effectiveness and popularity, the boardwalk was expanded in length and width, and modified several times in subsequent years.

Prior to the destructive 1944 Great Atlantic Hurricane, the historic length of the boardwalk was about 7 mi (11 km) and it extended from Atlantic City to Longport, through Ventnor and Margate.

The first road connecting the city to the mainland at Pleasantville was completed in 1870 and charged a 30-cent toll. Albany Avenue was the first road to the mainland available without a toll.

By 1878, because of the growing popularity of the city, one railroad line could no longer keep up with demand. Soon, the Philadelphia and Atlantic City Railway was also constructed to transport tourists to Atlantic City. At this point massive hotels like the United States Hotel and Surf House, as well as smaller rooming houses, had sprung up all over town. The United States Hotel took up a full city block between Atlantic, Pacific, Delaware, and Maryland Avenues. These hotels were not only impressive in size, but featured the most up-to-date amenities, and were considered quite luxurious for their time.

In 1883, salt water taffy was conceived in Atlantic City by David Bradley. The traditional story is that Bradley's shop close to the beach was flooded with ocean water after a storm, soaking his taffy. He sold the "salt water taffy" to a girl, who walked down to the beach to show her friends. Bradley's mother was in the back of the store when the sale was made, and loved the name, giving the candy its name.

=== 20th century ===
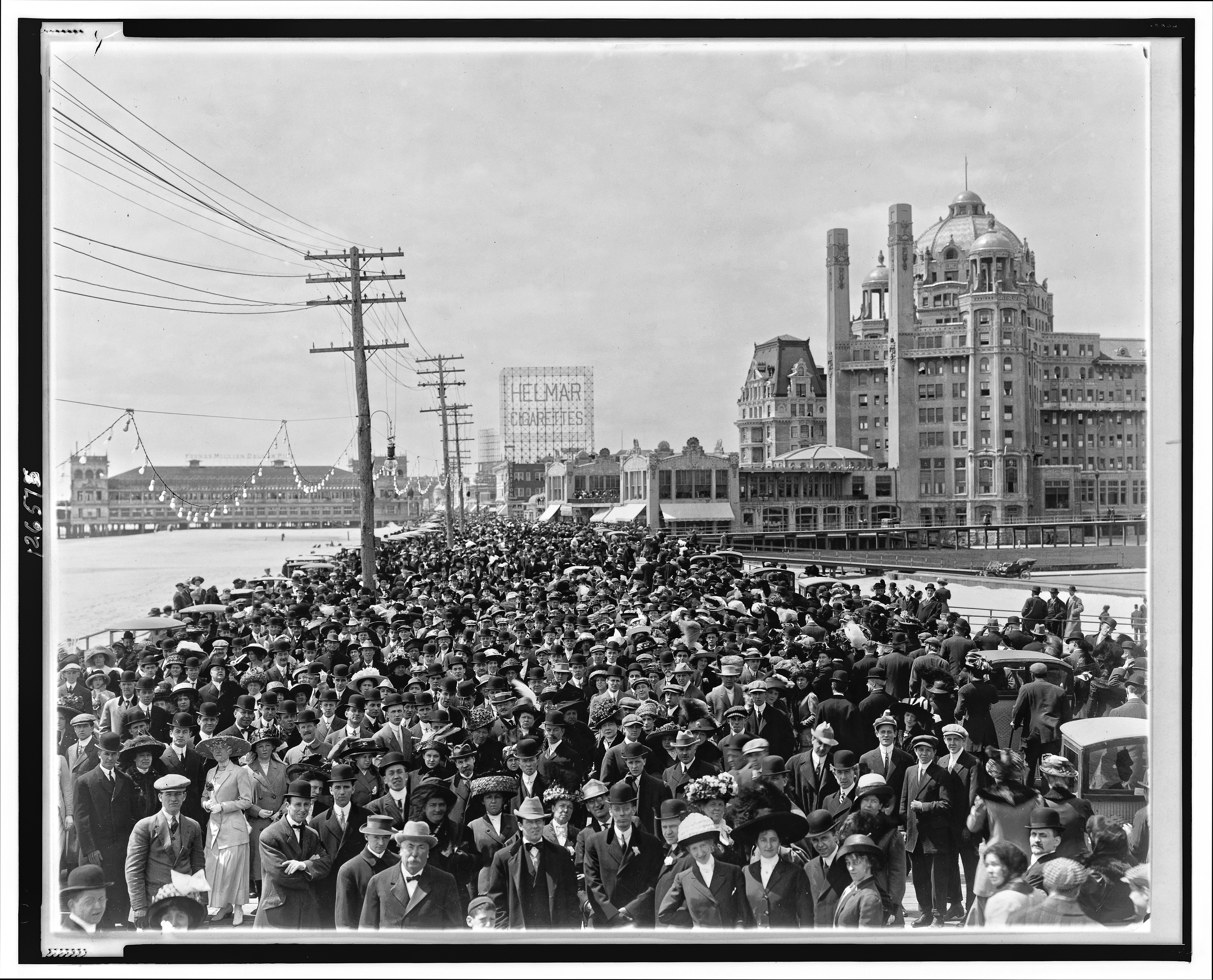
Atlantic City Boardwalk crowd in front of Marlborough-Blenheim Hotel in 1911

In the early 20th century, Atlantic City experienced a radical building boom. Many of the modest boarding houses that dotted the boardwalk were replaced with large hotels. Two of the city's most distinctive hotels were the Marlborough-Blenheim Hotel and the Traymore Hotel.

Expansion of the city was driven by the relative ease of transport to and from Philadelphia. The fastest express trains traveled from one end to the other in about an hour, whereas competing towns on the Jersey Shore required an additional 30–90 minutes each way.

In 1902, Josiah White III bought a parcel of land near Ohio Avenue and the boardwalk, where he started construction and built the Queen Anne style Marlborough House. The hotel was a success. In 1905, he chose to expand the hotel and bought another parcel of land adjacent to his Marlborough House. In an effort to make his new hotel a source of conversation, White hired the architectural firm of Price and McLanahan. The firm made use of reinforced concrete, a new building material invented by Jean-Louis Lambot in 1848, and Joseph Monier received the patent in 1867. The hotel's Spanish and Moorish themes, capped off with its signature dome and chimneys, represented a step forward from other hotels that had a classically designed influence. White named the new hotel the Blenheim and merged the two hotels into the Marlborough-Blenheim. Bally's Atlantic City was later constructed at this location.

The Traymore Hotel was located at the corner of Illinois Avenue and the boardwalk. Constructed in 1879 as a small boarding house, the hotel grew through a series of uncoordinated expansions. By 1914, the hotel's owner, Daniel White, Josiah White's half-brother, taking a hint from the Marlborough-Blenheim, commissioned the firm of Price and McLanahan to build an even bigger hotel to replace the original wooden structure. Rising 16 stories, the tan brick and gold-capped hotel would become one of the city's best-known landmarks. The hotel made use of ocean-facing hotel rooms by jutting its wings farther from the main portion of the hotel along Pacific Avenue. It was demolished in 1972.

Haddon Hall Hotel depicted on a mid-1930s postcard

One by one, additional large hotels were constructed along the boardwalk, including the Brighton, Chelsea, Shelburne, Ambassador, Ritz Carlton, Mayflower, Madison House, and the Breakers. The Quaker-owned Chalfonte House, opened in 1868, and Haddon House, opened in 1869, flanked North Carolina Avenue at the beach end. Over the years, their original wood-frame structures would be enlarged, and even moved closer to the beach. The modern Chalfonte Hotel, eight stories tall, opened in 1904. The modern Haddon Hall was built in stages and was completed in 1929, at eleven stories. By this time, they were under the same ownership and merged into the Chalfonte-Haddon Hall Hotel, becoming the city's largest hotel with nearly 1,000 rooms.

By 1930, The Claridge Hotel, the city's last large hotel constructed before the casino era, opened its doors. The 480-room Claridge was built by a partnership that included renowned Philadelphia contractor John McShain. At 24 stories and 370 stone (5,200 lb; 2,300 kg) in height, it would become known as the "Skyscraper by the Sea".

Enoch L. "Nucky" Johnson, political boss of Atlantic City

With tourism peaking in the 1920s, the period is often considered by historians to be Atlantic City's golden age. During Prohibition, which was enacted nationally in 1919 and lasted until 1933, much liquor was consumed and gambling regularly took place in the back rooms of nightclubs and restaurants. During Prohibition, racketeer and political boss Enoch L. "Nucky" Johnson rose to power. Prohibition was largely unenforced in Atlantic City. Because alcohol that had been smuggled into the city with the implicit approval of local officials, it was easily obtained at restaurants and other establishments, and the resort's popularity grew further. The city then dubbed itself as "The World's Playground". Nucky Johnson's income, which reached as much as $500,000 annually, came from the kickbacks he took on illegal liquor, gambling and prostitution operating in the city, as well as from kickbacks on construction projects.

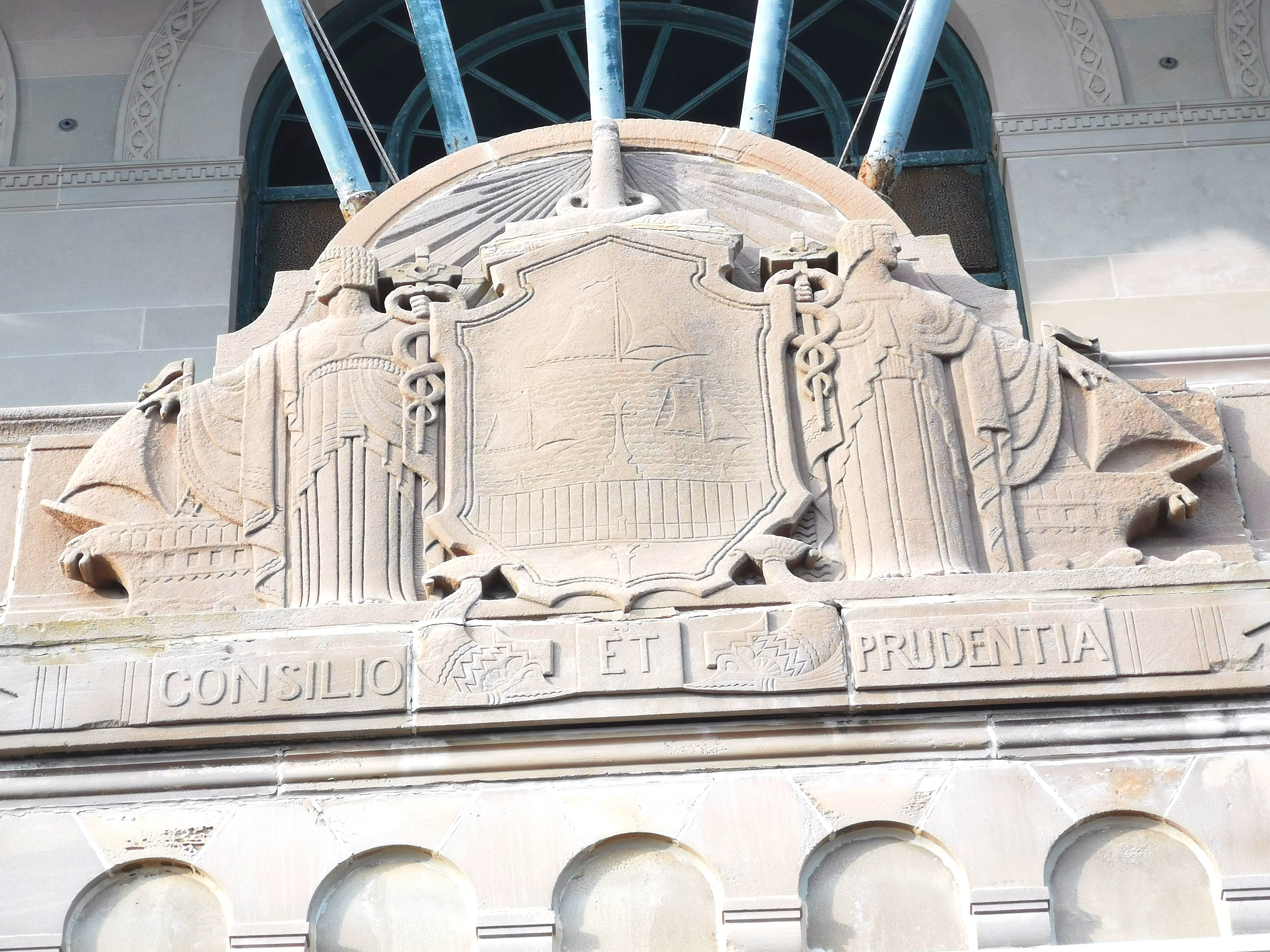
Consilio et prudentia, Atlantic City's motto, along with its coat of arms on historic Boardwalk Hall, built during prohibition, which lasted from 1919 to 1933

During this time, Atlantic City was led by mayor Edward L. Bader, known for his contributions to the construction, athletics and aviation of Atlantic City. Despite opposition, he had Atlantic City purchase the land that became the city's municipal airport and high school football stadium, both of which were later named Bader Field in his honor. He led the initiative, in 1923, to construct the Atlantic City High School at Albany and Atlantic Avenues. Bader, in November 1923, initiated a public referendum, during the general election, at which time residents approved the construction of a Convention Center. The city passed an ordinance approving a bond issue for $1.5 million to be used for the purchase of land for Convention Hall, now known as the Boardwalk Hall, finalized on September 30, 1924. Bader was also a driving force behind the creation of the Miss America competition.

In May 1929, Johnson hosted a conference for organized crime figures from all across America that created a National Crime Syndicate. The men who called this meeting were Masseria family lieutenant Charles "Lucky" Luciano and former Chicago South Side Gang boss Johnny "the Fox" Torrio, with heads of the Bugs and Meyer Mob, Meyer Lansky and Benjamin Siegel, being used as muscle for the meeting.

Gangster and businessman Al Capone attended the conference and was photographed walking along the Atlantic City boardwalk with Johnson.

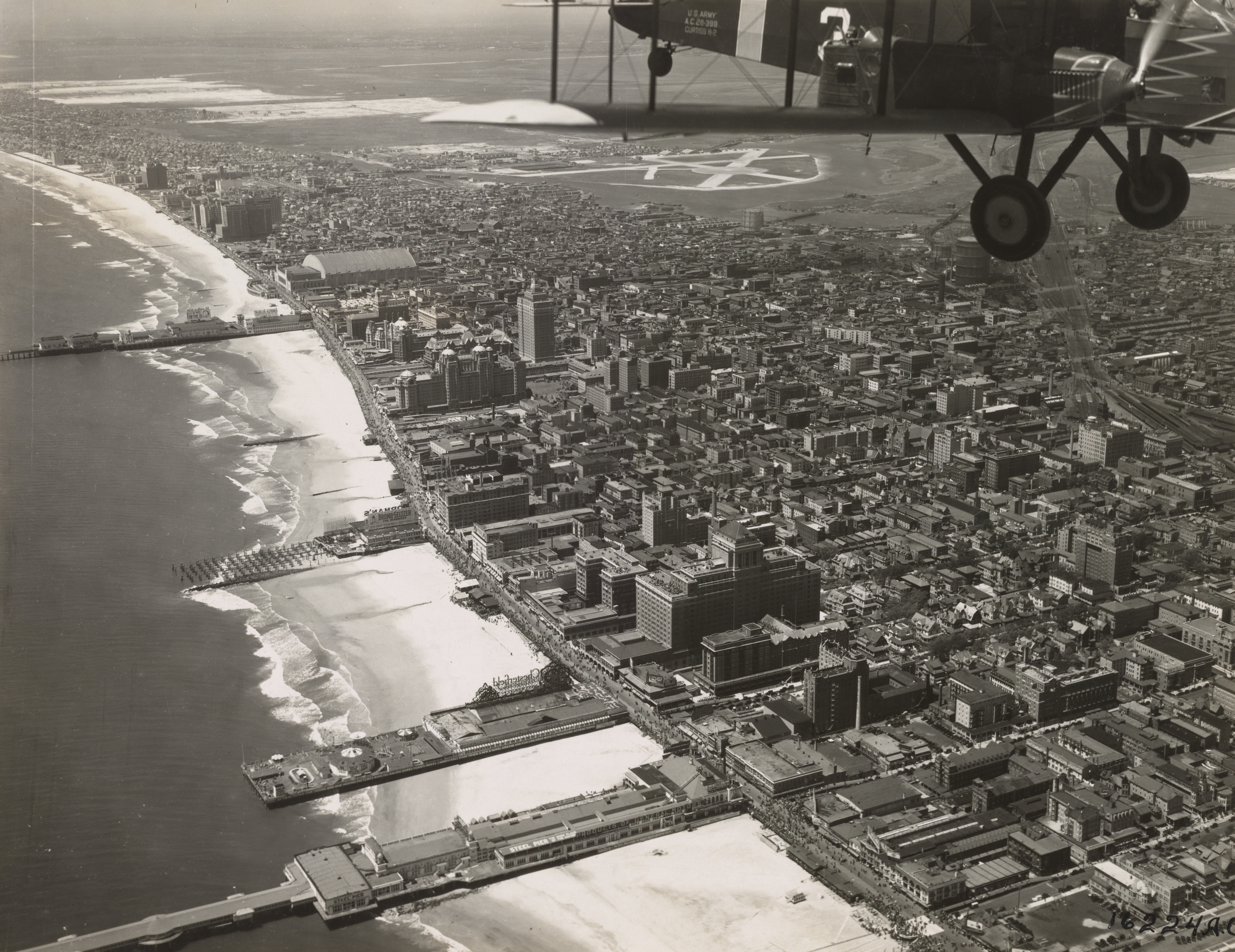
1931 aerial photo of Atlantic City boardwalk and piers.

The 1930s through the 1960s were a heyday for nightclub entertainment. Popular venues on the white-populated south side included the 500 Club, the Clicquot Club, and the Jockey Club. In the Northside neighborhood, home to African Americans in the racially segregated city, a black entertainment district reigned on Kentucky Avenue.

Four major nightclubs, Club Harlem, the Paradise Club, Grace's Little Belmont, and Wonder Gardens, drew both black and white patrons. During the summer tourist season, jazz and R&B music could be heard into the wee hours of the morning. Soul food restaurants and ribs joints also lined Kentucky Avenue, including Wash's Restaurant, Jerry's and Sap's.

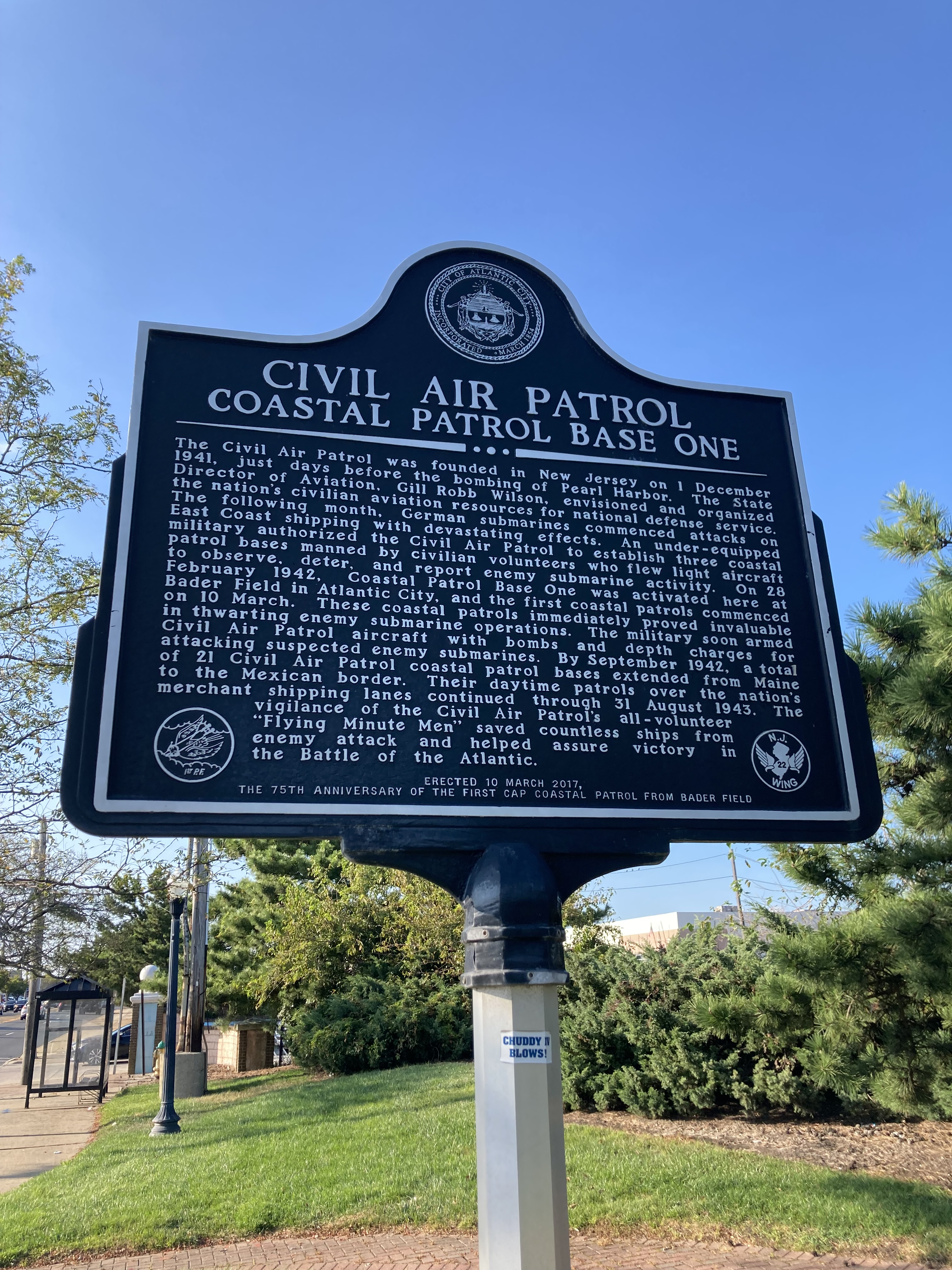
Marker to the Civil Air Patrol, Bader Field, Atlantic City

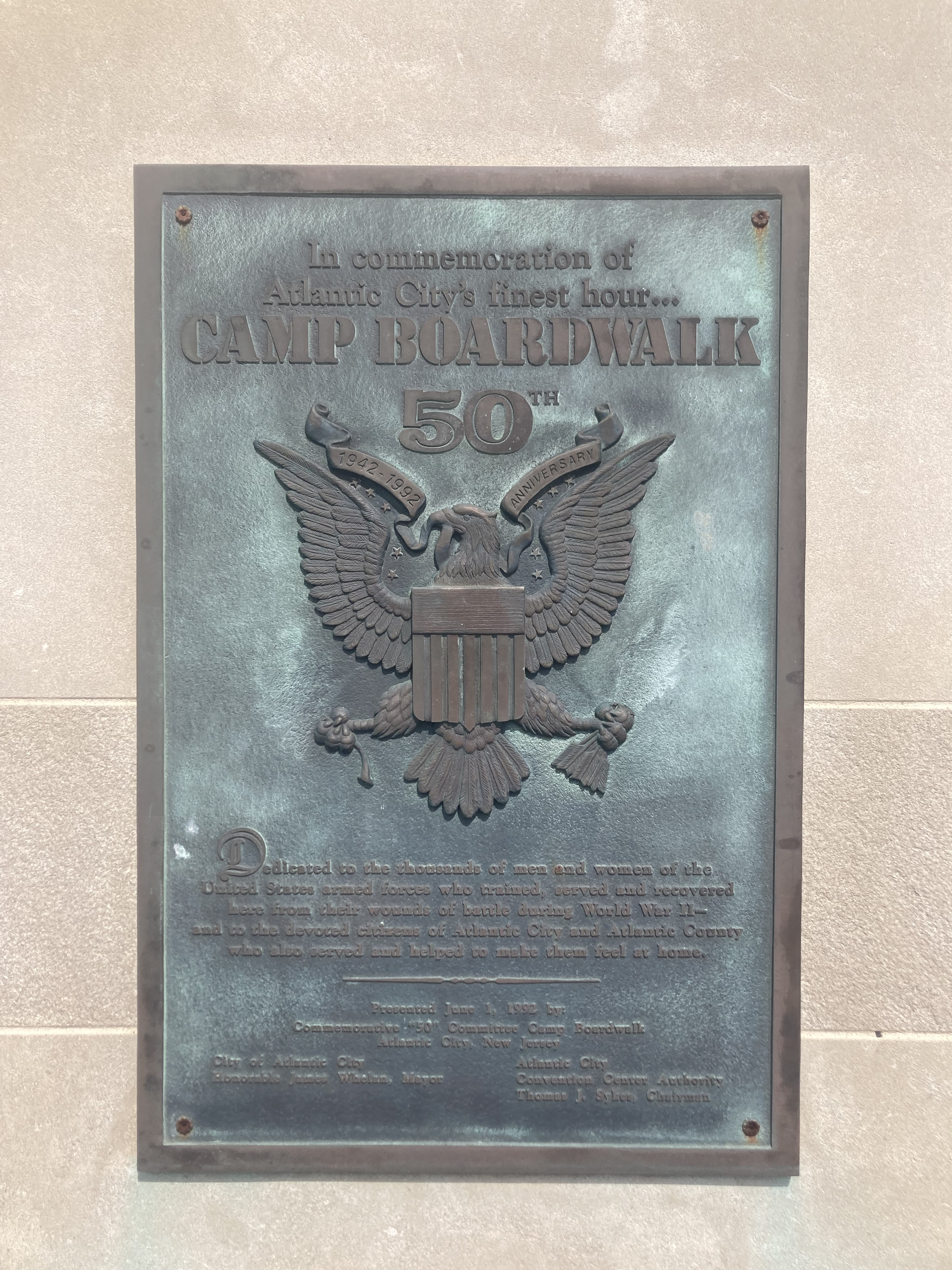
Plaque in Atlantic City for World War II Service

Like many older East Coast cities after World War II, Atlantic City became plagued with poverty, crime, corruption, white flight and general economic decline in the mid-to-late 20th century. The neighborhood known as the "Inlet" became particularly impoverished. The reasons for the resort's decline were multi-layered. First, the automobile became more readily available to many Americans after the war. Atlantic City had initially relied upon visitors coming by train and staying for a couple of weeks. The car allowed them to come and go as they pleased, and many people would spend only a few days, rather than weeks. The advent of suburbia also played a significant role. With many families moving to their own private houses, luxuries such as home air conditioning and swimming pools diminished their interest in flocking to the luxury beach resorts during the hot summer. Finally, the rise of relatively cheap jet airline service allowed visitors to travel to year-round resort places such as Miami Beach and the Bahamas.

The city hosted the 1964 Democratic National Convention which nominated Lyndon Johnson for president and Hubert Humphrey as vice president. The convention and the press coverage it generated, however, cast a harsh light on Atlantic City, which by then was in the midst of a long period of economic decline. Many felt that the friendship between Johnson and Governor of New Jersey Richard J. Hughes led Atlantic City to host the Democratic Convention.

By the late 1960s, many of the resort's once great hotels were suffering from high vacancy rates. Most of them were either shut down, converted to cheap apartments, or converted to nursing home facilities by the end of the decade. Prior to and during the advent of legalized gambling, many of these hotels were demolished. The Breakers, The Chelsea, the Brighton, the Shelburne, the Mayflower, the Traymore and the Marlborough-Blenheim were demolished in the 1970s and 1980s. Of the many pre-casino resorts that bordered the boardwalk, only the Claridge, the Dennis, the Ritz-Carlton, and the Haddon Hall survive to this day as parts of Bally's Atlantic City, a condo complex, and Resorts Atlantic City. The old Ambassador Hotel was purchased by Ramada in 1978 and was gutted to become the Tropicana Casino and Resort Atlantic City, only reusing the steelwork of the original building. Smaller hotels off the boardwalk, such as the Madison also survived.

==== Legalized gambling ====
In an effort to revitalize the city, New Jersey voters in 1976 passed a referendum approving casino gambling for Atlantic City; this came after a 1974 referendum on legalized gambling failed to pass. Immediately after the legislation passed, the owners of the Chalfonte-Haddon Hall Hotel began converting it into the Resorts International. It was the first legal casino in the eastern United States when it opened on May 26, 1978.

Other casinos were soon constructed along the Boardwalk and, later, in the marina district. The introduction of gambling did not, however, quickly eliminate many of the urban problems that plagued Atlantic City. Many people have suggested that it only served to exacerbate those problems, as attested to by the stark contrast between tourism intensive areas and the adjacent impoverished working-class neighborhoods.

Mike Tyson fought most of his fights in Atlantic City in the 1980s, which helped Atlantic City achieve national attention as a gambling resort and vacation destination. Other entertainment, including sporting matches and live music, became popular at hotel casinos.

Several highrise condominiums were built for use as permanent residences or second homes. By the end of the decade, it was one of the most popular tourist destinations in the United States.

=== 21st century ===
==== Legalized sports betting ====
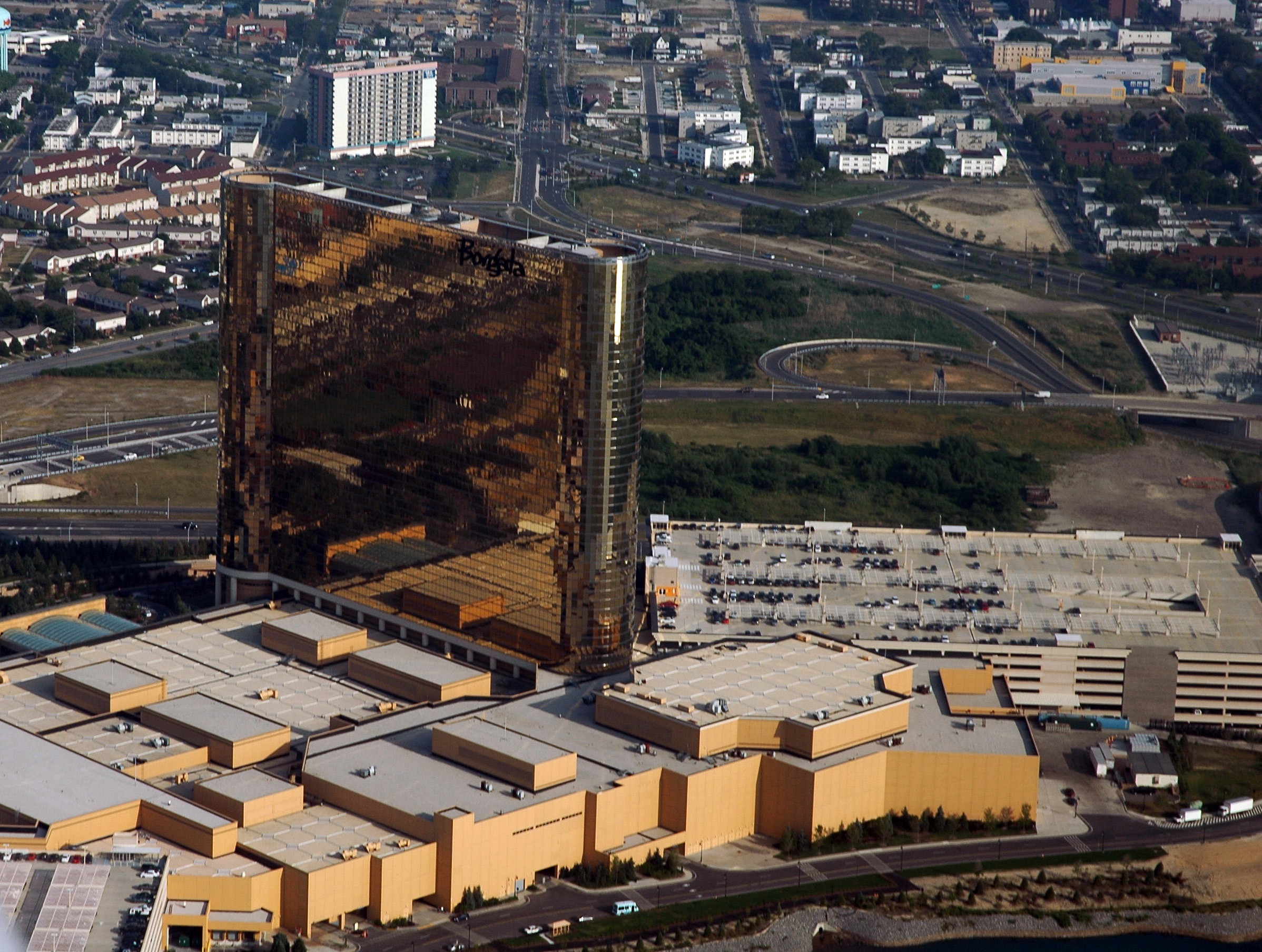
Borgata, Atlantic City's highest-grossing casino

With the redevelopment of the Las Vegas Strip and the opening of Foxwoods Resort Casino and Mohegan Sun in Connecticut in the early 1990s, along with newly built casinos in the nearby Philadelphia metro area in the 2000s, Atlantic City's tourism began to decline due to its failure to diversify away from gambling. In 1999 the Atlantic City Redevelopment Authority partnered with Las Vegas casino mogul Steve Wynn to develop a new roadway to a barren section of the city near the Marina. Nicknamed "The Tunnel Project", Steve Wynn planned the proposed 'Mirage Atlantic City' around the idea that he would connect the $330 million tunnel stretching 2.5 mi (4.0 km) from the Atlantic City Expressway to his new resort. The roadway was later officially named the Atlantic City-Brigantine Connector, and funnels incoming traffic off of the expressway into the city's marina district and the city of Brigantine.

Although Wynn's plans for development in the city were scrapped in 2002, the tunnel opened in 2001. The new roadway prompted Boyd Gaming in partnership with MGM/Mirage to build Atlantic City's newest casino. Borgata opened in July 2003, and its success brought an influx of developers to Atlantic City with plans for building grand, Las Vegas-style mega casinos to revitalize the aging city. Atlantic City has remained less popular than Las Vegas as a gambling city in the United States.

Owing to economic conditions and the late 2000s recession, many of the proposed mega casinos never advanced further than the initial planning stage. One of these developers was Pinnacle Entertainment, which purchased the Sands Atlantic City for $250–$270 million and closed it on November 11, 2006 with plans to replace it with a larger casino. The following year, the resort was demolished in an implosion, the first of its kind in Atlantic City. While Pinnacle Entertainment intended to replace it with a $1.5-$2-billion casino resort, the company canceled its construction plans and sold the land for $29.5 million. MGM Resorts International announced in October 2007 that it would pull out of all development for Atlantic City, effectively ending its plans for the MGM Grand Atlantic City.

In 2006, Morgan Stanley purchased 20 acres (8.1 ha) directly north of the Showboat Atlantic City for a new $2-billion-plus casino resort. Revel Entertainment Group was named as the project's developer for the Revel Casino. Revel was hindered with many problems, the biggest setback occurring in April 2010 when Morgan Stanley, the owner of 90% of Revel Entertainment Group, decided to discontinue funding for continued construction and put its stake in Revel up for sale. Early in 2010, the New Jersey state legislature passed a bill offering tax incentives to attract new investors and complete the job, but a poll by Fairleigh Dickinson University's PublicMind released in March 2010 showed that 60% of voters opposed the legislation, and two of three of those who opposed it "strongly" opposed it. Ultimately, Governor Chris Christie offered Revel $261 million in state tax credits to assist the casino once it opened.

Revel completed all of the exterior work and had continued work on the interior after finally receiving the funding necessary to complete construction, and had a soft opening in April 2012 before being fully open the next month. Ten months later, in February 2013, after serious losses and a write-down in the value of the resort from $2.4 billion to $450 million, Revel filed for Chapter 11 bankruptcy. It was restructured but still could not carry on and re-entered bankruptcy on June 19, 2014. It was put up for sale, however as no suitable bids were received the resort closed its doors in September 2014. The property was bought by AC Ocean Walk, LLC for $200 million in 2017, and reopened in 2018 as Ocean Casino Resort.

On October 29, 2012, "Superstorm Sandy" struck Atlantic City and caused flooding and power outages but left minimal damage to the city's tourist areas. The storm produced an all-time record low barometric pressure reading of 943 mb (27.85") for not only Atlantic City, but the state of New Jersey.

In the wake of the closures and declining revenue from casinos, Governor Christie said in September 2014 that the state would consider a 2015 referendum to end the 40-year-old monopoly that Atlantic City holds on casino gambling and allowing gambling in other municipalities. With casino revenue declining from $5.2 billion in 2006 to $2.9 billion in 2013, the state saw a drop in money from its 8% tax on those earnings, which is used to fund programs for senior citizens and the disabled.

In May 2018, the United States Supreme Court ruled in Murphy v. National Collegiate Athletic Association that the Professional and Amateur Sports Protection Act was unconstitutional. The act was overturned, allowing New Jersey to move ahead with plans to implement legalized sports betting.

Despite being the state to initiate the landmark ruling, New Jersey was actually the third state to legalize sports betting after Nevada and Delaware. In June 2018, New Jersey governor Phil Murphy signed the legislation into law, and several New Jersey–based casino brands subsequently opened sportsbooks, especially in Atlantic City.

In 2019, the Atlantic City area had the highest rates of foreclosures in the nation. This has disproportionately affected Black residents in neighborhoods segregated by redlining, a legacy that is mirrored by the values of properties on the Monopoly game board.

After several casino closures and the COVID-19 pandemic, strikes and pickets were being threatened in June 2022 by casino employees which were short-staffed and wanted pay raises.

=== Food desert ===
In 2022, the New Jersey Economic Development Authority ranked Atlantic City second on its list of the state's food desert communities (behind Camden). Atlantic City was one of a dozen municipalities statewide on the list where the entire municipality was a food desert community. As of 2024, there was only one functioning supermarket in Atlantic City, the Save-A-Lot food store located in Renaissance Plaza, an area of the city with a reputation for significant homeless population and drug use. The nearest full-service supermarket being located in neighboring Ventnor City, which is 3 miles (4.8 km) away from the majority of Atlantic City's population. In an area with unemployment 50% above the statewide average and with 87% of area residents lacking a car, getting access to a supermarket for city residents has been difficult, requiring long rides on public transportation.

To remedy this, proposals for a supermarket were floated beginning in May 2021, and Atlantic City's City Council authorized the Casino Reinvestment Development Authority to look for developers to build a supermarket. The Casino Reinvestment Development Authority proposed a new supermarket that would be located on an empty parking lot behind the Tanger Outlets and near the Atlantic City Expressway.

Groundbreaking for a ShopRite supermarket had taken place in October 2021, after Village Super Market received $18.7 million from the Casino Reinvestment Development Authority to construct the store. The supermarket was expected to be completed by December 2022, although no construction or building had happened on the site. After the time for the contract expired, the Casino Reinvestment Development Authority (CRDA) announced that the deal with Village Super Market was dead and that they were looking for new contenders. VSM created a new plan for CRDA and the city's Council to review and by July 2023, it and a Chinese conglomerate headquartered in Hong Kong emerged as the two candidates to build the supermarket.

In October 2025, after the effort to address the city's food desert status by constructing the proposed ShopRite had fizzled out, the city announced a $20 million deal to redevelop Renaissance Plaza centered around an expanded Sav-A-Lot supermarket, using funds from the Casino Reinvestment Development Authority and the New Jersey Economic Development Authority. The project, expected to be completed by the end of 2026, would increase the size of the existing store by 50% to more than 28,000 square feet (2,600 m^{2}), allowing the expansion of fresh fruit, vegetable and meat options to shoppers.

== Geography ==
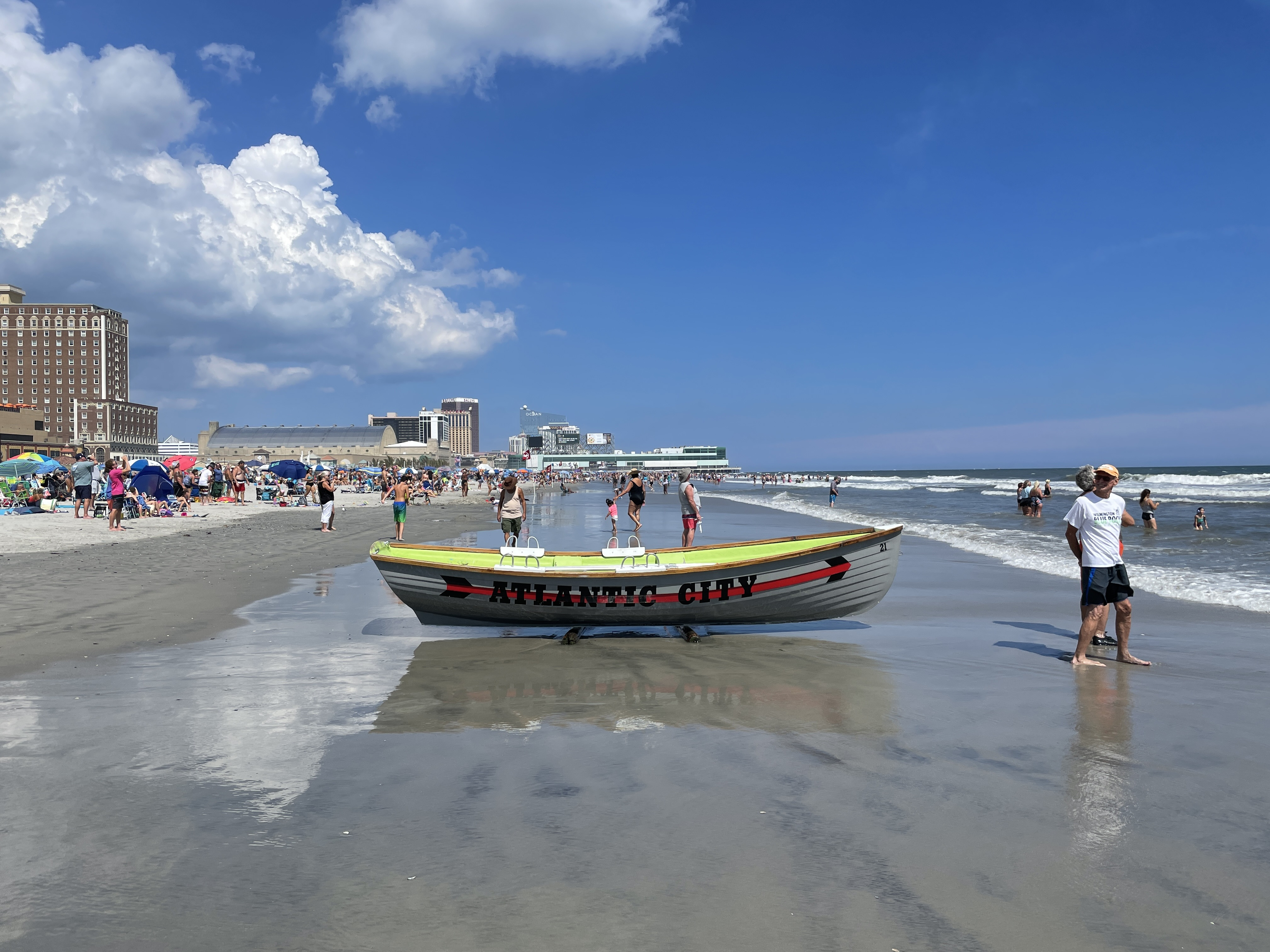
Beach in Atlantic City

According to the United States Census Bureau, Atlantic City had a total area of 17.21 square miles (44.59 km^{2}), including 10.76 square miles (27.87 km^{2}) of land and 6.45 square miles (16.72 km^{2}) of water (37.50%).

The city is located on 8.1 mi-long (13.0 km) Absecon Island, along with Ventnor City, Margate City and Longport to the southwest.

Atlantic City borders the Atlantic County municipalities of Absecon, Brigantine, Egg Harbor Township, Galloway Township, Pleasantville, and Ventnor City.

The city is located 60 mi (97 km) southeast of Philadelphia and 125 mi (201 km) south of New York City.

Unincorporated communities, localities and place names located partially or completely within the city include Chelsea, City Island, Great Island and Venice Park.

=== Climate ===
Climate chart for Atlantic City

According to the Köppen climate classification system, Atlantic City has a humid subtropical climate (Cfa) with warm, moderately humid summers, cool winters and year-around precipitation. Cfa climates are characterized by all months having an average mean temperature above 32.0 °F (0.0 °C), at least four months with an average mean temperature at or above 50.0 °F (10.0 °C), at least one month with an average mean temperature at or above 72.0 °F (22.2 °C) and no significant precipitation difference between seasons. During the summer months in Atlantic City, a cooling afternoon sea breeze is present on most days, but episodes of extreme heat and humidity can occur with heat index values at or above 95.0 °F (35.0 °C). During the winter months, episodes of extreme cold and wind can occur with wind chill values below 0.0 °F (−17.8 °C). The plant hardiness zone at Atlantic City Beach is 8a with an average annual extreme minimum air temperature of 11.0 °F (−11.7 °C). The average seasonal (November–April) snowfall total is 12 to 18 in (300 to 460 mm), and the average snowiest month is February which corresponds with the annual peak in nor'easter activity.

Climate data for Atlantic City International Airport, 1991–2020 normals, (Note: Mean monthly maxima and minima (i.e. the highest and lowest temperature readings during an entire month or year) calculated based on data at said location from 1991 to 2020.) extremes 1874–present (Note: The official climatology station for Atlantic City was at the Weather Bureau Office downtown from January 1874 to 15 June 1958 and Atlantic City Int'l (ACY) in Egg Harbor Township since 16 June 1958. ACY's location in the Pine Barrens and distance away from the coast and urban heat island of downtown Atlantic City largely account for its markedly colder temperatures at night as compared to downtown; for example, from 1959 to 2013, there were 50 days with a low of 0 °F (−18 °C) or lower, while in the same period, the corresponding number of days at downtown was 2. The National Weather Service ceased regular snowfall observations at downtown after the winter of 1958–59.)
Month	Jan	Feb	Mar	Apr	May	Jun	Jul	Aug	Sep	Oct	Nov	Dec	Year
Record high °F (°C)	78 (26)	76 (24)	87 (31)	94 (34)	99 (37)	102 (39)	105 (41)	103 (39)	99 (37)	96 (36)	84 (29)	77 (25)	106 (41)
Mean maximum °F (°C)	63.5 (17.5)	64.8 (18.2)	73.2 (22.9)	83.2 (28.4)	89.3 (31.8)	94.5 (34.7)	96.9 (36.1)	94.6 (34.8)	90.1 (32.3)	82.8 (28.2)	72.7 (22.6)	65.3 (18.5)	98.1 (36.7)
Mean daily maximum °F (°C)	43.2 (6.2)	45.8 (7.7)	52.6 (11.4)	63.3 (17.4)	72.5 (22.5)	81.5 (27.5)	86.6 (30.3)	84.8 (29.3)	78.5 (25.8)	67.7 (19.8)	57.1 (13.9)	48.1 (8.9)	65.1 (18.4)
Daily mean °F (°C)	34.1 (1.2)	36.0 (2.2)	42.6 (5.9)	52.5 (11.4)	61.9 (16.6)	71.4 (21.9)	76.9 (24.9)	75.0 (23.9)	68.4 (20.2)	57.1 (13.9)	46.8 (8.2)	38.7 (3.7)	55.1 (12.8)
Mean daily minimum °F (°C)	25.1 (−3.8)	26.2 (−3.2)	32.6 (0.3)	41.7 (5.4)	51.4 (10.8)	61.3 (16.3)	67.2 (19.6)	65.2 (18.4)	58.2 (14.6)	46.4 (8.0)	36.6 (2.6)	29.4 (−1.4)	45.1 (7.3)
Mean minimum °F (°C)	6.5 (−14.2)	9.7 (−12.4)	16.1 (−8.8)	26.7 (−2.9)	36.0 (2.2)	46.2 (7.9)	55.9 (13.3)	53.8 (12.1)	43.5 (6.4)	31.0 (−0.6)	20.4 (−6.4)	14.0 (−10.0)	4.4 (−15.3)
Record low °F (°C)	−10 (−23)	−11 (−24)	2 (−17)	12 (−11)	25 (−4)	37 (3)	42 (6)	40 (4)	32 (0)	20 (−7)	10 (−12)	−7 (−22)	−11 (−24)
Average precipitation inches (mm)	3.38 (86)	3.23 (82)	4.52 (115)	3.32 (84)	3.34 (85)	3.58 (91)	4.47 (114)	4.59 (117)	3.55 (90)	4.14 (105)	3.37 (86)	4.47 (114)	45.96 (1,167)
Average snowfall inches (cm)	5.7 (14)	5.9 (15)	2.2 (5.6)	0.3 (0.76)	0.0 (0.0)	0.0 (0.0)	0.0 (0.0)	0.0 (0.0)	0.0 (0.0)	0.0 (0.0)	0.1 (0.25)	3.2 (8.1)	17.4 (44)
Average extreme snow depth inches (cm)	3.6 (9.1)	3.1 (7.9)	1.3 (3.3)	0.1 (0.25)	0.0 (0.0)	0.0 (0.0)	0.0 (0.0)	0.0 (0.0)	0.0 (0.0)	0.0 (0.0)	0.0 (0.0)	1.9 (4.8)	6.0 (15)
Average precipitation days (≥ 0.01 in)	10.8	10.4	10.9	11.4	10.5	9.9	9.9	9.2	8.5	8.9	8.9	10.8	120.1
Average snowy days (≥ 0.1 in)	3.0	3.2	1.2	0.1	0.0	0.0	0.0	0.0	0.0	0.0	0.0	1.4	8.9
Average relative humidity (%)	69.5	69.0	66.9	66.4	70.7	72.9	73.9	75.7	76.4	74.8	72.8	70.6	71.6
Average dew point °F (°C)	21.6 (−5.8)	23.2 (−4.9)	30.0 (−1.1)	37.9 (3.3)	49.5 (9.7)	59.4 (15.2)	64.8 (18.2)	64.2 (17.9)	57.7 (14.3)	46.4 (8.0)	37.0 (2.8)	27.0 (−2.8)	43.2 (6.2)
Mean monthly sunshine hours	150.8	157.9	204.5	218.9	243.9	266.2	276.3	271.3	227.6	200.5	147.4	133.8	2,499.1
Percentage possible sunshine	50	53	55	55	55	60	61	64	61	58	49	46	56
Average ultraviolet index	1.6	2.6	4.2	6.0	7.5	8.5	8.6	7.7	6.0	3.8	2.1	1.5	5.0
Source 1: NOAA (relative humidity, dew point and sun 1961–1990)
Source 2: UV Index Today (1995 to 2022)

Climate data for Atlantic City Marina, 1991–2020 normals, extremes 1873–present
Month	Jan	Feb	Mar	Apr	May	Jun	Jul	Aug	Sep	Oct	Nov	Dec	Year
Record high °F (°C)	72 (22)	77 (25)	86 (30)	91 (33)	95 (35)	99 (37)	102 (39)	104 (40)	94 (34)	91 (33)	80 (27)	74 (23)	104 (40)
Mean maximum °F (°C)	60.0 (15.6)	60.3 (15.7)	67.8 (19.9)	77.0 (25.0)	83.8 (28.8)	90.2 (32.3)	93.0 (33.9)	90.8 (32.7)	86.2 (30.1)	79.2 (26.2)	69.3 (20.7)	62.2 (16.8)	95.0 (35.0)
Mean daily maximum °F (°C)	41.6 (5.3)	43.1 (6.2)	48.4 (9.1)	57.1 (13.9)	65.7 (18.7)	75.0 (23.9)	80.3 (26.8)	79.2 (26.2)	74.0 (23.3)	64.9 (18.3)	54.9 (12.7)	46.6 (8.1)	60.9 (16.1)
Daily mean °F (°C)	35.8 (2.1)	37.2 (2.9)	42.6 (5.9)	51.4 (10.8)	60.3 (15.7)	69.9 (21.1)	75.4 (24.1)	74.8 (23.8)	69.3 (20.7)	59.3 (15.2)	49.0 (9.4)	40.9 (4.9)	55.5 (13.1)
Mean daily minimum °F (°C)	29.9 (−1.2)	31.3 (−0.4)	36.9 (2.7)	45.6 (7.6)	54.9 (12.7)	64.8 (18.2)	70.5 (21.4)	70.3 (21.3)	64.6 (18.1)	53.6 (12.0)	43.1 (6.2)	35.1 (1.7)	50.1 (10.1)
Mean minimum °F (°C)	12.7 (−10.7)	16.2 (−8.8)	22.9 (−5.1)	34.8 (1.6)	44.9 (7.2)	54.5 (12.5)	63.4 (17.4)	62.4 (16.9)	52.4 (11.3)	40.0 (4.4)	29.4 (−1.4)	21.4 (−5.9)	11.0 (−11.7)
Record low °F (°C)	−4 (−20)	−9 (−23)	8 (−13)	15 (−9)	33 (1)	45 (7)	52 (11)	48 (9)	37 (3)	27 (−3)	10 (−12)	−7 (−22)	−9 (−23)
Average precipitation inches (mm)	3.09 (78)	3.27 (83)	4.27 (108)	3.36 (85)	3.10 (79)	3.23 (82)	3.75 (95)	4.13 (105)	3.56 (90)	4.25 (108)	3.44 (87)	4.17 (106)	43.62 (1,108)
Average precipitation days (≥ 0.01 in)	9.9	9.5	10.9	10.6	10.6	9.3	9.0	7.9	8.1	8.6	8.8	10.9	114.1
Source: NOAA

Climate data for Atlantic City, NJ Ocean Water Temperature, 1911–present normals
Month	Jan	Feb	Mar	Apr	May	Jun	Jul	Aug	Sep	Oct	Nov	Dec	Year
Daily mean °F (°C)	39.7 (4.3)	38.5 (3.6)	41.9 (5.5)	48.7 (9.3)	56.4 (13.6)	64.7 (18.2)	68.9 (20.5)	73.1 (22.8)	72.2 (22.3)	64.1 (17.8)	53.6 (12.0)	45.2 (7.3)	55.7 (13.2)
Source: NCEI

=== Ecology ===
According to the A. W. Kuchler U.S. potential natural vegetation types, Atlantic City would have a dominant vegetation type of Northern Cordgrass (73) with a dominant vegetation form of Coastal Prairie (20).

== Demographics ==
Historical population
Census	Pop.	Note	%±
1860	687		—
1870	1,043		51.8%
1880	5,477		425.1%
1890	13,055		138.4%
1900	27,838		113.2%
1910	46,150		65.8%
1920	50,707		9.9%
1930	66,198		30.6%
1940	64,094		−3.2%
1950	61,657		−3.8%
1960	59,544		−3.4%
1970	47,859		−19.6%
1980	40,199		−16.0%
1990	37,986		−5.5%
2000	40,517		6.7%
2010	39,558		−2.4%
2020	38,497		−2.7%
2023 (est.)	38,464		−0.1%
Population sources: 1860–2000 1860–1920; 1870 1880–1890; 1890–1910 1860–1930; 1940–2000 2000; 2010 2020

=== 2020 census ===
As of the 2020 census, Atlantic City had a population of 38,497. The median age was 37.9 years. 23.5% of residents were under the age of 18 and 15.8% of residents were 65 years of age or older. For every 100 females there were 94.4 males, and for every 100 females age 18 and over there were 91.4 males age 18 and over.

99.9% of residents lived in urban areas, while 0.1% lived in rural areas.

There were 15,859 households in Atlantic City, of which 28.9% had children under the age of 18 living in them. Of all households, 24.2% were married-couple households, 28.5% were households with a male householder and no spouse or partner present, and 40.3% were households with a female householder and no spouse or partner present. About 40.2% of all households were made up of individuals and 16.5% had someone living alone who was 65 years of age or older.

There were 20,419 housing units, of which 22.3% were vacant. The homeowner vacancy rate was 4.3% and the rental vacancy rate was 9.2%.

Racial composition as of the 2020 census
Race	Number	Percent
White	7,409	19.2%
Black or African American	13,717	35.6%
American Indian and Alaska Native	257	0.7%
Asian	6,244	16.2%
Native Hawaiian and Other Pacific Islander	226	0.6%
Some other race	6,567	17.1%
Two or more races	4,077	10.6%
Hispanic or Latino (of any race)	11,513	29.9%

=== 2010 census ===
The 2010 United States census counted 39,558 people, 15,504 households, and 8,558 families in the city. The population density was 3,680.8 per square mile (1,421.2/km^{2}). There were 20,013 housing units at an average density of 1,862.2 per square mile (719.0/km^{2}). The racial makeup was 26.65% (10,543) White, 38.29% (15,148) Black or African American, 0.61% (242) Native American, 15.55% (6,153) Asian, 0.05% (18) Pacific Islander, 14.03% (5,549) from other races, and 4.82% (1,905) from two or more races. Hispanic or Latino of any race were 30.45% (12,044) of the population.

Of the 15,504 households, 27.3% had children under the age of 18; 25.9% were married couples living together; 22.2% had a female householder with no husband present and 44.8% were non-families. Of all households, 37.5% were made up of individuals and 14.3% had someone living alone who was 65 years of age or older. The average household size was 2.50 and the average family size was 3.34.

People under the age of 18 account for 24.6%, 10.2% from 18 to 24, 26.8% from 25 to 44, 25.8% from 45 to 64, and 12.7% who were 65 years of age or older. The median age was 36.3 years. For every 100 females, the population had 96.2 males. For every 100 females ages 18 and older there were 94.4 males.

The Census Bureau's 2006–2010 American Community Survey showed that (in 2010 inflation-adjusted dollars) median household income was $30,237 (with a margin of error of +/− $2,354) and the median family income was $35,488 (+/− $2,607). Males had a median income of $32,207 (+/− $1,641) versus $29,298 (+/− $1,380) for females. The per capita income for the city was $20,069 (+/− $2,532). About 23.1% of families and 25.3% of the population were below the poverty line, including 36.6% of those under age 18 and 16.8% of those age 65 or over.

=== 2000 census ===
As of the 2000 United States census, there were 40,517 people, 15,848 households, and 8,700 families residing in the city. The population density was 3,569.8 inhabitants per square mile (1,378.3/km^{2}). There were 20,219 housing units at an average density of 1,781.4 per square mile (687.8/km^{2}). The racial makeup of the city was 44.16% black or African American, 26.68% White, 0.48% Native American, 10.40% Asian, 0.06% Pacific Islander, 13.76% other races, and 4.47% from two or more races. 24.95% of the population were Hispanic or Latino of any race. 19.44% of the population was non-Hispanic whites.

There were 15,848 households, out of which 27.7% had children under the age of 18 living with them, 24.8% were married couples living together, 23.2% had a female householder with no husband present, and 45.1% were non-families. 37.2% of all households were made up of individuals, and 15.4% had someone living alone who was 65 years of age or older. The average household size was 2.46 and the average family size was 3.26.

In the city the age distribution of the population shows 25.7% under the age of 18, 8.9% from 18 to 24, 31.0% from 25 to 44, 20.2% from 45 to 64, and 14.2% who were 65 years of age or older. The median age was 35 years. For every 100 females, there were 96.1 males. For every 100 females age 18 and over, there were 93.2 males.

The median income for a household in the city was $26,969, and the median income for a family was $31,997. Males had a median income of $25,471 versus $23,863 for females. The per capita income for the city was $15,402. About 19.1% of families and 23.6% of the population were below the poverty line, including 29.1% of those under age 18 and 18.9% of those age 65 or over.

== Economy ==
In September 2014, the greater Atlantic City area had one of the highest unemployment rates in the country at 13.8%, out of a labor force of around 141,000.

=== Tourism district ===
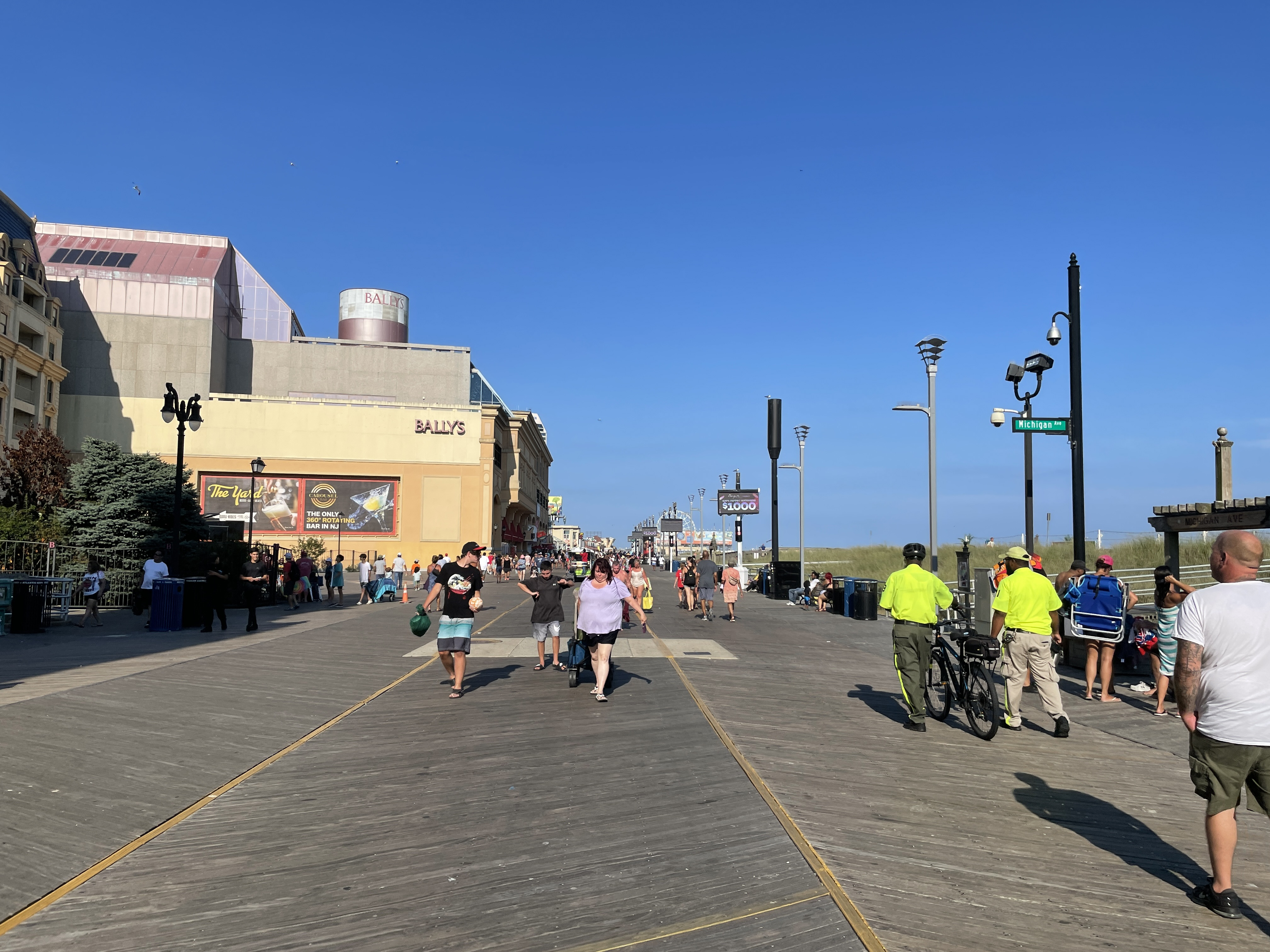
Atlantic City boardwalk at Michigan Avenue

In July 2010, Governor Chris Christie announced that a state takeover of the city and local government "was imminent". Comparing regulations in Atlantic City to an "antique car", Atlantic City regulatory reform was a key piece of Governor Chris Christie's plan to reinvigorate an industry mired in a four-year slump in revenue and hammered by fresh competition from casinos in the surrounding states of Delaware, Pennsylvania, Connecticut, and more recently, Maryland. In January 2011, Chris Christie announced the creation of the Atlantic City Tourism District, a state-run district encompassing the boardwalk casinos, the marina casinos, the Atlantic City Outlets, and Bader Field. Fairleigh Dickinson University's PublicMind poll surveyed New Jersey voters' attitudes on the takeover. A February 2011 survey showed that 43% opposed the measure while 29% favored direct state oversight. The poll also found that even South Jersey voters expressed opposition to the plan; 40% reported they opposed the measure and 37% reported they were in favor of it.

On April 29, 2011, the boundaries for the state-run tourism district were set. The district would include heavier police presence, as well as beautification projects and infrastructure improvements. The CRDA would oversee all functions of the district and make changes to attract new businesses and attractions. New construction has already resulted in cases of eminent domain being used to seize properties for development.

The tourism district would comprise several key areas in the city: the Marina District, Ducktown, Chelsea, South Inlet, Bader Field, and Gardner's Basin. Also included are 10 roadways that lead into the district, including several in the city's northern end, or North Beach. Gardner's Basin, which is home to the Atlantic City Aquarium, was initially left out of the tourism district, while a residential neighborhood in the Chelsea section was removed from the final boundaries, owing to complaints from the city. Also, the inclusion of Bader Field in the district was controversial and received much scrutiny from mayor Lorenzo Langford, who cast the lone "no" vote on the creation of the district citing its inclusion.

=== Casinos and gambling ===
The history of gambling in Atlantic City traces back to Prohibition and the 1920s, with racketeer Louis Kuehnle running an underground hotel and casino. Enoch "Nucky" Johnson followed and furthered Atlantic City's rise through the Roaring Twenties as a destination for drinking, gambling, and nightlife. In 1974, New Jersey voters voted 60%–40% against legalizing casino gambling at four sites statewide, but two years later approved by 56%–44% a new referendum which legalized casinos, but restricted them to Atlantic City. Resorts Atlantic City was the first casino to open, in May 1978, with a ribbon-cutting ceremony featuring Governor of New Jersey Brendan Byrne. Atlantic City is considered the "Gambling Capital of the East Coast", and currently has nine large casinos. In 2011, New Jersey's then 12 casinos employed approximately 33,000 employees, had 28.5 million visitors, made $3.3 billion in gaming revenue, and paid $278 million in taxes. They are regulated by the New Jersey Casino Control Commission and the New Jersey Division of Gaming Enforcement.

In the wake of the economic downturn following the Great Recession and the legalization of gambling in adjacent and nearby states (including Delaware, Maryland, New York, and Pennsylvania), four casino closures took place in 2014: the Atlantic Club on January 13; the Showboat on August 31; the Revel, which was Atlantic City's second-newest casino, on September 2; and Trump Plaza, which originally opened in 1984, and was the poorest performing casino in the city, on September 16.

Executives at Trump Entertainment Resorts, whose sole remaining property at the time was the Trump Taj Mahal, said in 2013 that they were considering the option of selling the Taj and winding down and exiting the gaming and hotel business. Trump Taj Mahal closed October 10, 2016, after failing to come to terms with union workers.

Caesars Entertainment executives have been reconsidering the future of their three remaining Atlantic City properties (Bally's, Caesars and Harrah's), in the wake of a Chapter 11 bankruptcy filing by the company's casino operating unit in January 2015. In 2020, Bally's Atlantic City was acquired by Bally's Corporation. Gross gaming revenue of the city's nine operating casinos in 2022 totaled $2.79 billion, a 9% increase from the $2.55 billion earned the previous year.

==== Current casinos ====
Casino	Opening date	Casino Operator	Theme	Hotel rooms	Section of city	Total Gaming Space
Resorts	May 26, 1978	DGMB Casinos	Roaring Twenties	942	Uptown	100,000 sq ft
Caesars^{a}	June 26, 1979	Caesars Entertainment	Roman Empire	1,141	Midtown	145,000 sq ft
Bally's^{a}	December 29, 1979	Bally's Corporation	Modern	1,214	Midtown	225,756 sq ft
Harrah's	November 27, 1980	Caesars Entertainment	Marina Waterfront	2,587	Marina	160,000 sq ft
Tropicana	November 26, 1981	Caesars Entertainment	Old Havana	2,364	Downbeach	125,935 sq ft
Golden Nugget	June 19, 1985	Landry's	Gold Rush Era	717	Marina	74,252 sq ft
Borgata	July 2, 2003	MGM Resorts	Tuscany	2,767	Marina	161,000 sq ft
Hard Rock	June 27, 2018	Hard Rock International	Rock and roll	2,032	Uptown	167,000 sq ft
Ocean	June 27, 2018	AC Beachfront, L.L.C.	Ocean	1,900	Uptown	130,000 sq ft
Total				15,602		1,144,943 sq ft

^{a} The Wild Wild West Casino, which opened on July 2, 1997, and has an American Old West theme, was part of Bally's Atlantic City until 2020, when it became part of Caesars.

==== Renamed casinos ====
Casino	New Name
ACH Casino Resort	Atlantic Club Casino Hotel
Atlantic City Hilton (Original)	Trump's Castle
Atlantic City Hilton	ACH Casino Resort
Bally's Grand	The Grand
Bally's Park Place	Bally's Atlantic City
Brighton Casino	Sands Atlantic City
Del Webb's Claridge	Claridge
Golden Nugget (Original)	Bally's Grand
Park Place	Bally's Park Place
Harrah's at Trump Plaza	Trump Plaza
Playboy Hotel & Casino	Permanent casino license denied; renamed Atlantis Casino
The Grand	The Atlantic City Hilton
Trump's Castle	Trump Marina
Trump Marina	Golden Nugget
Revel Atlantic City	Ocean Casino Resort
Trump Taj Mahal	Hard Rock Hotel & Casino Atlantic City

==== Closed casinos ====
Casino	Opening Date	Closing Date	Status of Property
Trump Taj Mahal	April 2, 1990	October 10, 2016	The casino shut down having failed to reach a deal with its union workers to restore health care and pension benefits that were taken away from them in bankruptcy court. Nearly 3,000 workers lost their jobs. Reopened in 2018 as the Hard Rock Hotel and Casino Atlantic City.
Trump Plaza	May 14, 1984	September 16, 2014	On February 15, 2013, Trump Entertainment Resorts announced that it intended to sell Trump Plaza to the Meruelo Group for $20 million, the lowest price ever paid for an Atlantic City casino. Carl Icahn, senior lender for Trump Plaza's mortgage, declined to approve the sale for the proposed price. The casino was later demolished on February 17, 2021.
Revel	April 2, 2012	September 2, 2014	Brookfield Asset Management's winning bid of $110 million on September 30, 2014, for Atlantic City's Revel Casino Hotel, and the company's intention to operate it as a casino, generated some excitement, but the company backed out of this deal on November 19, 2014. In January 2018, it was announced that the property had been sold for $200 million. It reopened as the Ocean Resort Casino in June 2018.
Showboat	April 2, 1987	August 31, 2014	On December 13, 2014, Stockton University purchased the property for $18 million with the intent of turning it into an Atlantic City campus. However, a preexisting covenant required the property to operate as a casino. Stockton entered an agreement providing Glenn Straub with an option to purchase the property, which was not exercised. Stockton subsequently sold the property to developer Bart Blatstein in January 2016 for $23 million. The building was reopened in July 2016 as a non-casino hotel.
Atlantic Club	December 12, 1980	January 13, 2014	Building and contents sold to Caesars Entertainment Corporation. Slots and tables sold to Tropicana Casino & Resort Atlantic City.
Trump Marina	June 19, 1985	May 23, 2011	Building sold to Landry's, Inc. in February 2011, sale approved in May and Landry's took control on May 23 of that year and renamed it the Golden Nugget Atlantic City.
Sands	August 31, 1980	November 11, 2006	Building demolished in 2007. The site is now an empty lot after a proposal estimated at up to $2 billion by Pinnacle Entertainment for a casino on the site did not move forward.
Claridge	July 20, 1981	December 30, 2002	Now operating as an independent non-casino hotel.
Trump World's Fair	May 15, 1996	October 3, 1999	Building was demolished and replaced by new strip stores.
Atlantis Casino	April 14, 1981	July 4, 1989	Originally opened by Playboy Enterprises, which was found unsuitable for licensure, Playboy casino closed and then reopened by Elsinor Corporation as the Atlantis. In 1989 the Casino Control Commission revoked Atlantis' license and property sold to become Trump World's Fair an extension of the Trump Plaza.

==== Cancelled casinos ====
Casino	Status of Property
Camelot	Cancelled; currently an empty lot
Dunes Atlantic City	Never completed; current site of student housing on the Stockton University Atlantic City campus
Hilton (Original)	Casino license denied; current site of Golden Nugget Atlantic City
Le Jardin	Cancelled; currently Borgata
Margaritaville Marina Casino	Cancelled; current site of Golden Nugget Atlantic City
Mirage Atlantic City	Cancelled; currently Borgata
MGM Grand Atlantic City	Cancelled; currently an empty lot
Penthouse Casino	Never built; currently an empty lot
Resorts Taj Mahal	Cancelled; current site of Hard Rock Hotel and Casino Atlantic City
Sahara Atlantic City	Cancelled; currently a parking lot

=== Boardwalk ===
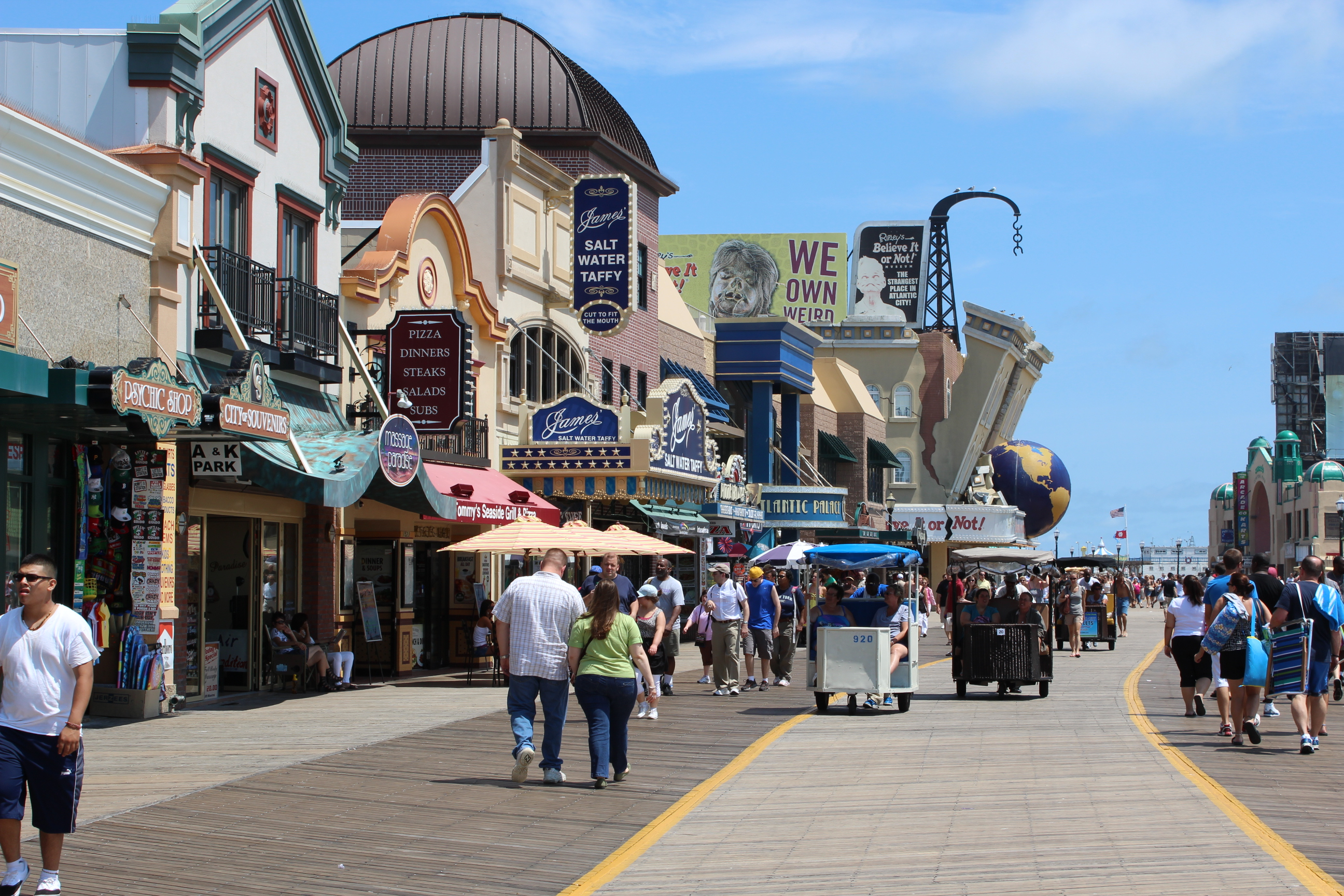
Boardwalk in Atlantic City

The Atlantic City Boardwalk opened on June 26, 1870, a temporary structure erected for the summer season that was the first boardwalk in the world. At 5 1/2 miles (8.9 km) long, the Atlantic City Boardwalk is also the world's longest and busiest boardwalk.

The Boardwalk starts at Absecon Inlet in the north and runs along the beach south-west to the city limit 4 mi (6.4 km) away then continues 1 1/2 mi (2.4 km) into Ventnor City. Casino/hotels front the boardwalk, as well as retail stores, restaurants, and amusements. Notable attractions include the Boardwalk Hall, House of Blues, and the Ripley's Believe It or Not! museum.

In October 2012, Hurricane Sandy destroyed the northern part of the boardwalk fronting Absecon Inlet, in the residential section called South Inlet. The oceanfront boardwalk in front of the Atlantic City casinos survived the storm with minimal damage.

The first pier along the boardwalk, Applegate's Pier, opened in 1884. It was acquired by John L. Young in 1891, who expanded and operated it as Young's Ocean Pier, but it was mostly destroyed in a 1912 fire. The remaining part of the pier was rebuilt in 1922 as the Central Pier, which is still in operation.

A Heinz-owned pier named Heinz Pier was destroyed in the 1944 Great Atlantic hurricane.

The most famous Atlantic City pier was Steel Pier, which opened in 1898, and which once billed itself as "The Showplace of the Nation". It closed in 1978, and was mostly destroyed in a 1982 fire. It was rebuilt in the late 1980s and is now operated as an amusement pier across from the Hard Rock.

Steeplechase Pier opened in 1899 and operated until 1986. It suffered significant damage in a 1988 fire, and the remnants of the pier were removed in 1996. The "Steeplechase Pier Heliport" on Steel Pier is named in its honor.

Captain John L. Young opened "Young's Million Dollar Pier" in 1906, and on the seaward side "erected a marble mansion", fronted by a formal garden, with lighting and landscaping designed by Young's longtime friend Thomas Alva Edison. Million Dollar Pier once rivaled Steel Pier as Atlantic City's leading pier, but after suffering decades of decline, was rebuilt into a shopping mall in the 1980s, known as "Shops on Ocean One". In 2006, the Ocean One mall was bought, renovated and re-branded as "The Pier Shops at Caesars" and in 2015, it was renamed "Playground Pier". In September 2023, it was renamed "ACX1 Studios" for the film and entertainment production studios that took over the building, with a planned grand reopening containing a mixture of retail, restaurants, creative space, and production studios in summer of 2024.

Garden Pier, located opposite Ocean Casino Resort, once housed a movie theater, and is now home to the Atlantic City Historical Museum.

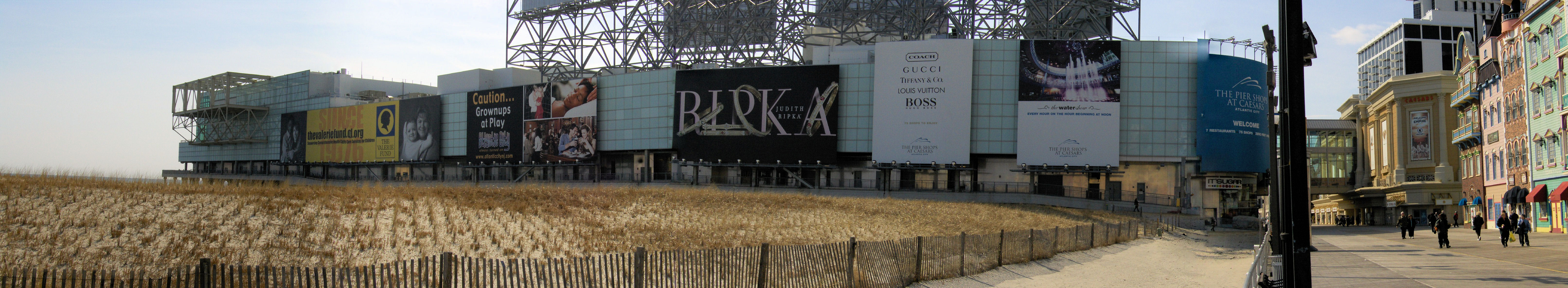
Panoramic view of Playground Pier

=== Shopping ===
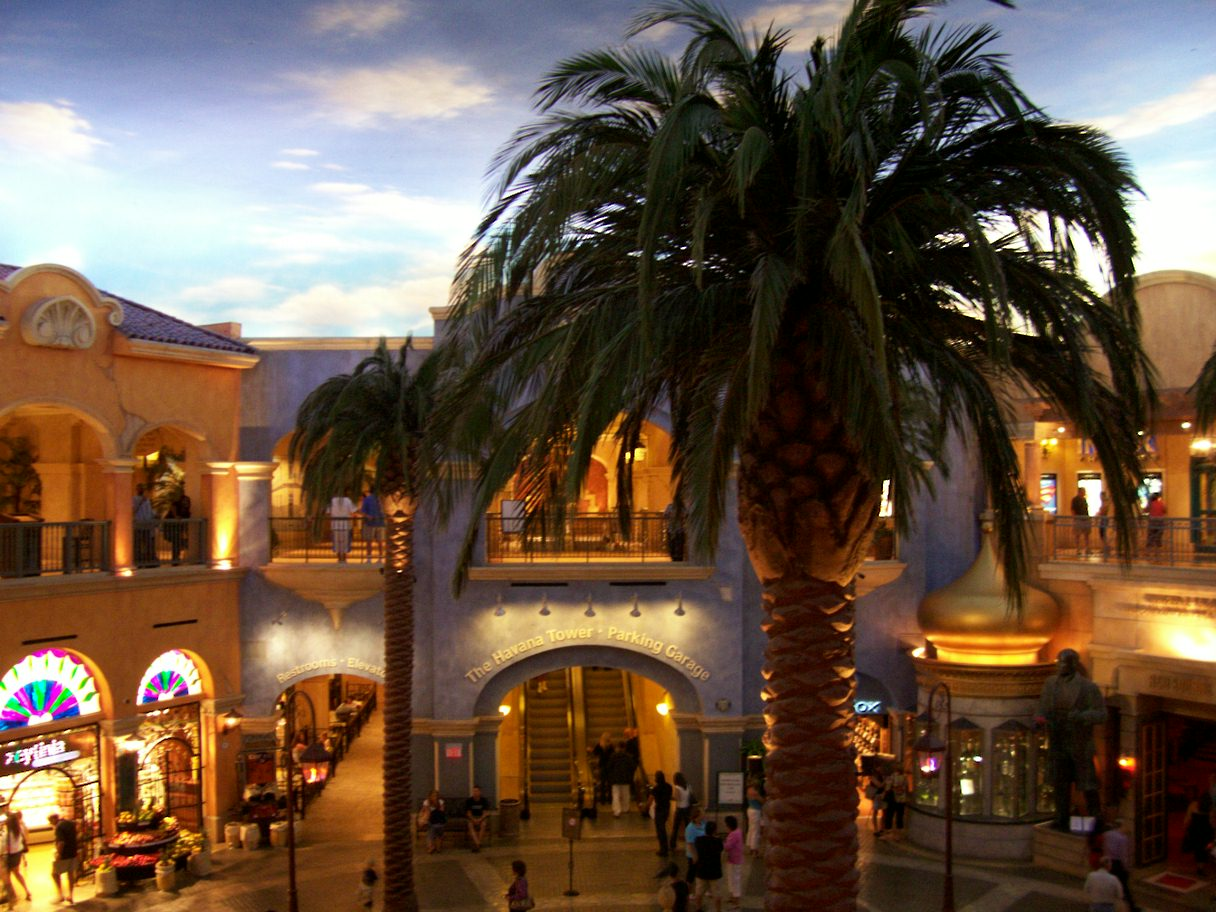
The Quarter at Tropicana

Atlantic City has many different shopping districts and malls, many of which are located inside or adjacent to the casino resorts. Several smaller themed retail and dining areas in casino hotels include the Borgata Shops and The Shoppes at Water Club inside Borgata, the Waterfront Shops inside of Harrah's, Spice Road inside the Trump Taj Mahal, while Resorts Casino Hotel has a small collection of stores and restaurants. Major shopping malls are also located in and around Atlantic City.

Atlantic City shops include:

- Playground Pier, an underwater-themed indoor high end shopping center located on the Million Dollar Pier formerly known as "Shops on Ocean One". The four-story shopping mall contains themed floors.
- Tanger Outlets The Walk, an outdoor outlet shopping center spanning several blocks. The only outlet mall in Atlantic County, The Walk opened in 2003 and is undergoing an expansion.
- The Quarter at Tropicana, an old Havana-themed indoor shopping center at the Tropicana, which contains over 40 stores, restaurants, and nightclubs.

=== Exhibition ===
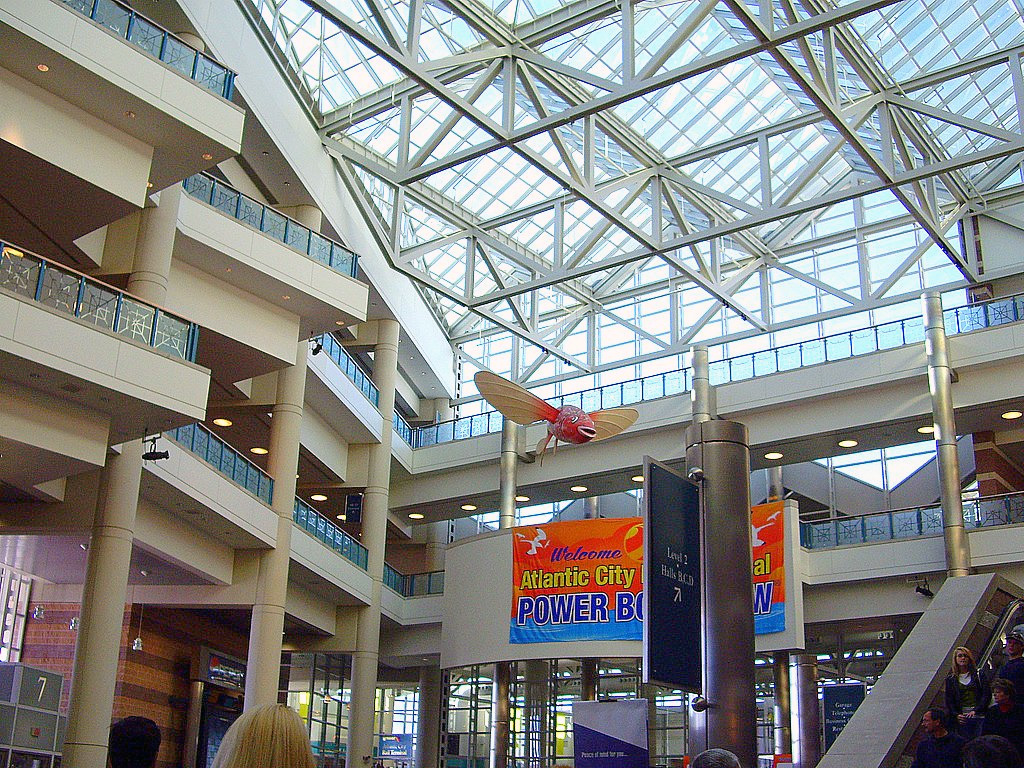
Atlantic City Convention Center

Boardwalk Hall, formally known as the "Historic Atlantic City Convention Hall", is an arena in Atlantic City along the boardwalk. Boardwalk Hall was Atlantic City's primary convention center until the opening of the Atlantic City Convention Center in 1997. The Atlantic City Convention Center includes 500,000 sq ft (46,000 m^{2}) of showroom space, 5 exhibit halls, 45 meeting rooms with 109,000 sq ft (10,100 m^{2}) of space, a garage with 1,400 parking spaces, and an adjacent Sheraton hotel. Both the Boardwalk Hall and Convention Center are operated by the Atlantic City Convention & Visitors Authority.

== Arts and culture ==
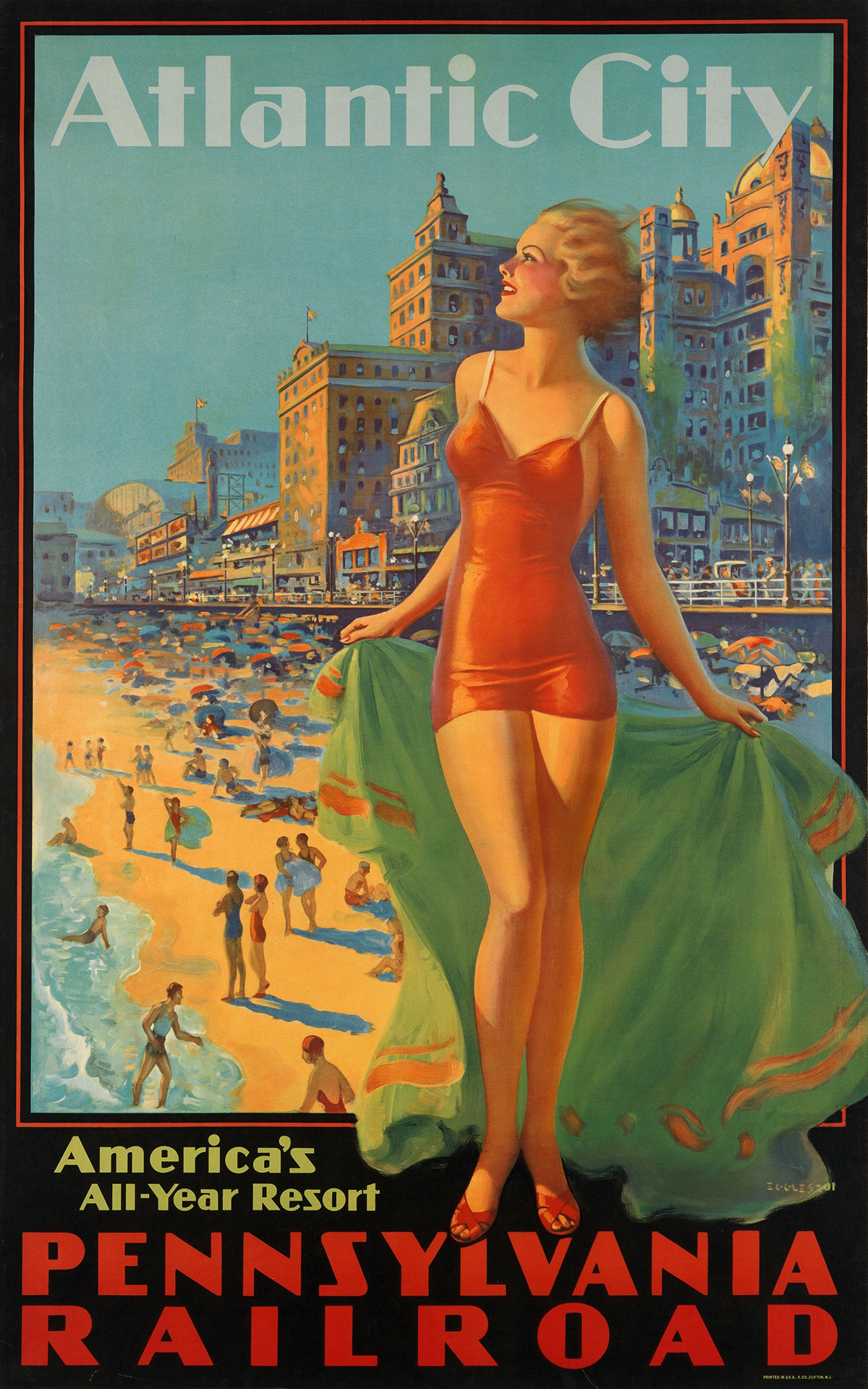
1930s Atlantic City by Edward Mason Eggleston

=== Monopoly ===
Atlantic City (sometimes referred to as "Monopoly City") has become well-known over the years for its portrayal in the U.S. version of the popular board game Monopoly, in which properties on the board are named after locations in and near Atlantic City. While the original incarnation of the game did not feature Atlantic City, it was in Indianapolis that Ruth Hoskins learned the game, and took it back to Atlantic City. After she arrived, Hoskins made a new board with Atlantic City street names, and taught it to a group of friends, who ultimately passed in on to Charles Darrow, who made some modifications to the game and claimed it as his own invention. The relative prices of the places on the board reflect to some extent the social status of neighborhoods at the time, with wealthy white streets being worth more, and streets where Black and Asian residents lived being cheaper.

Marvin Gardens, the leading yellow property on the board, is actually a misspelling of the original location name, "Marven Gardens". The misspelling was said to have been introduced by Charles Todd and passed on when his home-made Monopoly board was copied by Charles Darrow and thence Parker Brothers. It was not until 1995 that Parker Brothers acknowledged this mistake and formally apologized to the residents of Marven Gardens for the misspelling, although the spelling error was not corrected.

Some of the actual locations that correspond to board elements have changed since the game's release. Illinois Avenue was renamed Martin Luther King Jr. Boulevard in the 1980s. St. Charles Place no longer exists, as the Showboat Casino Hotel was developed where it once ran.

The "Short Line" is believed to refer to the Shore Fast Line, a streetcar line that served Atlantic City, or a bus route. The B&O Railroad did not serve Atlantic City. A booklet included with the reprinted 1935 edition states that the four railroads that served Atlantic City in the mid-1930s were the Jersey Central, the Seashore Lines, the Reading Railroad, and the Pennsylvania Railroad.

The actual "Electric Company" and "Water Works" serving the city are the Atlantic City Electric Company and the Atlantic City Municipal Utilities Authority, respectively.

=== Attractions ===
Ever since Atlantic City's growth as a resort town, numerous attractions and tourist traps have originated in the city. A popular fixture in the early 20th century at the Steel Pier was horse diving, which was introduced by William "Doc" Carver. The Steel Pier featured several other novelty attractions, including the Diving Bell, human high-divers and a water circus. Advertisements for the Steel Pier in its heyday featured plaster sculptures set upon wooden bases along roads leading up to Atlantic City. By the end of World War II, many animal demonstrations declined in popularity after criticisms of animal abuse and neglect.

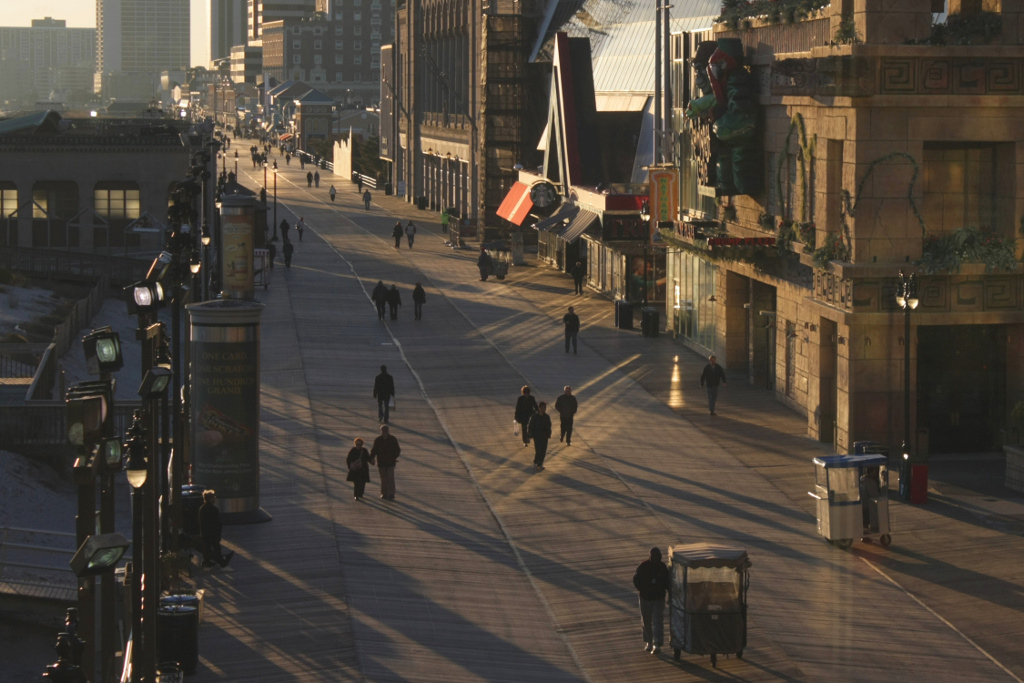
Rolling chair on the boardwalk in winter 2012

Rolling chairs were introduced in 1876 for handicapped visitors and have been in continuous use since 1887 when they were made available to the general public, and have been a boardwalk fixture ever since. While powered carts appeared in the 1960s, the original and most common were made of wicker. The wicker canopied chairs-on-wheels are manually pushed the length of the boardwalk by attendants, much like a rickshaw. Tramcars carrying 25 passengers each were introduced in June 1973, by which time the number of rolling carts had dropped from the thousands to as few as 10. A tram service was introduced in 2015, initially using the warning announcements that had been used on Wildwood's tramcars until it was changed after complaints from Wildwood.

The Absecon Lighthouse is a coastal lighthouse located in the South Inlet section of Atlantic City overlooking Absecon Inlet. It is the tallest lighthouse in the state of New Jersey and is the third tallest masonry lighthouse in the United States. Construction began in 1854, with the light first lit on January 15, 1857. The lighthouse was deactivated in 1933 and although the light still shines every night, it is no longer an active navigational aid. Gardner's Basin, which is home to the Atlantic City Aquarium as well as small shops and restaurants, is located a short distance north of Absecon Light.

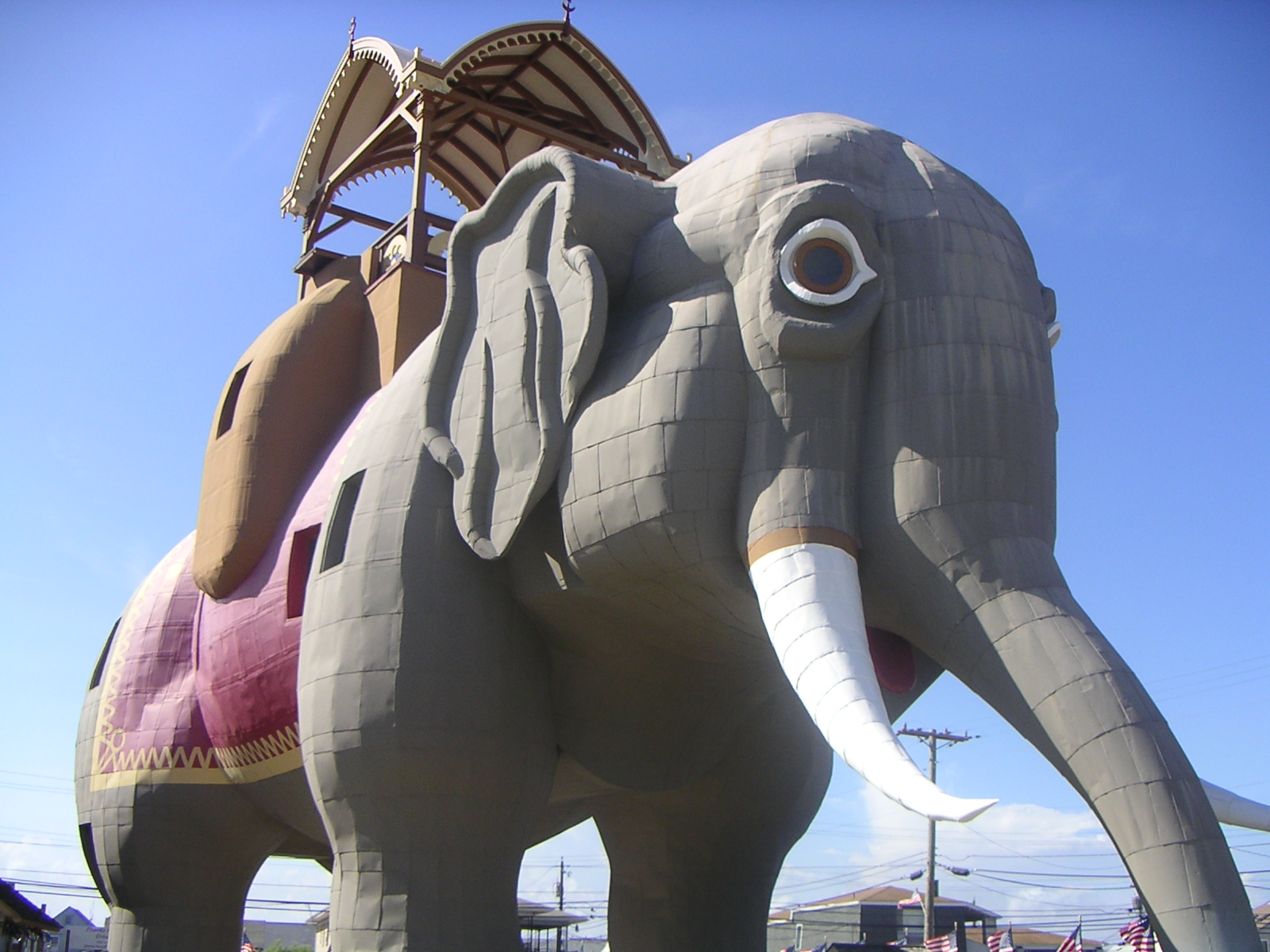
Lucy the Elephant in nearby Margate City

While located 2 mi (3.2 km) south of Atlantic City in Margate City, Lucy the Elephant has become almost an icon for the Atlantic City area. Lucy is a six-story elephant-shaped example of novelty architecture, constructed of wood and tin sheeting in 1882 by James V. Lafferty in an effort to sell real estate and attract tourism. Over the years, Lucy had served as a restaurant, business office, cottage, and tavern (the last closed by Prohibition). Lucy had fallen into disrepair by the 1960s and was scheduled for demolition. The structure was moved and refurbished as a result of a "Save Lucy" campaign in 1970 and received designation as a National Historic Landmark in 1976, and is open as a museum.

=== Miss America pageant ===
Atlantic City was the home of the Miss America competition, hosting the event from its inception until 2004, and again from 2013 to 2018. The Miss America competition originated on September 7, 1921, as a two-day beauty contest, and it included state contestants as well as women from various cities around the country. The event that year was called the "Atlantic City Pageant", and the winner of the grand prize, Margaret Gorman, took home the 3-foot Golden Mermaid trophy. Gorman was not called "Miss America" until 1922, when she re-entered the pageant and lost to Mary Campbell. The pageant was initiated to extend the tourist season after the Labor Day weekend. The pageant has been nationally televised since 1954. It peaked in the early 1960s, when it was repeatedly the highest-rated program on American television. It was seen as a symbol of the United States, with Miss America often being referred to as the female equivalent of the President. The pageant's longtime emcee, Bert Parks, hosted the event from 1955 to 1979. At the Atlantic City Convention Center, there is a 400 lb (180 kg) interactive statue of Parks holding a crown. When a visitor puts their head inside the crown, sensors activate a recorded playback of his "There She Is..." line through speakers hidden behind nearby bushes.

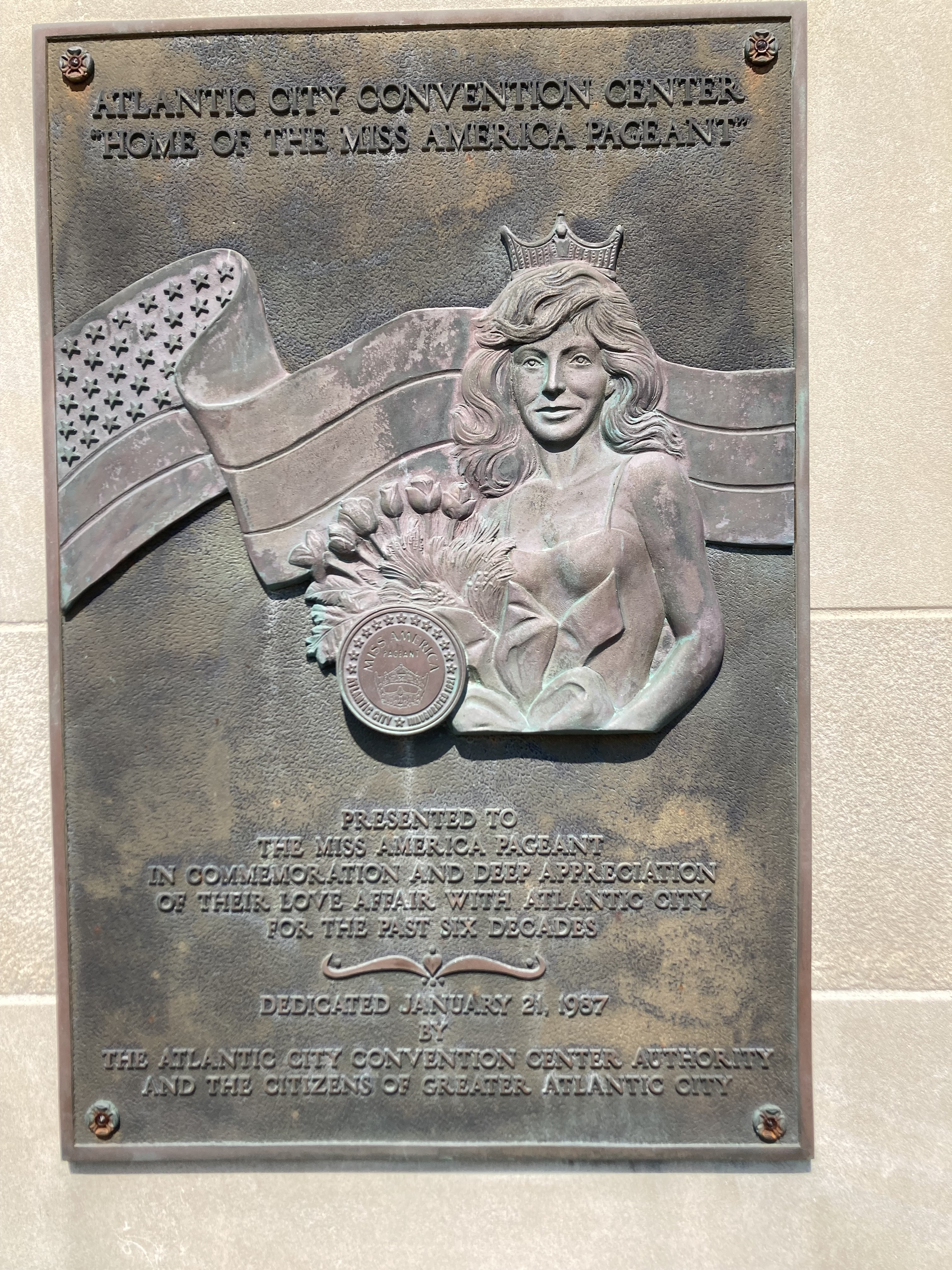
Plaque for the Site of Previous Miss American Pageants

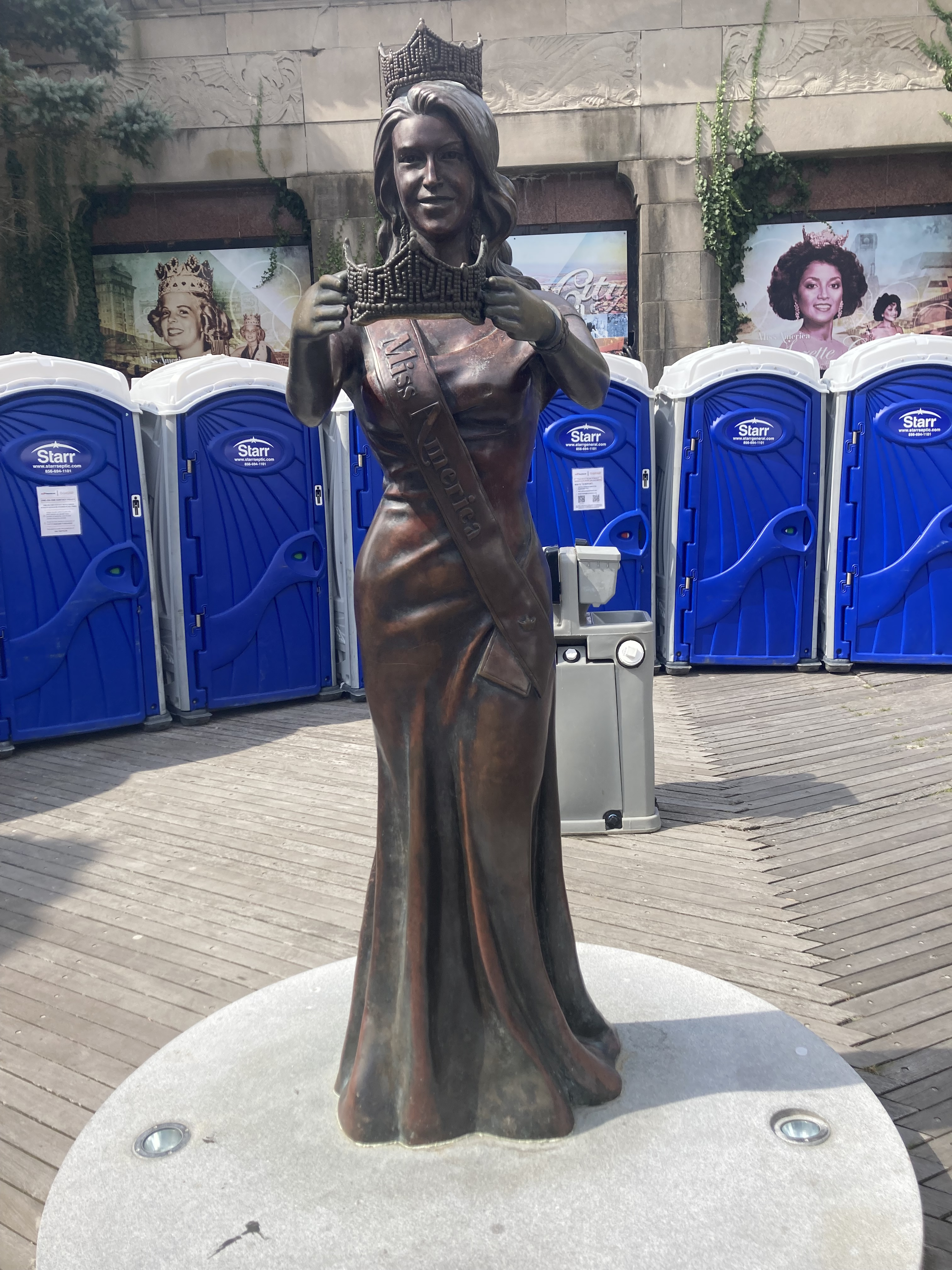
Statue for Miss America, Atlantic City (the Port-A-Potties were for a Triathlon)

=== Boardwalk Empire ===
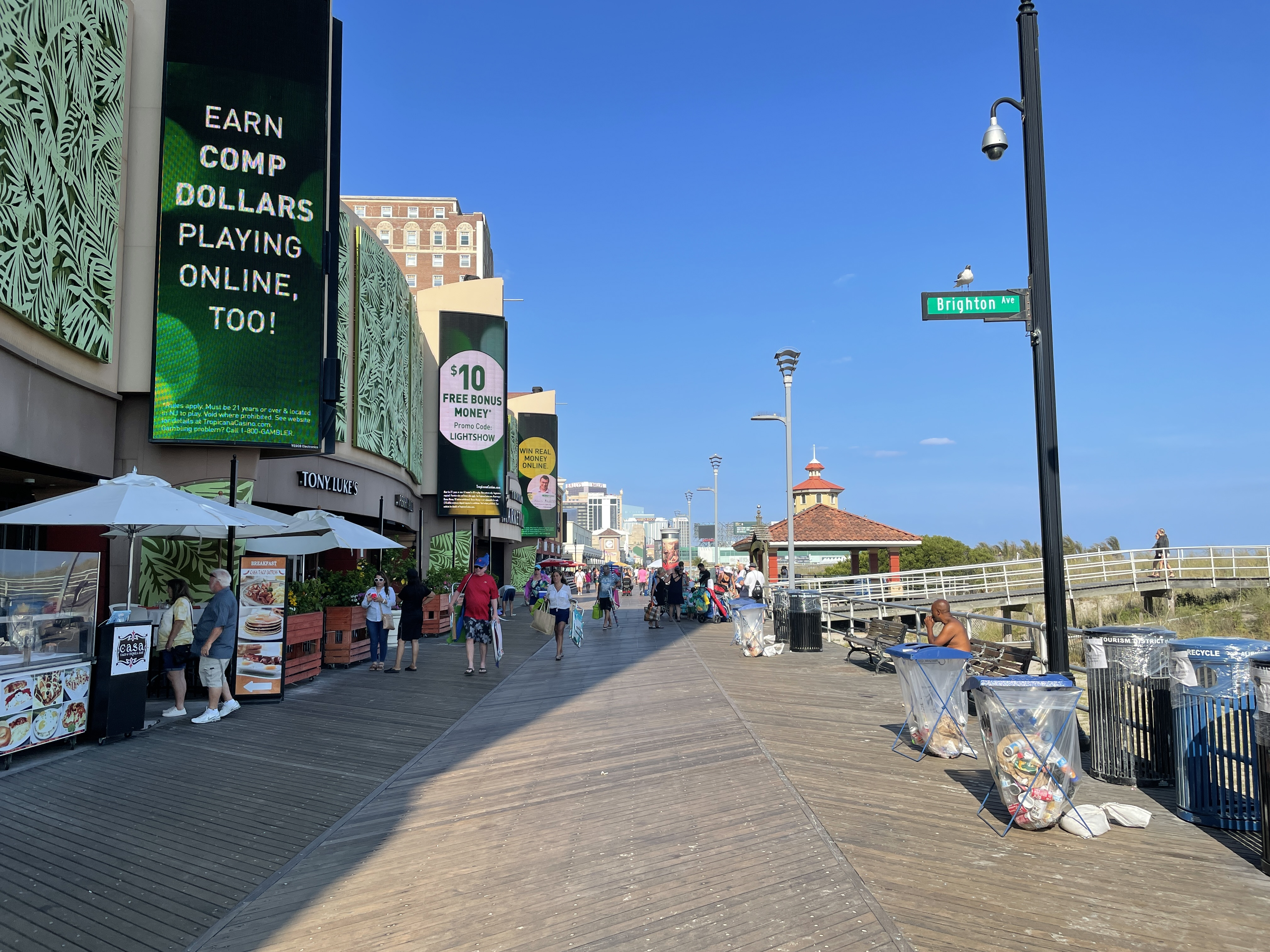
Atlantic City boardwalk at Brighton Avenue

The television show Boardwalk Empire, an American series from cable network HBO set in Atlantic City during the Prohibition era, raised interest in the Roaring Twenties-era city. Starring Steve Buscemi, the show was adapted from a chapter about historical criminal kingpin Enoch "Nucky" Johnson (who is renamed "Enoch Thompson" in the show) in Nelson Johnson's book, Boardwalk Empire: The Birth, High Times, and Corruption of Atlantic City.

=== Festivals and other recurring arts events ===
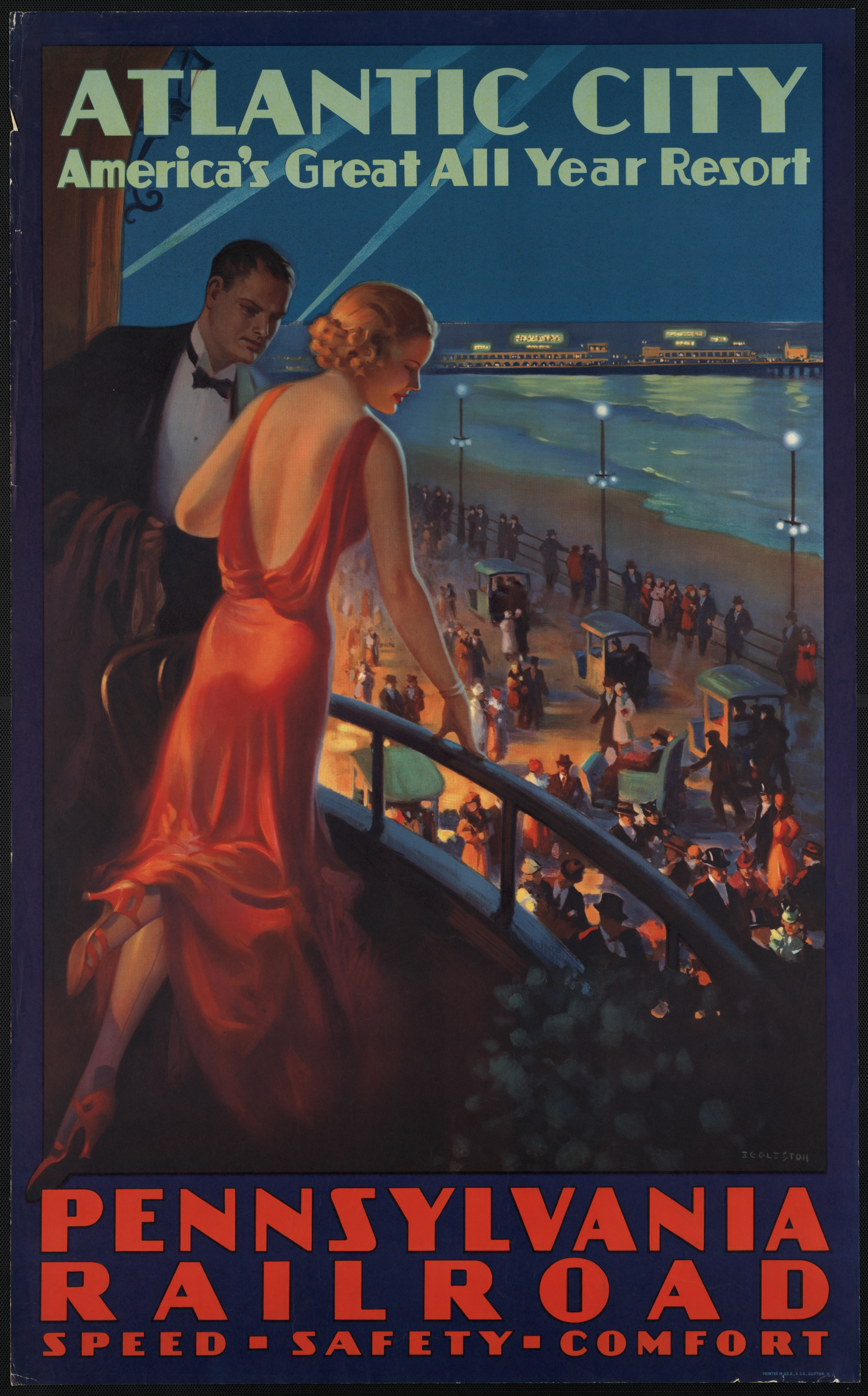
1930s Atlantic City promotional art by Edward Mason Eggleston.

- The TidalWave Music Festival is held on the Atlantic City beach in August, featuring country music. Acts have included Luke Bryan, Morgan Wallen, Dierks Bentley, Brooks & Dunn and Jason Aldean.
- The North to Shore Festival debuts in June 2023, billed as New Jersey's answer to SXSW. It will feature music and other entertainment at events in Asbury Park, Atlantic City and Newark throughout the month of June.
- The Adjacent Music Festival will hold its inaugural event in May 2023, centered around emo, pop-punk, and hardcore music, with Paramore and Blink-182 on the Atlantic City beach.
- The first Frantic City indie and punk festival took place in 2022 at Atlantic City's recently opened Orange Loop Amphitheater with Fred Armisen as MC.
- The Bamboozle festival was scheduled for Bader Field in May 2023, with acts including E-Town Concrete, Coi Leray, Ice Spice, Trippie Redd, Limp Bizkit, A Boogie Wit da Hoodie, and Papa Roach. The festival had been held from 2003 to 2012 in Asbury Park and in East Rutherford at the Meadowlands Sports Complex. The 2023 festival was cancelled weeks before the event, as required forms and fees had not been submitted to the city.
- An LGBTQ event known as the "Miss'd America Pageant" is held annually. Originally started in 1994 as a fundraiser for local LGBT charities, the event features drag queens on the runway in a similar manner to the Miss America pageant.
- Since 2003, Atlantic City has hosted Thunder over the Boardwalk, an annual airshow over the boardwalk. The yearly event, a joint venture between the New Jersey Air National Guard's 177th Fighter Wing along with several casinos, attracts over 750,000 visitors each year.

=== Religious events ===
- A Ratha Yatra is held by the ISKCON of Central Jersey in collaboration with the local Hindu community, with thousands of attendees every year.
- Faith and Law Enforcement March, held by the Atlantic City Police Department with various churches, temples and other religious institutions in the area.

=== The Orange Loop ===
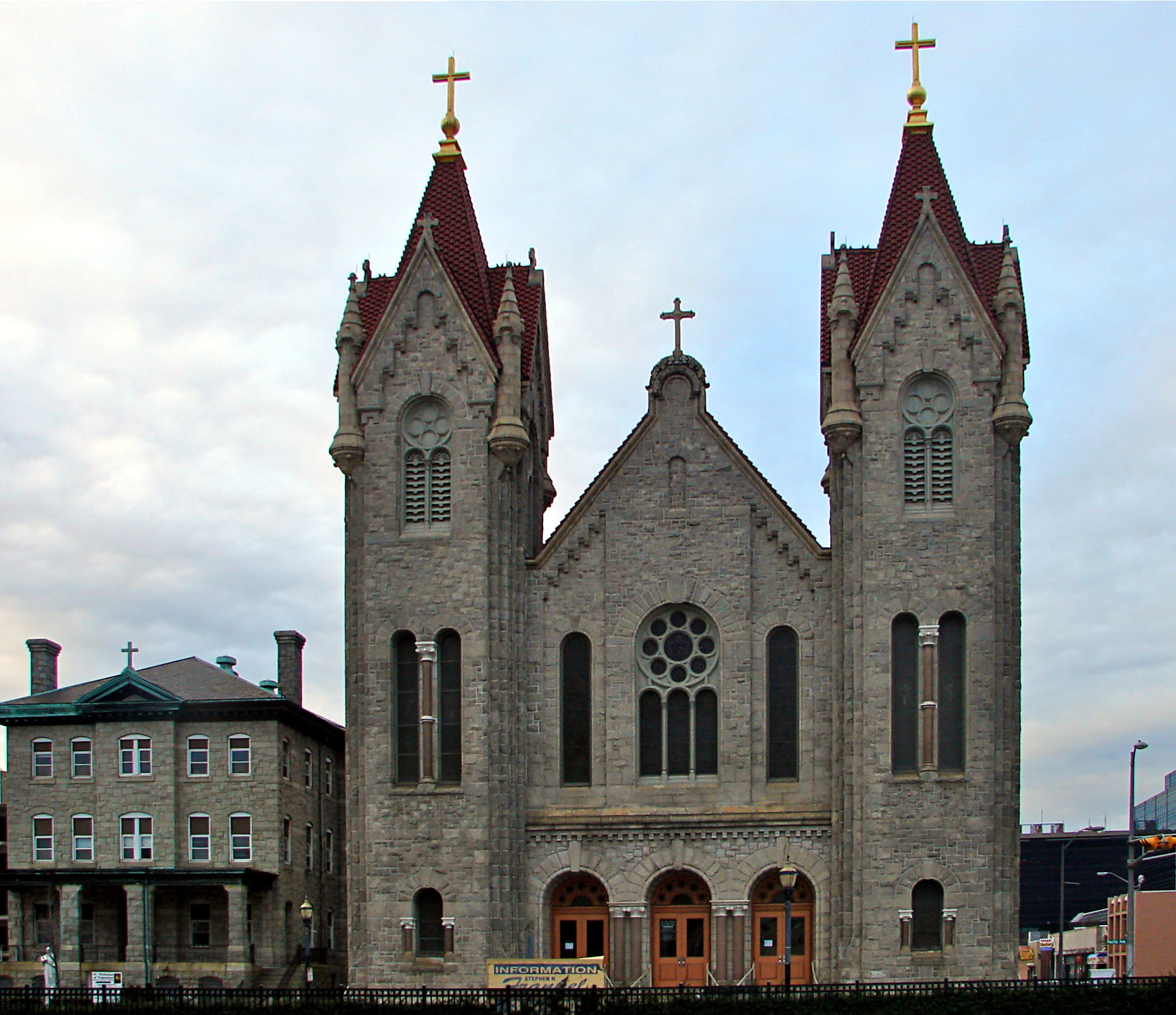
St. Nicholas of Tolentine Church on the Orange Loop.

The Orange Loop is a neighborhood near the beach in Atlantic City with a focus on live music establishments like Anchor Rock Club and Tennessee Beer Hall. It runs perpendicular from the boardwalk inland roughly to St. Nicholas of Tolentine Church. It is bounded by Tennessee Avenue, St. James Place, Pacific Avenue and the boardwalk, and derives its name from the orange color of those streets on a traditional Monopoly gameboard. The Orange Loop Amphitheater hosted the Frantic City indie rock music festival on the loop in 2022.

== Sports ==
Club	Sport	League	Venue	Year(s)
Atlantic City Blackjacks	Arena football	AFL	Boardwalk Hall	2019
Atlantic City FC	Soccer	NPSL	Silver Eagle Stadium	2018–present
Atlantic City Diablos	Soccer	NPSL	St. Augustine College Preparatory School	2007–2008
Atlantic City Boardwalk Bullies	Ice hockey	ECHL	Boardwalk Hall	2001–2005
Atlantic City CardSharks	Indoor football	NIFL	Boardwalk Hall	2004
Atlantic City Surf	Baseball	Can-Am League	Bernie Robbins Stadium	1998–2008
Atlantic City Seagulls	Basketball	USBL	Atlantic City High School	1996–2001

The Atlantic City Race Course in Hamilton Township was a horse racing track that operated from 1946 to 2015.

The ShopRite LPGA Classic is an LPGA Tour women's golf tournament held near Atlantic City since it started in 1986.

=== Professional boxing ===
Since February 2, 1887, the city of Atlantic City has seen 2,538 (as of September 2018) professional boxing fight programs, the first one being one with a main event fight between Willie Clark, 3-0-3, and debuting Horace Leeds, won by Clark on points over four rounds. During the 1980s, professional boxing activity boomed in Atlantic City, at times rivaling Las Vegas, Nevada, in staging major boxing fights. Fighters who fought in Atlantic City at that era include Marvelous Marvin Hagler, Thomas Hearns, Wilfredo Gómez, Jeff Chandler, Larry Holmes, George Foreman, Mike Tyson and others. Fights included The Brawl For it All, Tyson versus Holmes, Tyson versus Michael Spinks, and Roberto Durán versus Iran Barkley. Many boxing matches were held at Donald Trump's Trump Plaza, promoted either by Bob Arum or Don King.

== Parks and recreation ==
Atlantic City is one of five municipalities in the state—and the only one outside of Cape May County—that offer free public access to oceanfront beaches monitored by lifeguards, joining Wildwood, North Wildwood, Wildwood Crest and Upper Township's Strathmere section.

== Government ==
=== Local government ===
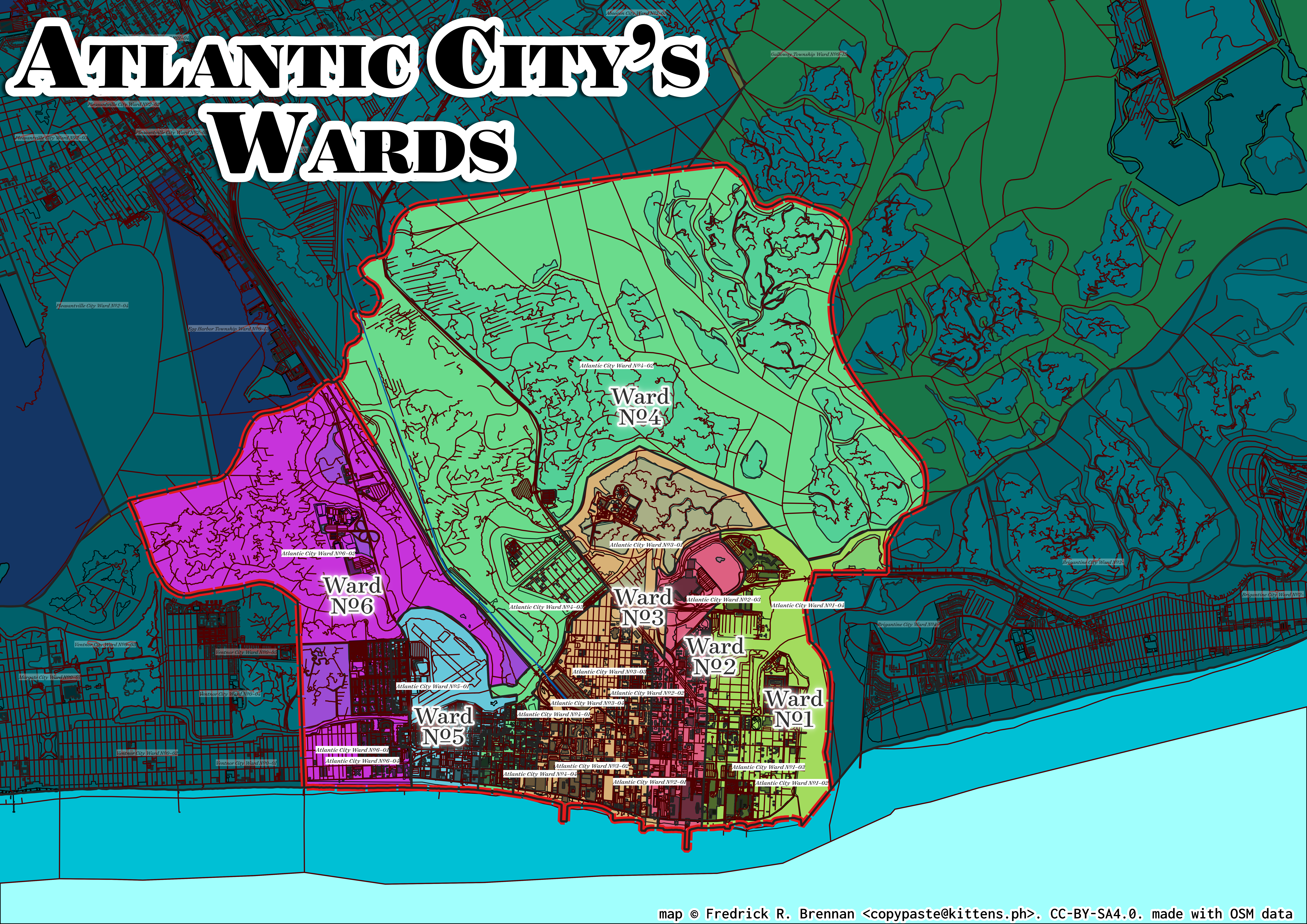
Electoral map of Atlantic City

Atlantic City
- Crime rates* (2019)

Violent crimes
- Homicide: 11 (0.03 per 1,000 (Note: based on 2022 census data))
- Rape: 29 (0.08)
- Robbery: 182 (0.47)
- Aggravated assault: 101 (0.26)
- Total violent crime: 323 (0.84)

Property crimes
- Burglary: 130 (0.34)
- Larceny-theft: 1,519 (3.95)
- Motor vehicle theft: 89 (0.23)
- Arson: 2 (0.01)
- Total property crime: 1,738 (4.51)
- Note: [c] based on 2022 census data Source: 2019 FBI "Crime in the U.S." UCR Data

Atlantic City is governed within the Faulkner Act (formally known as the Optional Municipal Charter Law) under the Mayor-Council system of municipal government (Plan D), implemented by direct petition effective as of July 1, 1982. The city is one of 71 municipalities (of the 564) statewide governed under this form. The governing body of Atlantic City comprises the Mayor and the City Council, all elected on a partisan basis to serve four-year terms of office as part of the November general election. The council includes nine members, who are elected on a staggered basis, with one member from each of six wards and three serving at-large. The six ward seats are up for election together and the mayoral seat and the council at-large seats are up for vote together two years later. The City Council exercises the legislative power of the municipality for the purpose of holding Council meetings to introduce ordinances and resolutions to regulate City government. In addition, Council members review budgets submitted by the Mayor; provide for an annual audit of the city's accounts and financial transactions; organize standing committees and hold public hearings to address important issues which impact Atlantic City. Former Mayor Bob Levy created the Atlantic City Ethics Board in 2007, but the Board was dissolved two years later by vote of the Atlantic City Council.

As of 2026, the Mayor is Democrat Marty Small Sr., whose term of office ends December 31, 2029. Small succeeded Frank M. Gilliam Jr. following his resignation on October 3, 2019. Small initially served as mayor on an interim basis for an unexpired term ending on December 31, 2021. Members of the City Council are Council President Council President Aaron "Sporty" Randolph (D, 2027; 1st Ward), Council Vice President Kaleem Shabazz (D, 2027; 3rd Ward), Patricia Bailey (D, 2029; At-Large), George "Animal" Crouch (D, 2027; 4th Ward), LaToya Dunston (D, 2027; Second Ward – elected to serve an unexpired term), Jesse O. Kurtz (R, 2027; 6th Ward), Maria Lacca (R, 2027; 5th Ward), Stephanie Marshall (D, 2029; At-Large), and Mohammed Suhel Ahmed (D, 2029; At-Large).

In 2024, Democrat Muhammed "Anjum" Zia, who served as a councilman for the 5th ward, was removed from office after it was found the he did not reside in Atlantic City, but instead with his family in Egg Harbor Township. He was ousted from the city council, and in a court-ordered special election that November, Republican Maria Lacca, who brought about the investigation against Zia, flipped the seat, becoming the first Republican to win it since 1988. She became one out of two Republicans now currently on Atlantic City's council, with the other being councilman Jesse O. Kurtz of the 6th ward.

In May 2020, voters rejected by a 3–1 margin a referendum that would have changed the city to a council-manager form of government which would have reduced the size of the city council and shifted responsibility for day-to-day operation from an elected mayor to an appointed city manager.

In December 2019, LaToya Dunston was selected from a list of three candidates nominated by the Democratic municipal committee to serve the remainder of the term of the Second Ward seat that had been held by Marty Small until he stepped down when he was appointed as mayor. In January 2020, Dunston was appointed to fill the Second Ward seat expiring in December 2023 that Small had won in November 2019 but declined to fill; Dunston will serve on an interim basis until the November 2020 general election, when voters will select a candidate to serve the balance of the term of office.

==== Mayoral disappearance and resignation ====
Following questions about false claims he had made about his military record, Mayor Bob Levy left City Hall in September 2007 in a city-owned vehicle for an unknown destination. After a 13-day absence, his lawyer revealed that Levy was in Carrier Clinic, a rehabilitation hospital. Levy resigned in October 2007 and then-Council President William Marsh assumed the office of Mayor and served six weeks until an interim mayor was named.

=== Federal, state and county representation ===
Atlantic City is located in the 2nd Congressional district and is part of New Jersey's 2nd state legislative district.

For the 119th United States Congress, New Jersey's 2nd congressional district is represented by Jeff Van Drew (R, Dennis Township). New Jersey is represented in the United States Senate by Democrats Cory Booker (Newark, term ends 2027) and Andy Kim (Moorestown, term ends 2031).

For the 2026–2027 session, the 2nd legislative district of the New Jersey Legislature is represented in the New Jersey Senate by Vincent J. Polistina (R, Egg Harbor Township) and in the General Assembly by Don Guardian (R, Atlantic City) and Maureen Rowan (D, Atlantic City).

Atlantic County is governed by a directly elected county executive and a nine-member Board of County Commissioners, responsible for legislation. The executive serves a four-year term and the commissioners are elected to staggered three-year terms, of which four are elected from the county on an at-large basis and five of the commissioners represent equally populated districts. As of 2025, Atlantic County's Executive is Dennis Levinson (R, Northfield), whose term of office ends December 31, 2027. Members of the Board of County Commissioners are:

Ernest D. Coursey (D, District 1-- Atlantic City, Egg Harbor Township (part), Longport, Margate City, and Ventnor City; 2025, Atlantic City), Chair Maureen Kern (R, District 2-- Egg Harbor Township (part), Linwood, Northfield, Somers Point and Pleasantville; 2027, Somers Point), Andrew Parker III (R, District 3-- Egg Harbor Township (part) and Hamilton Township (part); 2026, Egg Harbor Township), Richard R. Dase (R, District 4, including Brigantine, Galloway Township, Egg Harbor Township (part), and Port Republic; 2025, Galloway Township), Vice Chair James A. Bertino (R, District 5-- Buena, Buena Vista Township, Corbin City, Egg Harbor City, Estell Manor, Folsom, Hamilton Township (part), Hammonton, Mullica Township and Weymouth Township; 2027, Hammonton), June Byrnes (R, At-Large; 2026, Linwood), Michael Ruffu (R, At-Large; Margate, 2027) Amy L. Gatto (R, At-large; 2025, Hamilton Township) and John W. Risley (R, At-Large; 2026, Egg Harbor Township)

Atlantic County's constitutional officers are: Clerk Joesph J. Giralo (R, 2026, Hammonton), Sheriff Joe O'Donoghue (R, 2026, Egg Harbor Township) and Surrogate James Curcio (R, 2025, Hammonton).

=== Politics ===
As of March 23, 2011, there were a total of 20,001 registered voters in Atlantic City, of which 12,063 (60.3% vs. 30.5% countywide) were registered as Democrats, 1,542 (7.7% vs. 25.2%) were registered as Republicans and 6,392 (32.0% vs. 44.3%) were registered as Unaffiliated. There were 4 voters registered to other parties. Among the city's 2010 Census population, 50.6% (vs. 58.8% in Atlantic County) were registered to vote, including 67.0% of those ages 18 and over (vs. 76.6% countywide).

Gubernatorial election results for Atlantic City
Year	Republican		Democratic		Third party(ies)	
Year	No.	%	No.	%	No.	%
2025	2,185	26.98%	5,804	71.67%	109	1.35%
2021	2,108	33.20%	4,171	65.70%	70	1.10%
2017	1,067	22.02%	3,661	75.55%	118	2.43%
2013	2,897	39.94%	4,293	59.19%	63	0.87%
2009	1,578	23.13%	4,988	73.12%	256	3.75%
2005	1,206	18.80%	5,035	78.50%	173	2.70%

In the 2012 presidential election, Democrat Barack Obama received 9,948 votes (86.6% vs. 57.9% countywide), ahead of Republican Mitt Romney with 1,548 votes (13.5% vs. 41.1%) and other candidates with 49 votes (0.4% vs. 0.9%), among the 11,489 ballots cast by the city's 21,477 registered voters, for a turnout of 53.5% (vs. 65.8% in Atlantic County). In the 2008 presidential election, Democrat Barack Obama received 10,975 votes (82.1% vs. 56.5% countywide), ahead of Republican John McCain with 2,175 votes (16.3% vs. 41.6%) and other candidates with 82 votes (0.6% vs. 1.1%), among the 13,370 ballots cast by the city's 26,030 registered voters, for a turnout of 51.4% (vs. 68.1% in Atlantic County). In the 2004 presidential election, Democrat John Kerry received 8,487 votes (74.5% vs. 52.0% countywide), ahead of Republican George W. Bush with 2,687 votes (23.6% vs. 46.2%) and other candidates with 96 votes (0.8% vs. 0.8%), among the 11,389 ballots cast by the city's 23,310 registered voters, for a turnout of 48.9% (vs. 69.8% in the whole county).

Presidential elections results
Year	Republican	Democratic	Third Parties
2024	29.7% 3,106	67.6% 7,060	2.7% 244
2020	22.2% 2,879	77.0% 9,982	0.8% 105
2016	17.3% 1,800	80.9% 8,418	1.8% 184
2012	13.5% 1,548	86.6% 9,948	0.4% 49
2008	16.3% 2,175	82.1% 10,975	0.6% 82
2004	23.6% 2,687	74.5% 8,487	0.8% 96

In the 2013 gubernatorial election, Democrat Barbara Buono received 4,293 ballots cast (52.6% vs. 34.9% countywide), ahead of Republican Chris Christie with 2,897 votes (35.5% vs. 60.0%) and other candidates with 63 votes (0.8% vs. 1.3%), among the 8,155 ballots cast by the city's 23,049 registered voters, yielding a 35.4% turnout (vs. 41.5% in the county). In the 2009 gubernatorial election, Democrat Jon Corzine received 4,988 ballots cast (69.9% vs. 44.5% countywide), ahead of Republican Chris Christie with 1,578 votes (22.1% vs. 47.7%), Independent Chris Daggett with 157 votes (2.2% vs. 4.8%) and other candidates with 99 votes (1.4% vs. 1.2%), among the 7,141 ballots cast by the city's 22,585 registered voters, yielding a 31.6% turnout (vs. 44.9% in the county).

United States Senate election results for Atlantic City1
Year	Republican		Democratic		Third party(ies)	
Year	No.	%	No.	%	No.	%
2024	2,497	27.57%	6,227	68.76%	332	3.67%
2018	1,439	22.68%	4,627	72.91%	280	4.41%
2012	1,391	13.46%	8,770	84.87%	172	1.66%
2006	1,497	23.62%	4,700	74.17%	140	2.21%

United States Senate election results for Atlantic City2
Year	Republican		Democratic		Third party(ies)	
Year	No.	%	No.	%	No.	%
2020	2,438	19.76%	9,627	78.03%	272	2.20%
2014	1,027	17.22%	4,844	81.23%	92	1.54%
2013	697	18.16%	3,098	80.70%	44	1.15%
2008	1,844	16.74%	8,960	81.34%	211	1.92%

=== City and state agencies ===
==== New Jersey Casino Control Commission ====
The New Jersey Casino Control Commission is a New Jersey state governmental agency that was founded in 1977 as the state's Gaming Control Board, responsible for administering the Casino Control Act and its regulations to assure public trust and confidence in the credibility and integrity of the casino industry and casino operations in Atlantic City. Casinos operate under licenses granted by the commission. The commission is headquartered in the Arcade Building at Tennessee Avenue and Boardwalk in Atlantic City.

==== New Jersey Division of Gaming Enforcement ====
The New Jersey Division of Gaming Enforcement is a division of the New Jersey Department of Law and Public Safety and is responsible for certifying casino gaming revenue, registering casino employees and non-gaming vendors, licensing gaming vendors, and handling all casino patron complaints.

==== Casino Reinvestment Development Authority ====
The CRDA was founded in 1984 and is responsible for directing the spending of casino reinvestment funds in public and private projects to benefit Atlantic City and other areas of the state. From 1985 through April 2008, CRDA spent US$1.5 billion on projects in Atlantic City and US$300 million throughout New Jersey.

==== Atlantic City Convention and Visitors Authority ====
The Convention & Visitors Authority (ACCVA) was in charge of advertising and marketing for the city as well as promoting economic growth through convention and leisure tourism development. The ACCVA managed the Boardwalk Hall and Atlantic City Convention Center, as well as the Boardwalk Welcome Center inside Boardwalk Hall and a welcome center on the Atlantic City Expressway. In 2011, the ACCVA was absorbed into the CRDA as part of the state takeover that created the tourism district.

==== Atlantic City Special Improvement District ====
The Atlantic City Special Improvement District (SID) was a nonprofit organization created in 1992, funded by a special assessment tax on businesses within the improvement district. It carried out various activities to improve the city's business community, including street cleaning and promotional efforts. In 2011, the SID was absorbed by the CRDA; the former SID boundaries would be expanded to the include all areas in the newly formed tourism district. Under the new structure, established by state legislation, the CRDA assumed responsibility for the staff, equipment and programs of the SID. The new SID division includes a SID committee made up of CRDA board members and an advisory council consisting of the current trustees and others.

== Fire department ==
Atlantic City Fire Department (ACFD)

Operational area
- Country: United States
- State: New Jersey
- City: Atlantic City

Agency overview
- Established: April 4, 1904
- Staffing: Career
- Fire chief: Scott Evans
- EMS level: BLS First Responder
- IAFF: 198

Facilities and equipment
- Divisions: 1
- Battalions: 1
- Stations: 6
- Engines: 7
- Trucks: 3
- Rescues: 1
- HAZMAT: 1
- USAR: 1
- Fireboats: 2
- Light and air: 1

Website
- acfdlocal198.com

The Atlantic City Fire Department (ACFD) provides fire protection and first responder emergency medical services to the city. The ACFD operates out of six fire stations, located throughout the city in one battalion, under the command of a battalion chief, who in-turn reports to an on-duty Deputy Chief, or Tour Commander each shift.

=== Fire station locations ===
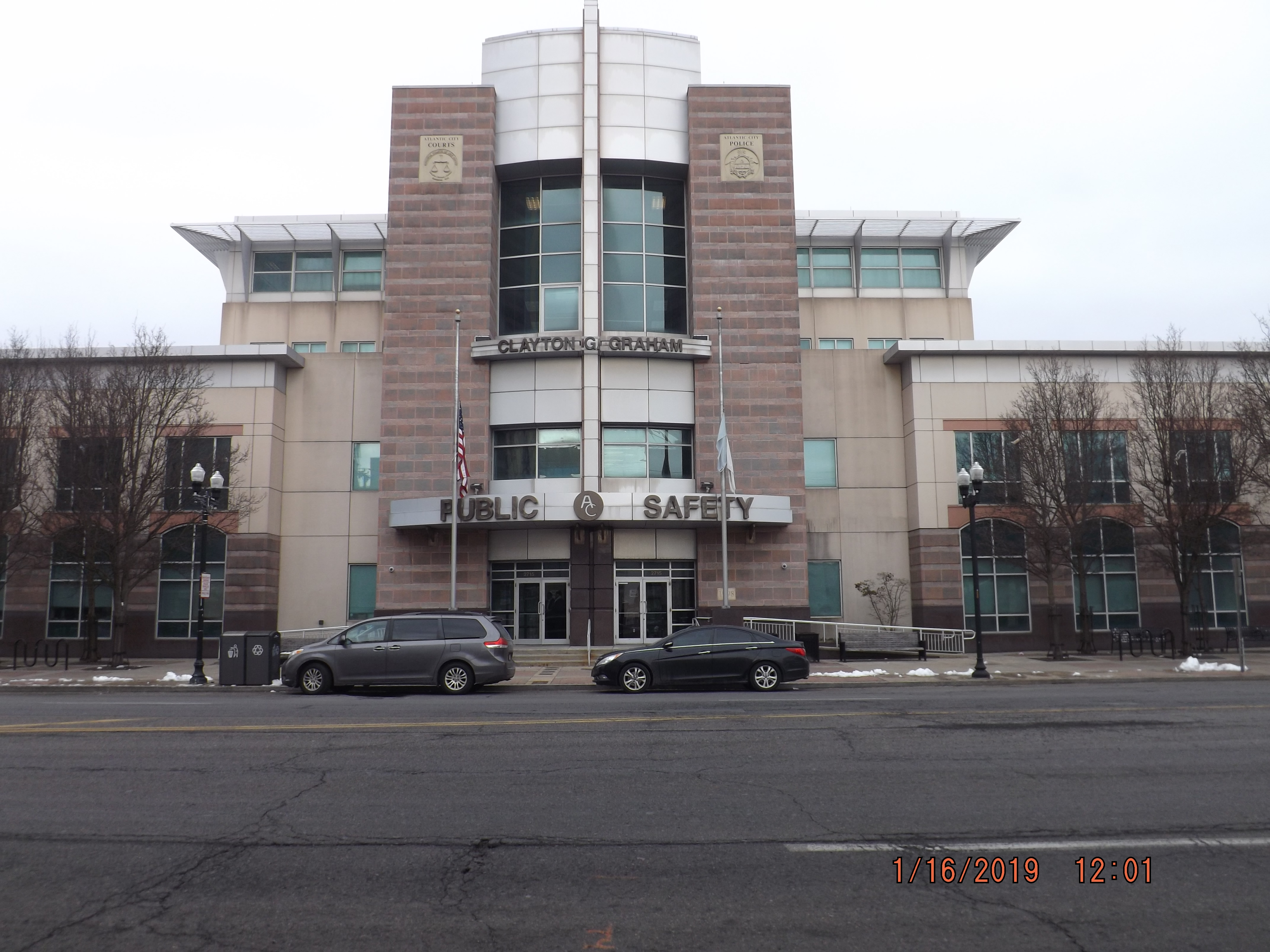
Headquarters;
2715 Atlantic Ave

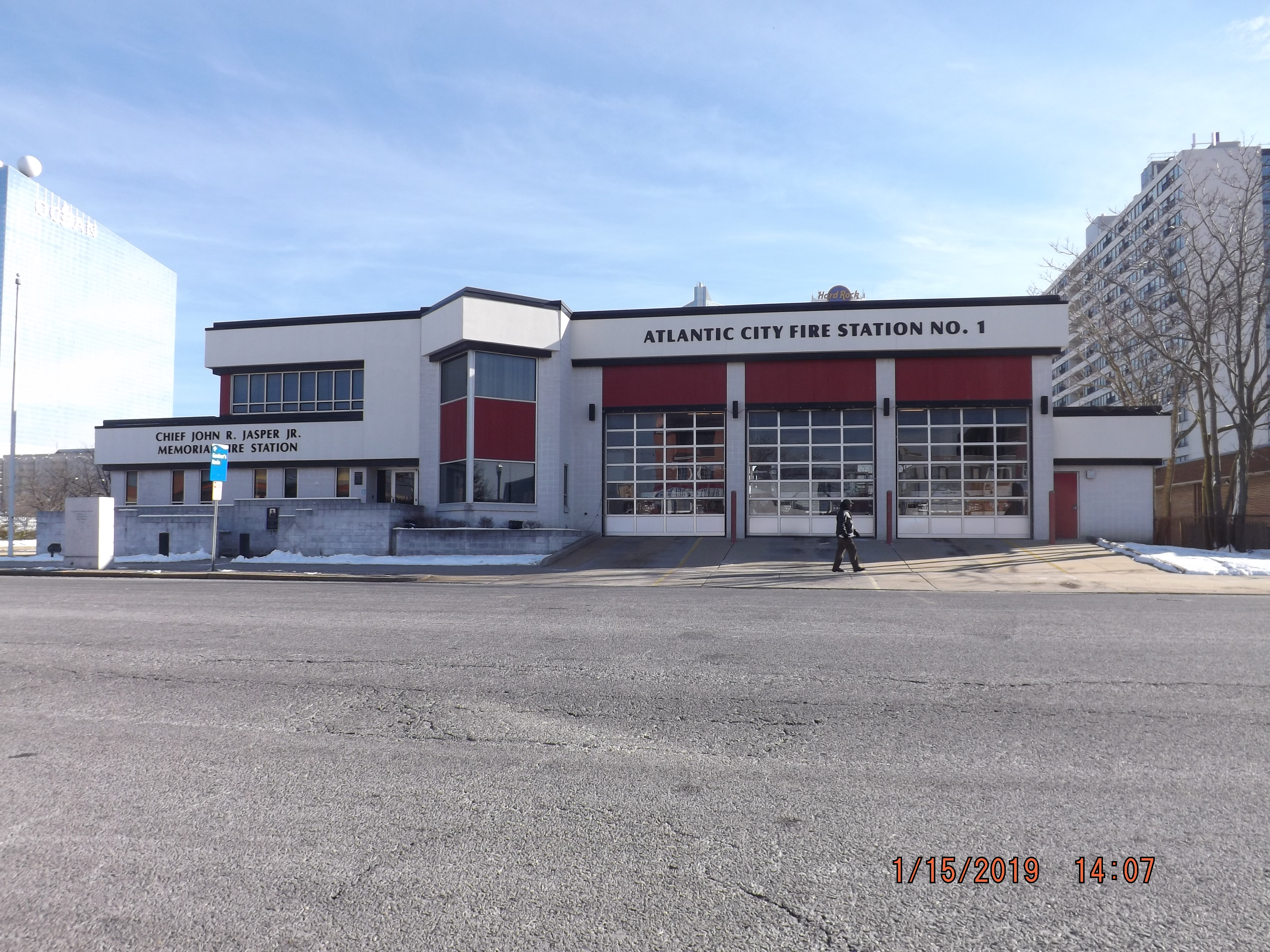
Station 1; Atlantic Ave & Maryland Ave. Engine 1, Tower Ladder 1, Battalion Chief 1, Haz-Mat 1

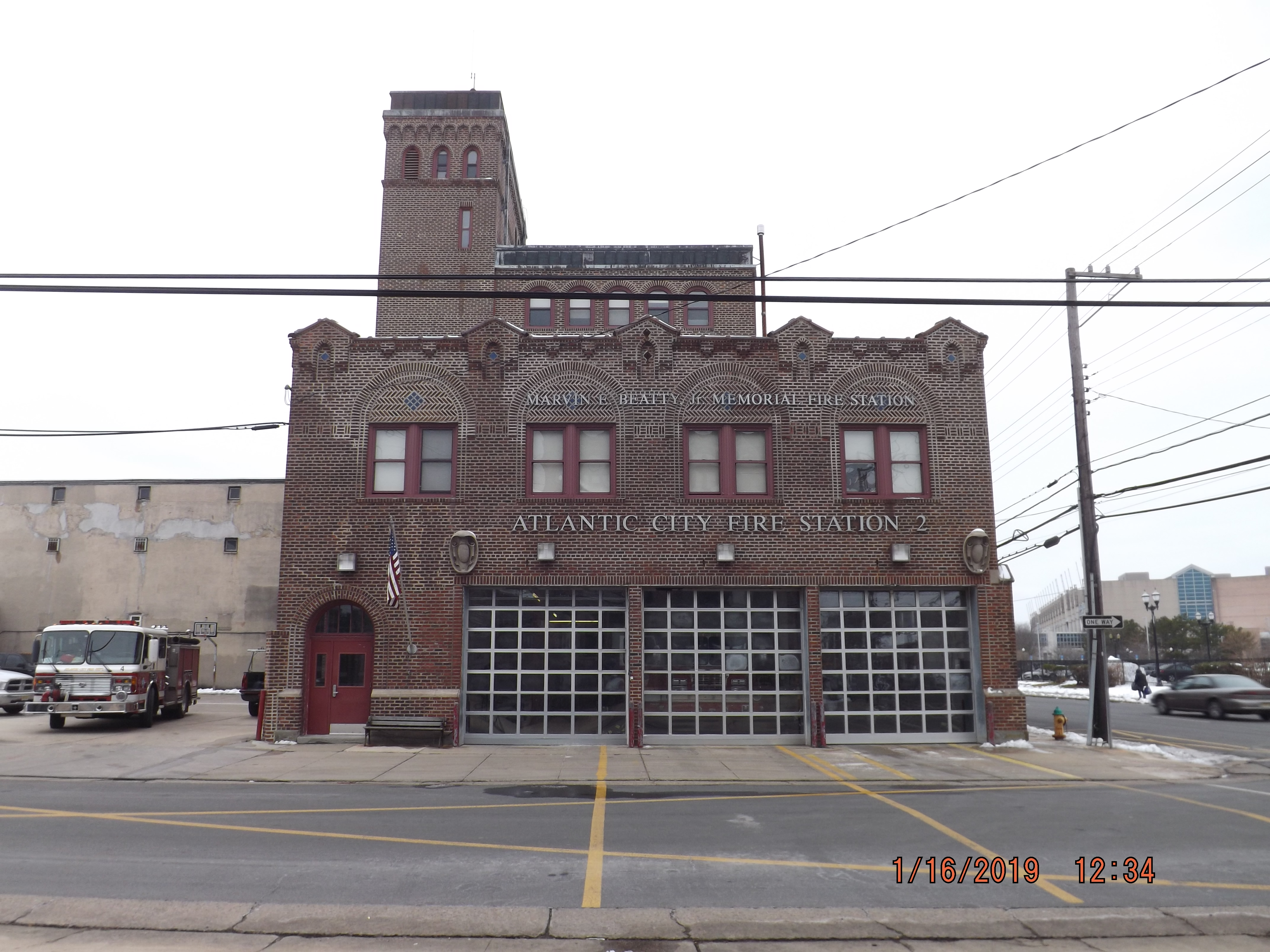
Station 2; Baltic Ave & North Indiana Ave. Engine 2, Rescue 1, Collapse Rescue Unit, Fire Boats 1&2

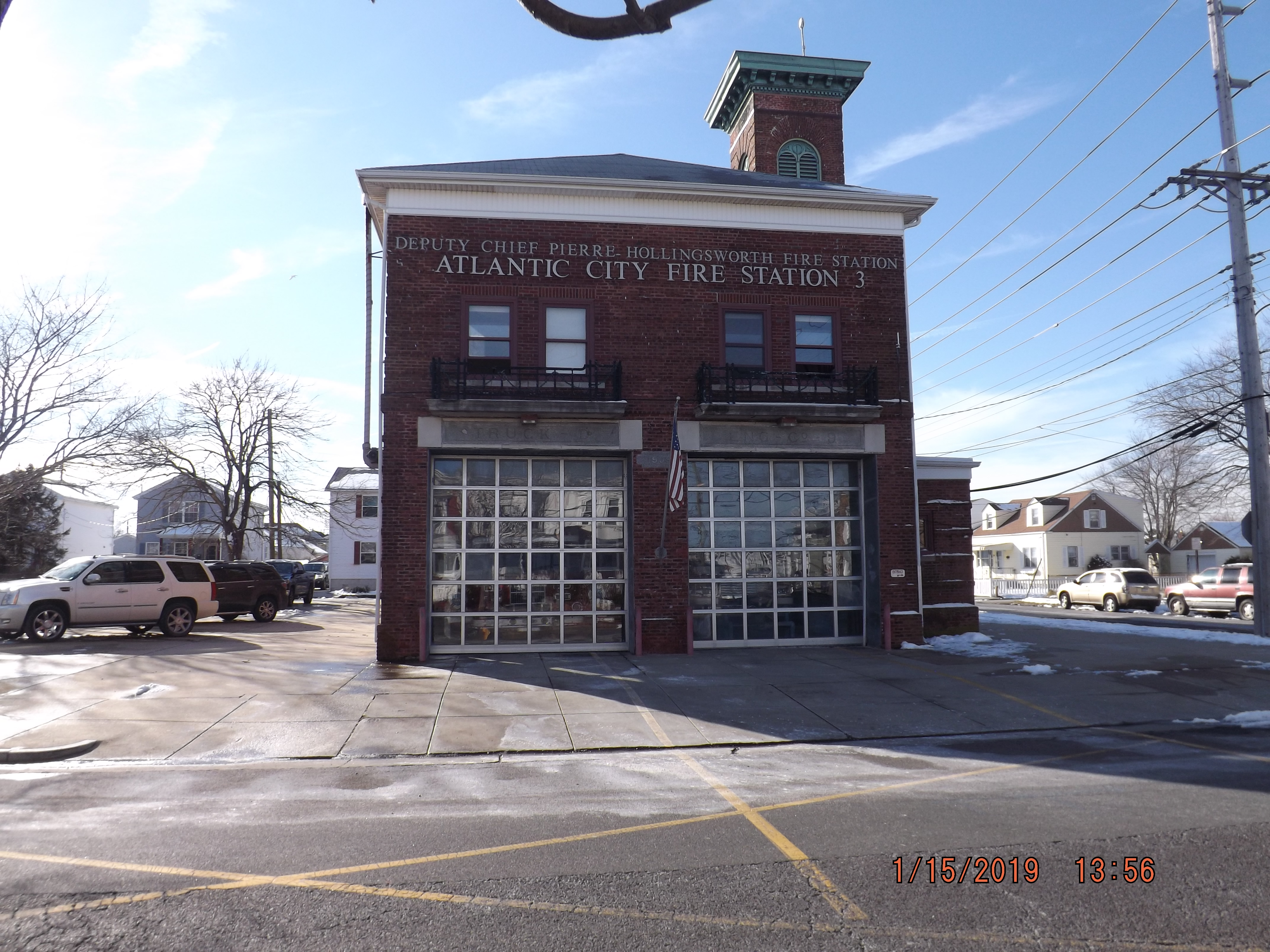
Station 3; North Indiana Ave & Grant Ave. Engine 3, Ladder 3 (Tiller)

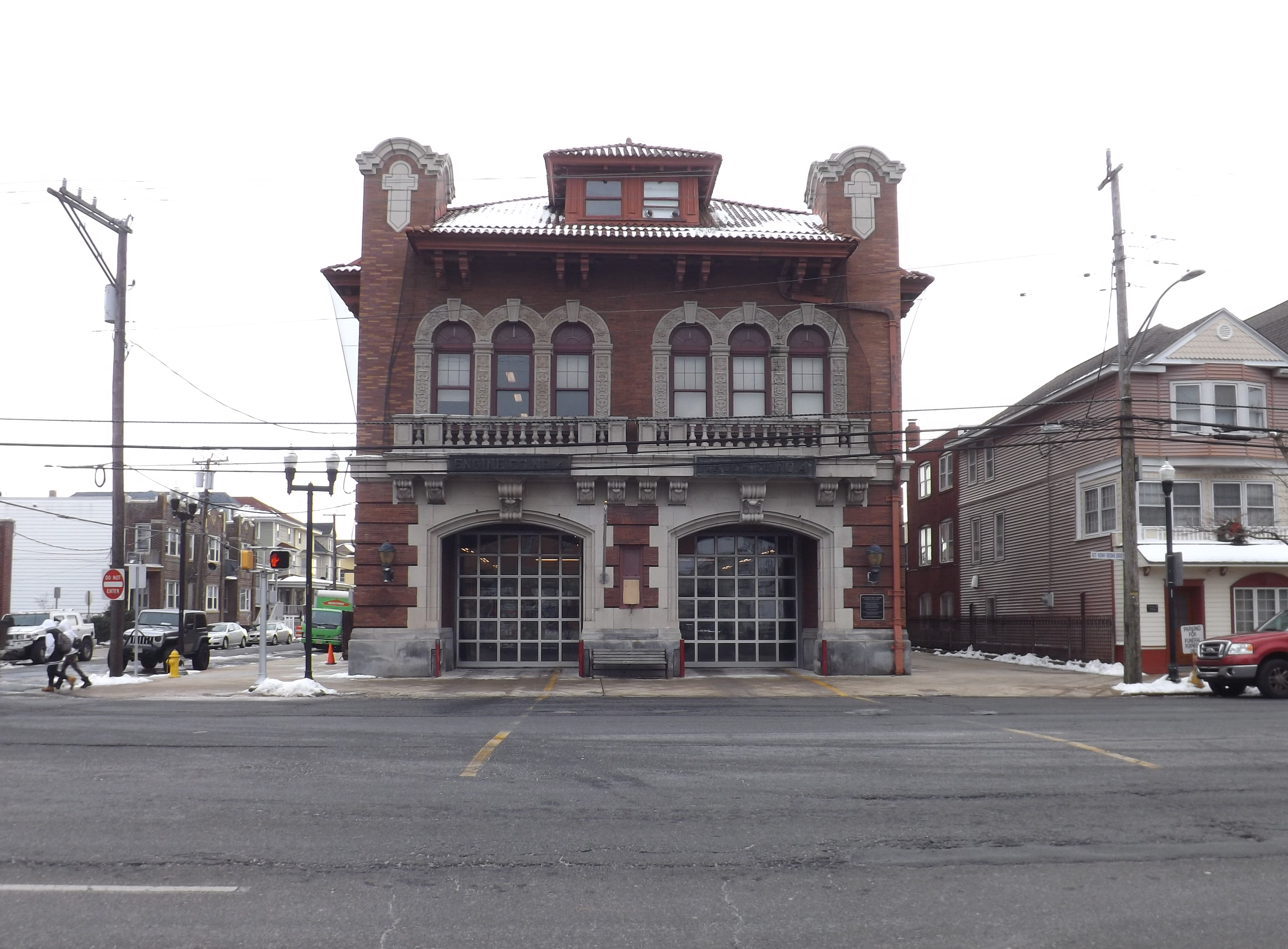
Station 4; Atlantic Ave & South Carolina Ave. Engine 4, Ladder 2 (Tiller), Deputy Chief 1

Station 5; Bader Field. Engine 5, Air Cascade Unit 1

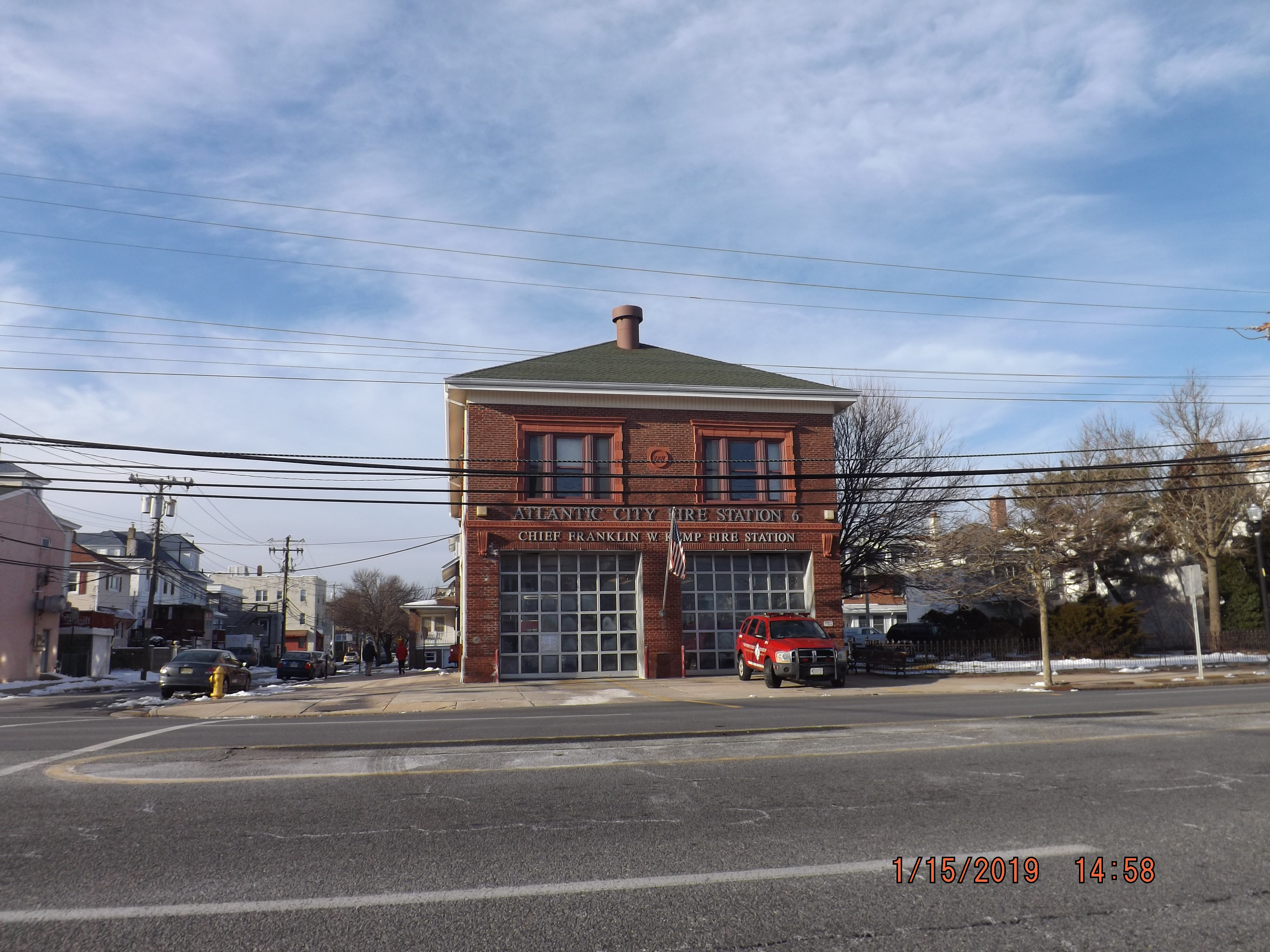
Station 6; Atlantic Ave & South Annapolis Ave. Engine 6, Engine 7

== Police department ==
The city is protected by the Atlantic City Police Department, which handles 150,000 calls per year. The Chief of Police is James A. Sarkos.

== Education ==
The Atlantic City School District serves students in pre-kindergarten through twelfth grades. As of the 2020–21 school year, the district, comprised of 11 schools, had an enrollment of 6,553 students and 617.3 classroom teachers (on an FTE basis), for a student–teacher ratio of 10.6:1. Schools in the district (with 2020–21 enrollment data from the National Center for Education Statistics) are Venice Park School (36 students in PreK), Brighton Avenue School (315 students; in grades PreK-5), Chelsea Heights School (332; PreK-8), Dr. Martin Luther King Jr. School Complex (543; PreK-8), New York Avenue School (548; PreK-8), Pennsylvania Avenue School (549; PreK-8), Richmond Avenue School (615; PreK-8), Sovereign Avenue School (696; PreK-8), Texas Avenue School (499; K-8), Uptown School Complex (536; PreK-8) and Atlantic City High School (1,771; 9–12). Pennsylvania Avenue School opened for the 2012–13 school year, with most students shifting from New Jersey Avenue School, which had been one of the district's oldest and most rundown schools.

Students from Brigantine, Longport, Margate City and Ventnor City attend Atlantic City High School as part of sending/receiving relationships with the respective school districts.

City public school students are also eligible to attend the Atlantic County Institute of Technology in the Mays Landing section of Hamilton Township or the Charter-Tech High School for the Performing Arts, located in Somers Point.

Oceanside Charter School, which offered pre-Kindergarten through eighth grade, was founded in 1999 and closed in June 2013 when its charter was not renewed by the New Jersey Department of Education.

Founded in 1908, Our Lady Star of the Sea Regional School is a Catholic elementary school, operates under the jurisdiction of the Diocese of Camden.

Nearby college campuses include those of Atlantic Cape Community College and Stockton University, the latter of which offers classes and resources in the city such as the Carnegie Library Center, which was turned back to the control of the city in April 2022.

== Media outlets ==
=== Newspapers and magazines ===
- The Press of Atlantic City

the diving horse magazine

Former publications:

- Atlantic City Insiders
- Atlantic City Weekly
- Casino Connection

=== Radio stations ===
- WEHA 88.7 FM – Gospel
- WAYV 95.1 FM – Top 40
- WTTH 96.1 FM – Urban AC
- WFPG 96.9 FM – AC (Lite Rock 96.9)
- WENJ 97.3 FM – Sports
- WTKU 98.3 FM – Classic hits (Kool 98.3)
- WZBZ 99.3 FM – Rhythmic (The Buzz)
- WZXL 100.7 FM – Rock (The Rock Station)
- WLRB 102.7 FM – Contemporary Christian (K-Love)
- WMGM 103.7 FM – Active rock (WMGM Rocks)
- WSJO 104.9 FM – Top 40 (SoJo 104.9)
- WPUR 107.3 FM – Country (Cat Country 107.3)
- WWJZ 640 AM – Religious
- WMID 1340 AM – Oldies
- WOND 1400 AM – News/Talk
- WPGG 1450 AM – Talk
- WBSS 1490 AM – Regional Mexican

=== Television stations ===
Atlantic City is part of the Philadelphia television market. There are six stations licensed in the area.

- WACP Channel 4 Atlantic City (Total Christian Television)
- WMGM-LP Channel 7 Atlantic City (Silent)
- WMGM-TV Channel 40 Wildwood (True Crime Network)
- W45CP-D Channel 45 Atlantic City (Daystar)
- W48DP-D Channel 48 Atlantic City (EICB TV)

== Infrastructure ==
=== Transportation ===
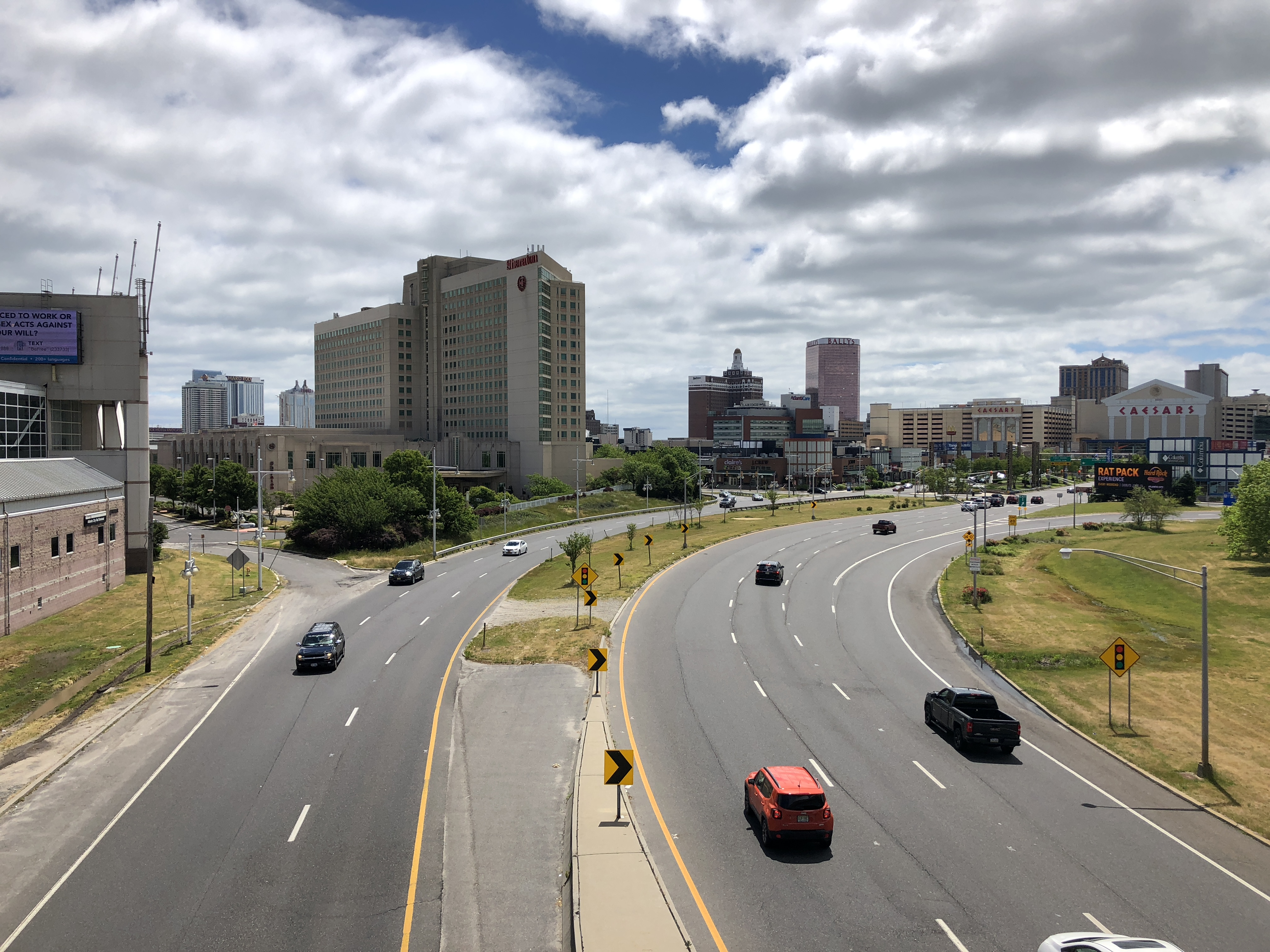
Eastern terminus of the Atlantic City Expressway in Atlantic City

==== Roads and highways ====
As of May 2010, the city had a total of 103.67 mi (166.84 km) of roadways, of which 88.26 mi (142.04 km) were maintained by the municipality, 1.29 mi (2.08 km) by Atlantic County, 5.32 mi (8.56 km) by the New Jersey Department of Transportation and 8.80 mi (14.16 km) by the South Jersey Transportation Authority.

The three roadways that enter Atlantic City are: Black Horse Pike/Harding Highway (US 322/40 via the Albany Avenue drawbridge), White Horse Pike (US 30), and the Atlantic City Expressway through the Brigantine Connector. Atlantic City is roughly 132 mi (212 km) south of New York City via the Garden State Parkway and 55 mi (89 km) southeast of Philadelphia.

==== Public transportation ====
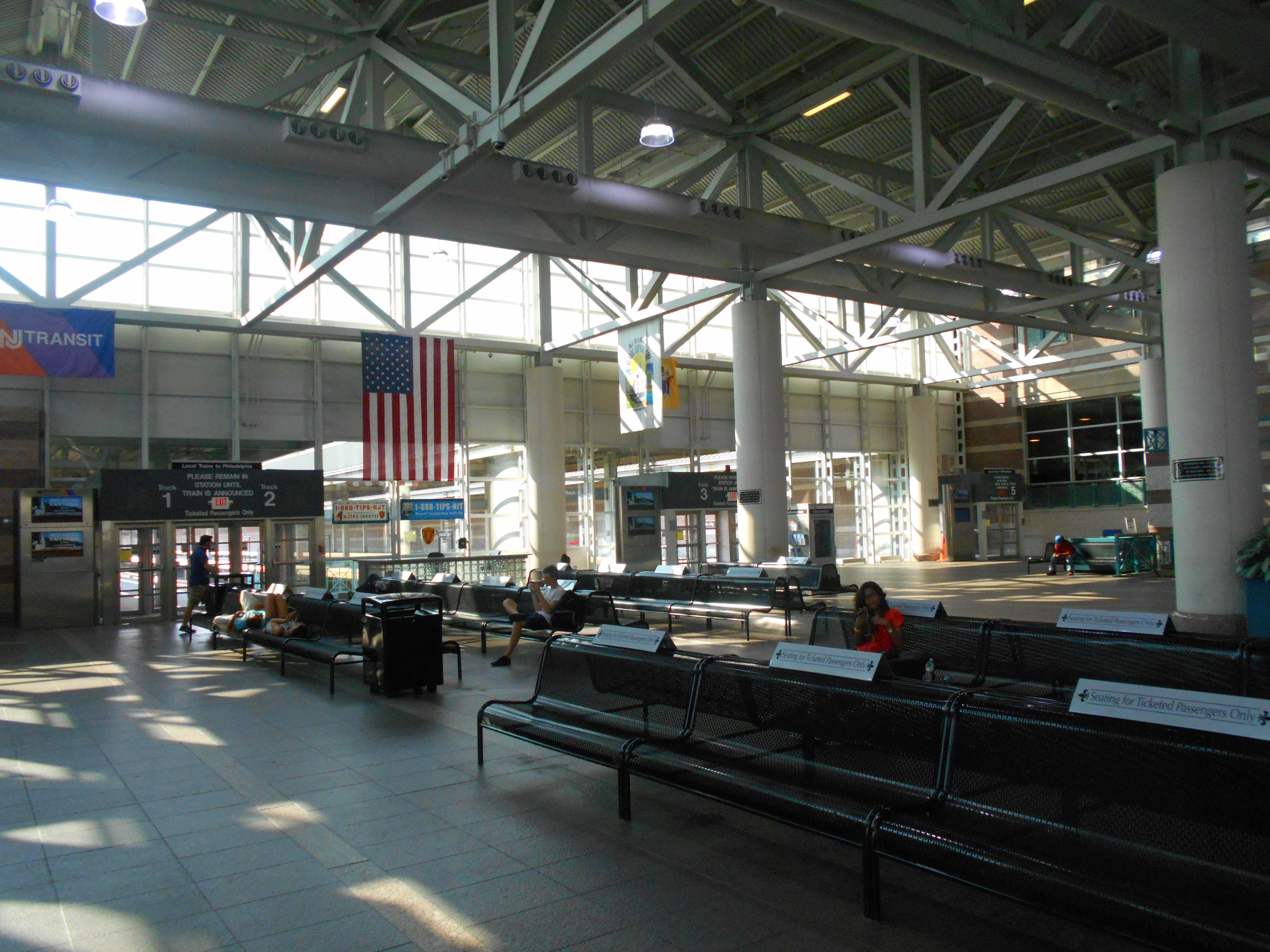
Atlantic City Rail Terminal

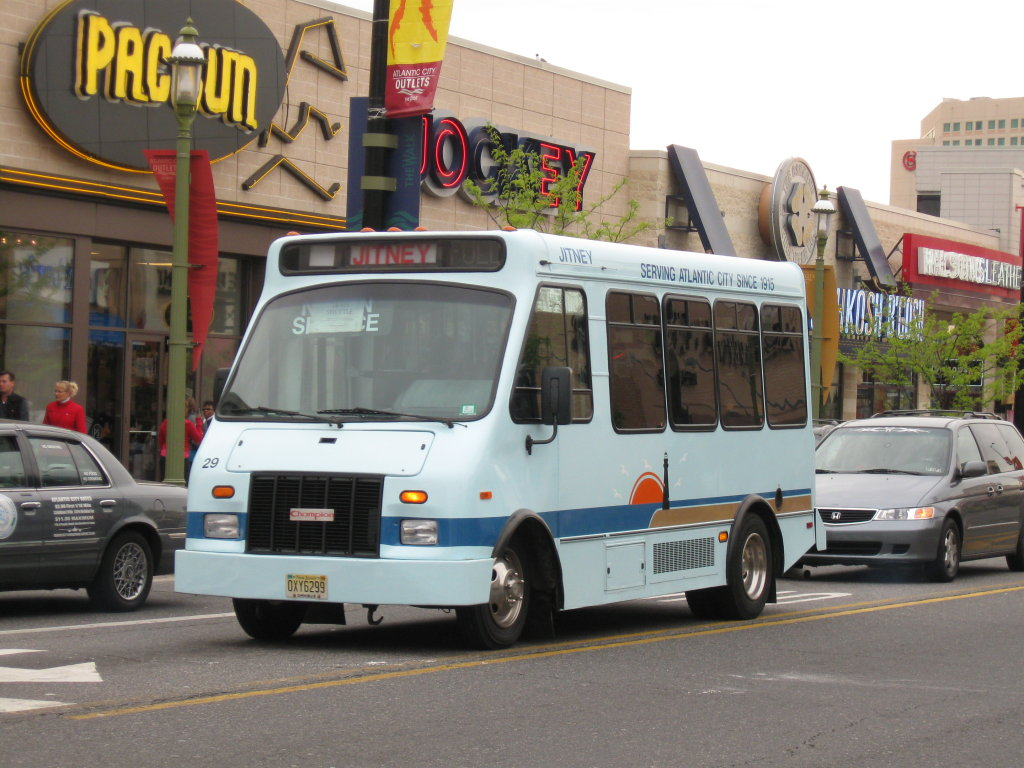
ACJA "Jitney" No. 29 on a casino shuttle run

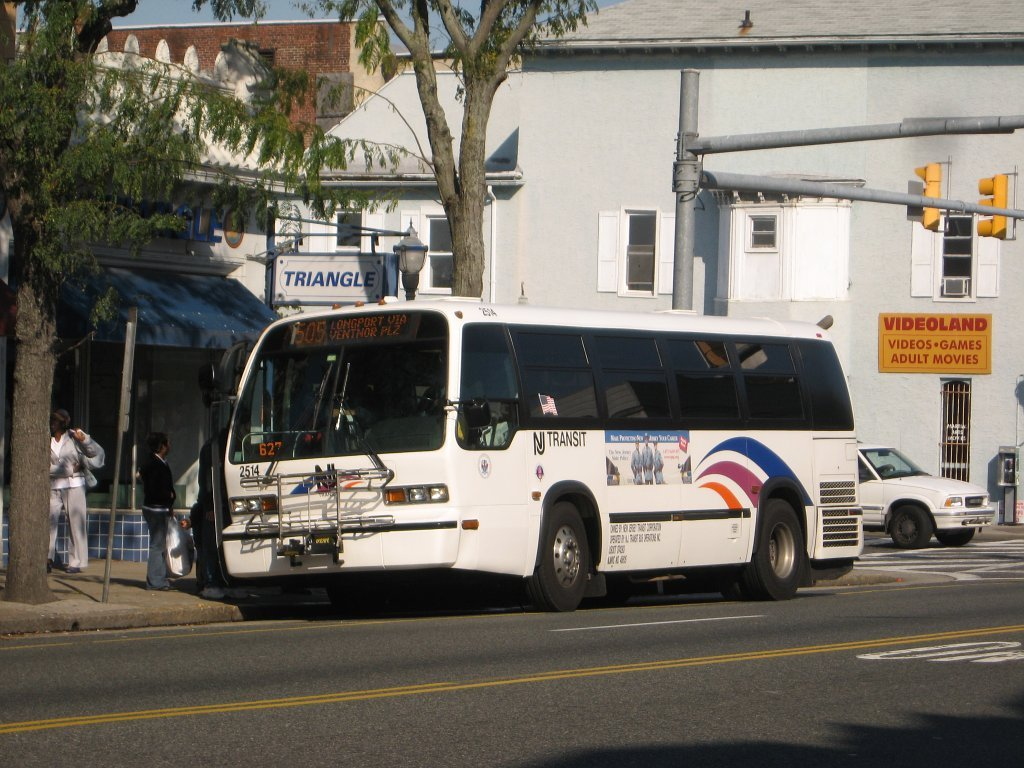
NJ Transit #2514 on the 505

Atlantic City is connected to other cities in several ways. NJ Transit's Atlantic City Rail Terminal at the Atlantic City Convention Center provides service from 30th Street Station in Philadelphia through several smaller South Jersey communities via the Atlantic City Line.

In June 2006, the board of NJ Transit approved a three-year trial of express train service between New York Penn Station and the Atlantic City Rail Terminal. The line, known as ACES (Atlantic City Express Service), ran from February 2009 to March 2012. The approximate travel time was 2 1/2 hours, with a stop at Newark Penn Station, and was part of the casinos' multimillion-dollar investments in Atlantic City. Most of the funding for the transit line was provided by Harrah's Entertainment (owners of both Harrah's Atlantic City and Caesars Atlantic City) and the Borgata, which pulled the plug after millions in losses.

The Atlantic City Bus Terminal is the home to local, intrastate and interstate bus companies including NJ Transit, OurBus and Greyhound bus lines. The Greyhound Lucky Streak Express offers service to Atlantic City from New York City, Brooklyn, Philadelphia, Baltimore, and Washington, D.C. In addition to stopping at the Atlantic City Bus Terminal, Greyhound buses stop at various casinos in Atlantic City. Martz Trailways provides bus service to various casinos in Atlantic City from Wilkes-Barre, Scranton, and White Haven in Pennsylvania. Klein Transportation provides bus service to various casinos in Atlantic City from Shillington, Douglassville, Royersford, and Audubon in Pennsylvania.

Within the city, public transportation is provided by NJ Transit along 13 routes, including service between the city and the Port Authority Bus Terminal in Midtown Manhattan on the 319 route, and service to and from Atlantic City on routes 501 (to Brigantine Beach), 502 (to Atlantic Cape Community College), 504 (to Ventnor Plaza), 505 (to Longport), 507 (to Ocean City), 508 (to the Hamilton Mall), 509 (to Ocean City), 551 (to Philadelphia), 552 (to Cape May), 553 (to Upper Deerfield Township), 554 (to the Lindenwold PATCO station) and 559 (to Lakewood Township).

The Atlantic City Jitney Association (ACJA) offers service on four fixed-route lines and on shuttles to and from the rail terminal.

==== Airline service ====
Commercial airlines serving Atlantic City include Atlantic City International Airport, located 9 mi (14 km) northwest of the city in Egg Harbor Township. Many travelers also fly into Philadelphia International Airport, Trenton-Mercer Airport, or Newark Liberty International Airport, where there are wider selections of carriers from which to choose. The historic downtown Bader Field airport is now permanently closed and plans are in the works to redevelop the land. In 2022, the CASA MAR project was announced, a $3 billion plan to redevelop Bader Field into a mixed-use complex that includes housing and employment opportunities.

Atlantic City International Airport, which is served by various scheduled chartered flight company, is a focus city for Spirit Airlines

=== Healthcare ===
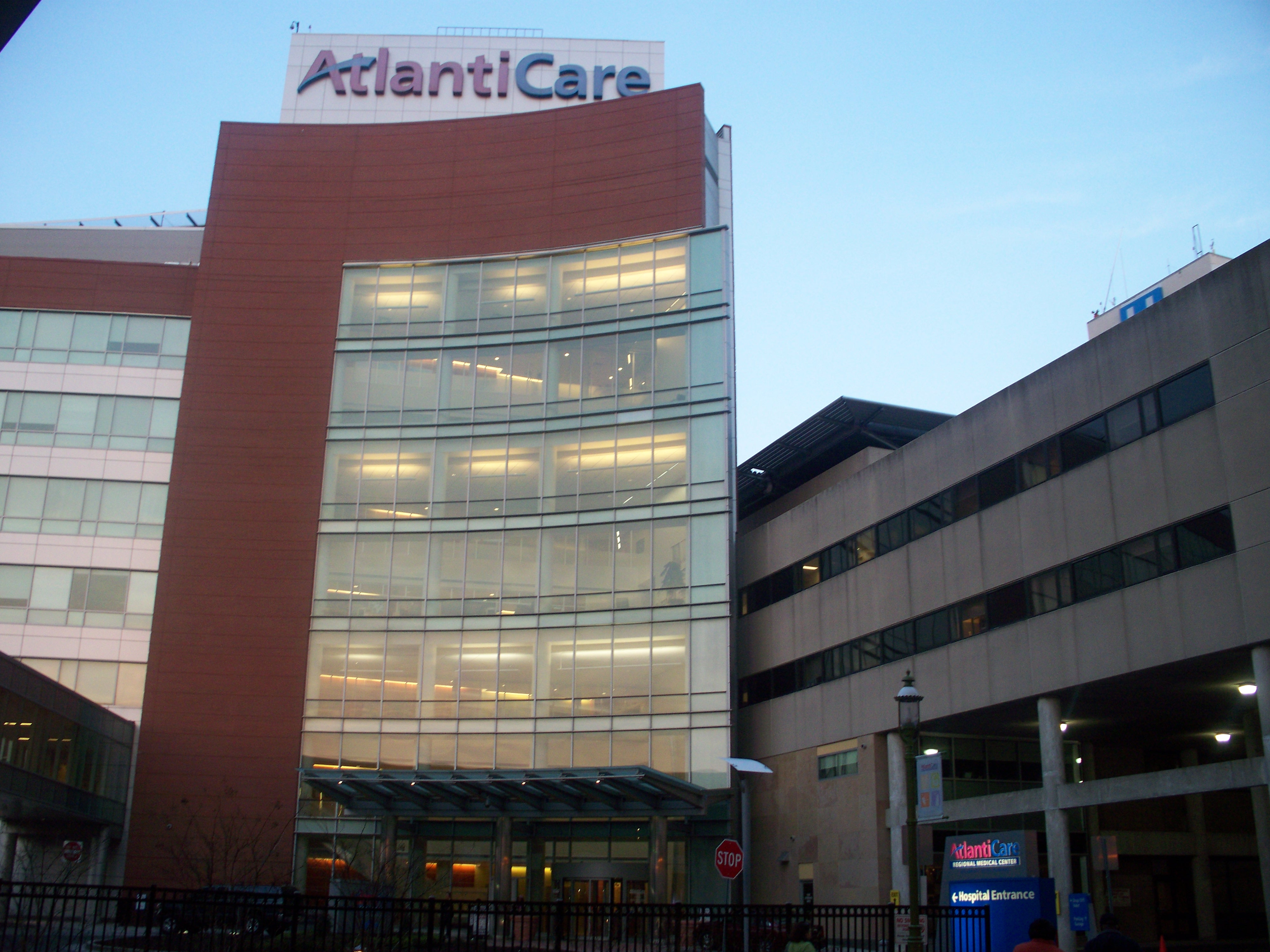
AtlantiCare Regional Medical Center, Mainland Campus in Galloway Township

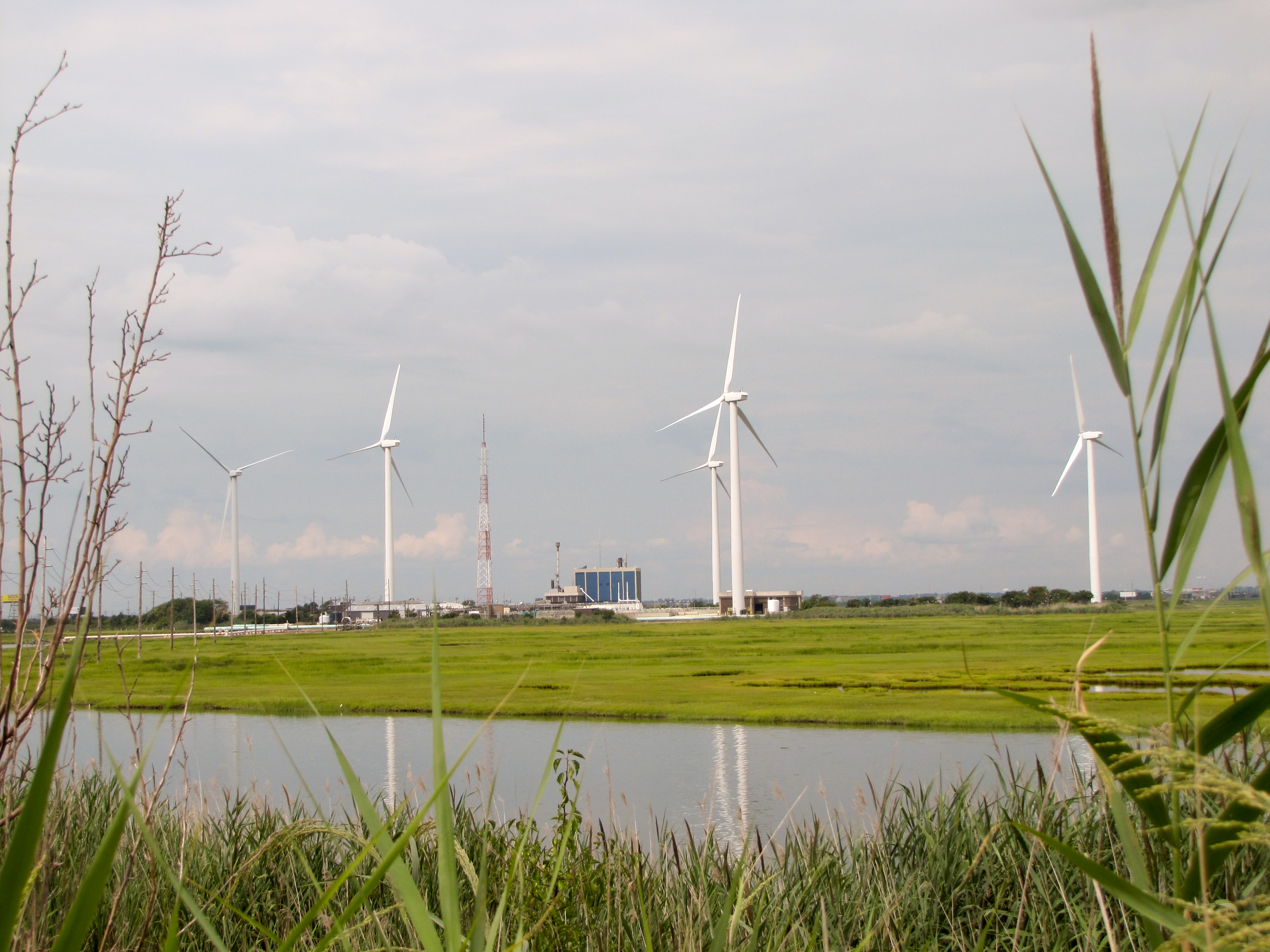
Jersey-Atlantic Wind Farm is the first coastal wind farm in the United States.

The AtlantiCare Regional Medical Center is a health system based in Atlantic City. Founded in 1898, it includes two hospitals; the Atlantic City Campus and the Mainland Campus in Pomona, New Jersey. It has Atlantic City's only cancer institute, heart institute, and neonatal intensive care unit.

=== Utilities ===
South Jersey Industries provides natural gas to the city under the South Jersey Gas division. Marina Energy and its subsidiary, Energenic, a joint business venture with a long-time business partner, operate two thermal power stations in the city. The Marina Thermal Plant serves the Borgata while a second plant serves the Resorts Hotel and Casino. Another thermal plant is the Midtown Thermal Control Center on Atlantic and Ohio Avenues built by Conectiv, which opened in 1997 and provides chilled water for hotels and other facilities along the Boardwalk.

Electrical power in Atlantic City and its immediate surrounding area is provided primarily served Atlantic City Electric, which was incorporated in 1924 and provides power from the Beesley's Point Generating Station in Upper Township and other locations.

The Jersey-Atlantic Wind Farm, opened in 2005, is the first onshore coastal wind farm in the United States. In October 2010, North American Offshore Wind Conference was held in the city and included tours of the facility and potential sites for further development. In February 2011, the state passed legislation permitting the construction of windmills for electricity along pre-existing piers, such as the Steel Pier. The first phase of the Atlantic Wind Connection, a planned electrical transmission backbone along the Jersey Shore was planned to be operational in 2013.

== In popular culture ==
Atlantic City is featured prominently in films, television, and music, including:

- Films: The King of Marvin Gardens (1972), Atlantic City (1980), The Godfather Part III (1990), Rounders (1998), and Snake Eyes (1998).
- Television: Mr. Belvedere, The Simpsons, How I Met Your Mother, The Sopranos, and Boardwalk Empire.
- Music: Atlantic City is lyrically mentioned or the primary subject of "On the Boardwalk (In Atlantic City)" by June Haver (1946) and "Atlantic City" by Bruce Springsteen (1982).

== Notable people ==
People who were born in, residents of, or otherwise closely associated with Atlantic City include:

- Hakeem Abdul-Shaheed (born 1959), convicted drug dealer and organized crime leader
- Jack Abramoff (born 1958), former lobbyist who was embroiled in high-profile political scandals. Abramoff was born in Atlantic City and lived there until age 10
- Robert Agnew (born 1953), professor of sociology at Emory University and president of the American Society of Criminology
- Joe Albany (1924–1988), jazz pianist
- Abdullah Anderson (born 1996), defensive end for the Atlanta Falcons
- James Avery (1945–2013), actor best known for portrayal of patriarch Philip Banks, Will Smith's character's uncle, in TV series The Fresh Prince of Bel-Air
- Harry Bacharach (1873–1947), mayor of Atlantic City in 1912 for six months, again from 1916 to 1920, and again from 1930 to 1935
- Isaac Bacharach (1870–1956), represented New Jersey's 2nd congressional district from 1915 to 1937
- Edward L. Bader (1874–1927), mayor from 1920 to 1927
- Joseph Carleton Beal (1900–1967), co-writer of the Christmas song Jingle Bell Rock
- Barry Beckham (born 1944), playwright and novelist
- Edwin Blum (1906–1995), screenwriter for films Stalag 17 and The New Adventures of Tarzan
- Jack Boucher (1931–2012), photographer for National Park Service for more than 40 years beginning in 1958, chief photographer for the Historic American Buildings Survey
- Bugs Bower (1922–2020), composer, music arranger, bandleader and record producer
- Fredrick Brennan (born 1994), software developer and type designer who founded the imageboard website 8chan
- Horace J. Bryant (1909–1983), first African American to serve in a State Cabinet position in New Jersey
- Benjamin Burnley (born 1978), musician, best known as lead vocalist, rhythm guitarist and primary songwriter for band Breaking Benjamin
- Greg Buttle (born 1954), linebacker who played in the NFL for the New York Jets
- Mark H. Buzby (born 1956), former United States Navy rear admiral who serves as Administrator of the United States Maritime Administration
- Carole Byard (1941–2017), visual artist and illustrator of children's books, who was the recipient of a Caldecott Medal and multiple Coretta Scott King Awards
- Harry Carroll (1892–1962), songwriter who composed music for "I'm Always Chasing Rainbows", "The Trail of the Lonesome Pine" and "By the Beautiful Sea"
- Rosalind Cash (1938–1995), actress nominated for an Emmy Award for PBS production of Go Tell It on the Mountain
- Rocky Castellani (1926–2008), middleweight boxer best known for split-decision loss to Sugar Ray Robinson in which he knocked Robinson down in the sixth round
- Vera Coking, property owner who prevailed in her battle to oppose Donald Trump's efforts to acquire her boarding house using eminent domain
- Jack Collins (born 1943), Speaker of the New Jersey General Assembly from 1996 until 2002, making him the longest-serving speaker in Assembly history
- Lawrence J. Delaney (born 1935), scientist and businessman who served as Assistant Secretary of the Air Force (Acquisition)
- Al Dempster (1911–2001), animation background artist who worked for Walt Disney Animation Studios
- Stuart Dischell (born 1954), poet and professor of English at University of North Carolina at Greensboro
- Bruce Ditmas (born 1946), jazz drummer and percussionist
- Sidney Drell (1926–2016), theoretical physicist and arms control expert
- Robert Ettinger (1918–2011), academic, known as "the father of cryonics" based on the impact of his 1962 book The Prospect of Immortality
- Frank S. Farley (1901–1977), member of New Jersey Legislature for 34 years, boss of Republican political machine that controlled the Atlantic City and Atlantic County governments
- Vera King Farris (1938–2009), third president of Stockton University
- Andrew Fields, collegiate basketball coach and a retired professional basketball player
- Chris Ford (born 1949), head coach of the Boston Celtics, Milwaukee Bucks, Los Angeles Clippers and Philadelphia 76ers
- Helen Forrest (1917–1999), singer for three of the most popular big bands of the Swing Era, earning reputation as "the voice of the name bands"
- Anne Francine (1917–1999), actress and cabaret singer
- John F. Gaffney (1934–1995), politician who served in the New Jersey General Assembly, where he represented the 2nd Legislative District from 1992 until his death
- John J. Gardner (1845–1921), represented New Jersey's 2nd congressional district from 1885 to 1893, mayor of Atlantic City 1868–1875
- Patsy Garrett (1921–2015), actress
- Milton W. Glenn (1903–1967), represented New Jersey's 2nd congressional district from 1957 to 1965
- Myron Goldfinger (1933–2023), architect best known for designing large angular abstract houses in New York and New Jersey
- William Green (born 1979), NFL running back who played for the Cleveland Browns
- Marjorie Guthrie (1917–1983), dancer of the Martha Graham Company and dance teacher who was the wife of folk musician Woody Guthrie
- Cornelia Hancock (1840–1927), volunteer nurse who served the injured and infirmed of the Union Army during the American Civil War
- John R. Hargrove Sr. (1923–1997), federal judge appointed by President Ronald Reagan to the United States District Court for the District of Maryland
- Celestine Tate Harrington (1956–1998), quadriplegic street musician known for playing keyboard with her lips, teeth and tongue on the Atlantic City boardwalk
- James Hillman (1926–2011), developer of archetypal psychology
- Pete Hunter (born 1980), cornerback who played in the NFL for the Seattle Seahawks
- Walter S. Jeffries (1893–1954), represented New Jersey's 2nd congressional district from 1939 to 1941
- Candy Jones (1925–1990), fashion model, writer and radio talk show host
- Marvin Josephson (1927–2022), talent agent and executive, who was the founder of ICM Partners
- Allan Kaprow (1927–2006), painter and pioneer in establishing concepts of performance art, who influenced Fluxus
- Amy Kennedy (born 1978), educator, mental health advocate and politician who was the Democratic-Party nominee in the 2020 election to represent New Jersey's 2nd congressional district
- Marie Kibler (1912–1978), artistic gymnast who competed at the 1936 Summer Olympics and placed fifth with the American team
- Pinky Kravitz (1927–2015), radio broadcaster and print journalist who hosted "Pinky's Corner" on WOND from an array of Atlantic City locations from 1958 until a few months before his death in 2015, hosted "WMGM presents Pinky!" for years on WMGM-TV and wrote columns for many periodicals including The Press of Atlantic City
- Martha Krebs, theoretical physicist who directed the Office of Science and Technology Policy for the United States Department of Energy and is the founding director for the California NanoSystems Institute at UCLA
- JoAnna LaSane (1935–2019), model, dancer and arts administrator
- Lee B. Laskin (1936–2024), attorney, politician and judge who served in both houses of the New Jersey Legislature before being appointed to serve on the New Jersey Superior Court
- Jacob Lawrence (1917–2000), artist known for depicting African-American life in his paintings. Born on Arctic Avenue
- E. Grey Lewis (1940–2005), lawyer who served as General Counsel of the Navy
- Bill Libby (1927–1984), sportswriter and biographer best known for his books on sports, including 65 on sports figures
- Valerie Mack, identified as a victim in the Gilgo Beach serial killings
- James J. McCullough (born 1942), politician who served in the New Jersey Senate from 2007 to 2008, where he represented the 2nd Legislative District
- Don McGahn (born 1968), White House Counsel and Assistant to the President for U.S. President Donald Trump and a former Commissioner of the United States Federal Election Commission
- Bob Merrill (1921–1998), songwriter and screenwriter
- Arnold Newman (1918–2006), photographer, noted for his "environmental portraits" of artists and politicians
- John P. O'Neill (1952–2001), FBI terrorist specialist who was director of security at the World Trade Center and died in the September 11th, 2001 terrorist attacks
- Joshua Ozersky (1967–2015), food writer and historian
- Chris Pallies (1957–2019), professional wrestler known as King Kong Bundy
- Reese Palley (1922–2015), "Merchant to the Rich", entrepreneur, art dealer, writer, and sailor
- Joseph B. Perskie (1885–1957), Associate Justice of the New Jersey Supreme Court from 1933 to 1947
- Jacqueline Reses, businesswoman, investor, author and philanthropist
- Monique Samuels, television personality best known as a cast member of the reality television series The Real Housewives of Potomac
- Alfredo Silipigni (1932–2006), conductor and founder of New Jersey State Opera
- Jeremy Slate (1926–2006), actor and songwriter
- George Smathers (1913–2007), United States Senator from Florida
- Larry Steele (1913–1980), impresario known for his revues with black casts, based in Club Harlem
- Dave Thomas (1932–2002), founder of Wendy's fast-food restaurant, was born in Atlantic City
- Jean Webster (1935–2011), cook who operated Sister Jean's Kitchen, a soup kitchen serving free meals to the poor of Atlantic City
- Jim Whelan (1948–2017), member of New Jersey Senate who represented the 2nd Legislative District until his death and was Mayor of Atlantic City from 1990 to 2001
- Norman Joseph Woodland (1921–2012), inventor of the barcode
- Albert Zugsmith (1910–1993), film producer

== See also ==
- Atlantic City Sandpipers
- Chicken Bone Beach
- Kentucky Avenue Renaissance Festival

== Notes ==
Preceded by Brigantine	Beaches of New Jersey	Succeeded by Ventnor City
