= List of radio stations in New Jersey =

The following is a list of FCC-licensed radio stations in the U.S. state of New Jersey, which can be sorted by their call signs, frequencies, cities of license, licensees, and programming formats.

== List of radio stations ==
Call sign	Frequency	City of License	Licensee	Format
WAJM	88.9 FM	Atlantic City	Atlantic City Board of Education	Freeform/Educational
WAWZ	99.1 FM	Zarephath	Pillar of Fire Church	Contemporary Christian
WAYV	95.1 FM	Atlantic City	iHM Licenses, LLC	Top 40 (CHR)
WBBO	98.5 FM	Ocean Acres	Press Communications, LLC	Top 40 (CHR)
WBGO	88.3 FM	Newark	Newark Public Radio	Jazz
WBHX	99.7 FM	Tuckerton	Press Communications, LLC	Classic hits
WBJB-FM	90.5 FM	Lincroft	Brookdale Community College	Adult album alternative
WBNJ	91.9 FM	Barnegat	WWN Educational Radio Corporation	Adult standards
WBSS	1490 AM	Pleasantville	Longport Media	Regional Mexican
WBZC	88.9 FM	Pemberton	Four Rivers Community Broadcasting Corporation	Contemporary Christian
WCFA-LP	101.5 FM	Cape May	Center for Community Arts, Inc.	Variety
WCFT-LP	107.9 FM	Dover	Calvary Chapel Morris Hills	Religious Teaching
WCHR	1040 AM	Flemington	Townsquare License, LLC	Religious
WCHR-FM	105.7 FM	Manahawkin	Townsquare License, LLC	Classic rock
WCMC	1230 AM	Wildwood	The Jersey Giant WMID, LLC	Oldies
WCNM	103.9 FM	Hazlet	Cantico Nuevo Ministry, Inc.	Religious
WCNU-LP	102.5 FM	Bridgeton	Tri-County Community Action Agency, Inc.	Spanish
WCTC	1450 AM	New Brunswick	Beasley Media Group, LLC	Sports (FSR)
WCVH	90.5 FM	Flemington	Hunterdon Central High School Board of Education	Country
WCZT	98.7 FM	Villas	Coastal Broadcasting Systems, Inc.	Hot adult contemporary
WDBK	91.5 FM	Blackwood	Camden County College	Alternative rock
WDEL-FM	101.7 FM	Canton	FM Radio Licenses, LLC	News/Talk
WDHA-FM	105.5 FM	Dover	Beasley Media Group, LLC	Mainstream rock
WDNJ	88.1 FM	Hopatcong	Youngshire Media, Inc.	Religious
WDVR	89.7 FM	Delaware Township	Penn-Jersey Educational Radio Corp.	Variety
WEHA	88.7 FM	Port Republic	Spread the Gospel, Inc.	Gospel
WEMG	1310 AM	Camden	Mega-Philadelphia, LLC, Debtor in Possession	Spanish contemporary
WENJ	97.3 FM	Millville	Townsquare License, LLC	Sports (ESPN Radio)
WEZW	93.1 FM	Wildwood Crest	Educational Media Foundation	Christian adult contemporary (K-Love)
WFDU	89.1 FM	Teaneck	Fairleigh Dickinson University	College radio
WFJS	1260 AM	Trenton	Domestic Church Media Foundation	Religious
WFJS-FM	89.3 FM	Freehold	Domestic Church Media Foundation	Religious
WFMU	91.1 FM	East Orange	Auricle Communications	Freeform/eclectic
WFPG	96.9 FM	Atlantic City	Townsquare License, LLC	Adult contemporary
WGHT	1500 AM	Pompton Lakes	Borough of Pompton Lakes	Full-service
WGLS-FM	89.7 FM	Glassboro	Rowan University	College radio
WGYM	1580 AM	Hammonton	Domestic Church Media Foundation	Religious
WHCY	106.3 FM	Blairstown	iHM Licenses, LLC	Country
WHTG	1410 AM	Eatontown	Press Communications, LLC	Oldies
WHTZ	100.3 FM	Newark	iHM Licenses, LLC	Top 40 (CHR)
WHWH	1350 AM	Princeton	Multicultural Radio Broadcasting Licensee, LLC	Spanish
WIBG-FM	94.3 FM	Avalon	WIBG LLC	Classic hits
WIFI	1460 AM	Florence	Ritmo Broadcasting, LLC	Spanish CHR
WJLK	1160 AM	Lakewood Township	Townsquare License, LLC	Oldies
WJLK-FM	94.3 FM	Asbury Park	Townsquare License, LLC	Hot adult contemporary
WJPG	88.1 FM	Cape May Court House	Maranatha Ministries	Contemporary Christian
WJPH	89.9 FM	Woodbine	Maranatha Ministries	Simulcast of WJPG
WJRZ-FM	100.1 FM	Manahawkin	Beasley Media Group, LLC	Classic hits
WJSV	90.5 FM	Morristown	Morris School District	Freeform/Educational
WJUI-LP	104.7 FM	Ramtown	American Center for Civil Justice, Inc.	Jewish Religious
WKMB	1070 AM	Stirling	World Harvest Communications, Inc	Gospel
WKMK	106.3 FM	Eatontown	Press Communications, LLC	Country
WKNJ-FM	90.3 FM	Union Township	Kean University	Freeform
WKOE	106.3 FM	North Cape May	Coastal Broadcasting Systems, Inc.	Country
WKVP	106.9 FM	Camden	Educational Media Foundation	Christian adult contemporary (K-Love)
WKXW	101.5 FM	Trenton	Townsquare License, LLC	News/Talk; Classic hits
WLFR	91.7 FM	Pomona	Stockton University	Freeform
WLNJ	91.7 FM	Lakehurst	WYRS Broadcasting	Religious
WLOM	90.5 FM	Somers Point	Hope Christian Church of Marlton, Inc.	Christian
WLRB	102.7 FM	Ocean City	Educational Media Foundation	Christian adult contemporary (K-Love)
WMCX	88.9 FM	West Long Branch	Monmouth University	Alternative rock
WMDI-LP	107.9 FM	Lakewood	American Institute for Jewish Education (AIJE)	Jewish Religious
WMGM	103.7 FM	Atlantic City	Longport Media	Active rock
WMGQ	98.3 FM	New Brunswick	Beasley Media Group, LLC	Adult contemporary
WMID	1340 AM	Atlantic City	The Jersey Giant WMID, LLC	Oldies
WMRH-LP	101.7 FM	Linwood	Mainland Regional High School	Variety
WMSC	90.3 FM	Upper Montclair	Montclair State University	Freeform
WMTR	1250 AM	Morristown	Beasley Media Group, LLC	Oldies
WMVB	1440 AM	Millville	Martin A. Muniz	Regional Mexican
WNEQ	90.3 FM	Taylortown	Redeemer Broadcasting, Inc.	Religious
WNJB-FM	89.3 FM	Bridgeton	The Bridge of Hope, Inc.	Christian adult contemporary (Simulcast of WKNZ)
WNJC	1360 AM	Washington Township	Forsythe Broadcasting	Brokered Time
WNJE	920 AM	Trenton	Townsquare License, LLC	Regional Mexican
WNJH	105.5 FM	Cape May Court House	The Bridge of Hope, Inc.	Christian adult contemporary
WNJI-LP	95.9 FM	Kearney	Gospel Light Prayer Church Inc	Religious
WNJM	89.9 FM	Manahawkin	WHYY, Inc.	NPR (Simulcast of WHYY-FM)
WNJN-FM	89.7 FM	Atlantic City	WHYY, Inc.	NPR (Simulcast of WHYY-FM)
WNJO	90.3 FM	Toms River	New York Public Radio	NPR
WNJP	88.5 FM	Sussex	New York Public Radio	NPR
WNJT-FM	88.1 FM	Trenton	New York Public Radio	NPR
WNJY	89.3 FM	Netcong	New York Public Radio	NPR
WNJZ	90.3 FM	Cape May Court House	WHYY, Inc.	NPR (Simulcast of WHYY-FM)
WNNJ	103.7 FM	Newton	iHM Licenses, LLC	Classic rock
WXBK	94.7 FM	Newark	Audacy License, LLC	Classic hip hop
WNSW	1430 AM	Newark	Relevant Radio, Inc.	Catholic
WNYM	970 AM	Hackensack	Salem Media of New York, LLC	Conservative talk
WOBM	1310 AM	Asbury Park	Townsquare License, LLC	Oldies
WOBM-FM	92.7 FM	Toms River	Townsquare License, LLC	Adult contemporary
WOCQ	1510 AM	Salem	FM Radio Licenses, LLC	Spanish CHR
WOLD-LP	107.9 FM	Woodbridge	SRN Communications, Inc.	Classic hits
WOND	1400 AM	Pleasantville	Longport Media	News/Talk
WPAT	930 AM	Paterson	Multicultural Radio Broadcasting Licensee, LLC	Ethnic
WPAT-FM	93.1 FM	Paterson	WPAT Licensing, Inc.	Spanish Tropical
WPEN	97.5 FM	Burlington	Beasley Media Group, LLC	Sports (ESPN/FSR)
WPGG	1450 AM	Atlantic City	Townsquare License, LLC	Talk
WPOV-LP	107.7 FM	Vineland	Advantage Ministries, Inc	Religious Teaching
WPPZ-FM	107.9 FM	Pennsauken	Radio One Licenses, LLC	Urban oldies
WPRB	103.3 FM	Princeton	Princeton Broadcasting Service, Inc.	Variety
WPSC-FM	88.7 FM	Wayne	William Paterson College of N.J.	Freeform
WPST	94.5 FM	Trenton	Townsquare License, LLC	Top 40 (CHR)
WPUR	107.3 FM	Atlantic City	Townsquare License, LLC	Country
WQXR-FM	105.9 FM	Newark	New York Public Radio	Classical
WRAT	95.9 FM	Point Pleasant	Beasley Media Group, LLC	Mainstream rock
WRDR	89.7 FM	Freehold Township	Bridgelight LLC	Religious
WRML-LP	107.9 FM	Mays Landing	Atlantic Cape Community College	Variety
WRNJ	1510 AM	Hackettstown	WRNJ Radio Inc.	Adult contemporary
WRPR	90.3 FM	Mahwah	Ramapo College of New Jersey	Freeform
WRRC	107.7 FM	Lawrenceville	Board of Trustees of Rider College	Freeform
WRSK-LP	97.5 FM	Newton	Sussex County Community College	Oldies
WRSU-FM	88.7 FM	New Brunswick	Board of Governors of Rutgers University	College/Freeform
WRTQ	91.3 FM	Ocean City	Temple University of the Commonwealth System of Higher Education	Classical/Jazz (Simulcast of WRTI)
WRWL-LP	107.7 FM	Galloway	Word of Life Christian Fellowship	Religious
WSJO	104.9 FM	Egg Harbor City	Townsquare License, LLC	Top 40 (CHR)
WSMJ	91.9 FM	North Wildwood	Domestic Church Media Foundation	Religious
WSNJ	1240 AM	Bridgeton	SNJ Today, LLC	Adult contemporary
WSNR	620 AM	Jersey City	Davidzon Radio, Inc.	Brokered time
WSOU	89.5 FM	South Orange	Seton Hall University	Active rock
WSRX-LP	107.9 FM	Vernon	Skylands Radio Cooperative	Variety
WSUS	102.3 FM	Franklin	iHM Licenses, LLC	Adult contemporary
WTHA	88.1 FM	Berlin	Bux-Mont Educational Radio Association	Big band/Doo wop/Oldies (Simulcast of WRDV)
WTHJ	106.5 FM	Bass River Township	Press Communications, LLC	Country (simulcast of WKMK)
WTKU-FM	98.3 FM	Petersburg	Longport Media	Classic hits
WTMR	800 AM	Camden	Beasley Media Group, LLC	Religious
WTOC	1360 AM	Newton	Centro Biblico of NJ, Inc.	Spanish religious
WTSR	91.3 FM	Trenton	The College of New Jersey	Freeform
WTTH	96.1 FM	Margate City	iHM Licenses, LLC	Urban adult contemporary
WTTM	1680 AM	Lindenwold	Multicultural Radio Broadcasting Licensee, LLC	World Ethnic
WVBH	88.3 FM	Beach Haven West	Priority Radio	Urban gospel
WVBV	90.5 FM	Medford Lakes	Hope Christian Church of Marlton, Inc.	Religious
WVLT	1270 AM	Vineland	Clear Communications	Classic hits
WVLT-FM	92.1 FM	Vineland	Clear Communications, Inc.	Classic hits
WVNJ	1160 AM	Oakland	Relevant Radio, Inc.	Catholic
WVPH	90.3 FM	Piscataway	Piscataway Board Of Education	Freeform
WWAC	1020 AM	Ocean City	Enrico S. Brancadora	Country
WWCJ	89.1 FM	Cape May	Mercer County Community College	Simulcast of WWFM
WWFM	89.1 FM	Trenton	Mercer County Community College	Classical
WWFP	90.5 FM	Brigantine	Hope Christian Church of Marlton, Inc.	Religious
WWJZ	640 AM	Mount Holly	Relevant Radio, Inc.	Catholic
WWNJ	91.1 FM	Toms River	Mercer County Community College	Simulcast of WWFM
WWPH	107.9 FM	Princeton Junction	West Windsor-Plainsboro Regional School District	Freeform
WWRU	1660 AM	Jersey City	Multicultural Radio Broadcasting Licensee, LLC	Korean
WWTR	1170 AM	Bridgewater	EBC Music, Inc.	South Asian
WWYY	107.1 FM	Belvidere	Radio License Holding CBC, LLC	Country
WWZY	107.1 FM	Long Branch	Press Communications LLC	Classic hits
WXGN-LP	92.7 FM	Ocean City	Joy Broadcasting, Inc.	Christian
WXMC	1310 AM	Parsippany-Troy Hills	Cantico Nuevo Ministry, Inc.	Hindi
WXPJ	91.9 FM	Hackettstown	The Trustees of the University of Pennsylvania	Simulcast of WXPN
WXRM-LP	101.1 FM	Cape May Court House	South Jersey Christian Academy	Silent
WYGG	88.1 FM	Asbury Park	Minority Business & Housing Development, Inc.	Haitian Religious
WYNE-LP	95.9 FM	Wayne	Preakness Valley United Reformed Church	Religious Teaching
WYPA	89.5 FM	Cherry Hill	Educational Media Foundation	Contemporary worship (Air1)
WYRS	90.7 FM	Manahawkin	WYRS Broadcasting	Christian
WZBL	88.1 FM	Barnegat Light	Hope Christian Church of Marlton, Inc.	Religious
WZBZ	99.3 FM	Pleasantville	iHM Licenses, LLC	Rhythmic contemporary
WZXL	100.7 FM	Wildwood	iHM Licenses, LLC	Mainstream rock
WZYE-LP	95.9 FM	Maplewood	Caribbean Sports International, Inc.	Ethnic

== Defunct ==
- KE2XCC
- W2XMN
- WBGD
- WDY
- WFDS
- WFMN
- WHPH
- WIMG
- WJDM
- WJJZ
- WJY (New Jersey)
- WLOM
- WMNJ
- WPAT-FM (1949–1951)
- WSRR
- WUPC-LP
- WWDX
- WZFI-LP
- WCPR (Hoboken, New Jersey - Stevens Institute of Technology)
