= WOBM =

WOBM can refer to:

- WOBM (AM), a radio station (1310 AM) licensed to Asbury Park, New Jersey, United States
- WOBM-FM, a radio station (92.7 FM) licensed to Toms River, New Jersey, United States
- WJLK (AM), a radio station (1160 AM) licensed to Lakewood Township, New Jersey, United States, which held the call sign WOBM from 1981 to 2023
