= WJLK =

WJLK can refer to:

- WJLK (AM), a radio station (1160 AM) licensed to Lakewood Township, New Jersey, United States
- WJLK-FM, a radio station (94.3 FM) licensed to Asbury Park, New Jersey
- WOBM (AM), a radio station (1310 AM) licensed to Asbury Park, New Jersey, which held the call sign WJLK from 1950 to 1996
