= WBUD =

WBUD may refer to:

- WBUD-LD, a low-power television station (channel 30, virtual 26) licensed to serve Blairsville, Georgia
- WOBM (AM), a radio station (1310 AM) licensed to Asbury Park, New Jersey, which held the call sign WBUD from September 2008 to June 2009
- WFJS (AM), a radio station (1260 AM) licensed to Trenton, New Jersey, which held the call sign WBUD until May 1980 and from September 1981 to September 2008
- WKXW, a radio station (101.5 FM) licensed to Trenton, New Jersey, which held the call sign WBUD-FM from 1962 to 1967
