= WSJO =

- Egg Harbor City, New Jersey; United States
- Broadcast area: South Jersey
- Frequency: 104.9 MHz (HD Radio)
- Branding: SoJO 104.9

Programming
- Format: Hot adult contemporary
- Subchannels: HD3: Oldies "Beach Radio"; HD4: Simulcast of WWFP
- Affiliations: Compass Media Networks

Ownership
- Owner: Townsquare Media; (Townsquare License, LLC)
- Sister stations: WENJ; WFPG; WPGG; WPUR

History
- First air date: 1971
- Former call signs: WRDR (1971–1999); WEMG (1999); WEMG-FM (1999–2003); WOJZ (2003–2004)
- Call sign meaning: We're South Jersey's Own

Technical information
- Licensing authority: FCC
- Facility ID: 57357
- Class: B1
- ERP: 10,000 watts
- HAAT: 155 meters (509 ft)
- Transmitter coordinates: 39°32′49.4″N 74°38′17.5″W
- Translator: See tables below

Links
- Public license information: Public file; LMS
- Webcast: Listen live; HD3: Listen live
- Website: www.sojo1049.com; HD3: mybeachradio.com

WSJO (104.9 FM, "SoJO 104.9") is a commercial radio station licensed to serve Egg Harbor City, New Jersey. The station is owned by Townsquare Media, through licensee Townsquare License, LLC, and broadcasts a hot adult contemporary format.

WSJO broadcasts to the Atlantic City and Vineland areas, with fringe coverage across the rest of South Jersey, including many Philadelphia suburbs. When the station first hit the air in 2004, its programming originated from studios shared with New Jersey 101.5 in Ewing Township, New Jersey, outside its primary coverage area. Today, the station is programmed from Townsquare's Atlantic City/Vineland area cluster in Northfield, New Jersey. That cluster includes WFPG, Atlantic City (Lite Rock 96.9), WENJ, Millvile (97.3 ESPN), WPUR, Atlantic City (Cat Country 107.3) and WPGG, Atlantic City (WPG Talk Radio 95.5).

== History ==
The FM station began operations in 1971 as WRDR on 104.9 FM. The city of license was, and still is Egg Harbor City. It, along with its AM simulcast counterpart, WRDI, was known as "WRD Radio", with studios on the White Horse Pike in Hammonton, the city of license for WRDI. Broadcasts consisted of an middle of the road (MOR) music format, along with high school sports and live area events, like remotes from Hammonton's annual Our Lady of Mount Carmel Festival and the Red, White and Blueberry Festival. The stations were owned by Delaware Valley radio veteran Jim Rodio (d/b/a Rodio Radio). In 1980, Rodio sold the AM station and WRDR went it alone from new studios on Philadelphia Avenue in Egg Harbor City, using a syndicated "live assist" standards/MOR format called "Unforgettable" from Toby Arnold and Associates. Now known as "Unforgettable FM 105 WRDR", the format was augmented by music from a record library. One of the stations biggest features was Rodio's Saturday evening "Bandstand" program highlighting the Big Band years. The station had also aired Philadelphia Phillies baseball and Philadelphia Flyers hockey.

In 1997, Rodio sold WRDR to New Jersey Broadcasting, who "updated" the format by hiring former WIP music director Bob Russo as program director. Russo was instrumental in starting WIP on the road to adult contemporary from MOR in the 1970s, and WRDR adopted his early-1970s music mix that straddled the two formats, augmented by some later compatible music. The station sounded very much like WIP had in the 1970s.

On June 14, 1999, the station was sold again and became WEMG-FM with a Spanish-language contemporary hit radio format from Mega Broadcasting. The station was simulcast with Mega's "Mega 1310 AM" in Camden, and both stations adopted the "Mega 104.9" moniker.

After another sale in 2003, this time to Nassau Broadcasting, the station began simulcasting Trenton sister station WPST (97.5 FM), before airing country music for much of the summer. It has been rumored, but never confirmed, that a prior agreement between Millennium Radio, then-owners of WPUR in Atlantic City, and Nassau precluded either company airing a competitive format in markets where they both owned stations. Nassau then switched 104.9 FM to smooth jazz as WOJZ in late August. After yet another sale, to competitor Millennium in 2004, the call sign was changed to WSJO and the station became hot adult contemporary station "SoJo 104.9". In 2011, WSJO, along with the rest of the Millennium-Atlantic City cluster, was sold to Townsquare Media, the current owner.

In November 2015, WSJO added the programming of WPGG on HD2, and Beach Radio which is used on former WOBM on HD3. In May 2016, Hope Christian Church of Marlton's Hope FM went on HD4. Sometime in early 2023, WSJO removed the HD2 channel. In 2023, WSJO shifted to mainstream CHR.

== Translators ==
The following translator simulcasts the programming of WSJO-HD3:

Call sign	Frequency	City of license	FID	ERP (W)	HAAT	Class	Transmitter coordinates	FCC info	Notes
W265CS	100.9 FM	Manahawkin, New Jersey	138241	46	103 m (338 ft)	D	39°42′56.9″N 74°17′29.5″W	LMS	Simulcasts HD3
