= WXGN =

WXGN may refer to:

- WXGN-LP, a low-power radio station (92.7 FM) licensed to serve Ocean City, New Jersey, United States
- WLOM (FM), a radio station (90.5 FM) licensed to serve Somers Point, New Jersey, which held the call sign WXGN from 1996 to 2020
