= WLOM =

WLOM may refer to:

- WLOM (FM), a radio station (90.5 FM) licensed to serve Somers Point, New Jersey, United States
- WXGN-LP, a low-power radio station (92.7 FM) licensed to serve Ocean City, New Jersey, which held the call sign WLOM-LP from 2003 to 2020
