= WGYM =

- Hammonton, New Jersey; United States
- Broadcast area: Atlantic County; Camden County
- Frequency: 1580 kHz

Programming
- Format: Catholic radio
- Affiliations: EWTN Radio

Ownership
- Owner: Domestic Church Media Foundation

History
- First air date: May 11, 1961 (as WNJH)
- Former call signs: WNJH (1961–1971); WRDI (1971–1981); WTYO (1981–1991); WONZ (1991–2001)
- Call sign meaning: "Gymnasium" (from former sports talk format)

Technical information
- Licensing authority: FCC
- Facility ID: 61110
- Class: D
- Power: 1,000 watts day; 6 watts night
- Transmitter coordinates: 39°37′33.42″N 74°47′42.59″W

Links
- Public license information: Public file; LMS
- Webcast: Listen live
- Website: www.domesticchurchmedia.org

WGYM (1580 kHz) is a non-commercial AM radio station broadcasting a religious format aimed at Catholic listeners. The station is licensed to Hammonton, New Jersey, and serves parts of Atlantic County and Camden County. The station is owned by the Domestic Church Media Foundation, which also owns three other stations, also in New Jersey: WFJS in Trenton, WFJS-FM in Freehold, and WSMJ in North Wildwood. All four broadcast Catholic programming, mostly supplied by the EWTN Radio Network.

WGYM operates at 1,000 watts by day from a transmitter located off Grand Street South. Because AM 1580 is a clear channel frequency reserved for Canada, WGYM must reduce power to 6 watts at night, when AM radio waves travel farther.

== History ==
The station went on the air as WNJH on May 11, 1961. It was originally owned by the Harrell Trucking Company of Baltimore. In 1967 the station was purchased by Hammonton resident and local radio veteran Jim Rodio. By late 1971 the call sign had been changed to WRDI. Soon after Rodio launched FM station 104.9 WRDR (today WSJO), which was simulcast with the AM station at times. Rodio sold the AM station and the call letters were changed to WTYO on December 31, 1981. WTYO played adult contemporary music and was affiliated with NBC Radio. The station was eventually sold to The Green Group, based in Linwood, New Jersey. On March 25, 1991, the call letters were changed to WONZ and the station began to simulcast Pleasantville-licensed WOND. On March 22, 2001, the station assumed the WGYM call sign that had been used by The Green Group's station on 1490 AM in Pleasantville and began running the sports radio programming from ESPN Radio that had been airing on 1490. On February 22, 2002, the station dropped the ESPN programming and resumed simulcasting WOND.

In the 2000s The Green Group's southern New Jersey stations were sold to Access.1 Communications Corporation. A subsequent resale of the radio group did not include WGYM; however, the owners of the ex-Green stations continued to provide programming to the Hammonton station.

In 2010, the station switched to a simulcast of 1490, now renamed WBSS. As of August 12, 2011, WGYM was once again simulcasting WOND. On March 19, 2014, WGYM split from its simulcast with WOND and switched to a Spanish-language format.

In January 2016, WGYM switched to a Catholic-based religious format when it was acquired by the Domestic Church Media Foundation.
