= WFNE =

WFNE may refer to:

- WFNE-LP, a low-power radio station (103.5 FM) licensed to serve Wake Forest, North Carolina, United States
- WJSE, a radio station (106.3 FM) licensed to serve North Cape May, New Jersey, United States, which held the call sign WFNE from 2010 to 2012
