= WPAT =

WPAT may refer to:

- WPAT (AM), a radio station (930 AM) licensed to Paterson, New Jersey, United States
- WPAT-FM, a radio station (93.1 FM) licensed to Paterson, New Jersey, United States
- the ICAO airport code for Atauro Airport on Atauro Island, Dili, East Timor
