= WSJQ =

WSJQ may refer to:

- WSJQ (FM), a radio station (91.5 FM) licensed to serve Pascoag, Rhode Island, United States
- WJSE, a radio station (106.3 FM) licensed to serve North Cape May, New Jersey, United States, which held the call sign WSJQ from 2005 to 2008
