= WTSR =

Radio station at The College of New Jersey

- Trenton, New Jersey; United States
- Broadcast area: Mercer County, New Jersey; Bucks County, Pennsylvania
- Frequency: 91.3 MHz

Programming
- Format: College radio
- Affiliations: Pacifica Radio Network

Ownership
- Owner: The College of New Jersey; (The College of NJ Radio System)

History
- First air date: October 26, 1966
- Former frequencies: 89.7 MHz (1966–1972)
- Call sign meaning: "Trenton State Radio"

Technical information
- Licensing authority: FCC
- Facility ID: 67625
- Class: A
- ERP: 1,500 watts
- HAAT: 11 meters (36 ft)
- Transmitter coordinates: 40.2715°N 74.7815°W

Links
- Public license information: Public file; LMS
- Website: wtsr.org

WTSR (91.3 FM) is a student-run non-commercial radio station broadcasting from The College of New Jersey (formerly Trenton State College), servicing Mercer County and Bucks County, Pennsylvania. The station's call letters originally reflected the college's former name: "Trenton State Radio".

== History ==
In June 1966, the Federal Communications Commission (FCC) granted the college permission to use 89.7 FM at a power of 10 watts under the callsign WTSR. WTSR first went on the air on October 26, 1966, from two studios in Armstrong Hall following a ceremony from then-new college president Dr. Virgil W. Gillenwater. In March 1968 the radio station moved from Armstrong into Kendall Hall.

On November 1, 1974, following months of testing, WTSR changed frequency to 91.3 FM when the station was granted an increase in power by the FCC to broadcast at 1,500 watts. This upgrade provided the station with a 30-mile broadcast radius and the capability to reach a potential audience of 750,000 to 800,000 listeners. Following a stint to The Brower Student Center, WTSR moved into brand new facilities inside Kendall Hall at the beginning of the 1993–94 academic year.

In 2011 the Trenton Thunder, then the Double A affiliate of the New York Yankees, announced WTSR as the new flagship station of the Trenton Thunder Radio Network. The agreement saw WTSR broadcast all Thunder Eastern League regular season games and playoff games. In 2017, the Thunder announced a new broadcast deal with WNJE.

== WTSR Underground ==
Once per semester, WTSR collaborates with Lions Television (LTV) to bring underground alternative artists to The College of New Jersey. Each band performs a live set, which is recorded and later uploaded to the WTSR Underground YouTube channel. Artists are also interviewed by WTSR's News Staff. Turnover, Citizen, and Tiny Moving Parts have all performed at Underground.

== Management ==
WTSR is completely student-run consisting of two boards: the executive board (e-board) and the board of directors. The e-board is made up of the station manager, operations manager, and the program manager. The board of directors includes the rest of the board, for a total of 11 student members who operate the station along with the general manager.

== Awards ==
Intercollegiate Broadcasting System Awards
Year	Award	Entry	Awardee(s)	Result
2022	Best Station Blog	91.3FM Blog	Zach Rich, Haley Wright	Finalist
2022	Best Sports Update	Sports Talk!	Jay Katz	Finalist
2022	Best News Interview	Interview with Dr. Gary Chapman	Nancy Bowne	Finalist
2022	Best College/University Radio Station (under 10,000 students)	91.3FM WTSR	WTSR Executive Board	Finalist
2022	Best Community Volunteer Program/Personality	Get Funked Up	Dennis Bereznyak "D-Menace"	Finalist
2023	Best Talk Program	Slumber Party	Cassie Malnick, Bella Trucco	Winner
2024	Best Use of Video in Radio Studio	WTSR Underground	Emily Dougherty, DJ Landau, Robert Andersen, Annalise Kelly, Catherine Burns, Delaney Smith, Maddy Breeze, Christopher Ortiz, Sam Herman	Finalist
2024	Best Liner/Sweeper	The Pond Splash Zone	Zach Rice, Jake Brancato	Finalist
2024	Best Program Director, Radio	91.3FM WTSR	Madeline Breeze	Finalist
2025	Best Community Volunteer Program	Transmission Control	Thomas Kelley	Winner
2025	Best Political News	Live Election Coverage 11/7/24	Delaney Smith, Sarah Neil, Kevin Potucek, Skye Frawley & Jenna Rittman	Finalist
2025	Best Program Director, Radio	91.3FM WTSR	Delaney Smith	Finalist
2025	Best Production Director, Radio	The College of New Jersey	Samuel Herman	Winner
2025	Best Music Director, Radio	91.3FM WTSR	Addie DiPietro	Finalist
2025	Best Sports Director, Radio	91.3.FM WTSR	Matthew Post	Finalist
2025	Best Business Director, Radio	91.3FM WTSR	Daniel Landau	Finalist

== See also ==
- List of college radio stations in the United States
- List of radio stations in New Jersey
