= Frank Marth =

American actor (1922–2014)

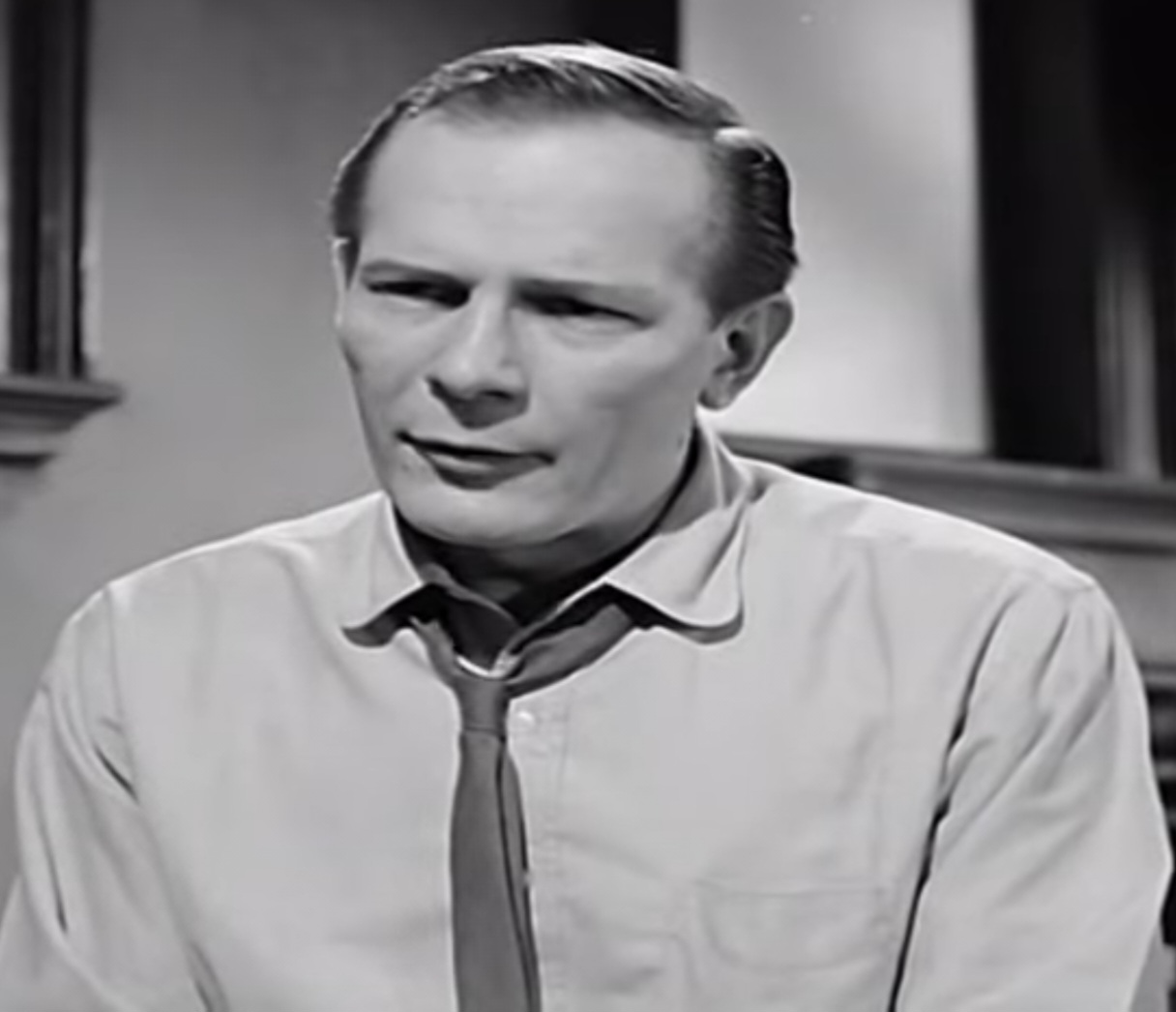
- Marth in the Beverly Garland crime drama, Decoy (1958)
- Born: July 29, 1922; New York City, U.S.
- Died: January 12, 2014 (aged 91); Rancho Mirage, California, U.S.
- Occupation: Actor
- Years active: 1949–1987
- Spouse: Hope Holiday (m. 1967)

Frank Marth (July 29, 1922 – January 12, 2014) was an American film and television actor. He may be best known as a cast-member of Cavalcade of Stars (1949; 1950–1957), especially segments of The Honeymooners, which later became a television series (1955–56).

== Early years ==
Marth was born in the Washington Heights neighborhood of Manhattan to Mr. And Mrs. Frank Marth, Sr. He attended public schools graduating from Commerce High School. He initially worked in building construction, but after World War II he attended the Feagin School of Dramatic Art with plans to work in radio.

== Career ==
Early in his career, Marth worked in radio, including being announcer, commentator, and disc jockey on WOV in New York City and WWDX-FM and WPAT in New Jersey.

On stage, Marth acted in productions of local and regional theaters, including the Greenwood Playhouse in Maine and the Willimantic Playhouse in Connecticut.

Marth's big screen credits included roles in films such as Madame X (1966), Madigan (1968), Pendulum (1969), The Lost Man (1969), Marooned (1969) and Telefon (1977).

On television, Marth appeared in two episodes of Perry Mason, five episodes of The Big Valley, one episode of The Wild Wild West and Mannix, five episodes of Hogan's Heroes, three episodes of Barnaby Jones, two episodes of Mission: Impossible, and episodes of Hawaii Five-O, The Fugitive, Cannon, The Invaders, Gunsmoke,The F.B.I., The Streets of San Francisco, The Six Million Dollar Man, The New Adventures of Wonder Woman, Dallas and M*A*S*H. In 1970 Marth appeared as Rawlings in the western TV series The Virginian in the episode titled "The Gift". In 1976, he appeared in an episode of Sara and played the commanding officer of Ben Murphy's character in the TV series version of The Dirty Dozen. He also played Ben Fraser, Jr. in the NBC drama From These Roots (1958-1961) and was a regular on Jackie Gleason and His American Scene Magazine and The Jackie Gleason Show.

Tall and fair-haired, Marth, often in tandem with the short, dark-haired George O. Petrie, played various recurring and one-time roles on The Honeymooners; e.g., as one of the brutal hoods who hold the Kramdens and Ed Norton hostage after Ralph witnesses a bank robbery; as Harvey Walstatter, who hires Alice Kramden to babysit his son, Harvey, Jr.; and as the inquiring news photographer who lands Ralph Kramden in hot water after he quotes Kramden declaring that he is "head of the household".

== Death ==
Marth died of congestive heart failure and Alzheimer's disease on January 12, 2014, in Rancho Mirage, California, aged 91.

== Filmography (partial) ==
Year	Title	Role	Notes
1956	Fright	George Morley	
1961	Breakfast at Tiffany's	Party Guest	Uncredited
1963	Love with the Proper Stranger	Carlos	Uncredited
1966	Madame X	Det. Combs	
1968	Madigan	Lt. James Price	
1969	Pendulum	Lt. Smithson	
1969	The Lost Man	Warren	
1969	Marooned	Air Force Systems Director	
1977	Telefon	Harley Sandburg	
1994	Loving Deadly	John	(final film role)

== Television (partial) ==
Year	Title	Role	Notes
1955–1957	The Honeymooners		
1964, 1966	Combat!	German Captain / Lt. Vogler	Episodes: "Operation Fly Trap" and "Run, Sheep, Run"
1964	My Favorite Martian	Capt. Edward Prescott	Episode: "The Great Brain Robbery"
1969	Bonanza	Mr. Burnham	Episode: "The Silence at Stillwater"
1965–1970	Hogan's Heroes	Various characters	5 episodes
1969-1970	Mannix	Lieutenant Burdette	Episode 14, Season 3, "Medal for a Hero"
1970	The Virginian	Emmett Rawlings	Episode: "The Gift"
1974–1976	Cannon	Captain Royce / Eliott Strickland	Episodes: "Kelly's Song" and "Point After Death"
1975	M*A*S*H	Colonel Griswald	Episode: "Hey Doc"
1977	Wonder Woman	Tall Man	Episode: "Knockout"
1979	Battlestar Galactica	Josh Moreland	Episode: "Greetings from Earth"
1985	The A-Team	Jim Sullivan	Episode: "Road Games"
