= WCZT =

- Villas, New Jersey; United States
- Broadcast area: Cape May County, New Jersey; Coastal Delaware
- Frequency: 98.7 MHz
- Branding: 98.7 the Coast

Programming
- Format: Hot adult contemporary
- Affiliations: ABC News Radio

Ownership
- Owner: Robert Maschio; (Coastal Broadcasting Systems, Inc.)
- Sister stations: WJSE

History
- First air date: October 19, 1988; 37 years ago
- Former call signs: WVIL (1988–1990); WLQE (1990–1992); WFNN (1992–1998); WWZK (1998)

Technical information
- Licensing authority: FCC
- Facility ID: 39914
- Class: A
- ERP: 6,000 watts
- HAAT: 89.5 meters (294 ft)
- Transmitter coordinates: 38°59′45.00″N 74°50′19.00″W

Links
- Public license information: Public file; LMS
- Website: 987thecoast.com

WCZT (98.7 FM) is a radio station broadcasting a hot adult contemporary format. Licensed to Villas, New Jersey, United States, the station's signal covers the southern New Jersey shore from Beach Haven to Cape May, as well as coastal Delaware. The station is currently owned by Robert Maschio and Scott Wahl, through licensee Coastal Broadcasting Systems, Inc. and features programming from ABC News Radio.

== History ==
The station was first granted the WVIL call sign on November 8, 1988. Calls were then changed to WLQE on February 1, 1990 and signed on soon afterwards with a country format as "Lucky 99."

On March 2, 1992, calls were changed to WFNN and the format shifted over to Hot AC (via satellite) as "Fun 98.7."

On January 19, 1998, the format evolved into classic rock and on March 1, 1998, changed calls to WWZK.

In February 2001, a switch occurred between 98.7 and 94.3 in Avalon with 94.3's calls and format moving to 98.7. The WCZT calls became effective on March 2, 2001.

In January 2011, WCZT segued to a Hot Adult Contemporary format.

The Coast plays Christmas music from late November through Christmas Day.

During the weekends, 98.7 The Coast focuses on hits from the 90's while most other stations focus on the 80's.
