= Atlantic Cape Community College =

Public college in Atlantic and Cape May Counties, New Jersey, USA

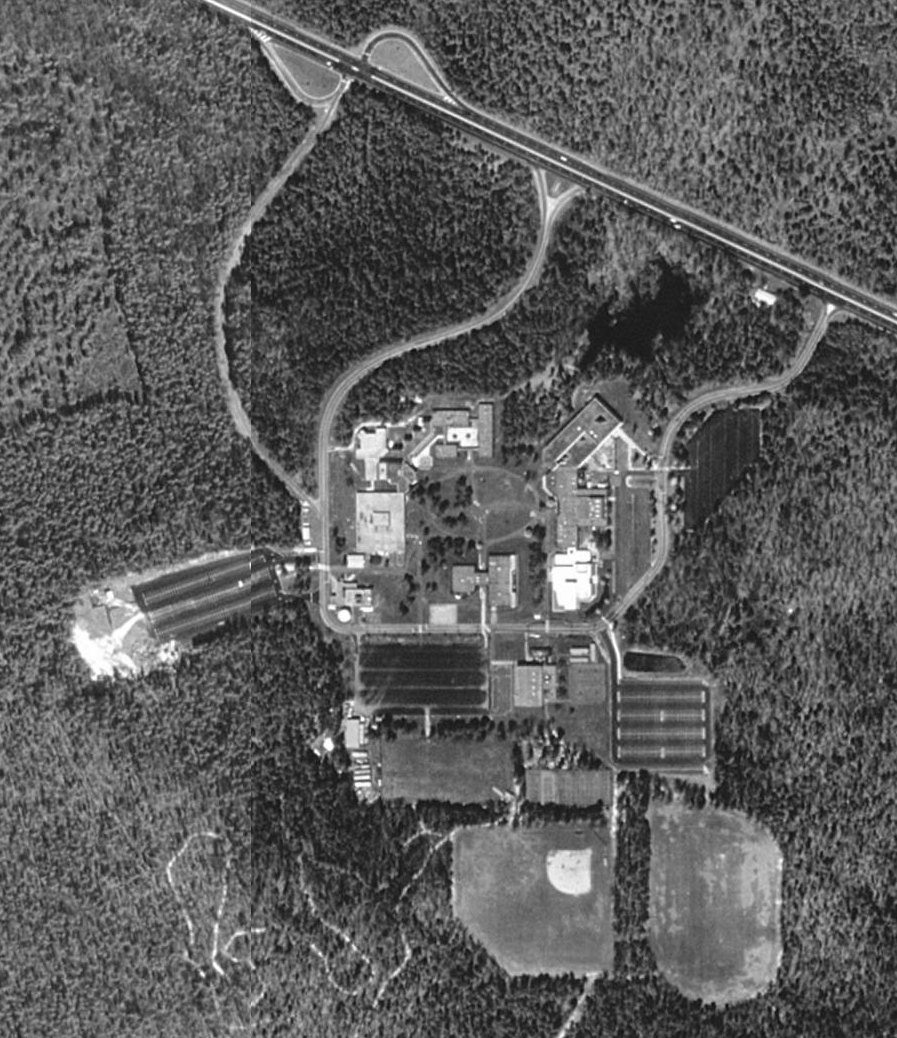
- Overhead view of the Mays Landing campus
- Type: Public community college
- Established: 1964
- Affiliations: Sea-grant
- President: Barbara L. Gaba
- Students: 6,500
- Location: Mays Landing, Atlantic City, Cape May Court House, New Jersey, United States; 39.4614°N 74.6808°W - Mays Landing Campus; 39.1043°N 74.8240°W - Cape May County Campus
- Campus: 541 acres (2.19 km^{2})
- Nickname: Buccaneers
- Website: atlantic.edu

Atlantic Cape Community College is a public community college in Atlantic County and Cape May County in New Jersey. Atlantic Cape enrolls more than 6,000 students. Its main campuses are in the Mays Landing section of Hamilton Township in Atlantic County, Atlantic City, and Cape May Court House.

Situated on 541 acres (2.19 km^{2}) in the New Jersey Pine Barrens, Atlantic Cape's Mays Landing Campus is 15 miles (24 km) west of Atlantic City's boardwalk, 45 miles (72 km) from Philadelphia, Pennsylvania, and 115 miles (185 km) from New York City. The college offers more than 40 transfer and career degree programs as well as continuing education professional development and training services. It awards Associate in Arts, Associate in Science and Associate in Applied Science degrees. The college operates nationally recognized casino career and culinary arts programs. The college operates an extension center in Atlantic City and a full-service location in Cape May County.

== History ==
In 1936, there were plans to open junior colleges – now known as community colleges – in Atlantic City, Camden, and Trenton, New Jersey, but this did not come to fruition due to lack of state funding. In the 1950s during the Post–World War II baby boom, there was a movement in the United States to increase the number of community colleges. In 1962, the New Jersey Legislature authorized the establishment and committed to funding such institutions in the state, after efforts of local freeholders, county superintendents, and citizen groups. The Citizens Centennial Committee on Adult Education for Atlantic City pursued a college for the area. After a study by local freeholders and educators, the New Jersey Department of Education approved the establishment of an Atlantic County community college in December 1963. On April 14, 1964, Atlantic Community College was officially organized, only the second community college in the state at the time.

In September 1966, the college opened to students in a facility rented from Atlantic City High School. By 1967, there were over 1,000 enrolled students. In February 1968, the college was moved to the Mays Landing campus. By 1969, the number of enrolled students exceeded 2,000. In 1971, Atlantic Community College was first accredited by the Commission on Higher Education of the Middle States Association of Colleges and Schools, and it was most recently re-accredited in 2013. As of June 1974, the state of New Jersey had spent $1,964,933 on the college, and an additional $1,143,991 was spent using federal funds authorized by the Higher Education Act of 1965. On July 1, 1977, Atlantic Community College established the Casino Career Institute to support the development of casinos in Atlantic City. Opening in 1978 in Atlantic City, it was the first gaming school in the United States affiliated with a college. Officials from Atlantic County bought a former Atlantic City Electric building in Atlantic City in Spring 1982. After a $4 million expansion project, the building opened, housing the Casino Career Institute.

There was originally no community college in Cape May County, due to insufficient population; as of 1973, the New Jersey Department of Higher Education had a policy that required a county population base of at least 125,000 to be economically sustainable. In 1973, Atlantic Community College began offering night classes in Cape May Court House at Middle Township High School. Due to increased demand, the college opened the Cape May County Extension Center in 1980, where it accounted for 21% of the total enrollment. The facility later moved to a strip mall in Rio Grande. For 20 years, Cape May County officials subsidized the cost for students to attend Atlantic Community College or Cumberland County College, estimated at $2 million per year. By the 1990s, Cape May County was the last in the state without a community college.

In 1993, supporters of a local college sent a formal request to the New Jersey State Department of Higher Education. Freeholder candidate and future state senator Jeff Van Drew campaigned on a county college in 1994. In 1995, the state denied a request for an independent college in Cape May, instead urging the county to partner with a neighboring county college, which would allow for immediate accreditation. Cape May County requested to join Atlantic Community College in February 1997, which was approved on January 1, 1999. One month later, the institute's Board of Trustees approved changing the name to Atlantic Cape Community College. After delays and permit acquisition, the Cape May County campus opened to a ribbon-cutting ceremony on August 24, 2005; classes began 13 days later.

In 2000, the United States Environmental Protection Agency awarded Atlantic Cape an Energy Star rating after the college enacted energy efficient projects at its three campuses, such as eliminating Chlorofluorocarbon (CFC) from cooling systems, removing underground storage tanks, and installing motion detectors in its lighting systems. The college added four solar panels Photovoltaic systems in parking lots at the Mays Landing and Cape May campuses, built by Marina Energy, LLC. The panels would generate 2.2 Megawatts, which is about half of each campus's power needs, and is enough power to electrify 220 homes.

== Organization and administration ==
Jason Abreu

Jason Abrue is the 10th President in Atlantic Cape's 62-year history. Previous presidents include Barbara Gaba, Peter L. Mora from 2005 to 2016, John T. May from 1993 to 2005, William A. Orth from 1987 to 1993, Ronald W. Bush from 1984 to 1986, Lawrence R. Winchell, Jr. from 1973 to 1984, Wallace Appelson from 1970 to 1973, Luther G. Shaw from 1966 to 1970, and the college's first president, Walton Brown, who served from 1964 to 1966.

The Atlantic Cape Community College Board of Trustees has 14 members. The Atlantic County Executive appoints seven members, with approval by the county Board of Chosen Freeholders. The Cape May County Board of Chosen Freeholders appoints three members. The Governor of New Jersey appoints two members, the Atlantic and Cape May county superintendent are members by statute, and the final member is an alumnus chosen from the preceding year's graduating class.

== Campuses ==
=== Mays Landing ===
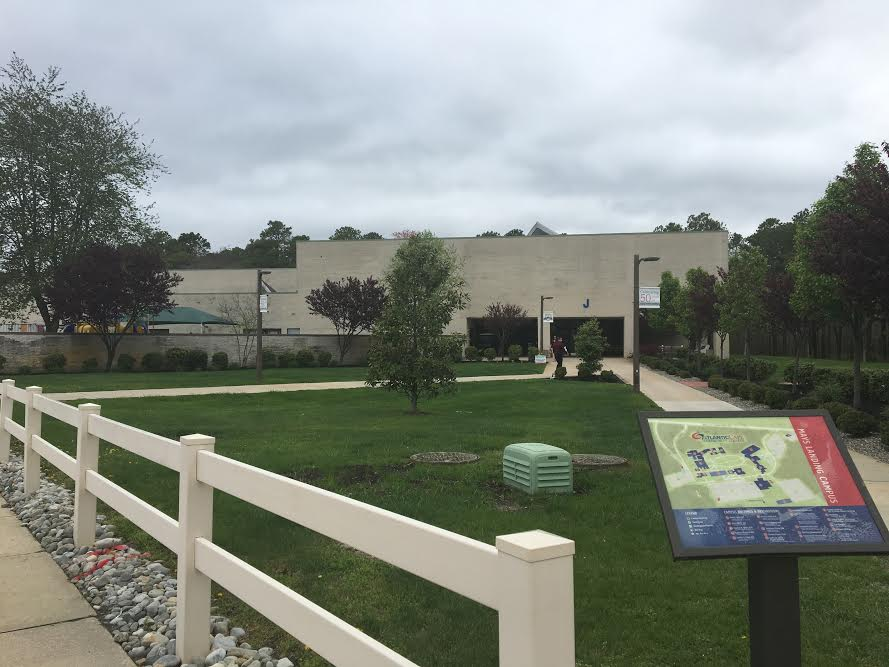
Mays Landing Administration Building

On November 19, 1964, the permanent location for Atlantic Community College was selected in Mays Landing, located on the Black Horse Pike. In November 1966, a groundbreaking ceremony was held in Mays Landing for the nine-building complex, which opened in February 1968. A $7 million expansion project began in 1980, completed in Spring 1982, to add two buildings and additional space for offices, classes, and student services. This expansion project also marked the beginning of the college's Academy of Culinary Arts. In 1990, the William J. Spangler Library was expanded to add a mezzanine, a computer lab, and additional offices and classrooms. The Academy of Culinary Arts completed a 28,250 ft^{2} (2,625 m^{2}) expansion in October 1991, adding a new entrance, an atrium lobby, a 90-seat gourmet restaurant, and additional offices and storage areas. In 2010, the college renovated the gymnasium locker rooms and added fitness center for staff and students.

=== Charles D. Worthington Atlantic City Center ===
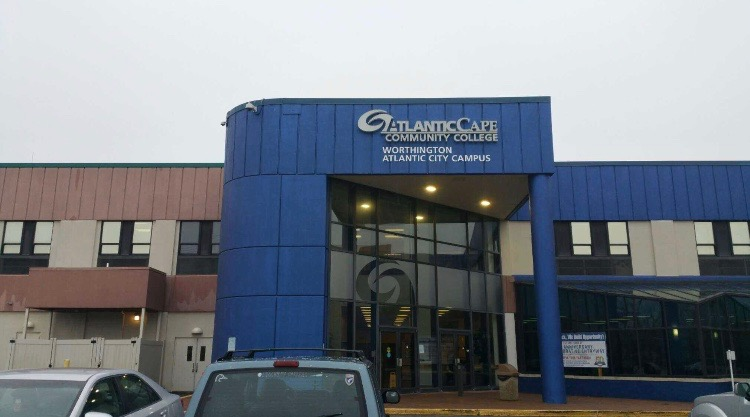
Front of the Worthington Building

In April 2001, the Atlantic City Campus was renamed the Charles D. Worthington Atlantic City Center, after Atlantic County's first county executive; Worthington had supported the development of the facility in the city. In 2008, the building renovated 9,000 ft^{2} (840 m^{2}) of space to add the Health Professionals Institute.

=== Cape May County Campus ===
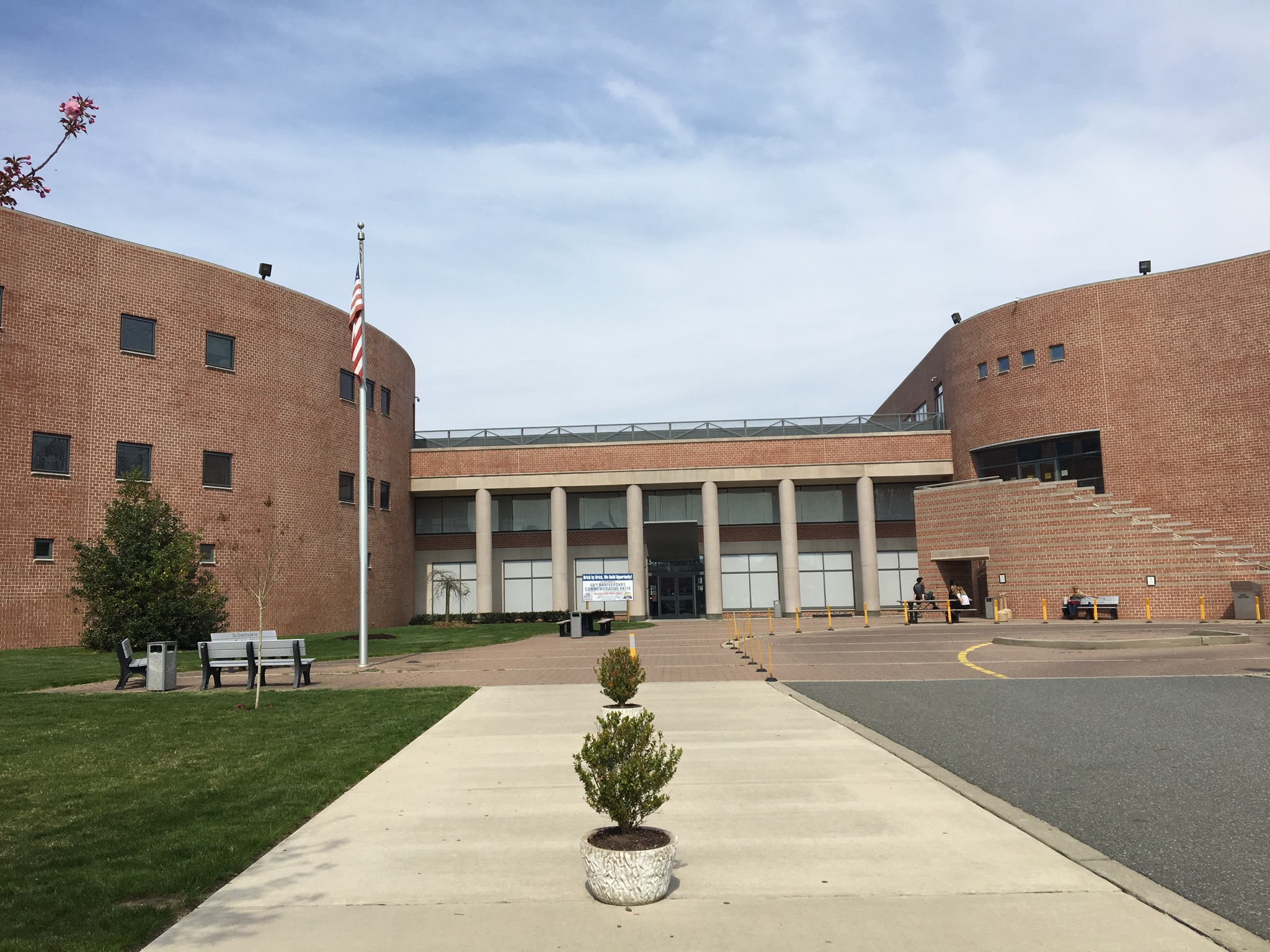
Image of the front of Cape May campus

The Cape May County Campus is a 68,000 ft^{2} (6,300 m^{2}) facility that has a library, cafeteria, lecture hall, and 19 classrooms, including six computer labs. There are two three-story wings, joined by an open two-story entranceway. There are 18 full-time professors worked alongside adjuncts on the campus. The campus has 300 parking spots, and is linked to local mass transportation by NJ Transit Bus Route 552. The Cape May facility typically accounted for about 21% of the college's overall enrollment.

After Cape May was added to Atlantic Community College, a Site Assessment Task Force identified 19 potential locations for a permanent campus. In May 1999, the committee selected a 29 acres (12 ha) site in Cape May Court House, located on fairground land obtained in the 1970s that also housed the Rutgers Cooperative Extension Service, as well as 4-H Foundation. The location was close to regional roadways, other educational facilities, and commercial areas. In June 1999, the college chose a consortium of architects to design the new facility: Duca/Huder & Kumlin, and Garrison Architects. The initial opening date was projected for Fall 2001, with a projected cost of $10 million. The New Jersey Council of Community Colleges provided $7.5 million toward the new building, and the Cape May County Board of Freeholders secured a $12 million loan for the project. The project was halted due to opposition from neighbors, believing the college would negatively impact their livelihood, as well as environmental groups. Two endangered species – the Cope's gray tree frog and the Tiger salamander – were both located on the project site, as were two threatened species – red-headed woodpecker and the barred owl. The college developed a plan to protect the animals by redesigning the building, obstructing animal access to roads, planting additional trees, building nest boxes, and re-purposing the water management system as breeding sights. Permits for sewage extension and coastal building also delayed the project.

Under the Coastal Area Facility Review Act, the New Jersey Department of Environmental Protection approved the project in February 2002 with restrictions; due to the presence of endangered species and location in a coastal zone, the agency banned future development on 18 of the 29 acre site. The building and parking lot would take up 7.16 acres (2.90 ha), access roads would take up 1 acre (0.40 ha), and water basins would consist of 4.14 acres (1.68 ha). The land was also located on Green Acres-designated land. In exchange for developing on protected grounds, the Cape May County Freeholders requested that the land be diverted, using $150,000 for new open space lands and $500,000 to buy new parks, totaling 127 acres (51 ha) of newly protected land.

Despite signatures from over 1,500 residents in opposition, the New Jersey State House Commission unanimously approved the project on September 19, 2002. On October 3, college, county, and state officials – including Governor Jim McGreevey – attended the groundbreaking ceremony for the new Cape May campus. Three days later, the Superior Court of New Jersey Appellate Division supported the decision to divert the park lands for the project. After the groundbreaking, the lands were cleared, and construction began in earnest in March 2004. That August, the Atlantic Cape Board of Trustees petitioned the New Jersey Commission on Higher Education to designate the new facility as a comprehensive, full service branch campus; this was approved in July 2005. On August 24, 2005, the Cape May campus opened to a ribbon-cutting ceremony, and classes began 13 days later. The new facility ultimately cost $15.4 million, $5.4 million more than the projected cost.

== Student life ==
The college's archery team has been successful over the years, winning national team championships in 1977, 1978, 1980, 2006, 2009 and 2014.

In 2016, the Federal Communications Commission approved the license for Atlantic Cape Community College to operate a low-power FM radio station. Branded as "Radio Mays Landing", the station had the call sign of WRML-LP, broadcast at the frequency of 107.9 MHz. The station utilizes a 268 ft (81.7 m) airport surveillance radar tower located at the west end of the Mays Landing campus, which was built in 1996. The station broadcasts a collection of music programs and talk shows that are programmed by current students and alumni.

== Notable alumni ==
- Lorenzo Langford (born c. 1955), politician who served from 2008 to 2014 as Mayor of Atlantic City, New Jersey.
- Aaron McCargo Jr. (born 1971), chef, TV personality and TV show host, best known as the winner of the fourth season of the Food Network's reality television show, The Next Food Network Star.
- Michael Schlow (born c. 1964), chef and restaurateur who attended the Academy of Culinary Arts.
- Al Szolack (born 1950), retired basketball player best known for his time spent on the Washington Generals, the traveling exhibition team who plays against, and almost always loses to, the Harlem Globetrotters.

== Notable faculty ==
- Andrew Fields, collegiate basketball coach and a retired professional basketball player who was named as men's baseball head coach in 2011.

== See also ==
- New Jersey County Colleges
