= WPAT-FM (1949–1951) =

Radio station in Paterson, New Jersey

WPAT-FM (originally WNNJ) was a short-lived commercial radio station in Paterson, New Jersey, which operated from 1949 until early 1951. The station ended operations after its transmitter tower was destroyed in a windstorm, and the owners concluded that it would be too expensive to repair the damage.

== History ==
WNNJ was originally authorized as a Class B FM station on 103.5 MHz to Donald Flamm and James V. Cosman, who also owned AM station WPAT in Paterson, New Jersey. In mid-1948 the Passaic Herald-News purchased a 90 percent interest in WPAT and the not-yet built WNNJ. This sale was approved by the Federal Communications Commission (FCC) in December 1948.

At this time the Herald-News already owned a Paterson FM station, WWDX on 107.1 MHz, and contemporary FCC regulations did not permit licensees to operate more than one FM station in a given community. WWDX was only authorized to transmit with 190 watts, while WNNJ was authorized for 8,000 watts. The decision was made to shut down WWDX, which made its final broadcast on January 9, 1949, with station management reporting that the "outstanding program features [of WWDX] will be incorporated into the schedule of WNNJ". WWDX was formally deleted on January 18, 1949, "in fulfillment of condition to grant of purchase by Daily News of WPAT (AM) and WNNJ (FM) Paterson".

WNNJ made its formal debut broadcast on February 1, 1949. A few months later, the station's callsign was changed to WPAT-FM.

In late November 1950 WPAT-FM's transmitter tower on Garret Mountain was blown down during the Great Appalachian Storm of 1950. The station was subsequently deleted on March 8, 1951, with a contemporary report giving the reason as "Tower destroyed by storm; too expensive to replace." In 1957 a new WPAT-FM debuted, operating on 93.1 MHz. In 1958, the original WPAT-FM's vacated frequency of 103.5 MHz was assigned to a new station licensed the New York City suburb of Lake Success, New York, WGLI-FM (now WKTU).
