= WYRS =

Coordinates: 39.640°N 74.292°W

- Manahawkin, New Jersey; United States
- Broadcast area: Ocean County, New Jersey
- Frequency: 90.7 MHz

Programming
- Format: Christian

Ownership
- Owner: WYRS Broadcasting

History
- First air date: March 27, 1995
- Call sign meaning: We're Your Radio Station

Technical information
- Licensing authority: FCC
- Class: B1
- ERP: 15,000 watts
- HAAT: 80 meters

Links
- Public license information: Public file; LMS
- Website: www.wyrs.org

WYRS (90.7 FM) is a religious radio station in Manahawkin, New Jersey, United States that first aired March 27, 1995.

== History ==
WYRS first went on the air at 4:00 pm on March 27, 1995, with a mix of Christian and community programming. Originally, broadcasts were in mono and the station was only on the air on a part-time schedule. The studios were in an 18' by 25' space in the station manager Bob Wick's basement and the station leased room on the Manahawkin transmitter tower of WJRZ. Studio equipment was a mix of broadcast equipment discarded by other radio stations and consumer-grade audio components (cassette and CD players and turntables). The staff was and remains to this day entirely volunteer.

The original schedule was: 4:30 pm–11:00 pm (Mon-Fri)/12:30 pm–10:30 pm (Sat)/3 pm-11 pm (Sun)

During summer 1996, the station expanded its broadcast hours to 7:00 am - midday daily. By summer 1997, it was broadcasting 24 hours a day in stereo.

On July 10, 2007, WYRS began broadcasting from its new location, the former marine coastal radio station WSC.

== Programming ==
Some slogans that WYRS uses are "Community Radio With A Christian Perspective", "Tune In and Tell A Friend" and "We're Your Radio Station".

WYRS carries national programs such as Grace to You with John MacArthur, Thru the Bible with J. Vernon McGee, Insight for Living with Chuck Swindoll, Focus on the Family, Turning Point with David Jeremiah, Back to the Bible with Woodrow Kroll and VCY America's Music Til Dawn, as well as locally produced programs. Locally produced programs include an hour block on weekday evenings where local churches air edited versions of their Sunday sermons, Ain't Misbehavin' (bluegrass-themed program on Saturday mornings), The Setback featuring big band music on Saturday afternoons and Reflections, a show hosted by Bob Wick, the general manager of WYRS, on Saturday evenings. WYRS carries IRN/USA news at the top of every hour.

WYRS also hosts live remote broadcasts each year from Manahawkin Founder's Day.

90.7 was originally given the WAGB call letters on December 17, 1993, and switched to WYRS on January 31, 1994.

== Translators ==
WYRS is also heard on 91.7 WLNJ in Lakehurst, New Jersey, as well as a low powered translator on 102.5 in Whiting, New Jersey.

Call sign	Frequency	City of license	FID	ERP (W)	Class	FCC info
WLNJ	91.7 FM	Lakehurst, New Jersey	174908	3,500	A	LMS
W273AO	102.5 FM	Whiting, New Jersey	151871	40	D	LMS
