= WEMG =

Spanish-language contemporary hit radio station in Philadelphia

- Camden, New Jersey; United States
- Broadcast area: Philadelphia metropolitan area
- Frequency: 1310 kHz (C-QUAM AM stereo)
- Branding: La Mega 105.7

Programming
- Language: Spanish
- Format: Contemporary hit radio
- Affiliations: Philadelphia Eagles (Spanish)

Ownership
- Owner: Mega-Philadelphia, LLC, Debtor in Possession; (Minority Radio Broadcasting, LLC)

History
- First air date: September 19, 1924
- Former call signs: WFBI (1924–1926); WCAM (1926–1980); WSSJ (1980–2001)
- Former frequencies: 890 kHz (1924–1928); 1340 kHz (1928–1929); 1280 kHz (1929–1941)
- Call sign meaning: Letters transposed meaning "Mega"

Technical information
- Licensing authority: FCC
- Facility ID: 74073
- Class: B
- Power: 1,000 watts (day); 250 watts (night)
- Transmitter coordinates: 39°57′28.41″N 75°6′52.63″W
- Translator: See § Translators
- Repeater: 97.3 WENJ-HD2 (Millville)

Links
- Public license information: Public file; LMS
- Webcast: Listen live
- Website: www.lameganation.com

WEMG (1310 kHz, La Mega 105.7) is a commercial AM radio station licensed to serve Camden, New Jersey. The station is owned by Mega-Philadelphia, LLC, Debtor in Possession and airs a Latin pop format.

== History ==
The station was first licensed, as WFBI, to the Galvin Radio Supply Company at 521 Market Street, on September 19, 1924. The original call letters were randomly assigned from a sequential roster of available call signs. In 1926, after the station was bought by the City of Camden, New Jersey, the call letters were changed to WCAM.

In the 1940s, the station shared time on its frequency with WTNJ in Trenton and WCAP in Asbury Park; an agreement implemented in 1949, ended the time-share and allowed WCAM to become a full-time station, although with lower power than it had previously used.

WCAM broadcast a variety of formats over the years. From September 1965 to April 1966, it was the Philadelphia-area affiliate of the NBC Radio Network, and it was the radio flagship of the Philadelphia Flyers in the team's second season, 1968–69. The station was not consistently profitable, and the city began attempting to sell it in the mid-1960s. After a few false starts, a deal was finally made in the late 1970s and the station was sold to Philadelphia cable TV operator Wade Communications. Wade changed the call sign to WSSJ in 1980, and a few years later sold the station to a group led by a local businessman and a station employee. In 1998, they sold WSSJ for $2 million to Spanish-language broadcaster Alfredo Alonso, owner of Mega Communications, which at the time operated WEMG (900 AM) in Philadelphia. In 2001, Mega sold the license for 900, and moved the WEMG call sign to the Camden-licensed station. In September 2001, WEMG flipped to Spanish contemporary hit radio. Mega sold the operation to Davidson Media Group in 2005.

Davidson originally operated WEMG as primarily a brokered radio station, offering time slots for sale to persons or businesses who then broadcast programs on a variety of different topics or presented music programs of their own design. For the past several years, WEMG has transitioned to more station-originated programming. Today, several brokered programs remain on the air; most present music and are heard mainly on weekends. The station also carries Spanish language play-by-play of the NFL's Philadelphia Eagles.

Mega's 2014 weekday announcer lineup includes El Show de Luis Jimenez (a nationally syndicated program) in mornings, Jorge "El Chico Malo" Melendez (WEMG's program director) in middays, "Rudy Rudisimo" Garcia in afternoons, and DJ Jay Serrano in evenings.

WEMG is active in the Philadelphia and South Jersey Latino communities. Mega is supporting sponsor of numerous neighborhood events including La Parada San Juan Bautista in Camden and Concilio's Hispanic Fiesta in Philadelphia, and is a partner with other leading Hispanic organizations in their activities.

== Translators ==
Mega programming is broadcast on the following translators:

Call sign	Frequency (MHz)	City of license	Facility ID	Class	ERP (W)	Height (m (ft))	Transmitter coordinates	Rebroadcasts
W277BA	103.3	Millville, New Jersey	141526	D	133	60 m (200 ft)	39°25′18.4″N 75°01′13.6″W	WENJ-HD2
W230AA	93.9	Atlantic City, New Jersey	41178	D	250	95 m (312 ft)	39°25′35.4″N 74°33′42.6″W	WENJ-HD2
W289AZ	105.7	Camden, New Jersey	141522	D	250	43 m (141 ft)	39°57′28.4″N 75°06′52.6″W	WEMG

Mega programming is also available via a simulcast on the HD2 subchannel of 97.3 WENJ.
