= WWDX (New Jersey) =

Radio station in Paterson, New Jersey (1947–1949)

WWDX was a short-lived commercial FM radio station in Paterson, New Jersey, which operated from late 1947 until January 9, 1949. During this time station licensees were not allowed to have more than one FM station in a given community, so WWDX was shut down after its owners made arrangements to purchase a more powerful station, WNNJ, also located in Paterson.

== History ==
WWDX was owned by the Passaic Herald-News, which was controlled by the Dow H. Drukker family. The station, assigned to 107.1 MHz, began test broadcasts in mid-December 1947 from a temporary studio located at its Garret Mountain transmitter site.

In mid-1948 the newspaper purchased a 90 percent interest in AM station WPAT, which also held a construction permit for a Class B FM station, WNNJ, on 103.5 MHz. This sale was approved by the Federal Communications Commission (FCC) in December 1948. At this time FCC regulations did not permit licensees to operate more than one FM station in a given community. WWDX was only authorized to transmit with 190 watts, while WNNJ was authorized for 8,000 watts. The decision was made to shut down WWDX, which made its final broadcast on January 9, 1949, with station management reporting that the "outstanding program features [of WWDX] will be incorporated into the schedule of WNNJ". WWDX was formally deleted on January 18, 1949, "in fulfillment of condition to grant of purchase by Daily News of WPAT (AM) and WNNJ (FM) Paterson". (Note: WWDX's former 107.1 frequency assignment is now used by WXPK. WNNJ, as WPAT-FM, was deleted in early 1951.)

Notable announcers who worked at WWDX included Bob Clayton and Frank Marth.
