= WRML-LP =

Radio station of Atlantic Cape Community College in Mays Landing, New Jersey

Coordinates: 39.4615°N 74.6812°W

- Mays Landing, NJ; United States
- Frequency: 107.9 MHz
- Branding: Radio Mays Landing

Programming
- Language: English
- Format: College Radio

Ownership
- Owner: Atlantic Cape Community College

History
- First air date: January 2016
- Former call signs: WACC (internet-only stream)
- Call sign meaning: Radio Mays Landing

Technical information
- Licensing authority: FCC
- Facility ID: 193228
- Class: L1
- ERP: 76 watts
- HAAT: 35 meters (115 ft)

Links
- Public license information: LMS
- Website: wrmlradio.org

WRML-LP is a low-power college FM radio station licensed to the Mays Landing section of Hamilton Township, Atlantic County, New Jersey, United States, transmitting on an FM frequency of 107.9 megahertz. It is owned by Atlantic Cape Community College, with staff running daily behind-the-scenes operations. Live programming is produced and presented entirely by current student volunteers.

== History ==
The radio station concept for the college began decades prior to its FM launch, when audio transmissions were originally being broadcast via closed circuit only. The station was first used to transmit exclusively to internal areas of the college, including the cafeteria and Student Life Center. Eventually, the station began broadcasting as an online-only internet stream that was branded as "WACC" (even though these call letters were never officially granted by the FCC).

Atlantic Cape Community College first expressed an interest in offering a new radio station that would be on terrestrial FM, when they requested a low-power FM license on December 9, 2014. A construction permit was granted to the college by the FCC on January 14, 2015. Broadcast tests on the FM radio band began as early as August 2015, with a steady test of the audio occurring in January 2016. The station's license to cover was filed on March 29, 2016, with it being granted as a fully licensed radio station on April 4, 2016.

While the original closed circuit audio has been discontinued, the internet stream continues to this day, now serving as a relay of the terrestrial FM signal.

== Programming ==
WRML-LP is on the air 24 hours a day, and broadcasts a variety of shows that are programmed by the student body, many of whom are enrolled in broadcasting degrees. The station's format, while officially "college", can also be considered freeform. Many of the live shows on WRML take advantage of social media outlets such as Facebook and Twitter to help with independent promotion, while other programs also have full websites. Program schedules are usually updated and retooled each college semester, with some shows leaving (and new ones taking their places), due to student needs. Whenever there is no live programming by a student on the air, an automated system, MegaSeg, transmits a variety of different blocks of programming, from rock and jazz, to jam sessions and popular music.

=== Former original programming ===
- "Tea Time" (love songs & soft rock) - Hosted by Adrianna Hill (discontinued in May, 2016)
- "The Mix" (spanish music hits) - Hosted by Adam Chen (discontinued in May, 2016)
- "EDM with TBM" (electronic dance music) - Hosted by Amador Campos (discontinued in May, 2016)
- "Tuesday JuicePop" (current pop music and culture) - Hosted by Eric Conklin & Leo Garcia (discontinued in August, 2016)
- "Hip Hop and R&Beats" (hip-hop) - Hosted by Leo Garcia (discontinued in September, 2016)
- "Groove Time" (smooth jazz music) - Hosted by Dorian Gilmer (discontinued in September, 2016)
- "Highly Dysfunctional" (variety) - Hosted by Mike Lewis & Ashley Vassallo (discontinued in November, 2016)
- "Music Bash" (hip-hop) - Hosted by Demetrius Letson (discontinued in December, 2016)
- "Broken Radio" (rock & roll music) - Hosted by Dylan Graef (discontinued in December, 2016)
- "Keepin' It Real" (rap music) - Hosted by Jordan Knight & Evan Barnett (discontinued in December, 2016)
- "The Power Hour" (variety) - Hosted by Jonathan Santiago (discontinued in April, 2017)
- "Millennial Memories" (millennial-era music) - Hosted by Maddie Brennan (discontinued in May, 2017)
- "The Reel Deal" (variety) - Hosted by Eric Smith & Ethan Gabrysz (discontinued in December, 2017)
- "The Sports Rant" (sports talk) - Mondays from 10am-12pm - Hosted by Dashawn Hendricks & Christian Paulino (discontinued in June, 2018)
- "The Chef's Hour" (country music, classic rock & cooking talk) - Hosted by Peter Srocsynski (discontinued in June, 2018)
- "The Renegade" (nineties music/post-grunge) - Hosted by Nick Derr (discontinued in June, 2018)
- "L&G Eats" (cooking talk) - Hosted by Lori Gunther & Gabby Wyand (discontinued in June, 2018)
- "Fatale" (music & conversation for women) - Hosted by Meghan Clark (discontinued in June, 2018)
- "Mellow Minutes" (variety) - Hosted by Mad K Productions (discontinued in June, 2018)
- "Pop Theory" (variety) - Hosted by Sarah Heintz (discontinued in June, 2018)
- "The 1" (sports talk) - Hosted by Dashawn Hendricks (discontinued in December, 2018)
- "A Reason to Smile" (country music & rock) - Hosted by David Baurder (discontinued in December, 2018)
- "Sound Check" (classic rock & alternative) - Hosted by Enzo Ronchi (discontinued in December, 2018)
- "Gamerz" (variety & video game talk) - Hosted by Demetrius Letson & Kerrick Capaldi (discontinued in December, 2018)
- "Anything Goes" (variety) - Hosted by Jackson Neill (discontinued in December, 2018)
- "Genre Wake-Up" (alternating musical genres) - Hosted by Erik Treadwell (discontinued in December, 2018)
- "Musical Moments" (jazz & rhythm/blues) - Hosted by Jamie Masso ( discontinued in December, 2018)
- "Free Delivery" (avant-garde music) - Hosted by M.C. Eggroll (discontinued in December, 2018)
- "To Be Determined" (classic rock) - Hosted by Jeff Standhope (discontinued in December, 2018)
- "Rock 'N Stop" (rock music) - Hosted by Nick Frantz, Joe "Colton" Bonsall & Kerrick Capardi (discontinued in December, 2018)
- "Chill with Wil" (ambient music) - Hosted by Wilmarielle Cambrelen( discontinued in June, 2019)
- "NOS (New-Old Stock)" (independent music) - Hosted by Niko Berardo (discontinued in June, 2019)

== See also ==
- College radio
- List of college radio stations in the United States
