= WMGM (FM) =

Rock radio station in Atlantic City, New Jersey, United States

Coordinates: 39.3901°N 74.5121°W

- Atlantic City, New Jersey; United States
- Broadcast area: Atlantic County, New Jersey
- Frequency: 103.7 MHz
- Branding: 103.7 WMGM Rocks

Programming
- Format: Active rock

Ownership
- Owner: Longport Media, LLC
- Sister stations: WBSS; WOND; WTKU-FM

History
- First air date: June 14, 1961
- Former call signs: WOSJ (1961–1964)
- Call sign meaning: Former call letters of 1050 AM in New York City, which was once owned by Metro-Goldwyn-Mayer

Technical information
- Licensing authority: FCC
- Facility ID: 61100
- Class: B
- ERP: 50,000 watts
- HAAT: 106 meters (348 ft)

Links
- Public license information: Public file; LMS
- Webcast: Listen live
- Website: 1037wmgm.com

WMGM (103.7 FM) is a radio station licensed to Atlantic City, New Jersey, playing active rock. WMGM serves most of southern New Jersey from Toms River to Cape May. Its studios are in Linwood, New Jersey, and its transmitter is in Pleasantville, New Jersey.

== History ==
The station first signed on with 2,800 watts on June 14, 1961, as WOSJ, later as WMGM. The 1960s were simulcasts of WOND, and good music, then home-made Top 40 tapes. Power was increased to 20,000 watts in stereo in 1972, live daytime and recorded overnights DJs Jim Earle (also program director) Steve Bryant (later of QVC and Ron Popeil TV pitches), Terry Price, Elliot Nachbar, Tom McNally did mornings and others. In 1973, the station moved its offices and studios (along with its AM sister-station, WOND) from Pleasantville to Linwood, and changed format to TM's automated "beautiful music" called "Your Beautiful Island" with a new SMC Automation System and then switched to TM's "Stereo Rock" and the name "Rock 104" on August 31, 1976. Current songs were back announced by John Borders "and before that ...".

From 1980 to 1982, Rock 104 went live with "McNally in the Morning" with program director/chief engineer Tom McNally. WMGM went 100% live in November 1982 with Mike Boyle, music director Mark DiDia, Russ Egan, Karen Chamberlain, Eric Johnson, Jim Spector, Rona Richman, Johnny Russell, Al Horner, Tom Sappie, Patrick DeMarco, Kathy Knoll, Al Branca, with Marlon Barrow, and Donna Richards. WMGM's power was increased to 50,000 watts in 1985 with a higher tower. The station twas renamed "104/MGM" in 1986.

On October 5, 1987, WMGM switched to a contemporary hit radio format, with jocks including Ellis B. "Bruce The Bear" Feaster, John and Ken, and "The Mudman". The station referred to itself as "104/MGM, The Hottest Hits". In August 1991, WMGM became "Sunny 104", with an adult contemporary format, which evolved into a 1970s music format by 1995, with "Classic Hits 103.7" being used by February 1997.

In February 2000, WMGM became "103.7 The Shark" with a classic rock format.

On August 17, 2011, The Shark became "103.7 WMGM Rocks" with a mainstream rock format programmed by market vet Paul Kelly. The station's on-air staff includes Matt Murray, Sean Patrick, Moon, Lauren, Rich Russo and Tommy T-Bone. WMGM is also the South Jersey home to the Dave & Mahoney Show, Skratch N Sniff and Full Metal Jackie.

In March 2024, WMGM underwent several signal improvements; however, the station's signal remains directional to protect WNNJ.
