= WJLK-FM =

- Asbury Park, New Jersey; United States
- Broadcast area: Monmouth County–Northern Ocean County–Middlesex County
- Frequency: 94.3 MHz (HD Radio)
- Branding: 94-3 The Point

Programming
- Format: Hot adult contemporary
- Affiliations: Compass Media Networks

Ownership
- Owner: Townsquare Media; (Townsquare License, LLC)
- Sister stations: WCHR-FM; WJLK; WOBM; WOBM-FM

History
- First air date: November 20, 1947
- Former call signs: WDJT (1946); WJLK (1946–1950); WJLK-FM (1950–2006); WJLK (2006–2023)
- Call sign meaning: J. Lyle Kinmonth, former publisher of the Asbury Park Press (former owner)

Technical information
- Licensing authority: FCC
- Facility ID: 14907
- Class: A
- ERP: 1,300 watts
- HAAT: 152 meters (499 ft)
- Transmitter coordinates: 40°13′45″N 74°05′25″W

Links
- Public license information: Public file; LMS
- Webcast: Listen live
- Website: 943thepoint.com

WJLK-FM (94.3 FM; "The Point") is a commercial radio station licensed to Asbury Park, New Jersey, and serving Monmouth County, Northern Ocean County and Middlesex County. It broadcasts a hot adult contemporary format and is owned by Townsquare Media, along with sister stations WCHR-FM, WOBM, WOBM-FM, and WJLK.

WJLK-FM has an effective radiated power (ERP) of 1,300 watts. Its transmitter is near Exit 100 along the Garden State Parkway in Tinton Falls, New Jersey. WJLK-FM broadcasts using HD Radio technology.

== History ==
=== Asbury Park Press ===
WJLK-FM was created when the Asbury Park Press, a daily newspaper, wanted to expand its newly forming radio business in the 1940s. Originally destined to be WDJT at 104.3, by November 1946 the call letters had changed to WJLK, to honor J. Lyle Kinmonth, the former publisher of the Press, who died the previous year. In addition, shortly before the first broadcast, the station changed from 104.3 to 94.3 MHz.

The station's first broadcast took place on Kinmonth's birthday, November 20, 1947. When WJLK began, it was one of an estimated 75 FM radio stations nationwide. WJLK also made history as the first FM radio station in New Jersey to be licensed by the Federal Communications Commission (FCC). The station was dedicated to news and community information – it broadcast from 6:30 a.m. to midnight Monday through Saturday, and 8 a.m. to midnight on Sundays.

=== Adult contemporary and top 40 ===
Eventually, The Press purchased an AM radio station, WCAP, which was renamed WJLK, located at 1310 kHz. Both stations simulcast their programming. The newscasts for the station were 15 minutes long at the top of every hour, as well as a briefer at every half-hour. In between newscasts, there was a wide variety of shows featuring different types of music, or talk programs on specific subjects, such as gardening. In the mid 1960s, typical staffing included Everett Rudloff as station manager, Dick Lewis as assistant manager, Charles Hill as program director, and Frank Huber as station engineer.

The station occupied the top floor of the Asbury Park Press building, with two studios in addition to the transmitter cabinet and the control room, operated by the announcer / disk-jockey. Remaining floor space was devoted to a small lobby and reception area and desk, the station manager's office, the station engineer's office, a small studio for the assistant engineer's recording of transcriptions and tape cartridge announcements and advertisements, and desks for radio management and announcing staff as well as for radio advertising staff. The local Steinbach's department store (around the corner of Press Plaza) was a major advertiser.

The music standard was "easy listening" as it was then called. Typical special programming included a Broadway music show, an up-tempo "Rolling Home Show" (evening rush hour), Arthur Morris' gospel music program, Phyllis Kessel's ladies talk and commentary, and the Rev. Richard Holbrook's gospel preaching. There were also jazz and country music programs, as well as remote broadcasts of local evening high school basketball games. A news program from Fort Monmouth was also a regular feature. News was relayed in print from the news department one floor below as well as from a teletype machine in the station office.

By the mid 1970s, it was obvious that specialized stations that concentrated on one specific format were doing better than stations such as WJLK where the programs changed by the hour. Robert E. McAllen, an on-air personality in the early 1970s, devised a new format with its emphasis on adult contemporary music with block programming at night, playing top 40, oldies, or talk. For a time, WJLK-AM-FM subscribed to the automated "Hit Parade" music service, where the songs were announced by a prerecorded voice, with live newscasts around the clock from the Asbury Park Press newsroom.

During the 1980s, WJLK-FM adopted a top 40 format and was branded as "K-94" "New Jersey's Hit Music Station". Pat Gillen, was the program director and "your Pat in the afternoon". Tim Downs was morning drive, Carl Ross did mid days. Amy Wright handled the evening shifts and Dave Ulmann was the overnight host. Weekends were hosted Ed Healy, Gary Guida and Mike Abrams.

=== Change in ownership ===
In 1989, the company sold both WJLK and WJLK-FM to Devlin and Ferrari Broadcasting Company of New York for $12.5 million. The sale had been ordered by the FCC in exchange for allowing The Asbury Park Press to buy two Trenton stations, WBUD (1260 AM) and WKXW-FM (101.5), for $12.1 million.

By August 1989, the K-94 format was discontinued and the station returned to broadcasting adult contemporary. Then, in March 1993, the station began a simulcast with the 98.5 frequency and was billed as "Soft Rock WJLK". Slightly more than four years later, in May 1997, after being sold to Nassau Broadcasting, the simulcast was dropped and the station went towards the format it has today, broadcasting under "94.3 The Point".

=== Charities ===
From 1997 through May 2002, 94.3 The Point was one of the five stations referred to as Nassau Broadcasting Partner's "Shore Group" under the leadership of Vice President and general manager Don Dalesio. The format of WJLK-FM was rebranded and improved, and the station became a true leader in the market. After the terrorist attacks on September 11, 2001, the station became active in helping the community heal. A significant amount of money was raised for the families of World Trade Center victims. The Old Mill School in Wall, New Jersey (K-5), had a walk-a-thon and donated the money to the Nassau charity. As a result, The Point rewarded the kids by having Michelle Branch perform in the auditorium of their school in late 2001.

The Point and Jersey Shore Medical Center also organized "Kites Against Cancer" to benefit the breast care center at JSMC originally and eventually all of "The Breast Care Centers of The Meridian Healthcare." This successful event got The Point into the Guinness Book of World Records for flying the most kites at one time in a single location.

=== Millennium Radio ===
In June 2002, the sale of the "shore group" was completed and Millennium Radio Group took over WJLK-FM and its sister stations, WBBO, WOBM and WOBM-FM, WADB and eventually WCHR-FM.

In February 2009, WJLK started using new station IDs and branding, referring to itself as "The Jersey Shore's New Hit Music Channel!", despite still mostly playing adult contemporary music, in response to WHTG rebranding itself as "The Jersey Shore's Hit Music Connection" and adopting a top 40 format the previous month. The sound of WJLK has an emphasis on hits from today.

Also in 2009, WJLK lost part of its Ocean County coverage area due to the power increase of co-channel radio station WIBG-FM in Avalon. Since this time, WJLK's signal has become mostly un-listenable south of Forked River while WIBG-FM serves the Manahawkin, Long Beach Island and Tuckerton areas.

WJLK began simulcasting on WOBM (1160 AM) and its FM translator on 104.1 on July 10, 2023, expanding the station's coverage of northern Ocean County. WJLK readded the "-FM" suffix to its call sign on July 21, allowing WOBM to change its call sign to WJLK. The simulcast ended in March 2025, when Townsquare shut down WJLK AM.

== HD Radio ==
In July 2007, WJLK began broadcasting in HD Radio. In October 2007, WJLK launched an HD2 channel, which is a simulcast of the classic rock format from sister station 105.7 The Hawk (WCHR-FM). In 2009, WJLK-HD2 launched S*ALT ("ShoreAlternative.com") in response to WHTG's departure of the alternative format, attempting to fill the void left in the Monmouth/Ocean market. That ended in 2011, ahead of Townsquare Media acquiring Millennium Radio New Jersey.
