= WTKU-FM =

Coordinates: 39.205°N 74.659°W

Petersburg (Upper Township, New Jersey); United States
- Broadcast area: Atlantic City, New Jersey
- Frequency: 98.3 MHz
- Branding: Kool 98-3

Programming
- Format: Classic hits

Ownership
- Owner: Longport Media LLC.
- Sister stations: WBSS, WOND, WMGM-FM

History
- First air date: September 27, 1982; 43 years ago
- Former call signs: WDVR (1982–1987); WKTU (1987–1996); WTKU (1996–2006); WUSS (2006)

Technical information
- Licensing authority: FCC
- Facility ID: 3139
- Class: A
- ERP: 6,000 watts
- HAAT: 100 meters (330 ft)

Links
- Public license information: Public file; LMS
- Webcast: Listen Live
- Website: kool983.com

WTKU-FM (98.3 FM) is a radio station in Atlantic City, New Jersey, known as "Kool 98-3," playing a classic hits format.

== History ==
98.3 FM signed on the air in July 1984 as WDVR and featured an AOR and CHR a.k.a. Rock 40 format. In 1987 the station took WKTU as its call letters after New York City's 92.3 FM switched from WKTU to WXRK.

On February 13, 1996, call letters were changed to WTKU so that the call letters WKTU would be returned to New York City on 103.5 FM.

== See also ==
- WBSS (AM)
