= WCHR-FM =

Radio station in Manahawkin, New Jersey

- Manahawkin, New Jersey; United States
- Broadcast area: Ocean County–Atlantic County–Burlington County–Camden County
- Frequency: 105.7 MHz
- Branding: 105.7 The Hawk

Programming
- Language: English
- Format: Classic rock
- Affiliations: Compass Media Networks; United Stations Radio Networks

Ownership
- Owner: Townsquare Media; (Townsquare License, LLC)
- Sister stations: WJLK; WJLK-FM; WOBM; WOBM-FM

History
- First air date: March 14, 2002
- Former call signs: WAQB (1997); WNJO (1997–1998)

Technical information
- Licensing authority: FCC
- Facility ID: 24934
- Class: B1
- ERP: 13,000 watts
- HAAT: 140 meters (460 ft)
- Transmitter coordinates: 39°52′31.4″N 74°09′55.8″W

Links
- Public license information: Public file; LMS
- Webcast: Listen live
- Website: 1057thehawk.com

WCHR-FM (105.7 MHz), known as "105.7 The Hawk", is a radio station in Manahawkin, New Jersey, with a classic rock radio format. It is owned by Townsquare Media.

== Coverage area ==
WCHR-FM is the most powerful FM station in the Monmouth/Ocean market and can be heard as far west as the city of Philadelphia and Bucks County, Pennsylvania, as far north as Wall Township, New Jersey, and as far south as Ocean City.

The WCHR-FM antenna is co-located with 92.7 WOBM-FM and 104.1 W281CK on a tower located in Bayville.

== History ==
WCHR-FM shares its call sign with WCHR in Flemington, New Jersey, a Christian radio station in the Trenton area. The two stations are separately operated, but have been sister stations under Nassau Broadcasting and Townsquare Media.

The WCHR call sign originally associated with the Trenton station broadcasting at 94.5 FM, using a religious format (CHR standing for Christian radio). In February 1998, WCHR began simulcasting on 920 AM, and on March 2, 1998, 94.5 FM changed callsigns to WNJO as it changed format to oldies.

The 105.7 facility in Manahawkin was a construction permit that Nassau acquired in 1998. It was assigned the call sign WAQB on May 16, 1997, and changed to WNJO on December 19, 1997. When WCHR's religious unit moved to AM 920 from 94.5 FM, the permit on 105.7 picked up the WCHR-FM call sign.

On March 14, 2002, WCHR-FM signed on with a simulcast of 98.5 WBBO. On April 15, 2002, the WBBO simulcast ended, and a classic rock format branded "105.7 The Hawk" launched. The first song played was "Born in the U.S.A." by Bruce Springsteen. Under general manager Don Dalesio and Nassau's vice president of programming Michelle Stevens, Nassau originated The Hawk exclusively for the Jersey Shore. They brought in veteran program director Jim Spector who, in turn, hired The Free Beer and Hot Wings Show. Nassau gave Millennium Radio the option to buy the station in the deal that transferred the ownership of WJLK-FM, WOBM-FM, WBBO, WADB and WOBM in June 2002. Nassau operated WCHR until its sale was completed a year later in July 2003.

In 2010, 105.7 the Hawk agreed to broadcast all regular season New York Jets football games.

The Hawk began broadcasting from a new facility in downtown Toms River on January 30, 2013.
