= WMNJ =

- Madison, New Jersey; United States
- Broadcast area: Madison, New Jersey

Programming
- Format: Free Form

Ownership
- Owner: Drew University

Technical information
- Licensing authority: FCC
- Facility ID: 17592
- Class: D
- Power: 1,2 00 watts
- HAAT: 23.0 meters
- Transmitter coordinates: 40°45′30.00″N 74°25′48.00″W

Links
- Public license information: Public file; LMS
- Website: https://www.wmnjradio.com/

WMNJ The Forest is an internet radio station owned and operated by Drew University. WMNJ began as an AM campus carrier station under the call letters WERD (or Drew backwards.) The station later became WMNJ FM on 88.9 and remained there for 30 years, WMNJ made its move to the Internet in Fall 2009. The station voluntarily surrendered its FM license in 2011.

WMNJ is operated by a student board of directors which is overseen by the Drew University Radio Advisory Board. The station is consulted by Pete Tauriello, noted New York Traffic Anchor for 1010 WINS Radio and former program director of the Shadow Traffic Network of New York, in addition to WERA Plainfield, N.J. and WBRW Somerville, N.J. Tauriello said, "Today's college student doesn't even own a radio. You won't find one in a dorm room. You will, however, find a laptop or tablet in every room and a phone device in every pocket and that is where our audience lives. I can also say it's nice to be out from under the thumb of the FCC. It frees up some revenue opportunities and gives our show hosts a little more breathing room. Not that we approve of F bombs bursting in air, but we no longer fear the fleeting expletive that could have cost us a years budget."

WMNJ music programming is free form. There are no music playlists. One of the station's most popular shows is "An Hour To Kill With Professor Bonn" hosted by criminologist Dr. Scott Bonn. examining the psychology of the serial killer. WMNJ hopes to launch a live 30 minute weekly radio drama in the fall of 2013.

In September 2012 WMNJ left 30-year-old studios and moved into studios in Drew University's new Ehinger Center.
