= WPGG =

Atlantic City, New Jersey; United States
- Frequency: 1450 kHz
- Branding: WPG Talk Radio 95.5

Programming
- Language: English
- Format: Talk radio
- Affiliations: Compass Media Networks; Fox News Radio; Premiere Networks; Radio America; Westwood One

Ownership
- Owner: Townsquare Media; (Townsquare License, LLC)
- Sister stations: WENJ; WFPG; WPUR; WSJO

History
- First air date: 1940
- Former call signs: WFPG (1940–1978); WIIN (1978–1988); WFPG (1988–2002); WKXW (2002–2006); WENJ (2006–2012)
- Call sign meaning: "World's Play Ground"

Technical information
- Licensing authority: FCC
- Facility ID: 10448
- Class: C
- Power: 1,000 watts
- Transmitter coordinates: 39°22′42.4″N 74°26′51.5″W
- Translator: 95.5 W238CZ (Atlantic City)
- Repeater: 97.3 WENJ-HD3 (Millville)

Links
- Public license information: Public file; LMS
- Webcast: Listen live
- Website: wpgtalkradio.com

WPGG (1450 AM; "WPG Talk Radio 95.5") is a commercial radio station licensed to Atlantic City, New Jersey. The station is owned by Townsquare Media and broadcasts a talk radio format. WPGG's studios and offices are on Tilton Road in Northfield, New Jersey.

WPGG is powered at 1,000 watts, using a non-directional antenna, its transmitter site is on Riverside Street near Absecon Boulevard (U.S. Route 30) in Atlantic City.

== History ==
The 1450 frequency in Atlantic City first hit the airwaves in 1940 with its call letters of WFPG, which stood for "World's Famous Play Ground". For several decades, WFPG aired a full service format, which included a mixture of adult standards, big band, and easy listening music, from studios on the world-famous Steel Pier on the Atlantic City boardwalk.

Towards the late 1970s, when casino gambling arrived in Atlantic City, WFPG became "Win 1450" and changed its call sign to WIIN, continuing its full-service format, albeit with an adult contemporary flavor. Later, the station used the taped, syndicated "Entertainers" MOR format, using live announcers in some dayparts.

In 1985, Roger Tees took over as news director and hired anchors, Jeff Scott, Greg Gaston, Carla Contento Kenny, and Vince Scanlon, along with sports director Jim Wise and sports anchor Greg Toland. When the all-news/talk anchors departed for other positions in larger markets, ratings plummeted.

On January 18, 1988, the WFPG call sign, which had remained in use on a co-owned FM station, returned to the AM facility.

For much of the 1990s, syndicated talk programs such as Bob Grant, Mike Gallagher, and Art Bell were mainstays of the station's line-up.

In 1999, WFPG became one of the first affiliates of the Comedy World Radio Network. A year later, Comedy World went out of business and the station resorted to simulcasting WFPG-FM during most hours.

Shortly after entering the new century, WFPG and its sister stations were purchased by Millennium Radio Group, which also owned New Jersey 101.5 in Trenton. In March 2002, New Jersey 101.5 began using 1450 as its South Jersey shore simulcast facility, with a call sign change from WFPG to WKXW.

In 2003, the New Jersey 101.5 simulcast moved to WXKW at 97.3 and ESPN Radio sports programming took its place. In June 2006, 1450 AM changed its call sign to WENJ to reflect its ESPN Radio branding.

In June 2009, the ESPN format was moved to WENJ-FM 97.3 and WENJ began to carry ESPN Deportes Radio. This lasted until January 2011, when ESPN Deportes was dropped for a simulcast of WENJ-FM.

On October 22, 2012, WENJ dropped the sports simulcast for talk, branded as "WPG Talk Radio 1450" with new call sign WPGG, paying tribute to the original WPG, a radio station owned by the city of Atlantic City from 1925 to 1938.

In November 2015, WPGG began simulcasting its programming on WSJO 104.9-HD2. In April 2016, translator W281BH began simulcasting WSJO 104.9-HD2, which brings WPGG's programming to 104.1 FM in the greater Atlantic City area. In May 2016, WPGG renamed itself to "WPG Talk Radio 104.1."

On August 2, 2017, Townsquare Media filed an application with the Federal Communications Commission requesting consent to construct and broadcast WPGG from a new translator station broadcasting on 95.5 FM and licensed to Atlantic City, New Jersey. On May 9, 2019, the station announced it was moving from 104.1 FM to 95.5 FM, effective immediately.

In July 2020, WPGG became the Atlantic City-Cape May radio market's top-rated news/talk station in both share and cume, per Nielsen's spring 2020 radio ratings survey results.
