= WENJ =

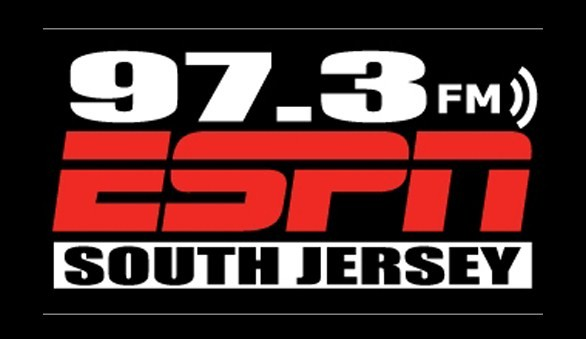

Millville, New Jersey; United States
- Broadcast area: South Jersey
- Frequency: 97.3 MHz (HD Radio)
- Branding: 97.3 ESPN

Programming
- Format: Sports
- Subchannels: HD2: Simulcast of WEMG (Spanish hits); HD3: Simulcast of WPGG (news/talk); HD4: "Rock 104.1" (classic rock)
- Affiliations: ESPN Radio; Compass Media Networks; Fútbol de Primera; Philadelphia 76ers; Philadelphia Eagles; Philadelphia Flyers; Touchdown Radio; Westwood One

Ownership
- Owner: Townsquare Media; (Townsquare License, LLC)
- Sister stations: WFPG; WPGG; WPUR; WSJO

History
- First air date: February 2, 1962 (as WMVB-FM)
- Former call signs: WMVB-FM (1962–1988); WBSS-FM (1988–2002); WIXM (2002–2006); WXKW (2006–2009); WENJ-FM (2009–2012)
- Call sign meaning: "ESPN New Jersey"

Technical information
- Licensing authority: FCC
- Facility ID: 72981
- Class: B
- ERP: 50,000 watts (analog); 2,000 watts (digital)
- HAAT: 142 meters (466 feet)
- Transmitter coordinates: 39°19′14.3″N 74°46′16.2″W
- Translators: HD2: 103.3 W277BA (Millville); HD2: 93.9 W230AA (Atlantic City); HD4: 104.1 W281BH (Absecon)

Links
- Public license information: Public file; LMS
- Webcast: Listen live; HD4: Listen live
- Website: www.973espn.com; HD4: rock1041.com

WENJ (97.3 FM) is a radio station that airs a sports radio format, licensed to Millville, New Jersey. Its transmitter is located in Corbin City, New Jersey, where it shares a tower with WRTQ. The station is affiliated with ESPN Radio. Its studios are in Northfield, New Jersey.

== History ==
WENJ first signed on February 2, 1962, as WMVB-FM, an FM sister station to WMVB (1440 AM), airing an easy listening format; through the 1970s, the station began to evolve to an adult contemporary format. In 1988 the station changed its call letters to WBSS-FM, for its branding as "The Boss 97 FM", and become a CHR station. In 1995, WBSS was sold to the owners of WKXW (101.5 FM), which switched the station to a simulcast of WKXW's news/talk and oldies format, with a small amount of local news.

On March 15, 2002, WBSS dropped the simulcast of WKXW in favor of a modern adult contemporary format, with a call change to WIXM (referring to the station's branding of "Mix 97.3") following a few weeks later.

In November 2004, in the wake of sister station WSJO debuting a hot adult contemporary format, WIXM reverted to the WKXW simulcast; two years later, the station was renamed to WXKW.

In May 2009, WKXW began to remove references to having a simulcast partner for South Jersey from its promotions, indicating a planned format change for WXKW; on June 1, the station switched to ESPN Radio as WENJ-FM. The sports format had previously been heard in the market on WENJ, which switched to ESPN Deportes Radio after a brief period of simulcasting. The station simulcast again on that station from January 2, 2011, to October 15, 2012.

On October 31, 2012, the station dropped the -FM suffix.

== Programming ==
=== Play-by-play sports ===
As of 2023, the station carries Philadelphia Eagles, Flyers and 76ers games and ESPN Radio's college football, MLB (including nationally broadcast Phillies games), NFL (in select weeks) and NBA coverage.

The station also carries game coverage from other networks, including Compass Media, Sports USA Radio Network, Touchdown Radio and Westwood One, mainly for college football, basketball and NFL coverage, the latter on a week-by-week rotational basis for select games (e.g. Sunday afternoon NFL games other than Eagles games).

== Translators ==
The following four translators simulcast the programming of WENJ, WENJ-HD2, or HD4

Call sign	Frequency	City of license	FID	ERP (W)	HAAT	Class	Transmitter coordinates	FCC info	Notes
W298DI	107.5 FM	Port Norris, New Jersey	85823	250	57 m (187 ft)	D	39°27′31.9″N 75°12′10.5″W	LMS	Simulcasts HD1
W277BA	103.3 FM	Millville, New Jersey	141526	133	55.3 m (181 ft)	D	39°25′20″N 75°1′13″W	LMS	Simulcasts HD2
W230AA	93.9 FM	Atlantic City	41178	250	95.06 m (312 ft)	D	39°22′35.4″N 74°33′42.6″W	LMS	Simulcasts HD2
W281BH	104.1 FM	Absecon, New Jersey	141576	250	95.06 m (312 ft)	D	39°22′35.4″N 74°33′42.6″W	LMS	Simulcasts HD4

On May 23, 2019, Townsquare Media launched "Rock 104.1" on WENJ-HD4 and W281BH, broadcasting a classic rock format.
