= WFPG =

Coordinates: 39°22′42.4″N 74°26′51.5″W

Atlantic City, New Jersey; United States
- Broadcast area: Jersey Shore
- Frequency: 96.9 MHz
- Branding: Lite 96.9 WFPG

Programming
- Format: Adult contemporary
- Affiliations: Compass Media Networks; Premiere Networks

Ownership
- Owner: Townsquare Media; (Townsquare License, LLC)
- Sister stations: WENJ; WPGG; WPUR; WSJO

History
- First air date: September 1962
- Call sign meaning: "World's Famous Playground"

Technical information
- Licensing authority: FCC
- Facility ID: 10449
- Class: B
- ERP: 50,000 watts
- HAAT: 110 meters (360 ft)

Links
- Public license information: Public file; LMS
- Webcast: Listen live
- Website: www.wfpg.com

WFPG (96.9 FM) is a commercial radio station in Atlantic City, New Jersey, known as "Lite 96.9 WFPG" It is owned by Townsquare Media and broadcasts an adult contemporary radio format, switching to Christmas music for much of November and December. The studios and offices are on Tilton Road in Northfield, New Jersey.

WFPG has an effective radiated power (ERP) of 50,000 watts, the current maximum for most FM stations in the Northeast. The transmitter is on Riverside Street, near Absecon Boulevard (U.S. Route 30) in Atlantic City. WFPG signal reaches 11 counties in South and Central New Jersey, plus parts of Pennsylvania and Delaware.

== History ==
WFPG-FM signed on the air in September 1962. It was the FM counterpart to WFPG (1450 AM, now WPGG). For most of its early decades, it was a beautiful music station, playing quarter hour sweeps of soft, mostly instrumental cover versions of popular songs, as well as Hollywood and Broadway show tunes. In the 1980s, as the easy listening format aged, the station added more vocals to the playlist to attract a younger audience. It eventually made the transition to soft adult contemporary music. During the early 2000s, the tempo picked up, making WFPG-FM a mainstream AC station. In April 2022, the station quietly changed its name to "Lite 96.9 WFPG".

WFPG is referenced in Steel Pier musical as the station broadcasting the play's dance marathon event.
