= WVBV =

Christian radio station in Medford Lakes, New Jersey

Coordinates: 39.5557°N 74.7463°W

- Medford Lakes, New Jersey; United States
- Broadcast area: Philadelphia, Pennsylvania
- Frequency: 90.5 (MHz) (HD Radio)
- Branding: Hope FM 90.5

Programming
- Format: Christian

Ownership
- Owner: Hope Christian Church of Marlton

History
- First air date: November 2005

Technical information
- Licensing authority: FCC
- Class: B
- ERP: 21,000 watts
- HAAT: 138 meters
- Translators: W209CP (89.7 MHz, Cape May)

Links
- Public license information: Public file; LMS
- Website: www.hopefm.net

WVBV or Hope-FM 90.5 is a Christian radio station in Medford Lakes, New Jersey on 90.5 FM. The station's primary focus is teaching the Bible and playing Christian music. The station is owned by Hope Christian Church of Marlton. Many of their teaching programs are produced by Calvary Chapel pastors, although they also run programs from other churches. The music is of the praise and worship variety, which they hope will "lead one into the worship of God without attracting too much attention to the music itself."

WVBV is simulcast on Class A radio stations WRSM 89.1 FM, licensed to Rising Sun, Maryland WWFP 90.5 FM, licensed to Brigantine, NJ and WZBL 88.1 FM, licensed to Barnegat Light, NJ. WZBL transmits with a power of 100 watts from the High Bar Harbor section of Long Beach Township.

== History ==
Calvary Chapel of Marlton began to look into the process for obtaining an FM radio station in 1995, after hearing Chuck Smith of Calvary Chapel Costa Mesa discuss how pleased he was with their station, KWVE-FM. The effort took more than 10 years and bore fruit in November 2005 when WVBV went on the air with 21,000 watts on 90.5 FM. In 2006, they began airing The AltarLife which features Brent Hughes and Geoff Desiato on Saturday and Sunday evenings from 9pm to 11pm. The show, originally created exclusively for HOPE FM, marked the first time that the station produced original programming, which resulted in the station becoming the top rated Christian station on the weekends among teens in the Philadelphia market. During its run, HOPE FM introduced the show to several other radio stations around the United States, which led to it being heard in Tennessee, Missouri, Oklahoma, as well as several other locations up and down the East Coast. On July 7, 2013, the final episode of The AltarLife aired, nearly 7 years to the day after its pilot originally aired.
