= WOBM-FM =

- Toms River, New Jersey; United States
- Broadcast area: Ocean County, New Jersey
- Frequency: 92.7 MHz
- Branding: 92.7 WOBM

Programming
- Format: Adult contemporary

Ownership
- Owner: Townsquare Media; (Townsquare License, LLC)
- Sister stations: WCHR-FM; WJLK; WJLK-FM; WOBM

History
- First air date: March 1, 1968; 58 years ago
- Call sign meaning: Ocean, Burlington, Monmouth

Technical information
- Licensing authority: FCC
- Facility ID: 59508
- Class: A
- ERP: 1,400 watts
- HAAT: 148 meters (486 ft)
- Transmitter coordinates: 39°52′31.4″N 74°9′55.8″W

Links
- Public license information: Public file; LMS
- Webcast: Listen live
- Website: wobm.com

WOBM-FM (92.7 MHz) is a commercial radio station known as "92.7 WOBM", licensed to Toms River and serving Ocean County, New Jersey. It airs an adult contemporary radio format.

The station is owned by Townsquare Media, as part of its Shore Group, along with WJLK (1160 AM), WJLK-FM (94.3), WCHR-FM (105.7) and WOBM (1310 AM). Shore Group studios are in Toms River, and WOBM-FM's transmitter is in Bayville, New Jersey.

== History ==
WOBM-FM signed on the air on March 1, 1968, with studios and transmitter on U.S. Route 9 in the Bayville section Berkeley Township. The station celebrated its 50th anniversary on March 1, 2018. For nearly all its time on the air, it has broadcast some form of middle of the road or adult contemporary music format, as well as Ocean County news.

On the station's 50th anniversary, long-time talk show host and former WOBM advertising salesman Bob Levy died at the age of 86.

The slogan "Ocean County's Soft Rock" was changed to "Ocean County's Best Variety" in January 2015.

The outbreak of COVID-19 had an impact on the number of personalities on the station with full-time personalities being tasked with hosting various weekend shows in place of live part-time weekend hosts.

The longtime "Jersey Shore Flashback Weekend", which began in April 2006, was renamed to "Feel Good '80s Weekend" in May 2020. The new weekend format launched on Memorial Day weekend and consists of fast, upbeat and feel-good music of the 1980s.

In November 2020, Diana Tyler was repositioned to the evening time slot temporarily hosted by Mark Anthony after the departure of 18-year station veteran Brian Moore in July. "JB" Wilde, was later repositioned to the afternoon time slot formerly hosted by Justin Louis for almost 15 years.

In November 2020, 92.7 WOBM's parent company, Townsquare Media, received significant backlash after firing multiple prominent personalities including Justin Louis. Andy Chase, Chris Varacchi, and Liz Jeressi of sister stations 105.7 The Hawk and 94.3 The Point were also fired.

With the exception of one ratings period, the station was a ratings powerhouse for almost ten years. In January 2021, 92.7 WOBM was rated one of the least listened to radio stations in Monmouth and Ocean Counties with a market share of just 2.1.

WOBM-FM began simulcasting on WADB (1310 AM) and its FM translator on 96.7 on July 10, 2023, expanding the station's coverage of Monmouth County. The simulcast ended in March 2025, when Townsquare shut down what had become WOBM AM.

== Topic A with Bob Levy ==
Topic A was a freeform talk program that aired every Sunday on 92.7 WOBM from 7:00 am until 10:00 am and eventually until 11:00 am for almost 40 years by local radio icon Bob Levy. The overall premise of the show was for callers to tell Levy what was on their mind. Often, the callers had a political agenda. Levy was never really political himself, although he identified as a Republican on-air, he was very much socially moderate.

In 2017, local philanthropist Jeremy Grunin joined the program as Levy's cohost.

Grunin took over the program in 2018 when Levy died and somewhat revamped the show to occasionally include guests.

The show was cancelled in May 2019 after Grunin announced he was stepping down. On his final show, he described a disagreement with station management as his primary reason for leaving the show.
