= WPAT-FM =

Tropical music radio station in New York City, US

- Paterson, New Jersey; United States
- Broadcast area: New York metropolitan area
- Frequency: 93.1 MHz (HD Radio)
- Branding: 93.1 Amor

Programming
- Language: Spanish
- Format: Tropical music
- Subchannels: HD2: Regional Mexican and urban "La Privada 93.1 HD2"

Ownership
- Owner: Spanish Broadcasting System; (WPAT Licensing, Inc.)
- Sister stations: WSKQ-FM

History
- First air date: March 1957
- Call sign meaning: Paterson, New Jersey

Technical information
- Licensing authority: FCC
- Facility ID: 51663
- Class: B
- ERP: 4,800 watts
- HAAT: 415 meters (1,362 ft)
- Transmitter coordinates: 40°44′54″N 73°59′9″W

Links
- Public license information: Public file; LMS
- Website: lamusica.com/en/stations/wpat

WPAT-FM (93.1 FM, "93.1 Amor") is a commercial radio station licensed to Paterson, New Jersey, and serving the New York metropolitan area. Owned by the Spanish Broadcasting System, it features a tropical music format, with studios on East 26th Street in Midtown Manhattan.

WPAT-FM's transmitter is located at the Empire State Building, and it broadcasts in HD Radio; its HD2 subchannel carries "La Privada," a Spanish-language regional Mexican and urban format.

== History ==
=== Beautiful music ===
WPAT-FM signed on the air in March 1957. It was the FM sister station of WPAT (930 AM), with studios in Newark, New Jersey. Its frequency of 93.1 MHz had previously been assigned to Edwin Howard Armstrong's pioneering FM station based in Alpine, New Jersey, KE2XCC. That station went off the air in 1954 with Major Armstrong's death. This was the second station to hold the WPAT-FM call sign. An earlier WPAT-FM, originally called WNNJ, had operated on 103.5 MHz from 1949 until its deletion in early 1951.

WPAT-AM-FM had a beautiful music format for nearly four decades. The stations aired quarter-hour sweeps of instrumental music, mostly cover versions of popular adult songs, Broadway and Hollywood show tunes. Over time, some vocal songs were added. The station was playing four vocals per quarter-hour by the late 1970's. To help the station sound more contemporary, by the 1980s, more soft rock vocals were mixed in. By 1992, vocals made up half of the playlist. Beginning in January 1993, WPAT-FM had made the transition to soft adult contemporary. On October 1, 1994, the station moved to a mainstream adult contemporary format, purging most weekend specialty programming.

=== Changes in ownership ===
After being based in Newark, WPAT-AM-FM moved to studios on Church Street in Paterson, New Jersey. The stations later relocated to studios at the four-tower transmitter site of the AM station, at 1396 Broad Street in Clifton, New Jersey. WPAT-AM-FM were purchased by Capital Cities Communications in 1961.

In 1985, Capital Cities announced that it would buy the American Broadcasting Company (ABC), including its television and radio stations. As a result of Federal Communications Commission regulations at the time, it was decided that WPAT-AM-FM would be sold, because ABC already owned WABC and WPLJ in New York City (a broadcasting company could only own one AM and one FM station in each market). The WPAT radio stations were then sold to Park Communications, owned by Roy H. Park.

=== Switch to Spanish-language programming ===
In October 1995, Park Communications announced the sale of WPAT-FM to Spanish Broadcasting System (SBS), owners of WSKQ. The sale included the license and transmitter, and excluded real estate, sales contracts employment contracts, internal equipment, and leases. The building would be included in the separate sale of WPAT AM. On January 19, 1996, at 11:59 pm, WPAT-FM ceased being an English-language station when control was switched over SBS. WPAT-FM DJ Karen Carson did the last air shift for the station's adult contemporary format that day. Operations Director Ken Mackenzie gave a farewell speech right before the station ended its broadcast.

Immediately after the station signed off from Clifton, a new Spanish-language adult contemporary format signed on from SBS studios in Manhattan. The branding became "Suave 93.1" ("Smooth 93.1"). Eventually, on February 4, 1998, the station's branding was changed to "Amor 93.1" ("Love 93.1") and in January 2002, modified to "93.1 Amor" ("93.1 Love"). Over time, the station transitioned from Spanish AC to Spanish tropical music.
