= WOND =

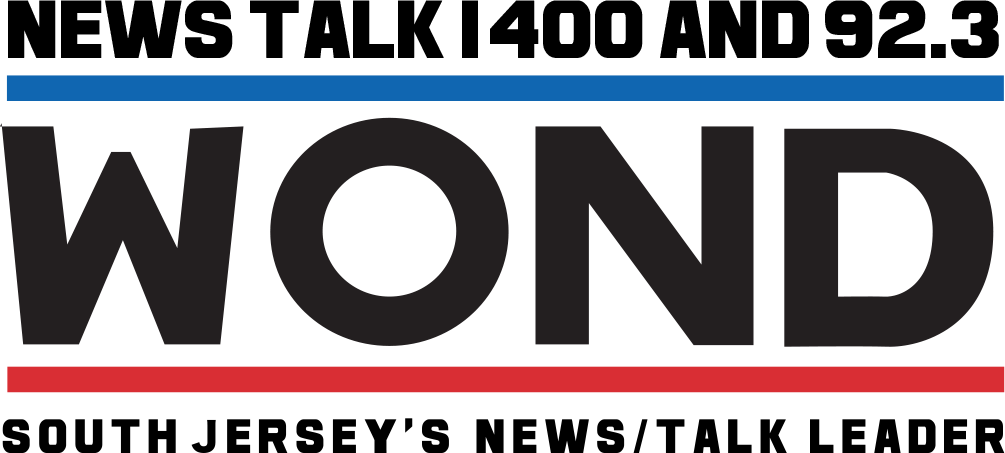
- Pleasantville, New Jersey; United States
- Broadcast area: Atlantic City; Jersey Shore
- Frequency: 1400 kHz
- Branding: News Talk 1400 WOND

Programming
- Format: Talk radio
- Affiliations: ABC News Radio; Compass Media Networks; Premiere Networks; Westwood One

Ownership
- Owner: Longport Media LLC.
- Sister stations: WBSS; WMGM; WTKU-FM

History
- First air date: July 1950

Technical information
- Licensing authority: FCC
- Facility ID: 61102
- Class: C
- Power: 1,000 watts unlimited
- Transmitter coordinates: 39°23′24.4″N 74°30′43.5″W
- Translator: 92.3 W223CO (Atlantic City)

Links
- Public license information: Public file; LMS
- Webcast: Listen live
- Website: wondradio.com

WOND (1400 AM) is a commercial radio station licensed to Pleasantville, New Jersey, and serving the Atlantic City radio market. It is owned by Longport Media and broadcasts a Conservative talk radio format. The station's studios and offices are located offshore in Linwood, New Jersey.

WOND is powered at 1,000 watts using a non-directional antenna, its transmitter is on Old Turnpike in Pleasantville, near the Atlantic City Expressway.

== Programming ==
On weekdays, WOND has local hosts during the day. Nights feature nationally syndicated programs, including: The Lars Larson Show, Coast to Coast AM with George Noory and America in The Morning.

Weekend syndicated hosts include Handel on The Law with Bill Handel, The Kim Komando Show and Sunday Night Live with Bill Cunningham. Most hours begin with an update from ABC News Radio.

== History ==
WOND is one of the Atlantic City market's legacy radio stations, first signing on the air in July 1950 as a network affiliate of ABC Radio.

In the 1960s, it was a Top 40 radio station, and its morning show was hosted by Bob Weems, one of the area's best-remembered DJs. The station was home to the long-running Pinky's Corner, hosted by Seymour "Pinky" Kravitz. The show called WOND home for 57 years before his retirement and death in 2015.

TV journalist Jessica Savitch began her career as a teen DJ on a show called Teen Talk in 1962. She used "Wild Weekend" as a theme song. She called herself "Wonda" for a short time. The station also launched the career of Tom Lamaine, long-time radio personality at WIP in Philadelphia and then at KYW-TV.

"First Lady of the Airwaves" Barbara Altman also broadcast her weekday call-in show Barbara Altman's Front Porch from WOND for decades.
