= WLOM (FM) =

Somers Point, New Jersey; United States
- Broadcast area: Ocean City
- Frequency: 90.5 MHz
- Branding: Hope FM

Programming
- Format: Defunct (was Christian radio)

Ownership
- Owner: Hope Christian Church of Marlton, Inc.

History
- First air date: October 22, 2000
- Last air date: July 26, 2021
- Former call signs: WXGN (1996–2020)

Technical information
- Licensing authority: FCC
- Facility ID: 32338
- Class: A
- ERP: 500 watts
- HAAT: 25 meters (82 ft)
- Transmitter coordinates: 39.280°N 74.576°W

Links
- Public license information: Public file; LMS

WLOM (90.5 FM) was a radio station licensed to the community of Somers Point, New Jersey.

The station went on the air with a Contemporary Christian Music format on October 22, 2000. As WXGN, original licensee Joy Broadcasting, Inc. was granted the original construction permit on February 9, 1996.

Effective August 17, 2020, Joy Broadcasting sold WXGN to Hope Christian Church of Marlton, who began broadcasting their "Hope FM" Christian radio format. The station changed its call sign to WLOM on August 24, 2020.

On July 26, 2021, Hope Christian Church surrendered the WLOM license for cancellation. Simultaneously, it filed to upgrade another Hope FM transmitter, WWFP in Brigantine.
