= WBSS (AM) =

- Pleasantville, New Jersey; United States
- Broadcast area: Atlantic; Cape May; Ocean
- Frequency: 1490 kHz
- Branding: El Jefe 1490

Programming
- Language: Spanish
- Format: Regional Mexican

Ownership
- Owner: Longport Media, LLC.
- Sister stations: WMGM-FM; WOND; WTKU-FM

History
- First air date: April 9, 1955
- Former call signs: WLDB (1955–1974); WUSS (1974–1997); WGYM (1997–2001); WUSS (2001–2006); WTKU (2006–2007); WTAA (2007–2010)

Technical information
- Licensing authority: FCC
- Facility ID: 30040
- Class: C
- Power: 400 watts
- Transmitter coordinates: 39°23′24″N 74°30′45″W

Links
- Public license information: Public file; LMS
- Webcast: Listen live
- Website: eljeferadio.com

WBSS (1490 AM), is a 400-watt radio station under the ownership of Longport Media, licensed to Pleasantville, New Jersey, and operating with a Regional Mexican format.

== History ==
The first station to broadcast on the 1490 frequency at the South Jersey shore was WBAB in Atlantic City, on January 31, 1940. WBAB was owned by the Press-Union Publishing Company, which owns The Atlantic Press and the Evening Union. WBAB went off the air in March 1951; and by April 9, 1955, had been replaced by WLDB (named for its owners, Leroy and Dorothy Bremmer). By the early 1970s WLDB was an NBC affiliate playing mostly country music.

In February 1974, WLDB was sold to The Atlantic Business and Development Corp., a group of local African-American businessmen. The call sign was changed to WUSS ("We're the United States of Soul!") and the station began to target the Black community with its programming. During its 20-year run as an Urban station, some of the WUSS personalities included Larry Hicks, Larry Hayes, Lee "Brown Sugar" Sherman, Ron Allen, Eddie O'Jay, Stan Brooks, Cooks Books, Jimmy Mack, Robert G Money, Kingsley Smith, Ellis B. "Bruce Ellis" Feaster, Steve Ross, with The Dude & The Dudess, Vernon Robbins, Cleo Rowe, and William K. Fisher Jr. WUSS was successful for a number of years under the name 1490 jAMs, but eventually fell victim to the general trend away from music on AM. After a short period of running satellite-delivered talk and oldies/blues programming, it went silent in the mid-1990s, then was sold to the owners of WOND.

The new ownership changed the station's city of license to Pleasantville and relocated its transmitter to the WOND site in that city. The call letters were changed to WGYM and a sports talk format was instituted. In 2001 the WUSS call sign returned and the format was changed to gospel; in the next few years, the station tried playing R&B oldies, then pop oldies (simulcasting WTKU-FM), went back to sports talk, then began simulcasting WTKU again (taking on the WTKU call letters in 2006). In the spring of 2007, the call sign was changed to WTAA and the station began to run a progressive talk radio format, mostly fed from the Air America Radio network. It also carried Imus in the Morning.

On October 9, 2008, the talk format was abandoned in favor of Bustos Media's satellite-driven regional Mexican format. The following February, WTAA again changed its format to tropical music, simulcast from WBON in Westhampton, New York. The callsign changed to WBSS in January 2010.

On August 12, 2011, the station switched to a simulcast of WOND. The station changed once more on September 30, 2011, when WBSS began to simulcast Philadelphia sports radio station WIP-FM, branded as "WIP at the Beach".

WBSS went off the air at the time of Hurricane Sandy. By late February 2013 it had resumed broadcasting. The station broadcast WOND, until April 3, 2013, the station returned to a simulcast of WTKU.

On August 5, 2019, WBSS became one of the first terrestrial radio stations in the country dedicated entirely to sports betting, teaming up with The BetR Network, as the station re-branded as "Sports Betting Radio". The station aired programming from the VSIN network, along with several hours of local programming and sports updates."

On June 28, 2024, the station flipped from sports betting radio to Regional Mexican, branded as "El Jefe 1490".
