= WPUR =

Coordinates: 39.378444°N 74.447639°W

- Atlantic City, New Jersey; United States
- Broadcast area: Atlantic City, New Jersey
- Frequency: 107.3 MHz
- Branding: Cat Country 107.3

Programming
- Format: Country
- Affiliations: Compass Media Networks; Westwood One

Ownership
- Owner: Townsquare Media; (Townsquare License, LLC)
- Sister stations: WENJ, WFPG, WPGG, WSJO

History
- First air date: February 28, 1998
- Call sign meaning: Purr

Technical information
- Licensing authority: FCC
- Facility ID: 54894
- Class: B1
- ERP: 25,000 watts
- HAAT: 94 meters (308 feet)

Links
- Public license information: Public file; LMS
- Webcast: Listen Live
- Website: catcountry1073.com

WPUR (107.3 FM) is a country music formatted radio station in Atlantic City, New Jersey. WPUR is more commonly known as "Cat Country 107.3". Its transmitter is located in Atlantic City, while studios are in Northfield, New Jersey.

== History ==
The construction permit for a new station on 107.3 in Atlantic City, New Jersey, was granted the random WZZP call sign on March 17, 1997. It went on the air on February 28, 1998, with a mix of classic rock, oldies, and newer songs. This test broadcast was erratic and mostly heard on weekends through March 17, 1998. Chief engineer Tom McNally was the first voice heard on the station, as a "conducting equipment tests" message aired between the music.

On April 9 and 10, 1998, WZZP began broadcasting a mix of country songs. Later on April 10 and into April 11, the station played "Tubthumping" by Chumbawamba over and over. Another stunt format aired from April 12 to April 14, this time with all classic rock songs as "ZZ-107". From April 14 to April 17, CHR was featured with IDs only saying "107.3". This was expanded upon from April 17 to April 25, when more CHR songs were added to the playlist and the station's name shifted to "ZZ-107 The Zipper".

On April 25, 1998, "Fun 107" debuted with a rhythmic CHR format, which was easy to do since WZZP's sister station, at the time, in New Bedford, Massachusetts, was "Fun 107" WFHN. Most people thought this was going to be the final format, but it was just another long drawn-out stunt that ultimately lasted for a little over two months.

At 3 p.m. on June 29, 1998, the real format and name finally debuted: "Cat Country 107.3", with "Fancy" by Reba McEntire as the station's first song. The call letters officially changed to WPUR on July 20, 1998.

== Ownership ==
Spring Broadcasting, LLC, purchased the construction permit for 107.3 in Atlantic City from Radio-Vision II in the late 1990s. In November 1999, Citadel Communications entered the Atlantic City market as it purchased Spring Broadcasting. In July 2001, Citadel Communications sold WPUR and its Atlantic City sister stations to newly formed Millennium Radio Group for $19.4 million. In 2011, Millennium's radio stations were turned over to Townsquare Media.

== Positioning ==
WPUR positions itself as "Cat Country 107.3", "#1 for new country". Originally, WPUR was positioned as "South Jersey's Hot New Country" and later "Continuous Country Favorites". WPUR currently uses the 360 Country imaging service from TM Studios. Carter Davis served as the station's voiceover talent for years. All of Cat Country 107.3's previous jingle packages came from Reelworld.

== Technical ==
WPUR is a class B1 FM radio station, operating with 25,000 watts ERP from an antenna 94 meters (308 ft) high (HAAT) on the WFPG tower in Atlantic City. Until early 2008, WPUR's antenna was located on the roof of the Trump Taj Mahal casino on the Atlantic City boardwalk.

WPUR had a severe null in its signal over land until WSNJ-FM 107.7 Bridgeton, New Jersey, went off the air in February 2004. When WSNJ-FM went off the air, WPUR was able to bring a full 25,000-watt ERP signal over land.

== Charity work ==
WPUR supports local non-profit organizations throughout South Jersey. In addition, since 2000, WPUR has held annual two-day radiothons for St. Jude Children's Research Hospital, raising over $1,000,000, and also holds a yearly quest for One Million Pennies for St. Jude.
