= WKOE =

- North Cape May, New Jersey; United States
- Broadcast area: Cape May County, New Jersey
- Frequency: 106.3 MHz
- Branding: 106.3 Coast Country

Programming
- Format: Country
- Affiliations: Compass Media Networks

Ownership
- Owner: Robert Maschio and Scott Wahl; (Coastal Broadcasting Systems, Inc.)
- Sister stations: WCZT

History
- First air date: July 30, 1992 (as WIFB at 106.7)
- Former call signs: WIFB (1992–1993); WJNN (1993–2001); WDOX (2001–2005); WSJQ (2005–2008); WKOE (2008–2010); WFNE (2010–2012); WJSE (2012–2024)
- Former frequencies: 106.7 MHz (1992–2011)

Technical information
- Licensing authority: FCC
- Facility ID: 72113
- Class: A
- ERP: 5,400 watts
- HAAT: 105.4 meters (346 ft)
- Transmitter coordinates: 39°7′47.8″N 74°47′16.1″W

Links
- Public license information: Public file; LMS
- Webcast: Listen live
- Website: 1063coastcountry.com

WKOE (106.3 FM, "106.3 Coast Country") is a radio station broadcasting a country music format. Licensed to the North Cape May section of Lower Township, Cape May County, New Jersey, United States, the station serves the Cape May–Atlantic City radio market. WKOE also serves coastal Delaware and the Ocean City, Maryland, area as a secondary market.

== History ==
The station went on the air as WIFB at 106.7 MHz on July 30, 1992. On April 1, 1993, the station changed to a local news/talk format as WJNN; on June 8, 2001, to alternative rock as WDOX; and on April 14, 2005, to Top 40/CHR under the WSJQ call letters.

On September 18, 2008, WSJQ began stunting, playing humorous clips from television shows such as South Park informing listeners that WSJQ was no more. Several days later, the station changed its call sign to WKOE, branding to "Coast Country 106.7", and format to country music. The station also began broadcast of the John Boy and Billy show. The station changed to an oldies format, adopting the WFNE call sign on April 1, 2010.

On December 29, 2011, the station moved to 106.3, and increased its transmitting power from 3,000 watts to 6,000 watts along with moving to a new tower five miles east-north east to Wildwood, New Jersey, and segueing to a classic hits format as "Fun 106.3". This new power and location combination would allow the 106.3 signal to be heard from Millville in Cumberland County in the west to Beach Haven in Ocean County to the north and Ocean City, Maryland, to the south.

On Friday, August 31, 2012, at midnight, WFNE returned to alternative rock, under the "WJSE Rocks" branding.

After a five-year stint with alternative rock, WJSE reverted to classic hits as "106.3 The Shore" on Monday, April 17, 2017. In 2019, "106.3 The Shore" shifted from a classic hits-based playlist to an oldies playlist, dropping all 1980s music while adding more music from the 1950s and 1960s, and changing their slogan from "South Jersey's Greatest Hits" to "South Jersey's Greatest Hits of the 50s, 60s and 70s".

Sometime between October 30 and November 2, 2020, at midnight, WJSE dropped the oldies format and reverted to alternative rock as "106.3 WJSE, The Rock Alternative". On July 31, 2023, WJSE rebranded as "Planet 106.3".

On May 20, 2024, the station would revert back to the country music format, once again using the "Coast Country" brand and applying to also revert to the station's former WKOE call letters.
