= WXGN-LP =

- Ocean City, New Jersey; United States
- Frequency: 92.7 MHz

Programming
- Format: Christian rock

Ownership
- Owner: Joy Broadcasting, Inc.

History
- Former call signs: WLOM-LP (2003–2020)

Technical information
- Licensing authority: FCC
- Facility ID: 135683
- Class: L1
- ERP: 94 watts
- HAAT: 30.7 meters (101 ft)
- Transmitter coordinates: 39°16′47.00″N 74°34′30.00″W

Links
- Public license information: LMS
- Webcast: Listen Live
- Website: truththatrocks.com

WXGN-LP (92.7 FM, "Truth That Rocks") is a radio station broadcasting a Christian radio format. Licensed to serve Ocean City, New Jersey, United States, the station is currently owned by Joy Broadcasting, Inc.
