= WFJS =

- Trenton, New Jersey; United States
- Broadcast area: Mercer County, New Jersey
- Frequency: 1260 kHz
- Branding: Domestic Church Media

Programming
- Format: Religious (Catholic)
- Affiliations: EWTN Radio

Ownership
- Owner: Domestic Church Media Foundation

History
- First air date: January 20, 1947
- Former call signs: WBUD (1947–1978); WTRT (1978–1980); WKXW (1980–1981); WBUD (1981–2008)
- Former frequencies: 1490 kHz (1947–1953)
- Call sign meaning: Fulton J. Sheen (noted archbishop)

Technical information
- Licensing authority: FCC
- Facility ID: 53443
- Class: B
- Power: 5,900 watts (day); 2,500 watts (night)
- Transmitter coordinates: 40°15′56.39″N 74°45′25.58″W

Links
- Public license information: Public file; LMS
- Webcast: Listen live
- Website: domesticchurchmedia.org

WFJS (1260 AM) is a radio station broadcasting a religious radio format, focusing on the Catholic Church and carrying EWTN Radio Network programs. The station is owned by the Domestic Church Media Foundation, a Catholic-based organization in Trenton, New Jersey. Programming is simulcast on WFJS-FM (89.3) in Freehold, New Jersey, as well as WGYM (1580 AM) in the Atlantic City area and WSMJ (91.9 FM) in North Wildwood.

By day, WFJS is powered at 5,900 watts. To protect other stations on 1260 AM from interference, at night it reduces power to 2,500 watts. It uses a directional antenna with a four-tower array. The transmitter is on Ewingville Road in Ewing Township, New Jersey.

== History ==
=== Early years ===
The station signed on the air on January 20, 1947, as WBUD. It was licensed to Morrisville, Pennsylvania, broadcasting at 1490 kHz. In 1952, WBUD moved to its current frequency of 1260 kHz as a Trenton-licensed station. During a period in the late 1970s, the station held the call sign WTRT. On May 29, 1980, the station adopted the call letters WKXW. It reverted to the original call sign WBUD on September 1, 1981, and kept those call letters until 2008.

In the early 1970s, WBUD broadcast a Top 40 format. In 1975, the station became an all-news outlet, carrying the NBC News and Information Service. When that service was discontinued in 1977, WBUD returned to music programming. By the late 1990s, WBUD was airing oldies music as "Great Gold Radio".

=== Standards and sports ===
In February 2006, WBUD switched to ABC Radio's "Unforgettable Favorites" satellite feed, airing a soft oldies/adult standards format. Despite Unforgettable merging with the "Timeless" Radio Network, WBUD maintained its nostalgia playlist for two years.

On March 31, 2008, the station switched to a sports radio format, becoming a network affiliate of Fox Sports Radio. The station aired Fox Sports all day except in afternoons, when it aired Premiere's Jim Rome Show and local programming.

=== Catholic radio ===
The Millennium Radio Group, then WBUD's owner, announced on July 25, 2008, that the station would be sold. The buyer was the Domestic Church Media Foundation, founded by New Jersey native, Jim Manfredonia. The station would drop Fox Sports Radio, switching to Catholic religious programming, mainly from EWTN. The sale was completed on September 10, 2008.

On September 14, 2008, WBUD had its final day of broadcasting, featuring the station's automated "Great Gold" oldies format, as well as Jack Pinto's Sunday Sinatra program, live in the studio. The station returned to Fox Sports at 2 p.m. after playing its final song, "Yesterday's Gone", by Chad & Jeremy.

On September 15, 2008, WBUD officially flipped to a Catholic-based religious format, as "Domestic Church Catholic Radio". On September 22, 2008, the station changed its call letters to WFJS, named after Fulton J. Sheen, an archbishop who had used broadcasting (particularly television) to deliver the message about the Catholic faith. The station's studios were also renamed as "The Archbishop Fulton J. Sheen Center for Media Evangelization".

=== Power increase ===
In August 2012, WFJS was granted a construction permit by the Federal Communications Commission to increase its daytime power to 5,900 watts. It also added a fourth tower to its array to modify its daytime directional pattern.

The sign-off of station WNWK in Newark, Delaware, which also broadcast on 1260 AM, freed WFJS from an obligation to minimize interference to that station. The new directional pattern improves WFJS's daytime signal to the south and southwest. No change was made to the station's nighttime power or pattern.

== Simulcasts ==
In May 2011, the Domestic Church Media Foundation was granted a license for WFJS-FM on 89.3 FM in Freehold, New Jersey. The station simulcasts 1260 WFJS.

Call sign	Frequency	City of license	FID	Power (W)	ERP (W)	HAAT	Class	Transmitter coordinates	FCC info
WFJS-FM	89.3 FM	Freehold, New Jersey	174562	—	15,000	50 m (160 ft)	B1	40°16′27″N 74°9′48.8″W	LMS
WGYM	1580 AM	Hammonton, New Jersey	61110	1,000 daytime; 6 nighttime	—	—	C	39°37′33.42″N 74°47′42.59″W	LMS
WSMJ	91.9 FM	North Wildwood, New Jersey	174695	—	730	280 m (920 ft)	A	39°2′58″N 74°51′13″W	LMS
