= WWFP =

Coordinates: 39°22′46″N 74°25′45″W

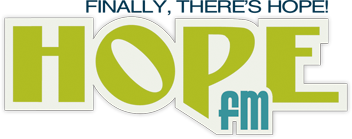
- Brigantine, New Jersey; United States
- Broadcast area: Atlantic City, New Jersey
- Frequency: 90.5 MHz
- Branding: Hope FM

Programming
- Format: Christian

Ownership
- Owner: Hope Christian Church of Marlton, Inc.
- Sister stations: WRSM, WVBV, WZBL, WZWG

History
- First air date: 2006

Technical information
- Licensing authority: FCC
- Facility ID: 122933
- Class: A
- ERP: 77 watts
- HAAT: 93.6 meters (307 ft)

Links
- Public license information: Public file; LMS
- Webcast: Listen Live
- Website: www.hopefm.net

WWFP (90.5 FM) is a non-commercial Christian radio station based in Brigantine, New Jersey. It is owned by Hope Christian Church of Marlton, Inc.. It serves the general Atlantic City metro area. The station's main transmitter is located atop the Golden Nugget casino and hotel in Atlantic City.

== History ==
The station began broadcasting in 2006, and was owned by CSN International. In 2008, CSN International sold WWFP, along with a number of other stations, to Calvary Radio Network, Inc. These stations were sold to Calvary Chapel Costa Mesa later that year. In 2009, the station was sold to Hope Christian Church of Marlton for $50,000.
