= WJLK (AM) =

- Lakewood Township, New Jersey; United States
- Broadcast area: Monmouth–Ocean County, New Jersey
- Frequency: 1160 kHz
- Branding: Beach Radio

Programming
- Format: Oldies

Ownership
- Owner: Townsquare Media; (Townsquare License, LLC)
- Sister stations: WCHR-FM; WJLK-FM; WOBM; WOBM-FM

History
- First air date: November 20, 1970; 55 years ago
- Former call signs: WHLW (1970–1981); WOBM (1981–2023)
- Former frequencies: 1170 kHz (1970–1988)
- Call sign meaning: derived from WJLK-FM

Technical information
- Licensing authority: FCC
- Facility ID: 49295
- Class: B
- Power: 5,000 watts (day); 8,900 watts (night)
- Transmitter coordinates: 40°8′9.4″N 74°13′46.5″W
- Translator: 104.1 W281CK (Lakewood Township)

Links
- Public license information: Public file; LMS
- Webcast: Listen live
- Website: mybeachradio.com

WJLK (1160 kHz) is an AM radio station licensed to Lakewood Township, New Jersey, broadcasting an oldies format. The station is owned by Townsquare Media and serves the Monmouth County area.

== History ==
The station signed on November 20, 1970, as a daytime-only operation on 1170 kHz, using the call letters WHLW (for Howell and Lakewood Townships). Early in its existence, it became a top 40 station calling itself 11-7 Radio, featuring such disc jockeys as John Collure, Paul Irwin, Jack Tracksler, Charlie Roberts, Jay Sorensen, and Joey Reynolds. The station became WOBM in 1981, and in early 1988, moved to the 1160 frequency and became a 24-hour operation. At the time, the station was owned by North Shore Broadcasting Partners, which was affiliated with WOBM-FM's ownership group, Seashore Broadcasting.

During the late 1980s, WOBM was known as "1160 AM Star Country" and featured a country music format and New York Mets baseball games. Local airstaff at the time included general manager Kevin Buckelew, (son of co-owner Joseph Buckelew and known on-air as Kevin Carr), Tom Maciazak, Ava Holly and Kevin Hodge, although most of the programming was satellite-delivered. The station also simulcast Bob Levy's "Topic A" program on Sunday mornings from the sister FM station. Levy had originated the program while general manager of WOBM-AM-FM and continued the program after retiring from the position in the late 1980s. At the time, programming and ad sales operations emanated from WOBM's studios and transmitter site at 46 Clayton Road in Howell Township, just off Route 9.

In the 1990s, WOBM adopted an MOR format, and added Bob Levy and his wife Marianne as local morning hosts. Outside of the local morning show, WOBM featured Dial Global's syndicated adult standards format, known on-air by the handle America's Best Music.

On September 3, 2010, WOBM changed its format and branding to "Good Time Oldies", and began simulcasting on 1310 WADB.

The WOBM News/Townsquare Media News team includes bureau chief Thomas Mongelli and morning anchor Dianne DeOliveira.

On May 19, 2014, WOBM changed its format from oldies to news/talk. On January 3, 2017, WOBM returned to an oldies format, branded as "Beach Radio".

On December 12, 2019, the station's translator at 93.5 signed off and on December 29, 2019, its new translator on 104.1 signed on.

On February 1, 2022, at 10 am, after playing "Thunder Road" by Bruce Springsteen, WOBM changed its format from oldies to country, branded as "Cat Country 96.7/104.1", with the first song being "Cold as You" by Luke Combs. The "Cat Country" branding was shared with Atlantic City sister station WPUR.

On July 10, 2023, WOBM dropped the country music format and began simulcasting the hot adult contemporary programming of WJLK, expanding its coverage to northern Ocean County; the format change also ended the simulcast with WADB, which began simulcasting WOBM-FM. The station's call sign was changed to WJLK on July 21, 2023.

WJLK AM went silent in March 2025. The shutdown was part of a series of closures of under-performing Townsquare Media stations; WOBM AM, the former WADB, also concurrently suspended operations. Townsquare COO Erik Hellum told trade publication Inside Radio that the stations were closed because high expenses related to their tower leases and utilities had led to financial losses.
