= WOBM (AM) =

Radio station in Asbury Park, New Jersey

- Asbury Park, New Jersey; United States
- Broadcast area: Ocean; Burlington; Monmouth
- Frequency: 1310 kHz
- Branding: Beach Radio

Programming
- Format: Oldies

Ownership
- Owner: Townsquare Media; (Townsquare License, LLC)
- Sister stations: WCHR-FM; WJLK; WJLK-FM; WOBM-FM

History
- First air date: 1926
- Former call signs: WDWM (1926–1928); WCAP (1928–1950); WJLK (1950–1996); WADB (1996–2008); WBUD (2008–2009); WADB (2009–2023)
- Call sign meaning: Ocean, Burlington, Monmouth

Technical information
- Licensing authority: FCC
- Facility ID: 14895
- Class: B
- Power: 2,500 watts (day); 1,000 watts (night)
- Transmitter coordinates: 40°13′47.4″N 74°5′25.5″W
- Translator: 96.7 W244EE (Asbury Park)

Links
- Public license information: Public file; LMS
- Webcast: Listen live
- Website: mybeachradio.com

WOBM (1310 kHz) is an Oldies AM radio station serving southern Monmouth and northern Ocean County, New Jersey. Licensed to Asbury Park, its studios are located in Toms River and its transmitter is in Tinton Falls. The station is owned by Townsquare Media.

== History ==
The station began in 1926 as WDWM in Newark; it moved to Asbury Park as WCAP (for City of Asbury Park) in 1928. In 1950, the station was purchased by the Asbury Park Press and renamed WJLK as a sister station to WJLK-FM, which the newspaper placed on the air on November 20, 1947. The stations emphasized news coverage, using the paper's resources to produce 15-minute newscasts at the top of each hour, and a wide variety of programs including various types of music, talk and interviews.

In 1989, the newspaper sold the two stations to Devlin and Ferrari Broadcasting Company of New York for $12.5 million. The ownership changed again and during the time between the sale by the Press and the present day, various formats were tried, including oldies, big band music and country.

The station held the WJLK call sign until November 4, 1996, and was called WADB from that date until September 18, 2008.

On June 25, 2007, WADB became a full-time ESPN Deportes Radio affiliate, broadcasting sports programming in Spanish. Six months later, in January 2008, it became a Fox Sports Radio affiliate and adopted the slogan "National Sports with a Shore View". WADB mostly broadcast Fox Sports Radio programming. The station also broadcasts Lakewood BlueClaws minor league baseball along with sister station WOBM.

Millennium Radio renamed the station WBUD on September 18, 2008, before changing the name back to WADB on June 4, 2009.

On September 3, 2010, WADB changed its format to oldies, simulcasting WOBM. Both stations continue to broadcast Lakewood BlueClaws minor league baseball and play-by-play of high school sports. On May 19, 2014, WADB changed its format news/talk. On January 3, 2017, WADB returned to an oldies format, branded as "Beach Radio".

On February 1, 2022, at 10 am, after playing "Thunder Road" by Bruce Springsteen, WADB changed its format from oldies to country, branded as "Cat Country 96.7/104.1", with the first song being "Cold as You" by Luke Combs. The "Cat Country" branding was shared with Atlantic City sister station WPUR.

On July 10, 2023, WADB dropped the country format and began simulcasting the adult contemporary format of WOBM-FM, expanding that station's coverage of Monmouth County; the format change also ended the simulcast with WOBM AM, which began simulcasting WJLK. The "Cat Country Jersey Shore" website was then redirected to the WPUR website. WADB's call sign was changed to WOBM on July 31, 2023.

WOBM AM went silent in March 2025. The shutdown was part of a series of closures of under-performing Townsquare Media stations; WJLK AM, the former WOBM, also concurrently suspended operations. Townsquare COO Erik Hellum told trade publication Inside Radio that the stations were closed because high expenses related to their tower leases and utilities had led to financial losses.

In March 2026, WOBM and translator W244EE (96.7 FM) returned to the air with the "Beach Radio" oldies format simulcast with WJLK.
