= Maryland Terrapins =

Intercollegiate sports teams of the University of Maryland

- University: University of Maryland, College Park
- Nickname: Terps
- NCAA: Division I (FBS)
- Conference: Big Ten Conference
- Athletic director: James E. Smith
- Location: College Park, Maryland
- Varsity teams: 20 (8 men's and 12 women's)
- Football stadium: SECU Stadium
- Basketball arena: XFINITY Center
- Baseball stadium: Bob "Turtle" Smith Stadium
- Softball stadium: Maryland Softball Stadium
- Soccer stadium: Ludwig Field
- Lacrosse stadium: SECU Stadium
- Other venues: Jones-Hill House
- Colors: Red, white, black, and gold
- Mascot: Testudo
- Fight song: "Maryland Fight Song", "Maryland Victory Song"
- Website: umterps.com
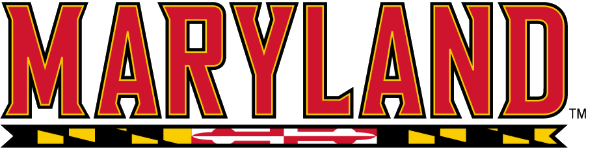

The Maryland Terrapins, commonly referred to as the Terps, consist of 20 men's and women's varsity intercollegiate athletic teams that represent the University of Maryland, College Park, in National Collegiate Athletic Association (NCAA) Division I competition. Maryland was a founding member of the Southern Conference in 1921, a founding member of the Atlantic Coast Conference in 1952, and a member of the Big Ten Conference since 2014.

The nickname was coined in 1932 by Harry C. "Curley" Byrd, then the school's football coach and later the school's president. Previously, Maryland teams were known as the "Old Liners"—a reference to the state's nickname, "The Old Line State". However, the school newspaper, The Diamondback, wanted a better nickname. Byrd thought "Terrapins" was a good choice because of the diamondback terrapins native to the Chesapeake Bay region. Byrd's hometown of Crisfield was famous for the number of terrapins along its shores. The school mascot is an anthropomorphic turtle named "Testudo". The official team colors are red, white, black, and gold, derived from the Maryland state flag. It is the only NCAA school to have four official school colors. On July 1, 2014, the Terrapins became members of the Big Ten Conference following 62 years of membership in the Atlantic Coast Conference. The university currently sponsors varsity athletic teams in 20 men's and women's sports, which compete at the NCAA Division I level.

== History ==
The University of Maryland, College Park was established in 1856 as Maryland Agricultural College. Baseball and football were played on the campus as early as the Civil War era. It was renamed Maryland State College in 1916, and in 1920, merged with the state's professional schools in Baltimore to become the University of Maryland. Between 1921 and 1953, the university was a member of the Southern Conference.

Longstanding tensions within the Southern Conference culminated in 1951, when it passed a ban on participation in bowl games midway through the football season. At the end of the regular season, both Maryland and Clemson were invited and accepted invitations to postseason bowl games. The Southern Conference sanctioned the two schools with a one-year probation in which they could not schedule any football games against conference opponents. On May 8, 1953, Maryland became a founding member of the Atlantic Coast Conference (ACC) when it and six other schools voted to split from the Southern Conference.

As a result of a committee's recommendation to cut athletics costs, funding for eight teams was eliminated on November 21, 2011, a move supported by University President Wallace Loh. However, the president also showed support for a "Save the Programs Campaign", which gave the teams a chance to raise eight years of total program costs by June 30, 2012. The affected teams were men's cross country, indoor track, and outdoor track, men's swimming and diving, men's tennis, women's acrobatics and tumbling, women's swimming and diving, and women's water polo. On July 1, 2012, the university officially cut seven of those teams. The men's outdoor track team raised $888,000 of a target amount of $940,000, which was deemed sufficient to avoid elimination.

On November 19, 2012, the University of Maryland's Board of Regents voted to withdraw from the ACC to join the Big Ten Conference effective July 1, 2014.

== Sports sponsored ==
Men's sports	Women's sports
Baseball	Basketball
Basketball	Cross country
Football	Field hockey
Golf	Golf
Lacrosse	Gymnastics
Soccer	Lacrosse
Track and field	Soccer
Wrestling	Softball
	Tennis
	Track and field^{†}
	Volleyball
† – Track and field includes both indoor and outdoor.

The University of Maryland currently offers 20 varsity teams: 8 men's and 12 women's.

=== Baseball ===
- NCAA Tournament Regional Champions: 2014, 2015
- NCAA Tournament Appearances: 1965, 1970, 1971, 2014, 2015, 2017
- Conference Champions: 1936, 1965, 1970, 1971, 2022
- Conference Tournament Champions: 2023

=== Men's basketball ===
Burton Shipley was Maryland's first and longest serving basketball coach, but his lengthy tenure from 1923 to 1947 was described as "remarkably quiet". At that time, the sport was not widely popular in the mid-Atlantic region and football and boxing were much better drawing spectator sports on the Maryland campus. To capitalize on the popularity, basketball games at Ritchie Coliseum were held as doubleheaders with boxing matches for 26 years. Bud Millikan became head coach in 1950 and soon led Maryland to consistent respectability within the Southern Conference. Defensive point guard Gene Shue averaged 22 points per game and his scoring record stood for two decades. In 1955, the small Ritchie Coliseum was replaced by; games were moved to the larger Cole Field House, centrally located on campus, and when Maryland became a member of the Atlantic Coast Conference (ACC), the fanbase rapidly expanded. Millikan's tenure culminated in 1958 when Maryland won its first Atlantic Coast Conference tournament championship and advanced to the Elite Eight in the NCAA tournament.

Big Ten logo in Maryland's colors

In 1969, Lefty Driesell was hired by the University of Maryland. Drisell led the Terrapins to eight NCAA Tournament appearances, a National Invitation Tournament championship, two Atlantic Coast Conference regular-season championships, and one Atlantic Coast Conference tournament championship. Maryland also attained a No. 2 Associated Press ranking during four consecutive seasons from 1972 to 1976.

Driesell coached the Maryland Terrapins from 1969 to 1986. During his tenure, he successfully recruited numerous exceptional players, including Tom McMillen, Len Elmore, John Lucas, Albert King, Buck Williams, and Len Bias.

At Maryland, Driesell began the now nationwide tradition of Midnight Madness. According to longstanding NCAA rules, college basketball teams were not permitted to begin practices until October 15. Driesell traditionally began the first practice with a requirement that his players run one mile in six minutes, but found that the players were too fatigued to practice effectively immediately afterwards. At 12:03 a.m. on October 15, 1971, Driesell held a one-mile run at the track around Byrd Stadium, where a crowd of 1,000 fans had gathered after learning of the unorthodox practice session. The event soon became a tradition to build excitement for the basketball team's upcoming season. Midnight Madness has been adopted by many national programs such as UNC, Kansas, Kentucky, Michigan State and Duke.

In 1972, Maryland defeated Niagara, 100–69, to secure the National Invitation Tournament championship. Driesell said that the season attained the three goals he had set for the program at the time of his hiring: "national prominence", "national ranking", and "a national championship".

In the 1974 ACC men's basketball tournament, Maryland was defeated by North Carolina State University in overtime, 103–100. Many consider it to be one of the greatest college basketball games of all time. North Carolina State University eventually went on to win the 1974 National Championship. Maryland finished No. 4 in the final Associated Press poll that season, prompting the NCAA to make a landmark decision in 1975. The NCAA tournament committee expanded the field from 32 to 48 teams, which opened the door for more than one team from a conference.

In 1984, Driesell led the team to the school's second ACC Tournament Championship. In December 1985, the university gave Driesell a ten-year contract extension. Earlier that same year, Driesell was made an Honorary M Club member. He ended his career at Maryland with a 348–159 overall record. His winning percentage of .686 is the best ever for a Maryland coach.

Gary Williams became head coach in 1989, bringing Maryland back to national prominence following difficult years. By March 2010, Williams was the fifth-winningest active coach in the country and the third-winningest coach all-time in the ACC (behind only Dean Smith and Mike Krzyzewski). In 2002, Williams led the Terrapins to the program's first national championship, defeating Indiana, 64–52. Williams retired in May 2011 and Mark Turgeon was hired from Texas A&M to be his successor.

- NCAA National Champions: 2002
- NCAA Final Fours: 2001, 2002
- NCAA Tournament appearances: 1958, 1973, 1975, 1980, 1981, 1983 - 1986, 1994 - 2004, 2007, 2009, 2010, 2015, 2016, 2017, 2019, 2021
- Conference Champions: 1932, 1975, 1980, 1995, 2002, 2010, 2020
- Conference Tournament Champions: 1931, 1958, 1984, 2004

=== Women's basketball ===
Maryland Terrapins women's basketball has become one of the most celebrated sports on campus, due to significant success in the Brenda Frese era. After experiencing a period of national prominence under head coach, Chris Weller in the 1980s, including a pair of trips to the Final Four in 1982 and 1989, the Maryland Terrapins reached their full potential in 2006, winning the NCAA National Championship. In the ACC, Maryland was regularly a threat to win regular season and conference tournament championships, doing so on five and ten occasions, respectively. Since joining the Big Ten in the 2014–2015 season, Maryland has featured in every Big Ten tournament Championship game (as of 2021), winning five titles, and has won six of seven regular season championships.

- NCAA National Champions: 2006
- NCAA/AIAW Final Fours: 1978, 1982, 1989, 2006, 2014, 2015
- NCAA/AIAW Tournament Appearances: 1978 - 1984, 1986, 1988 - 1993, 1997, 2001, 2004 - 2009, 2011 - 2019, 2021
- Conference Champions: 1979, 1982, 1988, 1989, 2009, 2015 - 2017, 2019–2021
- Conference Tournament Champions: 1978, 1979, 1981 - 1983, 1986, 1988, 1989, 2009, 2012, 2015 - 2017, 2020, 2021

=== Field hockey ===
The Maryland Terrapins field hockey team is among the most accomplished field hockey programs in the country, and have won a total of eight NCAA national championships and 16 conference championships (10 in the ACC and 6 in the Big Ten).

- NCAA National Champions: 1987, 1993, 1999, 2005, 2006, 2008, 2010, 2011
- NCAA Final Fours: 1987, 1991, 1993, 1995, 1999 - 2001, 2003 - 2006, 2008 - 2013, 2017, 2018, 2021, 2022
- NCAA Tournament Appearances: 1978 - 1984, 1986, 1988 - 1993, 1997, 2001, 2004 - 2019, 2021, 2022
- Conference Champions: 1992, 1998 - 2000, 2001, 2005, 2008 - 2010, 2013 - 2016, 2018, 2019, 2022

=== Football ===
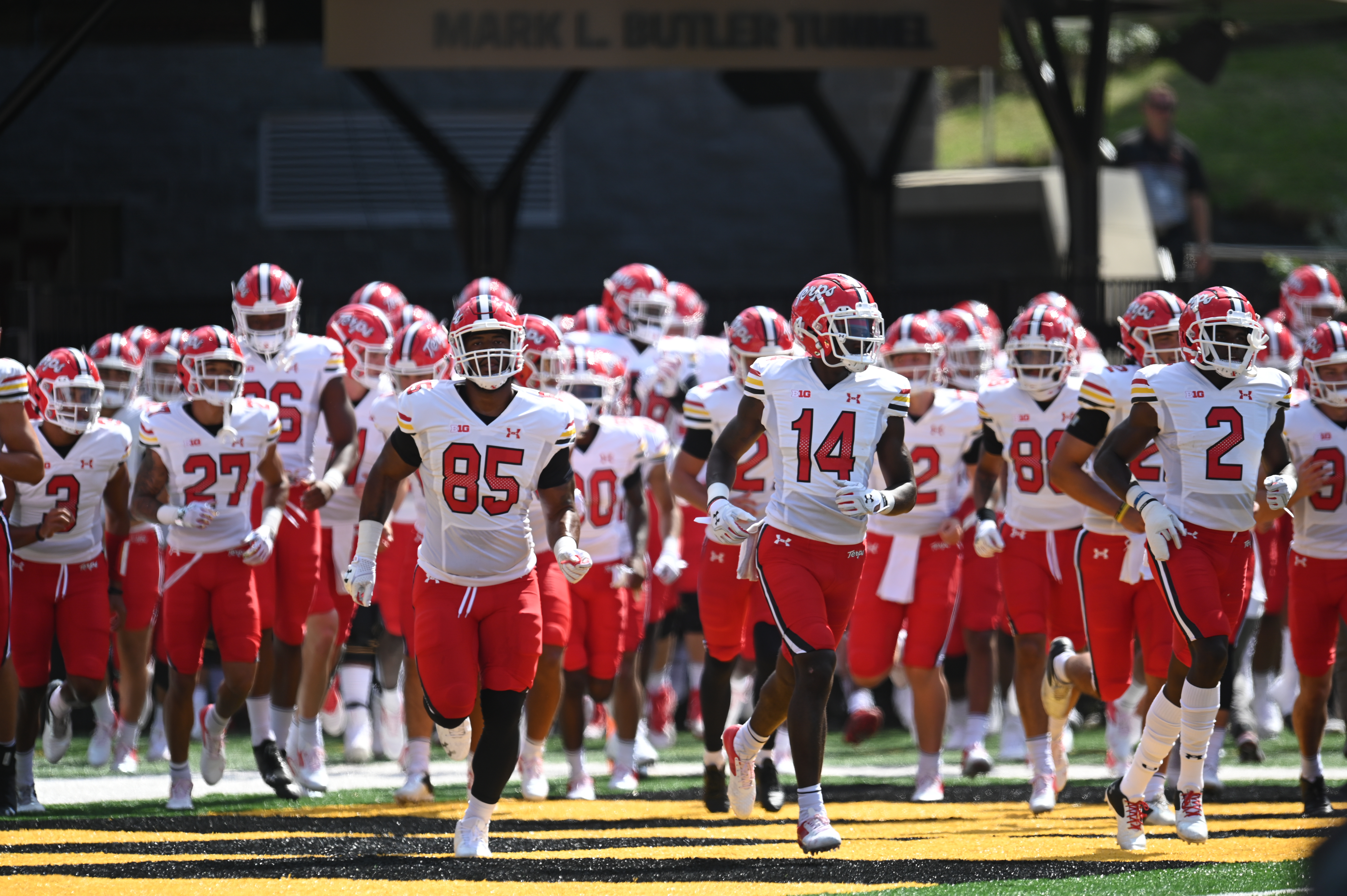
The Maryland football team takes the field prior to a game in 2021

An unofficial football team composed of Maryland Agricultural College students played games against local high schools in 1890 and 1891. The following year, the school lent its support, which marked the official establishment of the Maryland football program in 1892. The football team has continued to the present day with the exception of a brief hiatus in 1895. In 1894, former Maryland coach and player William W. Skinner spearheaded the formation of the Maryland Intercollegiate Football Association, which served to award the state football championship. Maryland hired D. John Markey as its first paid football coach in 1902. H. C. "Curley" Byrd, who eventually served as the university president from 1936 to 1953, began his playing career on the team in 1905. In 1911, Byrd was appointed as the head football coach, and he served in that position through 1934. During his tenure, Byrd was instrumental in growing support of the program, and in 1915 successfully requisitioned funding for the school's first stadium. In his position as university president, he was also responsible for building the school's current football facility, Maryland Stadium.

In 1945, Paul "Bear" Bryant began his long and distinguished career as a head football coach at the University of Maryland. The following year, he was replaced by Jim Tatum, a pioneer of the split T. Maryland football achieved its greatest success under Tatum, who compiled a 73–15–4 record without a single losing season, and to date, he remains the winningest Maryland coach of the modern era. NCAA recognized selectors awarded Maryland the national football championship in 1951 and 1953. During Tatum's tenure from 1946 to 1955, Maryland also secured one Southern Conference championship and two Atlantic Coast Conference championships. In 1962, Darryl Hill transferred to Maryland from the United States Naval Academy, making the school the first team in the Atlantic Coast Conference with a black player. Jerry Claiborne became head coach in 1972, and led Maryland to three consecutive ACC championships from 1974 to 1976. The Terrapins finished the 1976 regular season with an undefeated 11–0 record, but lost to Houston in the Cotton Bowl Classic, which ended national championship speculation. Bobby Ross replaced Claiborne in 1982, and he repeated the feat of three consecutive ACC championships from 1983 to 1985. In 1984, Maryland quarterback Frank Reich led the Terrapins to the then greatest halftime comeback against the defending national champions, Miami. After a long bowl game drought, Ralph Friedgen was hired as head coach in 2001, and in his first season, led Maryland to the ACC championship and its first Bowl Championship Series game appearance.

The football program has secured two NCAA-recognized national championships, nine ACC championships, two Southern Conference championships, eleven consensus All-America honors, and twenty-four bowl game appearances. Maryland possesses the third-most ACC championships with nine, which places them behind Clemson (13) and Florida State (12). Many former Terrapins players and coaches have gone on to careers in professional football including 15 first-round NFL draft picks.

- National Champions: 1951, 1953
- Undefeated Regular Seasons: 1893, 1951, 1953, 1955, 1976
- Conference Champions: 1937, 1951, 1953, 1955, 1974 - 1976, 1983 - 1985, 2001
- Bowl Appearances: 1947, 1949, 1951, 1953, 1955, 1973 - 1978, 1980, 1982 - 1985, 1990, 2001 - 2003, 2006 - 2008, 2010, 2013, 2014, 2016, 2021 - 2023

=== Men's lacrosse ===
The Terrapins men's lacrosse team is one of the most tradition-rich in all of collegiate lacrosse, having advanced to 14 NCAA Championship games since its inception in 1971, winning the title in 1973, 1975, and 2017. The Terrapins' lacrosse tradition traces back even further with eight Wingate Memorial Trophies between 1936 and 1970. As members of the Atlantic Coast Conference, the school won a record league-record 25 championships. Since joining the Big Ten Conference in 2014, Maryland has won five Big Ten championships and three Big Ten tournament championships.

- National Champions: 1928, 1936–37, 1939–40, 1955–56, 1959, 1967, 1973, 1975, 2017, 2022
- NCAA Finals: 1971, 1973–76, 1979, 1995, 1997–98, 2011–12, 2015–17, 2021–22
- NCAA Final Fours: 1971–79, 1983, 1987, 1989, 1991, 1995, 1997–98, 2003, 2005–06, 2011–12, 2014–2018, 2021–22
- NCAA Tournament Appearances: 1971–76, 1978–79, 1981–83, 1986–87, 1989, 1991–98, 2000–01, 2003–19, 2021–22
- Conference Champions: 1957–61, 1963, 1965–68, 1972–74, 1976–80, 1985, 1987, 1989, 1998, 2001, 2003–04, 2009, 2013–18, 2021–22
- Conference Tournament Champions: 1998, 2004–05, 2011, 2016–17, 2021–22

=== Women's lacrosse ===
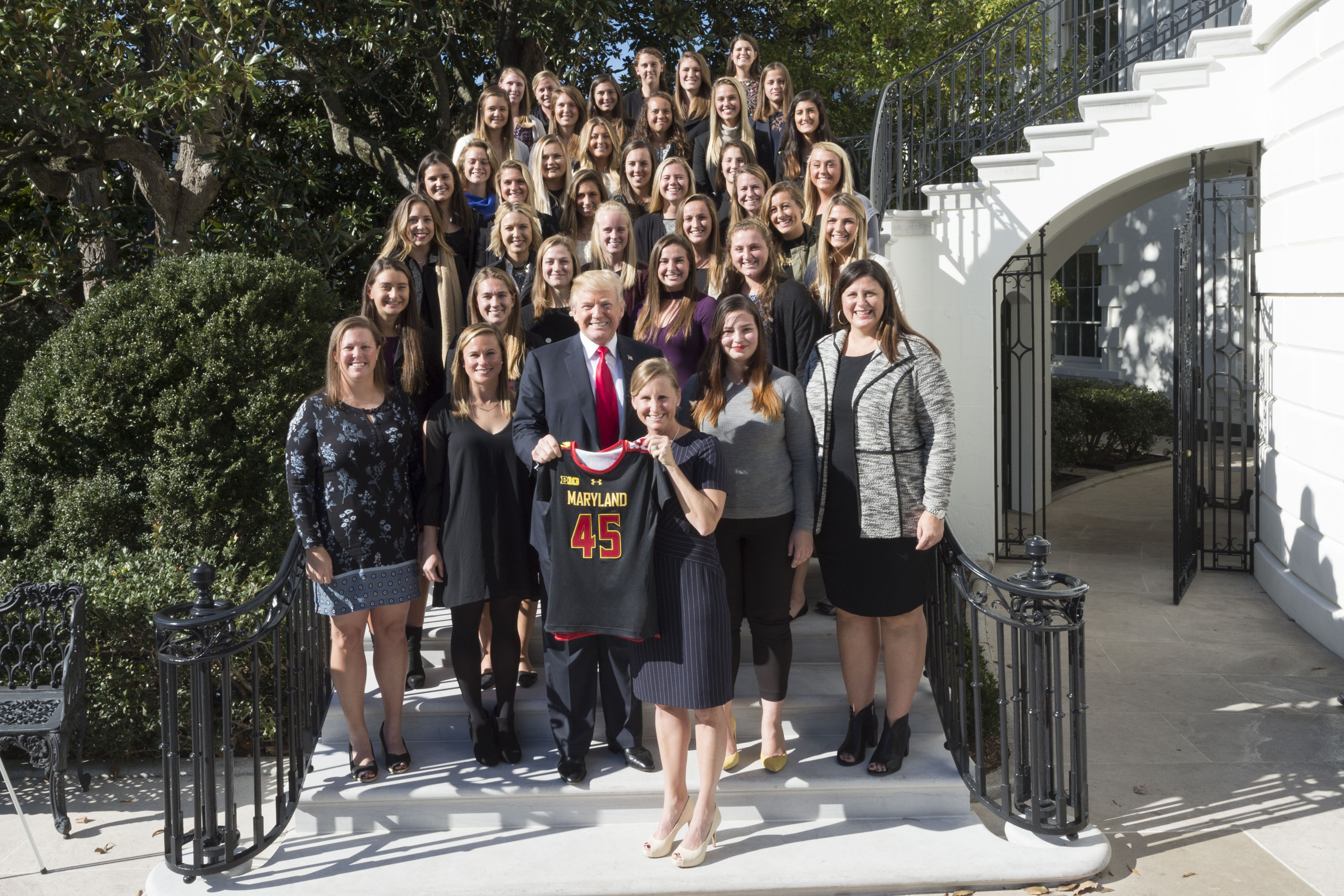
The women's lacrosse players with President Donald Trump in 2017

The Maryland Terrapins women's lacrosse team has won 15 national championships, the most of any program in the nation. The team has produced the National Player of the Year/Tewaaraton Award winner eight times, more than any other collegiate program. The Terrapins have also made the most NCAA tournament appearances, won the most tournament games, and made the most NCAA championship game appearances of any program.

- National Champions: 1981, 1986, 1992, 1995–2001, 2010, 2014, 2015, 2017, 2019
- NCAA Final Fours: 1984–1986, 1990–2001, 2003, 2009–2019
- NCAA Tournament Appearances: 1983–1987, 1990–2019, 2021
- Conference Champions: 1997, 1999, 2001, 2003, 2007–2011, 2013–2019
- Conference Tournament Champions: 1997, 1999–2001, 2003, 2009–2014, 2016–18

=== Men's soccer ===
The Maryland Terrapins men's soccer team has won four NCAA Division I College Cup national championships, most recently in 2018. Under the guidance of head coach Sasho Cirovski, the soccer team has reached nine Final Fours and won three College Cups since 1997. The soccer team has developed a large, devoted fan base among students and the local community. The attendance record at Ludwig Field was set in 2015 when 8,449 fans saw Maryland win over top-ranked UCLA in extra time. The annual total attendance increased dramatically from 12,710 in 1995 to 35,631 in 2008.

- NCAA National Champions: 1968, 2005, 2008, 2018
- NCAA College Cups: 1960, 1962, 1963, 1968, 1969, 1998, 2002 - 2005, 2008, 2012, 2013, 2018
- NCAA Tournament Appearances: 1959 - 1964, 1967 - 1971, 1973, 1976, 1986, 1994 - 1999, 2001 - 2020
- Conference Champions: 1949 - 1951, 1953 - 1968, 1971, 2012 - 2014, 2016, 2022
- Conference Tournament Champions: 1996, 2002, 2008, 2010, 2012 - 2016

=== Women's soccer ===
Since their season in 1987, the Terrapins women's soccer team has made 13 NCAA tournament appearances and reached 2 quarterfinals in 1995 and 1996.

=== Softball ===
The Terrapins softball team began play in 1995. The team has made four NCAA Tournament appearances in 1999, 2010, 2011, and 2012. The current head coach is Julie Wright.

=== Wrestling ===
Prior to joining the Big Ten in 2014, the Terrapins wrestling team won more ACC team championships than any other school in the conference, winning their 24th ACC title in 2012. The 2012 ACC championship is the Terps' fourth in the past five years. Maryland has finished in the top 20 at the NCAA Championships each year since the 2010 season and produced multiple all Americans since 2009, a school record. Two-time NCAA champion and two-time Olympian Kerry McCoy was head coach for eleven years until 2019. The XFINITY Center is the arena for the Terrapin Wrestling team.

Maryland has had over 200 ACC Champions, 2 NCAA National Champions, and 18 NCAA All-Americans. In 2010 Hudson Taylor became Maryland's first three-time all American with his fourth-place finish at 197 pounds. Spencer Myers became Maryland's first freshman in 2011 when he earned all American status with his sixth-place finish at heavyweight. The first wrestling team started in 1940 competed in the Southern Conference, with Paul McNeil becoming the Terps' first champion that same year at 175 pounds. In 2014, Jimmy Sheptock had one of the greatest runs in Maryland wrestling history, with a 32–1 record, ACC Championship, and the first Maryland wrestler to obtain a number one seed at the NCAA Championships, where he was runner-up to Ed Ruth.

The Maryland wrestling team was dominant in the ACC throughout the 1950s and 1960s and returned to claim two more conference titles in the late 2000s. However, in its first season in the Big Ten, Maryland failed to win a Big Ten dual meet. After 13 tries, Maryland finally won its first Big Ten dual meet January 10, 2016, against Michigan State.

In April 2019, former Edinboro wrestler and Missouri assistant Alex Clemsen was named head coach. During the 2022–23 season, a 4–0 start that included an upset of Pittsburgh gave the Terrapins their first win against a ranked opponent and national ranking for the first time since 2013, when Maryland was in the ACC.

== Notable non-varsity sports ==
=== Men's Club Crew (Rowing) ===
Maryland Men’s Crew (MMC), student-led rowing program at the University of Maryland. Founded in 1999, the team was established to restore a competitive rowing presence at UMD College Park. The club has grown to represent the university at national events including the Dad Vail Regatta and the ACRA National Championships.

According to marylandcrew.org, the program is a charter member of the American Collegiate Rowing Association (ACRA) and operates out of Bladensburg Waterfront Park on the Anacostia River. The club is well known for its "walk-on" culture, recruiting and training students with no prior rowing background to compete at a high intercollegiate level. As a student-run 501(c)(3) non-profit, the organization is managed by an elected Executive Board responsible for the fleet's maintenance, fundraising, and the logistical oversight of its season-long travel and competition schedule.

=== Figure skating ===
The Maryland Figure Skating Club began at UMD in 2004 and became a club sport in 2007. The club comprises three teams: a freestyle team and two synchronized skating teams. All teams compete in and out of region through the United States Figure Skating Association. The Maryland Terrapins Black are the reigning 2018 Eastern Sectional Champions in the Open Collegiate division

Skaters from across the three teams have, by invitation, performed demonstrations for a variety of publications, most recently being featured in the Washington Post: ter.ps/FigSkateWaPo.

=== Ice hockey ===
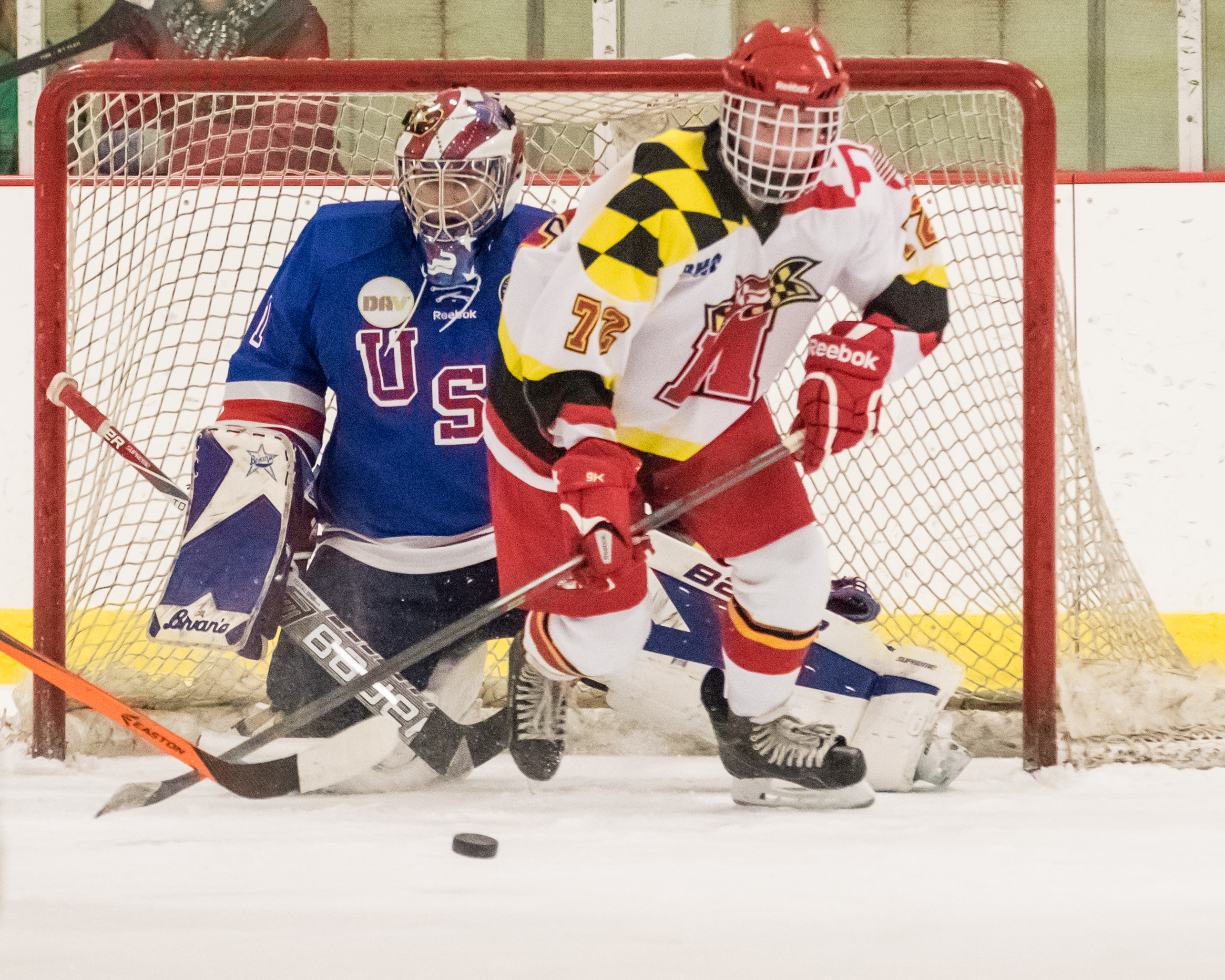
Maryland v USA Warriors in 2015

The University of Maryland has an ice hockey club, which competes in the Atlantic Coast Collegiate Hockey League.

=== Rugby ===
The Maryland Terrapins rugby team was founded in 1968. Maryland's best season was 1985, when Maryland played in the national championship final, losing 31–6 to Cal. (See National Collegiate Rugby Championship results.) Maryland plays in the Atlantic Coast Rugby League, a conference formed in 2011 along with other Atlantic Coast Conference schools. The Terps are led by head coach Jeff Soeken, who was a three-time All-American when he played rugby for Maryland.

Maryland was the champion of the league's inaugural 2011 season, defeating North Carolina, 39–32, in the title match. Maryland repeated as Atlantic Coast champion again in 2012, defeating Clemson. Maryland placed 10th in the 2012 Collegiate Rugby Championship (CRC), notching wins against Penn State and Oklahoma. The CRC is the highest-profile college rugby tournament in the country, held at PPL Park in Philadelphia and broadcast live on NBC. Maryland reached the semifinals of the 2012 ACI 7s tournament in Blacksburg.

== Traditions ==
=== Rivalries ===
Virginia Cavaliers Given their proximity and history in the Atlantic Coast Conference, there has been a longstanding multi-sport border rivalry with the Virginia Cavaliers. Matchups in men's basketball, football, soccer, and lacrosse have historically been the hottest matchups in the rivalry.

Several factors contribute to the intensity of the rivalry. The two states, and their eponymous flagship universities based in Charlottesville, Virginia and College Park, Maryland, respectively, share close historical and cultural ties. The schools are located in relatively close geographic proximity, separated by about 129 miles (208 km). Due in large part to this proximity, the schools aggressively compete for recruits in the Mid-Atlantic region. Former Maryland coach Ralph Friedgen expressed the importance of the rivalry by stating, "It's a potential rivalry in every sport we play. They're border states. We compete for students, not just athletes."

The two are both long-time members of the Atlantic Coast Conference, with Maryland becoming a founding member in 1953 and Virginia joining later in that same year. When the conference reorganized in 2005, Maryland and Virginia were placed in separate divisions, but designated as cross-divisional rivals that continue to meet annually. The intensity of the rivalry is increased by a long history in the series of comebacks, shutouts, and spoilers that prevented one team from securing a conference championship or bowl game appearance. From the 1920s until 1945, the teams competed for the Tydings Trophy, named for former politician and Maryland alum Millard Tydings who had several friends amongst the professors at Virginia. In 2003, the schools discussed reviving the trophy tradition, but it was ultimately rejected by Virginia, due to concerns over the reorganization of the ACC.

Before and after their meeting in 2010, players from both schools attributed the importance of the game to the negative feelings the programs have for each other. Virginia center Anthony Mihota said "I guess it's because we don't like them very much. Something about them that gets under our skin". After Maryland's victory, Terp linebacker Adrian Moten commented, "This was a big win in the rivalry. They hate us. We hate them."

The high academic standing of the University of Virginia in a national publication has added to the competitiveness between the two. In 2003, University of Maryland president C.D. Mote asserted that, in academic terms, Virginia was "highly overrated these days ... U.S. News & World Report places them at the top of the pile with Berkeley, which is ridiculous." Mote further stated that students from the state of Maryland paying a higher tuition cost to attend the University of Virginia "don't know any better." While the University of Virginia president, John Casteen, said such remarks can be taken out of context, Virginia board of visitors member, William H. Goodwin, responded in The Cavalier Daily, "I certainly think a college president should have more class, but you have to expect that from Maryland."

The rivalry has cooled since the Terrapins joined the Big Ten, but the schools have still met occasionally. The two schools have met in the ACC-Big Ten Challenge in men's basketball and at Audi Field for men's soccer in 2018 and 2019. Virginia eliminated Maryland in the NCAA baseball (2015) and men's lacrosse tournaments (2019), en route to Cavalier titles, which has deepened the animosity between the two schools.

West Virginia Mountaineers Maryland has a historic football rivalry with the neighboring West Virginia Mountaineers. While this has traditionally been a non-conference rivalry, it is usually regarded as a high quality non-conference matchup early in the season. It has historically been very competitive, with the Mountaineers leading the all-time series 28–23–2.

Duke Blue Devils The nature of the rivalry between Duke and Maryland is not viewed in the same manner by the schools' respective fans. While the Duke–UNC rivalry originated from geographic proximity and shared history, Duke fans do not view Maryland as a rival. However, several former Duke players have cited Maryland as the team against whom they played their most exciting games. Maryland fans traditionally see the Duke game as the biggest game of the year. Maryland fans have rioted in College Park after home games, regardless of the outcome. Famously, one fan threw a bottle and hit Carlos Boozer's mother in her head after Duke's remarkable comeback from a 10-point deficit in the final minute to beat Maryland, requiring the University of Maryland to issue a public apology. One year, most fans in the student section right behind the basket had to leave or turn their t-shirts inside-out because they had a FCC-banned explicative ("F**K DUKE") that could not be shown on television. Michael Wilbon, a sports journalist who works for ESPN, was formerly a writer for The Washington Post, and owns a home in Bethesda, Maryland, refers to the Duke–Maryland rivalry as "[o]ne of the best rivalries in one of the best basketball leagues in the country." In 2014, the Washington Post produced a short documentary on the peak of the rivalry from 2001 and 2002 which included interviews with Coach Williams and several former players from both teams.

Navy Midshipmen While the two teams have only met 21 times, Maryland and Navy are the state's only two FBS Football playing programs and have irregularly played in a matchup dubbed the Crab Bowl Classic. The Midshipmen lead the all-time football series 14–7.

Potential Big Ten Rivalries Since joining the Big Ten, there has been the potential for rivalries to develop with Penn State and Rutgers, two schools in neighboring states. While the matchup with Penn State has been traditionally one-sided in favor of the Nittany Lions and the series with Rutgers is still relatively new, either school could end up becoming a rival due to proximity.

=== Songs and chants ===
Victory Song The Maryland Victory Song was written in 1928 by Thornton W. Allen. It is played frequently during Terp Basketball and Football games. During Football games, it is played after every touchdown the Terps score, regardless of whether the team is winning or losing, celebrating the immediate victory of accomplishment. Ironically, the "Victory" song is played even after defeat.

During the M-A-R-Y-L-A-N-D section of the victory song, Terrapins fans show their clenched fists, and alternate pumping them in the air, beginning with their right fist on the "M" and alternating between left and right with each letter of the MARYLAND. The motion resembles someone climbing a ladder.

Alma Mater & Fight Song Other official school songs include the school's Alma Mater and Fight Song. Each of these are played at every home football game during the pregame festivities.

"Hey, You Suck!" A popular saying among the students at Maryland is a simple "Hey, You Suck!" directed at opponents. Students have incorporated the phrase into Gary Glitter's popular sports anthem "Rock and Roll Part Two" (often referred to as the "Hey Song"). Sometime in the early 2000s, then-football coach Ralph Friedgen asked that the song not be played at football games. Friedgen had never liked hearing the song since his return to College Park in 2001, and added that it hurt his recruiting efforts. In 2004, basketball coach Gary Williams followed Friedgen's lead and asked that the song not be played at basketball games either. While he personally liked the song, he'd come to believe that it didn't help his team win games. More importantly for Williams, he'd received a number of complaints from parents and grandparents who did not feel that the chant was appropriate. However, the students have continued to sing the song without the band's support. Before each basketball game and after every touchdown at football games, the crowd sings the song a cappella. An alternative version, which grew out of the Duke-Maryland basketball rivalry, replaces the phrase "You Suck" with "Fuck Duke". The band returned to playing the song in the early 2020s.

=== Football and basketball ===
Key Plays At football games, in addition to making noise to throw off the opposing team's offense, Terp fans will also shake their keys to signify urgency ("Key" Plays). This often happens during 3rd down plays when Maryland is on defense.

Fist Pump At the beginning of each men's basketball game during his tenure, Maryland Coach Gary Williams would pump his fist to signify a good game.

Midnight Madness Midnight Madness was originally started by Maryland Head Coach Lefty Driesell in 1970. Midnight Madness is held at the earliest time the Men's Basketball Team can practice, which used to be midnight on the first day of practice. Students would attend the practice and over the years it has evolved into a circus-like atmosphere, including light shows, magic shows, the mascot trampoline challenge, skits, food, beverage, and other fanfare.

Recently, Maryland and some other schools have moved the start of Midnight Madness to earlier in the day - generally around 7 o'clock - with permission of the NCAA. This is to encourage more families and fans who aren't even students to attend the event. As a result of this change, Midnight Madness has been rebranded as "Maryland Madness".

Newspaper Shaking Maryland students attempt to read the newspaper as the opposing team is being introduced. They shake the paper as the visiting team is introduced.

=== Other sport traditions ===
The Crew The Crew is a group of men's soccer fans. They generally sit behind the goal the opposing team is defending (switching sides at halftime) and berate the opposing goalie, referring to him by formal (given) name. Members of the Crew often travel to away games to continue to support their Terps. The Crew also organize activities to join the soccer environment.

== Championships ==
=== NCAA team championships ===
The University of Maryland has won 32 NCAA team national championships, 26 while a member of the Atlantic Coast Conference.

- Men's (9)
  - Basketball (1): 2002
  - Lacrosse (4): 1973, 1975, 2017, 2022
  - Soccer (4): 1968 (co-champions), 2005, 2008, 2018
- Women's (23)
  - Basketball (1): 2006
  - Field Hockey (8): 1987, 1993, 1999, 2005, 2006, 2008, 2010, 2011
  - Lacrosse (14): 1986, 1992, 1995, 1996, 1997, 1998, 1999, 2000, 2001, 2010, 2014, 2015, 2017, 2019
- See also:
  - List of NCAA schools with the most NCAA Division I championships
  - Big Ten Conference NCAA national team championships

=== Other national team championships ===
Below are 23 national team titles that were not bestowed by the NCAA:

- Men's
  - Football (1): 1953
  - Lacrosse (9): 1928, 1936, 1937, 1939, 1940, 1955, 1956, 1959, 1967
  - Rifle (4): 1947, 1949, 1953, 1954
- Women's:
  - Cheerleading (7): 1999, 2006, 2007, 2008, 2009, 2010, 2013
  - Rifle (1): 1932
  - Lacrosse (1): 1981
- See also:
  - List of Big Ten Conference National Championships

== Maryland Sports Radio Network ==
City	Call Sign	Frequency
Baltimore, Maryland	WJZ-AM	1300 AM
Baltimore, Maryland	WJZ-FM	105.7 FM
Cambridge, Maryland	WCEM-AM	1240 AM
Cumberland, Maryland	WCMD-AM	1230 AM
Frederick, Maryland	WFMD-AM	930 AM
Hagerstown, Maryland	WARK-AM	1490 AM
Lexington Park, Maryland	WPTX-AM	1690 AM
Oakland, Maryland	WMSG-AM	1050 AM
Pocomoke City, Maryland	WGOP-AM	540 AM
Pocomoke City, Maryland	WGOP-FM	100.7 FM
Pocomoke City, Maryland	WBEY-FM	97.9 FM
Prince Frederick, Maryland	WDCJ	92.7 FM
Salisbury, Maryland	WTGM-AM	960 AM
Washington, D.C.	WTEM-AM	980 AM

== See also ==
- List of college athletic programs in Maryland
