= WIBG =

WIBG may refer to:

- WIBG-FM, a radio station (94.3 FM) licensed to serve Avalon, New Jersey, United States
- WIP-FM, a radio station (94.1 FM) licensed to serve Philadelphia, Pennsylvania, United States, known as WIBG-FM from 1948 to 1969
- WWAC, a radio station (1020 AM) licensed to serve Ocean City/Somers Point, New Jersey, United States, which held the call sign WIBG from 1978 to 2021
- WNTP, a radio station (990 AM) licensed to serve Philadelphia, Pennsylvania, United States, known as WIBG from 1924 to 1977
