= WQMR =

WQMR may refer to:

== Present ==
- WQMR-LP, a radio station (101.3 FM) licensed to Rocky Mount, Virginia

== Past ==
- WGBG (AM), a radio station (1590 AM) licensed to serve Ocean City, Maryland, which held the call sign WQMR from 2011 to 2012
- WICO-FM, a radio station (101.1 FM) licensed to serve Snow Hill, Maryland, which held the call sign WQMR from 2000 to 2011
