= WGBZ =

WGBZ may refer to:

- WGBZ (FM) 88.3 MHz, Ocean City, Maryland — current holder of the call sign since June 2021; a relay of WGTS
- WNJD 102.3 MHz, Cape May, New Jersey — used the callsign WGBZ in 2000 and again from 2013 to 2021
- WFZX 1490 kHz, Anniston, Alabama — used the callsign WGBZ from 2011 to 2012
- WNJH 105.5 MHz, Cape May, New Jersey — used the callsign WGBZ from 2000 to 2007
- WAKZ 95.9 MHz, Youngstown, Ohio — used the callsign WGBZ from 1980 to 1982
