= WSNQ =

WSNQ may refer to:

- WHNK (AM), a radio station (1330 AM) licensed to serve Marion, Virginia, United States, which held the call sign WSNQ from 2017 to 2020
- WNJD, a radio station (102.3 FM) licensed to serve Cape May, New Jersey, United States, which held the call sign WSNQ from 2013 to 2014
- WNJH, a radio station (105.5 FM) licensed to serve Cape May Court House, New Jersey, which held the call sign WSNQ from 2007 to 2013
