= WSUX =

WSUX may refer to:

- WSUX (AM), a radio station (1280 AM) licensed to serve Seaford, Delaware, United States
- WICO-FM, a radio station (101.1 FM) licensed to serve Snow Hill, Maryland, United States, which held the call sign WSUX-FM from 2016 to 2017
