= WVES =

WVES may refer to:

- WVES (FM), a radio station (101.5 FM) licensed to serve Chincoteague, Virginia, United States
- WOWZ-FM, a radio station (99.3 FM) licensed to serve Accomac, Virginia, which held the call sign WVES from 1990 to 2017
