= WNJB =

WNJB may refer to:

- WNJB (TV), a television station (channel 58) licensed to New Brunswick, New Jersey, United States
- WNJB-FM, a radio station (89.3 FM) licensed to Bridgeton, New Jersey, United States
