= WCMC =

WCMC may refer to:

- WCMC (AM), a radio station (1230 AM) licensed to Wildwood, New Jersey, United States
- WCMC-FM, a radio station (99.9 FM) licensed to Holly Springs, North Carolina, United States
- WMGM-TV, a television station in Wildwood, New Jersey which held the call letters WCMC-TV from 1966 to 1981
- Weill Cornell Medical College in New York City, the medical college of Cornell University
- West China Medical Center, the medical center of Sichuan University, in Chengdu, Sichuan, China
- World Conservation Monitoring Centre of the United Nations Environment Programme
