= WZBZ =

Radio station in Atlantic City, New Jersey

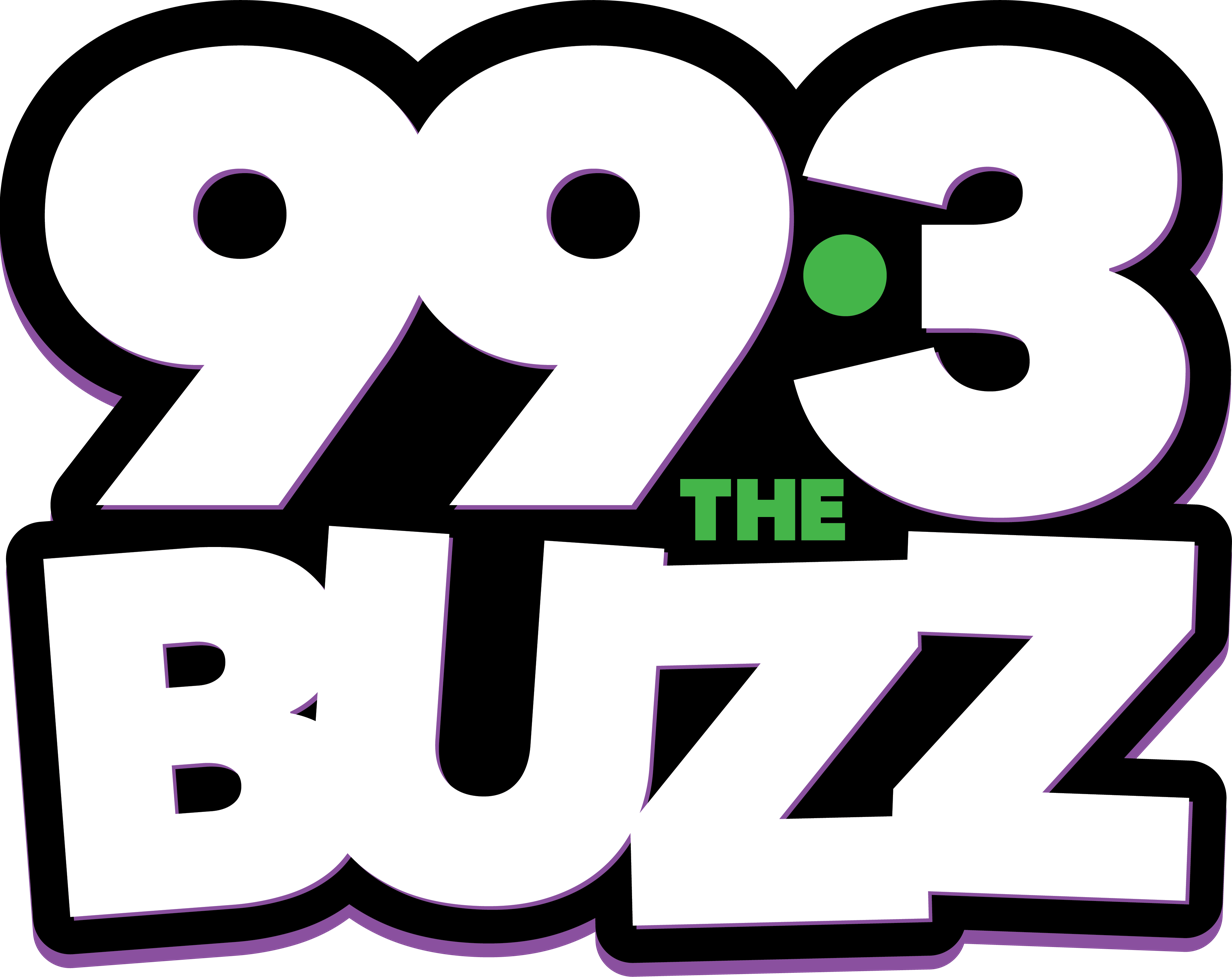

Pleasantville, New Jersey; United States
- Broadcast area: Atlantic City, New Jersey
- Frequency: 99.3 MHz
- Branding: 99-3 The Buzz

Programming
- Language: English
- Format: Rhythmic contemporary

Ownership
- Owner: iHeartMedia; (iHM Licenses, LLC)
- Sister stations: WAYV; WTTH; WZXL

History
- First air date: 1974
- Former call signs: WGRF (1974–1984); WLQE (1984–1987); WMID-FM (1987–1998); WSAX (1998–2000)
- Call sign meaning: "Buzz"

Technical information
- Licensing authority: FCC
- Facility ID: 1306
- Class: A
- ERP: 3,700 watts
- HAAT: 76 meters (249 ft)
- Transmitter coordinates: 39°22′52″N 74°27′0.6″W

Links
- Public license information: Public file; LMS
- Webcast: Listen live (via iHeartRadio)
- Website: 993thebuzz.iheart.com

WZBZ (99.3 FM; "99.3 The Buzz") is an urban-leaning rhythmic contemporary station in Atlantic City, New Jersey. Its studios are located at the Bayport One complex in West Atlantic City, and its transmitter is located north of the Casino district in Atlantic City.

== History ==
WZBZ's initial sign on was in 1974 as WGRF, an adult contemporary station and sister station to 1340 AM, WMID. WGRF was branded as Stereo 99. Together, WGRF and WMID were referred to as "The Dynamic Duo"; WMID was "The Jersey Giant" and WGRF was "The Jersey Mermaid". In 1983, WGRF became WLQE, a soft adult contemporary station branded as Lucky 99. Lucky 99's air staff included Dave Kerr, Christopher Caldwell, Bill Cain, Ron Houston, Ellis B "Bruce Ellis" Feaster, Kevin Hall, and Mike Sivilli. In 1988, the Lucky 99 moniker was dropped and the call letters were switched to the FM version of its sister's call sign becoming WMID-FM. The station continued with an adult contemporary format for another year and a half before switching to classic rock branded as "MID Rocks". In 1995, sister station 102.3 WSJL began simulcasting WMID-FM. This format would last seven years, until it became a smooth jazz station with the call letters WSAX in 1998. WSJL continued simulcasting 99.3 as WJSX.

Meanwhile, 105.5 WBNJ in Cape May County had flipped in February 1999 to a dance/rhythmic AC station known as WZBZ, "The Buzz 105.5". Don Brooks, owner and general manager, hired Ted Noah in January 1999 to launch the radio station in its new dance format, which was Noah's first official full-time on air position and programming job at 19 years old. Ted programmed and directed The Buzz musically and was also the afternoon announcer for the first three years. The station operated in Atlantic City right in front of the Tropicana Casino. Ironically, its signal reached the actual broadcast facilities. The broadcast tower served the extreme southern end of the Atlantic City/Cape May market on 105.5 FM, "B 105.5 The Buzz, The Beat Of South Jersey". It mainly covered Cape May, Southern and Western Atlantic and Eastern Cumberland Counties its first year.

In January 2000 the station then picked up 99.3 WSAX as a second frequency. This brought the station to cover the entire Atlantic City/Cape May market along with the fringes of the Monmouth-Ocean market. The WZBZ calls were moved from 105.5 to 99.3, replacing the WSAX calls; 105.5 became WGBZ. Later that year, the station added radio personality Shane Coyle as its main night DJ, following Ted Noah in the afternoons. Mike Ray "Big Daddy" was hired later on as well. A syndicated morning show, The Bob and Sheri Show was added to the line up. This left nights and mid-days automated, as well as some weekend mornings.

In less than a years' time, Shane Coyle's position was made automated, having only Ted Noah live in the afternoons. Another fill-in and weekend DJ was added to the line up: Ms. Kelly Rich, known on-air as "Kelly D-Vine". Kelly was the main mid-day weekend DJ and Noah's main fill in. TJ Thompson briefly hosted weekend shifts on the Buzz in 2001, usually Saturday afternoon/evening and Sunday afternoon.

In late February 2002, Ted Noah resigned, passing programming responsibilities to Rob Garcia, who also took over the afternoon time slot. With the resignation of Noah, Kelly Rich also resigned and removed herself completely from the broadcasting business. Within 2 months' time of Garcia acquiring the programming and on-air position, WZBZ, along with sister stations WGBZ, WMID and WMID-FM (the former WSJL/WJSX), were purchased by the competition. The new owner, Gary Fisher/Equity Broadcasting then changed the dance format to hip-hop and R&B. Rob Garcia and Big Daddy Mike Ray remained on air. In 2007, the WGBZ calls on simulcast 105.5 were changed to WSNQ.

99.3 Kiss FM logo

On June 5, 2008, WZBZ flipped from rhythmic "99.3 The Buzz" to mainstream Top 40 Kiss FM brand as "99-3 Kiss FM". Days before the official format change, they silently started adding top 40 songs to their playlist.

A week before Thanksgiving 2008, WZBZ started to remove pop rock songs from their playlist and re-added more hip hop and R&B songs to all dayparts except overnights, which still had some pop rock. This change effectively reverted WZBZ back to the rhythmic CHR format, and was done in order to differentiate WZBZ from sister WAYV which has a pure, mainstream CHR format. On December 5, Radio & Records moved WZBZ back to the rhythmic airplay panel.

In the fall of 2010, 99.3 Kiss FM was the highest rated station in the Atlantic City/Cape May, with Arbitron ratings at 9.2.

Previous logo

On March 8, 2013 at 12:00pm, the station re-branded to its former name "99.3 The Buzz".

On August 7, 2023, Equity Communications announced that it would sell WZBZ, along with its three other FM stations in the Atlantic City-Cape May market, to iHeartMedia. The acquisition was completed on December 5.
