= WSFD =

WSFD may refer to:

- WSFD-LD, a defunct low-power television station (channel 15) formerly licensed to serve Perry, Florida, United States
- WSUX (AM), a radio station (1280 AM) licensed to serve Seaford, Delaware, United States, which held the call sign WSFD in 2015
