= WAIV =

WAIV may refer to:

- WAIV (FM), a radio station (94.1 FM) licensed to serve Smyrna, Tennessee, United States
- WKGW (FM), a radio station (91.7 FM) licensed to serve Kingston, New York, United States, which held the call sign WAIV from 2023 to 2024
- WNJD, a radio station (102.3 FM) licensed to serve Cape May, New Jersey, United States, which held the call sign WAIV from 2003 to 2013 and from 2021 to 2023
