= WBEY-FM =

Radio station in Crisfield–Salisbury, Maryland

- Crisfield, Maryland; United States
- Broadcast area: Salisbury; Ocean City, Maryland
- Frequency: 97.9 MHz (HD Radio)
- Branding: Bay Country 97.9

Programming
- Format: Country music
- Affiliations: Westwood One; Maryland News Network

Ownership
- Owner: GSB Media, LLC
- Sister stations: WCTG; WICO-FM; WVES; WOWZ-FM; WOWZ-LD

History
- First air date: July 1995
- Former call signs: WLSL (1988–1995); WBEY (1995–2005)
- Former frequencies: 96.9 MHz (1995–2005)

Technical information
- Licensing authority: FCC
- Facility ID: 27438
- Class: A
- ERP: 4,300 watts
- HAAT: 115.6 meters (379 ft)
- Transmitter coordinates: 38°1′45.4″N 75°45′3.7″W

Links
- Public license information: Public file; LMS
- Website: baycountry979.com

WBEY-FM (97.9 FM) is a radio station broadcasting a country music format. Licensed to Crisfield, Maryland, United States, the station is owned by GSB Media, LLC, and features programming from Westwood One, Maryland News Network, and United Stations Radio Networks.

== History ==
WBEY originally signed on in July 1995, as WLSL on 96.9 FM in Crisfield, Maryland, carrying Westwood One's country music format. In the early 2000s, WBEY relocated its studios from Crisfield to Pocomoke City, Maryland.

In October 2018, WBEY-FM was purchased from Bay Broadcasting Inc. (Michael Powell) by A. Wray Fitch and Greg Bojko under the joint company GSB Media, LLC for $237,500, making WBEY the sixth station and third format operated by GSB Media, LLC. With the sale, WBEY-FM relocated from the studios and transmitter site of WGOP in Pocomoke City. It joined sister stations WCTG–WVES and WOWZ-FM–WOWZ-LP–WICO-FM.

== Affiliations ==
National and global news are provided by Westwood One.

Local News and weather is provided by Maryland News Network owned by Steve Clendenin.
