= WGBG =

WGBG may refer to:

- WGBG-FM, a radio station (107.7 FM) licensed to serve Fruitland, Maryland, United States
- WGBG (AM), a defunct radio station (1590 AM) formerly licensed to serve Ocean City, Maryland
- WKEW, a radio station (1400 AM) licensed to Greensboro, North Carolina, United States, which held the call sign WGBG from 1941 to 1980
- WUSX, a radio station (98.5 FM) licensed to Seaford, Delaware, United States, which held the call sign WGBG or WGBG-FM from 1998 to 2018
