= WNJH =

Simulcast of WKNZ, Harrington, Delaware
- Cape May Court House, New Jersey; United States
- Broadcast area: Cape May County
- Frequency: 105.5 MHz
- Branding: The Bridge

Programming
- Language: English
- Format: Christian adult contemporary

Ownership
- Owner: The Bridge of Hope, Inc.
- Sister stations: WKNZ; WNKZ-FM

History
- First air date: 1985 (as WBNJ)
- Former call signs: WBNJ (1985–1999); WZBZ (1999–2000); WGBZ (2000–2007); WSNQ (2007–2013); WAIV (2013–2021)

Technical information
- Licensing authority: FCC
- Facility ID: 40031
- Class: A
- ERP: 3,300 watts
- HAAT: 90 meters (300 ft)
- Transmitter coordinates: 39°7′32.4″N 74°49′24.6″W

Links
- Public license information: Public file; LMS
- Webcast: Listen live
- Website: wearethebridge.org

WNJH (105.5 MHz) is a non-commercial educational FM radio station licensed to Cape May Court House, New Jersey. The station is owned by The Bridge of Hope, Inc. and it simulcasts the Christian adult contemporary radio format of sister station 88.7 WKNZ Harrington. The studios and offices are in Milford, Delaware.

WNJH has an effective radiated power (ERP) of 3,300 watts. The transmitter is on Court House South Dennis Road in Middle Township, New Jersey.

== History ==
On September 5, 1985, the station originally signed on the air as WBNJ. WBNJ was an adult contemporary station that by 1989 had evolved into a new age music station marketed as "Joy 105.5".

In 1992, WBNJ tried flipping to several other formats, including a middle of the road (MOR) format for a few months, followed by a country music format branded as "Hit Country 105". When neither of these caught on, WBNJ began simulcasting an urban adult contemporary station, WTTH (96.1 FM), based in Margate. In 1995, the station was acquired by Margate Communications for $495,000.

In February 1999, WBNJ changed its call sign to WZBZ and flipped to a rhythmic adult contemporary station as "The Buzz 105.5." Don Brooks, owner and general manager, hired Ted Noah in January 1999 to launch the radio station in its new dance format. It was Noah's first official full-time on air position and programming job at 19 years old. Noah programmed and directed The Buzz musically and was also the afternoon announcer for the first three years. The station operated in Atlantic City right in front of The Tropicana Casino. Its signal reached the broadcast facilities, even though its broadcast tower served the extreme southern end of the Atlantic City/Cape May market, mainly covering Cape May, Southern and Western Atlantic and Eastern Cumberland Counties its first year.

In 2000, WZBZ began simulcasting on sister station WSAX (99.3 FM). While keeping the Buzz name, it switched formats to rhythmic contemporary hits. The WZBZ call sign moved to 99.3, which became the main station; 105.5 became WGBZ.

In 2002, WGBZ, along with sister stations WZBZ, WMID and WMID-FM, were purchased by Equity Communications, L.P., owner of then-rival CHR station WAYV.

In 2007, WGBZ's call letters were changed to WSNQ. In 2008, The Buzz became 99.3 Kiss FM and began playing more of a CHR format. WSNQ continued to broadcast a simulcast of WZBZ.

On December 15, 2011, at 7 p.m., the station flipped the WZBZ simulcast to classic hits, under the name "Sunny 105.5".

On August 26, 2013, WSNQ swapped formats and call signs with sister station WAIV (102.3 FM), a simulcast of WAYV.

Effective February 12, 2021, Equity Communications sold WAIV to The Bridge of Hope, Inc. for $65,000. On March 12, 2021, 105.5 returned to the air, stunting with family-friendly stand-up comedy ahead of their future format launch. The station began simulcasting on Tuesday, March 16 at 8am.
