= WZXL =

- Wildwood, New Jersey; United States
- Broadcast area: Atlantic City; Cape May
- Frequency: 100.7 MHz
- Branding: 100.7 WZXL

Programming
- Format: Mainstream rock

Ownership
- Owner: iHeartMedia; (iHM Licenses, LLC)
- Sister stations: WAYV; WTTH; WZBZ

History
- First air date: December 17, 1959
- Former call signs: WCMC-FM (1959–1981); WNBR (1981–1986)

Technical information
- Licensing authority: FCC
- Facility ID: 70260
- Class: B
- ERP: 38,000 watts
- HAAT: 101 meters (331 ft)
- Transmitter coordinates: 39°7′28.4″N 74°45′54.6″W

Links
- Public license information: Public file; LMS
- Webcast: Listen live (via iHeartRadio)
- Website: 1007wzxl.iheart.com

WZXL (100.7 FM, "100.7 ZXL") is a commercial radio station licensed to Wildwood, New Jersey, and owned by iHeartMedia. It airs a mainstream rock radio format. WZXL's studios are on Black Horse Pike in West Atlantic City.

Operating with 38,000 watts, WZXL serves Atlantic City and Cape May, New Jersey. Its transmitter is located on Avalon Boulevard, near the Garden State Parkway, just east of Swainton.

== History ==
The 100.7 frequency was originally used in the 1940s by the owners of WBAB (1490 AM) as WBAB-FM. However, WBAB-FM was gone by the early 1950s and the frequency was silent in the Atlantic City-Cape May market for nearly a decade.

On December 17, 1959, the owners of WCMC (1230 AM) in Wildwood signed on the 100.7 frequency as WCMC-FM. WCMC-FM was powered at 3,500 watts, a fraction of its current output. WCMC-AM-FM mostly simulcast a middle of the road (MOR) format of popular adult music, news and sports. The FM frequency did break away from the AM station at times during the baseball season by broadcasting Philadelphia Phillies games.

In 1981, WCMC-FM changed its call sign to WNBR and began playing adult contemporary music. On November 26, 1986, WNBR switched to WZXL, playing an album rock format that continues to this day, although the style of rock music has changed over the years.

Once a year, WZXL has a listener appreciation party known as the "Bike Bash". Recent Bike Bashes have been held at the Golden Nugget casino and the House of Blues at Showboat Atlantic City.

On August 7, 2023, Equity Communications announced that it would sell WZXL, along with its three other FM stations in the Atlantic City-Cape May market, to iHeartMedia. The acquisition was completed later that year on December 5.

In June 2026, morning show hosts JoJo & Scotty were laid off by iHeart. The station no longer has any local DJs.
