= WAYV =

Radio station in Atlantic City, New Jersey

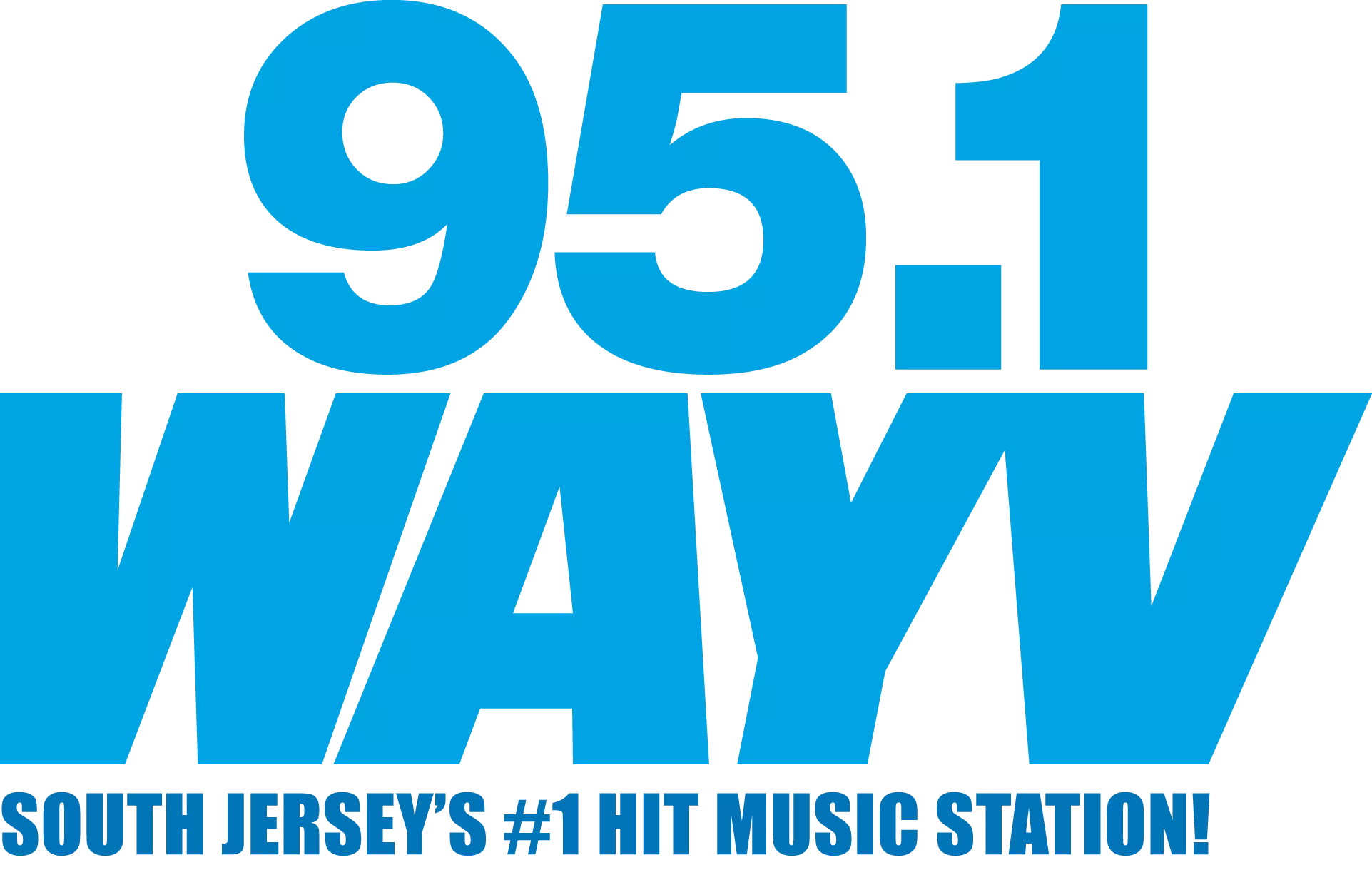
- Atlantic City, New Jersey; United States
- Broadcast area: Atlantic County, New Jersey
- Frequency: 95.1 MHz
- Branding: 95.1 WAYV

Programming
- Format: Contemporary hit radio
- Affiliations: Premiere Networks

Ownership
- Owner: iHeartMedia; (iHM Licenses, LLC)
- Sister stations: WTTH; WZBZ; WZXL

History
- First air date: 1961
- Former call signs: WRNJ (1961–1974)
- Call sign meaning: "Wave"

Technical information
- Licensing authority: FCC
- Facility ID: 3125
- Class: B
- ERP: 50,000 watts
- HAAT: 101 meters (331 ft)
- Transmitter coordinates: 39°22′51.4″N 74°27′1.5″W

Links
- Public license information: Public file; LMS
- Webcast: Listen live (via iHeartRadio)
- Website: 951wayv.iheart.com

WAYV (95.1 MHz) is a commercial FM radio station located in Atlantic City, New Jersey, owned by iHeartMedia. It airs an adult-leaning contemporary hit radio format. The station's studio is located at the Bayport One complex in West Atlantic City, and its transmitter is located north of Atlantic City.

== History ==
The station started broadcasting in April 1961, with call letters WRNJ. Mel Gollub, owner of WIFI in Philadelphia, built WRNJ on top of the Ritz-Carlton Atlantic City on the Atlantic City Boardwalk. He owned and operated it for its first two years.

In 1963, Gollub sold WRNJ to Eddie Newman, a nighttime talk host at WPEN in Philadelphia.

On July 1, 1974, Newman sold the station to Radio WAYV, Inc., and its call letters were changed to WAYV. The station featured a beautiful music format that lasted until 1977. The music was provided by Jim Schulke's Stereo Radio Productions.

In 1978, under Program Director Bob Everland, the format evolved into "The Music People", a soft rock format similar to "Magic" stations, such as WMGK in Philadelphia.

In January 1979, with the arrival of Kingsley Smith as Program Director, the format was made more contemporary and disco was added at night. The response to "Disco nights at the Jersey shore" was large enough so that in late 1979 WAYV became the "Rhythm of South Jersey" with full-time disco, and had its first time as #1 in the Spring 1980 Atlantic City Arbitron.

With the wane of disco in 1981, the format again evolved into hot adult contemporary daytime and contemporary hit radio (CHR) nighttime, with the arrival of John Barab as program director. That combination remained into the early 1990s through a number of program directors. In April 1990, WAYV started calling itself "Hot 95", which lasted for a short period of time. With some updates and adjustments over the last twenty years, the hot AC format still existed until 2011. Despite the disco and hot AC formats, WAYV also provided the first Atlantic City broadcast home for Jerry Blavat and his live broadcasts from Memories in Margate.

During the 1980s, WAYV's studios were located on the Atlantic City Boardwalk at Chelsea Ave., and before that, the broadcast studio was located on the rooftop of the Ritz Apartments (formerly the Ritz Carlton Hotel). From 1980 through 1981 the business office was located in a rowhouse on the beach block of California Avenue. The general manager at this time was Vi Trofa, a former school administrator who was hired by Radio WAYV, Inc.'s then-owners Bob McMurtrie, Carl Monk, and Tom Donatucci to run the business operation. Trofa was married to the former mayor of Ocean City, Nick Trofa, and would remain as General Manager through 1993. Throughout the mid-to-late 1980s, WAYV was an affiliate of The Rockin' America Top 30 Countdown with Scott Shannon.

In 1986, Radio WAYV Inc. was purchased by Robert Forrest. In 1991, WAYV moved from its Boardwalk location to its present studio site at the Bayport One building in West Atlantic City. In the fall of 1993, Atlantic City Broadcasting Corp., a subsidiary of Frank Osborn's Osborn Communications, began operating WAYV and purchased it in March 1994.

In June 1996, WAYV was purchased by Equity Communications. It remains in the Bayport One building, and was joined by Equity's other acquisitions, which included WZXL, WZBZ, and WTTH (and formerly WMID and WEZW). In 2003, WAYV began simulcasting on 102.3 WAIV, giving the station better coverage in the southern portion of the market as well as some penetration into Lewes, Delaware and coastal Sussex County.

By July 4, 2011, following their flashback weekend, the station changed to contemporary hit radio with Mediabase and Nielsen BDS moving the station to that panel later on.

On August 7, 2023, Equity announced that it would sell WAYV, along with its three other FM stations in the Atlantic City-Cape May market, to iHeartMedia. While the company did not retain WMID, WAIV, and WEZW, all three would later be sold to other broadcasters (with WEZW going to Educational Media Foundation and WAIV sold to Mighty Voice Broadcasting). On December 5, 2023, at midnight, iHeart officially took over all operations of four of the six stations owned by Equity, ending the 62-year run of local ownership.

In June 2026, longtime morning hosts Mike Kelso and Diane Mitchell were laid off in massive corporate downsizing by iHeartMedia. As a result of this, the station no longer has any local DJs. As of June 29, 2026, Elvis Duran and the Morning Show (based out of WHTZ (Z100) in New York City) has been airing in mornings 6 am-10 am.
