= WWAC =

Ocean City–Somers Point, New Jersey; United States
- Broadcast area: Atlantic City–Jersey Shore
- Frequency: 1020 kHz
- Branding: Hot Country 101

Programming
- Format: Country music

Ownership
- Owner: Enrico S. Brancadora
- Sister stations: WIBG-FM; WMID; WCMC

History
- First air date: June 12, 1964; 61 years ago
- Former call signs: WYKP (CP; 1962–1964); WSLT (1964–1978); WIBG (1978–2021)
- Former frequencies: 1520 kHz (1964–198?)
- Call sign meaning: Atlantic City

Technical information
- Licensing authority: FCC
- Facility ID: 19617
- Class: D
- Power: 1,900 watts (day); 680 watts (critical hours)
- Translators: 97.9 W250AK (Rio Grande); 101.3 W267BP (Pleasantville); 101.9 W270DV (Palermo)

Links
- Public license information: Public file; LMS
- Webcast: Listen live
- Website: www.wibg.com/hotcountry101

WWAC (1020 AM) is a commercial radio station licensed to Ocean City, New Jersey, and serving the Atlantic City area of the Jersey Shore. It is owned by Enrico S. Brancadora, broadcasting a country music radio format. WWAC is co-owned with WIBG-FM, a classic hits station licensed to Avalon, New Jersey.

By day, WWAC is powered at 1,900 watts, non-directional. WWAC's signal reaches from Toms River to Cape May. Because 1020 AM is a clear channel frequency reserved for 50,000 watt Class A station KDKA in Pittsburgh, WWAC must go off the air at night to avoid interference. During critical hours, WWAC is powered at 680 watts.

Programming is also heard on several FM translators around the clock: W250AK 97.9 Mhz in Rio Grande, W267BP 101.3 MHz in Pleasantville, and W270DV 101.9 MHz in Palermo.

== History ==
The station signed on the air on June 12, 1964. The original call sign was WSLT and the original frequency was 1520 kHz. The studios were on Asbury Avenue and the original owner was Salt-Tee Radio.

The call sign was changed to WIBG in 1978 after the call sign went out of use in Philadelphia. The station broadcast with various formats over the years including middle of the road (MOR), Top 40, oldies and country music. In the early 1980s, WIBG lost the lease on its transmitter site in Somers Point and went off the air for a time. A replacement site in Cape May County was eventually located. The station built a new tower site and returned to the air, changing its frequency to 1020 kHz in the process. The revived WIBG aired Spanish-language programming and tourist information before adopting a Christian radio format.

On November 19, 2008, WIBG joined Radiolicious and began streaming on the iPhone and iPod Touch.

In October 2011, the station changed to a talk radio format. In May 2013, WIBG dropped its syndicated talk programs and began programming music on weekdays, with some local talk shows and religious broadcasts continuing to be broadcast on weekends, along with "Wibbage Gold" oldies. On June 3, 2013, the format changed to Spanish hits "En Vivo 1020".

In January 2017, the station changed its moniker to "La Mega 101.3", referring to the dial position of its primary FM translator. The call sign was switched to WWAC on April 7, 2021.

On August 12, 2023, WWAC dropped its simulcast of La Mega in favor of "Wibbage Gold" oldies, while retaining its long-form Saturday talk programs. However, this would turn out to be a placeholder, as the station would end up stunting on August 31 with a loop of "Last Night" by Morgan Wallen, with bumpers between playings consisting solely of sounds of a cat running away, a nod towards new rival WPUR, branded as "Cat Country". This lead into a flip to country music as "Hot Country 101" the following day.

== Translators ==
Programming is also heard on several FM translators around the clock: W250AK 97.9 Mhz in Rio Grande, W267BP 101.3 MHz in Pleasantville, and W270DV 101.9 MHz in Palermo.

Broadcast translators for WWAC
Call sign	Frequency	City of license	FID	ERP (W)	HAAT	Transmitter coordinates	FCC info
W250AK	97.9 FM	Rio Grande, New Jersey	141479	38	81 m (266 ft)	39°0′32.4″N 74°52′11.6″W	LMS
W267BP	101.3 FM	Pleasantville, New Jersey	142147	250	84 m (276 ft)	39°22′35.8″N 74°33′42.2″W	LMS
W270DV	101.9 FM	Palermo, New Jersey	200731	250	84 m (276 ft)	39°13′45.0″N 74°40′53.0″W	LMS
