= WDMV =

Regional Mexican radio station in Walkersville, Maryland

- Walkersville, Maryland; United States
- Broadcast area: Washington metropolitan area
- Frequency: 700 kHz
- Branding: "La Jefa 700"; ("The Boss 700")

Programming
- Language: Spanish
- Format: Regional Mexican

Ownership
- Owner: Birach Broadcasting Corporation

History
- First air date: February 1996
- Former call signs: WWTL (1996–2002); WGOP (2002–2004)
- Call sign meaning: District Maryland Virginia

Technical information
- Licensing authority: FCC
- Facility ID: 19235
- Class: D
- Power: 5,000 watts (daytime only)
- Transmitter coordinates: 39.7727°N 77.1927°W

Links
- Public license information: Public file; LMS
- Webcast: Listen live
- Website: lajefa700.com

WDMV (700 kHz, "La Jefa 700") is a broadcast AM radio station licensed to Walkersville, Maryland, United States, serving the Washington metropolitan area. WDMV is owned and operated by Birach Broadcasting Corporation.

== History ==
The WDMV call letters were first assigned to a radio station at 540 AM in Pocomoke City, Maryland, on the Delmarva Peninsula in the mid-1950s. The station went on the air in 1955, as WDVM and the later call letter change to WDMV reflected their "Wonderful Delmarva" logo. Eddie Matherly, known as "Mama's Country Youngin", was an icon during the station's country music days in the mid-1950s. Then came "Delmarvarama" for several years featuring a mix of all-time pop music favorites. Ownership and format changes have dotted the Pocomoke City station's history.

AM 700 in Walkersville, Maryland, signed on as WWTL in February 1996, Until 2002, WWTL had an Arabic music/talk format, but in the aftermath of 9/11 a quick change to conservative talk WGOP happened. This lasted for a few years when the WGOP calls moved to sister station AM 540, and AM 700, became WDMV. Since then WDMV's has gone brokered featuring various formats over the years including ethnic programming, business talk and Spanish programming.

WDMV signs off at night to protect WLW, a clear-channel station which also broadcasts on AM 700.

WDMV went silent on February 6, 2009. Its operator, National Radio Corporation, has filed for bankruptcy in the U.S. Bankruptcy Court for the Eastern District of Virginia. WDMV came back on the air on January 11, 2010, with a oldies format. On January 26, 2010, the station switched to a Spanish-language oldies format. On March 23, 2010, WDMV again went silent. In April 2011, WDMV returned to the air with Spanish-language programming as "La Jefa".

On April 6, 2017, WDMV was granted a construction permit to upgrade to 50 kW daytime. The application was held up for some 11 years while Birach unsuccessfully attempted to move WGOP (540 AM) to Damascus, Maryland.
