= WCTG =

Radio station in West Pocomoke, Maryland

- West Pocomoke, Maryland; United States
- Broadcast area: Salisbury, Maryland
- Frequency: 96.5 MHz
- Branding: 96.5 & 101.5 CTG

Programming
- Format: Adult hits
- Affiliations: AccuWeather; Fox News Radio

Ownership
- Owner: GSB Broadcasting; (Sebago Broadcasting Company)
- Sister stations: WICO-FM; WVES

History
- First air date: 2004
- Call sign meaning: Chincoteague (former community of license)

Technical information
- Licensing authority: FCC
- Facility ID: 88405
- Class: A
- ERP: 3,900 watts
- HAAT: 100 meters (330 ft)
- Transmitter coordinates: 38°11′53.4″N 75°40′48.7″W

Links
- Public license information: Public file; LMS
- Webcast: Listen live
- Website: ctgvariety.com

WCTG is an adult hits formatted broadcast radio station licensed to West Pocomoke, Maryland, and serving the Salisbury area. WCTG is owned and operated by GSB Broadcasting.

== History ==
WCTG signed on in 2004. On March 7, 2016, Sebago Broadcasting Company, under the licensee of GSB Broadcasting, LLC, closed on the sale of WICO-FM. On the same date, WICO-FM began simulcasting WCTG and the station's adult hits format.

On October 26, 2018, WCTG began transmitting from its new facilities licensed to West Pocomoke, Maryland, and serving the Salisbury area; the station concurrently began simulcasting on WVES in Chincoteague, Virginia, WCTG's previous location. WCTG's previous Salisbury-area simulcast, WICO-FM, had been sold a year earlier to The Bridge of Hope.
