= WGBG (AM) =

Ocean City, Maryland; United States
- Frequency: 1590 kHz

Ownership
- Owner: Adams Radio Group, LLC; (Adams Radio of Delmarva Peninsula, LLC)
- Sister stations: WBEY-FM

History
- First air date: 1960 (as WETT)
- Last air date: January 2018
- Former call signs: WETT (1960–2001); WKHZ (2001–2010); WMHZ (2010–2011); WAMS (4/2011–9/2011); WQMR (2011–2012); WAMS (8/2012–11/2012); WIJK (2012–2016)

Technical information
- Facility ID: 41484
- Class: B
- Power: 1,000 watts day; 230 watts night
- Transmitter coordinates: 38°24′16.4″N 75°7′35.7″W

WGBG (1590 AM) was a radio station licensed to serve Ocean City, Maryland, United States. The station was owned by Adams Radio Group, LLC, through licensee Adams Radio of Delmarva Peninsula, LLC.

== History ==
In September 2010, WKHZ began relaying on an FM translator, W286BB on 105.1 MHz, in Ocean Pines, Maryland. On December 23, 2010, the station changed its call letters from WKHZ to WMHZ. On April 21, 2011, the station changed its call letters from WMHZ to WAMS.

On September 15, 2011, WAMS changed its call letters to WQMR and changed its format to talk, branded as "Hot Talk WQMR".

On August 13, 2012, WQMR changed its call letters back to WAMS, and changed its format to oldies. On October 26, 2012, WAMS changed its format again, this time to adult hits, branded as "Jack FM". The call letters changed to WIJK on November 20, 2012.

On April 6, 2013, WIJK once again changed its format, this time to a sports talk format as an affiliate of CBS Sports Radio as "The Jock". On November 18, 2013, WIJK went silent; it returned to the air by May 2014, again carrying CBS Sports Radio.

On August 24, 2014, WIJK and W286BB were acquired by Eastern Shore Media/Bay Broadcasting, Inc, and were used to simulcast the country music format of WBEY-FM to the Ocean City, Berlin/Ocean Pines, and Fenwick area.

In January 2015, WIJK changed its format to alternative rock, branded as "105.1 The Ryde"; the format moved from WRYD (101.1 FM), which flipped to country.

Effective May 21, 2016, Bayshore Media transferred the licenses for WGBG and translators W282AW and W286BB to Adams Radio Group, LLC, in exchange for the licenses for WSUX and translator W242AV. On May 25, 2016, WIJK changed its format to a simulcast of classic rock-formatted WGBG (98.5 FM). On June 7, 2016, WIJK changed its call letters to WGBG. On December 12, 2016, WGBG went silent.

In January 2017, the station returned to the air, once again simulcasting WBEY-FM's country format.

In January 2018, the station went silent. By way of a letter dated November 29, 2017, Adams Radio surrendered WGBG's license to the Federal Communications Commission (FCC). The FCC cancelled the station's license and deleted the WGBG call sign on February 12, 2018.
