= WTTH =

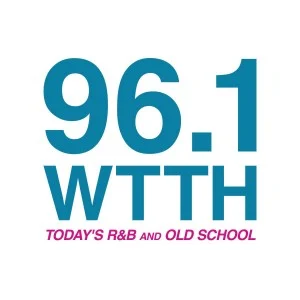
- Margate City, New Jersey; United States
- Broadcast area: Atlantic City, New Jersey
- Frequency: 96.1 MHz
- Branding: 96.1 WTTH

Programming
- Format: Urban adult contemporary
- Affiliations: Premiere Networks

Ownership
- Owner: iHeartMedia; (iHM Licenses, LLC)
- Sister stations: WAYV; WZBZ; WZXL

History
- First air date: 1989
- Former call signs: WFOU (1989–1990); WMXL (1990–1991)
- Call sign meaning: The Touch

Technical information
- Licensing authority: FCC
- Facility ID: 40030
- Class: A
- ERP: 3,600 watts
- HAAT: 76 meters (249 ft)
- Transmitter coordinates: 39°22′52″N 74°27′0.6″W

Links
- Public license information: Public file; LMS
- Webcast: Listen live (via iHeartRadio)
- Website: 961wtth.iheart.com

WTTH (96.1 FM) is an urban adult contemporary music formatted radio station licensed to Margate City, New Jersey. It serves the general Atlantic City metro area. Its studios are located at the Bayport One complex in West Atlantic City, and its transmitter is located in the Casino district in Atlantic City.

== History ==
WTTH first signed on as WFOU in 1989. It first changed its callsign to WMXL in 1990 before becoming WTTH, branded as "The Touch", in 1991. As The Touch, WTTH plays an urban AC format.

The Touch once operated a simulcast on 105.5 WBNJ in Cape May County from 1994 until 1999. The simulcast then moved to 93.1 WDTH until 2009, when WDTH became Easy 93.1 WEZW.

In 2004 and 2005, WTTH and WDTH were two of the earliest stations in the country to flip to an all-Christmas format.

On August 7, 2023, Equity Communications announced that it would sell WTTH, along with its three other FM stations in the Atlantic City-Cape May market, to iHeartMedia. The acquisition was completed on December 5.

== Programming ==
WTTH is the Atlantic City home of the nationally syndicated Steve Harvey Morning Show. Up until August 9, 2019, the station was home to the Tom Joyner Morning Show. Music the rest of the day is automated urban AC music. On weeknights, the station simulcasts The Sweat Hotel with Keith Sweat.

Prior to December 2023, WTTH would air classic hip hop songs, in what it called "Throwback Weekend." Additionally, the station previously simulcast the popular "Bob Pantano Saturday Night Dance Party" from Philadelphia's WOGL on Saturdays.

== History of callsign ==
The callsign WTTH was previously assigned to an AM station in Port Huron, Michigan, that began broadcasting December 6, 1947. A sister station, WTTH-FM began broadcasting that same day.
