= WNKZ-FM =

Radio station in Pocomoke City, Maryland, United States

Simulcast of WKNZ, Harrington, Delaware
- Pocomoke City, Maryland; United States
- Broadcast area: Crisfield; Princess Anne; Salisbury
- Frequency: 92.5 MHz
- Branding: The Bridge

Programming
- Format: Christian adult contemporary

Ownership
- Owner: The Bridge of Hope, Inc.
- Sister stations: WNJH; WKNZ

History
- First air date: October 2000
- Former call signs: WZJZ (2000–2002); WXMD (2002–2009); WICO-FM (2009–2017)

Technical information
- Licensing authority: FCC
- Facility ID: 60884
- Class: A
- ERP: 2,950 watts
- HAAT: 144 meters (472 ft)
- Transmitter coordinates: 38°8′35.4″N 75°39′51.7″W

Links
- Public license information: Public file; LMS
- Webcast: Listen live
- Website: wearethebridge.org

WNKZ-FM is a Christian adult contemporary formatted broadcast radio station licensed to Pocomoke City, Maryland, serving Princess Anne, Salisbury, and Crisfield in Maryland. WNKZ-FM is owned and operated by The Bridge of Hope, Inc.

== History ==
WNKZ-FM signed on as WZJZ in October 2000. On March 7, 2016, Sebago Broadcasting Company, under the licensee of GSB Broadcasting, LLC, closed on the sale of the then-WICO-FM. On the same date, WICO-FM began simulcasting its new sister station, WCTG, and that station's adult hits format.

On April 1, 2017, WICO-FM went silent and returned to the air on May 1, 2017, with a simulcast of Christian adult contemporary-formatted WKNZ from Harrington, Delaware. On June 16, 2017, WKNZ's owner The Bridge of Hope, Inc. consummated the purchase of WICO-FM for $250,000. On November 10, 2017, WICO-FM changed its call sign to WNKZ-FM.
