= WNJD =

Radio station in Cape May, New Jersey

- Hartly, Delaware; United States
- Broadcast area: Dover, Delaware
- Frequency: 102.3 MHz
- Branding: Capital 102.3

Programming
- Format: Conservative talk radio
- Affiliations: Salem Radio Network; Townhall; Westwood One

Ownership
- Owner: Jim Weller and Collin Walls; (Mighty Voice Broadcasting)

History
- First air date: 1967
- Former call signs: WRIO-FM (1967–1983); WSJL (1983–1998); WJSX (1998–2000); WGBZ (2000); WZBZ (2000); WSAX (2000–2001); WMID-FM (2001–2003); WAIV (2003–2013); WSNQ (2013–2014); WGBZ (2014–2021); WAIV (2021–2023)

Technical information
- Licensing authority: FCC
- Facility ID: 37475
- Class: A
- ERP: 6,000 watts
- HAAT: 57 meters (187 ft)
- Transmitter coordinates: 38°59′34.4″N 74°48′46.6″W

Links
- Public license information: Public file; LMS
- Website: capital1023.com

WNJD (102.3 FM) is a commercial radio station licensed to Hartly, Delaware. It is owned by Jim Weller and Colin Walls, through licensee Mighty Voice Broadcasting, and it broadcasts a conservative talk radio format.

WNJD is a Class A FM station with an effective radiated power (ERP) of 6,000 watts. Its transmitter is in Wildwood, on New Jersey Avenue at Maple Avenue.

== Programming ==
Most of WNJD's programming is nationally syndicated conservative talk show hosts. On weekdays, the line-up includes Chris Stigall, Chris Plante, Charlie Kirk, Hugh Hewitt, Armstrong & Getty, Larry Elder, Eric Metaxas and America in the Morning. Most hours begin with an update from Townhall News.

On weekends, syndicated shows include World Travel with Rudy Maxa and Real Estate Today as well as repeats of weekday shows. Several hours each Saturday and Sunday are devoted to Yacht rock music.

== History ==
=== WRIO, WSJL and WSAX ===
The station signed on the air on June 3, 1967. The original call sign was WRIO-FM, airing a Christian radio format. The WRIO call letters had previously been used on the 101.7 frequency. In 1983, 102.3's call sign was changed to WSJL, which stood for "South Jersey's Lighthouse". WSJL continued the religious format until 1995.

In July 1995, WSJL began simulcasting its sister station, WMID-FM 99.3, which had an album rock sound at the time. In 1997, both stations changed their formats to smooth jazz. WMID-FM picked up the call sign WSAX while WSJL became WJSX, both representing the word saxophone, a common instrument heard in smooth jazz.

In 2000, when 99.3 became a simulcast of The Buzz 105.5, WJSX continued in the smooth jazz format but took the WSAX call sign from 99.3.

=== WMID-FM and WAIV ===
In 2001, smooth jazz ended on 102.3. The station became a simulcast of sister station WMID, which was playing adult standards. The call sign on 102.3 changed to WMID-FM (which had once been on 99.3). Two years later, WMID-FM, along with sister stations WZBZ, WGBZ and WMID, were sold to Equity Communications in Atlantic City. It began simulcasting 95.1 WAYV, and changed its call sign to WAIV.

In 2011, WAYV/WAIV, along with sister station WZXL, were named official stations of the Wildwoods boardwalk. Because the WAIV frequency is much stronger near Wildwood than in other towns in the listening area, the 102.3 frequency was advertised slightly more during this time than it is closer to Atlantic City. This included signs on the boardwalk's famous tram cars advertising both frequencies.

=== WSNQ and WGBZ ===
On August 26, 2013, WAIV swapped formats and call signs with sister station WSNQ.

On July 7, 2014, WSNQ changed its call sign to WGBZ and changed its format to rhythmic contemporary, simulcasting WZBZ 99.3 FM in Pleasantville, New Jersey.

In January 2021, with the impending sale of 105.5 WAIV to Christian broadcaster The Bridge, WGBZ ended simulcasting WZBZ and began simulcasting again with WAYV. WGBZ changed its call sign back to WAIV on February 23, 2021.

=== Conservative talk WNJD ===
In June 2023, Equity Communications sold WAIV to Mighty Voice Broadcasting. On September 21, 2023, the sale closed, and the station dropped its simulcast of WAYV the following day. At that point, it began airing conservative talk radio programs, under the name "Fine Day Radio". The station changed its call sign to WNJD on October 17, 2023.

=== Move to Delaware ===
On November 9, 2026, WNJD moved to Dover, Delaware, changed its city of license to Hartly, and rebranded as "Capital 102.3". Alongside the change, 9 additional streaming-only subchannels were added to the station's website (jazz-formatted Capital Lounge, yacht rock-formatted Capital Yacht, urban adult contemporary-formatted Capital Soul, classic country-formatted Capital Legends, adult contemporary-formatted Capital Sunny, classic rock-formatted Capital Classics, oldies-formatted Capital Gold, 2000s country-formatted Capital Millennial and CHR-formatted Capital Hits).
