= Palermo, New Jersey =

Populated place in Cape May County, New Jersey, US

- Census-designated place
- Location in Cape May County Location in New Jersey Location in the United States
- Coordinates: 39°14′24″N 74°40′21″W
- Country: United States
- State: New Jersey
- County: Cape May
- Township: Upper

Area
  - Total: 3.18 sq mi (8.23 km^{2})
  - Land: 3.11 sq mi (8.06 km^{2})
  - Water: 0.062 sq mi (0.16 km^{2})
- Elevation: 16 ft (4.9 m)

Population (2020)
  - Total: 3,183
  - Density: 1,022.7/sq mi (394.86/km^{2})
- Time zone: UTC−05:00 (Eastern (EST))
  - Summer (DST): UTC−04:00 (EDT)
- FIPS code: 34-55710
- GNIS feature ID: 879097

Palermo is an unincorporated community and census-designated place (CDP) located in Upper Township, in Cape May County, in the U.S. state of New Jersey.

As of the 2020 census, Palermo had a population of 3,183.

Palermo is located 14 mi (23 km) northeast of Cape May Court House.

The Palermo Air Force Station, closed in 1970, was located south of Palermo.

== History ==
An early settler, Henry Young, arrived in New Jersey aboard a whaling vessel prior to 1700, and established a plantation extending west from Palermo.

The Friendship School in Palermo was built around 1830 and was restored in 1980. It is one of the oldest schools in Upper Township.

A post office was established in 1872.

The Ocean City Railroad constructed a line through Palermo, and a station was erected there in 1897. The line later became part of the Pennsylvania-Reading Seashore Lines. The line is now abandoned.

In 1953, a proposed extension of the Garden State Parkway was to be constructed through Palermo. Several Upper Township farmers complained about the route, including one from Palermo who claimed "the parkway went through the center of his piggery". A commission was established to settle disputes between farmers and the Parkway Authority.

== Demographics ==
Historical population
Census	Pop.	Note	%±
2020	3,183		—
U.S. Decennial Census; 2020

Palermo was first listed as a census designated place in the 2020 U.S. census.

=== 2020 census ===
As of the 2020 census, Palermo had a population of 3,183. The median age was 50.5 years. 21.2% of residents were under the age of 18 and 26.8% of residents were 65 years of age or older. For every 100 females there were 88.8 males, and for every 100 females age 18 and over there were 85.0 males age 18 and over.

Palermo CDP, New Jersey – Racial and ethnic composition Note: the US Census treats Hispanic/Latino as an ethnic category. This table excludes Latinos from the racial categories and assigns them to a separate category. Hispanics/Latinos may be of any race.
Race / Ethnicity (NH = Non-Hispanic)	Pop 2020	2020
White alone (NH)	2,956	92.87%
Black or African American alone (NH)	17	0.53%
Native American or Alaska Native alone (NH)	3	0.09%
Asian alone (NH)	28	0.88%
Native Hawaiian or Pacific Islander alone (NH)	1	0.03%
Other race alone (NH)	22	0.69%
Mixed race or Multiracial (NH)	82	2.58%
Hispanic or Latino (any race)	74	2.32%
Total	3,183	100.00%

100.0% of residents lived in urban areas, while 0.0% lived in rural areas.

There were 1,274 households in Palermo, of which 22.7% had children under the age of 18 living in them. Of all households, 57.2% were married-couple households, 13.0% were households with a male householder and no spouse or partner present, and 25.0% were households with a female householder and no spouse or partner present. About 27.5% of all households were made up of individuals and 17.3% had someone living alone who was 65 years of age or older.

There were 1,395 housing units, of which 8.7% were vacant. The homeowner vacancy rate was 1.1% and the rental vacancy rate was 3.0%.

== Education ==
As with other parts of Upper Township, the area is zoned to Upper Township School District (for grades K-8) and Ocean City School District (for high school). The latter operates Ocean City High School.

Countywide schools include Cape May County Technical High School and Cape May County Special Services School District.
