= WGOP =

Radio station in Pocomoke City, Maryland, United States

- Pocomoke City, Maryland; United States
- Frequency: 540 kHz
- Branding: Sunny 106.5

Programming
- Format: Classic hits

Ownership
- Owner: The Waters Group, LLC

History
- First air date: August 1, 1955
- Last air date: April 1, 2025
- Former call signs: WDVM (1955–1959); WDMV (1959–2004)
- Call sign meaning: "Grand Old Party", a nickname for the Republican Party, owing to the station's former status as a conservative talk radio station

Technical information
- Licensing authority: FCC
- Facility ID: 5347
- Class: B
- Power: 500 watts day; 243 watts night
- Transmitter coordinates: 38°3′11.44″N 75°34′9.73″W
- Translator: 106.5 W293DN (Pocomoke City)

Links
- Public license information: Public file; LMS

WGOP (540 AM) was a commercial radio station licensed to Pocomoke City, Maryland, United States, that aired a classic hits format. It was owned by The Waters Group, LLC, and was also broadcast over low-power translator W293DN (106.5 FM).

WGOP began broadcasting as WDVM on August 1, 1955, changing to WDMV in 1959. The station was a Top 40 outlet until switching to country music in 1980. In later years, it offered oldies music and sports talk programming. On August 18, 2022, the station was destroyed in an accidental fire; it was sold a year later. It briefly returned before leaving the air. Its broadcast license was canceled in 2026.

== History ==
On January 19, 1955, the Federal Communications Commission (FCC) approved an application for a new 500-watt, daytime-only radio station on 540 kHz in Pocomoke City, Maryland, by G. Russell Chambers, trading as Eastern Shore Broadcasting Company. WDVM began to air on August 1 and was the second radio station on the Lower Eastern Shore. It was allowed to begin 1,000-watt broadcasting in 1957 but forfeited the authorization. The call sign was changed from WDVM to WDMV in 1959, after it was purchased by Ernest Tannen. An additional facility in Salisbury was added in 1962.

Tannen sold his radio holdings, which included WDMV and stations in Annapolis and Chester, Pennsylvania, in the 1970s to devote himself to other ventures. Leisure Time Communications acquired WDMV in 1973, followed by Mesta Communications in 1978. It switched from Top 40 to country music in 1980.

WDMV was silent for several years in the mid-1990s. The station used the WDMV call letters up until July 1, 2004, when it exchanged call signs with 700 kHz in Walkersville, Maryland, to become WGOP.

In April 2015, WGOP switched formats from oldies to sports talk, branded as SportsRadio 540. Later the format changed to classic country music and then back to oldies; it continued to air sports play-by-play, including Baltimore Orioles baseball.

On August 18, 2022, WGOP was destroyed by a fire caused by a faulty electrical wire in the attic of the studio building. Fifty firefighters took three hours to put out the blaze. The building was not insured and was declared a total loss, but rebuilding was planned. On April 13, 2023, The Waters Group filed a $200,000 deal to purchase WGOP from Birach Broadcasting, along with a plan to operate WGOP under a time brokerage agreement until closing.

The FCC cancelled WGOP's license on September 3, 2026. It had previously issued a letter of inquiry to Waters after noting that the station had not operated under a valid special temporary authority since November 2024. Waters in 2025 had filed that the station had gone silent.

== Programming ==
Over the years, the station was home to several formats. It once programmed an urban gospel format, as well as oldies, and country music. It simulcast WBEY-FM 97.9 when that station operated WGOP under a local marketing agreement. The Party Line on WBEY-FM was once simulcast on WGOP, until the station went to a sports radio format. Circa late 1950s "Mama's Country Youngin" Eddie Matherly was a popular WDMV personality.

In the early 1960s the station's music format "Delmarvarama" featured "America's Best Loved Music And Song". During that era the station promoted itself as "Big Signal Radio" in reference to its 540 AM frequency which in those days covered much of the lower and mid Eastern Shore with a strong signal. Its low frequency and abundance of water in the Eastern Shore area allowed the signal to blanket up to DC's southern suburbs, down to all of the Tidewater/Virginia Beach metro and into North Carolina.

Radio shows that formerly aired on both WBEY and WGOP include The Oldies but Goodies Show on Saturday nights, The Old Country and Bluegrass Show on Sunday nights and Light and Easy Cafe on Monday nights.
