= WNJB-FM =

Simulcast of WKNZ, Harrington, Delaware
- Bridgeton, New Jersey; United States
- Frequency: 89.3 MHz
- Branding: The Bridge

Programming
- Format: Christian adult contemporary

Ownership
- Owner: The Bridge of Hope, Inc.

History
- First air date: 1996
- Call sign meaning: New Jersey Bridgeton

Technical information
- Licensing authority: FCC
- Facility ID: 48934
- Class: A
- ERP: 1 watt horizontal; 2,500 watts vertical
- HAAT: 60 m (197 ft) horizontal; 67 m (220 ft) vertical
- Transmitter coordinates: 39°27′35.4″N 75°9′26.7″W

Links
- Public license information: Public file; LMS
- Webcast: Listen Live
- Website: wearethebridge.org

WNJB-FM (89.3 FM) is a radio station licensed to Bridgeton, New Jersey. The station is owned by The Bridge of Hope, Inc., and simulcasts the Christian adult contemporary programming of WKNZ in Harrington, Delaware.

== History ==
The station was formerly owned and operated by the New Jersey Network (NJN). NJN's radio network began operation May 20, 1991, when WNJT-FM in Trenton signed on. Eight other stations would be established over the following seventeen years.

On June 6, 2011, the New Jersey Public Broadcasting Authority agreed to sell five FM stations in southern New Jersey to WHYY. The transaction was announced by Governor Chris Christie, as part of his long-term goal to end State-subsidized public broadcasting. The five stations previously belonged to New Jersey Network's statewide radio service. WHYY assumed control of the stations through a management agreement on July 1, 2011, pending Federal Communications Commission (FCC) approval for the acquisition; at that point, the stations began to carry the WHYY-FM schedule.

In November 2022, WHYY, Inc. announced it would sell WNJB-FM to The Bridge of Hope Inc., a non-profit Christian radio broadcaster based in Harrington, Delaware. In December 2022, The Bridge of Hope announced the purchase. The sale, at a price of $125,000, was approved by the FCC, and consummated on January 26, 2023; the station changed formats in February 2023.
