= WICO-FM =

Simulcast of WOWZ-FM
- Snow Hill, Maryland; United States
- Broadcast area: Delmarva
- Frequency: 101.1 MHz
- Branding: Wow 99.3 & 101.1

Programming
- Format: Classic country

Ownership
- Owner: A. Wray Fitch and Greg Bojko; (GSB Media, LLC)
- Sister stations: WBEY-FM; WCTG; WVES

History
- First air date: 2002 (as WQMR)
- Former call signs: WQMR (2000–2011); WAMS-FM (2011–2014); WRYD (2014–2016); WSUX-FM (2016–2017)

Technical information
- Licensing authority: FCC
- Facility ID: 88291
- Class: A
- ERP: 1,200 watts
- HAAT: 149 meters
- Transmitter coordinates: 38°12′57.4″N 75°19′10.7″W

Links
- Public license information: Public file; LMS
- Webcast: Listen live
- Website: wowthatscountry.com

WICO-FM (101.1 FM) is a radio station licensed to Snow Hill, Maryland, United States. The station serves the Delmarva Peninsula. The station is owned by A. Wray Fitch and Greg Bojko, through licensee GSB Media, LLC.

== History ==
From approximately 2002 through the end of 2010, 101.1 was WQMR, a talk radio station. Programming on WQMR included The Radio Factor, The Sean Hannity Show, Mark Levin, Dennis Miller, and Imus in the Morning, with a local show, Power Talk, filling the late morning time slot. When that format ended on January 10, 2011, the station began a prolonged stretch of changing formats every few months, which continued through 2017, often trading formats with sister stations such as FM 105.1, AM 1590, AM 1280 and FM 87.7. Jack FM adult hits, gospel, Nash Icon country music, mainstream/alternative rock, and The True Oldies Channel have been among the numerous formats that briefly aired on the station from 2011 to 2017.

The most recent format change was November 28, 2017. Since then, WICO-FM has simulcast WOWZ-FM 99.3 from Accomac, Virginia, branded as "Wow 99.3 & 101.1".
