= WIBG-FM =

Radio station in Avalon, New Jersey, US

Avalon, New Jersey; United States
- Broadcast area: Atlantic City–Cape May
- Frequency: 94.3 MHz
- Branding: Wibbage FM 94.3

Programming
- Format: Classic hits

Ownership
- Owner: WIBG, LLC; (WIBG, LLC)
- Sister stations: WWAC, WMID, WCMC

History
- First air date: March 29, 1976; 49 years ago
- Former call signs: WWOC (1976–1992); WXNJ (1992–1993); WWOC (1993–2001); WWZK (2001–2005); WILW (2005 -2009)
- Call sign meaning: Tribute to the original Philadelphia station which held the calls; original meaning was "I believe in God" as that station was founded by a church, but eventually downplayed to sound like "wibbage" phonetically

Technical information
- Licensing authority: FCC
- Facility ID: 16910
- Class: A
- ERP: 6,000 watts
- HAAT: 91 meters
- Transmitter coordinates: 39°13′45.00″N 74°40′54.00″W

Links
- Public license information: Public file; LMS
- Webcast: Listen live
- Website: www.wibg.com

WIBG-FM (94.3 FM, "Wibbage 94.3") is a radio station broadcasting a classic hits music format. WIBG is licensed to Avalon, New Jersey, United States. The station is owned by WIBG Limited Liability Company and features local programming. Its studios are in Ocean City, New Jersey and its transmitter is located west of the city.

== History ==
The station signed on the air March 29, 1976, as WWOC with a beautiful music format until March 27, 1992, when it was changed to WXNJ. On February 3, 1993, the station's call sign was reverted to WWOC; on March 3, 2001, to WWZK; on February 17, 2005, to WILW; and on August 19, 2009, to the current WIBG-FM.

Former logo

The programming is Classic Hits of the 80's, with songs from the 60s and 70s sprinkled in. Using a personality approach reminiscent of the "WIBBAGE" format from the Philadelphia station of the 50s, 60s and 70s (that station is now WNTP (990)). WIBG-FM transmits on 94.3 MHz.

The call sign changed in August 2009 from WILW commensurate with a relocation of the transmitter site from Swainton (Middle Township), New Jersey, to Palermo (Upper Township), New Jersey, and doubling of transmission power to 6,000 Watts. Construction of the new transmitter was completed in early November 2009. The station coverage then reached both Cape May and Atlantic Counties along with parts of Ocean and Cumberland Counties, whereas before the station only had a strong signal in Cape May County. This was followed by another signal increase in August 2023 further strengthening the station's signal in Atlantic City, Brigantine and Long Beach Island.

The Philly WIBBAGE legacy remains a very powerful brand among tens of thousands of listeners each day. Owner and News Director Rick Brancadora began his radio ownership in 1992 with WIBG, now the most powerful AM broadcast station in the Atlantic City-Cape May markets.
