= WCMC (AM) =

Simulcast of WMID, Atlantic City
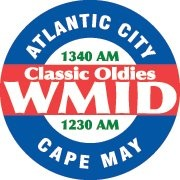
- Wildwood, New Jersey; United States
- Broadcast area: Cape May, New Jersey
- Frequency: 1230 kHz
- Branding: 1340 WMID

Programming
- Format: Oldies

Ownership
- Owner: The Jersey Giant WMID, LLC
- Sister stations: WMID; WIBG-FM; WWAC

History
- First air date: 1951
- Call sign meaning: Cape May County

Technical information
- Licensing authority: FCC
- Facility ID: 70259
- Class: C
- Power: 1,000 watts unlimited
- Transmitter coordinates: 39°0′9.4″N 74°48′44.6″W

Links
- Public license information: Public file; LMS
- Webcast: Listen live
- Website: www.classicoldieswmid.com

WCMC (1230 AM) is a radio station broadcasting an oldies format. Licensed to Wildwood, New Jersey, United States, the station is owned by The Jersey Giant WMID, LLC. Its studios are located in Ocean City, and its transmitter is located on West 19th Avenue in North Wildwood.

WCMC carries the live radio broadcast of the Philadelphia Phillies. Prior to 2010, the station carried an adult standards format and featured programming from Citadel Media's Timeless satellite feed. In 2010, the station began simulcasting sister station WMID.

In September 2023, Equity Communications sold WMID and WCMC to Rick Brancadora under the name The Jersey Giant WMID, LLC. The sale took effect in mid-December 2023.

== See also ==
- WMID
