= WKNZ =

Radio station in Harrington, Delaware, United States

- Harrington, Delaware; United States
- Broadcast area: Dover, Delaware
- Frequency: 88.7 MHz
- Branding: The Bridge

Programming
- Format: Christian adult contemporary

Ownership
- Owner: The Bridge of Hope, Inc.
- Sister stations: WNJB-FM; WNJH; WNKZ-FM

History
- First air date: 2009

Technical information
- Licensing authority: FCC
- Facility ID: 90270
- Class: B1
- ERP: 25,000 watts (vert.)
- HAAT: 98.1 meters (322 ft)
- Transmitter coordinates: 38°53′30″N 75°34′48″W
- Translators: 94.9 W235DD (Ocean City, Maryland); 100.1 W261AE (Templeville, Maryland)
- Repeaters: 89.3 WNJB-FM (Bridgeton, New Jersey); 92.5 WNKZ-FM (Pocomoke City, Maryland); 105.5 WNJH (Cape May Court House, New Jersey)

Links
- Public license information: Public file; LMS
- Webcast: Listen live
- Website: www.wearethebridge.org

WKNZ (88.7 FM) is a non-commercial educational broadcast radio station licensed to Harrington, Delaware, United States. WKNZ is owned and operated by The Bridge of Hope, Inc. WKNZ programming can also be heard on WNJB-FM in Bridgeton, New Jersey; WNJH in Cape May, New Jersey; WNKZ-FM in Pocomoke City, Maryland; and on FM translators on 100.1 (W261AE) in Templeville, Maryland, and on 94.9 (W235DD) in Ocean City, Maryland.

== Programming ==
WKNZ broadcasts an adult Contemporary Christian music format, serving Central Delmarva. The primary focus of the station is to bring people of different Christian denominations together, to strengthen families and churches through positive and uplifting music and to offer hope to people trying to find their way through difficult situations.

== History ==
This station received its original construction permit from the Federal Communications Commission on January 25, 2008. The new station was assigned the call letters WKNZ by the FCC on June 9, 2008.

In July 2009 the station unveiled its new name, logo and slogan: 88.7fm The Bridge, Connecting, Strengthening. Originally planned to launch in the first quarter of 2010, WKNZ began regular broadcast operations on Tuesday, December 7, 2010, at 10:00 a.m.
