= WOWZ-FM =

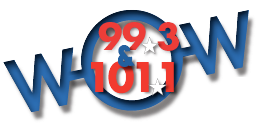
- Accomac, Virginia; United States
- Broadcast area: Eastern Shore of Virginia
- Frequency: 99.3 MHz
- Branding: Wow 99.3 & 101.1

Programming
- Format: Classic country

Ownership
- Owner: GSB Media, LLC

History
- First air date: 1990 (as WVES)
- Former call signs: WVES (1990–2017)
- Call sign meaning: "Wow"

Technical information
- Licensing authority: FCC
- Facility ID: 18384
- Class: B1
- ERP: 22,000 watts
- HAAT: 105 meters (344 ft)
- Transmitter coordinates: 37°47′5.4″N 75°36′14.7″W
- Repeaters: 87.7 WOWZ-LD (Salisbury, Maryland); 101.1 WICO-FM (Snow Hill, Maryland)

Links
- Public license information: Public file; LMS
- Webcast: Listen live
- Website: wowthatscountry.com

WOWZ-FM is a classic country formatted broadcast radio station licensed to Accomac, Virginia, serving the Eastern Shore of Virginia. WOWZ-FM is owned and operated by GSB Media.

== History ==
On November 28, 2017, the then-WVES changed their format to classic country, branded as "Wow 99.3 & 101.1" in reflection of its simulcast with WICO-FM 101.1 in Snow Hill, Maryland. On December 12, 2017, WVES swapped call signs with WOWZ-FM 101.5 to go with the "Wow" branding.

The station was owned by Stephen Marks' Chincoteague Broadcasting Corporation from 1998, when he purchased it from Eastern Shore Broadcasting for $350,000, until his death on May 11, 2022. In April 2023, his widow Mary Marks sold WOWZ-FM to GSB Broadcasting, which had been programming it since October 2017, for $100,000.
