= WVES (FM) =

Radio station in Chincoteague, Virginia

Simulcast of WCTG, West Pocomoke, Maryland
- Chincoteague, Virginia; United States
- Broadcast area: Chincoteague, Virginia; Accomac, Virginia; Pocomoke City, Maryland
- Frequency: 101.5 MHz
- Branding: 96.5 & 101.5 CTG

Programming
- Format: Adult hits
- Affiliations: CBS News Radio

Ownership
- Owner: GSB Broadcasting; (Jackman Holding Company, LLC)
- Sister stations: WCTG; WICO-FM

History
- First air date: August 29, 2016 (as WOWZ)
- Former call signs: WOWZ (2016–2017); WIEZ (4/2017-5/2017); WOWZ-FM (5/2017-12/2017)

Technical information
- Licensing authority: FCC
- Facility ID: 198743
- Class: A
- ERP: 2,900 watts
- HAAT: 101 meters (331 ft)
- Transmitter coordinates: 37°55′14.4″N 75°23′5.7″W

Links
- Public license information: Public file; LMS
- Webcast: Listen live
- Website: ctgvariety.com

WVES (101.5 FM) is a broadcast radio station licensed to Chincoteague, Virginia, serving Chincoteague and Accomac, Virginia, and Pocomoke City, Maryland. WVES is owned and operated by GSB Broadcasting.

WVES' programming was also heard on the audio feed of "Franken-FM" WOWZ-LP, VHF analog channel 6, a low-power television station in the market. This could also be heard on an FM radio tuned to 87.7 MHz, since the audio portion of the analog signal lied at 87.75 MHz. WOWZ is currently silent with a permit to switch to digital.

WVES simulcasts the adult hits format of WCTG (96.5 FM) in West Pocomoke, Maryland, branded as "96.5 & 101.5 CTG".

== History ==
WVES signed on for the first time on August 29, 2016, as WOWZ and began stunting with a "wheel of formats". At 10 AM the next day, the station officially launched with a country music format, branded as "Wow 101-5". The first song on "Wow" was "Gone Country" by Alan Jackson. The station changed its call sign to WIEZ on April 3, 2017, and to WOWZ-FM on May 5, 2017.

On November 28, 2017, WOWZ-FM and WOWZ-LP dropped the "Wow" country format (which moved to WVES (99.3 FM) in Accomac, Virginia; and WICO-FM 101.1 in Snow Hill, Maryland) and began stunting with Christmas music as "Christmas 101.5". On December 12, 2017, the station assumed the WVES call sign as part of a call sign swap. On December 26, 2017, WVES flipped to rhythmic adult top 40 as "101.5 The Mix", with an emphasis on current rhythmic contemporary hits and upbeat recurrents from the 1990s and 2000s.

On October 26, 2018, WVES changed its format from rhythmic adult top 40 to a simulcast of adult hits-formatted WCTG (96.5 FM) from West Pocomoke, Maryland.
