= WMID =

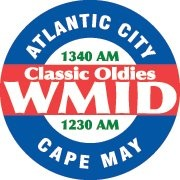
- Atlantic City, New Jersey; United States
- Broadcast area: Atlantic County, New Jersey
- Frequency: 1340 kHz
- Branding: 1340 WMID

Programming
- Language: English
- Format: Oldies

Ownership
- Owner: The Jersey Giant WMID, LLC
- Sister stations: WCMC; WIBG-FM; WWAC

History
- First air date: May 30, 1947

Technical information
- Licensing authority: FCC
- Facility ID: 1307
- Class: C
- Power: 890 watts unlimited
- Transmitter coordinates: 39°22′35.4″N 74°27′6.5″W

Links
- Public license information: Public file; LMS
- Webcast: Listen live
- Website: www.classicoldieswmid.com

WMID (1340 kHz) is a radio station licensed to Atlantic City, New Jersey, which plays "the classic oldies". Owned by The Jersey Giant WMID, LLC. The station's studios are located in Ocean City, and its transmitter site is located on Murray Avenue in Atlantic City.

== Programming ==
The motto of the station is: "It's the Music you grew up with on the Station you grew up with: AM 1340 Classic Oldies WMID". The station focuses on the history of music and radio when rock and roll was on AM radio. The mission of WMID is to re-create the old days when the memorable sound of rock & roll dominated the AM frequency. WMID plays the songs and voices – the timeless music that is never left the rock and roll generation – all day and all night.

== History ==
WMID began broadcasting May 30, 1947. It was the 400th affiliate of the Mutual Broadcasting System, and operated on 1340 kHz with a power of 250 watts.

In the 1950s, WMID broadcast from a small studio in the old Brighton Hotel that stood in the beach block of Indiana Avenue, across the street from the Claridge Hotel. The Brighton was torn down to make way for the Sands Casino, itself now closed and demolished. Since the 1960s the station has broadcast from studios adjacent to its tower site at Ohio and Murray Avenues, just off U.S. Route 30 next to the Jersey-Atlantic Wind Farm.

During the fifties, sixties, and early to mid-seventies, WMID was the dominant Top 40 station in the Atlantic City area. In its peak years as a Top 40 station in the early to mid-seventies, it was known as "The Jersey Giant", although for a while after the introduction of gambling in Atlantic City, it labeled itself "the Lucky 13". Its play during its peak years was extremely formatted, with the number one song of the week repeated every two hours, with new songs being labeled "future giants", and, in keeping with the city's resort image, with oldies being labeled "souvenirs". The station presented a locally produced "top 40 countdown" every Monday night. The station also boasted a strong jingle package with a classic "WMID, Atlantic City" station ID at the top of the hour, with the disc jockey introduction, "From the Jersey Giant, Jackson Chase (or other disc jockey)" once an hour, with the introduction of the number one song, "WMID, Giant Play One, Play One, Play One," and with other catchy jingles, such as, "The World Comes Here to Play, 1340, WMID", "Summer at the Jersey Shore, 1340, Atlantic City, WMID". News was limited several minutes leading to the top of the hour from ABC's American Contemporary Radio. In summary, at its peak, WMID in the early to mid-seventies was one of the most professionally run and cleanly produced small to medium-market stations in the country. As AM broadcasting listenership declined in the late seventies, the station went through a series of format changes (including Adult Contemporary and Big Band) before settling on the oldies format.

From January 2, 2012, until March 2021, WMID was the Atlantic City affiliate for The Rush Limbaugh Show.

The station briefly aired in 2017 on W230AA at 93.9 MHz FM before W230AA switched to WSJO-HD2.

In September 2023, Equity Communications sold WMID and WCMC to Rick Brancadora under the name The Jersey Giant WMID, LLC. The sale took effect in mid-December 2023.

== See also ==
- WCMC (AM)
