= WSUX (AM) =

- Seaford, Delaware; United States
- Broadcast area: Western Sussex County
- Frequency: 1280 kHz
- Branding: La Z Mx Radio

Programming
- Format: Spanish Regional

Ownership
- Owner: Vladimir Rosales

History
- First air date: 1955
- Former call signs: WSUS (1955); WSUX (1955–1976); WSFD (1976–1981); WSUX (1981–1990); WECY (1990–1995); WJPY (1995–1998); WJWK (1998–2015)
- Call sign meaning: Sussex County

Technical information
- Licensing authority: FCC
- Facility ID: 4339
- Class: B
- Power: 840 watts (day); 211 watts (night)
- Transmitter coordinates: 38°36′47.4″N 75°35′10.7″W
- Translator: 93.9 W230CO (Seaford)

Links
- Public license information: Public file; LMS
- Webcast: www.lazmxradio.com

WSUX (1280 AM) is a radio station licensed to serve Seaford, Delaware. It airs a Spanish-language format. WSUX also airs on 93.9 FM using the FM translator W230CO.

The station has been assigned these call letters by the Federal Communications Commission (FCC) since October 14, 2015.

On July 12, 2017, WSUX and W242AV went dark. Nothing listed as to why on the FCC website, but representatives from its sister station, 101.1 Jack FM in Salisbury, noted ownership of the Seaford station.

On August 14, 2017, WSUX and W242AV starting playing Spanish music as La Z Mx Radio, "The Letter that ignites your music". Effective September 11, 2017, translator W242AV moved to 93.9 FM as W230CO.

== Translators ==
Call sign	Frequency	City of license	FID	ERP (W)	HAAT	Class	FCC info
W230CO	(93.9 MHz) FM	Seaford, Delaware	146617	250	91 m (299 ft)	D	LMS
