= WCHR =

WCHR can refer to:

- WCHR (AM), a radio station at 1040 AM located in Flemington, New Jersey
- WCHR-FM, a radio station at 105.7 FM located in Manahawkin, New Jersey
- WCHR, a code for people with reduced mobility, requiring assistance during flights
