= Persons with reduced mobility legislation =

The European Union Persons with Reduced Mobility (PRM) legislation is intended to ensure that Persons with Reduced Mobility (whether disabled, elderly or otherwise) traveling via public transport, whether by air, land or sea, should have equal access to travel as compared to travelers with unrestricted mobility. Travel providers are compelled to provide and install sufficient access facilities to enable Passengers with Reduced Mobility to enjoy similar access to other passengers (where feasible and with certain safety exemptions).

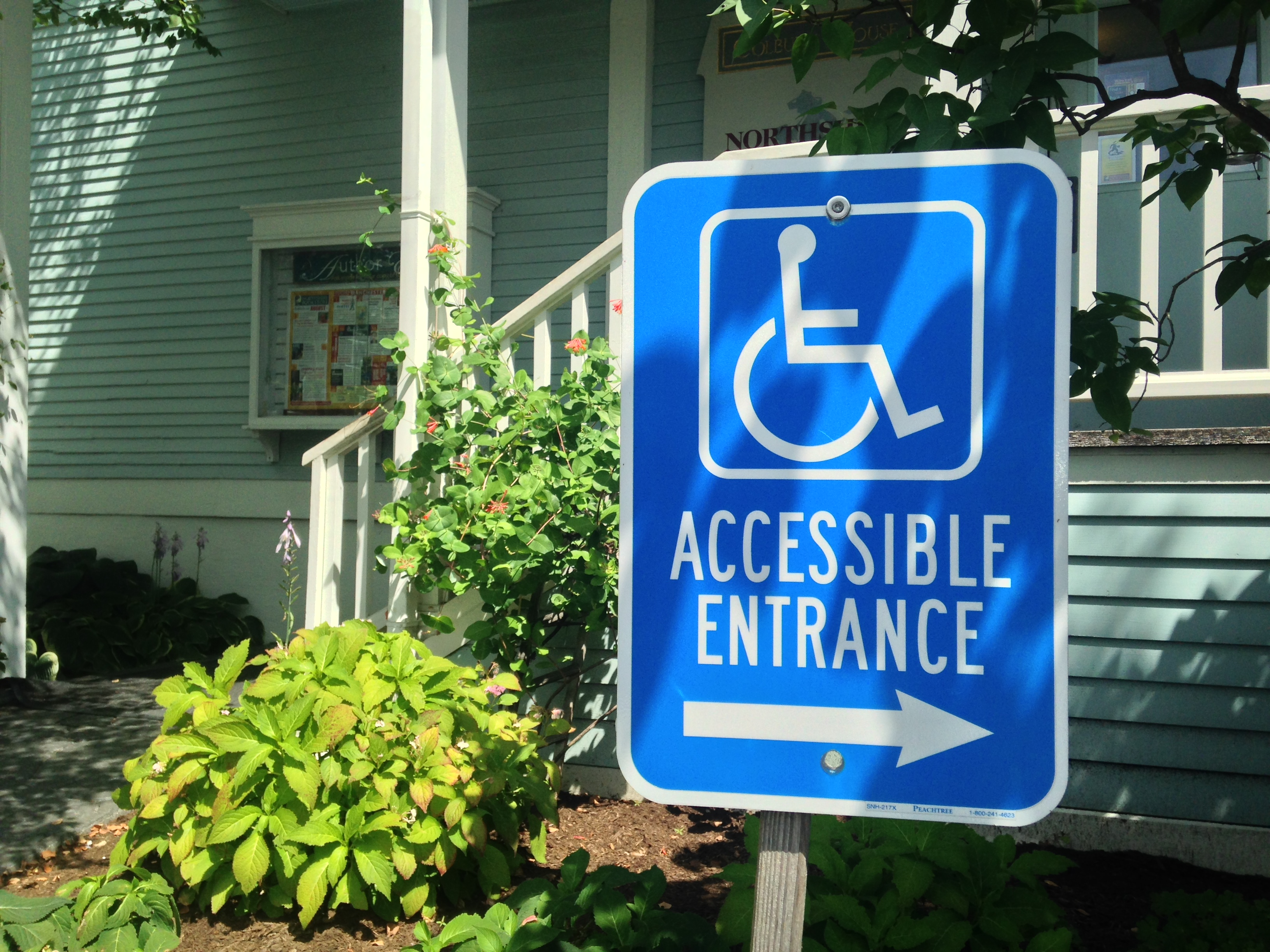
A sign indicating the location of the wheelchair ramp and entrance.

PRM legislation applies to any travel within, into, or out of European Union and European Free Trade Association (EFTA) countries), with Regulation (EU) 1107/2006 covering air travel, (EU) 1177/2010 covering maritime travel and inland waterways, (EU) 1300/2014 covering rail travel and (EU) No 181/2011 covering bus and coach travel. Each member state of the EU is required to implement the PRM rights in national legislation and establish a national enforcement body, with any breaches covered by compensation regulation (EC) No 261/2004.

== Air travel ==
In the United Kingdom (EU) 1107/2006 is implemented by the by Civil Aviation (Access to Air Travel for Disabled Persons and Persons with Reduced Mobility) Regulations 2007. The national enforcement body was initially assigned as the Equality and Human Rights Commission (EHRC), but was later moved to the Civil Aviation Authority, who subsequently delegated responsibility to an airline industry dispute resolution body.

A record 3.7 million passengers were assisted at 31 UK airports between 1 April 2018 and 31 March 2019. Since 2014 the number of passengers assisted increased by 49%, while overall passenger numbers increased by 25%. This PRM growth reflects similar trends across the European Union which has experienced year on year growth. PRM traffic has been hugely disrupted by the COVID-19 pandemic which saw 48% airports state full closure in Ozion's PRM Impact and Recovery Survey during the month of April, followed by 29% in May. PRM passengers are expected to be the last group of passengers to resume air travel due to their high-risk status.

== Rail infrastructure ==
In the UK the "Access for All" programme of rail infrastructure improvements began in 2006, designed to allow more accessible trains and stations for disabled passengers and passengers facing mobility restraints. Improvements include accessible WC facilities, automatic doors, tactile paving, lifts and ramps, and originally targeted over 1500 stations in the UK for completion in 2024, however planned implementations were repeatedly cut. As of 2020 the access situation remains extremely variable, with only 61% of stations offering level access to the platform. A significant proportion of UK rolling stock was legally required to be replaced by the end of 2019 as failing to meet accessibility standards under legislation dating from 2010, however in December 2019 the government was forced to issue a waiver allowing over 1200 inaccessible carriages to remain in service as many of the Train Operating Companies had left their replacement programmes until the last minute, and then seen them delayed.

== Ferry travel ==
Travelling by ferry remains a problem for Persons with Reduced Mobility as most passenger ships currently operating were designed prior to the current European and British legislation on access. Many ferry companies cannot provide adequate accessible facilities due to the design of the ship. Requests to travel from persons with reduced mobility, can be refused on the grounds of safety, under a legal requirement that all passengers need to be evacuated from a vessel in less than 30 minutes.

== Buses and coaches ==
In the UK accessibility of buses and coaches is covered by the Public Service Vehicle Access Regulations (PSVAR), however the UK government initially derogated from the EU requirement for all drivers to receive disability awareness training for a period of five years. In late 2019 the government issued a waiver allowing buses and coaches used for transport to and from schools to continue to ignore PSVAR access requirements that would have come into force at the start of 2020 and at the start of 2020 was consulting on how to address the inaccessibility of the long-distance coach fleet when used for rail-replacement bus services, which brings coaches used for such services under the stricter train accessibility regulations.

== Special Service Request (SSR) codes ==
SSR codes relate specifically to assistance offered to passengers with reduced mobility. These codes are used by the majority of airlines

- WCHR Wheelchair assistance required; passenger can walk short distance up or down stairs.
- WCHS Wheelchair assistance required; passenger can walk short distance, but not up or down stairs.
- WCHC Wheelchair required; passenger cannot walk any distance and will require the aisle chair to board.
- WCOB On-board aisle wheelchair requested (for use during flight).
- WCMP Passenger is traveling with a manual wheelchair.
- WCBD Passenger is traveling with a dry cell battery-powered wheelchair.
- WCBW Passenger is traveling with a wet cell battery-powered wheelchair.
- BLND Passenger is blind or has reduced vision.
- DEAF Passenger is deaf or hard of hearing.
- DPNA Disabled Passenger with Intellectual or Developmental Disability Needing Assistance
- ESAN Passenger is traveling with an emotional support animal.
- EXST Passenger requires an extra seat due to body size.
- MAAS Meet-and-assist. Used by some airlines to identify passengers with intellectual disabilities.
- MEDA Medical case. Used by some airlines to identify passengers needing oxygen.
- OXYG Passenger will require oxygen.
- PETC Passenger is traveling with a pet in cabin.
- PNUT Passenger is allergic to peanut dust.
- PPOC Passenger is traveling with a portable oxygen concentrator.
- STCR Passenger is traveling on a stretcher.
- SVAN Passenger is traveling with a service animal.

== See also ==
- Accessibility
- American Coalition of Citizens with Disabilities (ACCD)
- Americans with Disabilities Act
- Assistance for airline passengers with disabilities
- Assistive Technology
- Convention on the Rights of Persons with Disabilities
- Disability rights movement
- Disability Discrimination Act 1995
- Frank Bowe - Disability rights activist
- Mobility aid
- Rehabilitation Act of 1973
