= Aisle chair =

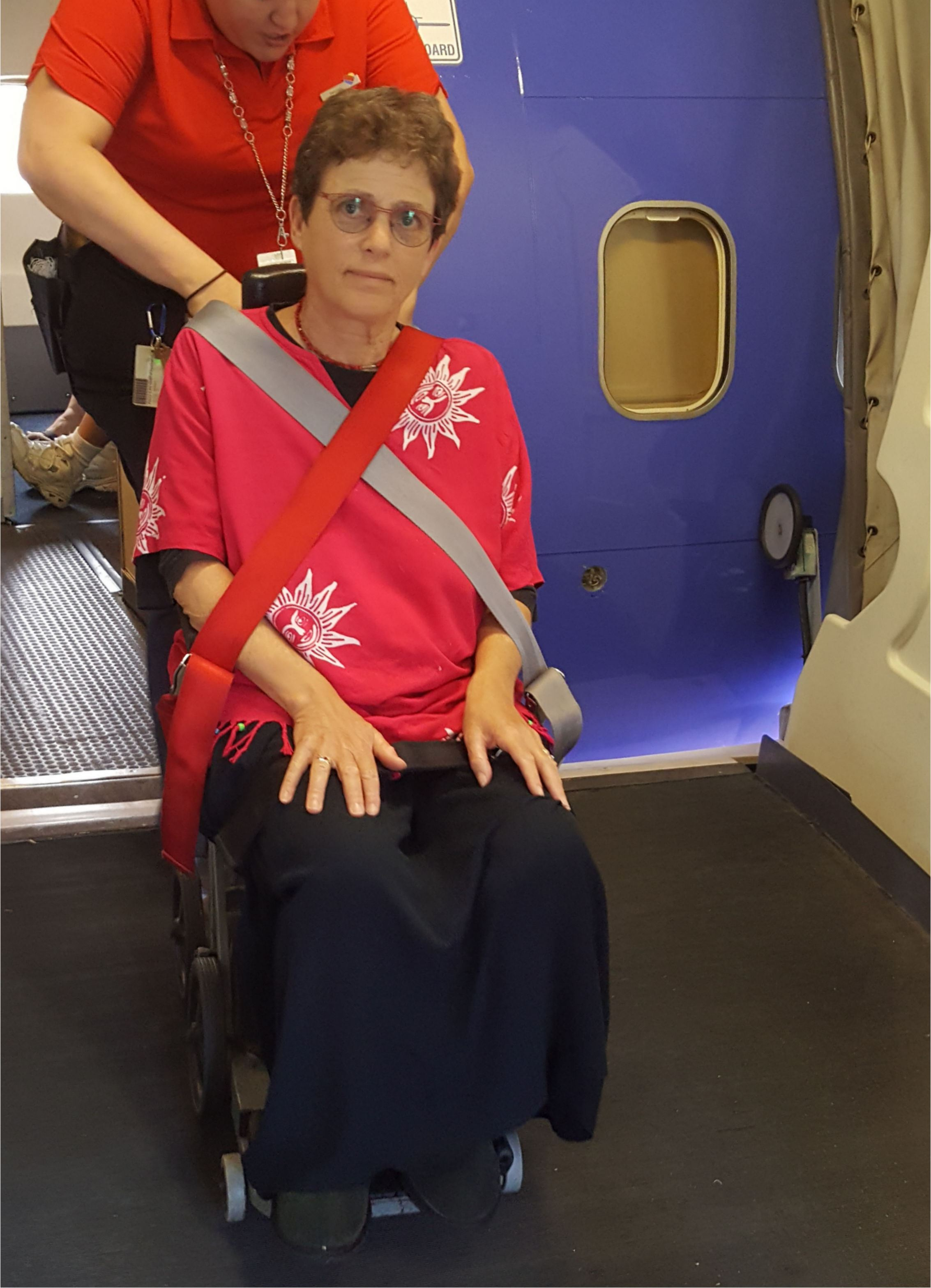
A passenger strapped in with seatbelts sitting on an aisle chair

An aisle chair, also known as a straight or high back wheelchair is a specially modified wheelchair used by airline operators and airports for use in narrow spaces such as airplane aisles and lavatories, along with extra assistance for boarding and deplaning. Aisle chairs can either be stored on board an aircraft in a designated space or kept in storage on airport grounds. For aisle chairs stored on board, they are used in-flight as mobility aids for passengers who are otherwise immobile without assistance.

== History ==
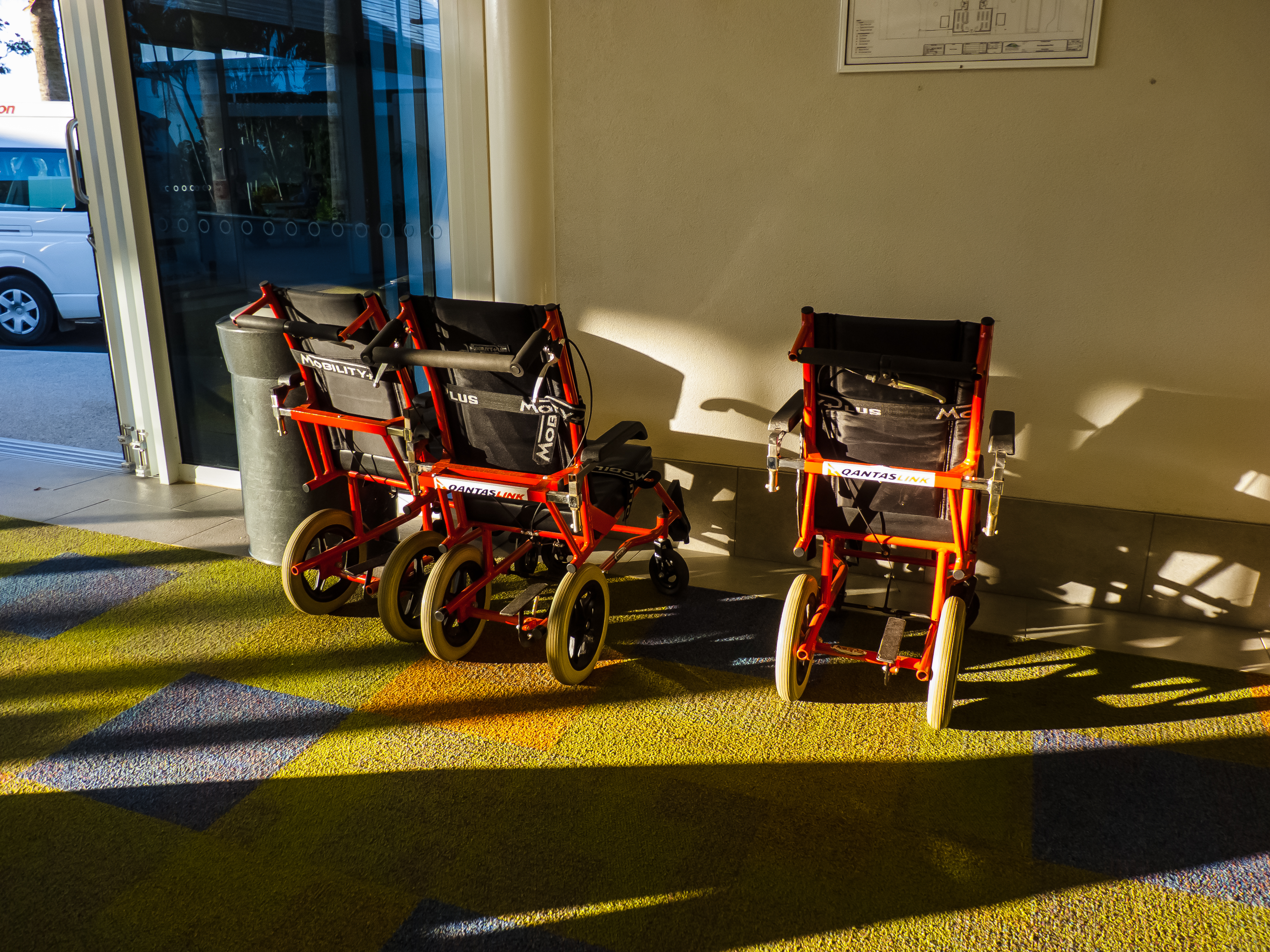
A set of aisle chairs in Bundaberg Airport, Queensland.

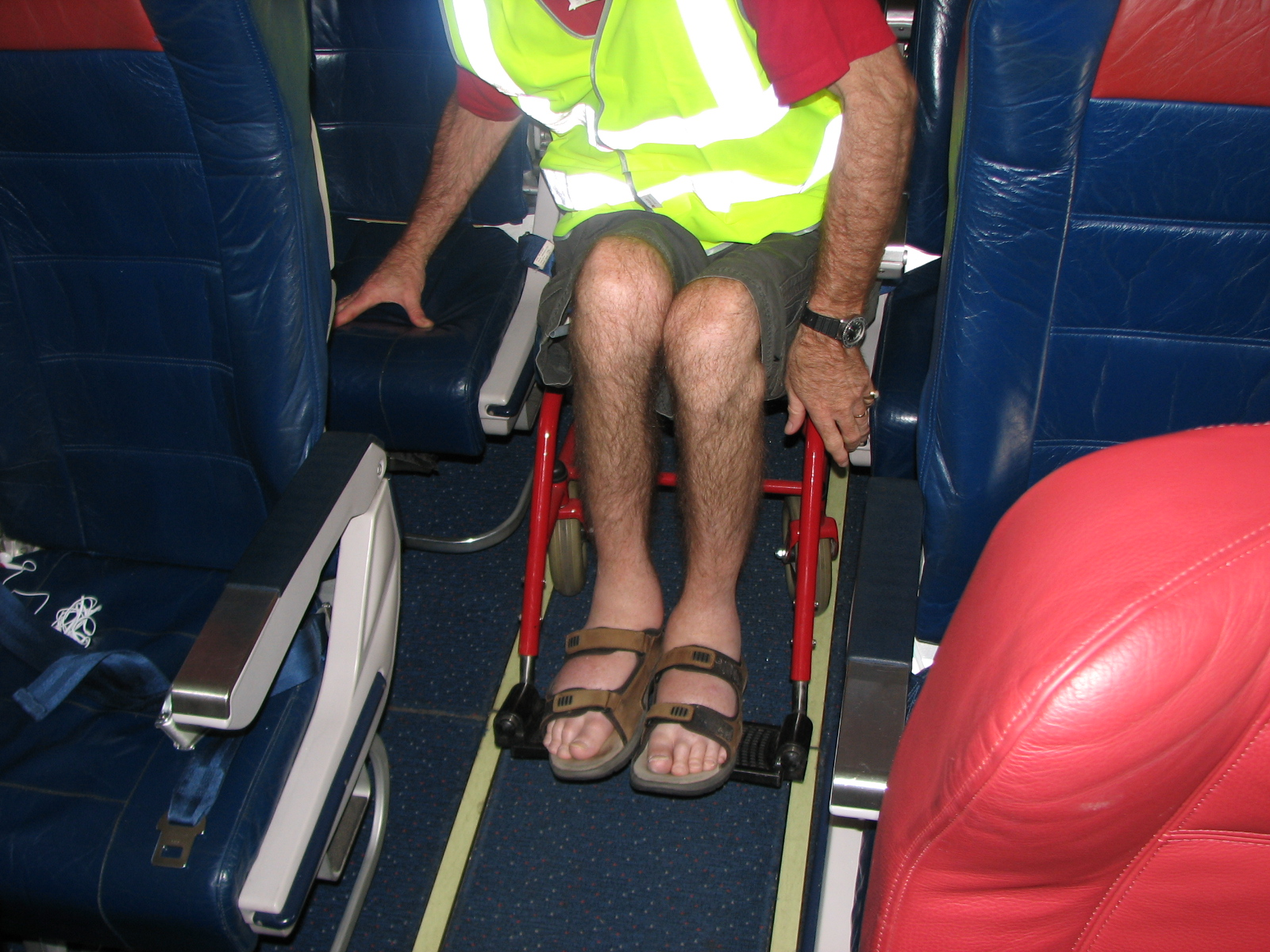
An aisle chair inside a Virgin Australia aircraft being used to transport a man to his seat.

Prior to the popularization of aisle chairs, disabled passengers often faced obstacles during boarding, deplaning and in-flight. The restrictive space of the aircraft often meant that frequent transfers to and from wheelchairs were often commonplace, causing discomfort for passengers and reducing their independence. Cabin crew often have to allocate their time to helping less physically abled passengers, creating a challenging environment especially if there were no wheelchairs on board.

The aisle chair was therefore designed to facilitate boarding and assist with movement for passengers with limited to no mobility inside the cabin. As conventional wheelchairs were too large for the narrow aisles of passenger airliners, they were created as a solution to enable mobility-handicapped passengers to move around for necessary purposes, such as using the lavatory or disembarking.

There have been recent innovations to the aisle chair, such as a new seat transfer assist mechanism which makes use of guide rails to secure the aisle chair to the seat. It can also be used to transfer passengers backwards into their seat given enough forward legroom.

Most airlines also have on-board aisle chairs for immobile passengers to use during flight.
