= Assistance for airline passengers with disabilities =

Assistance provided by airlines

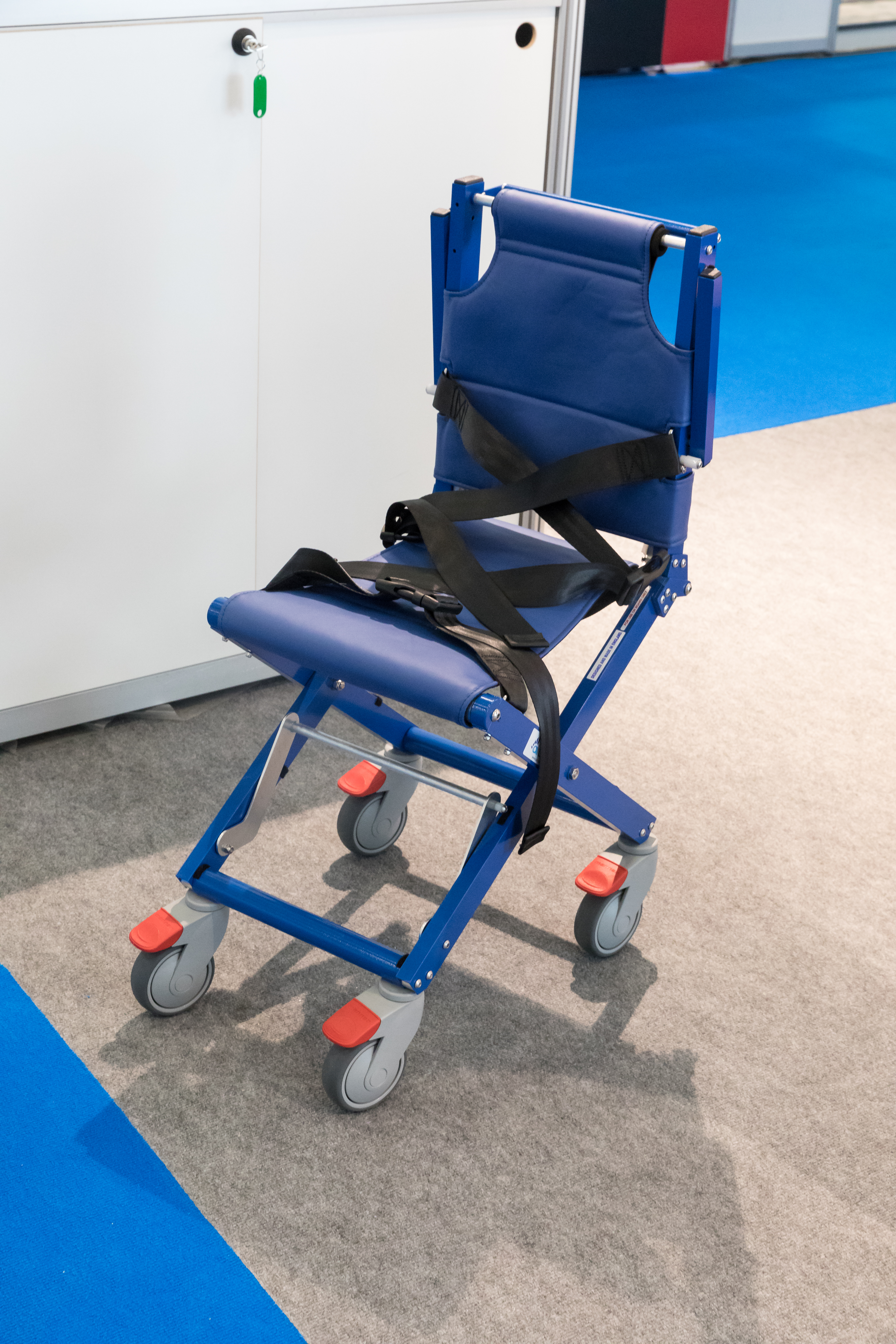
Aisle Chair used for moving persons with reduced mobility aboard aircraft

There are no worldwide uniform standards regulating the provision of assistance for airline passengers with disabilities. Different regions have varying levels of regulation regarding disability assistance at airports. American regulations place the responsibility on the airlines, while the European Union's rules place the responsibility mainly on the airport authorities and in some regions such as South America, regulations are unclear. This has caused concern for the International Air Transport Association (IATA) about the difficulties caused by inconsistent regulations.

Wheelchair assistance at airports are typically provided on request through a call or a digital or physical form. Some airlines also have size restrictions on wheelchairs due to strict weight limits. Check-in procedures vary by airline and airport. Certain types of wheelchairs, however, can be checked in such as collapsible wheelchairs, scooters and battery-powered wheelchairs that can be operated by the user themselves.

== IATA ticket codes ==
Specific IATA codes are used on the flight ticket to indicate the kind of assistance the person needs, such as wheelchair assistance inside the terminal, between the terminal and the plane, climbing up/down to/from the plane, and moving within the plane.

Code	Meaning
WCHR (Wheel Chair Ramp)	Passenger can use stairs but needs a wheelchair or other means of transport for longer distances.
WCHS (Wheel Chair Stair)	Passenger cannot use stairs and needs a wheelchair or other means of transport for longer distances.
WCHC (Wheel Chair Cabin)	Passenger needs a wheelchair and may require additional assistance into the cabin of the aircraft.
DEAF (Deaf)	Passenger with hearing loss.
BLND (Blind)	Passenger with vision loss.
DEAF/BLND (Deaf/Blind)	Passenger with hearing and vision loss.
DPNA	Passenger with developmental or intellectual disability.

== IATA additional codes ==
Code	Meaning
WCBD (Dry battery wheelchair)	Wheelchair has a dry electrically-powered battery.
WCBW (Wet cell battery wheelchair)	Wheelchair must be handled properly to prevent battery leakage.
WCMP (Manual power wheelchair)	Wheelchairs that require the assistance of another person to operate.
WCLB (Lithium ion wheelchair)	Wheelchairs that have lithium ion batteries. Possible fire hazard.
WCLX (Removable Lithium ion battery)	Wheelchairs that have removable lithium ion batteries. Possible fire hazard.
WCOB (On-board wheelchair)	Passenger requires assistance using aisle chair stored on board the aircraft.

== Physical Disabilities ==
=== WCHR ===
Passengers requiring a WCHR (Wheelchair on Ramp) status are able to use stairs/steps, walk short distances and are able to make their way to their assigned seat but may require mobility aids or other forms of assistance for more strenuous activities like climbing stairs and walking long distances. However, most WCHR passengers still require additional assistance as walking for prolonged periods may cause discomfort for them.

=== WCHS ===
This category is sometimes merged with WCHR for operational convenience and is mainly for passengers who cannot climb steps/stairs but are able to walk to their assigned seat. At most airports they are given the same accommodations as those who are in the WCHR category.

=== WCHC ===
Passengers that require WCHC (Wheel Chair Cabin) wheelchairs are completely immobile and cannot walk or move without significant assistance. Airport authorities often provide a specialized wheelchair known as an aisle chair that has extra modifications to allow greater flexibility as compared to normal wheelchairs. They can often be utilized in tight spaces such as airplane cabins and lavatories.

== Accessibility barriers in air travel for wheelchair users ==
While the U.S. Department of Transportation (DOT) has been working to improve airport accessibility, travelers with disabilities continue to encounter significant barriers. These barriers may negatively impact physical and emotional health. Current aircraft designs and boarding procedures can lead to practices that some passengers perceive as dehumanizing, such as needing to transfer from their personal wheelchair to an aisle chair, being maneuvered over fixed armrests, boarding before all other passengers, and exiting last. These experiences have been reported to contribute to feelings of segregation.

Wheelchair users may also be required to wait in areas that lack adequate accommodations, such as accessible seating or dining options. Airline personnel may not always have the knowledge to support passengers with physical disabilities effectively. During the boarding process, individuals who use wheelchairs are typically lifted into an aisle chair and then into their seat, which may pose a risk of injury. Their personal wheelchair is treated as checked baggage and stored in the aircraft's cargo hold. On average, U.S. airlines damage between 10,000 and 15,000 wheelchairs annually—about 1.5% of all mobility devices checked. Replacing or repairing a damaged device can take weeks or months, significantly limiting a person's mobility and participation in daily life. Some travelers have compared such damage to temporarily losing function or mobility.

== Airplane accessibility gaps ==
The U.S. Department of Transportation requires that aircraft with more than one aisle include an accessible lavatory; however, many such aircraft do not provide facilities that are fully accessible to all passengers. As a result, passengers who use wheelchairs may be unable to use the restroom during flights. Some disability advocates have noted that passengers may dehydrate themselves before flying to avoid needing to use inaccessible restrooms, potentially leading to health issues.

Additionally, passengers with limited mobility or balance may struggle to reach items stored in overhead compartments. While flight attendants may assist, some may lack training in supporting individuals with physical disabilities. For this reason, it is often recommended that passengers store essential items in a bag under the seat in front of them rather than in the overhead bin or at bulkhead seats, which often lack under-seat storage.

== Occupational therapy and advocacy ==
Occupational therapy is a healthcare discipline focused on enabling individuals to participate in everyday activities (occupations) that are meaningful to them, including travel. Occupational therapy practitioners (OTPs) are trained to assess barriers and recommend adaptations to improve access and participation.

According to the Bureau of Transportation Statistics, in 2018, approximately 25 wheelchairs or scooters were mishandled daily by U.S. airlines. These statistics highlight opportunities for improvement in handling mobility devices and overall accessibility in air travel. OTPs can play a key role in these efforts by consulting with airline and airport personnel on disability awareness, appropriate handling of assistive devices, safe transfer techniques, and environmental modifications. The American Occupational Therapy Association (AOTA) supports OTPs in advocating for more inclusive and dignified travel experiences for people with disabilities.

== Hidden Disabilities ==
=== DEAF ===
Deaf passengers may have difficulties hearing announcements or navigating and communicating with airport staff and cabin crew. They require extra accommodation in order to ensure they get the same level of service as other able-bodied passengers. In some countries such as those in the European Union, these are covered under a category called Persons with Reduced Mobility or PRM. Meet and assist services are provided for passengers with disabled hearing to get to their boarding gate safely.

=== BLND ===
Passengers with impaired vision will have extra difficulty navigating around the airport, especially if they are not fitted with extra features for blind people such as Braille and tactile paving, especially in congested areas such as car parks and drop-off points. Nevertheless, some European airports such as Warsaw Chopin Airport have features designed for visually impaired people, with voice messages, specialized convex lines and extra training for airport employees to better assist blind travellers.

=== DEAF/BLND ===
Passengers that are both deaf and blind require specialized assistance when travelling. They often experience difficulties due to the general lack of amenities and disabled-friendly infrastructure in airports. Airlines usually require a companion to guide them through boarding, onboarding and deplaning.

=== Others ===
Other hidden disabilities, such as chronic pain and severe allergies make travelling inconvenient. The airport environment also challenges passengers through spatial disorientation, communication difficulties, sensory stimulating environments, anxiety, and other factors. This may cause confusion or even distress to such individuals, and require personalized assistance in order to facilitate a more pleasant boarding and check-in experience.

== Mental Disabilities ==
=== DPNA ===
Passengers who have neurodevelopmental disorders such as ADHD, autism spectrum disorder (ASD) and intellectual disability may require wheelchair assistance, depending on the severity and degree of how well one can function in crowded environments such as the airport. Caregivers travelling with such passengers may choose to utilize wheelchairs at their discretion. In recent years, campaigns by travel agencies have raised awareness of the code, leading to better assistance for neurodivergent and mentally handicapped passengers.

== Regulations by region ==
=== Europe ===
According to EU regulation 1107/2006, persons with reduced mobility have the right to assistance during airline travel. The assistance is mandated for flights on any airline departing from an airport in the EU or flights to an airport in the EU on an aircraft registered in any EU country. The EU has specific regulations regarding airline passengers with reduced mobility. No passenger may be turned away due to their disability, except for reasons based on safety, and each passenger is entitled to two personal-assistance devices, including a wheelchair. Assistance should be provided to these passengers, either through the airport or a third party hired by the airport, and the EU provides guidance in training airport employees in assisting these passengers. Passengers have to also notify the airline 48 hours in advance to make sure appropriate assistance is given. The EU recommends that the extra cost of these services be covered by every airline at the airport proportionate to the number of passengers each one carries. Passengers should be compensated for damaged items such as wheelchairs and assistive devices "in accordance with rules of international, Community and national law". The Montreal Convention however, restricts compensation to 1,131 SDRs (around $1,500), significantly less than the value of many wheelchairs.

In the European Union, persons with disabilities are considered Persons with Reduced Mobility (PRM) under Regulation 1107/2006 of the European Parliament, and are entitled to assistance at airports across member states.

=== Americas ===
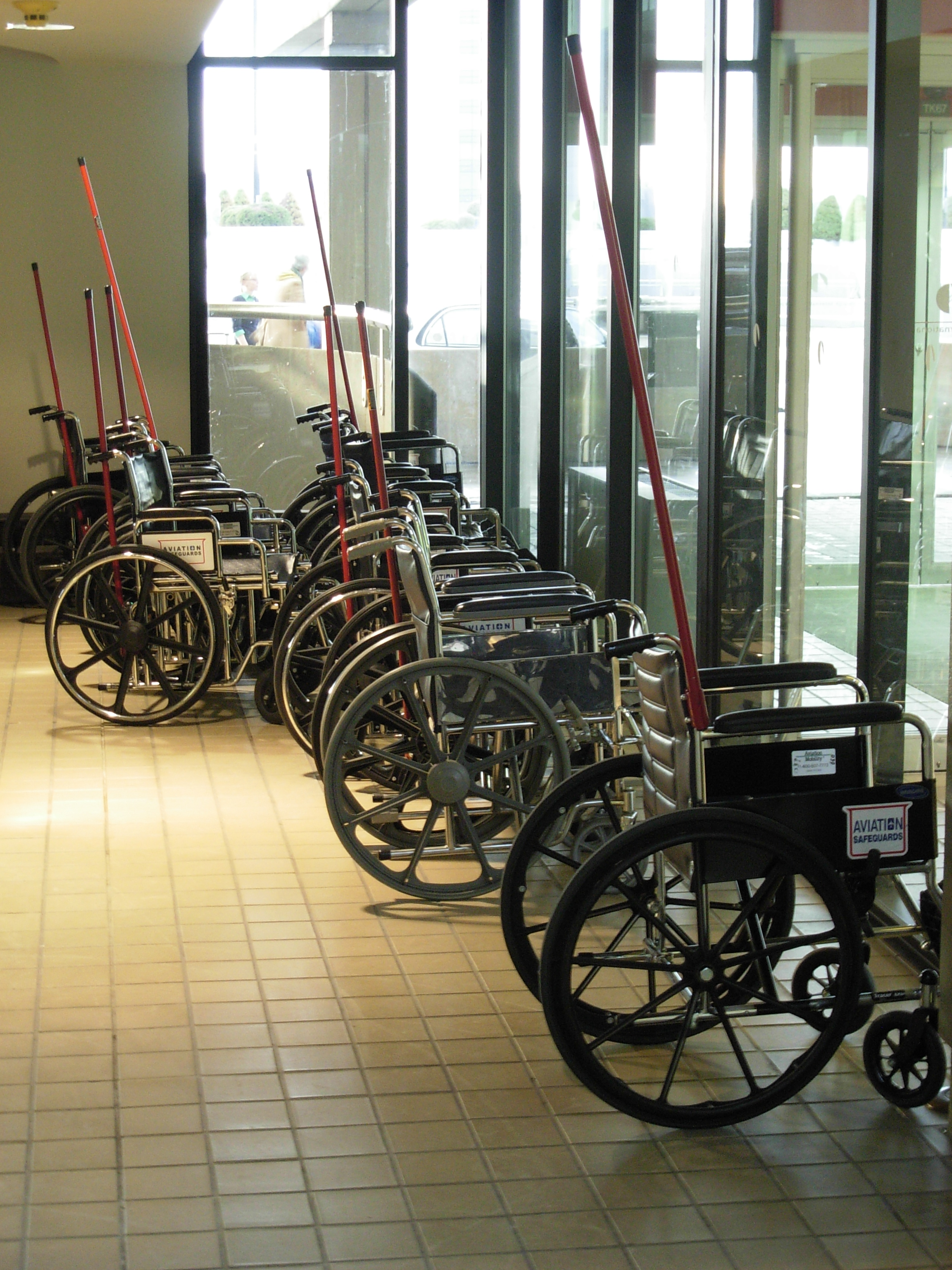
Wheelchairs for airline passengers at Pittsburgh International Airport.

The Air Carrier Access Act of 1986 prohibits commercial airlines from discriminating against passengers with disabilities. The act was passed by the U.S. Congress in direct response to a narrow interpretation of Section 504 of the Rehabilitation Act of 1973 by the U.S. Supreme Court in U.S. Department of Transportation (DOT) v. Paralyzed Veterans of America (PVA) (1986). In this case, the Supreme Court held that private, commercial air carriers are not liable under Section 504 because they are not "direct recipients" of federal funding to airports.

Airlines are required to provide passengers with disabilities any assistance they may need in order to travel properly like all other passengers. This includes allowing them with a wheelchair or other guided assistance to board, helping them disembark from a plane upon landing, or connecting these individuals to another flight. Individuals with disabilities are also required to seating accommodation assistance meets their disability-related needs. Certain types of wheelchairs can be checked in, such as collapsible wheelchairs, scooters and battery-powered wheelchairs that can be operated by the user themselves. If the wheelchair does not meet size requirements for check-in luggage, flight attendants will carry the wheelchair to the cargo hold free of charge.

The U.S. Department of Transportation currently does not include emotional support animals in the Air Carrier Access Act (ACAA), the act that allows service animals to fly on airplanes if they meet requirements. Before December 2020, they did include emotional support animals in their definition of service animals (US Department of Transportation, 2020).

In 2022, it was announced that the U.S. Department of Transportation (DOT) had published the Airline Passengers with Disabilities Bill of Rights. It (as stated by the DOT) "describes the fundamental rights of air travelers with disabilities under the Air Carrier Access Act and its implementing regulation, 14 Code of Federal Regulations (CFR) Part 382."

There are no significant guidelines for providing disability-friendly services at airports in South America. Regardless, certain airlines such as LATAM have aisle chairs on board to assist with boarding.

=== Oceania ===
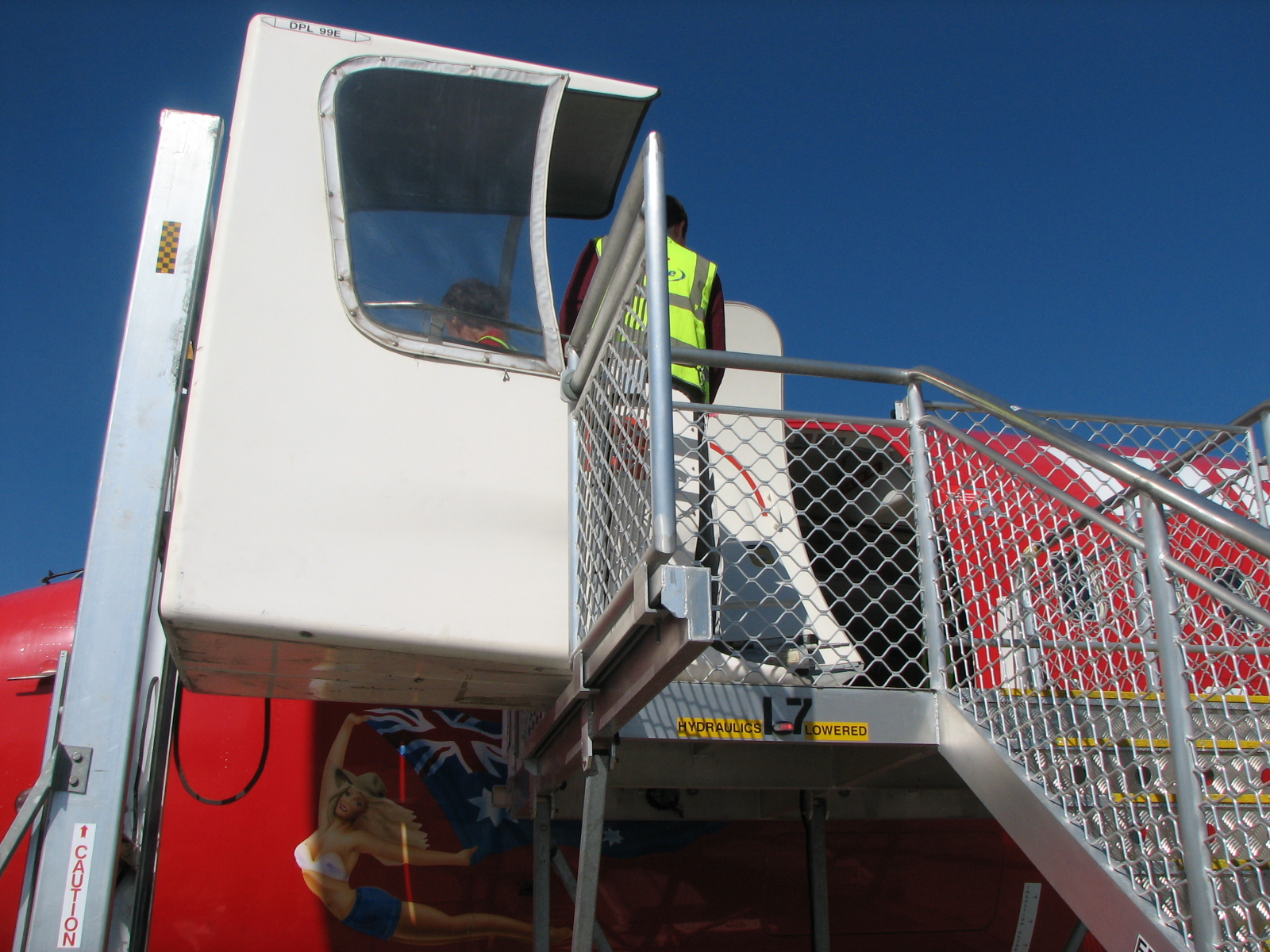
An external boarding lift used to transport passengers into aircraft cabins.

In Australia, public legislation requires airports to follow the guidelines of the National Construction Code and the Disability Standards for Accessible Public Transport. Wheelchair services are generally available on request at Australian airports and are provided within terminal buildings, car parks along with pick-up and drop-off zones. Some airports, such as Sydney Airport also allow assistance animals for passengers inside their terminals along with ATMs that have braille functionality for vision impaired passengers. All major Australian state and territory capitals have disability-friendly services as mandated by law according to the Disability Discrimination Act 1992, which prohibits airports from denying people with disabilities accommodations that cater to their needs. Qantas, the national carrier of Australia, also allows passengers to travel with several types of service dogs in the aircraft cabin, such as guide dogs for visually-impaired passengers and hearing dogs for hearing-impaired passengers.

Australian and New Zealand airports also utilize external boarding lifts in order to assist passengers directly through the cabin door without the space constraints of a jetbridge.

=== Asia ===
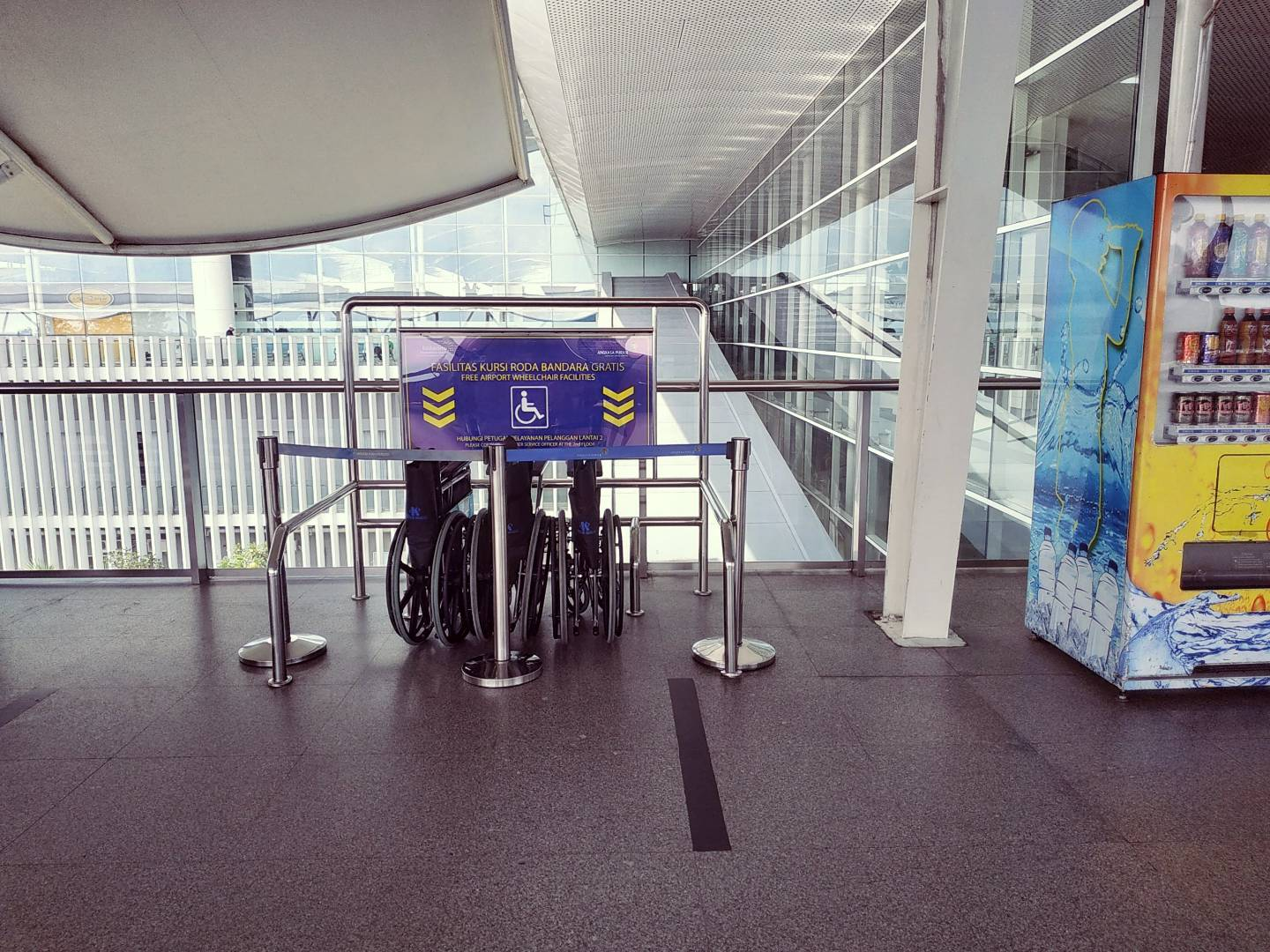
Wheelchair facilities next to a vending machine at Kualanamu International Airport, Medan, Indonesia.

Wheelchair services in Asia vary widely by region, airport and airline operator. Most major flag carriers such as Singapore Airlines and Cathay Pacific provide on-demand free wheelchair assistance, while low-cost carriers such as Jetstar Asia and Scoot provide weight and size restrictions on certain wheelchairs. Passengers flying on certain airlines, such as Jetstar Asia will have to pay additional fees. Wheelchair assistance at remote gates at selected airports are also available. Those with visual impairments are supposed to have meet and assist services provided by the airline if a caregiver or significant other is not present. There have been concerns about the standard of wheelchairs provided in some airports along with needs for upgrades in order to cater to disabled passengers.

== Training practices ==
Affirmer Australia: ‘Manual handling training enhanced by animations and video’ – discusses modern, engaging training methods that can help airline personnel better support passengers with mobility impairments.”

== Gallery ==
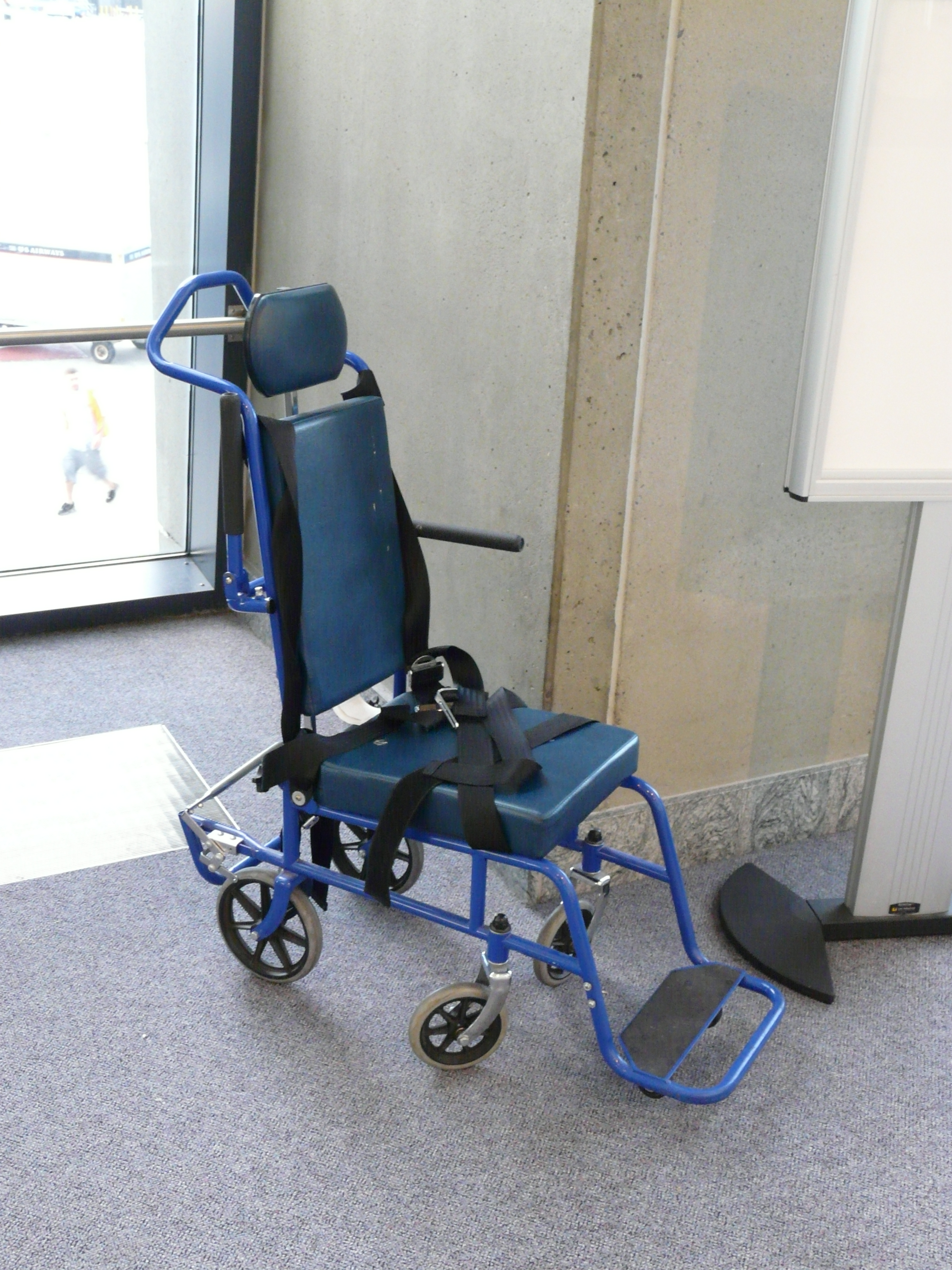
Wheelchair at Boston Airport, United States

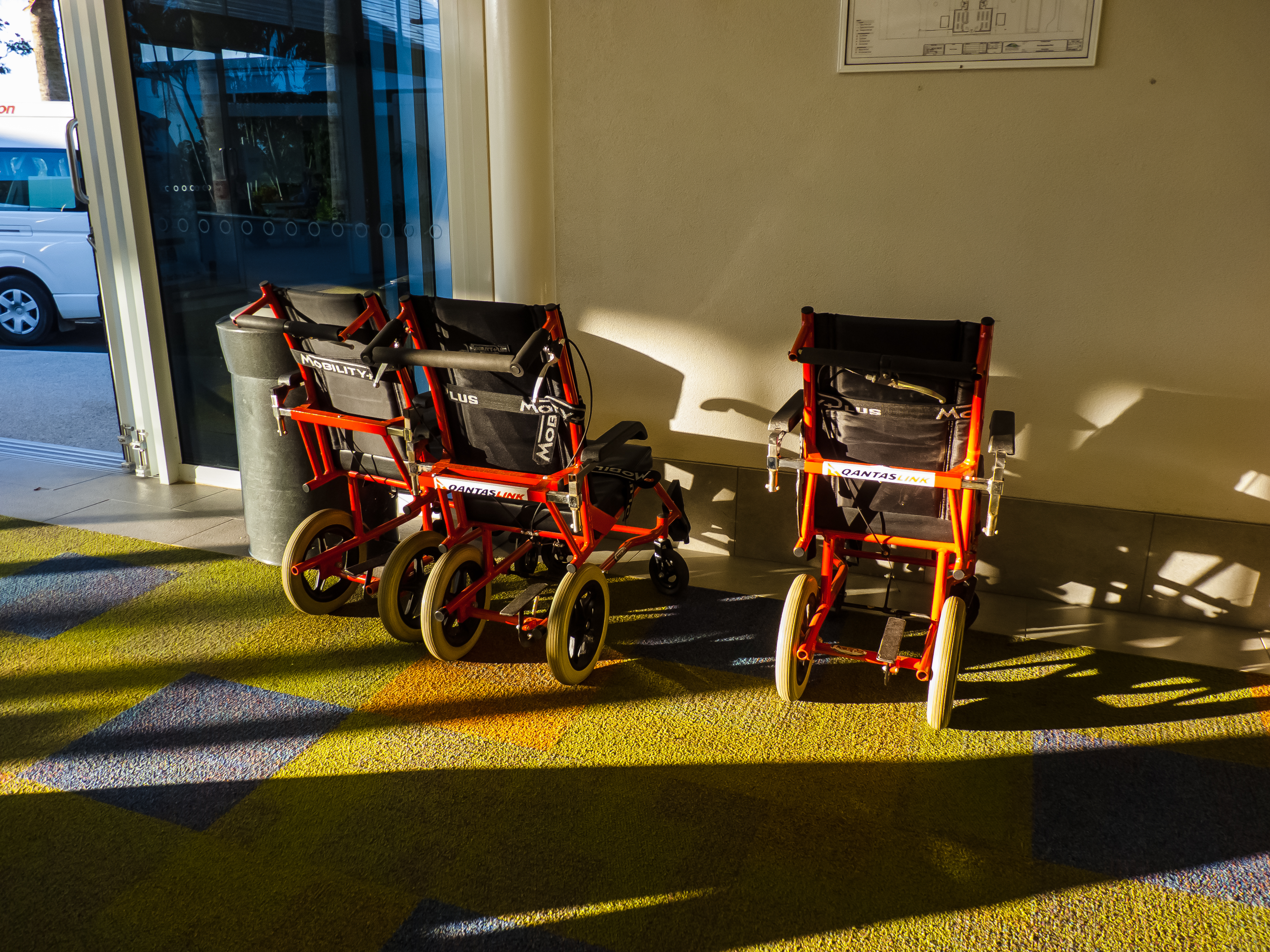
A set of wheelchairs in Bundaberg Airport, Queensland

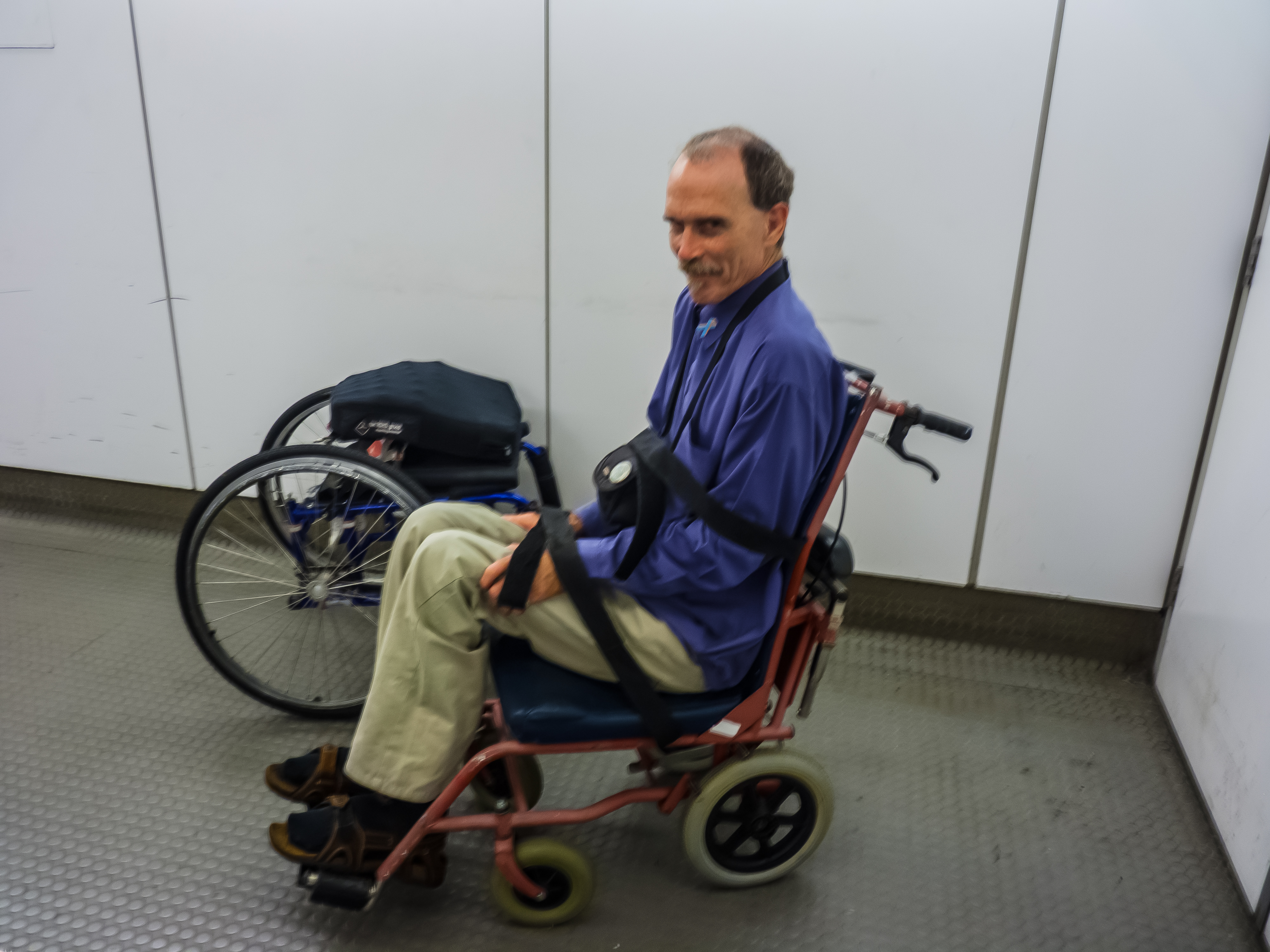
An aisle chair being used to transport a man into an aircraft at Brisbane Airport

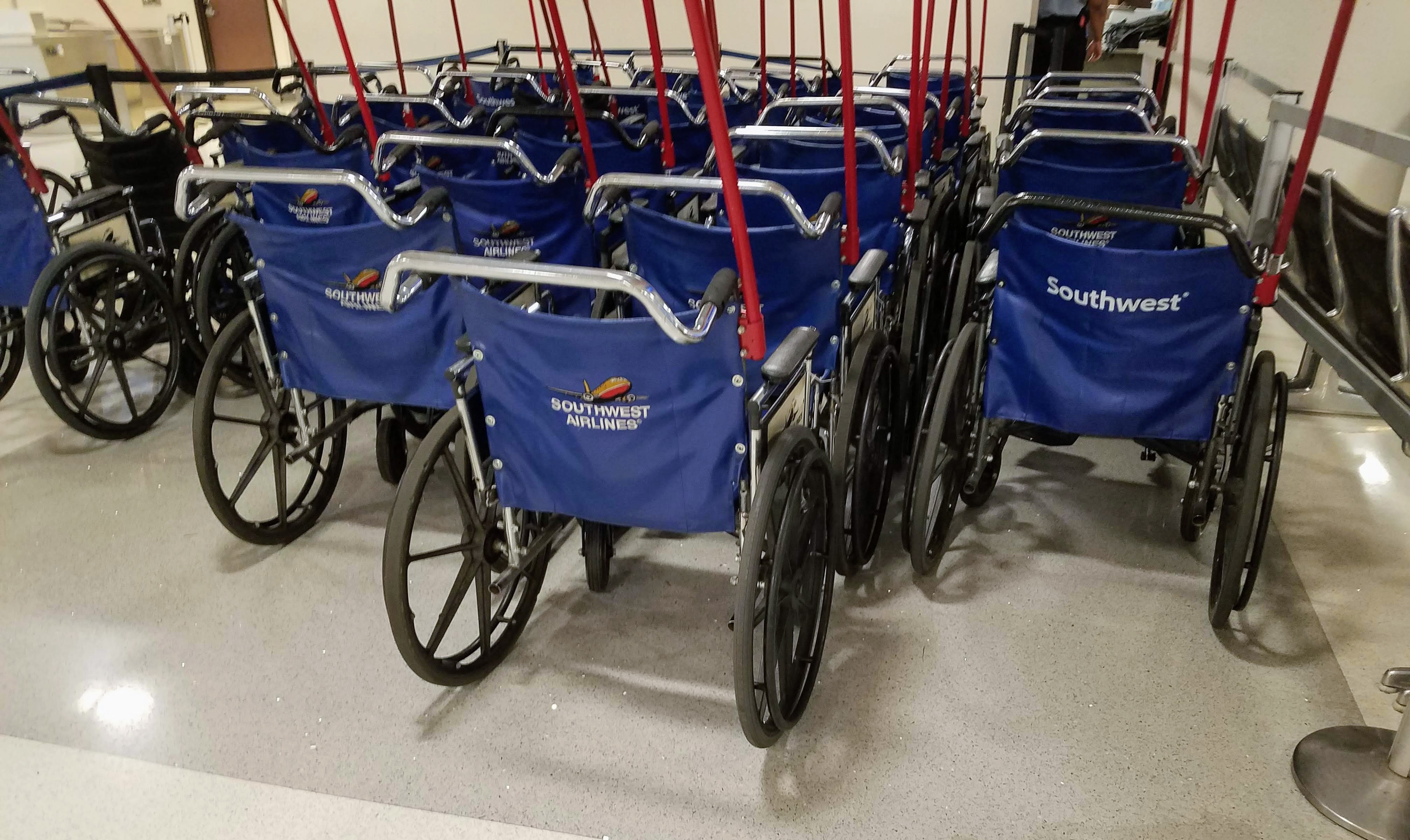
Southwest Airlines wheelchairs in storage at Phoenix Sky Harbor International

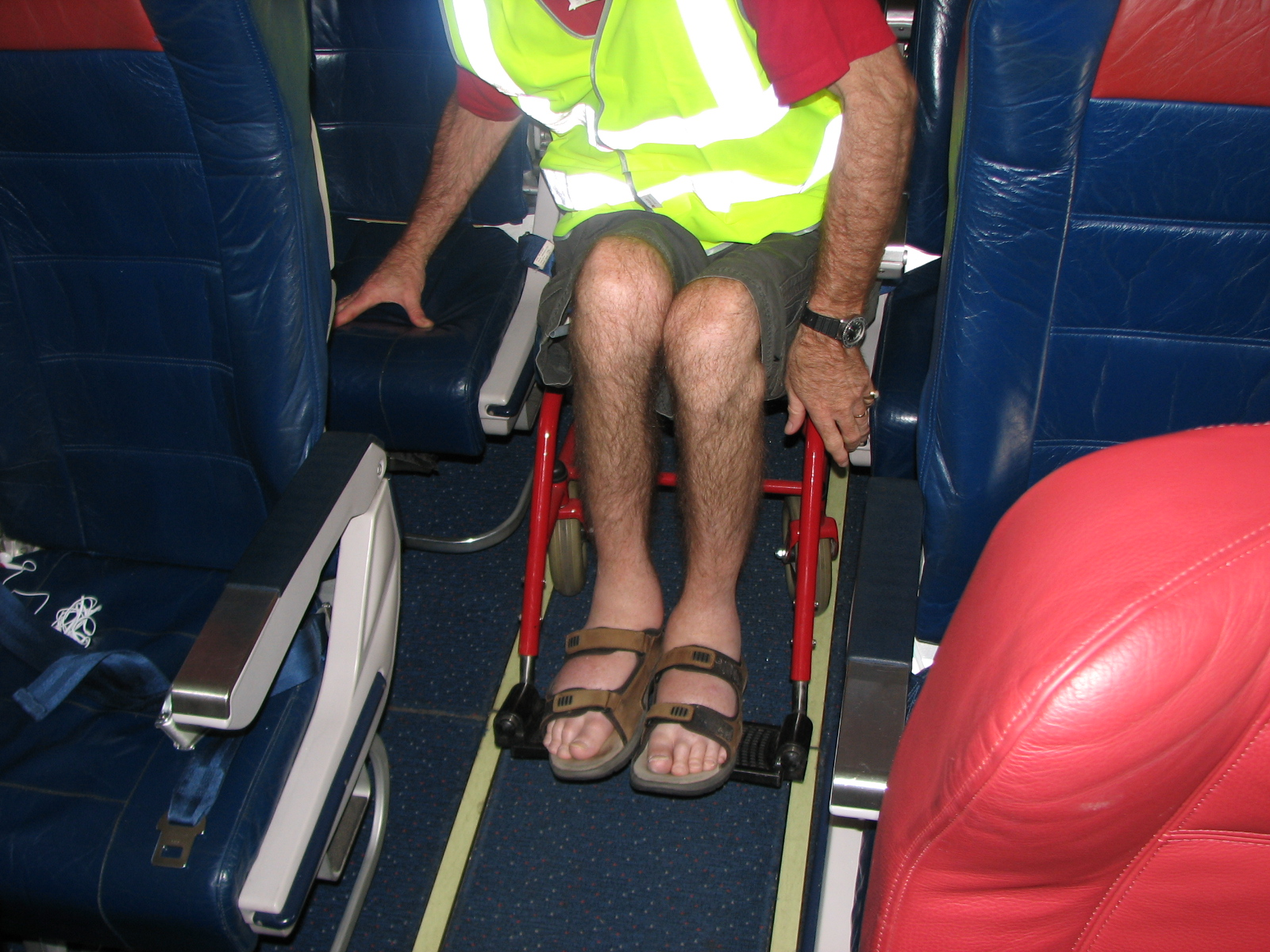
An aircraft aisle chair inside a Virgin Australia cabin

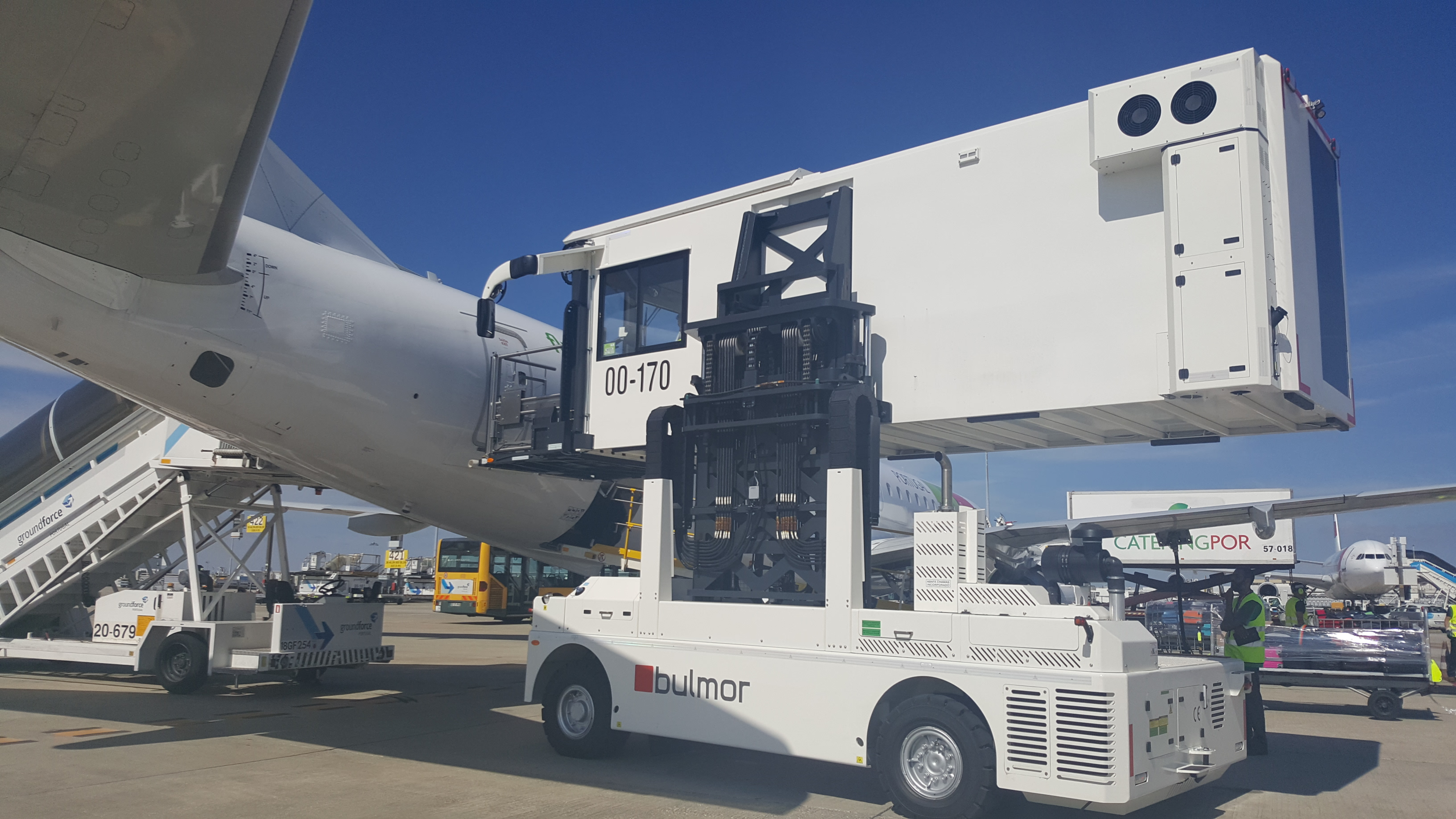
Boarding lift used to board wheelchair and disabled passengers

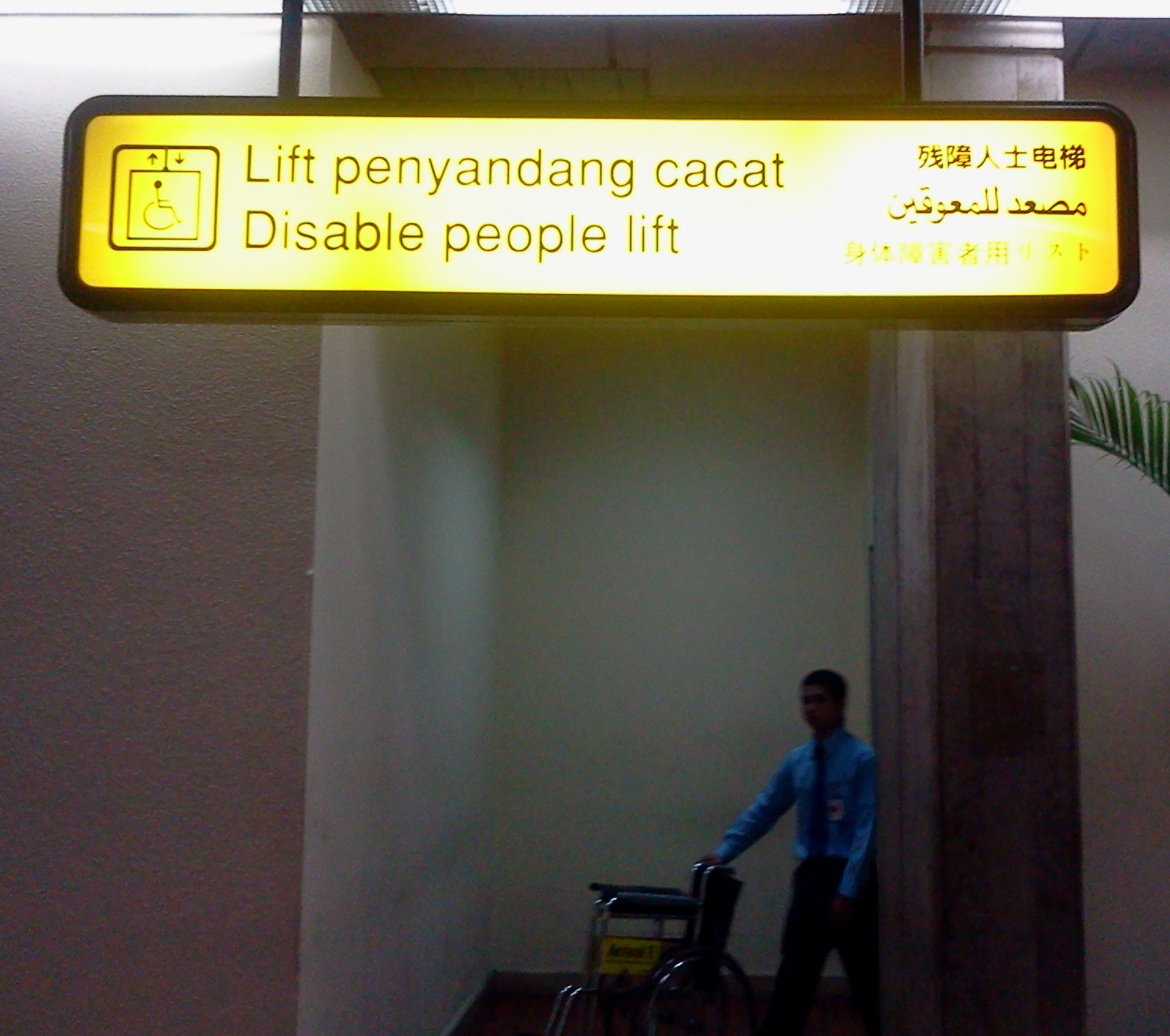
A lift for disabled passengers at Soekarno-Hatta International Airport, Jakarta, Indonesia

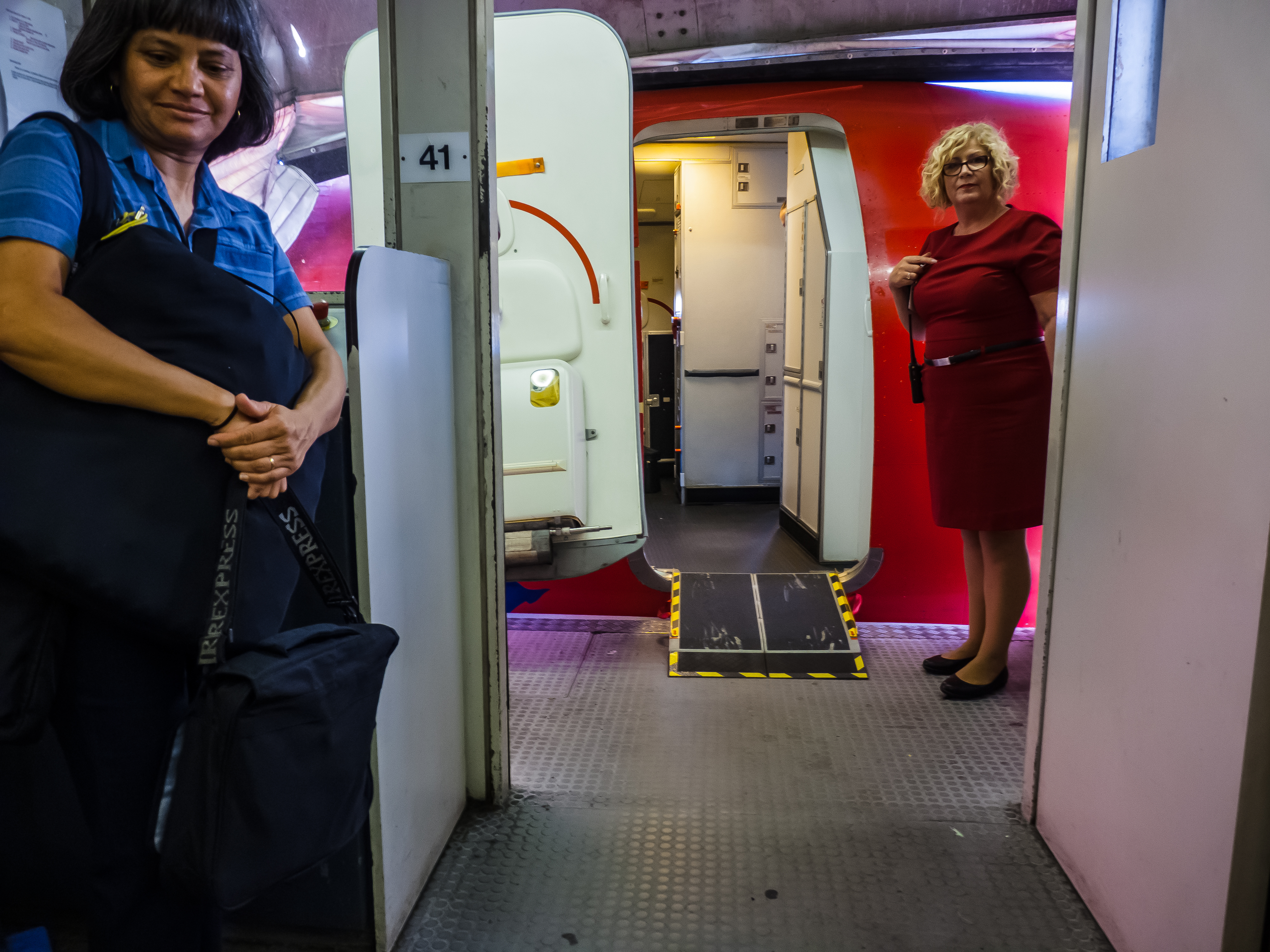
A boarding ramp used to help passengers with mobility issues get onto aircraft, as seen on this Virgin Australia Boeing 737. Flight attendants may assist if required.
