= Egg Harbor School District =

Egg Harbor School District may refer to:

- Egg Harbor City School District
- Egg Harbor Township Schools
