= Estell Manor School District =

School district in Atlantic County, New Jersey, US

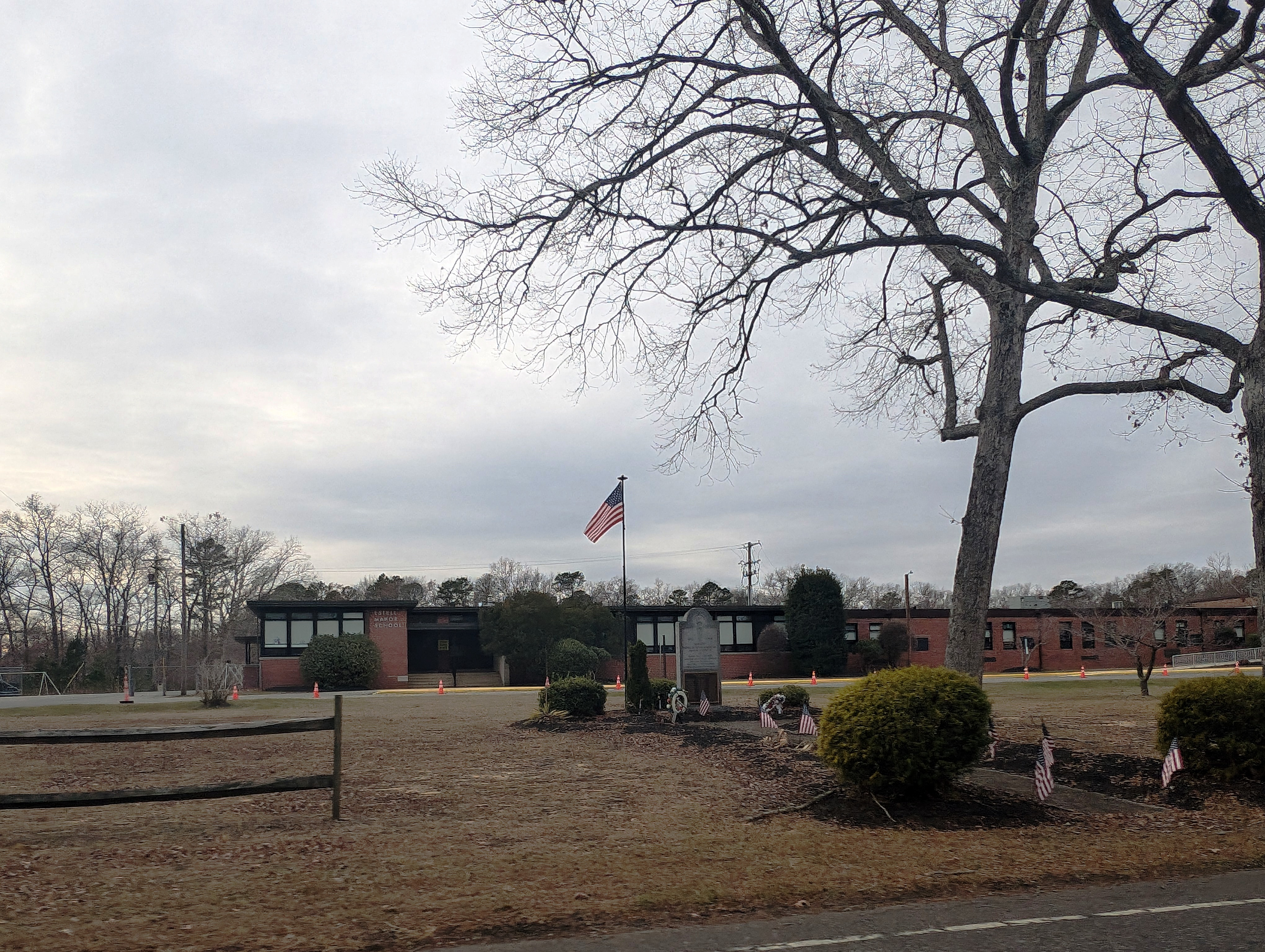
- Estell Manor School, the only school in the district

Address
- 128 Cape May Avenue Estell Manor, Atlantic County, New Jersey, 08319; United States
- Coordinates: 39.379093°N 74.825387°W

District information
- Grades: K-8
- Superintendent: David Ricci
- Business administrator: Rose Millar
- Schools: 1

Students and staff
- Enrollment: 180 (as of 2022–23)
- Faculty: 15.8 FTEs
- Student–teacher ratio: 11.4:1

Other information
- District Factor Group: DE
- Website: estellmanorschool.com
Ind.	Per pupil	District spending	Rank (*)	K-8 average	%± vs. average
1A	Total Spending	$17,741	29	$18,891	−6.1%
1	Budgetary Cost	14,452	27	14,159	2.1%
2	Classroom Instruction	7,658	13	8,659	−11.6%
6	Support Services	2,696	47	2,167	24.4%
8	Administrative Cost	1,732	43	1,547	12.0%
10	Operations & Maintenance	2,198	51	1,612	36.4%
13	Extracurricular Activities	100	24	104	−3.8%
16	Median Teacher Salary	57,697	35	61,136
Data from NJDoE 2014 Taxpayers' Guide to Education Spending. *Of K-8 districts with up to 400 students. Lowest spending=1; Highest=71

Estell Manor School District is a community public school district in Estell Manor, in Atlantic County, in the U.S. state of New Jersey, serving students in kindergarten through eighth grade.

As of the 2022–23 school year, the district, comprised of one school, had an enrollment of 180 students and 15.8 classroom teachers (on an FTE basis), for a student–teacher ratio of 11.4:1.

The district participates in the Interdistrict Public School Choice Program, which allows non-resident students to attend school in the district at no cost to their parents, with tuition covered by the resident district. Available slots are announced annually by grade.

For ninth through twelfth grades, public school students attend Buena Regional High School, which serves students from Buena Borough and Buena Vista Township, together with students from Estell Manor City and Weymouth Township who attend the school as part of sending/receiving relationships with the Buena Regional School District. As of the 2021–22 school year, the high school had an enrollment of 498 students and 48.0 classroom teachers (on an FTE basis), for a student–teacher ratio of 10.4:1.

City public school students are also eligible to attend the Atlantic County Institute of Technology in the Mays Landing section of Hamilton Township or the Charter-Tech High School for the Performing Arts, located in Somers Point.

== History ==
In 2013–2016, under Superintendent Noëlle Jacquelin, the district had no tax increase for three consecutive years. Voters passed a multimillion-dollar building project referendum, and the district was awarded an $800,000 grant from the New Jersey Schools Development Authority to cover project costs.

In the 2016–17 school year, Estell Manor was the 36th-smallest enrollment of any school district in the state, with 172 students.

The district had been classified by the New Jersey Department of Education as being in District Factor Group "DE", the fifth highest of eight groupings. District Factor Groups organize districts statewide to allow comparison by common socioeconomic characteristics of the local districts. From lowest socioeconomic status to highest, the categories are A, B, CD, DE, FG, GH, I and J.

== Awards and recognition ==
Estell Manor School was named as a "Star School" by the New Jersey Department of Education, the highest honor that a New Jersey school can achieve, in the 1994–95 school year

The district received "High Achieving" district status during the New Jersey Department of Education's QSAC evaluation.

== School ==
- Estell Manor Elementary School had an enrollment of 180 students as of the 2021–22 school year.

== Administration ==
Core members of the district's administration are:

- David Ricci, superintendent
- Rose Millar, business administrator and board secretary

== Board of education ==
The district's board of education, comprised of five members, sets policy and oversees the fiscal and educational operation of the district through its administration. As a Type II school district, the board's trustees are elected directly by voters to serve three-year terms of office on a staggered basis, with either one or two seats up for election each year held (since 2012) as part of the November general election. The board appoints a superintendent to oversee the district's day-to-day operations and a business administrator to supervise the business functions of the district.
