= Dorothy, New Jersey =

School district in Atlantic County, New Jersey, US

- Census-designated place
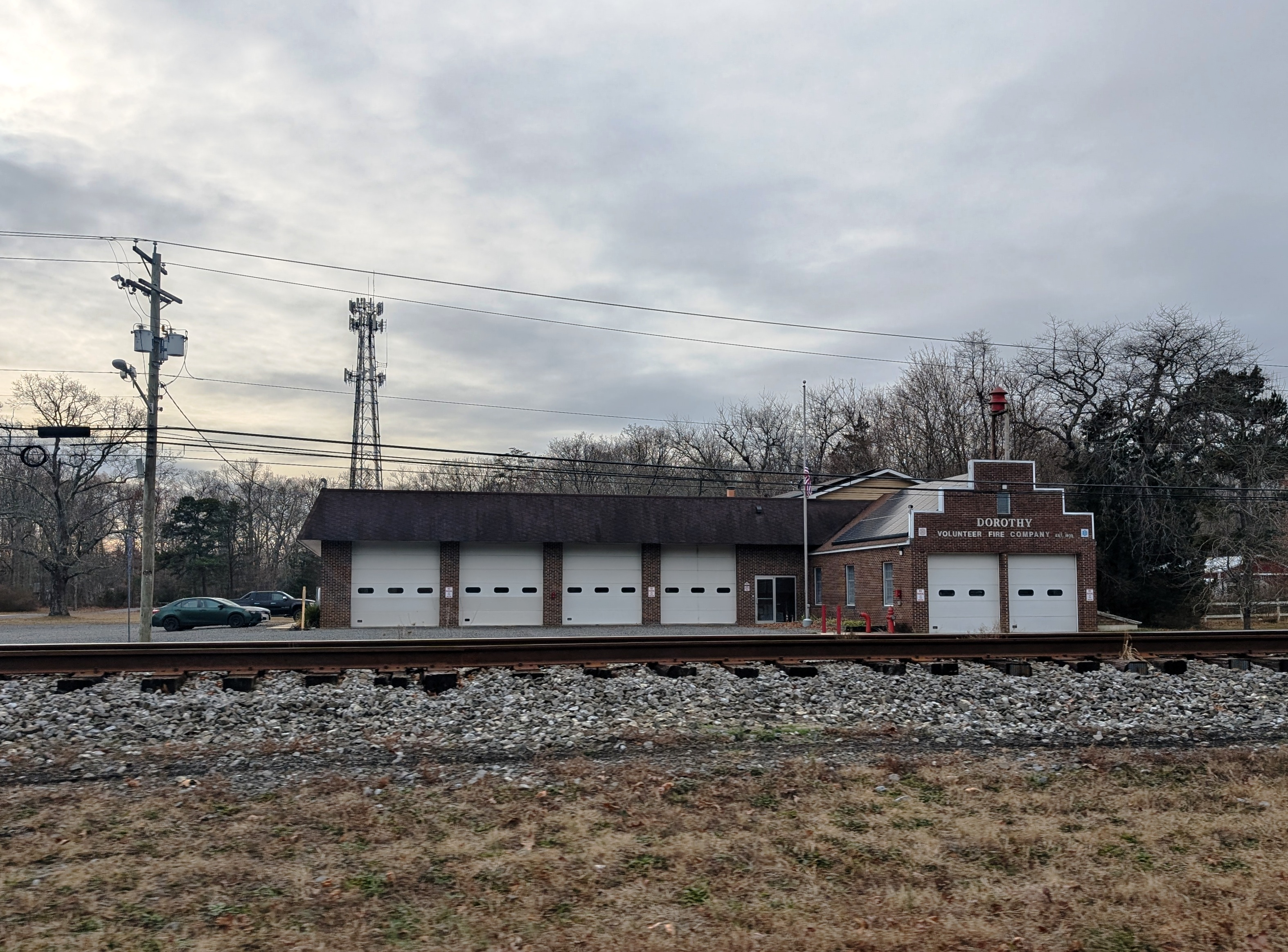
- Dorothy Volunteer Fire Company

- Location within Atlantic County. Inset: Location of Atlantic County within New Jersey. Dorothy (New Jersey) Dorothy (the United States)
- Coordinates: 39°24′02″N 74°49′26″W
- Country: United States
- State: New Jersey
- County: Atlantic
- Township: Weymouth

Area
  - Total: 5.84 sq mi (15.13 km^{2})
  - Land: 5.84 sq mi (15.13 km^{2})
  - Water: 0 sq mi (0.00 km^{2})
- Elevation: 72 ft (22 m)

Population (2020)
  - Total: 1,057
  - Density: 181.0/sq mi (69.87/km^{2})
- ZIP Code: 08317
- FIPS code: 34-18040
- GNIS feature ID: 0875947

Dorothy is an unincorporated community and census-designated place located in Weymouth Township in Atlantic County, in the U.S. state of New Jersey. The area is served as United States Postal Service ZIP Code 08317. As of the 2020 census, Dorothy had a population of 1,057.

== Demographics ==
Historical population
Census	Pop.	Note	%±
2020	1,057		—
U.S. Decennial Census

Dorothy first appeared as a census designated place in the 2020 U.S. census.

Dorothy CDP, New Jersey – Racial and ethnic composition Note: the US Census treats Hispanic/Latino as an ethnic category. This table excludes Latinos from the racial categories and assigns them to a separate category. Hispanics/Latinos may be of any race.
Race / Ethnicity (NH = Non-Hispanic)	Pop 2020	2020
White alone (NH)	916	86.66%
Black or African American alone (NH)	10	0.95%
Native American or Alaska Native alone (NH)	0	0.00%
Asian alone (NH)	13	1.23%
Native Hawaiian or Pacific Islander alone (NH)	0	0.00%
Other race alone (NH)	6	0.57%
Mixed race or Multiracial (NH)	36	3.41%
Hispanic or Latino (any race)	76	7.19%
Total	1,057	100.00%

As of 2020, the population of the area was 1,057.

== Education ==
The CDP is in the Weymouth Township School District.

== Notable people ==
People who were born in, residents of, or otherwise closely associated with Dorothy include:

- Frances Edelstein (1926–2018), businesswoman who ran the Cafe Edison in New York City's Theater District, together with her husband
- Harry Edelstein (1917–2009), Holocaust survivor and restaurateur known for running what was called the Polish Tea House
- Kathleen Karr (1946–2017), young adult and children's novelist
- Rhoda Scott (born 1938), soul jazz organist and singer
