= Ventnor City School District =

School district in Atlantic County, New Jersey, US

Address
- 400 North Lafayette Avenue Ventnor City, Atlantic County, New Jersey, 08406; United States
- Coordinates: 39.341884°N 74.481932°W

District information
- Grades: PreK-8
- Superintendent: Carmela Somershoe
- Business administrator: Beth Steinen
- Schools: 2

Students and staff
- Enrollment: 495 (as of 2023–24)
- Faculty: 71.0 FTEs
- Student–teacher ratio: 7.0:1

Other information
- District Factor Group: B
- Website: www.veccnj.org
Ind.	Per pupil	District spending	Rank (*)	K-8 average	%± vs. average
1A	Total Spending	$20,058	76	$18,891	6.2%
1	Budgetary Cost	14,182	42	14,159	0.2%
2	Classroom Instruction	9,227	64	8,659	6.6%
6	Support Services	1,919	31	2,167	−11.4%
8	Administrative Cost	1,530	38	1,547	−1.1%
10	Operations & Maintenance	1,422	31	1,612	−11.8%
13	Extracurricular Activities	84	36	104	−19.2%
16	Median Teacher Salary	79,165	82	61,136
Data from NJDoE 2014 Taxpayers' Guide to Education Spending. *Of K-8 districts with more than 750 students. Lowest spending=1; Highest=84

Ventnor City School District is a community public school district that serves students in pre-kindergarten through eighth grade from Ventnor City, in Atlantic County, in the U.S. state of New Jersey.

As of the 2023–24 school year, the district, comprised of two schools, had an enrollment of 495 students and 71.0 classroom teachers (on an FTE basis), for a student–teacher ratio of 7.0:1.

Public school students in ninth through twelfth grades, along with those from Brigantine and Margate City, attend Atlantic City High School in neighboring Atlantic City, as part of a sending/receiving relationship with the Atlantic City School District that has existed since 1920. As of the 2023–24 school year, the high school had an enrollment of 1,699 students and 144.8 classroom teachers (on an FTE basis), for a student–teacher ratio of 11.7:1.

== History ==
Until the 1970s, the district operated three school facilities, with a total enrollment in excess of a thousand students. In the face of declining enrollment, those three schools were demolished or repurposed. Lafayette School was constructed in 1970 and an adjoining middle school was constructed in 1983 on a single 10-acre (4.0 ha) plot of publicly owned property. For the 1995–96 school year, the two facilities — the PreK–4 Lafayette School and Ventnor Middle School for grades 5–8 — were consolidated to become the Ventnor Educational Community Complex. The district had a total of 905 students in 2013, which had dropped to just over 500 by 2022, while the number of students sent to Atlantic City High School over that same period had dropped from 286 to 128.

The Ventnor district has considered options for an alternative high school sending relationship other than Atlantic City High School.

The district had been classified by the New Jersey Department of Education as being in District Factor Group "B", the second lowest of eight groupings. District Factor Groups organize districts statewide to allow comparison by common socioeconomic characteristics of the local districts. From lowest socioeconomic status to highest, the categories are A, B, CD, DE, FG, GH, I and J.

== Schools ==
The Ventnor City School District operates two schools for PreK-8 within the Ventnor Educational Community Complex. Schools in the district (with 2023–24 enrollment data from the National Center for Education Statistics) are:

- Ventnor Elementary School with 302 students in grades PreK–5
  - Carmela Somershoe, principal
- Ventnor Middle School with 177 students in grades 6–8
  - Anthony Lupo, principal

The original school was built in 1970, with renovations in 1974, 1997 and 2001.

== Administration ==
Core members of the district's administration include:

- Carmela Somershoe, superintendent
- Beth Steinen, business administrator and board secretary

== Board of education ==
The district's board of education is comprised of seven members who set policy and oversee the fiscal and educational operation of the district through its administration. As a Type I school district, the board's trustees are appointed by the mayor to serve three-year terms of office on a staggered basis, with either two or three members up for reappointment each year. Of the more than 680 school districts statewide, Ventnor City is one of approximately a dozen districts with appointed school districts. The board appoints a superintendent to oversee the district's day-to-day operations and a business administrator to supervise the business functions of the district.
