= Newtonville, New Jersey =

Populated place in Atlantic County, New Jersey, US

- Census-designated place
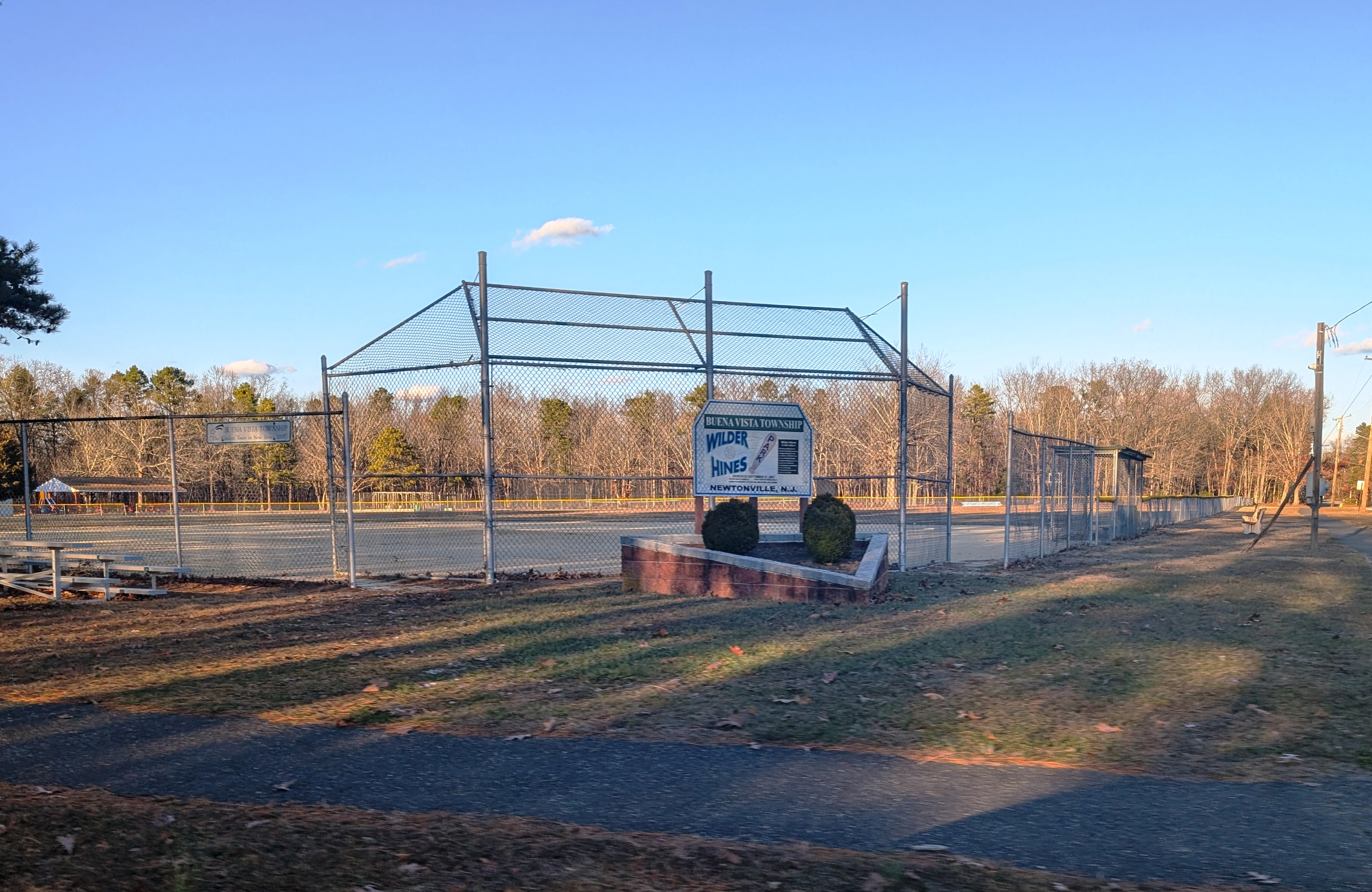
- Wilder Hines Park in Newtonville

- Location in Atlantic County Location in New Jersey Location in the United States
- Coordinates: 39°33′32″N 74°51′58″W
- Country: United States
- State: New Jersey
- County: Atlantic
- Township: Buena Vista

Area
  - Total: 3.16 sq mi (8.19 km^{2})
  - Land: 3.16 sq mi (8.19 km^{2})
  - Water: 0 sq mi (0.00 km^{2})
- Elevation: 102 ft (31 m)

Population (2020)
  - Total: 742
  - Density: 234.7/sq mi (90.61/km^{2})
- Time zone: UTC−05:00 (Eastern (EST))
  - Summer (DST): UTC−04:00 (EDT)
- ZIP Code: 08346
- Area codes: 609, 640
- FIPS code: 34-51990
- GNIS feature ID: 878795

Newtonville is an unincorporated community and census-designated place (CDP) in Buena Vista Township in Atlantic County, in the U.S. state of New Jersey. As of the 2020 census, Newtonville had a population of 742. Newtonville is located on a Conrail line 4.7 miles (7.6 km) east-northeast of Buena. Newtonville has a post office with ZIP Code 08346.

== Demographics ==
Newtonville was first listed as a census designated place in the 2020 U.S. census.

Historical population
Census	Pop.	Note	%±
2020	742		—
U.S. Decennial Census; 2020

Newtonville CDP, New Jersey – Racial and ethnic composition Note: the US Census treats Hispanic/Latino as an ethnic category. This table excludes Latinos from the racial categories and assigns them to a separate category. Hispanics/Latinos may be of any race.
Race / Ethnicity (NH = Non-Hispanic)	Pop 2020	2020
White alone (NH)	270	36.39%
Black or African American alone (NH)	294	39.62%
Native American or Alaska Native alone (NH)	1	0.13%
Asian alone (NH)	1	0.13%
Native Hawaiian or Pacific Islander alone (NH)	0	0.00%
Other race alone (NH)	0	0.00%
Mixed race or Multiracial (NH)	28	3.77%
Hispanic or Latino (any race)	148	19.95%
Total	742	100.00%

As of the 2020 United States census, the population was 742.

== Education ==
The CDP is in the Buena Regional School District.
