= Brigantine Public Schools =

School district in Atlantic County, New Jersey, US

Address
- 301 East Evans Boulevard Brigantine, Atlantic County, New Jersey, 08203; United States
- Coordinates: 39.410716°N 74.363978°W

District information
- Grades: PreK to 8
- Superintendent: Glenn Robbins
- Business administrator: Jonathan Houdart
- Schools: 1

Students and staff
- Enrollment: 386 (as of 2023–24)
- Faculty: 58.0 FTEs
- Student–teacher ratio: 6.7:1

Other information
- District Factor Group: CD
- Website: www.brigantineschools.org
Ind.	Per pupil	District spending	Rank (*)	K-8 average	%± vs. average
1A	Total Spending	$23,046	62	$18,891	22.0%
1	Budgetary Cost	18,220	61	14,159	28.7%
2	Classroom Instruction	11,274	61	8,659	30.2%
6	Support Services	2,606	50	2,167	20.3%
8	Administrative Cost	1,747	38	1,547	12.9%
10	Operations & Maintenance	2,348	61	1,612	45.7%
13	Extracurricular Activities	240	58	104	130.8%
16	Median Teacher Salary	83,687	62	61,136
Data from NJDoE 2014 Taxpayers' Guide to Education Spending. *Of K-8 districts with 401-750 students. Lowest spending=1; Highest=64

The Brigantine Public Schools is a community public school district that serves students in pre-kindergarten through eighth grade from Brigantine, in Atlantic County, in the U.S. state of New Jersey.

As of the 2023–24 school year, the district, comprised of one school, had an enrollment of 386 students and 58.0 classroom teachers (on an FTE basis), for a student–teacher ratio of 6.7:1.

The district had been classified by the New Jersey Department of Education as being in District Factor Group "CD", the sixth-highest of eight groupings. District Factor Groups organize districts statewide to allow comparison by common socioeconomic characteristics of the local districts. From lowest socioeconomic status to highest, the categories are A, B, CD, DE, FG, GH, I and J.

Students in public school for ninth through twelfth grades, along with those from Longport, Margate City and Ventnor City, attend Atlantic City High School in neighboring Atlantic City, as part of sending/receiving relationships with the Atlantic City School District. As of the 2023–24 school year, the high school had an enrollment of 1,699 students and 144.8 classroom teachers (on an FTE basis), for a student–teacher ratio of 11.7:1.

== History ==
In the face of declining district enrollment, which had been close to 800 in the 2010-11 school year, the district consolidated the two connected schools to have them operate as one starting in the 2019-20 school year.

== Awards and recognition ==
Brigantine Elementary School was recognized by Governor Jim McGreevey in 2003 as one of 25 schools selected statewide for the First Annual Governor's School of Excellence award.

== Schools ==
Schools in the district (with 2023–24 enrollment data from the National Center for Education Statistics) are:

- Brigantine Community School, with 383 students in grades PreK-8

== Administration ==
Core members of the district's administration are:

- Glenn Robbins, superintendent
- Jonathan Houdart, business administrator and board secretary

== Board of education ==
The district's board of education is comprised of seven members who set policy and oversee the fiscal and educational operation of the district through its administration. As a Type I school district, the board's trustees are appointed by the mayor to serve three-year terms of office on a staggered basis, with either two or three members up for reappointment each year. Of the more than 600 school districts statewide, Brigantine is one of 15 districts with appointed school districts. The board appoints a superintendent to oversee the district's day-to-day operations and a business administrator to supervise the business functions of the district. The district's budget is established by a Board of School Estimate, which includes the mayor, two councilmembers appointed by the mayor and two members selected by the board of education from among its members.
