= Weymouth Township School District =

School district in Atlantic County, New Jersey, US

Address
- 1202 Eleventh Avenue Weymouth Township, Atlantic County, New Jersey, 08317; United States
- Coordinates: 39.404996°N 74.816084°W

District information
- Grades: PreK-8
- Superintendent: Al Lewis
- Business administrator: Dawn Leary
- Schools: 1

Students and staff
- Enrollment: 161 (as of 2022–23)
- Faculty: 16.7 FTEs
- Student–teacher ratio: 9.6:1

Other information
- District Factor Group: B
- Website: weymouthtownshipschool.org
Ind.	Per pupil	District spending	Rank (*)	K-8 average	%± vs. average
1A	Total Spending	$17,718	28	$18,891	−6.2%
1	Budgetary Cost	14,515	28	14,159	2.5%
2	Classroom Instruction	8,993	31	8,659	3.9%
6	Support Services	1,905	21	2,167	−12.1%
8	Administrative Cost	1,812	51	1,547	17.1%
10	Operations & Maintenance	1,744	35	1,612	8.2%
13	Extracurricular Activities	47	18	104	−54.8%
16	Median Teacher Salary	52,878	12	61,136
Data from NJDoE 2014 Taxpayers' Guide to Education Spending. *Of K-8 districts with up to 400 students. Lowest spending=1; Highest=71

The Weymouth Township School District is a public school district that serves students in pre-kindergarten through eighth grade from Weymouth Township, in Atlantic County, in the U.S. state of New Jersey.

As of the 2022–23 school year, the district, comprised of one school, had an enrollment of 161 students and 16.7 classroom teachers (on an FTE basis), for a student–teacher ratio of 9.6:1. In the 2016–17 school year, Weymouth was tied with the 30th smallest enrollment of any school district in the state, with 155 students.

The district is classified by the New Jersey Department of Education as being in District Factor Group "B", the second-lowest of eight groupings. District Factor Groups organize districts statewide to allow comparison by common socioeconomic characteristics of the local districts. From lowest socioeconomic status to highest, the categories are A, B, CD, DE, FG, GH, I and J.

For ninth through twelfth grades, public school students attend Buena Regional High School as part of a sending/receiving relationship with the Buena Regional School District. Students attend the high school from Buena and Buena Vista Township, along with students from Estell Manor, who attend as part of a sending/receiving relationship. As of the 2022–23 school year, the high school had an enrollment of 496 students and 44.6 classroom teachers (on an FTE basis), for a student–teacher ratio of 11.1:1.

== School ==
Weymouth Township Elementary School had an enrollment of 156 students in grades PreK-8 in the 2022–23 school year.

== Administration ==
Core members of the district's administration are:

- Al Lewis, superintendent
- Dawn Leary, school business administrator and board secretary

== Board of education ==
The district's board of education, comprised of nine members, sets policy and oversees the fiscal and educational operation of the district through its administration. As a Type II school district, the board's trustees are elected directly by voters to serve three-year terms of office on a staggered basis, with three seats up for election each year held (since 2012) as part of the November general election. The board appoints a superintendent to oversee the district's day-to-day operations and a business administrator to supervise the business functions of the district.
