= Margate City Schools =

School district in Atlantic County, New Jersey, US

Address
- 8103 Winchester Avenue Margate City, Atlantic County, New Jersey, 08402; United States
- Coordinates: 39.331126°N 74.5021°W

District information
- Grades: K-8
- Superintendent: Ryan Gaskill
- Business administrator: Melina Skwarek
- Schools: 2

Students and staff
- Enrollment: 317 (as of 2023–24)
- Faculty: 48.6 FTEs
- Student–teacher ratio: 6.5:1

Other information
- District Factor Group: DE
- Website: www.margateschools.org
Ind.	Per pupil	District spending	Rank (*)	K-8 average	%± vs. average
1A	Total Spending	$26,060	64	$18,891	37.9%
1	Budgetary Cost	20,497	64	14,159	44.8%
2	Classroom Instruction	11,774	64	8,659	36.0%
6	Support Services	3,631	62	2,167	67.6%
8	Administrative Cost	1,841	52	1,547	19.0%
10	Operations & Maintenance	2,954	64	1,612	83.3%
13	Extracurricular Activities	135	35	104	29.8%
16	Median Teacher Salary	86,541	63	61,136
Data from NJDoE 2014 Taxpayers' Guide to Education Spending. *Of K-8 districts with 401-750 students. Lowest spending=1; Highest=64

The Margate City Schools are a community public school district that serves students in kindergarten through eighth grade from Margate City, in Atlantic County, in the U.S. state of New Jersey. Students from Longport Borough, a non-operating school district, jointly attend the district's schools.

As of the 2023–24 school year, the district, comprised of two schools, had an enrollment of 317 students and 48.6 classroom teachers (on an FTE basis), for a student–teacher ratio of 6.5:1.

The district had been classified by the New Jersey Department of Education as being in District Factor Group "DE", the fifth-highest of eight groupings. District Factor Groups organize districts statewide to allow comparison by common socioeconomic characteristics of the local districts. From lowest socioeconomic status to highest, the categories are A, B, CD, DE, FG, GH, I and J.

For ninth through twelfth grades, public school students from Margate attend Atlantic City High School in Atlantic City, which also serves students from Brigantine and Ventnor City who attend the school as part of sending/receiving relationships. As of the 2023–24 school year, the high school had an enrollment of 1,699 students and 144.8 classroom teachers (on an FTE basis), for a student–teacher ratio of 11.7:1.\

== Awards and recognition ==
Eugene A. Tighe Middle School was one of nine public schools recognized in 2017 as Blue Ribbon Schools by the United States Department of Education.

== Schools ==
Schools in the district (with 2023–24 enrollment data from the National Center for Education Statistics) are:

Elementary school

- William H. Ross III Elementary School 184 students in grades K–4
  - Bonnie Marino, principal

Middle school

- Eugene A. Tighe Middle School with 133 students in grades 5–8
  - Samantha Dulude, principal

== Administration ==
Core members of the district's administration are:

- Ryan Gaskill, superintendent of schools
- Melina Skwarek, board secretary and school business administrator

== Board of education ==
The district's board of education, comprised of seven members, sets policy and oversees the fiscal and educational operation of the district through its administration. As a Type I school district, the board's trustees are appointed by the mayor with either two or three seats up for reappointment each year. The board appoints a superintendent to oversee the district's day-to-day operations and a business administrator to supervise the business functions of the district.
