= Somers Point Public Schools =

School district in Atlantic County, New Jersey, US

Address
- 121 West New York Avenue Somers Point, Atlantic County, New Jersey, 08244; United States
- Coordinates: 39.315611°N 74.596452°W

District information
- Grades: K to 8
- Superintendent: Ted Pugliese
- Business administrator: Mark Leung
- Schools: 3

Students and staff
- Enrollment: 763 (as of 2023–24)
- Faculty: 78.0 FTEs
- Student–teacher ratio: 9.8:1

Other information
- District Factor Group: CD
- Website: www.sptsd.org
Ind.	Per pupil	District spending	Rank (*)	K-8 average	%± vs. average
1A	Total Spending	$15,801	18	$18,891	−16.4%
1	Budgetary Cost	13,032	27	14,159	−8.0%
2	Classroom Instruction	8,322	33	8,659	−3.9%
6	Support Services	1,823	22	2,167	−15.9%
8	Administrative Cost	1,312	16	1,547	−15.2%
10	Operations & Maintenance	1,331	23	1,612	−17.4%
13	Extracurricular Activities	138	74	104	32.7%
16	Median Teacher Salary	52,820	5	61,136
Data from NJDoE 2014 Taxpayers' Guide to Education Spending. *Of K-8 districts with more than 750 students. Lowest spending=1; Highest=84

The Somers Point Public Schools are a community public school district that serves students in kindergarten through eighth grade from Somers Point, in Atlantic County, in the U.S. state of New Jersey.

As of the 2023–24 school year, the district, comprised of three schools, had an enrollment of 763 students and 78.0 classroom teachers (on an FTE basis), for a student–teacher ratio of 9.8:1.

Students in public school for ninth through twelfth grades attend Mainland Regional High School, which also serves students from Linwood and Northfield. The high school is located in Linwood. For the 1997-98 school year, Mainland Regional High School was recognized by the United States Department of Education as a National Blue Ribbon School. As of the 2023–24 school year, the high school had an enrollment of 1,171 students and 106.2 classroom teachers (on an FTE basis), for a student–teacher ratio of 11.0:1.

The district's Education Foundation has funded technology programs, mini-grants and the annual Stokes Trip, investing approximately $250,000 to schools since it was established in 1995.

== History ==
Since the 2018–19 school year, after considering several alternative options, the district was reconfigured so that Jordan Road School will house grades forth to eighth grade and Dawes Avenue School will house kindergarten to third grade, while New York Avenue School will remain the same consisting of Pre-K and the administration offices.

The district had been classified by the New Jersey Department of Education as being in District Factor Group "CD", the sixth-highest of eight groupings. District Factor Groups organize districts statewide to allow comparison by common socioeconomic characteristics of the local districts. From lowest socioeconomic status to highest, the categories are A, B, CD, DE, FG, GH, I and J.

== Schools ==
The Somers Point School District consists of three school facilities: Jordan Road School, constructed in 1966 with an addition in 1991; Dawes Avenue School, constructed in 1998; and New York Avenue School, constructed in 1914 with an addition in 1922 and a refurbishing project in 2005, which houses preschool and the district's central offices. Schools in the district (with 2023–24 enrollment data from the National Center for Education Statistics) are:

Preschool

- New York Avenue School with 4 students in pre-kindergarten

Elementary schools

- Dawes Avenue School with 384 students in grades Kindergarten through 3rd grade
  - Melanie Wagner, principal
- Jordan Road Middle School with 366 students in 4th through 8th grade
  - Ken Berardis, principal

== Administration ==
Core members of the district's administration are:

- Ted Pugliese, superintendent of schools; effective July 1, 2024
- Mark Leung, business administrator and board secretary

== Board of education ==
The district's board of education, comprised of nine members, sets policy and oversees the fiscal and educational operation of the district through its administration. As a Type II school district, the board's trustees are elected directly by voters to serve three-year terms of office on a staggered basis, with three seats up for election each year held (since 2012) as part of the November general election. The board appoints a superintendent to oversee the district's day-to-day operations and a business administrator to supervise the business functions of the district.
