= Northfield Community Schools =

School district in Atlantic County, New Jersey, US

Address
- 2000 New Road Northfield, Atlantic County, New Jersey, 08225; United States
- Coordinates: 39.368229°N 74.560859°W

District information
- Grades: PreK-8
- Superintendent: Pete Bretones
- Business administrator: Linda Albright
- Schools: 2

Students and staff
- Enrollment: 947 (as of 2023–24)
- Faculty: 91.5 FTEs
- Student–teacher ratio: 10.4:1

Other information
- District Factor Group: DE
- Website: www.ncs-nj.org
Ind.	Per pupil	District spending	Rank (*)	K-8 average	%± vs. average
1A	Total Spending	$16,292	24	$18,891	−13.8%
1	Budgetary Cost	12,260	18	14,159	−13.4%
2	Classroom Instruction	8,381	36	8,659	−3.2%
6	Support Services	1,293	5	2,167	−40.3%
8	Administrative Cost	1,355	20	1,547	−12.4%
10	Operations & Maintenance	1,161	11	1,612	−28.0%
13	Extracurricular Activities	70	24	104	−32.7%
16	Median Teacher Salary	56,030	15	61,136
Data from NJDoE 2014 Taxpayers' Guide to Education Spending. *Of K-8 districts with more than 750 students. Lowest spending=1; Highest=84

The Northfield Community Schools is a community public school district that serves students in pre-kindergarten through eighth grade from the City of Northfield, in Atlantic County, in the U.S. state of New Jersey.

As of the 2023–24 school year, the district, comprised of two schools, had an enrollment of 947 students and 91.5 classroom teachers (on an FTE basis), for a student–teacher ratio of 10.4:1.

The district had been classified by the New Jersey Department of Education as being in District Factor Group "DE", the fifth-highest of eight groupings. District Factor Groups organize districts statewide to allow comparison by common socioeconomic characteristics of the local districts. From lowest socioeconomic status to highest, the categories are A, B, CD, DE, FG, GH, I and J.

Students in ninth through twelfth grades attend Mainland Regional High School, which serves students from Linwood, Northfield and Somers Point. The high school is located in Linwood. For the 1997-98 school year, Mainland Regional High School was recognized by the United States Department of Education as a National Blue Ribbon School. As of the 2023–24 school year, the high school had an enrollment of 1,171 students and 106.2 classroom teachers (on an FTE basis), for a student–teacher ratio of 11.0:1.

== Awards and recognition ==
SETDA, the State Educational Technology Directors Association, named the Middle School as the winner of its Student Voices Award, which honors "an outstanding K-12 school or district that has leveraged technology to dramatically improve the educational experiences and achievement of their students." Northfield was praised for "redesigning their school setting to invite innovative learning anywhere and anytime. Modeled from the d. School at Stanford University, the school implemented new furniture, whiteboards, bikes, turtles, and more ... Overall, this school has been transformed to a new digital learning environment that provides hands-on experiences for all learners."

In 2016, Principal Glenn Robbins was recognized by the National Association of Secondary School Principals as one of three top national Digital Principals for the innovative Design Thinking and Idea Street concepts in the Northfield Middle School.

Karen Schroeder, 7th grade math teacher at Northfield Community School, was named the 2009/2010 Atlantic County Teacher of the Year.

Northfield Community School was named one of eight New Jersey Schools of Character.

In 2008, Northfield Community School was named the Healthiest School in Atlantic County in AtlantiCare's Healthy Schools contest.

== Schools ==
Schools in the district (with 2023–24 enrollment data from the National Center for Education Statistics) are:

Elementary school

- Northfield Preschool, Primary, and Elementary School with 451 students in grades PreK–4
  - Maureen Vaccaro, principal

Middle school

- Northfield Community Middle School with 394 students in grades 5–8
  - Kevin Morrison, principal

== Administration ==
Core members of the district's administration are:

- Pedro D. Bretones, superintendent
- Jamie Shoemaker, business administrator / board secretary

== Board of education ==
The district's board of education, comprised of nine members, sets policy and oversees the fiscal and educational operation of the district through its administration. As a Type II school district, the board's trustees are elected directly by voters to serve three-year terms of office on a staggered basis, with three seats up for election each year held (since 2012) as part of the November general election. The board appoints a superintendent to oversee the district's day-to-day operations and a business administrator to supervise the business functions of the district.
