= Kathleen Karr =

American author (1946 – 2017)

- Born: Kathleen Csere; April 21, 1946; Allentown, Pennsylvania, U.S.
- Died: December 6, 2017 (aged 71); Chicago, Illinois, U.S.
- Writing career
- Genre: Historical novels
- Notable works: From This Day Forward, The Boxer, The Great Turkey Walk
- Notable awards: Golden Medallion – Inspirational Romance; 1986 From This Day Forward; Golden Kite Award (2000); Agatha Award (2003)

Kathleen Karr (née Csere; April 21, 1946 – December 6, 2017) was an American author of historical novels for children and young adults. She is the winner of the Golden Kite Award for her book, The Boxer.

== Early life and education ==
Karr was born April 21, 1946, in Allentown, Pennsylvania and grew up on a chicken farm in the Dorothy section of Weymouth Township, New Jersey She graduated from Catholic University of America in Washington, D.C. in 1968 and received a master's degree in English literature from Providence College in Providence, Rhode Island in 1971.

== Career ==
Karr worked at the newly formed American Film Institute in Washington, D.C. in 1971. After a year there, she worked for the Circle Theatre chain until her daughter was born. She wrote her first novel, Light of My Heart, in 1984. After her young children asked her to write a story for them, she published her first children's book, It Ain't Always Easy (1990), and began a full-time career writing for children and young adults.

In her novel The Great Turkey Walk, she depicts the movement of poultry from county to county where poultry was walked from Missouri to Denver, in much the same way it was done for centuries.

She is the author of Gilbert and Sullivan Set Me Free about a women's prison. Based on a historical event in 1914, the inmates of Sherborn Women's Prison in Sherborn, Massachusetts put on a performance of The Pirates of Penzance. In her novel, the prison's chaplain uses the transformative power of music and theater in helping reform inmates and in bringing them together in spirited community.

== Death ==
Karr died December 6, 2017, in Chicago, Illinois.

== Titles ==
- Fortune's Fool (2008)
- Born for Adventure (2007)
- Worlds Apart (2005)
- Mama Went to Jail for the Vote (2005) (with Bonnie Christensen and Malene Laugesen)
- Exiled: Memoirs of a Camel (2004)
- Gilbert & Sullivan Set Me Free (2003)
- The 7th Knot (2003)
- Dwight D. Eisenhower: Letters from a New Jersey Schoolgirl (2002)
- Bone Dry (2002)
- Playing With Fire (2001)
- The Boxer (2000)
- It Happened In the White House (2000)
- Skullduggery (2000)
- Man of the Family (1999)
- The Great Turkey Walk (1998)
- Oregon, Sweet Oregon (1998)
- Lighthouse Mermaid (1998)
- Gold Rush Phoebe (1998)
- Phoebe's Folly (1997)
- Spy in the Sky (1997)
- Go West, Young Women (1997)
- In The Kaiser's Clutch (1995)
- Oh, Those Harper Girls (1995)
- The Cave (1994)
- The Promised Land (1993)
- Gone West (1993)
- Gideon and the Mummy Professor (1993)
- It Ain't Always Easy (1990)
- Chessie's King (1986)
- From This Day Forward (1985)
- Light of my Heart (1984)

== Awards and reception ==
- 1986 - Romance Writers of America Golden Medallion, Inspirational Romance – From This Day Forward
