= Bonnie Christensen =

American author and illustrator

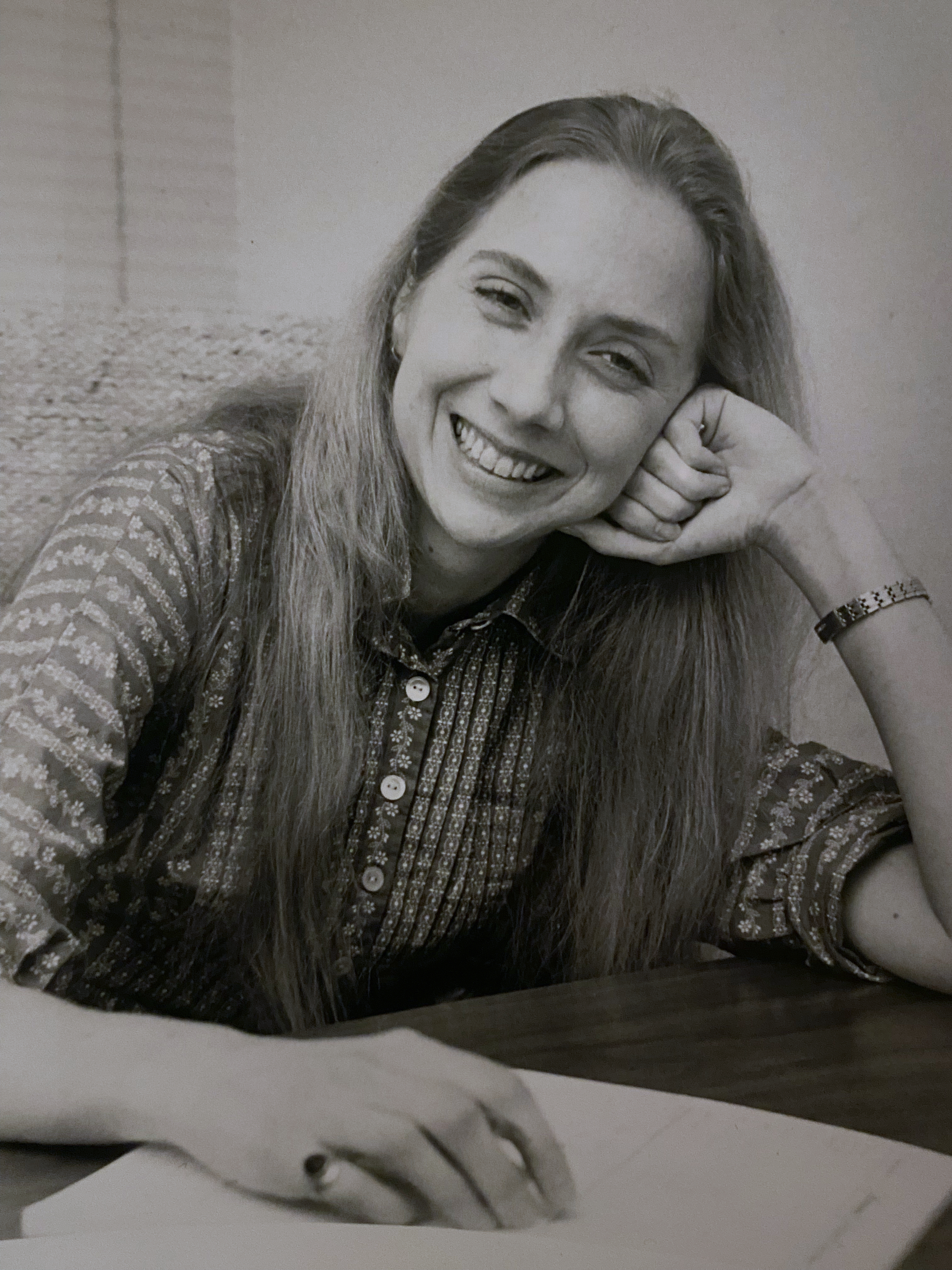

Bonnie Christensen (January 23, 1951 – January 12, 2015), an American author and illustrator, is best known for writing biographies and other illustrated non-fiction books for children and young adults. She was also an accomplished wood engraver and fine artist whose works were shown internationally in both solo and group exhibitions.

She taught fine arts at Saint Michael's College in Colchester, Vermont from 1996 - 2008 and writing at Vermont College of Fine Arts in the Writing for Children and Young Adults program from 2011 - 2015.

== Bibliography ==
=== As author ===
- Sunshine, Moonshine, by Bonnie Christensen and Emily Herder. Onion River Press, March 2024.

=== As author and illustrator ===
- Elvis: The Story of the Rock and Roll King, Henry Holt, 2015
- I, Galileo, Alfred A. Knopf, NY, 2012
- Plant a Little Seed, Roaring Brook Press, NY, 2012
- Fabulous, A Portrait of Andy Warhol, Henry Holt, 2011
- Django, World's Greatest Jazz Guitarist, Roaring Brook Press, NY, 2009
- Mama Went to Jail for the Vote, Little, Brown Books for Young Readers, 2005 (with Kathleen Karr and Malene Laugesen)
- The Daring Nellie Bly, Alfred A. Knopf, NY, 2003
- In My Grandmother's House, HarperCollins, NY, 2003
- Woody Guthrie, Poet of the People, Alfred A. Knopf, NY, 2001
- Rebus Riot!, Dial/Penguin, NY, 1997
- An Edible Alphabet, Dial/Penguin, NY, 1994

=== As illustrator ===
- The Princess of Borscht by Leda Schubert. Roaring Brook Press, NY, 2011
- Ida B. Wells by Walter Dean Myers. HarperCollins, NY, 2008
- Magic in the Margins by W. Nikola-Lisa. Houghton Mifflin, Boston, 2007
- Pompeii, Lost and Found by Mary Pope Osborne. Alfred A. Knopf, NY, 2006
- I, Dred Scott by Sheila P. Moses. Simon & Schuster, NY, 2005
- Moon Over Tennessee by Craig Crist Evan. Houghton Mifflin, Boston, 1999
- The Grapes of Wrath by John Steinbeck. Folio Society, London, England, England, 1998
- Breaking into Print by Stephen Krensky. Little, Brown & Co., Boston, 1996
- Putting the World to Sleep by Shelley Moore Thomas. Houghton Mifflin, Boston, 1995
- Green Mountain Ghosts, Ghouls, and Unsolved Mysteries by Joe Citro. Houghton Mifflin, Boston, 1994

== Awards ==
Christensen received a number of book awards including an American Library Association Schneider Family Book Award (for Django, World's Greatest Jazz Guitarist in 2010), a Kirkus "Best Children's Book of 2006" designation (for her illustrations in Pompeii, Lost and Found in 2006), an Oppenheim Toy Portfolio Gold Award (for The Daring Nellie Bly in 2004), and a Horn Book-Boston Globe Honor Award, a Parent's Choice Gold Award, a designation of "Best Book Of the Year" by Publishers Weekly, a "Notable Books" designation by the New York Times Book Review, and a New York Book Show Award (for Woody Guthrie, Poet of the People in 2001).

== Death ==
Christensen died of ovarian cancer on January 12, 2015, aged 63.
