= Penny Pot, New Jersey =

Populated place in Atlantic County, New Jersey, US

- Unincorporated community
- Location in Atlantic County (Inset: Atlantic County in New Jersey) Penny Pot (New Jersey) Penny Pot (the United States)
- Coordinates: 39°34′19″N 74°49′20″W
- Country: United States
- State: New Jersey
- County: Atlantic
- Borough: Folsom
- Elevation: 49 ft (15 m)
- Time zone: UTC−05:00 (Eastern (EST))
  - Summer (DST): UTC−04:00 (EDT)
- GNIS feature ID: 879222

Penny Pot is an unincorporated community within the borough of Folsom in Atlantic County, in the U.S. state of New Jersey.

== History ==
English settlers arrived in 1686 and named the settlement "Penny Pot" because it resembled the English countryside. The Hospitality Branch flows into the Great Egg Harbor River at Penny Pot, and a dam was built made of timbers salvaged from the hull of a British ship pirated during the Revolutionary War. The settlement was a group of houses around a tavern of the same name, and was described in 1915 as, "a settlement of other years, one large house remaining".
