= Linwood Public Schools =

School district in Atlantic County, New Jersey, US

Address
- 51 Belhaven Avenue Linwood, Atlantic County, New Jersey, 08221; United States
- Coordinates: 39.3472°N 74.574999°W

District information
- Grades: PreK-8
- Superintendent: Brian M. Pruitt
- Business administrator: Patricia Swanson
- Schools: 2

Students and staff
- Enrollment: 809 (as of 2020–21)
- Faculty: 71.0 FTEs
- Student–teacher ratio: 11.4:1

Other information
- District Factor Group: GH
- Website: www.linwoodschools.org
Ind.	Per pupil	District spending	Rank (*)	K-8 average	%± vs. average
1A	Total Spending	$18,089	58	$18,891	−4.2%
1	Budgetary Cost	15,648	70	14,159	10.5%
2	Classroom Instruction	9,227	64	8,659	6.6%
6	Support Services	2,493	63	2,167	15.0%
8	Administrative Cost	1,804	72	1,547	16.6%
10	Operations & Maintenance	1,956	74	1,612	21.3%
13	Extracurricular Activities	169	77	104	62.5%
16	Median Teacher Salary	61,475	45	61,136
Data from NJDoE 2014 Taxpayers' Guide to Education Spending. *Of K-8 districts with more than 750 students. Lowest spending=1; Highest=84

The Linwood Public Schools are a comprehensive community public school district that serves students in pre-kindergarten through eighth grade from Linwood, in Atlantic County, in the U.S. state of New Jersey.

As of the 2020–21 school year, the district, comprised of two schools, had an enrollment of 809 students and 71.0 classroom teachers (on an FTE basis), for a student–teacher ratio of 11.4:1.

The district had been classified by the New Jersey Department of Education as being in District Factor Group "GH", the third-highest of eight groupings. District Factor Groups organize districts statewide to allow comparison by common socioeconomic characteristics of the local districts. From lowest socioeconomic status to highest, the categories are A, B, CD, DE, FG, GH, I and J.

Students in public school for ninth through twelfth grades attend Mainland Regional High School, which also serves students from Northfield and Somers Point. The high school is located in Linwood. For the 1997-98 school year, Mainland Regional High School was recognized by the United States Department of Education as a National Blue Ribbon School. As of the 2023–24 school year, the high school had an enrollment of 1,171 students and 106.2 classroom teachers (on an FTE basis), for a student–teacher ratio of 11.0:1.

== Awards and recognition ==
During the 2008–09 school year, Seaview Elementary School was recognized with the National Blue Ribbon Schools Program Award of Excellence by the United States Department of Education, the highest award an American school can receive.

The district was selected as one of the top "100 Best Communities for Music Education in America 2006" by the American Music Conference.

== Schools ==
Schools in the district (with 2020–21 enrollment data from the National Center for Education Statistics) are:

Elementary school

- Seaview Elementary School with 429 students in grades PreK-4
  - Lori Care, principal

Middle school

- Belhaven Middle School with 378 students in grades 5-8
  - Jennifer Luff, principal

== Activities ==
Belhaven hosts a series of events throughout the year, including the Pep Rally, the People's Choice Awards, and the Blue and Gold Game. In the Pep Rally, every grade level puts on an act, and kids and teachers are presented awards for their outstanding achievement. In the People's Choice Awards, students get picked from their grade level teachers based on their achievements. In the Blue and Gold Game, the Blue (newer) teachers play basketball against the Gold (older) teachers, with each side including some eighth graders.

== Administration ==
Core members of the district's administration are:

- Brian M. Pruitt, superintendent
- Patricia Swanson, business administrator and board secretary

== Board of education ==
The district's board of education is comprised of nine members who set policy and oversee the fiscal and educational operation of the district through its administration. As a Type II school district, the board's trustees are elected directly by voters to serve three-year terms of office on a staggered basis, with three seats up for election each year held (since 2017) as part of the November general election. The board appoints a superintendent to oversee the district's day-to-day operations and a business administrator to supervise the business functions of the district.

In the November 2016 general election, voters approved a referendum changing the district from an appointed (Type I) school board to a (Type II) board hose members are elected by voters.
