= Port Republic School District =

School district in Atlantic County, New Jersey, US

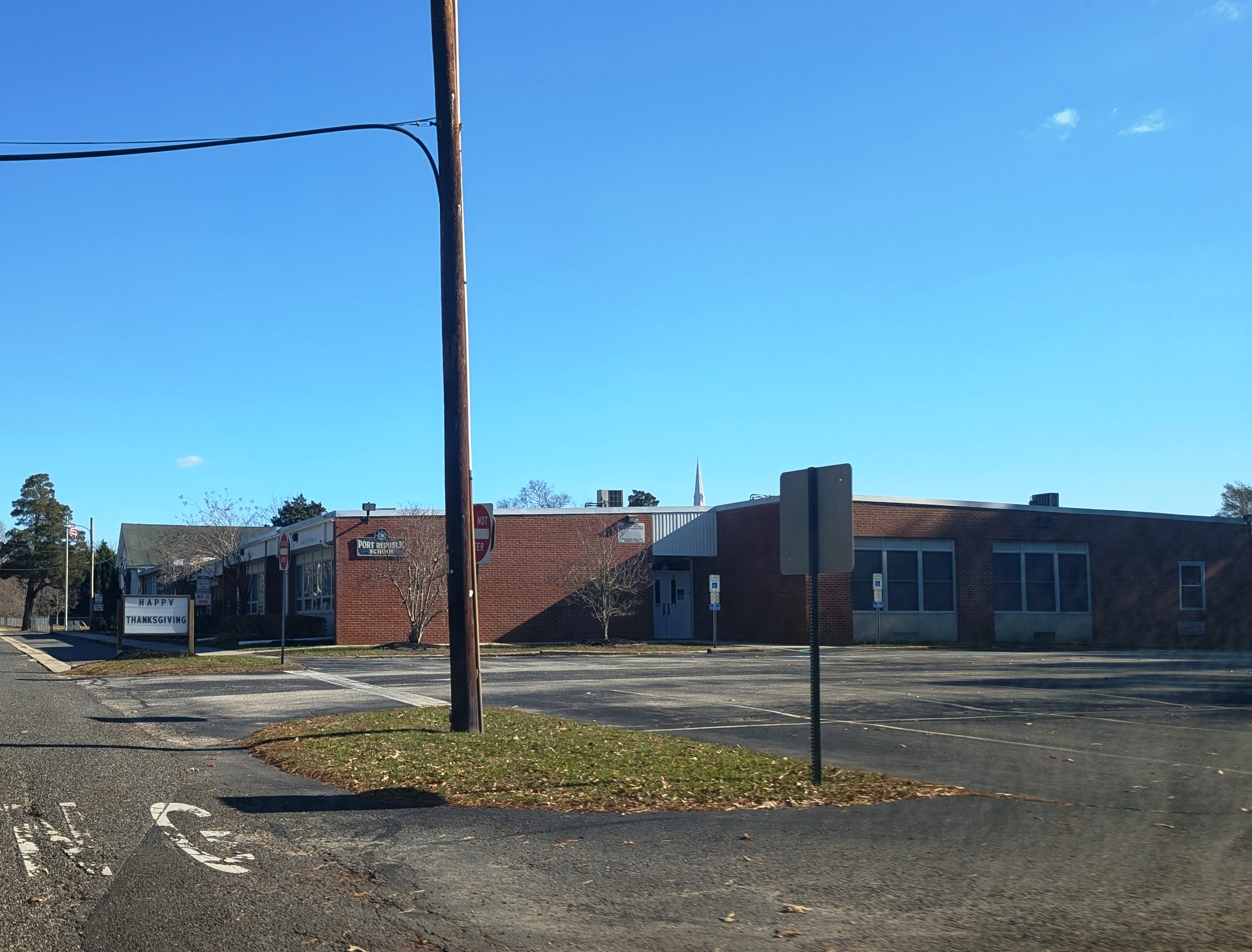
- Port Republic Elementary School, the only school in the district

Address
- 137 Pomona Avenue Port Republic, Atlantic County, New Jersey, 08241; United States
- Coordinates: 39.520857°N 74.494869°W

District information
- Grades: K-8
- Superintendent: Amanda Redrow
- Business administrator: Todd D'Anna
- Schools: 1

Students and staff
- Enrollment: 115 (as of 2023–24)
- Faculty: 11.4 FTEs
- Student–teacher ratio: 10.1:1

Other information
- District Factor Group: FG
- Website: portrepublicschool.wixsite.com/mysite
Ind.	Per pupil	District spending	Rank (*)	K-8 average	%± vs. average
1A	Total Spending	$16,723	16	$18,891	−11.5%
1	Budgetary Cost	10,658	4	14,159	−24.7%
2	Classroom Instruction	6,410	5	8,659	−26.0%
6	Support Services	2,289	30	2,167	5.6%
8	Administrative Cost	1,125	2	1,547	−27.3%
10	Operations & Maintenance	797	1	1,612	−50.6%
13	Extracurricular Activities	37	13	104	−64.4%
16	Median Teacher Salary	50,754	9	61,136
Data from NJDoE 2014 Taxpayers' Guide to Education Spending. *Of K-8 districts with up to 400 students. Lowest spending=1; Highest=71

The Port Republic School District is a community public school district that serves students in kindergarten through eighth grade from Port Republic, in Atlantic County, in the U.S. state of New Jersey.

As of the 2023–24 school year, the district, comprised of one school, had an enrollment of 115 students and 11.4 classroom teachers (on an FTE basis), for a student–teacher ratio of 10.1:1. In the 2016–17 school year, Port Republic was the 12th-smallest enrollment of any school district in the state, with 118 students.

The district had been classified by the New Jersey Department of Education as being in District Factor Group "FG", the fourth-highest of eight groupings. District Factor Groups organize districts statewide to allow comparison by common socioeconomic characteristics of the local districts. From lowest socioeconomic status to highest, the categories are A, B, CD, DE, FG, GH, I and J.

Students in ninth through twelfth grades attend Cedar Creek High School, which is located in the northern section of Egg Harbor City and opened to students in September 2010. The school is one of three high schools operated as part of the Greater Egg Harbor Regional High School District, which also includes the constituent municipalities of Egg Harbor City, Galloway Township, Hamilton Township, and Mullica Township, and participates in sending/receiving relationships with Port Republic and Washington Township (Burlington County). Cedar Creek High School is zoned to serve students from Egg Harbor City, Mullica Township, Port Republic and Washington Township, while students in portions of Galloway and Hamilton townships have the opportunity to attend Cedar Creek through the school of choice program or through attendance in magnet programs offered at Cedar Creek. As of the 2023–24 school year, the high school had an enrollment of 942 students and 78.5 classroom teachers (on an FTE basis), for a student–teacher ratio of 12.0:1.

== Schools ==
- Port Republic Elementary School served 111 students in kindergarten through eighth grade (as of the 2023–24 school year, per the National Center for Education Statistics.).

== Administration ==
Core members of the district's administration are:

- Amanda Redrow, superintendent and principal
- Todd D'Anna, business administrator and board secretary

== Board of education ==
The district's board of education is comprised of nine members who set policy and oversee the fiscal and educational operation of the district through its administration. As a Type I school district, the board's trustees are appointed by the mayor to serve three-year terms of office on a staggered basis, with either one or two members up for reappointment each year. Of the more than 600 school districts statewide, Port Republic is one of 15 districts with appointed school districts. The board appoints a superintendent to oversee the district's day-to-day operations and a business administrator to supervise the business functions of the district.
