= Atlantic County Department of Public Safety (New Jersey) =

County law enforcement agency of New Jersey

The Atlantic County Justice Facility
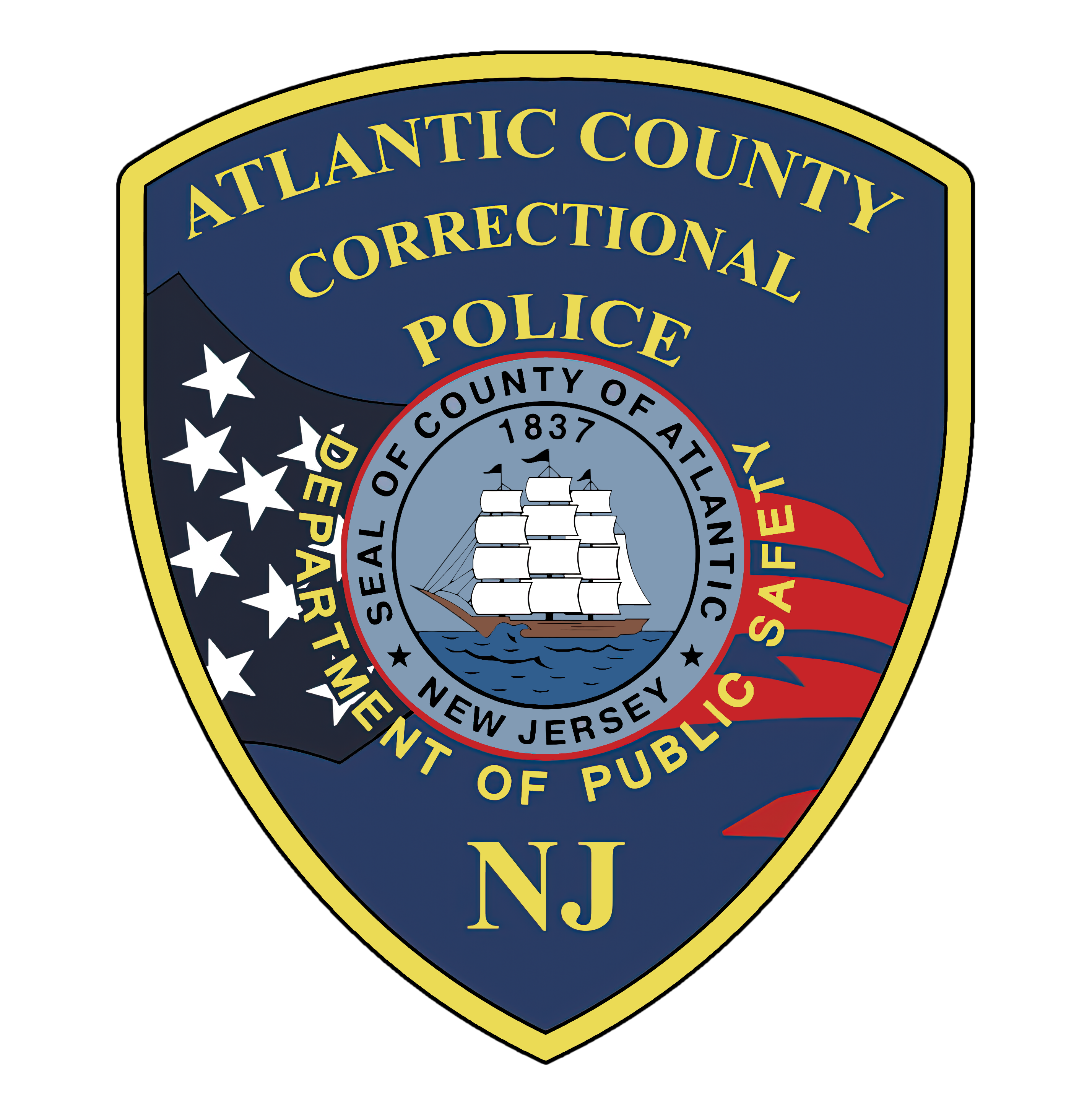

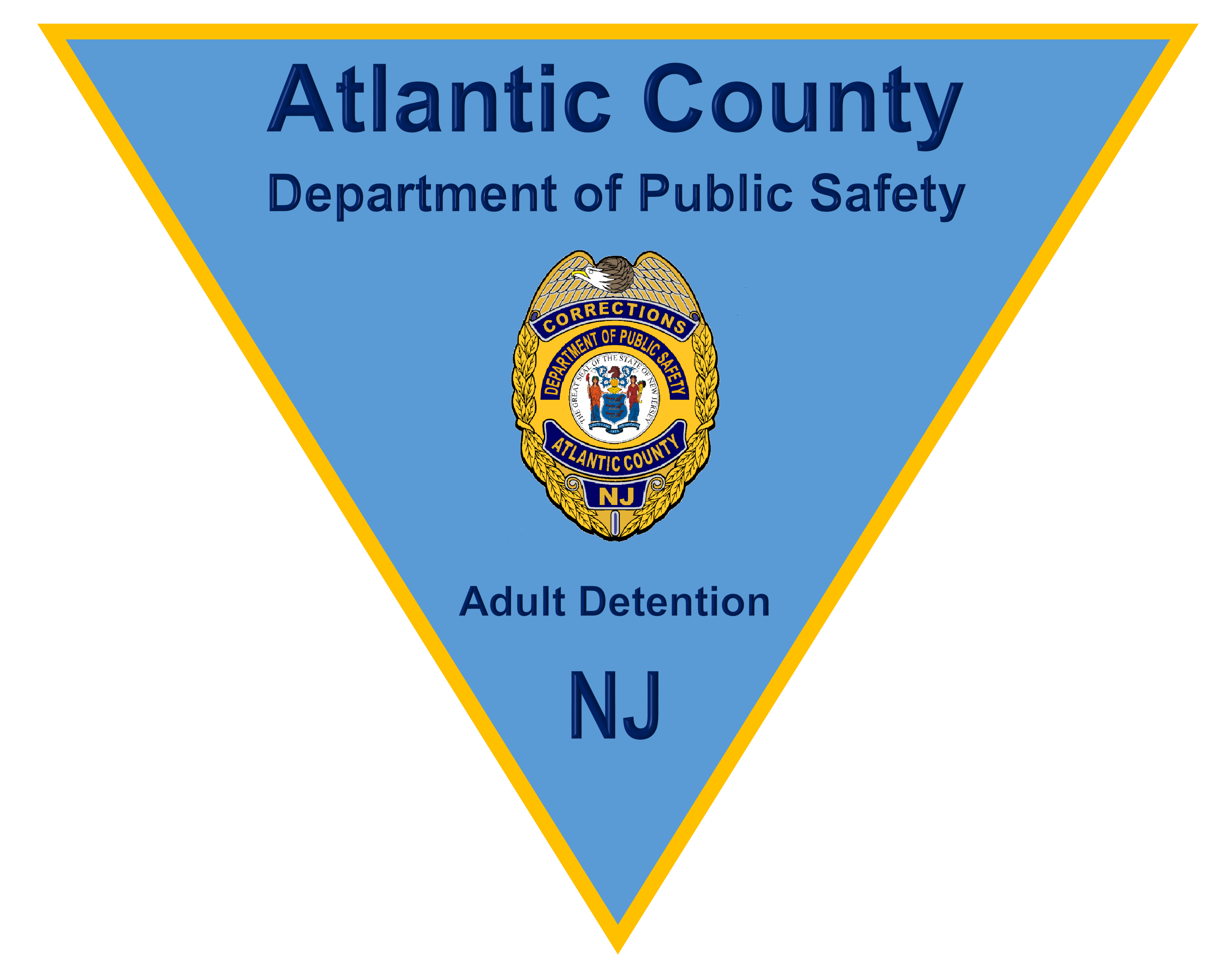
- Common name: The Atlantic County Jail
- Abbreviation: ACDPS
- Motto: All In As One!

Jurisdictional structure
- Operations jurisdiction: Atlantic County, New Jersey, United States
- General nature: Civilian police

Operational structure
- Headquarters: Mays Landing, New Jersey
- Correctional Police Officers: approx. 175
- Agency executive: David Kelsey, Warden

Facilities
- Jails: 1

Website
- ACDPS Website

== History ==
=== The Captain John Pennington Property ===
The first jail in Atlantic County (1837) was in a spring house on Captain John Pennington's property in Mays Landing, about a half mile down River Road. In 1840, a permanent jail was completed. It was a 28 by 40 feet sandstone structure designed by Thomas Ustik Walter, a Philadelphia architect best known for his work on the U.S. Capitol and its dome. This jail housed prisoners until 1932 and was then used for vocational training. For a short time in the 1970s, it was used for document storage. Other jails were completed in 1932 and then in 1962. The present Atlantic County Justice Facility was opened in September 1985. However, since the splitting of the Sheriff's Office in September 1987, the Department of Public Safety now controls the facility.

=== Gerard L. Gormley Justice Facility ===
The Gerard L. Gormley Justice Facility opened in 1985 and was built to house 398 inmates. Since that time, the facility has undergone substantial growth and expansion. It now houses an average of 1000 inmates with custody jurisdiction over an additional 250 inmates who are sentenced to various community programs.

The Atlantic County Department of Public Safety is charged with the operation of the Justice Facility. The New Jersey Administrative Office of the Courts has recognized the Justice Facility's inmate classification program by incorporating it into its statewide computer system for use by all associated counties in New Jersey. In October 1997, the Justice Facility opened its Correctional Police Officers Academy, certified by the New Jersey Police Training Commission, and graduated its first class in January 1998. The Academy trains all Atlantic County Correction Officers at Atlantic County Community College, and will accept trainees from other New Jersey Counties.

The Justice Facility is located at 5060 Atlantic Ave., Mays Landing, New Jersey. It is an Adult Detention Facility, housing male and female inmates who are pretrial, county sentenced, and in certain instances, state sentenced awaiting shipment or state inmates contracted to the Facility. The Facility has two main sections, the Main Jail Building and the Main Jail Annex.

== Structure ==
=== Current Chain Of Command Structure ===
- Warden David Kelsey
- Deputy Warden Michael Kelly
- Captain Bruce Carber
- Captain Steven Iuluicci
- Captain Eric Matlock

=== Community Release Programs ===
- Work Release

Work Release permits inmate participants to leave the facility and work or study in the community. The operating parameters of Work Release are clearly delineated in N.J.S.A. 10A:31-25. Eligibility criteria are incorporated in 10A:31-25.6. Inmates approved for participation in Work Release are permitted to leave the facility to attend work, educational opportunities, or care for their families. All inmates are provided pre - approved and verified schedules, work or study sites, and transportation both to and from the facility. The inmates employer must agree to allow the inmate to participate, and the employment must meet State standards. If either of these two conditions are not met, the employment is disallowed, and the inmate will be sent out on public service work assignments until approved employment is obtained. Verification Patrol Officers periodically check work or study sites to insure program compliance.

- Home Electronic Detention (HEDS)

The basic concept of the Home Detention program is that an electronic monitoring device is attached to the inmate and monitoring equipment is installed in the inmate's home. The inmate is then housed in their home. The monitoring device is equipped with an anti - tampering fail-safe device and the monitoring equipment is connected via telephone to the central monitoring station at the facility. If the inmate leaves home without permission or attempts to remove or otherwise circumvent the attached transmitting device, the central monitoring station is automatically alerted. Inmates are allowed to go to work, school, and other specified locations on a pre-approved basis. Transportation is also on a pre-approved basis, as is the route in which the inmate is allowed to take. This program also has the selected feature of monitoring the inmate for alcohol or breathalyzer test. This is done by a device which is connected to the equipment in the home. At random intervals when the inmate is home, an audible signal is sounded, and the inmate must take the test. A series of pre - established words are repeated by the inmate, and the inmate will blow air into this unit when instructed. The inmate's breath is then electronically checked for alcohol content and delivered to the central monitoring station. Mobile verification equipment and Verification Patrol Officers insure participants are actually at the approved locations when they are outside of their homes. Home Electronic Detention System or HEDS program permits a wider level of freedom than Work Release and enables the inmate to begin their reintegration into the community. The philosophy of "ZERO TOLERANCE" is adopted by this program and stringently enforced. This is the first complete step back into the community, and no inappropriate behavior is tolerated.

- Day Reporting (DRP)

The Day Reporting Program Phase allows inmates to live at home without electronic monitoring, and report to the Day Reporting Program Office at the Main Jail Annex of the Atlantic County Justice Facility two or more days per week and move about the community without first obtaining permission. While in the Day Reporting Program, the inmate participates in various public service work details. An inmate is directly sentenced by the courts to this program. Qualifying non profit organizations or municipalities may use Day Reporting (DRP) inmates for approved public service assignments. The persons supervising the inmates are orientated / instructed on how to do so. This supervision is exclusive of and independent of the field verification officers who randomly check the inmates while they are within the community.

The DRP inmate reports to the facility as directed or scheduled. An average DRP inmate reports to the facility at 7:00 AM, two consecutive days a week. These days are selected during orientation into the program. Employed inmates are given preference for scheduling to match their days off.

=== Academy ===
Eligible candidates will be appointed as Correctional Police Officer Recruit and will be required to satisfactorily complete a 16-week, NJ Police Training Commission course, at the Atlantic County Police Academy. The Atlantic County Police Academy conducts basic course for county correctional police officers, with instructors who are certified by the Police Training Commission. Training classes include arrest, search and seizure, use of force, criminal law, first aid/CPR, weaponry, un-armed defensive tactics, intensive physical conditioning, security concepts, human relations and professional development. Those who successfully complete the training program will be appointed as a correctional police officer and will serve a one-year probation period. The academy training is divided into three areas of training:

- Physical Fitness: The Physical Education and Self-Defense Program emphasizes physical conditioning which includes running and various strength building exercises.
- Academics: The Academic portion of the Academy training will include a variety of college level courses consisting of studies such as psychological and sociological issues, Language and Communications skills, Criminal Law, Constitutional Issues, Correctional and Police Practice procedures, etc. There will be comprehensive examinations and written assignments, in order for candidates to demonstrate their knowledge. Such examinations and written assignments also serve as a vetting system for those potentially not qualified to exercise the duties of a Correctional Police Officer.
- Firearms Training: Firearms Training includes firearm safety and weapon qualifications.

=== Jurisdiction and Authority of Correctional Police Officers ===
New Jersey State/County Correctional Police Officers, Parole Officers and Correctional Police Investigators are authorized to exercise police officer powers statewide. With this authority, Correctional Police Officers are required to enforce NJRS 2C (New Jersey Criminal Code) within the scope of their employment.

All correctional police officers of the State of New Jersey, parole officers employed by the State Parole Board and investigators in the Department of Corrections, who have been or who may hereafter be appointed or employed, shall, by virtue of such appointment or employment and in addition to any other power or authority, be empowered to act as officers for the detection, apprehension, arrest and conviction of offenders against the law.

New Jersey Correctional Police Officers are authorized to carry on duty the Glock 22/23 .40. Correctional Police Officers may optionally qualify to carry an authorized off-duty firearm. All off-duty firearms and ammunition must conform to the approved list provided by the training unit.[5]

=== Correctional Police Officer Responsibilities ===
The Atlantic County Correctional Police Officer is responsible, during an assigned tour of duty, to ensure the custody, safety and care of criminal offenders confined in the Atlantic County Justice Facility.
