= Hospitality Branch =

Coordinates: 39.60811°N 74.90907°W

The Hospitality Branch is a 15.8-mile-long (25.4 km) tributary of the Great Egg Harbor River in southeastern New Jersey in the United States.

The Hospitality Branch starts several miles east of Glassboro and joins the Great Egg Harbor River at Penny Pot.

== See also ==
- List of rivers of New Jersey
