= Egg Harbor City School District =

School district in Atlantic County, New Jersey, US

Address
- 730 Havana Avenue Egg Harbor City, Atlantic County, New Jersey, 08215; United States
- Coordinates: 39.53461°N 74.641058°W

District information
- Grades: PreK-8
- Superintendent: Adrienne Shulby
- Business administrator: Patricia Palmieri
- Schools: 2

Students and staff
- Enrollment: 578 (as of 2023–24)
- Faculty: 60.0 FTEs
- Student–teacher ratio: 9.6:1

Other information
- District Factor Group: A
- Website: www.ehcs.k12.nj.us
Ind.	Per pupil	District spending	Rank (*)	K-8 average	%± vs. average
1A	Total Spending	$22,829	60	$18,891	20.8%
1	Budgetary Cost	14,040	32	14,159	−0.8%
2	Classroom Instruction	8,287	26	8,659	−4.3%
6	Support Services	2,677	53	2,167	23.5%
8	Administrative Cost	1,485	17	1,547	−4.0%
10	Operations & Maintenance	1,455	23	1,612	−9.7%
13	Extracurricular Activities	136	36	104	30.8%
16	Median Teacher Salary	56,928	18	61,136
Data from NJDoE 2014 Taxpayers' Guide to Education Spending. *Of K-8 districts with 401-750 students. Lowest spending=1; Highest=64

The Egg Harbor City School District is a comprehensive community public school district responsible for the education of children in pre-kindergarten through eighth grade from Egg Harbor City, in Atlantic County, in the U.S. state of New Jersey.

As of the 2023–24 school year, the district, comprised of two schools, had an enrollment of 578 students and 60.0 classroom teachers (on an FTE basis), for a student–teacher ratio of 9.6:1.

Students in ninth through twelfth grades attend Cedar Creek High School, which is located in the northern section of Egg Harbor City and opened to students in September 2010. As of the 2023–24 school year, the high school had an enrollment of 942 students and 78.5 classroom teachers (on an FTE basis), for a student–teacher ratio of 12.0:1. The school is one of three high schools operated as part of the Greater Egg Harbor Regional High School District, which also includes the constituent municipalities of Egg Harbor City, Galloway Township, Hamilton Township and Mullica Township, and participates in sending/receiving relationships with Port Republic and Washington Township (Burlington County). Cedar Creek High School is zoned to serve students from Egg Harbor City, Mullica Township, Port Republic and Washington Township, while students in portions of Galloway and Hamilton townships have the opportunity to attend Cedar Creek through the school of choice program or through attendance in magnet programs offered at Cedar Creek.

== History ==
In 1948, during de jure educational segregation in the United States, the district had a school for black children.

The district had been classified by the New Jersey Department of Education as being in District Factor Group "A", the lowest of eight groupings. District Factor Groups organize districts statewide to allow comparison by common socioeconomic characteristics of the local districts. From lowest socioeconomic status to highest, the categories are A, B, CD, DE, FG, GH, I and J.

== Schools ==
Schools in the district (with 2023–24 enrollment data from the National Center for Education Statistics) are:

Elementary school

- Charles L. Spragg School with 281 students in PreK to Grade 3
  - Adrienne Shulby, principal

Middle school

- Egg Harbor City Community School with 287 students in grades 4 to 8
  - Gina Forester, principal

== Administration ==
Core members of the district's administration are:

- Adrienne Shulby, superintendent of schools
- Patricia Palmieri, business administrator and board secretary

== Board of education ==
The district's board of education, comprised of seven members, sets policy and oversees the fiscal and educational operation of the district through its administration. As a Type II school district, the board's trustees are elected directly by voters to serve three-year terms of office on a staggered basis, with either two or three seats up for election each year held (since 2012) as part of the November general election. The board appoints a superintendent to oversee the district's day-to-day operations and a business administrator to supervise the business functions of the district.
