= Atlantic County, New Jersey =

County in New Jersey, United States

- County
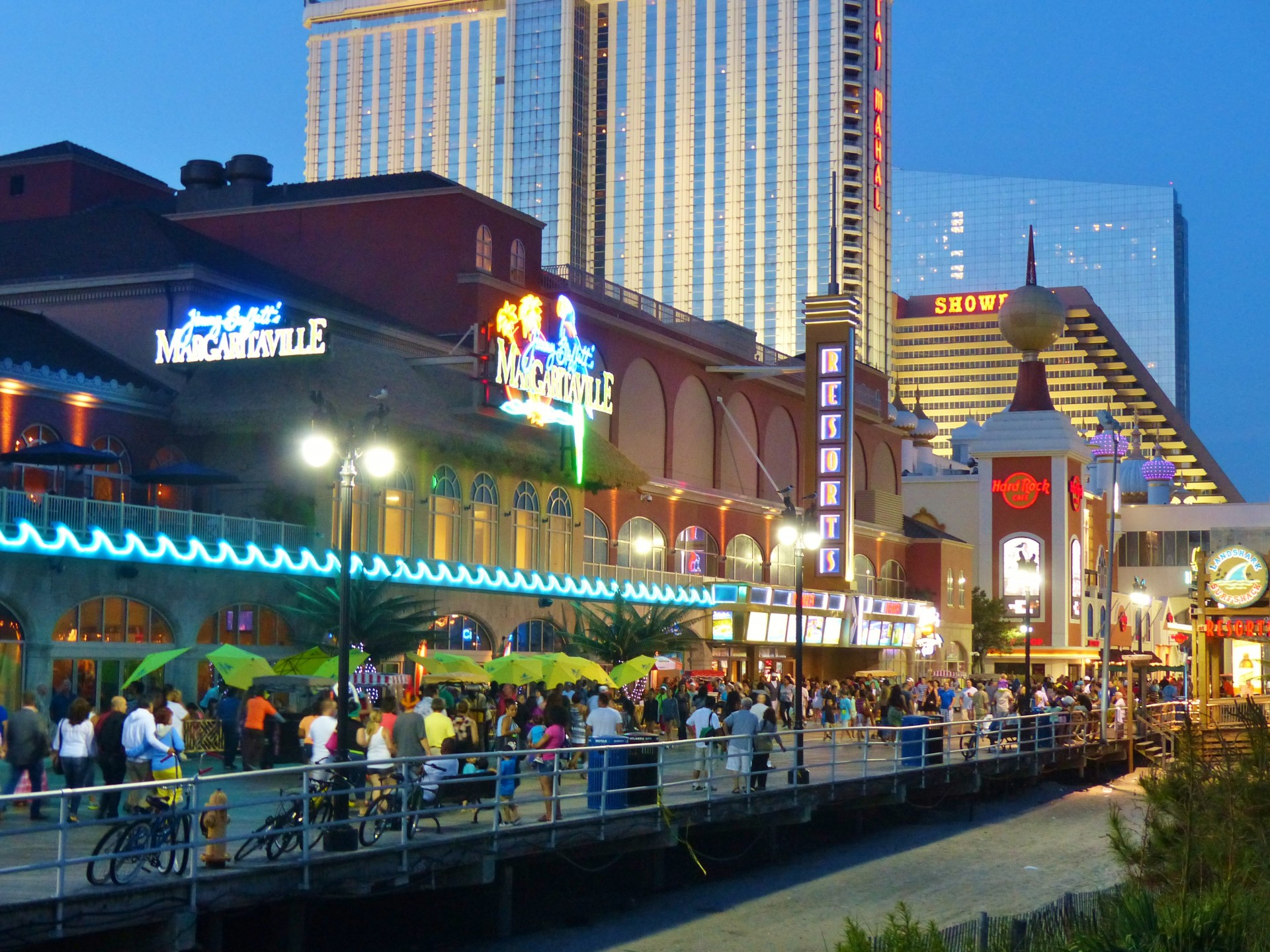
- Atlantic City's boardwalk, the nation's first boardwalk, at night

- Flag Seal Logo

- Location within the U.S. state of New Jersey
- Interactive map of Atlantic County, New Jersey
- Coordinates: 39.47°N 74.64°W
- Country: United States
- State: New Jersey
- Founded: 1837
- Named for: Atlantic Ocean
- Seat: Mays Landing
- Largest municipality: Egg Harbor Township (population); Galloway Township (total area); Hamilton Township (land area)

Government
  - County executive: Dennis Levinson (R, term ends December 31, 2027)

Area
  - Total: 671.84 sq mi (1,740.1 km^{2})
  - Land: 555.51 sq mi (1,438.8 km^{2})
  - Water: 116.32 sq mi (301.3 km^{2}) 17.3%

Population (2020)
  - Total: 274,534
  - Estimate (2025): 278,657 ▲
  - Density: 494.20/sq mi (190.81/km^{2})
- Time zone: UTC−5 (Eastern)
  - Summer (DST): UTC−4 (EDT)
- Congressional district: 2nd
- Website: www.atlanticcountynj.gov

Atlantic County is a county in the U.S. state of New Jersey. As of the 2020 census, the county was the state's 15th-most-populous county, with a population of 274,534, a drop of 15 from the 2010 census count of 274,549. The United States Census Bureau's Population Estimates Program estimated a 2025 population of 278,657, an increase of 4,123 (+1.5%) from the 2020 decennial census. Its county seat is the Mays Landing section of Hamilton Township. The county is part of the Jersey Shore region of the state.

The most populous place in Atlantic County is Egg Harbor Township, with 47,842 residents at the time of the 2020 census; Galloway Township, covered 115.21 square miles (298.4 km^{2}), the largest total area of any municipality, though Hamilton Township has the largest land area, covering 111.13 square miles (287.8 km^{2}). Atlantic County forms the Atlantic City–Hammonton metropolitan statistical area, which is part of the Philadelphia metropolitan area (which is formally designated as the Philadelphia–Camden–Wilmington, PA–NJ–DE–MD Metropolitan Statistical Area).

== History ==
=== Etymology ===
The county was named after the Atlantic Ocean, which borders the county's eastern coast.

=== History ===
Since the 6th millennium BC, Native American people have inhabited New Jersey. By the 17th century, the Absegami tribe of the Unalachtigo Lenape tribe – "people near the ocean" – stayed along the streams and back bays of what is now Atlantic County. The group referred to the broader area as Scheyichbi – "land bordering the ocean". European settlement by the Dutch, Sweden, and England contributed to the demise of the indigenous people. In 1674, West Jersey was established, and its provincial government designated the court of Burlington County in 1681, splitting off Gloucester County five years later from the southern portion. This county was bounded by the Mullica River to the north, the Atlantic Ocean to the east, and the Great Egg Harbor River and Tuckahoe River to the south. Great Egg Harbour Township, also called New Weymouth and later just Egg Harbor, was designated in 1693 from the eastern portions of Gloucester County.

The region's early European settlers, many of them Quakers, lived along the area's waterways. In 1695, John Somers purchased 300 acres (120 ha) of land on the northern shore of the Great Egg Harbor Bay in 1695, the same year he began ferry service across the bay to Cape May County. His son, Richard, built Somers Mansion between 1720 and 1726, which is the oldest home in existence in the county. Daniel Leeds first surveyed the coastal waters of Egg Harbor in 1698, eventually finding Leeds Point. In 1735, according to folklore, Mother Leeds gave birth to her 13th child in the area during a strange thunderstorm; this child would become the Jersey Devil. In the early 18th century, George May founded Mays Landing.

In 1774, the northern portion of Egg Harbor Township became Galloway Township. In 1785, residents in what is now Atlantic County requested to split from Gloucester County to the New Jersey legislature, wanting a local court. Mays Landing – the region's largest community at the time, had more saloons than churches. Criminals could escape custody before reaching Gloucester City on a four-day wagon ride. In 1798, the western portion split off to become Weymouth Township, and in 1813, the northwestern portion partitioned to become Hamilton Township. On February 7, 1837, the New Jersey legislature designated Atlantic County from Galloway, Hamilton, Weymouth, and Egg Harbor townships, choosing Mays Landing as the county seat. In the same year, the Board of Freeholders was established as the county government. As of the 1830 census, the townships making up Atlantic County only had a population of 8,164, making it the least populated New Jersey county. By that time, a continuous line of houses extended from Somers Point to Absecon.

Mullica Township was established from Galloway Township in 1837. In 1852, Dr. Jonathan Pitney recommended Absecon Island as a health resort, and formed the Camden and Atlantic Railroad to construct the line from Camden to the coast. The company purchased land from Atlantic and Galloway Townships in 1853, then promoted and sold the lots. Atlantic City formed on May 1, 1854, in advance of the rail line opening on July 4 of that year. In 1858, Egg Harbor City was formed from portions of Galloway and Mullica townships. In 1866, Hammonton was founded from Hamilton and Mullica townships. A year later, portions of Hamilton Township split off to become Buena Vista Township. In 1872, Absecon was split from portions of Egg Harbor and Galloway townships. By 1885, more than half of the county's population lived in Atlantic City, and by 1910 this more than two-thirds of the county lived there.

With more people moving to the area in the late 1800s into the early 1900s, several municipalities were created in short succession – Margate City (then called South Atlantic City) in 1885, Somers Point in 1886, Pleasantville and Linwood in 1889, Brigantine in 1890, Longport in 1898, Ventnor in 1903, Northfield and Port Republic in 1905, and Folsom in 1906. On May 17, 1906, the eastern coastal boundary of Atlantic County was established. The final municipalities in the county to be created were Corbin City from Weymouth Township in 1922, Estell Manor from Weymouth Township in 1925, and Buena from Buena Township in 1948. In 1938, the county's western border was clarified with Camden and Burlington counties using geographic coordinates. After a peak in prominence in the 1920s during the prohibition era, Atlantic City began declining in population in the 1950s as tourism declined. The county's growth shifted to the mainland.

In 1973, the New Jersey Coastal Area Facilities Review Act required additional state permitting for construction in the eastern half of the county. In the same ballot as the 1976 presidential election, 56.8% of New Jersey voters approved an initiative to allow legalized gambling in Atlantic City. Two years later, Resorts Atlantic City opened as the first casino in the city, and there were 15 by 1990. Since then, five have closed, including four in 2014, while two casinos – the Borgata and Ocean Resort Casino – have opened. Hard Rock Hotel & Casino Atlantic City opened in 2018, refurbishing the former Trump Taj Mahal. In 1978, Congress created the Pinelands National Reserve, which created the Pinelands Commission and a management policy for the seven counties in the Pine Barrens, including Atlantic County. Concurrent with the 1980 Presidential election, Atlantic County residents voted in favor to create a new state of South Jersey, along with five other counties in a nonbinding referendum.

== Geography ==
Atlantic County is located about 100 miles (160 km) south of New York City and about 60 miles (97 km) southeast of Philadelphia. It is roughly 30 mi (48 km) in width by 20 mi (32 km) in height. According to the U.S. Census Bureau, as of the 2020 Census, the county had a total area of 671.84 square miles (1,740.1 km^{2}), of which 555.51 square miles (1,438.8 km^{2}) was land (82.7%) and 116.32 square miles (301.3 km^{2}) was water (17.3%).

The county lies along the Atlantic Coastal Plain, with sea level and the Atlantic Ocean to the east. Adjacent to the coast are three barrier islands – Absecon Island (Which contains Atlantic City, Ventnor, Margate, and Longport), Brigantine Island, and Little Beach. To the west of the barrier islands, 4 mi (6.4 km) stretch of marshlands, inlets, and waterways connect and form the Intracoastal Waterway. Beneath the county is a mile of clay and sand that contains the Kirkwood–Cohansey aquifer, which supplies fresh groundwater for all of the streams and rivers in the region. The interior of the county is part of the Pine Barrens, which covers the southern third of New Jersey, and is prone to forest fires. Lowland areas are swampy and contain pitch pine or white cedar trees. Upland areas in the west of the county are hilly, containing oak and pine trees. The highest elevation in the county – about 150 ft (46 m) above sea level – is found near the border with Camden County, on the west side of Hammonton. The county's western boundary with Burlington and Camden counties, clarified in 1761, is a manmade line about halfway between the Atlantic Ocean and the Delaware Bay.

=== Climate ===
Mays Landing, New Jersey

Climate chart (precipitation, max. and min. temperature)
J	F	M	A	M	J	J	A	S	O	N	D
3.2 41 24	3 44 27	4.2 52 33	3.6 62 42	3.4 71 51	3.1 81 61	3.7 86 67	4.1 84 65	3.2 77 57	3.4 67 46	3.3 56 37	3.7 46 28
- █ Average max. and min. temperatures in °F
- █ Precipitation totals in inches
- Source: The Weather Channel
Metric conversion
J	F	M	A	M	J	J	A	S	O	N	D
82 5 −4	76 7 −3	107 11 1	92 17 6	85 22 11	79 27 16	94 30 19	104 29 18	80 25 14	87 19 8	83 13 3	94 8 −2
- █ Average max. and min. temperatures in °C
- █ Precipitation totals in mm

In recent years, average temperatures in the county seat of Mays Landing have ranged from a low of 24 °F (−4 °C) in January to a high of 86 °F (30 °C) in July, although a record low of −11 °F (−24 °C) was recorded in February 1979 and a record high of 106 °F (41 °C) was recorded in June 1969. Average monthly precipitation ranged from 2.99 inches (76 mm) in February to 4.21 inches (107 mm) in March.

The county has a humid subtropical climate (Cfa). Average monthly temperatures in central Atlantic City range from 33.9 °F (1.1 °C) in January to 75.2 °F (24.0 °C) in July, while in Folsom they range from 32.7 °F (0.4 °C) in January to 76.3 °F (24.6 °C) in July.

In December 1992, a nor'easter produced the highest tide on record in Atlantic City, 9.0 ft (2.7 m) above mean lower low water. Former Hurricane Sandy struck near Brigantine as an extratropical cyclone, which produced an all-time minimum barometric pressure of 948.5 mbar (28.01 inHg) and wind gusts to 91 mph (146 km/h) in Atlantic City, as well as a storm surge that inundated low-lying areas. Three people died in the county during the storm, and damage was estimated at $300 million (2012 USD).

== Demographics ==
Historical population
Census	Pop.	Note	%±
1840	8,726		—
1850	8,961		2.7%
1860	11,786		31.5%
1870	14,093		19.6%
1880	18,704		32.7%
1890	28,836		54.2%
1900	46,402		60.9%
1910	71,894		54.9%
1920	83,914		16.7%
1930	124,823		48.8%
1940	124,066		−0.6%
1950	132,399		6.7%
1960	160,880		21.5%
1970	175,043		8.8%
1980	194,119		10.9%
1990	224,327		15.6%
2000	252,552		12.6%
2010	274,549		8.7%
2020	274,534		0.0%
2025 (est.)	278,657		1.5%
Historical sources: 1790-1990; 1970-2010 2010 2020

=== 2020 census ===
As of the 2020 census, the county had a population of 274,534. The median age was 42.5 years. 20.6% of residents were under the age of 18 and 18.9% of residents were 65 years of age or older. For every 100 females there were 93.1 males, and for every 100 females age 18 and over there were 90.2 males age 18 and over. 85.1% of residents lived in urban areas, while 14.9% lived in rural areas.

The racial makeup of the county was 57.1% White, 15.1% Black or African American, 0.5% American Indian and Alaska Native, 7.9% Asian, 0.1% Native Hawaiian and Pacific Islander, 9.9% from some other race, and 9.3% from two or more races. Hispanic or Latino residents of any race comprised 19.6% of the population.

There were 106,716 households in the county, of which 28.6% had children under the age of 18 living with them and 31.0% had a female householder with no spouse or partner present. About 29.0% of all households were made up of individuals and 13.3% had someone living alone who was 65 years of age or older.

There were 132,038 housing units, of which 19.2% were vacant. Among occupied housing units, 64.6% were owner-occupied and 35.4% were renter-occupied. The homeowner vacancy rate was 1.9% and the rental vacancy rate was 7.9%.

Atlantic County, New Jersey – Racial and ethnic composition Note: the US Census treats Hispanic/Latino as an ethnic category. This table excludes Latinos from the racial categories and assigns them to a separate category. Hispanics/Latinos may be of any race.
Race / Ethnicity (NH = Non-Hispanic)	Pop 1980	Pop 1990	Pop 2000	Pop 2010	Pop 2020	% 1980	% 1990	% 2000	% 2010	% 2020
White alone (NH)	151,272	165,233	161,486	160,871	148,858	77.93%	73.66%	63.94%	58.59%	54.22%
Black or African American alone (NH)	33,637	37,734	42,691	40,882	39,022	17.33%	16.82%	16.90%	14.89%	14.21%
Native American or Alaska Native alone (NH)	271	491	419	488	357	0.14%	0.22%	0.17%	0.18%	0.13%
Asian alone (NH)	958	4,565	12,662	20,419	21,563	0.49%	2.03%	5.01%	7.44%	7.85%
Native Hawaiian or Pacific Islander alone (NH)	x	x	77	60	82	x	x	0.03%	0.02%	0.03%
Other race alone (NH)	391	187	298	463	1,343	0.20%	0.08%	0.12%	0.17%	0.49%
Mixed race or Multiracial (NH)	x	x	4,190	5,125	9,596	x	x	1.66%	1.87%	3.50%
Hispanic or Latino (any race)	7,590	16,117	30,729	46,241	53,713	3.91%	7.18%	12.17%	16.84%	19.57%
Total	194,119	224,327	252,552	274,549	274,534	100.00%	100.00%	100.00%	100.00%	100.00%

=== 2010 census ===
The 2010 United States census counted 274,549 people, 102,847 households, and 68,702 families in the county. The population density was 494.1 inhabitants per square mile (190.8/km^{2}). There were 126,647 housing units at an average density of 227.9 per square mile (88.0/km^{2}). The racial makeup was 65.40% (179,566) White, 16.08% (44,138) Black or African American, 0.38% (1,050) Native American, 7.50% (20,595) Asian, 0.03% (92) Pacific Islander, 7.36% (20,218) from other races, and 3.24% (8,890) from two or more races. Hispanic or Latino of any race were 16.84% (46,241) of the population.

Of the 102,847 households, 29.8% had children under the age of 18; 45.6% were married couples living together; 15.5% had a female householder with no husband present and 33.2% were non-families. Of all households, 26.9% were made up of individuals and 10.8% had someone living alone who was 65 years of age or older. The average household size was 2.61 and the average family size was 3.17.

23.3% of the population were under the age of 18, 9.3% from 18 to 24, 24.6% from 25 to 44, 28.7% from 45 to 64, and 14.2% who were 65 years of age or older. The median age was 39.9 years. For every 100 females, the population had 94.2 males. For every 100 females ages 18 and older there were 91 males.

== Government ==
=== County government ===
In 1974, Atlantic County voters changed the county governmental form under the Optional County Charter Law to the County executive form. Atlantic County joins Bergen, Essex, Hudson and Mercer counties as one of the five of 21 New Jersey counties with an elected executive. The charter provides for a directly elected executive and a nine-member Atlantic County Board of County Commissioners, responsible for legislation. The executive is elected to a four-year term and the freeholders are elected to staggered three-year terms, of which four are elected from the county on an at-large basis and five of the freeholders represent equally populated districts. In 2016, freeholders were paid $20,000 a year, while the freeholder chairman was paid an annual salary of $21,500.

As of 2025, Atlantic County Executive is Dennis Levinson (R, Northfield), whose four-year term of office ends December 31, 2027. Members of the Board of County Commissioners are (with terms for chair and vice-chair ending December 31):

District	Commissioner
Commissioner District 1: Atlantic City, Egg Harbor Township (part), Longport, Margate City, and Ventnor City.	Ernest D. Coursey (D, Atlantic City, 2025)
Commissioner District 2: Absecon, Egg Harbor Township (part), Linwood, Northfield, Somers Point and Pleasantville	Chair Maureen Kern (R, Somers Point, 2027)
Commissioner District 3: Egg Harbor Township (part) and Hamilton Township (part)	Andrew Parker III (R, Egg Harbor Township, 2026)
Commissioner District 4: Brigantine, Galloway Township, Egg Harbor Township (part), and Port Republic	Richard R. Dase (R, Galloway Township, 2025)
Commissioner District 5: Buena, Buena Vista Township, Corbin City, Egg Harbor City, Estell Manor, Folsom, Hamilton Township (part), Hammonton, Mullica Township and Weymouth Township	Vice-chair James A. Bertino (R, Hammonton, 2027)
Commissioner At-Large	Michael Ruffu (R, Margate, 2027)
Commissioner At-Large:	June Byrnes (R, Somers Point, 2026)
Commissioner At-Large	Amy L. Gatto (R, Hamilton Township, 2025)
Commissioner At-Large:	John W. Risley (R, Egg Harbor Township, 2026)

Democrats have not won a county-wide office since 2020. Pursuant to Article VII Section II of the New Jersey State Constitution, each county in New Jersey is required to have three elected administrative officials known as "constitutional officers." These officers are the County Clerk and County Surrogate (both elected for five-year terms of office) and the County Sheriff (elected for a three-year term). Atlantic County's constitutional officers are:

Title	Representative
County Clerk	Joseph J. Giralo (R, 2026, Hammonton)
Sheriff	Joe O'Donoghue (R, 2026, Egg Harbor Township)
Surrogate	James Curcio (R, 2025, Hammonton)

The Atlantic County Prosecutor is William E. Reynolds of Absecon, New Jersey, who took office in June 2022 after being nominated the previous month on May 16, 2022, by Governor of New Jersey Phil Murphy and receiving confirmation on August 8, 2022, from the New Jersey Senate. Atlantic County, along with Cape May County, is part of Vicinage 1 of New Jersey Superior Court. The Atlantic County Civil Courthouse Complex is in Atlantic City, while criminal cases are heard in May's Landing; the Assignment Judge for Vicinage 1 is Michael Blee A.J.S.C.

=== Federal representatives ===
The 2nd Congressional District covers all of Atlantic County. For the 119th United States Congress, New Jersey's 2nd congressional district is represented by Jeff Van Drew (R, Dennis Township).

=== State representatives ===
The 23 municipalities of Atlantic County are part of four legislative districts.

District	Senator	Assembly	Municipalities
1st	Mike Testa (R)	Antwan McClellan (R) Erik K. Simonsen (R)	Corbin City, Estell Manor and Weymouth Township. The remainder of this district covers portions of Cape May County & Cumberland County.
2nd	Vincent J. Polistina (R)	Don Guardian (R) Maureen Rowan (D)	Absecon City, Atlantic City, Brigantine, Egg Harbor Township, Galloway Township, Hamilton Township, Linwood, Longport, Margate City, Northfield, Pleasantville, Port Republic, Somers Point and Ventnor City.
4th	Paul D. Moriarty (D)	Dan Hutchinson (D) Cody Miller (D)	Buena and Buena Vista Township. The remainder of this district includes portions of Camden County and Gloucester County.
8th	Latham Tiver (R)	Andrea Katz (D) Anthony Angelozzi (D)	Egg Harbor City, Folsom, Hammonton, and Mullica Township. The remainder of this district includes portions of Burlington County.

== Politics ==
United States presidential election results for Atlantic County, New Jersey
Year	Republican		Democratic		Third party(ies)	
Year	No.	%	No.	%	No.	%
1896	5,005	66.06%	2,233	29.47%	338	4.46%
1900	6,122	67.68%	2,566	28.37%	358	3.96%
1904	7,933	70.42%	3,064	27.20%	268	2.38%
1908	8,822	63.71%	4,578	33.06%	448	3.24%
1912	4,422	31.67%	4,885	34.99%	4,656	33.35%
1916	9,713	62.88%	5,467	35.39%	267	1.73%
1920	21,245	76.63%	5,753	20.75%	727	2.62%
1924	27,936	73.63%	6,937	18.28%	3,066	8.08%
1928	37,238	65.95%	19,152	33.92%	75	0.13%
1932	31,264	51.88%	28,071	46.58%	926	1.54%
1936	24,680	38.15%	39,605	61.22%	403	0.62%
1940	30,551	45.74%	36,155	54.13%	92	0.14%
1944	25,593	46.71%	28,972	52.87%	229	0.42%
1948	31,608	54.43%	25,313	43.59%	1,150	1.98%
1952	40,259	58.03%	28,953	41.73%	163	0.23%
1956	44,698	65.70%	21,668	31.85%	1,672	2.46%
1960	39,158	50.88%	36,129	46.94%	1,682	2.19%
1964	25,626	32.85%	50,945	65.30%	1,448	1.86%
1968	32,807	42.15%	35,581	45.71%	9,446	12.14%
1972	45,667	59.54%	28,203	36.77%	2,830	3.69%
1976	36,733	45.56%	41,965	52.05%	1,932	2.40%
1980	37,973	49.83%	31,286	41.06%	6,943	9.11%
1984	49,158	59.33%	33,240	40.12%	453	0.55%
1988	44,748	56.33%	34,047	42.86%	647	0.81%
1992	34,279	37.96%	39,633	43.89%	16,386	18.15%
1996	29,538	35.33%	44,434	53.15%	9,629	11.52%
2000	35,593	39.07%	52,880	58.04%	2,629	2.89%
2004	49,487	46.64%	55,746	52.54%	864	0.81%
2008	49,902	41.85%	67,830	56.88%	1,517	1.27%
2012	46,522	41.04%	65,600	57.88%	1,222	1.08%
2016	52,690	44.64%	60,924	51.61%	4,427	3.75%
2020	64,438	46.02%	73,808	52.71%	1,785	1.27%
2024	65,817	50.72%	61,879	47.69%	2,063	1.59%

In national elections, Atlantic County is competitive, in contrast to the other three counties on the Jersey Shore– Monmouth, Ocean, and Cape May counties– which tend to lean Republican. The county has gotten less Democratic since Democrat Barack Obama won it by over 15% in 2008 and 2012. In 2020, Democrat Joe Biden won it by just 7%, even as he won New Jersey by 16%.

The county flipped to Donald Trump in 2024, having previously not voted for a Republican presidential candidate since George H. W. Bush in 1988. The county also voted Republican in the 2024 U.S. Senate election.

It is considered a swing county in down-ballot races, and Republicans hold most of its seats in the state legislature and in county-level offices. As of October 1, 2021, there were a total of 209,135 registered voters in Atlantic County, of whom 74,565 (35.7%) were registered as Democrats, 57,223 (27.4%) were registered as Republicans and 74,404 (35.6%) were registered as unaffiliated. There were 2,943 (1.4%) voters registered to other parties. Among the county's 2010 Census population, 62.5% were registered to vote, including 76.7% of those ages 18 and over.

Senate Class 1 election results

United States Senate election results for Atlantic County, New Jersey1
Year	Republican		Democratic		Third party(ies)	
Year	No.	%	No.	%	No.	%
2024	60,859	49.79%	58,942	48.22%	2,429	1.99%
2018	45,954	48.85%	44,617	47.43%	3,502	3.72%
2012	42,378	40.12%	61,464	58.19%	1,792	1.70%
2006	31,784	47.05%	34,251	50.71%	1,512	2.24%
2000	39,738	47.49%	42,146	50.37%	1,791	2.14%
1994	25,071	45.18%	29,161	52.55%	1,257	2.27%
1988	33,417	44.61%	41,004	54.73%	493	0.66%
1982	25,606	44.68%	30,801	53.75%	901	1.57%

Senate Class 2 election results

United States Senate election results for Atlantic County, New Jersey2
Year	Republican		Democratic		Third party(ies)	
Year	No.	%	No.	%	No.	%
2020	61,568	45.38%	71,420	52.64%	2,690	1.98%
2014	29,422	46.48%	32,566	51.44%	1,319	2.08%
2013	18,637	48.27%	19,469	50.42%	506	1.31%
2008	45,509	41.87%	61,458	56.54%	1,724	1.59%
2002	27,236	44.07%	33,277	53.85%	1,288	2.08%
1996	33,416	42.84%	41,564	53.28%	3,024	3.88%
1990	19,481	40.54%	27,905	58.08%	662	1.38%
1984	29,447	37.78%	47,478	60.91%	1,020	1.31%

=== State elections ===
Governor election results

Gubernatorial election results for Atlantic County, New Jersey
Year	Republican		Democratic		Third party(ies)	
Year	No.	%	No.	%	No.	%
2025	47,603	47.86%	51,201	51.48%	652	0.66%
2021	44,977	55.32%	35,736	43.95%	595	0.73%
2017	28,456	42.46%	36,952	55.14%	1,607	2.40%
2013	43,975	62.20%	25,557	36.15%	1,166	1.65%
2009	35,724	49.14%	33,360	45.89%	3,611	4.97%
2005	28,004	43.23%	34,539	53.32%	2,238	3.45%
2001	27,547	41.01%	38,623	57.50%	995	1.48%
1997	31,364	47.34%	29,091	43.91%	5,791	8.74%
1993	25,833	39.53%	38,186	58.44%	1,328	2.03%
1989	21,087	34.23%	39,917	64.80%	598	0.97%
1985	38,477	69.08%	16,611	29.82%	608	1.09%
1981	33,466	51.06%	30,716	46.86%	1,362	2.08%
1977	25,020	39.43%	36,790	57.97%	1,652	2.60%
1973	27,547	46.16%	30,513	51.14%	1,611	2.70%
1969	37,662	60.07%	23,004	36.69%	2,030	3.24%
1965	30,455	44.99%	35,245	52.06%	1,999	2.95%
1961	34,766	54.72%	27,254	42.90%	1,510	2.38%
1957	30,841	53.65%	26,223	45.62%	421	0.73%
1953	35,452	64.46%	19,481	35.42%	69	0.13%

== Economy ==
The Bureau of Economic Analysis calculated that the county's gross domestic product was $12.4 billion in 2021, which was ranked 15th in the state and was an 8.8% increase from the prior year.

When Atlantic County was first established in 1837, its sparse population subsided on clams, oysters, and fishing. An early industry was shipbuilding, using the sturdy oak trees of the Pine Barrens. Bog iron furnaces opened in the early 1800s, but declined by the 1850s due to the growth of the Philadelphia iron industry. Around this time, several people and cotton mills opened. The first railroad across the county opened in 1854, intended to assist the bog iron industry; instead, it spurred development in Atlantic City, as well as the growth of farming towns. Farmers began growing grapes, cranberries, and blueberries. The competition dropped the price of travel to 50¢, affordable for Philadelphia's working class. Travelers often brought their lunch in shoe boxes, leading to their nickname "shoobies".

Legalized gambling and the growth of the casino industry employed more than 34,145 people as of 2012.

=== Breweries, distilleries, and wineries ===
In 1864, Louis Nicholas Renault brought property in Egg Harbor City and opened Renault Winery, the oldest active winery in New Jersey, and third-oldest in the United States. During the prohibition era, the winery obtained a government permit to sell wine tonic for medicinal purposes. Tomasello Winery grew its first vineyard in 1888, and opened to the public in 1933. Gross Highland Winery operated in Absecon from 1934 to 1987, when it was sold to developers. Balic Winery opened in 1966 in Mays Landing, although its vineyards date back to the early 19th century. Sylvin Farms Winery opened in 1985 in Egg Harbor City. In 2001, Bellview Winery opened in the Landisville section of Buena. A year later, DiMatteo Vineyards opened in Hammonton, and in 2007, Plagido's Winery opened in the same town.

In 1998, Tun Tavern Brewery opened in Atlantic City across from the Atlantic City Convention Center, named after the original Tun Tavern in Philadelphia, which was the oldest brew house in the country, opening in 1685. In 2015, Tuckahoe Brewing moved from Ocean View to a facility in Egg Harbor Township capable of producing four times the amount of beer. Garden State Beer Company opened in 2016 in Galloway. In 2018, Hidden Sands Brewery opened in Egg Harbor Township.

In 2014, Lazy Eye Distillery opened in Richland in Buena Vista Township. Little Water Distillery opened in Atlantic City in 2016.

== Municipalities ==
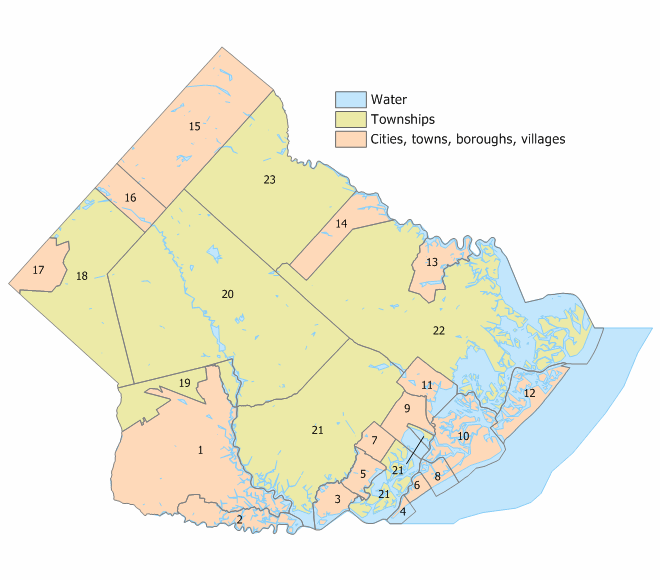
Index map of Atlantic County (click to see index key)

Interactive map of municipalities in Atlantic County.

The 23 municipalities in Atlantic County (with 2010 Census data for population, housing units and area) are:

Municipality (with map key)	Map key	Mun. type	Pop.	Housing units	Total area	Water area	Land area	Pop. density	Housing density	School district	Communities
Absecon	11	City	9,137	3,365	7.29	1.90	5.40	1558.8	623.6	Pleasantville (9–12) (S/R); Absecon (PK-8)	
Atlantic City	10	City	38,497	20,013	17.04	6.29	10.75	3680.8	1862.2	Atlantic City	
Brigantine	12	City	7,716	9,222	10.36	3.98	6.39	1479.5	1443.8	Atlantic City (9–12) (S/R); Brigantine (PK-8)	
Buena	17	Borough	4,501	1,855	7.58	0.00	7.58	607.4	244.8	Buena	Landisville; Minotola
Buena Vista; Township	18	Township	7,033	3,008	41.53	0.47	41.05	184.4	73.3	Buena	Collings Lakes CDP (1,501); East Vineland CDP (925); Milmay CDP (part) (919); Newtonville CDP (742); Richland CDP (623)
Corbin City	2	City	471	212	8.94	1.28	7.67	64.2	27.7	Ocean City (9–12) (S/R); Upper Township (K-8) (S/R)	
Egg Harbor City	14	City	4,396	1,736	11.44	0.51	10.93	388.1	158.8	Greater Egg Harbor (9–12); Egg Harbor City (PK-8)	
Egg Harbor; Township	21	Township	47,842	16,347	74.93	8.34	66.6	650.5	245.5	Egg Harbor Township	Bargaintown CDP (5,360); English Creek CDP (3,364)
Estell Manor	1	City	1,668	673	55.10	1.78	53.32	32.5	12.6	Buena (9–12) (S/R); Estell Manor (K-8)	
Folsom	16	Borough	1,811	717	8.44	0.24	8.2	229.8	87.4	Hammonton (9–12) (S/R); Folsom (PK-8)	Penny Pot
Galloway	22	Township	37,813	14,132	115.21	26.14	89.07	419.3	158.7	Greater Egg Harbor (9–12); Galloway Township (PK-8)	Absecon Highlands CDP (1,414); Cologne CDP (1,461); Germania CDP (297); Leeds Point CDP (205); Oceanville CDP (793); Pomona CDP (7,416); Smithville CDP (7,242); Stockton University CDP (2,428)
Hamilton; Township	20	Township	27,484	10,196	113.07	1.94	111.13	238.5	91.8	Greater Egg Harbor (9–12); Hamilton Township (PK-8)	Mays Landing CDP (5,603); McKee City CDP (9,758); Mizpah CDP (479)
Hammonton	15	Town	14,711	5,715	41.42	0.53	40.89	361.8	139.8	Hammonton	
Linwood	5	City	6,971	2,798	4.24	0.38	3.87	1834.9	723.9	Mainland Regional (9–12); Linwood (PK-8)	
Longport	4	Borough	893	1,656	1.56	1.17	0.39	2323.7	4299.4	Ocean City (9–12) (S/R); Margate (K-8) (S/R)	
Margate City	6	City	5,317	7,114	1.63	0.22	1.42	4490.3	5027.4	Atlantic City (9–12) (S/R); Margate (K-8)	
Mullica; Township	23	Township	5,816	2,360	56.9	0.48	56.42	108.9	41.8	Greater Egg Harbor (9–12); Mullica Township (PK-8)	Elwood CDP (1,215); Nesco CDP (422); Sweetwater CDP (805)
Northfield	7	City	8,434	3,260	3.44	0.04	3.40	2533.7	957.8	Mainland Regional (9–12); Northfield (K-8)	
Pleasantville	9	City	20,629	7,219	7.30	1.60	5.69	3556.5	1267.9	Pleasantville	
Port Republic	13	City	1,101	444	8.58	1.10	7.48	149.0	59.3	Greater Egg Harbor (9–12) (S/R); Port Republic (K-8)	
Somers Point	3	City	10,469	5,556	5.16	1.13	4.03	2678.8	1378.7	Mainland Regional (9–12); Somers Point (PK-8)	
Ventnor City	8	City	9,210	7,829	3.52	1.57	1.95	5457.4	4011.8	Atlantic City (9–12) (S/R); Ventnor (PK-8)	
Weymouth; Township	19	Township	2,614	1,220	12.45	0.36	12.09	224.6	100.9	Buena (9–12) (S/R); Weymouth Township (PK-8)	Dorothy CDP (1,057)

== Education ==
Institutions of higher education in Atlantic County include:

- Atlantic Cape Community College in Mays Landing serves students from both Atlantic and Cape May counties, having been created in 1964 as the state's second county college. Rutgers University offers an off-site program at Atlantic Cape Community College that allows students with an associate degree from an accredited college to earn a bachelor's degree from Rutgers.
- Stockton University, in Galloway Township, was established to provide a four-year college serving the South Jersey area.

School districts include:

- Absecon City School District (listed as K-12, but only has K-8)
- Atlantic City School District
- Brigantine City School District (listed as K-12, but only has K-8)
- Buena Regional School District
- Corbin City School District (non-operating school district)
- Egg Harbor Township School District
- Estell Manor City School District (listed as K-12, but only has K-8)
- Folsom Borough School District (listed as K-12, but only has K-8)
- Hammonton Town School District
- Longport Borough School District (non-operating school district)
- Margate City School District (listed as K-12, but only has K-8)
- Pleasantville City School District
- Port Republic City School District (listed as K-12, but only has K-8)
- Ventnor City School District (listed as K-12, but only has K-8)
- Weymouth Township School District (listed as K-12, but only has K-8)

Secondary:

- Greater Egg Harbor Regional School District
- Mainland Regional School District

Elementary:

- Egg Harbor City School District
- Galloway Township School District
- Hamilton Township School District
- Linwood City School District
- Mullica Township School District
- Northfield City School District
- Somers Point City School District

== Health and police services ==
AtlantiCare is the largest non-casino employer, with a staff of over 5,500 people over five counties, established in 1993 by the Atlantic City Medical Center Board of Governors. Atlantic City Hospital opened in 1898, becoming Atlantic City Medical Center in 1973. Two years later, the hospital built its Mainland Division in Pomona. AtlantiCare has also opened four urgent care centers. In 1928, Dr. Charles Ernst and Dr. Frank Inksetter built Atlantic Shores Hospital and Sanitarium in Somers Point as a private institute for the treatment of alcohol and drug dependency. In 1940, citizens turned the facility into the not-for-profit Shore Medical Center, which has expanded over time to add more beds and units.

In 1840, the first county jail opened in Mays Landing, designed by Thomas Ustick Walter, who also designed the U.S. Capital building. This facility was replaced by newer facilities in 1932, 1962, and the current Gerard L. Gormley Justice Facility in 1985, which can hold 1,000 inmates. The facility has been controlled by the Atlantic County Department of Public Safety since 1987.

== Parks and recreation ==
=== National protected areas ===
- Edwin B. Forsythe National Wildlife Refuge covers 47,000 acres (19,000 ha) of coastal habitat in Atlantic and Ocean counties.
- Great Egg Harbor Scenic and Recreational River runs from Camden County to Great Egg Harbor.

== Transportation ==
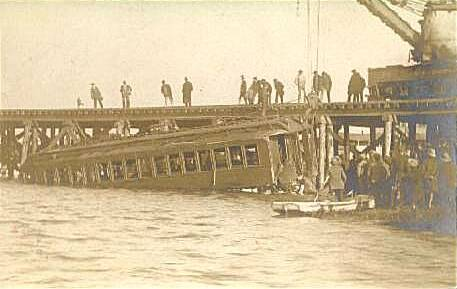
1906 Atlantic City train wreck recovery

The indigenous people of New Jersey developed a series of trails across the state, including one from current-day Absecon to Camden. Early transportation relied on the region's waterways. An early coastal road was constructed in 1716 from Somers Point to Nacote Creek in Port Republic. Roads into the county's interior were slow, unreliable, and muddy, with one main roadway along the Mullica River that eventually connected to Burlington. Roads later connected the region's industries in the 19th century, until the county's first railroad opened in 1854, which brought more people to the region. By 1870, the Camden and Atlantic Railroad Company carried 417,000 people each year. Also in that year, the Pleasantville and Atlantic Turnpike opened, crossing Beach Thorofare into Atlantic City. A railroad competitor, the Philadelphia and Atlantic City Railway, opened in 1877 after only 90 days of construction. Other rail lines connected farms and cities throughout the county by the end of the 19th century. A notable railroad tragedy occurred on October 28, 1906, when three train cars derailed on a draw bridge into 30 ft (9.1 m) deep water in Beach Thorofare, killing 53 people, with only two survivors. Improved roads reduced the reliance on railroads by the 1950s.

In the late 1800s, a bridge opened in Mays Landing, providing road access to the county's interior. The first car in Atlantic City was seen in 1899. By the 1890s, visitors began riding bicycles in the coastal resort towns, and thousands of people would ride from Camden to the coast on weekends. Amid pressure from motorists and cyclists, the county improved the conditions of the roads in the early 20th century. The first road bridge to Atlantic City opened in 1905, using Albany Avenue on what is now US 40/US 322. In 1916, the causeway that is now New Jersey Route 152 opened between Somers Point and Longport. In 1919, the White Horse Pike (US 30) was completed from Atlantic City to Camden, and repaved through the county in 1925. Also in 1922, the Harding Highway (US 40) opened from Pennsville Township to Atlantic City, named after then-President Warren G. Harding. In 1928, the Beesley's Point Bridge opened, replacing the ferry between Somers Point and Cape May County. The Black Horse Pike (US 322) opened in 1935, connecting Atlantic City to Camden. Most of the county's older bridges were replaced over time; formerly the oldest still in existence was a swing bridge from 1904 that crosses Nacote Creek in Port Republic, but work on that bridge's replacement began in summer of 2021. The Great Egg Harbor Bridge opened in 1956, marking the completion of the Garden State Parkway, which connected Cape May and Atlantic counties, continuing to North Jersey. In 1964, the Atlantic City Expressway opened between the Parkway and Camden County, and a year later was extended into Atlantic City. In 2001, the Atlantic City–Brigantine Connector was built, connecting the Expressway with Atlantic City's marina district.

As early as 1990, the South Jersey Transportation Authority had plans to construct an Atlantic County Beltway as a limited-access road, beginning along Ocean Heights Avenue in southern Egg Harbor Township at a proposed Exit 32 with the Garden State Parkway. The proposed road would pass west of the Atlantic City Airport and reconnect with the Parkway at Exit 44 via County Route 575 in Galloway Township. The routing was later truncated from U.S. 40 (the Black Horse Pike) to Exit 44 on the Parkway. The project was considered "desirable" but was not funded.

=== Roads and highways ===
As of 2017, the county had a total of 1,984 miles (3,193 km) of public roadways, of which 1,395 mi (2,245 km) were maintained by the local municipality, 373 mi (600 km) by the county, 144 mi (232 km) by the NJ Department of Transportation, and 58 mi (93 km) by either the New Jersey Turnpike Authority or South Jersey Transportation Authority. State and local park services are responsible for 7 miles (11 km) of roadway, while 8 mi (13 km) fall under federal jurisdiction (either military, National Park Service, or other federal agency).

==== Major highways ====
Major roadways include:

- Garden State Parkway (with 21.5 miles (34.6 km) in the county)
- Atlantic City Expressway (29.6 miles (47.6 km))
- U.S. Route 9
- U.S. Route 30
- U.S. Route 40
- U.S. Route 206
- U.S. Route 322
- Route 49
- Route 50
- Route 52
- Route 54
- Route 87
- Route 152

=== Public transportation ===
NJ Transit's Atlantic City Line connects the Atlantic City Rail Terminal in Atlantic City with the 30th Street Station in Philadelphia, with service at intermediate stations at Hammonton, Egg Harbor City and Absecon in the county.

== See also ==
- National Register of Historic Places listings in Atlantic County, New Jersey
