= Buena Regional High School =

High school in Atlantic County, New Jersey, US

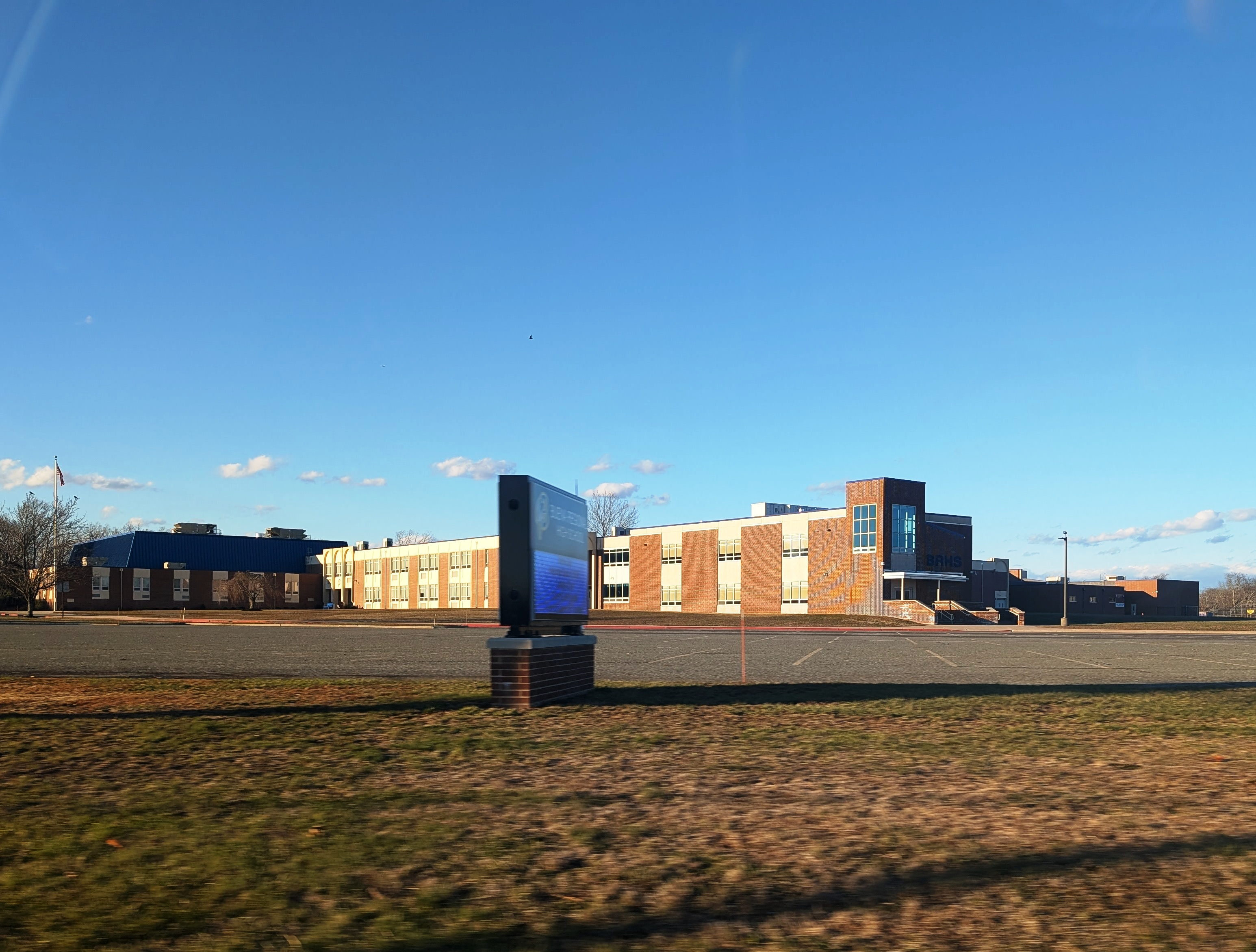

Location
- 125 Weymouth Road; Buena, Atlantic County, New Jersey 08310; United States; 39.535175°N 74.91838°W

Information
- Type: Public high school
- Established: 1971
- School district: Buena Regional School District
- NCES School ID: 340240000044
- Principal: Karen Cavalieri
- Faculty: 45.1 FTEs
- Grades: 9-12
- Enrollment: 491 (as of 2024–25)
- Student to teacher ratio: 10.9:1
- Colors: Blue and gold
- Athletics conference: Cape-Atlantic League
- Team name: Chiefs
- Website: brhs.buenaschools.org

Buena Regional High School is a comprehensive regional public high school serving students in ninth through twelfth grades from communities in Atlantic County, in the U.S. state of New Jersey, operating as the lone secondary school of the Buena Regional School District. Municipalities served by the district are Buena Borough and Buena Vista Township. The school opened in September 1971.

Students from both Estell Manor and Weymouth Township, attend Buena Regional High School as part of sending/receiving relationships with the respective school districts.

As of the 2024–25 school year, the school had an enrollment of 491 students and 45.1 classroom teachers (on an FTE basis), for a student–teacher ratio of 10.9:1. There were 224 students (45.6% of enrollment) eligible for free lunch and 55 (11.2% of students) eligible for reduced-cost lunch.

== History ==
More than 350 students from the Buena Regional district had attended Vineland High School for grades 10–12 as part of a sending/receiving relationship. In March 1970, the Buena Regional School District went ahead with pursuing construction of its own high school after receiving notice from the Vineland Public Schools that it had "phased out" on receiving students at its high school due to rising enrollment of Vineland resident students.

Ground was broken in October 1971 for a new high school building on an 84-acre (34 ha) site that would accommodate up to 1,200 students and be constructed at a cost of $4.5 million (equivalent to $35.8 million in 2025). When the school opened for the 1972–1973 school year, enrollment was expected to include 700 students from Buena and Buena Vista Township, along with 200 students from Estell Manor and Weymouth Township.

An addition completed in 1999 added six new classrooms and two new science labs.

Students from Newfield, a non-operating school district, had attended the district's high school until the 2010–11 school year, after the New Jersey Department of Education approved a plan in 2009 under which students from Newfield would start attending Delsea Regional High School, with those still at Buena attending until they graduate.

== Awards, recognition and rankings ==
The school was the 296th-ranked public high school in New Jersey out of 339 schools statewide in New Jersey Monthly magazine's September 2014 cover story on the state's "Top Public High Schools", using a new ranking methodology. The school had been ranked 316th in the state of 328 schools in 2012, after being ranked 297th in 2010 out of 322 schools listed. The magazine ranked the school 286th in 2008 out of 316 schools. The school was ranked 289th in the magazine's September 2006 issue, which surveyed 316 schools across the state.

== Curriculum ==
The curriculum offerings include Advanced Placement (AP) courses in AP Calculus, AP United States History, AP English Literature and Composition, AP European History, AP Biology, AP Statistics, AP Psychology and AP Chemistry.

== Athletics ==
The Buena Regional High School Chiefs compete in the National Division of the Cape-Atlantic League an athletic conference comprised of both public and private high schools in Atlantic, Cape May, Cumberland and Gloucester counties, and operates under the aegis of the New Jersey State Interscholastic Athletic Association (NJSIAA). With 374 students in grades 10–12, the school was classified by the NJSIAA for the 2022–24 school years as Group I South for most athletic competition purposes. The football team competes in the Patriot Division of the 94-team West Jersey Football League superconference and was classified by the NJSIAA as Group I South for football for 2024–2026, which included schools with 185 to 482 students.

Buena Regional High School's athletic department offers interscholastic programs in boys and girls basketball, tennis, and soccer, as well as baseball and softball, girls' field hockey, boys' wrestling, boys and girls spring and winter track, cross country and football. There are cheerleading squads for Varsity and Junior Varsity basketball and football. The baseball team has won or shared 15 league, conference, or division titles in 34 years. The baseball team won a South Jersey Group II State title in 2008 under Coach George West. A co-ed swim team was formed for the 2008–09 season. The girls cross country team under Michael Falciani has won two consecutive Atlantic County championships, and has been undefeated for four years in their conference.

The 1988 football team finished the season with an 11–0 record after winning the South Jersey Group II state title by defeating Salem High School by a score of 21–0 in the championship game. The team made it to the state championship game in 2002, only to lose to West Deptford High School in overtime by a score of 21–20 on a controversial goal-line stand on a two-point conversion that was stopped inches from the goal line in a game described by sportswriter Phil Anastasia as what "might be the greatest ending to a football game I ever saw."

The boys' cross country team won the Group II title, the school's first state championship, in 1988.

The wrestling team won the South Jersey Group II state sectional title in 1994, 1995, 2003-2005 and 2015. Sophomore Shea Aretz became the school's first individual champion, when she won in the 132 pounds (60 kg) weight class.

The girls track team won the indoor relay championship in Group II in 1998. The team won the indoor state championship in Group II in 1999. The girls spring track team was the Group II state champion in 2011.

The boys track team won the spring / outdoor track state championship in Group II in 2000.

The baseball team became the first title-winning team from the Cape Atlantic League when it won the Group II state championship in 2014, with a 4–1 win in the tournament final against Bernards High School. The team won the 2023 South Jersey Group I sectional title, with an 8–4 win over Audubon High School.

== Arts ==
The band and choir of Buena Regional have competed extensively throughout the years, with the choir winning a Grand Championship in a national competition in 1992.

The marching band has won awards in percussion and auxiliary. They won "Most Improved" at the Cavalcade Championships in Hershey, Pennsylvania.

== Administration ==
The school's principal is Karen Cavalieri. The core administration team includes the vice principal.

== Notable alumni ==
- Olivia Lux, drag performer most known for competing on season 13 of RuPaul's Drag Race and season 10 of RuPaul's Drag Race All Stars
