= Egg Harbor Township Schools =

School district in Atlantic County, New Jersey, US

Address
- 13 Swift Drive Egg Harbor Township, Atlantic County, New Jersey, 08234; United States
- Coordinates: 39.385149°N 74.507463°W

District information
- Grades: pre-K to 12
- Superintendent: Kimberly Gruccio
- Business administrator: Daniel Smith
- Schools: 7

Students and staff
- Enrollment: 7,473 (as of 2023–24)
- Faculty: 684.4 FTEs
- Student–teacher ratio: 10.9:1

Other information
- District Factor Group: CD
- Website: www.eht.k12.nj.us
Ind.	Per pupil	District spending	Rank (*)	K-12 average	%± vs. average
1A	Total Spending	$17,481	36	$18,891	−7.5%
1	Budgetary Cost	12,964	24	14,783	−12.3%
2	Classroom Instruction	7,818	16	8,763	−10.8%
6	Support Services	2,251	49	2,392	−5.9%
8	Administrative Cost	1,096	7	1,485	−26.2%
10	Operations & Maintenance	1,514	38	1,783	−15.1%
13	Extracurricular Activities	151	15	268	−43.7%
16	Median Teacher Salary	59,829	29	64,043
Data from NJDoE 2014 Taxpayers' Guide to Education Spending. *Of K-12 districts with more than 3,500 students. Lowest spending=1; Highest=103

The Egg Harbor Township Schools is a comprehensive community public school district that serves students in pre-kindergarten through twelfth grade from Egg Harbor Township in Atlantic County, in the U.S. state of New Jersey.

As of the 2023–24 school year, the district, comprised of seven schools, had an enrollment of 7,473 students and 684.4 classroom teachers (on an FTE basis), for a student–teacher ratio of 10.9:1.

== History ==
The community in the 1880s established a school for black children in 1884. Some African-Americans had objected to a separate school and wanted to send their children to the school for white children. A report for the 1884-1885 school year stated that opposition to the school subsided.

Enrollment peaked in the 2010–11 school year, when the district had 7,864 students. Enrollment decreased afterward due to a decline in casino jobs. Between 2010-2011 and 2014 its enrollment declined by 3%. In 2010 alone, the proposed budget called for 70 jobs to be cut. In 2016, the district had more than 7,500 students, giving it one of the largest enrollments among school districts in Atlantic County.

The district had been classified by the New Jersey Department of Education as being in District Factor Group "CD", the sixth-highest of eight groupings. District Factor Groups organize districts statewide to allow comparison by common socioeconomic characteristics of the local districts. From lowest socioeconomic status to highest, the categories are A, B, CD, DE, FG, GH, I and J.

== Schools ==
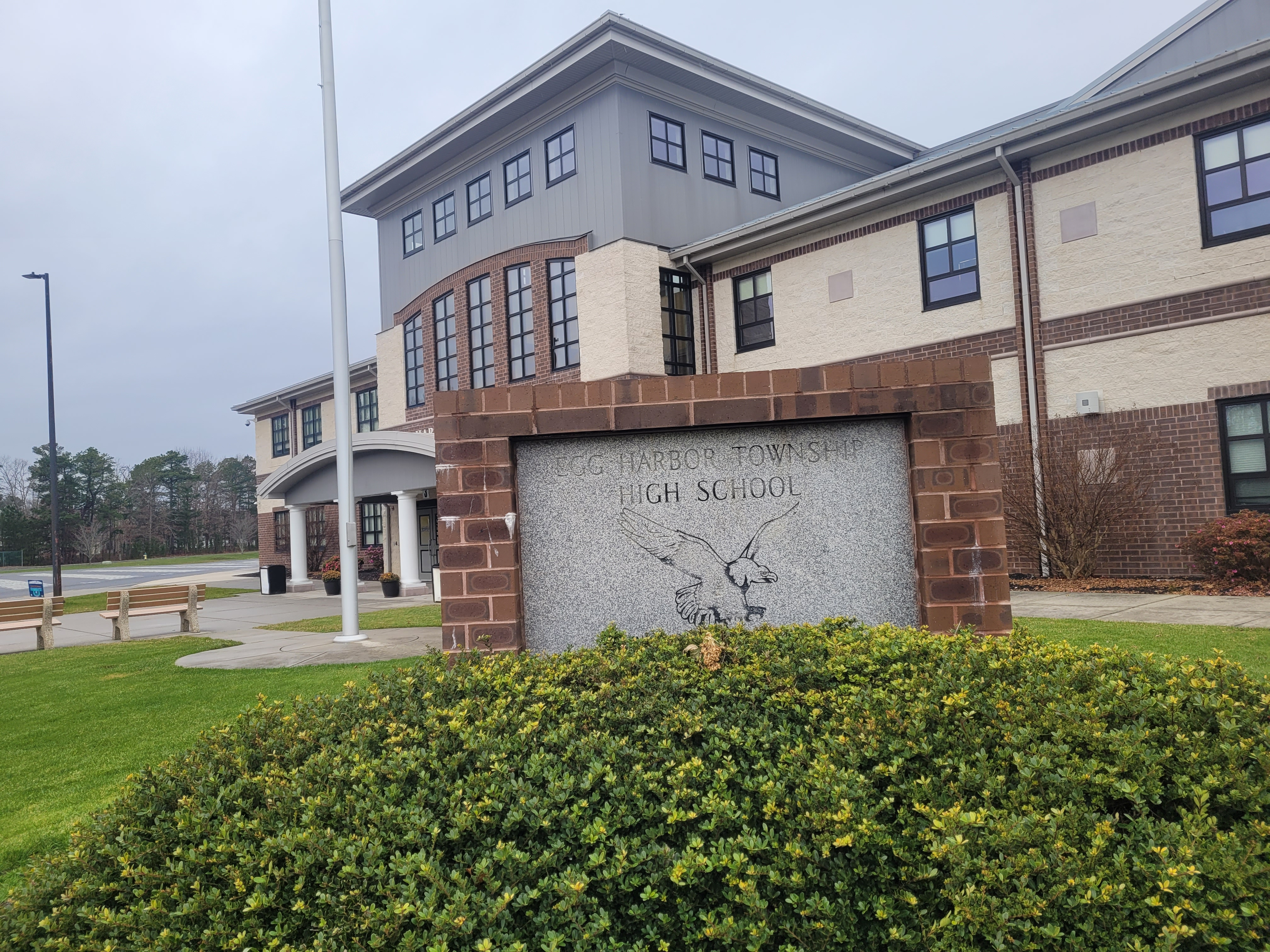
Egg Harbor Township High School, sign near entrance

Schools in the district (with 2023–24 enrollment data from the National Center for Education Statistics) are:

Preschool

- Bargaintown Preschool had 165 students in PreK

Elementary schools

- Davenport School Complex with 734 students in grades K–3
  - Latiya White, principal
- Swift-Slaybaugh School Complex with 1,414 students in grades PreK–3
  - Rachel Casumpang, principal
- Dr. Joyanne D. Miller Elementary School with 1,038 students in grade 4–5
  - James Battersby, principal

Middle schools

- Alder Avenue Middle School with 926 students in grade 6–8
  - Tatiana Cunningham, principal
- Fernwood Avenue Middle School with 798 students in grade 6–8
  - Frank Locantora, principal

High school

- Egg Harbor Township High School with 2,299 students in grade 9–12
  - Jacki Carugno, principal

== Administration ==
Core members of the district's administration are:

- Kimberly Gruccio, superintendent
- Daniel Smith, business administrator and board secretary

== Board of education ==
The district's board of education, comprised of nine members, sets policy and oversees the fiscal and educational operation of the district through its administration. As a Type II school district, the board's trustees are elected directly by voters to serve three-year terms of office on a staggered basis, with three seats up for election each year held (since 2012) as part of the November general election. The board appoints a superintendent to oversee the district's day-to-day operations and a business administrator to supervise the business functions of the district.
