= Atlantic City School District =

School district in Atlantic County, New Jersey, US

Address
- 1300 Atlantic Avenue Atlantic City, Atlantic County, New Jersey, 08401; United States
- Coordinates: 39.362558°N 74.426895°W

District information
- Grades: Pre-K-12
- Superintendent: La'Quetta Small
- Business administrator: Celeste Ricketts
- Schools: 11

Students and staff
- Enrollment: 6,553 (as of 2020–21)
- Faculty: 617.3 FTEs
- Student–teacher ratio: 10.6:1

Other information
- District Factor Group: A
- Website: www.acboe.org
Ind.	Per pupil	District spending	Rank (*)	K-12 average	%± vs. average
1A	Total Spending	$25,676	103	$18,891	35.9%
1	Budgetary Cost	20,728	102	14,783	40.2%
2	Classroom Instruction	12,559	103	8,763	43.3%
6	Support Services	3,001	91	2,392	25.5%
8	Administrative Cost	1,666	84	1,485	12.2%
10	Operations & Maintenance	3,172	101	1,783	77.9%
13	Extracurricular Activities	227	44	268	−15.3%
16	Median Teacher Salary	76,230	92	64,043
Data from NJDoE 2014 Taxpayers' Guide to Education Spending. *Of K-12 districts with more than 3,500 students. Lowest spending=1; Highest=103

Atlantic City School District is a comprehensive community public school district in Atlantic City, in Atlantic County, in the U.S. state of New Jersey. The district serves students in pre-kindergarten through twelfth grade.

As of the 2020–21 school year, the district, comprising 11 schools, had an enrollment of 6,553 students and 617.3 classroom teachers (on an FTE basis), for a student–teacher ratio of 10.6:1.

Students from Brigantine, Longport, Margate City and Ventnor City attend Atlantic City High School as part of sending/receiving relationships with the respective school districts.

The district had been classified by the New Jersey Department of Education as being in District Factor Group "A", the lowest of eight groupings. District Factor Groups organize districts statewide to allow comparison by common socioeconomic characteristics of the local districts. From lowest socioeconomic status to highest, the categories are A, B, CD, DE, FG, GH, I and J.

The district participates in the Interdistrict Public School Choice Program, which allows non-resident students to attend the district's school without cost to their parents, with tuition covered by the State of New Jersey. Available slots are announced annually by grade.

== History ==
In 1948, students had choices to attend schools. That year Noma Jensen of the Journal of Negro Education stated the district had "loose boundary lines". In 1948, there were three schools earmarked to African-Americans with all of the teachers being African-American, and there was one African-American teacher at Atlantic City High School. This was in an era of de jure educational segregation in the United States.

Starting in 2014, the dissolution of some charter schools was a factor in an increase in the student population, despite a decline in casino jobs.

Former schools

- Atlantic City High School East Campus (closing announced December 2014), 117 Indiana Ave.
- New Jersey Avenue School, (formerly segregated) 18 N. New Jersey Ave.

== Schools ==
Schools in the district (with 2020–21 enrollment data from the National Center for Education Statistics) are:

Preschool

- Venice Park School (36 students in PreK)
  - Jodi Burroughs, principal

Elementary schools

- Brighton Avenue School (315 students; in grades PreK-5)
  - Dorothy Bullock-Fernandes, principal
- Chelsea Heights School (332; PreK-8)
  - James E. Knox, principal
- Dr. Martin Luther King Jr. School Complex (543; PreK-8)
  - Jodi Burroughs, principal
- New York Avenue School (548; PreK-8)
  - Kendall Williams, principal
- Pennsylvania Avenue School (549; PreK-8)
  - Kenneth M. Flood, principal
- Richmond Avenue School (615; PreK-8)
  - Shelley Williams, principal
- Sovereign Avenue School (696; PreK-8)
  - Nicole Williams, principal
- Texas Avenue School (499; K-8)
  - Lina Gil, principal
- Uptown School Complex (536; PreK-8)
  - Ananda M. Davis-Wright, principal

High school

- Atlantic City High School (1,771; 9-12)
  - Constance Days-Chapman, principal

Pennsylvania Avenue School opened for the 2012-13 school year, with most students shifting from New Jersey Avenue School, which had been one of the district's oldest and most rundown schools.

== Administration ==
Core members of the district's administration are:

- La'Quetta Small, superintendent
- Celeste Ricketts, business administrator
- Angela Brown, board secretary

== Board of education ==
The district's board of education is comprised of nine members who set policy and oversee the fiscal and educational operation of the district through its administration. As a Type II school district, the board's trustees are elected directly by voters to serve three-year terms of office on a staggered basis, with three seats up for election each year held (since 2013) as part of the November general election. The board appoints a superintendent to oversee the district's day-to-day operations and a business administrator to supervise the business functions of the district.
