= Buena Regional School District =

School district in Atlantic County, New Jersey, US

Address
- 914 Main Avenue Richland, Atlantic County, New Jersey, 08350; United States
- Coordinates: 39.50213°N 74.896921°W

District information
- Grades: Pre-K to 12
- Superintendent: David Cappuccio Jr.
- Business administrator: Pasquale Yacovelli
- Schools: 5

Students and staff
- Enrollment: 1,691 (as of 2020–21)
- Faculty: 150.0 FTEs
- Student–teacher ratio: 11.3:1

Other information
- District Factor Group: A
- Website: www.buenaschools.org
Ind.	Per pupil	District spending	Rank (*)	K-12 average	%± vs. average
1A	Total Spending	$19,128	51	$18,891	1.3%
1	Budgetary Cost	13,750	36	14,783	−7.0%
2	Classroom Instruction	8,004	29	8,763	−8.7%
6	Support Services	2,372	51	2,392	−0.8%
8	Administrative Cost	1,491	31	1,485	0.4%
10	Operations & Maintenance	1,515	27	1,783	−15.0%
13	Extracurricular Activities	358	26	268	33.6%
16	Median Teacher Salary	64,296	40	64,043
Data from NJDoE 2014 Taxpayers' Guide to Education Spending. *Of K-12 districts with 1,800-3,500 students. Lowest spending=1; Highest=68

The Buena Regional School District is a comprehensive regional public school district serving students in pre-kindergarten through twelfth grade from Buena Borough and Buena Vista Township, two municipalities in Atlantic County, in the U.S. state of New Jersey. Students are sent to the district's high school for grades 9 - 12 from both Estell Manor City and Weymouth Township as part of sending/receiving relationships with the respective school districts.

As of the 2020–21 school year, the district, comprising five schools, had an enrollment of 1,691 students and 150.0 classroom teachers (on an FTE basis), for a student–teacher ratio of 11.3:1.

The district is classified by the New Jersey Department of Education as being in District Factor Group "A", the lowest of eight groupings. District Factor Groups organize districts statewide to allow comparison by common socioeconomic characteristics of the local districts. From lowest socioeconomic status to highest, the categories are A, B, CD, DE, FG, GH, I and J.

== History ==
In June 2009, the New Jersey Department of Education ruled that Newfield, a non-operating district seeking to cut costs for its tuition students, could end its relationship with the Buena Regional School District and as of the 2011–12 school year could start sending incoming high school students in grades 7–9 to Delsea Regional High School, under a transition in which students at Buena's high school would remain in the district until they graduated.

== Schools ==
Schools in the district (with 2020–21 enrollment data from the National Center for Education Statistics) are:

Elementary schools

- Collings Lakes Elementary School with 197 students in grades K-2
  - Richard A. Lawrence, principal
- John C. Milanesi Elementary School with 259 students in grades PreK-2
  - Moses White, principal
- Dr. J.P. Cleary Elementary School with 309 students in grades 3-5
  - Leonard Long, principal

Middle school

- Buena Regional Middle School with 336 students in grades 6-8
  - Karen Cavalieri, principal

High school

- Buena Regional High School with 535 students in grades 9-12
  - Christina Collazo-Franco, principal

== Administration ==
Core members of the district's administration are:

- David Cappuccio Jr., superintendent
- Pasquale Yacovelli, business administrator and board secretary

== Board of education ==
The district's board of education is comprised of nine members who set policy and oversee the fiscal and educational operation of the district through its administration. As a Type II school district, the board's trustees are elected directly by voters to serve three-year terms of office on a staggered basis, with three seats up for election each year held (since 2012) as part of the November general election. The board appoints a superintendent to oversee the district's day-to-day operations and a business administrator to supervise the business functions of the district. Seats on the board of education are allocated based on population, with six assigned to Buena Vista Township and three to Buena Borough.
