= List of United States post offices in New Jersey =

United States post offices operate under the authority of the United States Post Office Department (1792–1971) or the United States Postal Service (since 1971). Historically, post offices were usually placed in a prominent location. Many were architecturally distinctive, including notable buildings featuring Beaux-Arts, Art Deco, and Vernacular architecture. However, modern U.S. post offices were generally designed for functionality rather than architectural style.

Following is a list of United States post offices in New Jersey. Notable post offices include individual buildings, whether still in service or not, which have architectural, historical, or community-related significance. Many of these are listed on the National Register of Historic Places (NRHP) or state and local historic registers.

Post office	City	Date built	Image	Architect	Notes	Ref.
United States Post Office (Atlantic City, New Jersey)	Atlantic City	1935–1937		Christian H. Ziegler, Howard A. Stout	(Note: Building was demolished.) (Note: Houses the New Deal murals Family Recreations and Youth by Peppino Mangravite, since relocated to the new post office.)	
Belcoville Post Office	Belcoville	1918		Vivian B. Smith	(Note: Listed on the National Register of Historic Places.)	
United States Post Office (Belmar, New Jersey)	Belmar	1936				
United States Post Office (Bergenfield, New Jersey)	Bergenfield	1935				
United States Post Office (Bloomfield, New Jersey)	Bloomfield	1934				
United States Post Office (Bordentown, New Jersey)	Bordentown	1939			(Note: Housed the New Deal mural Skating on Bonaparte’s Pond by Avery Johnson.)	
United States Post Office (Bound Brook, New Jersey)	Bound Brook	1935				
United States Post Office (Caldwell, New Jersey)	Caldwell	1933			(Note: Housed the New Deal mural Sorting the Mail by Brenda Putnam.)	
United States Post Office and Courthouse (Camden, New Jersey)	Camden	1932		James A. Wetmore		
United States Post Office (Cape May, New Jersey)	Cape May	1938				
United States Post Office (Cliffside Park, New Jersey)	Cliffside Park	1935			(Note: Houses the New Deal plaster relief Rural Delivery by Bruno Neri, which is currently missing or was destroyed.)	
United States Post Office (Cranford, New Jersey)	Cranford	1935–1936		Louis A. Simon, Neal A. Melick, Wesley Sherwood Bessell	(Note: Houses a series of New Deal murals, The Battle of Cranford during the American Revolution by Gerald Foster.)	
United States Post Office (Dover, New Jersey)	Dover	1934				
United States Post Office (Edgewater, New Jersey)	Edgewater	1937				
United States Post Office (Englewood, New Jersey)	Englewood	1936				
United States Post Office (Flemington, New Jersey)	Flemington	1941				
United States Post Office (Fort Lee, New Jersey)	Fort Lee	1938–1939		Louis A. Simon, Neal A. Melick		
United States Post Office (Freehold, New Jersey), now Monmouth County Veterans Memorial Building and Monmouth County Sheriff's Office.	Freehold	1934			(Note: No longer used as a post office.) (Note: Originally housed a New Deal mural by Gerald Foster, now in the Monmouth County Public Library.)	
United States Post Office (Garfield, New Jersey)	Garfield	1936			(Note: Houses the New Deal sculpture Transportation of the Mail by Robert Laurent.)	
United States Post Office (Glen Ridge, New Jersey)	Glen Ridge	1936–1937		Louis A. Simon, Neal A. Melick	(Note: Houses the New Deal mural Glen Ridge by James Chapin.)	
United States Post Office (Gloucester City, New Jersey)	Gloucester City	1935			(Note: Houses the New Deal mural The Perils of the Mail by Vincent D’Agostino.)	
United States Post Office (Hackettstown, New Jersey)	Hackettstown	1935				
United States Post Office (Haddon Heights, New Jersey)	Haddon Heights	1937		Louis A. Simon, Neal A. Melick	(Note: Houses the New Deal artwork The Letter, a cast stone relief sculpture by Isamu Noguchi.)	
United States Post Office (Haddonfield, New Jersey)	Haddonfield	1935				
United States Post Office (Hammonton, New Jersey)	Hammonton	1938		Louis A. Simon, Neal A. Melick	(Note: Originally housed the New Deal sculpture Harvest by Spero Anageros, which is now missing.)	
United States Post Office (Hawthorne, New Jersey)	Hawthorne	1941		Louis A. Simon, Neal A. Melick	(Note: Houses the New Deal wood relief Postman and Hawthorne Bush by Ilse Erythropel.)	
United States Post Office (Hightstown, New Jersey)	Hightstown	1936		Louis A. Simon, Neal A. Melick		
United States Post Office (Harrison, New Jersey)	Harrison	1938–1939		Louis A. Simon, Neal A. Melick, Alan Balch Mills	(Note: Houses a New Deal plaster relief, Industry and the Family by Murray J. Roper.)	
United States Post Office (Kearny, New Jersey)	Kearny	1936			(Note: Houses two New Deal murals, The City and The Marsh by Albert Kotin.)	
United States Post Office (Lakewood, New Jersey)	Lakewood	1938				
United States Post Office (Linden, New Jersey)	Linden	1938		Louis A. Simon, Neal A. Melick, R. Stanley-Brown	(Note: Houses the New Deal artwork, Industry a terra cotta relief by Sahl Swarz.)	
United States Post Office, now Little Falls Civic Center and Historical Society	Little Falls	1938		Louis A. Simon, Neal A. Melick	(Note: Houses the New Deal mural Labor and Leisure by James Brooks.)	
United States Post Office (Madison, New Jersey)	Madison	1935				
United States Post Office (Matawan, New Jersey)	Matawan	1937		Louis A. Simon, Neal A. Melick	(Note: Houses four New Deal plaster reliefs by Armin A. Scheler: Philip Freneau Freeing the Slaves, Rural Mill, Old Hospital. Old Glenwood Institute, and First Presbyterian Church, 1767.)	
United States Post Office (Metuchen, New Jersey)	Metuchen	1940		Louis A. Simon, Neal A. Melick	(Note: Houses the New Deal plaster relief Gardeners by Harold Ambellan.)	
United States Post Office (Millburn, New Jersey)	Millburn	1939			(Note: Originally housed the New Deal mural Revolutionary Engagement at Bridge in Millburn–1780 by Gerald Foster, since destroyed.)	
Post Office Building, Upper Montclair	Montclair	1918		Francis A. Nelson		
United States Post Office (Moorestown, New Jersey)	Moorestown	1935				
New Brunswick Main Post Office	New Brunswick	1934–1936		Wesley Sherwood Bessell	(Note: Houses three New Deal murals by George Biddle: George Washington with De Witt, Geographer of the Revolutionary Army, Washington Retreating from New Brunswick, and Howe and Cornwallis Entering New Brunswick.)	
Frank R. Lautenberg Post Office and Courthouse	Newark	1933		George Oakley Totten Jr., William E. Lehman, James A. Wetmore		
United States Post Office (North Bergen, New Jersey)	North Bergen	1939		Louis A. Simon, Neal A. Melick	(Note: Houses the New Deal mural Purchase of Territory of North Bergen from the Indians by Avery Johnson.)	
United States Post Office (Nutley, New Jersey)	Nutley	1939		Louis A. Simon, Neal A. Melick	(Note: Houses the New Deal mural Return of Annie Oakley by Paul C. Chapman.)	
United States Post Office (Ocean City, New Jersey)	Ocean City	1936		Louis A. Simon, Neal A. Melick, William Dewey Foster		
United States Customs House and Post Office, later Passaic County Courthouse Annex	Paterson	1898–1903		Fred Wesley Wentworth	(Note: Part of the Passaic County Court House and United States Custom House and Post Office Historic District.)	
United States Post Office (Paulsboro, New Jersey)	Paulsboro	1939			(Note: Houses the New Deal artwork Oil Refining, three painted wood carvings by Nena de Brennecke.)	
United States Post Office (Penns Grove, New Jersey)	Penns Grove	1940			(Note: Houses the New Deal bas relief Early Traders by Benjamin Hawkins.)	
United States Post Office (Perth Amboy, New Jersey)	Perth Amboy	1937				
United States Post Office (Phillipsburg, New Jersey)	Phillipsburg	1933		James A. Wetmore, Frank R. Hahn, Hopkins and Dentz		
United States Post Office (Pitman, New Jersey)	Pitman	1937			(Note: Houses the New Deal plaster relief Four Winds by Nathaniel Choate.)	
United States Post Office (Plainfield, New Jersey)	Plainfield	1941			(Note: Houses two New Deal tempera murals by Anton Refregier Folklore of America and Quilting Bee.)	
United States Post Office (Pompton Lakes, New Jersey)	Pompton Lakes	1937		Louis A. Simon, Neal A. Melick	(Note: Houses the New Deal mural Benjamin Franklin by A. Stirling Calder.)	
Palmer Square Post Office	Princeton	1934			(Note: Houses the New Deal mural Columbia under the Palm by Karl Free.)	
United States Post Office (Rahway, New Jersey), now Rahway Senior Citizens Center	Rahway	1937				
United States Post Office (Ridgefield Park, New Jersey)	Ridgefield Park	1937			(Note: Houses the New Deal mural Washington Bridge by Thomas Donnelly.)	
United States Post Office (Ridgewood, New Jersey)	Ridgewood	1937		Louis A. Simon, Neal A. Melick, R. Stanley-Brown	(Note: Houses two New Deal metal reliefs by Romuald Kraus.)	
United States Post Office (Riverside, New Jersey)	Riverside	1937–1938		Louis A. Simon, Neal A. Melick	(Note: Houses the New Deal mural The Town of Progress – 1855 by John Poehler.)	
United States Post Office (Riverton, New Jersey)	Riverton	1939		Louis A. Simon, Neal A. Melick		
United States Post Office (Rutherford, New Jersey)	Rutherford	1936		Edgar Irving Williams		
United States Post Office (Short Hills, New Jersey)	Short Hills	1939			(Note: Originally housed the New Deal mural Short Hills Landscape by Ernest Lawson, now destroyed.)	
United States Post Office (South Orange, New Jersey)	South Orange	1936–1938		Louis A. Simon, Neal A. Melick	(Note: Houses the New Deal mural Outdoor Activities of South Orange by Bernard Perlin.)	
United States Post Office (South River, New Jersey)	South River	1940–1942		Louis A. Simon, Neal A. Melick	(Note: Houses the New Deal artwork Construction, a wood carving by Maurice Glickman.)	
United States Post Office (Summit, New Jersey)	Summit	1937			(Note: Originally house two New Deal murals Arrival of First Train and Stage Coach Attack by Fiske Boyd, now destroyed.)	
United States Post Office (Toms River, New Jersey)	Toms River	1939		Louis A. Simon, Neal A. Melick	(Note: Originally housed the New Deal sculpture Boating on Barnegat Bay by Milton Hebald, which is now missing.)	
U.S. Post Office and Courthouse, now Clarkson S. Fisher Federal Building and United States Courthouse	Trenton	1931–1932		James A. Wetmore		
United States Post Office (Union City, New Jersey)	Union City	1939				
United States Post Office (Washington, New Jersey)	Washington	1939		Louis A. Simon, Neal A. Melick	(Note: Houses the New Deal mural A Raising in Early New Jersey by Frank Shapiro.)	
United States Post Office (West New York, New Jersey)	West New York	1937–1939		Louis A. Simon, Neal A. Melick, Paul Peter Cayot, Bowden Russell & Garland	(Note: Houses the New Deal mural View From the Palisades – West New York 1939 by William Dean Fausett.)	
United States Post Office (Westfield, New Jersey)	Westfield	1937–1938		John C. Bollenbacher, Louis A. Simon, Neal A. Melick	(Note: Houses the New Deal mural The New Stagecoach by Roy Hilton. Another mural, Building of Westfield was destroyed in 1964 when the post office was renovated.)	
United States Post Office (Westwood, New Jersey)	Westwood	1935		Louis A. Simon, Neal A. Melick, John G. Helmers, Mahnker & Schultz	(Note: Originally house the New Deal metal relief Pegasus with Messenger by Hunt Diederich, now destroyed.)	
United States Post Office (Wildwood, New Jersey)	Wildwood	1936			(Note: Houses the polyptych New Deal mural, Arrival of Fall Catalogue, by Dennis Burlingame.)	
