= Vivian B. Smith =

American architect (1886–1952)

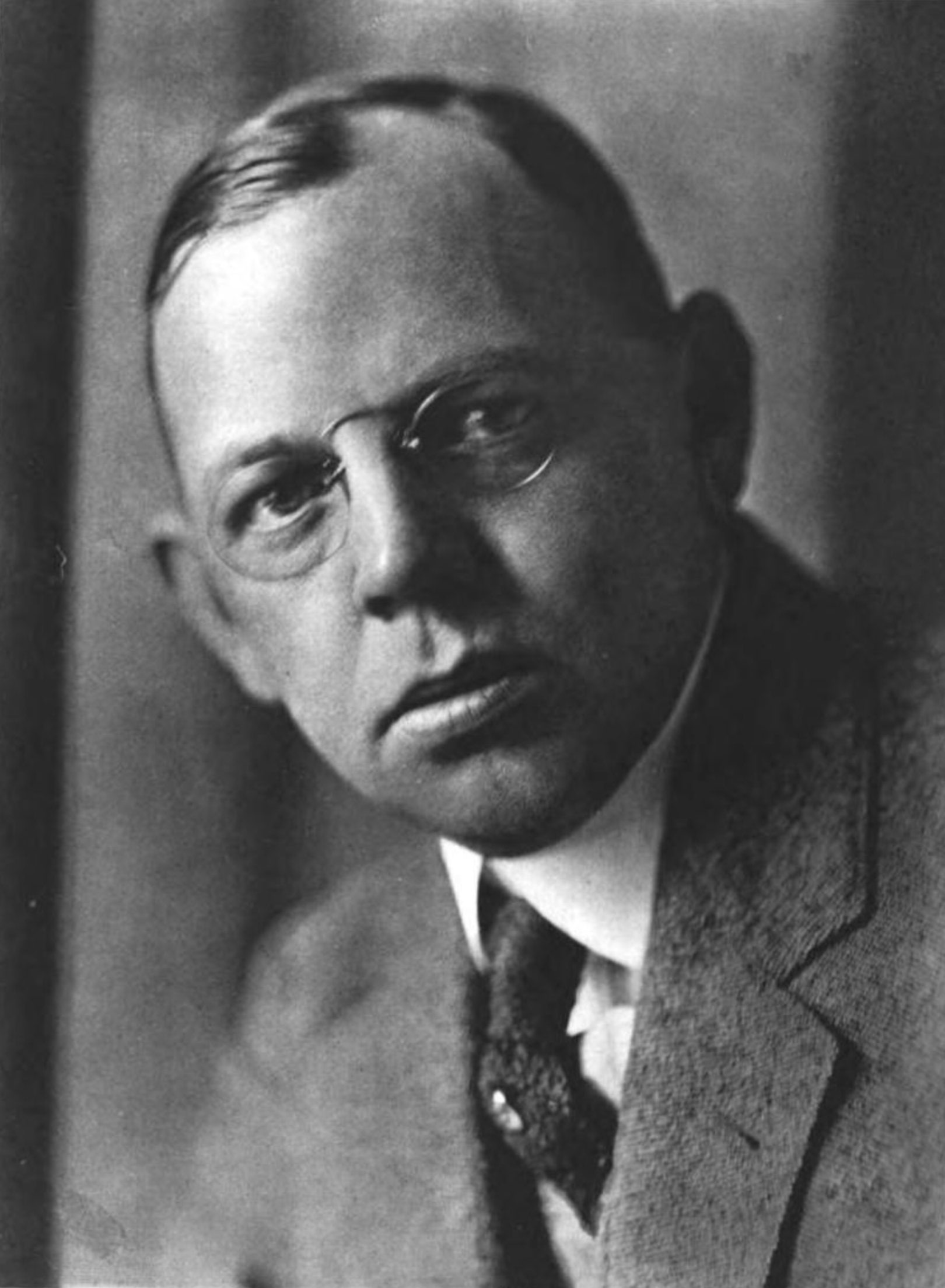
- Vivian B. Smith, c. 1924
- Born: July 8, 1886; Ocean City, New Jersey, U.S.
- Died: December 6, 1952 (aged 66); Philadelphia, Pennsylvania, U.S.
- Occupation: Architect

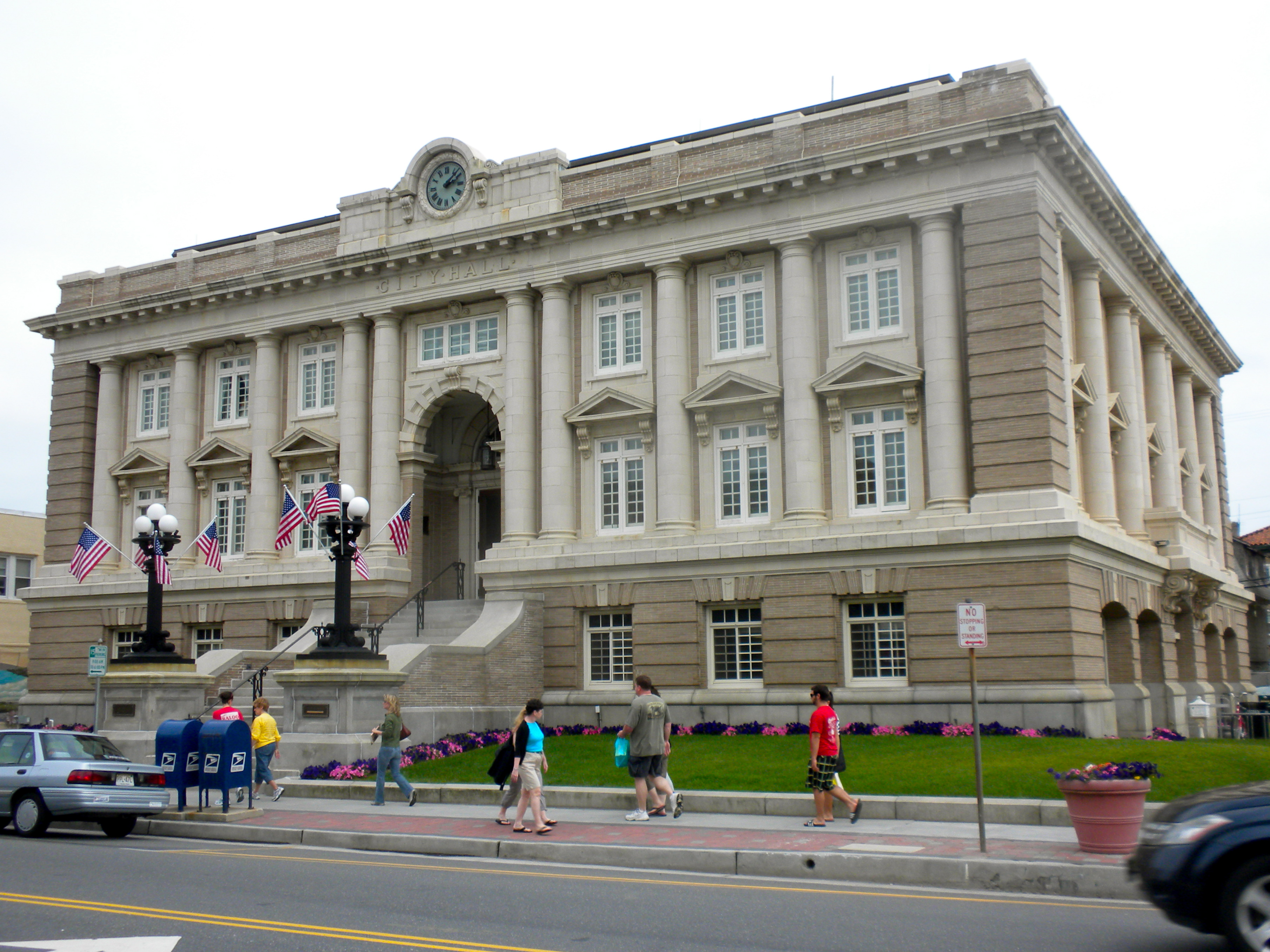
Ocean City City Hall in Ocean City, New Jersey, designed by Smith & Henderer in the Beaux-Arts style and completed in 1915.

Vivian B. Smith (July 8, 1886 – December 6, 1952) was an American architect from Atlantic City, New Jersey.

== Life and career ==
Smith was born July 8, 1886, in Ocean City, New Jersey, to Lewis S. Smith and Hannah (Holmes) Smith. After his schooling, he went to Philadelphia, where he worked for Charles L. Hoffman and other architects.

In 1907, he returned to the coast to work for architect Harvey J. Shumway, an architect who had practiced in Atlantic City since 1895. After Shumway's death in December 1909, Smith opened his own office in Atlantic City in January.

In 1913 he, in association with Ocean City architect Earle M. Henderer, submitted an entry in the competition to design the new Ocean City City Hall, which they won. When construction began in 1914 they formed a formal partnership, Smith & Henderer, which lasted until at least 1916. The Beaux-Arts city hall would garner Smith early acclaim, and he would use images of the building in his later advertisements. Though best known for his hotels and public buildings, Smith's largest work was the designing and supervision of Belcoville in Weymouth Township in 1918. This was a planned community of five thousand people for workers of the Bethlehem Loading Company, a World War I-era munitions plant operated by Bethlehem Steel. Smith practiced in Atlantic City for over twenty-five years, well into the Great Depression.

Smith joined the American Institute of Architects in 1921. He was the first Atlantic City architect to be a member of the organization.

== Personal life ==
Smith was married twice, first to Ella Dawson, who died in 1919, and second to Josephine Cross. He had a son with his first wife, and two daughters with his second. Smith and his family lived in Ventnor City, New Jersey.

== Death ==
Smith died December 5, 1952, in a hospital in Philadelphia, at the age of 66.

== Legacy ==
Smith's buildings were designed in the popular revival styles of the day, including the Beaux-Arts, Colonial Revival, and Gothic Revival styles. He also adopted more eclectic styles for some buildings, like the Spanish Colonial Revival for the Flanders Hotel and Music Pier in Ocean City or the Venetian Gothic for the Freeman Building in Atlantic City. These were uncommon in the northeast, where they usually appeared at resorts.

At least five buildings designed by Smith have been listed in the United States National Register of Historic Places.

== Architectural works ==
- Ocean City City Hall, 861 Asbury Ave, Ocean City, New Jersey (1914–15, NRHP 1997)
- Breakers Hotel, S New Jersey Ave, and Boardwalk, Atlantic City, New Jersey (1915–16, demolished 1974)
- Belcoville Fire Station, 1201 Loretta Ave, Belcoville, New Jersey (1918)
- Belcoville Post Office, (Note: Other Smith-designed remains of the Bethlehem Loading Company are included in the Bethlehem Loading Company Mays Landing Plant Archeological Historic District, NRHP-listed in 2006.) 1201 Madden Ave, Belcoville, New Jersey (1918, NRHP 2008)
- Segal Building, 1200 Atlantic Ave, Atlantic City, New Jersey (1920, NRHP 1984)
- Flanders Hotel, 719 E 11th St, Ocean City, New Jersey (1922–23, NRHP 2009)
- Freeman Building, 1516 Atlantic Ave, Atlantic City, New Jersey (1922)
- Ventnor Community Church, 5300 Ventnor Ave, Ventnor City, New Jersey (1922)
- Elks Building, 124 S Virginia Ave, Atlantic City, New Jersey (1924, demolished)
- Ocean City High School, 550 Atlantic Ave, Ocean City, New Jersey (1924, demolished 2005)
- Ventnor City Hall, 6201 Atlantic Ave, Ventnor City, New Jersey (1928, NRHP 1996)
- Ocean City Music Pier, 825 Boardwalk, Ocean City, New Jersey (1929)
- The Senator, 166 S Carolina Ave, Atlantic City, New Jersey (1930, demolished 1998)
- Stanley Holmes Village, (Note: New Jersey's first public housing complex, designed by associated architects J. Vaughan Mathis, Vivian B. Smith and Herman Turon of Atlantic City, with Mathis in charge.) Adriatic Ave, Atlantic City, New Jersey (1936–37)

== Gallery of architectural works ==
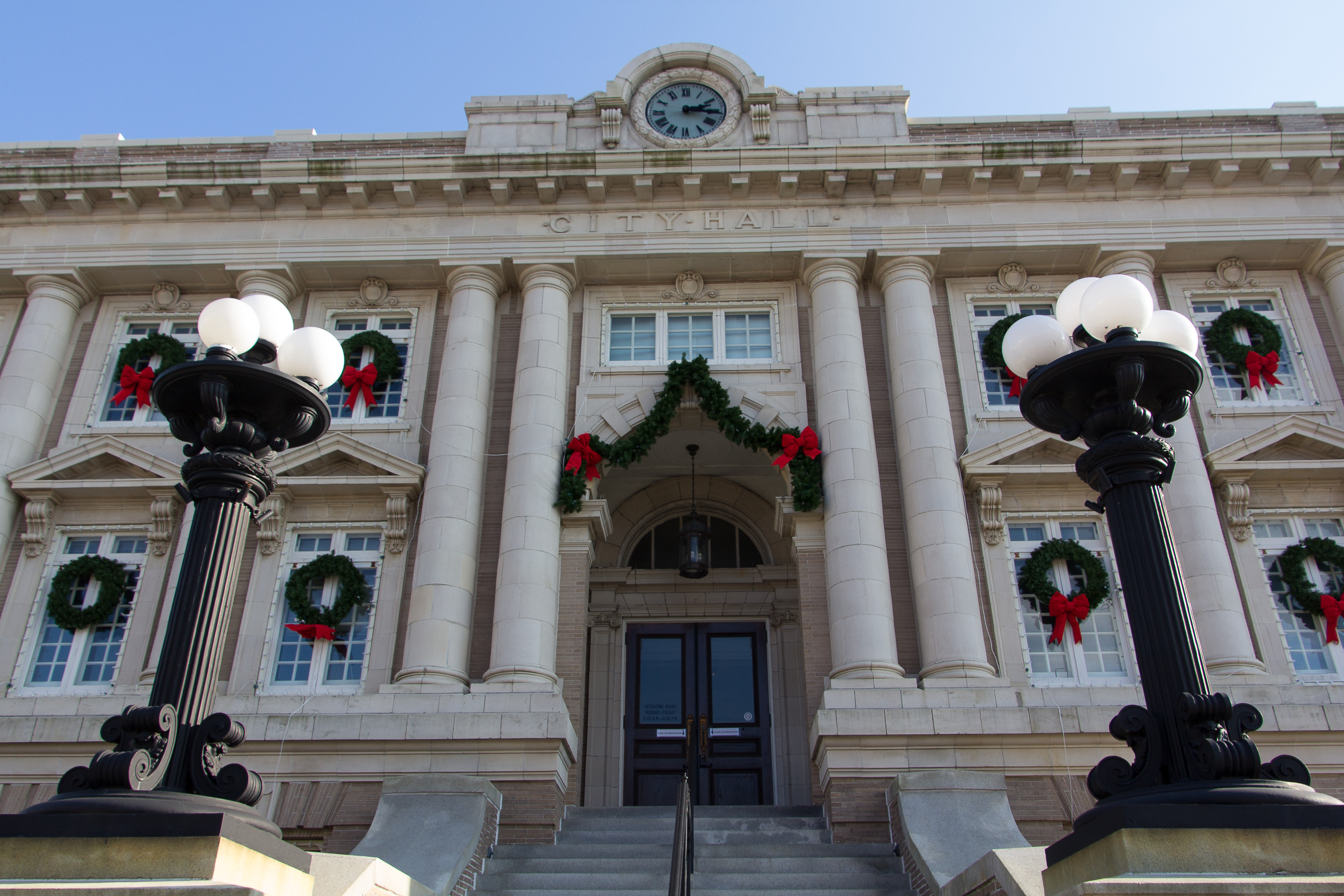
Ocean City City Hall, Ocean City, New Jersey, 1914-15

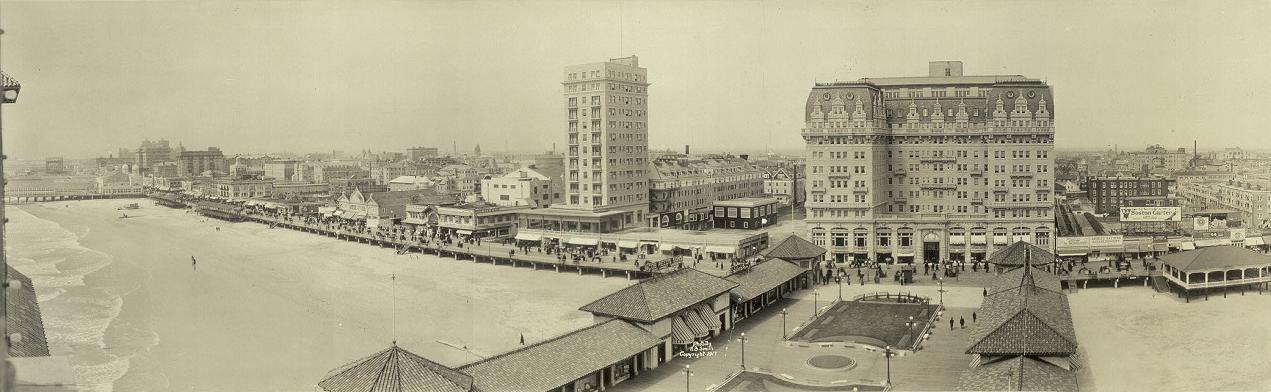
Breakers Hotel (center right), Atlantic City, New Jersey, 1915-16

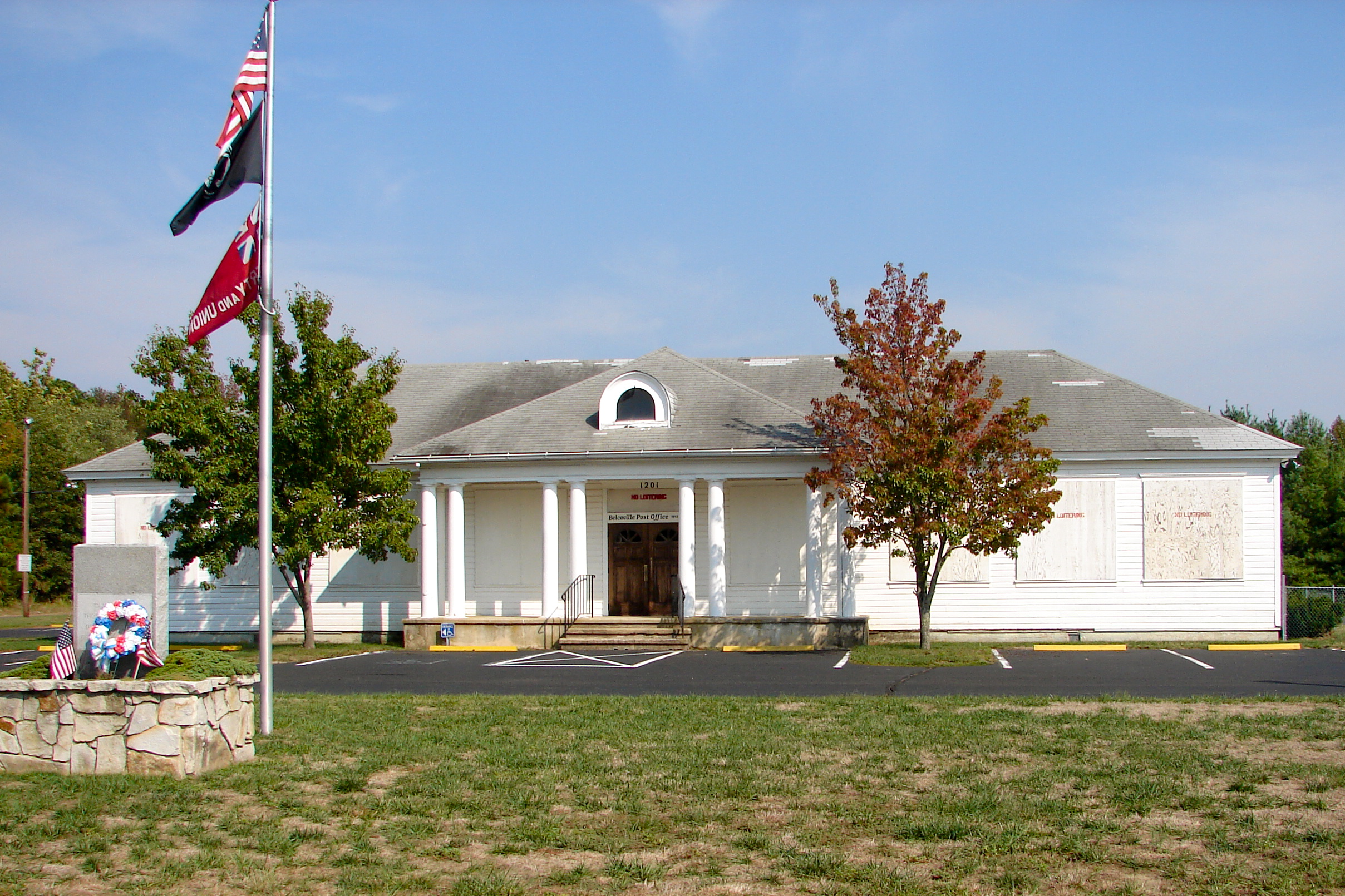
Belcoville Post Office, Belcoville, New Jersey, 1918.

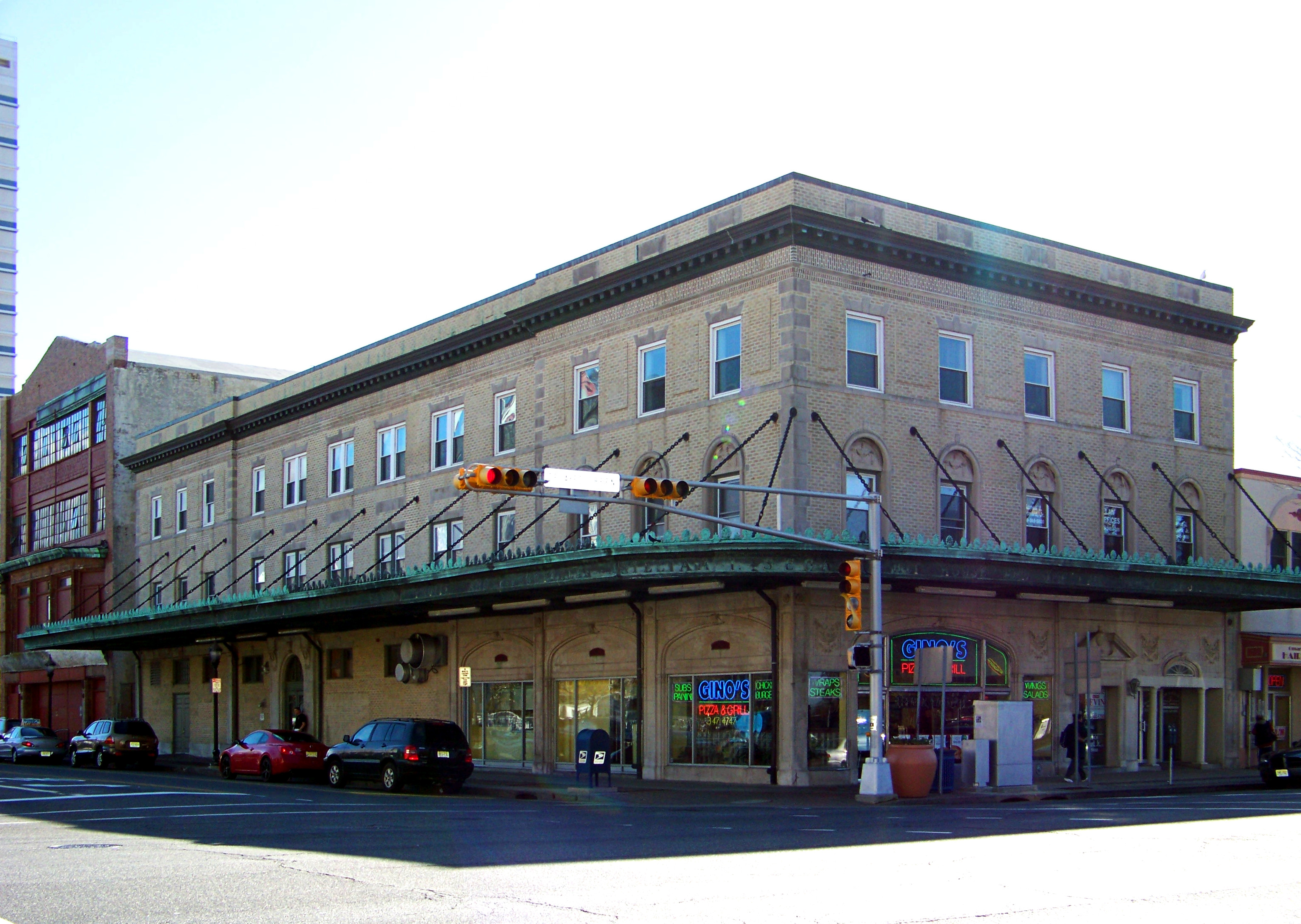
Segal Building, Atlantic City, New Jersey, 1920

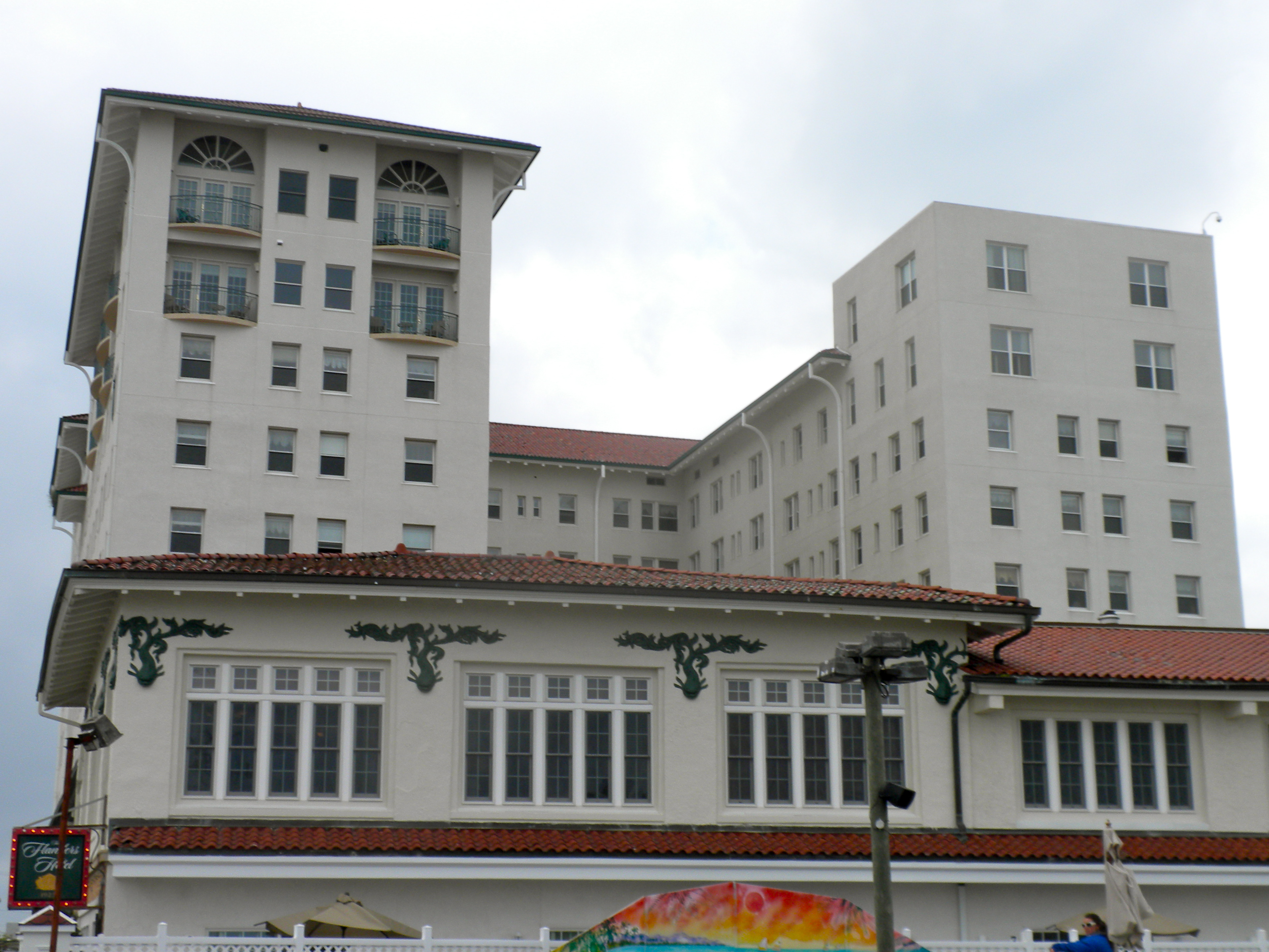
Flanders Hotel, Ocean City, New Jersey, 1922-23

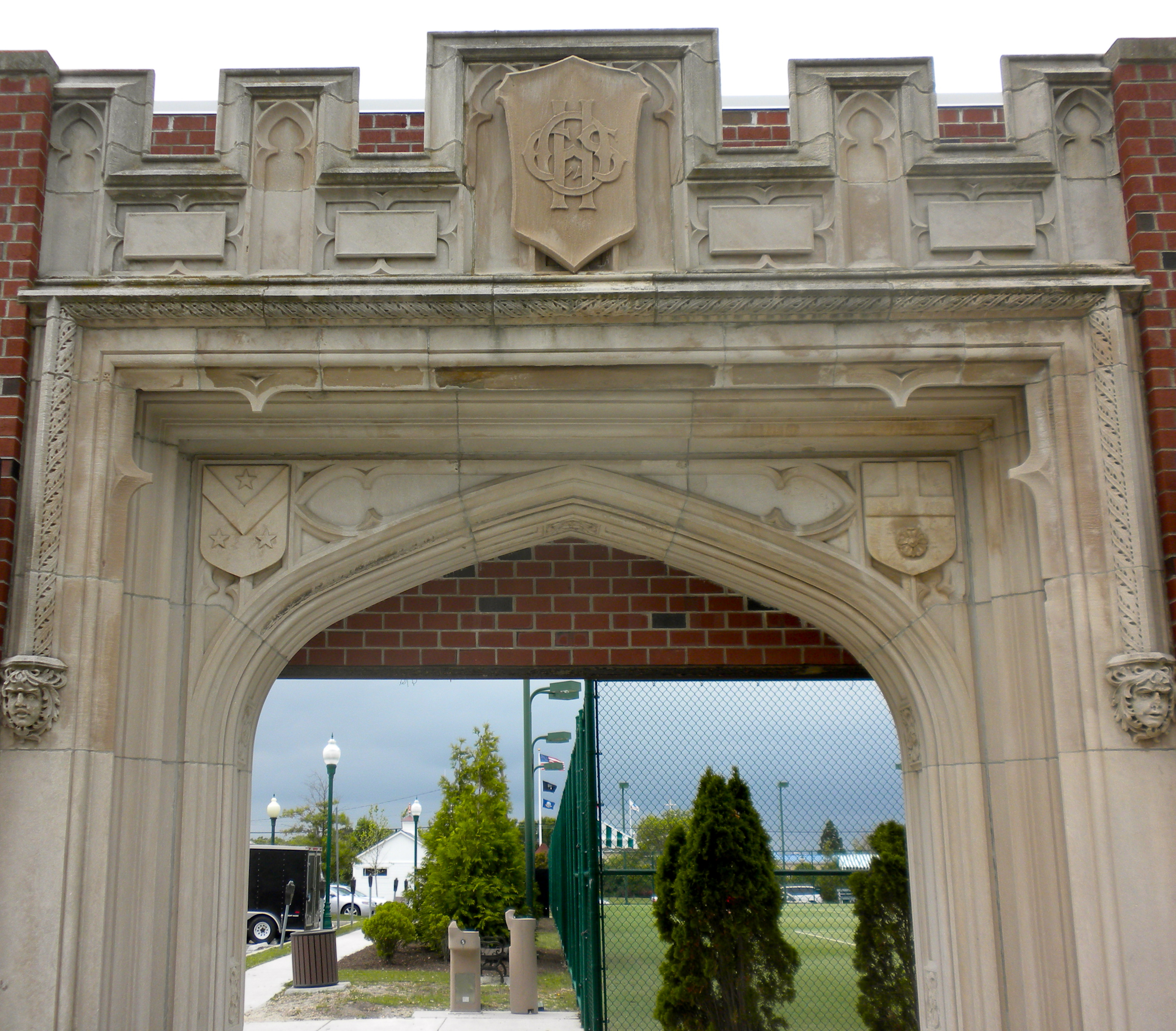
Surviving entrance of the Ocean City High School, Ocean City, New Jersey, 1924

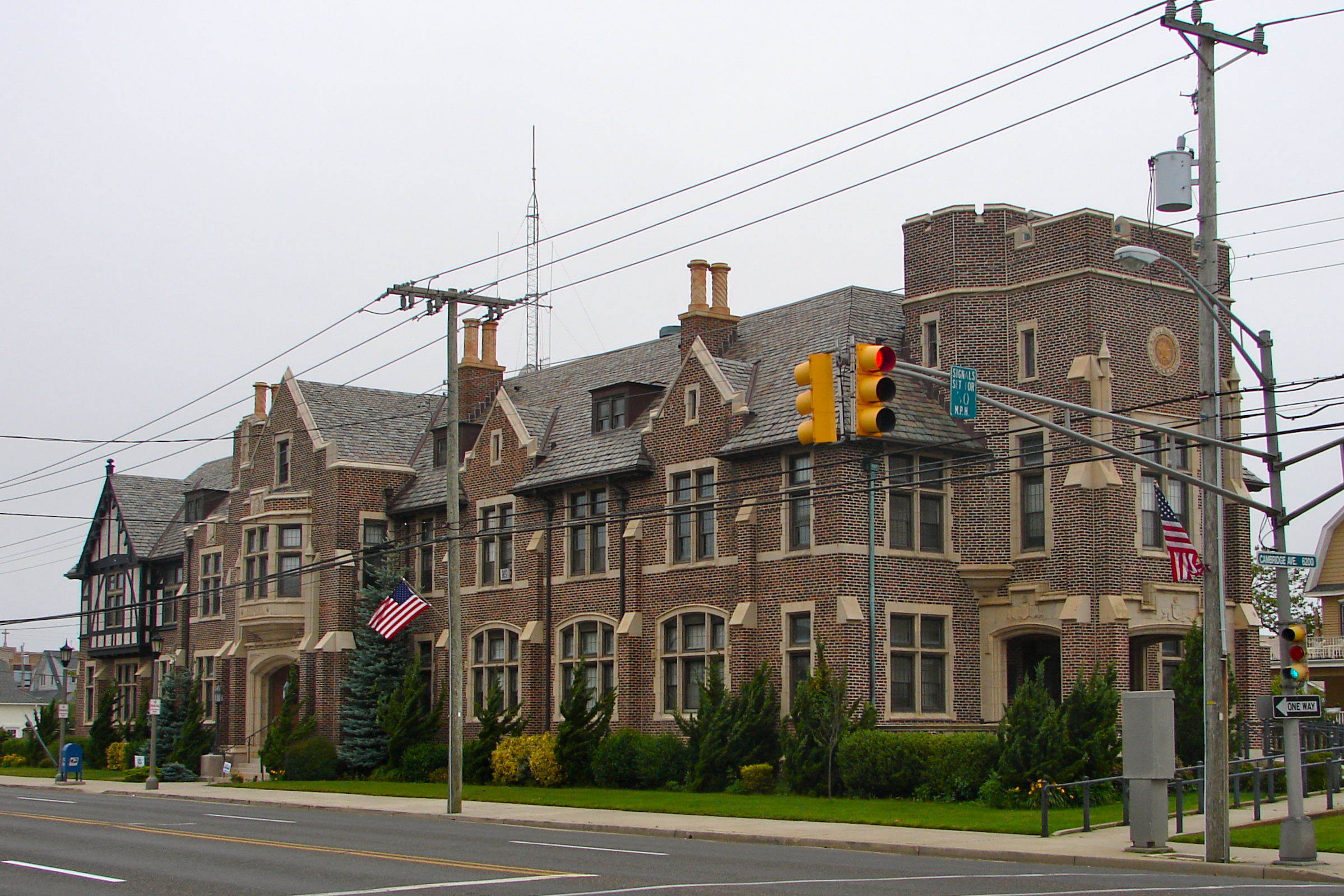
Ventnor City Hall, Ventnor City, New Jersey, 1928

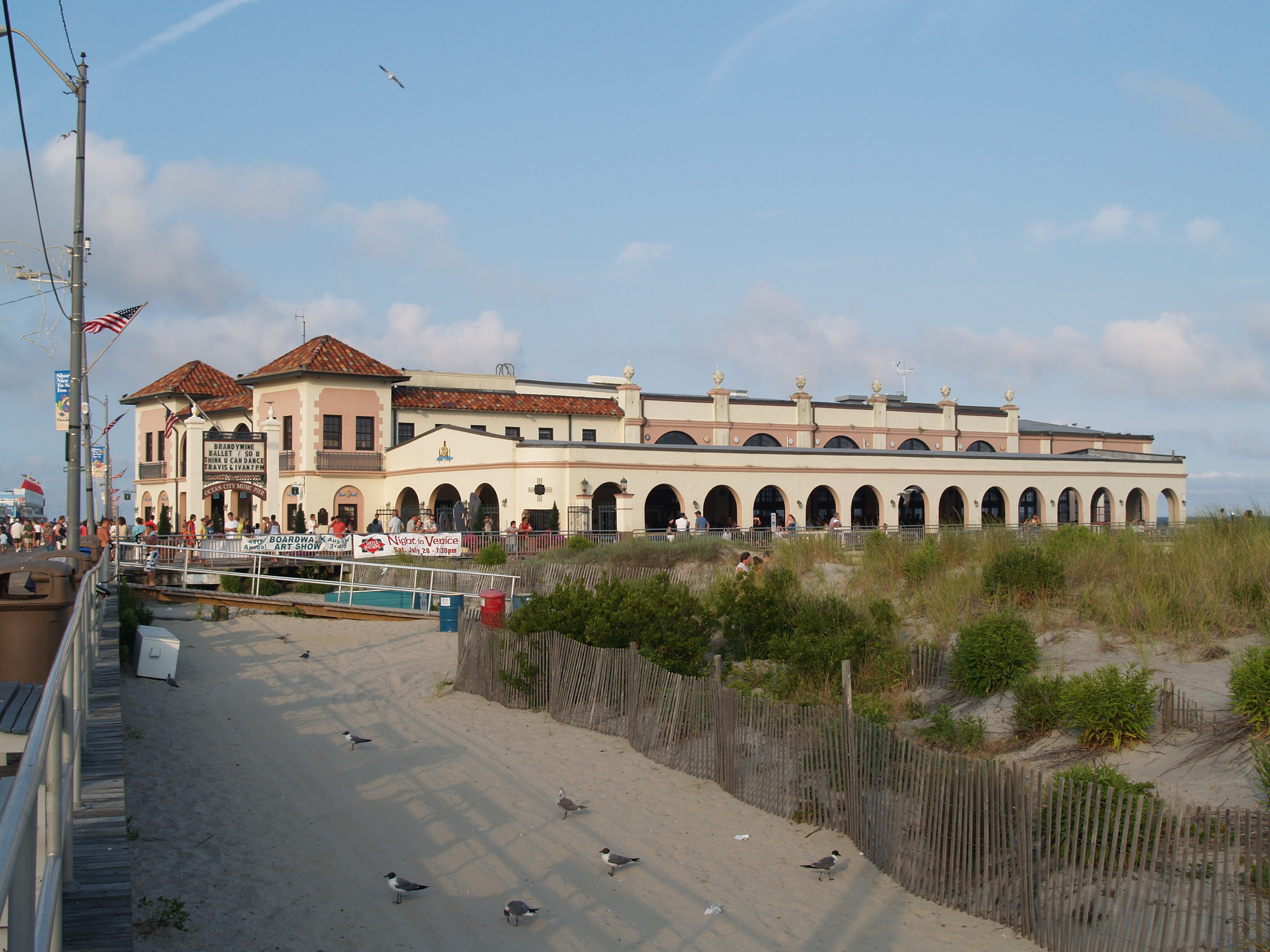
Ocean City Music Pier, Ocean City, New Jersey, 1929

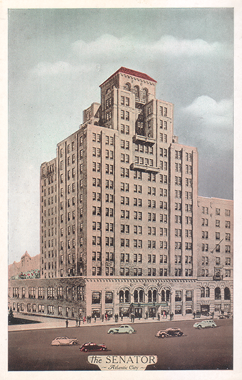
The Senator, Atlantic City, New Jersey, 1930
