= Ocean City City Hall =

- U.S. National Register of Historic Places
- New Jersey Register of Historic Places
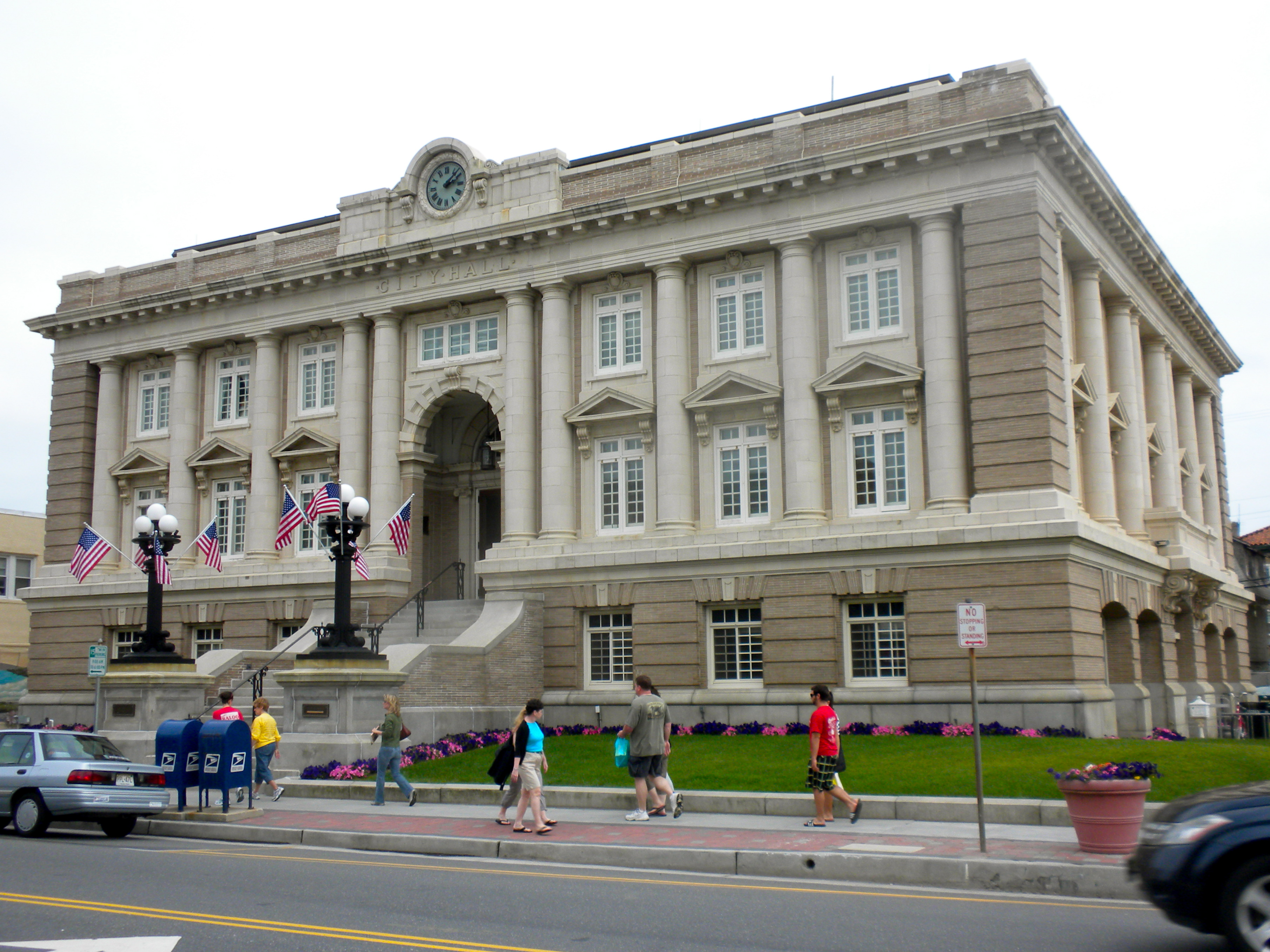
- Ocean City City Hall in 2010.

- Location within Cape May County, New Jersey Location within New Jersey Location within the United States
- Location: Junction of 9th Street and Asbury Avenue, Ocean City, New Jersey
- Coordinates: 39°16′43″N 74°34′34″W
- Area: 0.3 acres (0.12 ha)
- Built: 1914
- Architect: Vivian B. Smith
- Architectural style: Beaux Arts
- NRHP reference No.: 97000565
- NJRHP No.: 3058

Significant dates
- Added to NRHP: June 13, 1997
- Designated NJRHP: April 21, 1997

Ocean City City Hall is located in Ocean City, New Jersey, United States. The building was built in 1914 and added to the National Register of Historic Places on June 13, 1997. To celebrate its 100th anniversary, it was made the subject of the 2014 Ocean City Seasonal Beach Tag.

Every fall, students of Ocean City High School turn the building into a Haunted House to celebrate Halloween, although there have been gaps where this did not happen.

== Geography and setting ==
Ocean City City Hall is a three-story building that is located at the corner of the intersection of Ninth Street and Asbury Avenue on a 0.3 acre lot. It faces Asbury Avenue, and is along the main corridor that enters the city. In 1914, the same year the building was finished, a causeway connecting Ocean City with Somers Point was opened.

== History ==
In 1896, the location of the current building was an undeveloped lot, owned by the Borough of Ocean City. In 1896, Volunteer fire Company #1 built their headquarters on the site as a wood-frame structure. After their 1911 election, the newly elected city commission purchased the property next to the fire house for $6,500, with the intention of constructing a city hall. At that time, city commissioners held meetings at the Massey & Edwards building at Eighth Street and Wesley Avenue. On December 6, 1912, the commissioners passed a resolution to advertise for plans to construct a new city hall, intending to make the new building a gateway to the city once the newly approved Somers Point–Ocean City bridge was opened. In April 1913, the city commission passed Ordinance #45, which authorized the costs for the new building. Then-mayor Harry Headley voiced his support, noting that Ocean City was the only town in the county without a city hall. Residents objected to the cost and need of the new building, resulting in a special referendum on August 1, 1913. Voters approved the construction of the new facility, and six days later, the city commission secured the plans and specifications of the new city hall.

The plan chosen by the Young Men's Progressive League was designed by architect Vivian B. Smith in collaboration with Earle M. Henderer. The original plan featured a larger building with a dome, but the design was turned down for a more affordable option. On April 11, 1914, the cornerstone was laid, marking the beginning of construction. The building was completed by the end of the year at cost of $75,000, and opened to public tours on January 1, 1915. Upset at the high cost of the building, residents did not re-elect Mayor Headley amid an organized opposition campaign.

On the Ninth Street side, five archways were originally designed to house fire vehicles. This served as the location for the No. 1 and No. 3 fire houses. The building also originally housed the police department, containing a jail cell.

On February 6, 1997, the city government requested that the City Hall be listed on the National Register of Historic Places. This request was formally approved on June 13 of that year.

In 2012, floodwaters from Hurricane Sandy damaged the first floor of the building, causing the offices to be relocated. The town's city council approved a $1.17 million contract to rebuild and improve the first floor, including improved flood gates, water proofing up to 4 ft (1.2 m) deep, and a new layout that added a public information area and larger bathrooms.

To celebrate its 100th anniversary, the building was made the subject of the 2014 Ocean City seasonal beach tag.

== Architecture ==
An example of Beaux-Arts architecture, the building is made of brick, stone, and terracotta around a steel frame. A stairway, leading from Asbury Avenue to the building's second floor, is made of brick with stone coping, adjoined by two cast iron light fixtures, and two columns extending to the third floor. The east and north sides of the building both face alleyways with rectangular window openings. On the building's frieze below the roof, terracotta letters spell City Hall. The roof is surrounded by a parapet, and the top of the roof has three skylights.

== See also ==
- National Register of Historic Places listings in Cape May County, New Jersey
