= Head of the River Church =

Historic church in New Jersey, US

- U.S. National Register of Historic Places
- New Jersey Register of Historic Places
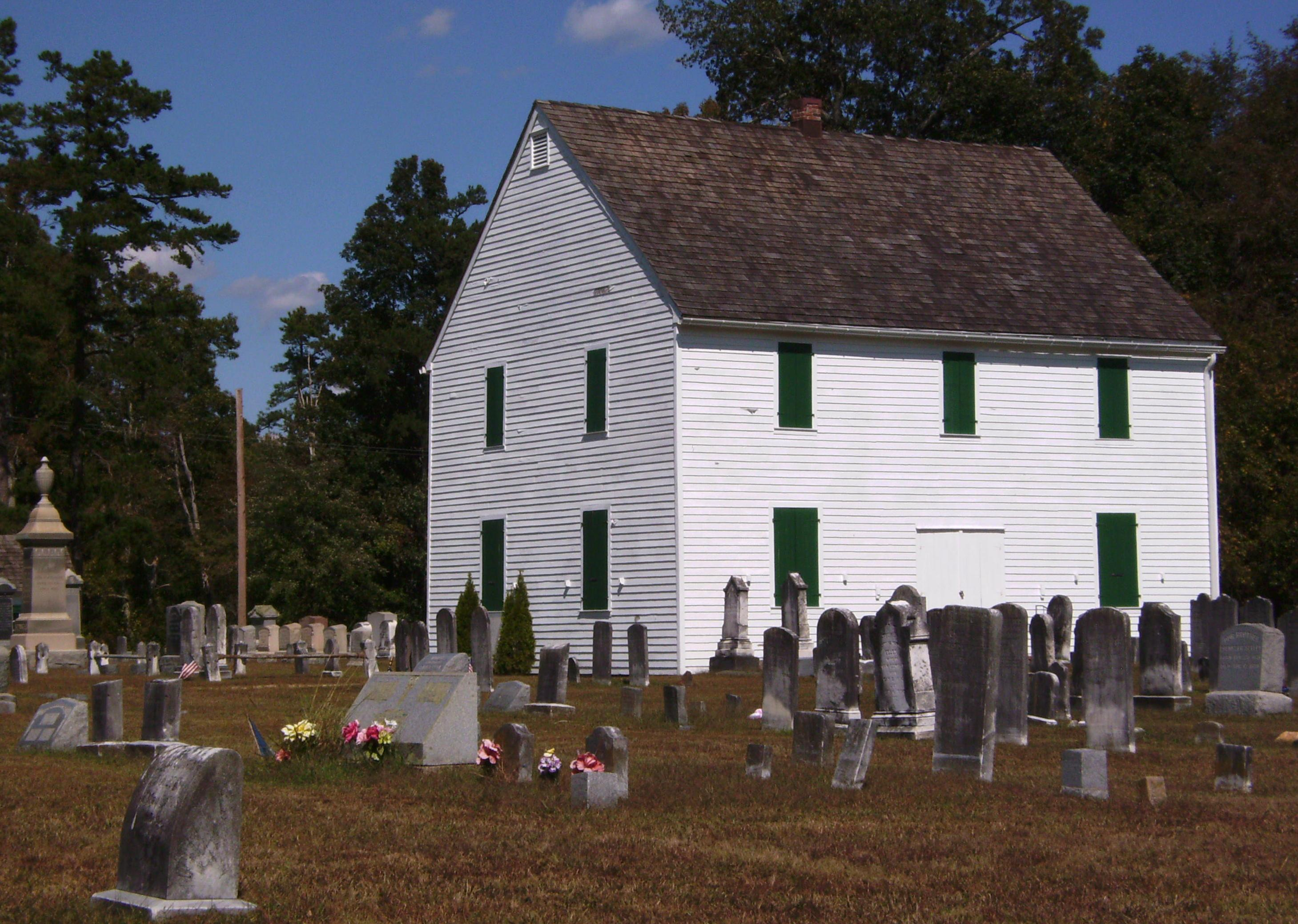

- Location within Atlantic County, New Jersey Location within New Jersey Location within the United States
- Location: NJ 49, Estell Manor, New Jersey
- Coordinates: 39°18′38″N 74°49′19″W
- Area: 6 acres (2.4 ha)
- Built: 1792
- NRHP reference No.: 79001467
- NJRHP No.: 416

Significant dates
- Added to NRHP: March 07, 1979
- Designated NJRHP: December 19, 1977

Head of the River Church is a historic Methodist church on Route 49 in Estell Manor, Atlantic County, New Jersey, United States.

It was built in 1792 and added to the National Register of Historic Places in 1979.

== See also ==
- National Register of Historic Places listings in Atlantic County, New Jersey
