= The Flanders Hotel =

- U.S. National Register of Historic Places
- New Jersey Register of Historic Places
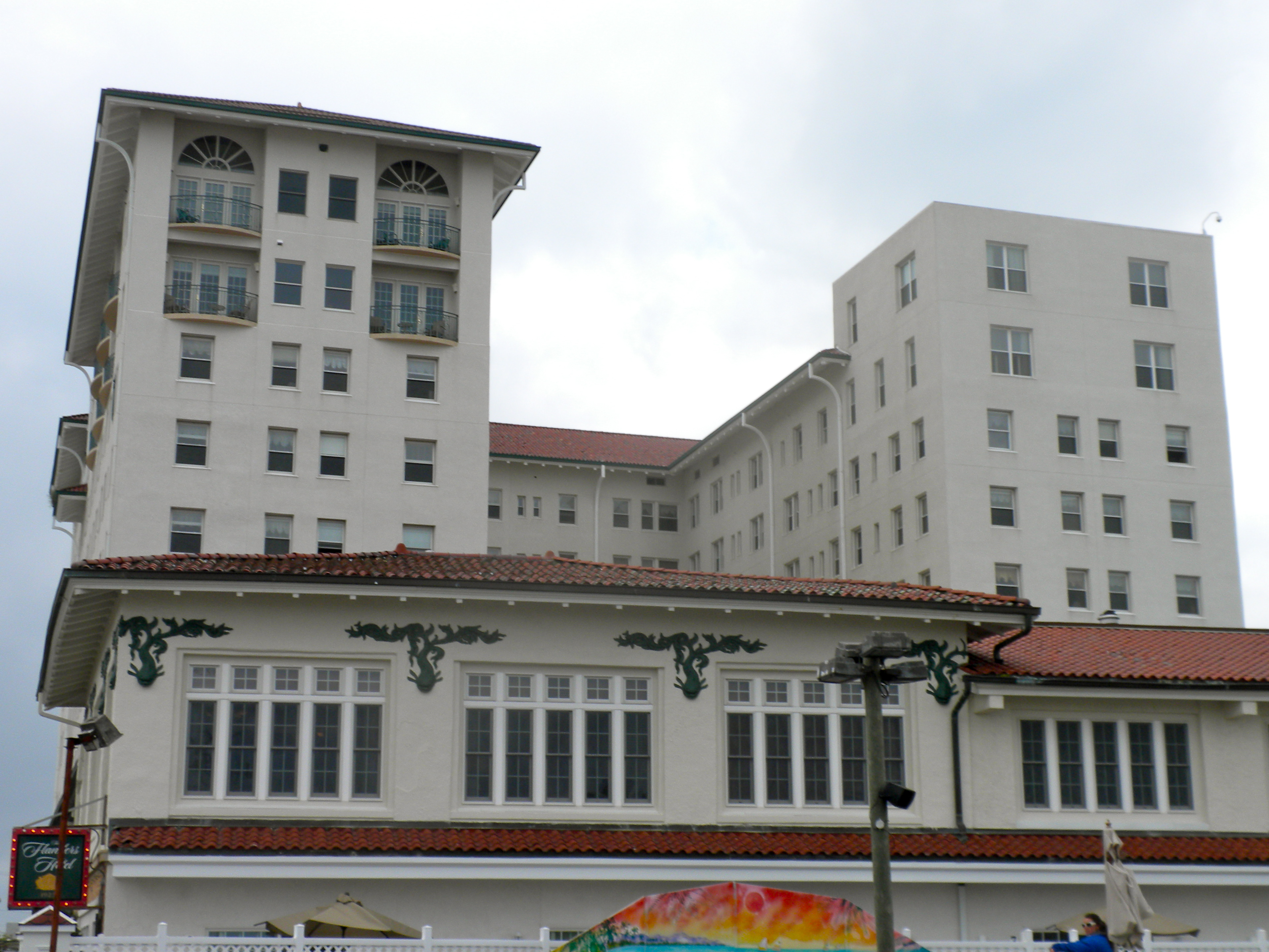
- The Flanders Hotel, May 2010

- Location within Cape May County, New Jersey Location within New Jersey Location within the United States
- Location: 719 East 11th Street, Ocean City, New Jersey
- Coordinates: 39°16′29″N 74°34′36″W
- Area: 1.4 acres (0.57 ha)
- Built: 1923
- Architect: Vivian B. Smith
- Architectural style: Spanish Colonial Revival
- NRHP reference No.: 09000939
- NJRHP No.: 4933

Significant dates
- Added to NRHP: November 20, 2009
- Designated NJRHP: August 20, 2009

The Flanders Hotel is located at 719 East 11th Street in Ocean City in Cape May County, New Jersey. The building was added to the National Register of Historic Places on November 20, 2009, for its significance in architecture, community planning and development, and entertainment/recreation. The Flanders Hotel is named after Flanders Fields in Belgium.

== History ==
The hotel was built in 1923 by the Ocean Front Hotel Corporation. The architect Vivian B. Smith designed the building in the Spanish Colonial Revival style. The building was constructed using steel girders and concrete.

The hotel was originally managed by J. Howard Slocum until 1932, when Elwood F. Kirkman took over ownership of the hotel. James M. Dwyer purchased the building in 1996. The hotel was converted into luxury condominiums for daily rentals operating as a "Condotel" in 1997. Mr. Dwyer suffered several financial setbacks, including tax liens and personal bankruptcy. As a result of the bankruptcy, Mr. Dwyer was removed from his involvement with the hotel. In December 2005 a new board of trustees were installed, and Peter Voudouris was named president of the board of trustees and also assumed the responsibilities as general manager. He presently holds the title of director of hotel and banquet operations.

== See also ==
- National Register of Historic Places listings in Cape May County, New Jersey
