= Senator (Atlantic City hotel) =

Coordinates: 39.3589°N 74.4241°W

The Senator
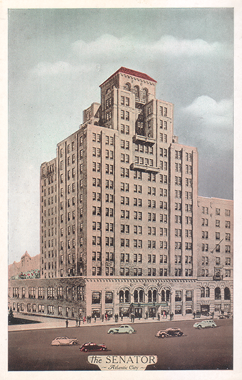
- The Senator hotel in Atlantic City, New Jersey, c. 1930s, as represented in a promotional postcard of the era. Following World War II, the hotel would feature a distinctive rooftop "Sky Cabana" sign.
- Interactive map of the The Senator area
- Former names: Hotel Ludy (1930 - 1935)
- Alternative names: The Senator Rest Home, King David Care Center (1967 - 1997)

General information
- Status: Demolished
- Type: high-rise
- Architectural style: Romanesque revival
- Classification: hotel
- Location: 166 S. South Carolina Ave., Atlantic City, New Jersey, U.S.
- Construction started: 1929
- Opened: 1930
- Closed: 1997
- Demolished: June 9, 1998

Height
- Height: 170 ft (52 m)

Technical details
- Structural system: rigid frame
- Material: steel, brick facade
- Floor count: 16
- Lifts/elevators: 3

Design and construction
- Architect: Vivian B. Smith
- Known for: Sun-N-Stars Roof
- "Things are happening at The Senator"

The Senator was an oceanside hotel located at 166 S. South Carolina Avenue in Atlantic City, New Jersey. Opened in 1930 as the Hotel Ludy, it became The Senator in 1935. The 16-story structure featured a distinctive rooftop sign "Sky Cabana". In 1967 it became an elder care residence. It was sold in 1997 and demolished in 1998.

The hotel was designed in the Romanesque Revival style and opened in 1930 as the Hotel Ludy. Vintage postcards of the era boasted of a "Solarium - Modern, colorful, with three outdoor Ocean Decks overlooking Boardwalk, Beach and Ocean" and an "atmosphere of quiet cordiality". In 1935 the hotel was combined with the adjacent Hotel Iroquois and renamed "The Senator."

In the summer of 1942, The Senator was leased by the U.S. Army for use as Army Air Force Basic Training Center No. 7.

The Senator's heyday was following the end of World War II, when it became known for its "Sun and Stars" roof that featured tanning by sunlamps by day and converted to dining in the evening. At that time sunlamps were seen as promoting a "healthy-looking summer tan". A 1948 image shows a matron in a white medical uniform tending to the Senator's sun bathers. In 1955 the hotel became the home of radio station WLDB 1490AM with its studios located on the hotel's eleventh floor. (The call letters WLDB are currently assigned to an FM band station in Milwaukee, Wisconsin.)

The Senator declined along with the fortunes of Atlantic City, and by 1965 the hotel had closed. In 1967 it became an elder care center and operated as The Senator Rest Home, ICS Care Facility Retirement Home, and finally the King David Care Center. In 1997 the facility became bankrupt. The residents were relocated and the former Senator closed for good. It was sold for a casino expansion and demolished in 1998 after some of its terra cotta work was removed by an architectural salvage company.
