= Segal Building =

Historic building in New Jersey, US

- U.S. National Register of Historic Places
- New Jersey Register of Historic Places
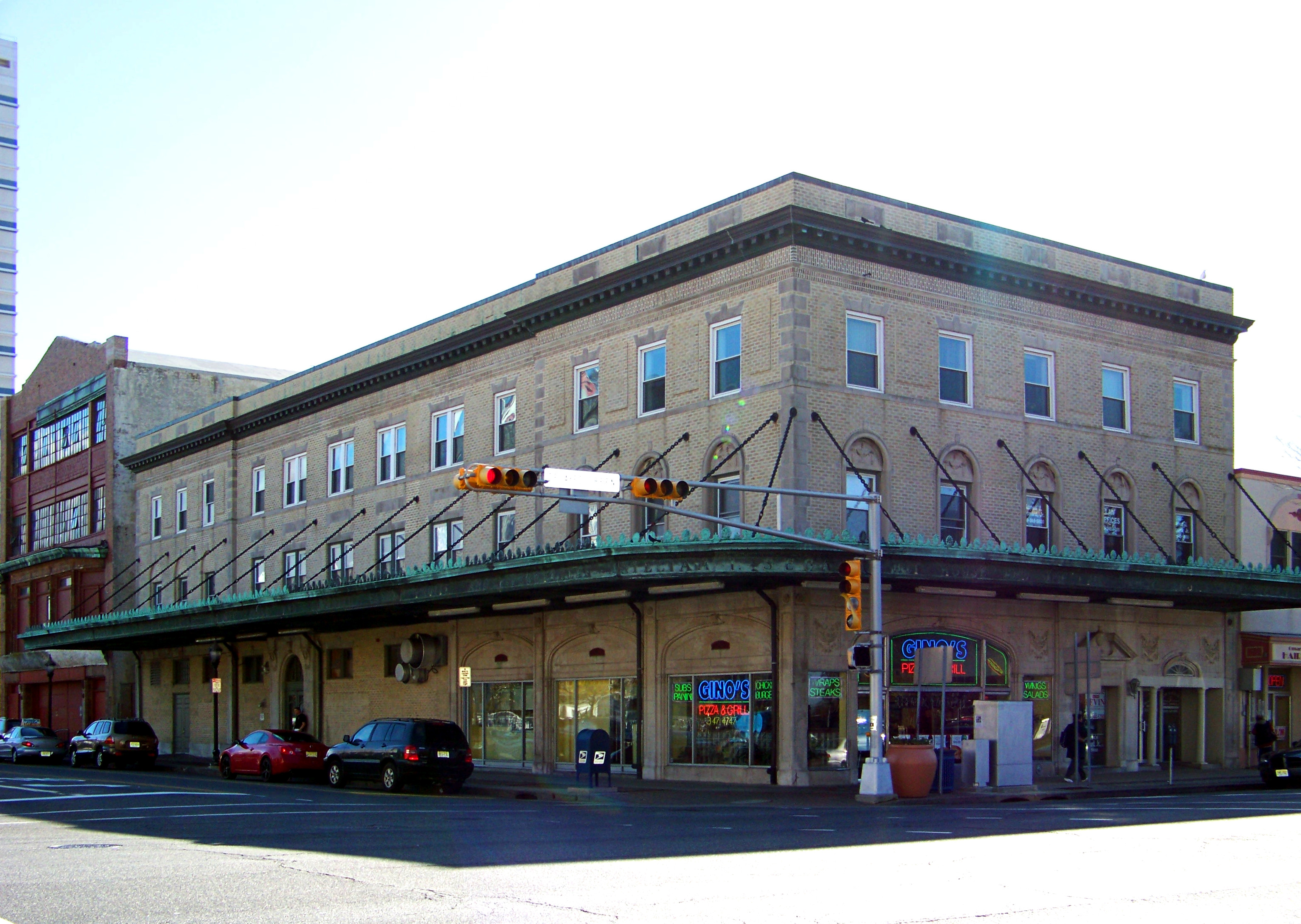

- Location within Atlantic County, New Jersey Location within New Jersey Location within the United States
- Location: 1200 Atlantic Avenue, Atlantic City, New Jersey
- Coordinates: 39°21′46″N 74°25′35″W
- Area: 0.2 acres (0.081 ha)
- Built: 1920
- Architect: Vivian B. Smith
- Architectural style: Classical Revival
- NRHP reference No.: 84002517
- NJRHP No.: 394

Significant dates
- Added to NRHP: February 9, 1984
- Designated NJRHP: January 6, 1984

Segal Building is located in Atlantic City, New Jersey, United States. The building was built in 1920 and added to the National Register of Historic Places on February 9, 1984.

== See also ==
- National Register of Historic Places listings in Atlantic County, New Jersey
