= Estell Manor, New Jersey =

City in Atlantic County, New Jersey, US

- City
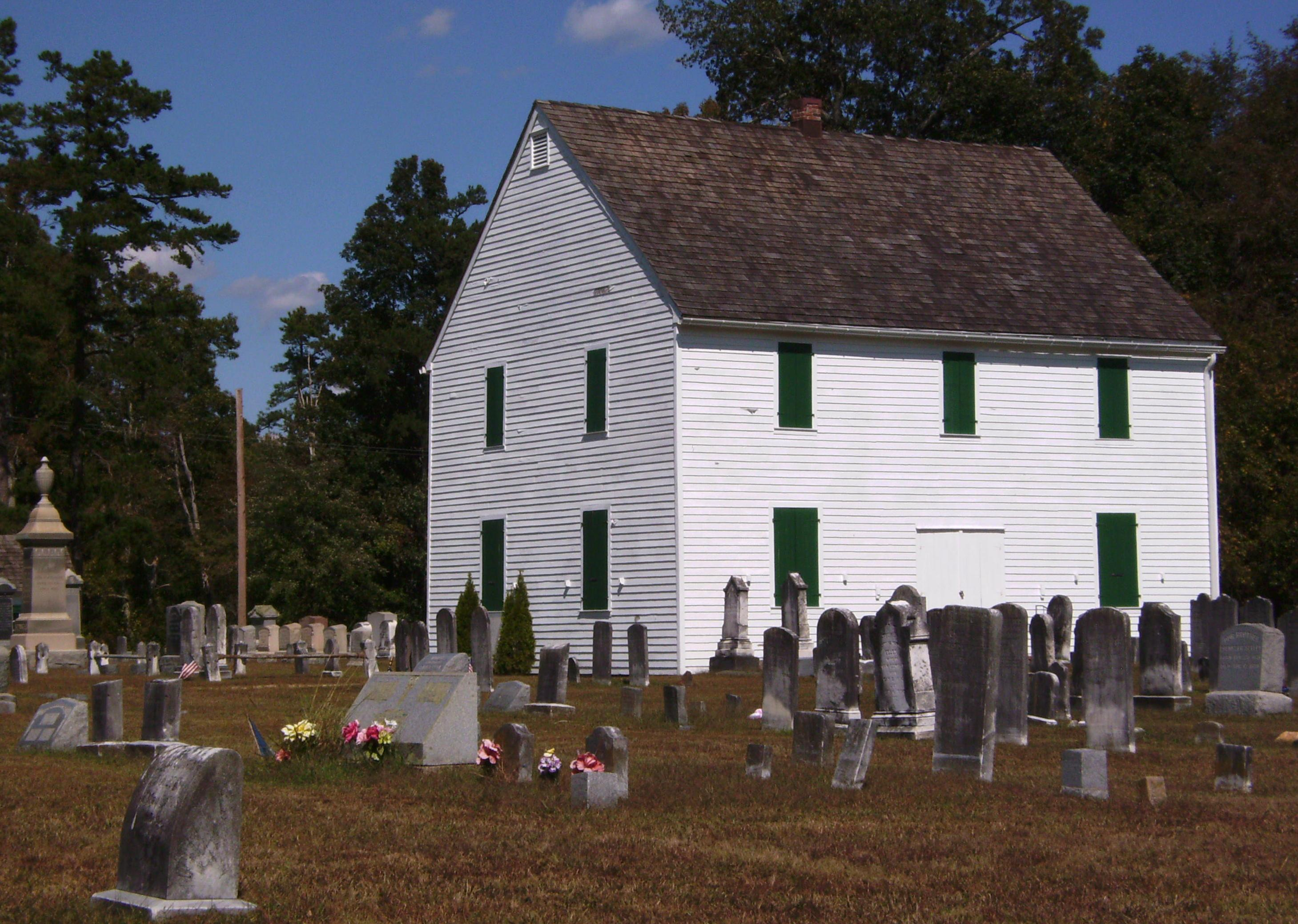
- Head of the River Church
- Motto: "Small City Charm in the Pines"
- Location of Estell Manor in Atlantic County highlighted in red (left). Inset map: Location of Atlantic County in New Jersey highlighted in orange (right).

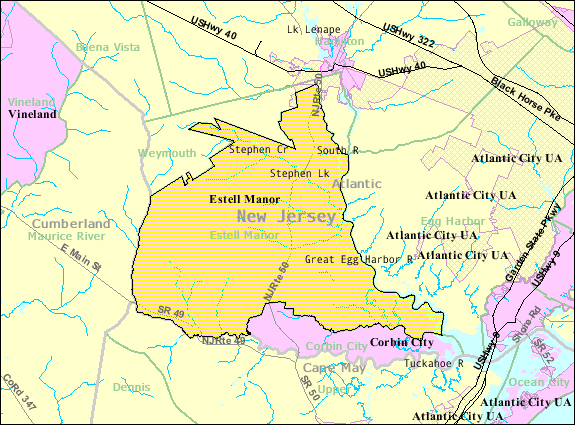
- Census Bureau map of Estell Manor, New Jersey

- Location in Atlantic County Location in New Jersey Location in the United States
- Coordinates: 39.353933°N 74.775135°W
- Country: United States
- State: New Jersey
- County: Atlantic
- Incorporated: March 14, 1925

Government
  - Type: Faulkner Act (small municipality)
  - Body: City Council
  - Mayor: Elizabeth Owen (R, term ends December 31, 2025)
  - Municipal clerk: Vacant

Area
  - Total: 55.19 sq mi (142.93 km^{2})
  - Land: 53.39 sq mi (138.27 km^{2})
  - Water: 1.80 sq mi (4.65 km^{2}) 3.26%
  - Rank: 27th of 565 in state 5th of 23 in county
- Elevation: 39 ft (12 m)

Population (2020)
  - Total: 1,668
  - Estimate (2023): 1,679
  - Rank: 504th of 565 in state 20th of 23 in county
  - Density: 31.2/sq mi (12.0/km^{2})
  - Rank: 559th of 565 in state 23rd of 23 in county
- Time zone: UTC−05:00 (Eastern (EST))
  - Summer (DST): UTC−04:00 (Eastern (EDT))
- ZIP Code: 08319
- Area code: 609
- FIPS code: 3400121870
- GNIS feature ID: 0885212
- Website: www.estellmanor.org

Estell Manor is a city in Atlantic County, in the U.S. state of New Jersey. Geographically, the city, and all of Atlantic County, is part of the South Jersey region and of the Atlantic City-Hammonton metropolitan statistical area, which in turn is included in the Philadelphia metropolitan area.

As of the 2020 United States census, the city's population was 1,668, a decrease of 67 (−3.9%) from the 2010 census count of 1,735, which in turn reflected an increase of 150 (+9.5%) from the 1,585 counted in the 2000 census.

Estell Manor was incorporated as a city by an act of the New Jersey Legislature on March 14, 1925, from portions of Weymouth Township.

== Geography ==
According to the United States Census Bureau, the city had a total area of 55.18 square miles (142.93 km^{2}), including 53.39 square miles (138.27 km^{2}) of land and 1.80 square miles (4.65 km^{2}) of water (3.26%).

Unincorporated communities, localities and place names located partially or completely within the city include Estellville, Gibsons Landing, Head of River, Hunters Mill, Oakville, Old Etna Furnace, Russia, Steelmans Landing, Walkers Forge and Warners Mill.

Estell Manor borders the municipalities of Corbin City, Egg Harbor Township, Hamilton Township and Weymouth Township in Atlantic County; and Upper Township in Cape May County; and Maurice River Township in Cumberland County.

The city is one of 56 South Jersey municipalities that are included within the New Jersey Pinelands National Reserve, a protected natural area of unique ecology covering 1,100,000 acres (450,000 ha), that has been classified as a United States Biosphere Reserve and established by Congress in 1978 as the nation's first National Reserve. All of the city is included either in the state-designated Pinelands area (which includes portions of Atlantic County, along with areas in Burlington, Camden, Cape May, Cumberland, Gloucester and Ocean counties) or in the Pinelands National Reserve.

=== Climate ===
Climate data for Estell Manor, New Jersey (1991–2020 normals, extremes 1965–present)
| Month | Jan | Feb | Mar | Apr | May | Jun | Jul | Aug | Sep | Oct | Nov | Dec | Year |
|---|---|---|---|---|---|---|---|---|---|---|---|---|---|
| Record high °F (°C) | 75 (24) | 76 (24) | 88 (31) | 97 (36) | 97 (36) | 102 (39) | 107 (42) | 100 (38) | 99 (37) | 95 (35) | 83 (28) | 78 (26) | 107 (42) |
| Mean maximum °F (°C) | 65.2 (18.4) | 66.0 (18.9) | 75.4 (24.1) | 85.6 (29.8) | 89.7 (32.1) | 93.8 (34.3) | 96.3 (35.7) | 93.9 (34.4) | 90.1 (32.3) | 83.0 (28.3) | 74.6 (23.7) | 65.8 (18.8) | 97.2 (36.2) |
| Mean daily maximum °F (°C) | 43.2 (6.2) | 45.9 (7.7) | 53.2 (11.8) | 64.5 (18.1) | 73.3 (22.9) | 81.7 (27.6) | 86.5 (30.3) | 84.7 (29.3) | 78.7 (25.9) | 67.4 (19.7) | 57.1 (13.9) | 47.8 (8.8) | 65.3 (18.5) |
| Daily mean °F (°C) | 33.1 (0.6) | 35.2 (1.8) | 42.2 (5.7) | 52.6 (11.4) | 62.1 (16.7) | 71.1 (21.7) | 76.2 (24.6) | 74.3 (23.5) | 67.8 (19.9) | 55.9 (13.3) | 46.0 (7.8) | 37.8 (3.2) | 54.5 (12.5) |
| Mean daily minimum °F (°C) | 23.0 (−5.0) | 24.5 (−4.2) | 31.2 (−0.4) | 40.8 (4.9) | 51.0 (10.6) | 60.4 (15.8) | 65.9 (18.8) | 64.0 (17.8) | 56.9 (13.8) | 44.4 (6.9) | 35.0 (1.7) | 27.7 (−2.4) | 43.7 (6.5) |
| Mean minimum °F (°C) | 4.3 (−15.4) | 7.5 (−13.6) | 14.0 (−10.0) | 25.2 (−3.8) | 33.5 (0.8) | 43.5 (6.4) | 53.4 (11.9) | 51.3 (10.7) | 41.3 (5.2) | 28.9 (−1.7) | 18.2 (−7.7) | 11.2 (−11.6) | 1.9 (−16.7) |
| Record low °F (°C) | −12 (−24) | −10 (−23) | −2 (−19) | 17 (−8) | 26 (−3) | 37 (3) | 43 (6) | 39 (4) | 34 (1) | 17 (−8) | 10 (−12) | −4 (−20) | −12 (−24) |
| Average precipitation inches (mm) | 3.81 (97) | 3.39 (86) | 4.98 (126) | 3.83 (97) | 3.52 (89) | 4.14 (105) | 4.68 (119) | 5.52 (140) | 3.93 (100) | 4.53 (115) | 3.54 (90) | 4.74 (120) | 50.61 (1,285) |
| Average snowfall inches (cm) | 6.1 (15) | 8.2 (21) | 3.4 (8.6) | 0.7 (1.8) | 0.0 (0.0) | 0.0 (0.0) | 0.0 (0.0) | 0.0 (0.0) | 0.0 (0.0) | 0.0 (0.0) | 0.0 (0.0) | 3.6 (9.1) | 22.0 (56) |
| Average extreme snow depth inches (cm) | 3.6 (9.1) | 4.1 (10) | 2.2 (5.6) | 0.4 (1.0) | 0.0 (0.0) | 0.0 (0.0) | 0.0 (0.0) | 0.0 (0.0) | 0.0 (0.0) | 0.0 (0.0) | 0.1 (0.25) | 2.3 (5.8) | 6.1 (15) |
| Average precipitation days (≥ 0.01 in) | 11.4 | 10.5 | 11.6 | 11.6 | 11.2 | 10.7 | 10.0 | 9.4 | 8.8 | 9.7 | 9.1 | 10.9 | 124.9 |
| Average snowy days (≥ 0.1 in) | 3.2 | 4.0 | 1.9 | 0.4 | 0.0 | 0.0 | 0.0 | 0.0 | 0.0 | 0.0 | 0.1 | 1.8 | 11.4 |
Source: NOAA

== Demographics ==
Historical population
| Census | Pop. | Note | %± |
|---|---|---|---|
| 1930 | 423 | | — |
| 1940 | 406 | | −4.0% |
| 1950 | 381 | | −6.2% |
| 1960 | 496 | | 30.2% |
| 1970 | 539 | | 8.7% |
| 1980 | 848 | | 57.3% |
| 1990 | 1,404 | | 65.6% |
| 2000 | 1,585 | | 12.9% |
| 2010 | 1,735 | | 9.5% |
| 2020 | 1,668 | | −3.9% |
| 2023 (est.) | 1,679 | | 0.7% |
Population sources: 1930–2000 1930; 1940–2000 2000; 2010 2020

=== 2010 census ===
The 2010 United States census counted 1,735 people, 619 households, and 488 families in the city. The population density was 32.5 per square mile (12.5/km^{2}). There were 673 housing units at an average density of 12.6 per square mile (4.9/km^{2}). The racial makeup was 96.48% (1,674) White, 0.92% (16) Black or African American, 0.12% (2) Native American, 1.61% (28) Asian, 0.00% (0) Pacific Islander, 0.17% (3) from other races, and 0.69% (12) from two or more races. Hispanic or Latino of any race were 1.04% (18) of the population.

Of the 619 households, 31.7% had children under the age of 18; 66.1% were married couples living together; 7.4% had a female householder with no husband present and 21.2% were non-families. Of all households, 16.2% were made up of individuals and 5.0% had someone living alone who was 65 years of age or older. The average household size was 2.79 and the average family size was 3.13.

23.9% of the population were under the age of 18, 7.9% from 18 to 24, 21.6% from 25 to 44, 35.6% from 45 to 64, and 11.1% who were 65 years of age or older. The median age was 43.4 years. For every 100 females, the population had 98.3 males. For every 100 females ages 18 and older there were 99.8 males.

=== 2000 census ===
As of the 2000 United States census there were 1,585 people, 528 households, and 432 families residing in the city. The population density was 29.6 inhabitants per square mile (11.4/km^{2}). There were 546 housing units at an average density of 10.2 per square mile (3.9/km^{2}). The racial makeup of the city was 94.20% White, 3.60% African American, 0.44% Native American, 0.32% Asian, 0.13% from other races, and 1.32% from two or more races. Hispanic or Latino of any race were 0.95% of the population.

There were 528 households, out of which 41.1% had children under the age of 18 living with them, 71.0% were married couples living together, 7.4% had a female householder with no husband present, and 18.0% were non-families. 13.8% of all households were made up of individuals, and 6.8% had someone living alone who was 65 years of age or older. The average household size was 2.95 and the average family size was 3.27.

In the city the population was spread out, with 30.2% under the age of 18, 6.5% from 18 to 24, 30.1% from 25 to 44, 23.6% from 45 to 64, and 9.7% who were 65 years of age or older. The median age was 37 years. For every 100 females, there were 101.9 males. For every 100 females age 18 and over, there were 101.6 males.

The median income for a household in the city was $54,653, and the median income for a family was $56,548. Males had a median income of $42,305 versus $29,219 for females. The per capita income for the city was $19,469. About 4.9% of families and 4.9% of the population were below the poverty line, including 4.9% of those under age 18 and 7.1% of those age 65 or over.

== Government ==
=== Local government ===
Estell Manor operates within the Faulkner Act (formally known as the Optional Municipal Charter Law) under the Faulkner Act (small municipality) form of New Jersey municipal government (Plan D), implemented by direct petition as of January 1, 1977. The city is one of 18 municipalities (of the 564) statewide that use this form of government, which is available to municipalities with less than 12,000 residents at the time of adoption. The city's governing body is comprised of a mayor and a four-member City Council. The mayor is directly elected to a four-year term of office and the city council members are elected at-large in partisan elections to serve three-year terms in office on a staggered basis with either one or two seats up for vote as part of the November general election in a three-year cycle.

As of 2023, the Mayor of Estell Manor is Republican Elizabeth Owen, whose term of office ends December 31, 2025. Members of the City Council are Nelson Dilg (R, 2025), Linda G. Givens (R, 2023; elected to serve an unexpired term), Thomas A. Maddox (R, 2025) and Christine Masker (R, 2024).

In the November 2022 general election, Linda Givens was elected to fill the seat expiring in December 2023 that became vacant following the death of Julia Sparks in May 2022.

After the City Council was unable to choose a candidate at its February 2019 meeting to fill the seat expiring in December 2021 that was vacated following the resignation of Aaron Buchanan, the Republican municipal committee selected Nelson Dilg to fill the vacancy and he took office in March 2019; Dilg served on an interim basis until the November 2019 general election, when he was elected to serve the balance of the term of office.

=== Federal, state and county representation ===
Estell Manor is located in the 2nd Congressional District and is part of New Jersey's 1st state legislative district. Prior to the 2011 reapportionment following the 2010 census, Estell Manor had been in the 2nd state legislative district.

For the 119th United States Congress, New Jersey's 2nd congressional district is represented by Jeff Van Drew (R, Dennis Township). New Jersey is represented in the United States Senate by Democrats Cory Booker (Newark, term ends 2027) and Andy Kim (Moorestown, term ends 2031).

For the 2026–2027 session, the 1st legislative district of the New Jersey Legislature is represented in the State Senate by Mike Testa (R, Vineland) and in the General Assembly by Antwan McClellan (R, Ocean City) and Erik K. Simonsen (R, Lower Township).

Atlantic County is governed by a directly elected county executive and a nine-member Board of County Commissioners, responsible for legislation. The executive serves a four-year term and the commissioners are elected to staggered three-year terms, of which four are elected from the county on an at-large basis and five of the commissioners represent equally populated districts. As of 2025, Atlantic County's Executive is Dennis Levinson (R, Northfield), whose term of office ends December 31, 2027. Members of the Board of County Commissioners are:

Ernest D. Coursey (D, District 1-- Atlantic City, Egg Harbor Township (part), Longport, Margate City, and Ventnor City; 2025, Atlantic City), Chair Maureen Kern (R, District 2-- Egg Harbor Township (part), Linwood, Northfield, Somers Point and Pleasantville; 2027, Somers Point), Andrew Parker III (R, District 3-- Egg Harbor Township (part) and Hamilton Township (part); 2026, Egg Harbor Township), Richard R. Dase (R, District 4, including Brigantine, Galloway Township, Egg Harbor Township (part), and Port Republic; 2025, Galloway Township), Vice Chair James A. Bertino (R, District 5-- Buena, Buena Vista Township, Corbin City, Egg Harbor City, Estell Manor, Folsom, Hamilton Township (part), Hammonton, Mullica Township and Weymouth Township; 2027, Hammonton), June Byrnes (R, At-Large; 2026, Linwood), Michael Ruffu (R, At-Large; Margate, 2027) Amy L. Gatto (R, At-large; 2025, Hamilton Township) and John W. Risley (R, At-Large; 2026, Egg Harbor Township)

Atlantic County's constitutional officers are: Clerk Joesph J. Giralo (R, 2026, Hammonton), Sheriff Joe O'Donoghue (R, 2026, Egg Harbor Township) and Surrogate James Curcio (R, 2025, Hammonton).

=== Politics ===
As of March 23, 2011, there were a total of 1,209 registered voters in Estell Manor, of which 269 (22.2% vs. 30.5% countywide) were registered as Democrats, 388 (32.1% vs. 25.2%) were registered as Republicans and 552 (45.7% vs. 44.3%) were registered as Unaffiliated. There were no voters registered to other parties. Among the city's 2010 Census population, 69.7% (vs. 58.8% in Atlantic County) were registered to vote, including 91.5% of those ages 18 and over (vs. 76.6% countywide).

Gubernatorial election results for Estell Manor
| Year | Republican | | Democratic | | Third party(ies) | |
| Year | No. | % | No. | % | No. | % |
|---|---|---|---|---|---|---|
| 2025 | 602 | 70.08% | 251 | 29.22% | 6 | 0.70% |
| 2021 | 633 | 73.69% | 208 | 24.21% | 18 | 2.10% |
| 2017 | 374 | 57.54% | 248 | 38.15% | 28 | 4.31% |
| 2013 | 560 | 74.47% | 182 | 24.20% | 10 | 1.33% |
| 2009 | 451 | 57.16% | 264 | 33.46% | 74 | 9.38% |
| 2005 | 409 | 52.57% | 291 | 37.40% | 78 | 10.03% |

In the 2012 presidential election, Republican Mitt Romney received 525 votes in the city (57.4% vs. 41.1% countywide), ahead of Democrat Barack Obama with 368 votes (40.2% vs. 57.9%) and other candidates with 7 votes (0.8% vs. 0.9%), among the 915 ballots cast by the city's 1,249 registered voters, for a turnout of 73.3% (vs. 65.8% in Atlantic County). In the 2008 presidential election, Republican John McCain received 581 votes (59.3% vs. 41.6% countywide), ahead of Democrat Barack Obama with 385 votes (39.3% vs. 56.5%) and other candidates with 5 votes (0.5% vs. 1.1%), among the 980 ballots cast by the city's 1,302 registered voters, for a turnout of 75.3% (vs. 68.1% in Atlantic County). In the 2004 presidential election, Republican George W. Bush received 556 votes in Estell Manor (58.8% vs. 46.2% countywide), ahead of Democrat John Kerry with 373 votes (39.5% vs. 52.0%) and other candidates with 9 votes (1.0% vs. 0.8%), among the 945 ballots cast by the city's 1,210 registered voters, for a turnout of 78.1% (vs. 69.8% in the whole county).

Presidential elections results
| Year | Republican | Democratic | Third Parties |
|---|---|---|---|
| 2024 | 71.5% 780 | 27.3% 298 | 1.2% 10 |
| 2020 | 69.4% 799 | 29.3% 337 | 1.3% 15 |
| 2016 | 70.6% 619 | 25.0% 219 | 4.4% 39 |
| 2012 | 57.4% 525 | 40.2% 368 | 0.8% 7 |
| 2008 | 59.3% 581 | 39.3% 385 | 0.5% 5 |
| 2004 | 58.8% 556 | 39.5% 373 | 1.0% 9 |

In the 2013 gubernatorial election, Republican Chris Christie received 560 votes in the city (71.3% vs. 60.0% countywide), ahead of Democrat Barbara Buono with 182 votes (23.2% vs. 34.9%) and other candidates with 10 votes (1.3% vs. 1.3%), among the 785 ballots cast by the city's 1,281 registered voters, yielding a 61.3% turnout (vs. 41.5% in the county). In the 2009 gubernatorial election, Republican Chris Christie received 451 votes (54.9% vs. 47.7% countywide), ahead of Democrat Jon Corzine with 264 votes (32.2% vs. 44.5%), Independent Chris Daggett with 51 votes (6.2% vs. 4.8%) and other candidates with 23 votes (2.8% vs. 1.2%), among the 821 ballots cast by the city's 1,252 registered voters, yielding a 65.6% turnout (vs. 44.9% in the county).

United States Senate election results for Estell Manor1
| Year | Republican | | Democratic | | Third party(ies) | |
| Year | No. | % | No. | % | No. | % |
|---|---|---|---|---|---|---|
| 2024 | 726 | 69.54% | 297 | 28.45% | 21 | 2.01% |
| 2018 | 526 | 70.70% | 191 | 25.67% | 27 | 3.63% |
| 2012 | 457 | 54.60% | 363 | 43.37% | 17 | 2.03% |
| 2006 | 371 | 53.30% | 305 | 43.82% | 20 | 2.87% |

United States Senate election results for Estell Manor2
| Year | Republican | | Democratic | | Third party(ies) | |
| Year | No. | % | No. | % | No. | % |
|---|---|---|---|---|---|---|
| 2020 | 769 | 69.15% | 331 | 29.77% | 12 | 1.08% |
| 2014 | 345 | 62.27% | 187 | 33.75% | 22 | 3.97% |
| 2013 | 262 | 69.31% | 108 | 28.57% | 8 | 2.12% |
| 2008 | 487 | 54.66% | 379 | 42.54% | 25 | 2.81% |

== Education ==
Public school students in kindergarten through eighth grade attend the Estell Manor School District at Estell Manor Elementary School. As of the 2021–22 school year, the district, comprised of one school, had an enrollment of 181 students and 16.0 classroom teachers (on an FTE basis), for a student–teacher ratio of 11.3:1. In the 2016–2017 school year, Estell Manor was the 36th-smallest enrollment of any school district in the state, with 172 students.

For ninth through twelfth grades, public school students attend Buena Regional High School, which serves students from Buena Borough and Buena Vista Township, together with students from Estell Manor City and Weymouth Township who attend the school as part of sending/receiving relationships with the Buena Regional School District. As of the 2021–22 school year, the high school had an enrollment of 498 students and 48.0 classroom teachers (on an FTE basis), for a student–teacher ratio of 10.4:1.

City public school students are also eligible to attend the Atlantic County Institute of Technology in the Mays Landing section of Hamilton Township or the Charter-Tech High School for the Performing Arts, located in Somers Point.

== Transportation ==
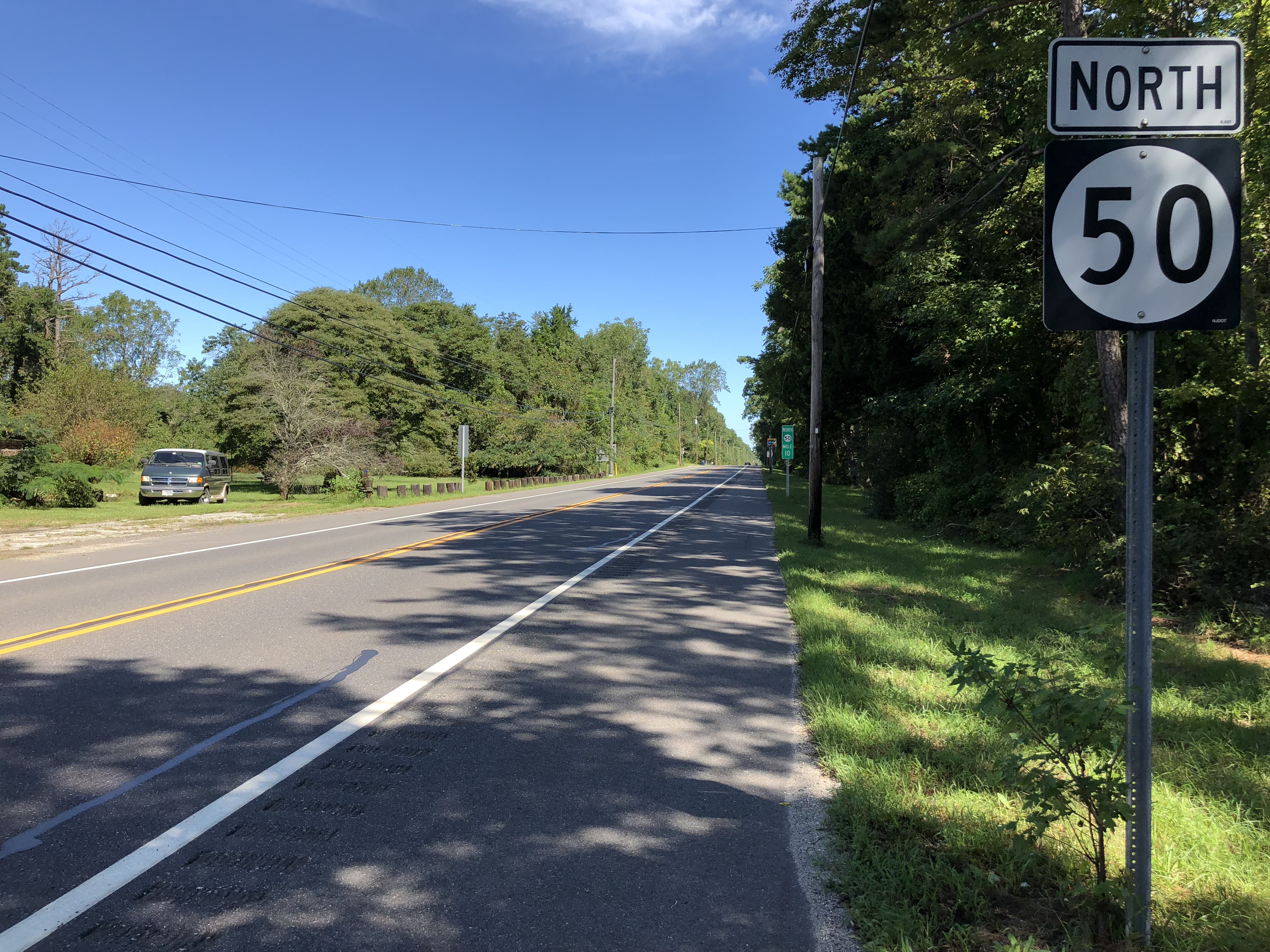
Route 50 northbound in Estell Manor

=== Roads and highways ===
As of May 2010, the city had a total of 56.55 miles (91.01 km) of roadways, of which 26.07 miles (41.96 km) were maintained by the municipality, 19.97 miles (32.14 km) by Atlantic County and 10.51 miles (16.91 km) by the New Jersey Department of Transportation.

Route 49 and Route 50 both pass through Estell Manor, as do County Route 557, County Route 649 and County Route 666.

=== Public transportation ===
NJ Transit provides bus service on the 315 route that runs between Cape May and Philadelphia.
