= Weymouth Township, New Jersey =

Township in Atlantic County, New Jersey, US

- Township
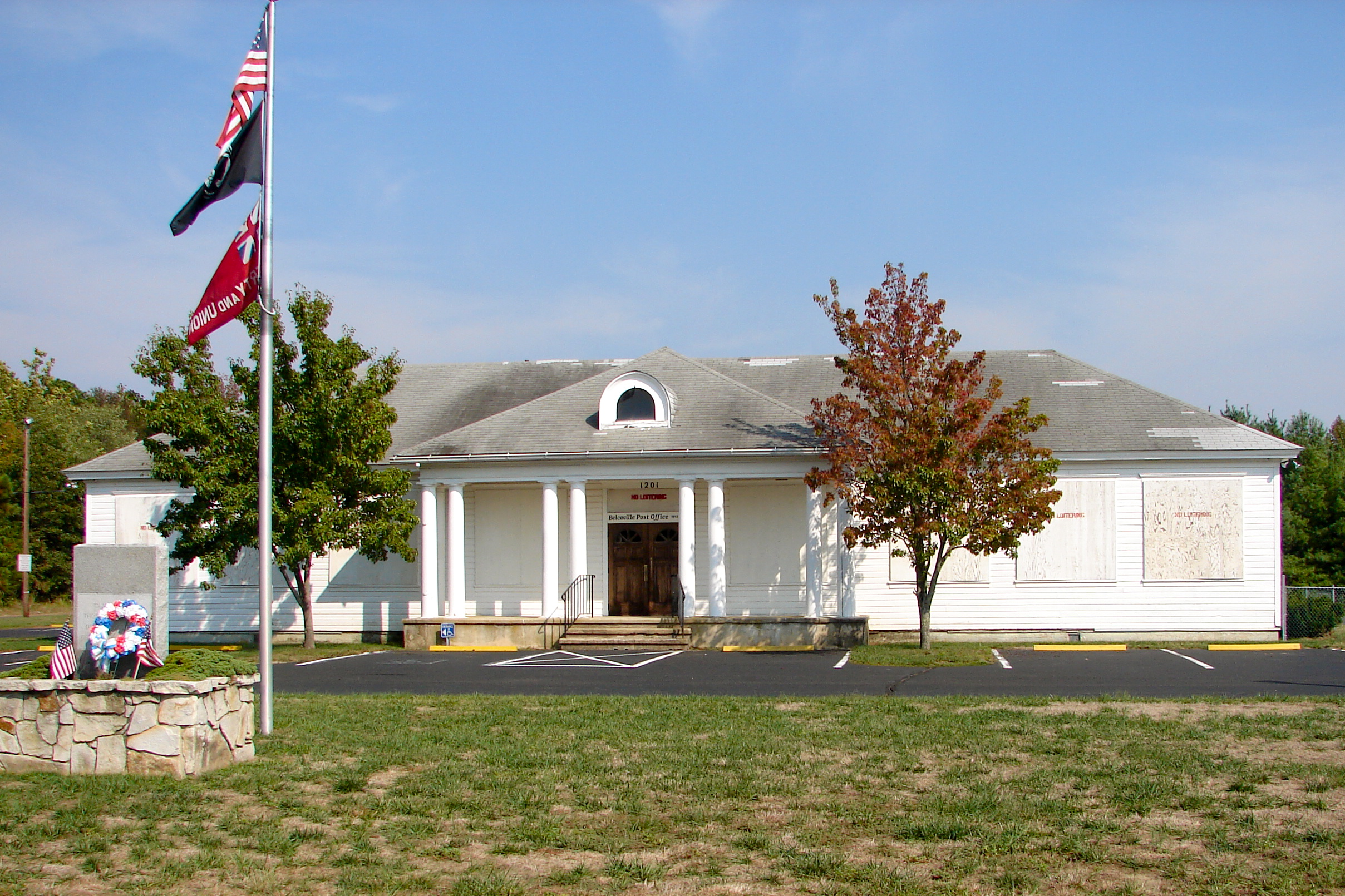
- Belcoville Post Office

- Flag logo

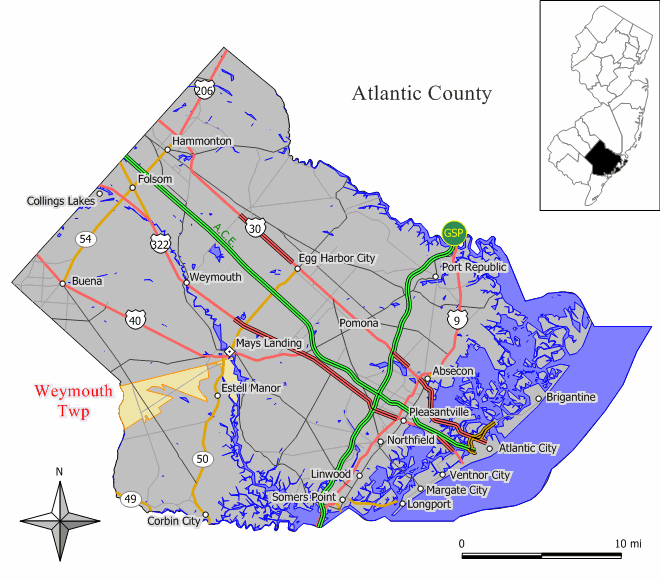
- Map of Weymouth Township in Atlantic County. Inset: Location of Atlantic County highlighted in the State of New Jersey.

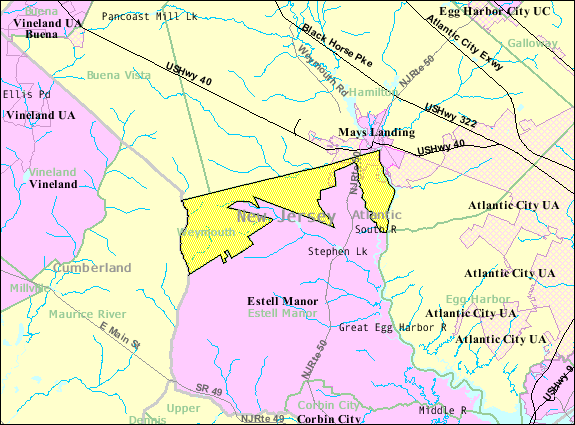
- Census Bureau map of Weymouth Township, New Jersey

- Location in Atlantic County Location in New Jersey Location in the United States
- Coordinates: 39.39633°N 74.826955°W
- Country: United States
- State: New Jersey
- County: Atlantic
- Incorporated: February 21, 1798
- Named for: Weymouth, Dorset

Government
  - Type: Township
  - Body: Township Committee
  - Mayor: Kenneth R. Haeser (R, term ends December 31, 2023)
  - Municipal clerk: Dorothy-Jo Ayres

Area
  - Total: 12.17 sq mi (31.52 km^{2})
  - Land: 11.82 sq mi (30.62 km^{2})
  - Water: 0.35 sq mi (0.90 km^{2}) 2.84%
  - Rank: 188th of 565 in state 9th of 23 in county
- Elevation: 75 ft (23 m)

Population (2020)
  - Total: 2,614
  - Estimate (2023): 2,642
  - Rank: 463rd of 565 in state 18th of 23 in county
  - Density: 221.1/sq mi (85.4/km^{2})
  - Rank: 497th of 565 in state 17th of 23 in county
- Time zone: UTC−05:00 (Eastern (EST))
  - Summer (DST): UTC−04:00 (Eastern (EDT))
- ZIP Code: 08330 – Mays Landing
- Area code: 609 exchanges: 476, 625, 909
- FIPS code: 3400180330
- GNIS feature ID: 0882050
- Website: www.weymouthnj.org

Weymouth Township is a township in Atlantic County, in the U.S. state of New Jersey. As of the 2020 United States census, the township's population was 2,614, a decrease of 101 (−3.7%) from the 2010 census count of 2,715, which in turn reflected an increase of 458 (+20.3%) from the 2,257 counted in the 2000 census.

Named for Weymouth, Dorset, the township was created as a constablewick in 1694 and was known in its early days as "New Waymouth Township". Weymouth Township was incorporated by an act of the New Jersey Legislature on February 12, 1798, from portions of Egg Harbor Township, while the area was still part of Gloucester County, and was incorporated nine days later. Portions of the township were taken on February 5, 1813, to create Hamilton Township. Weymouth Township became part of the newly created Atlantic County on February 7, 1837. Portions of the township were taken on March 11, 1922, to form Corbin City, and on March 14, 1925, to form Estell Manor.

Geographically, the township, and all of Atlantic County, is part of the South Jersey region of the state and of the Atlantic City-Hammonton metropolitan statistical area, which in turn is included in the Philadelphia metropolitan area.

== Geography ==
According to the United States Census Bureau, the township had a total area of 12.17 square miles (31.52 km^{2}), including 11.82 square miles (30.62 km^{2}) of land and 0.35 square miles (0.90 km^{2}) of water (2.84%).

Unincorporated communities, localities and place names located partially or completely within the township include Belcoville, Dorothy, Grassy Pond and High Bank Landing.

The township borders the municipalities of Buena Vista Township, Egg Harbor Township, Estell Manor and Hamilton Township in Atlantic County; and Maurice River Township in Cumberland County.

The township is one of 56 South Jersey municipalities that are included within the New Jersey Pinelands National Reserve, a protected natural area of unique ecology covering 1,100,000 acres (450,000 ha), that has been classified as a United States Biosphere Reserve and established by Congress in 1978 as the nation's first National Reserve. Part of the township is included in the state-designated Pinelands Area, which includes portions of Atlantic County, along with areas in Burlington, Camden, Cape May, Cumberland, Gloucester and Ocean counties.

== Demographics ==
Historical population
Census	Pop.	Note	%±
1810	1,029		—
1820	787	*	−23.5%
1830	1,270		61.4%
1840	1,158		−8.8%
1850	1,032		−10.9%
1860	823		−20.3%
1870	810		−1.6%
1880	741		−8.5%
1890	538		−27.4%
1900	972		80.7%
1910	899		−7.5%
1920	1,166		29.7%
1930	685	*	−41.3%
1940	675		−1.5%
1950	750		11.1%
1960	788		5.1%
1970	998		26.6%
1980	1,260		26.3%
1990	1,957		55.3%
2000	2,257		15.3%
2010	2,715		20.3%
2020	2,614		−3.7%
2023 (est.)	2,642		1.1%
Population sources: 1810–1830 1840–2000; 1810–1920 1840 1850–1870; 1850 1870 1880–1890; 1890–1910 1910–1930; 1940–2000 2000; 2010 2020 * = Lost territory in previous decade.

=== 2010 census ===
The 2010 United States census counted 2,715 people, 1,153 households, and 762 families in the township. The population density was 224.6 per square mile (86.7/km^{2}). There were 1,220 housing units at an average density of 100.9 per square mile (39.0/km^{2}). The racial makeup was 92.04% (2,499) White, 4.75% (129) Black or African American, 0.22% (6) Native American, 0.88% (24) Asian, 0.07% (2) Pacific Islander, 0.66% (18) from other races, and 1.36% (37) from two or more races. Hispanic or Latino of any race were 4.57% (124) of the population.

Of the 1,153 households, 19.3% had children under the age of 18; 52.4% were married couples living together; 9.5% had a female householder with no husband present and 33.9% were non-families. Of all households, 28.9% were made up of individuals and 17.0% had someone living alone who was 65 years of age or older. The average household size was 2.35 and the average family size was 2.87.

17.2% of the population were under the age of 18, 6.9% from 18 to 24, 18.3% from 25 to 44, 30.5% from 45 to 64, and 27.1% who were 65 years of age or older. The median age was 49.8 years. For every 100 females, the population had 94.8 males. For every 100 females ages 18 and older there were 92.6 males.

The Census Bureau's 2006–2010 American Community Survey showed that (in 2010 inflation-adjusted dollars) median household income was $51,574 (with a margin of error of +/− $7,234) and the median family income was $67,857 (+/− $5,235). Males had a median income of $59,688 (+/− $4,165) versus $38,438 (+/− $5,634) for females. The per capita income for the borough was $28,857 (+/− $3,096). About 5.7% of families and 8.0% of the population were below the poverty line, including 16.1% of those under age 18 and 5.9% of those age 65 or over.

=== 2000 census ===
As of the 2000 United States census there were 2,257 people, 851 households, and 623 families residing in the township. The population density was 185.0 inhabitants per square mile (71.4/km^{2}). There were 909 housing units at an average density of 74.5 per square mile (28.8/km^{2}). The racial makeup of the township was 91.98% White, 4.79% African American, 0.40% Native American, 0.80% Asian, 1.02% from other races, and 1.02% from two or more races. Hispanic or Latino of any race were 3.81% of the population.

There were 851 households, out of which 30.1% had children under the age of 18 living with them, 56.6% were married couples living together, 10.3% had a female householder with no husband present, and 26.7% were non-families. 21.5% of all households were made up of individuals, and 9.6% had someone living alone who was 65 years of age or older. The average household size was 2.65 and the average family size was 3.06.

In the township the population was spread out, with 24.9% under the age of 18, 6.2% from 18 to 24, 28.9% from 25 to 44, 22.7% from 45 to 64, and 17.1% who were 65 years of age or older. The median age was 39 years. For every 100 females, there were 92.6 males. For every 100 females age 18 and over, there were 90.6 males.

The median income for a household in the township was $45,882, and the median income for a family was $49,800. Males had a median income of $41,842 versus $29,464 for females. The per capita income for the township was $18,987. About 4.7% of families and 5.1% of the population were below the poverty line, including 4.2% of those under age 18 and 12.0% of those age 65 or over.

== Government ==
=== Local government ===
Weymouth Township operates under the Township form of New Jersey municipal government, one of 141 municipalities (of the 564) statewide that use this form, the second-most commonly used form of government in the state. The Township Committee is comprised of three members, who are elected directly by the voters at-large in partisan elections to serve three-year terms of office on a staggered basis, with one seat coming up for election each year as part of the November general election in a three-year cycle.

As of 2023, members of the Weymouth Township Committee are Mayor Kenneth R. Haeser (R, term on committee ends December 31, 2024; term as mayor ends 2022), Carl "Peter" Keiffenheim (R, 2023) and Edward G. Norton (R, 2025).

Republican Sean O'Brikis resigned from the Township Committee in October 2010 and then had to resign again after winning re-election unopposed in the November election. The committee selected Kenneth Haeser to fill the vacant seat, though Haeser lost to Democrat Dennis Doyle in the November 2011 general election to fill the balance of the term vacated by O'Brikis.

=== Federal, state and county representation ===
Weymouth is located in the 2nd Congressional District and is part of New Jersey's 1st state legislative district.

For the 119th United States Congress, New Jersey's 2nd congressional district is represented by Jeff Van Drew (R, Dennis Township). New Jersey is represented in the United States Senate by Democrats Cory Booker (Newark, term ends 2027) and Andy Kim (Moorestown, term ends 2031).

For the 2026–2027 session, the 1st legislative district of the New Jersey Legislature is represented in the State Senate by Mike Testa (R, Vineland) and in the General Assembly by Antwan McClellan (R, Ocean City) and Erik K. Simonsen (R, Lower Township).

Atlantic County is governed by a directly elected county executive and a nine-member Board of County Commissioners, responsible for legislation. The executive serves a four-year term and the commissioners are elected to staggered three-year terms, of which four are elected from the county on an at-large basis and five of the commissioners represent equally populated districts. As of 2025, Atlantic County's Executive is Dennis Levinson (R, Northfield), whose term of office ends December 31, 2027. Members of the Board of County Commissioners are:

Ernest D. Coursey (D, District 1-- Atlantic City, Egg Harbor Township (part), Longport, Margate City, and Ventnor City; 2025, Atlantic City), Chair Maureen Kern (R, District 2-- Egg Harbor Township (part), Linwood, Northfield, Somers Point and Pleasantville; 2027, Somers Point), Andrew Parker III (R, District 3-- Egg Harbor Township (part) and Hamilton Township (part); 2026, Egg Harbor Township), Richard R. Dase (R, District 4, including Brigantine, Galloway Township, Egg Harbor Township (part), and Port Republic; 2025, Galloway Township), Vice Chair James A. Bertino (R, District 5-- Buena, Buena Vista Township, Corbin City, Egg Harbor City, Estell Manor, Folsom, Hamilton Township (part), Hammonton, Mullica Township and Weymouth Township; 2027, Hammonton), June Byrnes (R, At-Large; 2026, Linwood), Michael Ruffu (R, At-Large; Margate, 2027) Amy L. Gatto (R, At-large; 2025, Hamilton Township) and John W. Risley (R, At-Large; 2026, Egg Harbor Township)

Atlantic County's constitutional officers are: Clerk Joesph J. Giralo (R, 2026, Hammonton), Sheriff Joe O'Donoghue (R, 2026, Egg Harbor Township) and Surrogate James Curcio (R, 2025, Hammonton).

=== Politics ===
As of March 2011, there were a total of 1,785 registered voters in Weymouth Township, of which 456 (25.5% vs. 30.5% countywide) were registered as Democrats, 610 (34.2% vs. 25.2%) were registered as Republicans and 719 (40.3% vs. 44.3%) were registered as Unaffiliated. There were no voters registered to other parties. Among the township's 2010 Census population, 65.7% (vs. 58.8% in Atlantic County) were registered to vote, including 79.4% of those ages 18 and over (vs. 76.6% countywide).

Gubernatorial election results for Weymouth Township
Year	Republican		Democratic		Third party(ies)	
Year	No.	%	No.	%	No.	%
2025	772	56.68%	580	42.58%	10	0.73%
2021	716	62.70%	415	36.34%	11	0.96%
2017	440	53.46%	369	44.84%	14	1.70%
2013	695	71.72%	258	26.63%	16	1.65%
2009	571	54.59%	387	37.00%	88	8.41%
2005	432	48.87%	406	45.93%	46	5.20%

In the 2012 presidential election, Republican Mitt Romney received 701 votes (51.1% vs. 41.1% countywide), ahead of Democrat Barack Obama with 650 votes (47.4% vs. 57.9%) and other candidates with 9 votes (0.7% vs. 0.9%), among the 1,371 ballots cast by the township's 1,856 registered voters, for a turnout of 73.9% (vs. 65.8% in Atlantic County). In the 2008 presidential election, Republican John McCain received 777 votes (52.7% vs. 41.6% countywide), ahead of Democrat Barack Obama with 645 votes (43.8% vs. 56.5%) and other candidates with 31 votes (2.1% vs. 1.1%), among the 1,474 ballots cast by the township's 1,896 registered voters, for a turnout of 77.7% (vs. 68.1% in Atlantic County). In the 2004 presidential election, Republican George W. Bush received 636 votes (51.0% vs. 46.2% countywide), ahead of Democrat John Kerry with 588 votes (47.2% vs. 52.0%) and other candidates with 11 votes (0.9% vs. 0.8%), among the 1,246 ballots cast by the township's 1,623 registered voters, for a turnout of 76.8% (vs. 69.8% in the whole county).

Presidential elections results
Year	Republican	Democratic	Third Parties
2024	59.8% 1,032	38.0% 656	2.2% 35
2020	60.2% 1,040	38.7% 668	1.1% 19
2016	58.8% 774	37.4% 492	3.8% 50
2012	51.1% 701	47.4% 650	0.7% 9
2008	52.7% 777	43.8% 645	2.1% 31
2004	51.0% 636	47.2% 588	0.9% 11

In the 2013 gubernatorial election, Republican Chris Christie received 695 votes (70.0% vs. 60.0% countywide), ahead of Democrat Barbara Buono with 258 votes (26.0% vs. 34.9%) and other candidates with 16 votes (1.6% vs. 1.3%), among the 993 ballots cast by the township's 1,890 registered voters, yielding a 52.5% turnout (vs. 41.5% in the county). In the 2009 gubernatorial election, Republican Chris Christie received 571 votes (53.3% vs. 47.7% countywide), ahead of Democrat Jon Corzine with 387 votes (36.1% vs. 44.5%), Independent Chris Daggett with 66 votes (6.2% vs. 4.8%) and other candidates with 22 votes (2.1% vs. 1.2%), among the 1,071 ballots cast by the township's 1,835 registered voters, yielding a 58.4% turnout (vs. 44.9% in the county).

United States Senate election results for Weymouth Township1
Year	Republican		Democratic		Third party(ies)	
Year	No.	%	No.	%	No.	%
2024	982	59.30%	647	39.07%	27	1.63%
2018	668	61.57%	380	35.02%	37	3.41%
2012	615	48.35%	636	50.00%	21	1.65%
2006	488	50.10%	456	46.82%	30	3.08%

United States Senate election results for Weymouth Township2
Year	Republican		Democratic		Third party(ies)	
Year	No.	%	No.	%	No.	%
2020	986	58.83%	670	39.98%	20	1.19%
2014	515	56.10%	379	41.29%	24	2.61%
2013	329	57.82%	220	38.66%	20	3.51%
2008	687	50.59%	647	47.64%	24	1.77%

== Education ==
The Weymouth Township School District serves public school students in pre-kindergarten through eighth grade at Weymouth Township School. As of the 2022–23 school year, the district, comprised of one school, had an enrollment of 161 students and 16.7 classroom teachers (on an FTE basis), for a student–teacher ratio of 9.6:1. In the 2016–17 school year, Weymouth was tied with the 30th smallest enrollment of any school district in the state, with 155 students.

For ninth through twelfth grades, public school students attend Buena Regional High School as part of a sending/receiving relationship with the Buena Regional School District. Students attend the high school from Buena and Buena Vista Township, along with students from Estell Manor, who attend as part of a sending/receiving relationship. As of the 2022–23 school year, the high school had an enrollment of 496 students and 44.6 classroom teachers (on an FTE basis), for a student–teacher ratio of 11.1:1.

Township public school students are also eligible to attend the Atlantic County Institute of Technology in the Mays Landing section of Hamilton Township or the Charter-Tech High School for the Performing Arts, located in Somers Point.

== Transportation ==
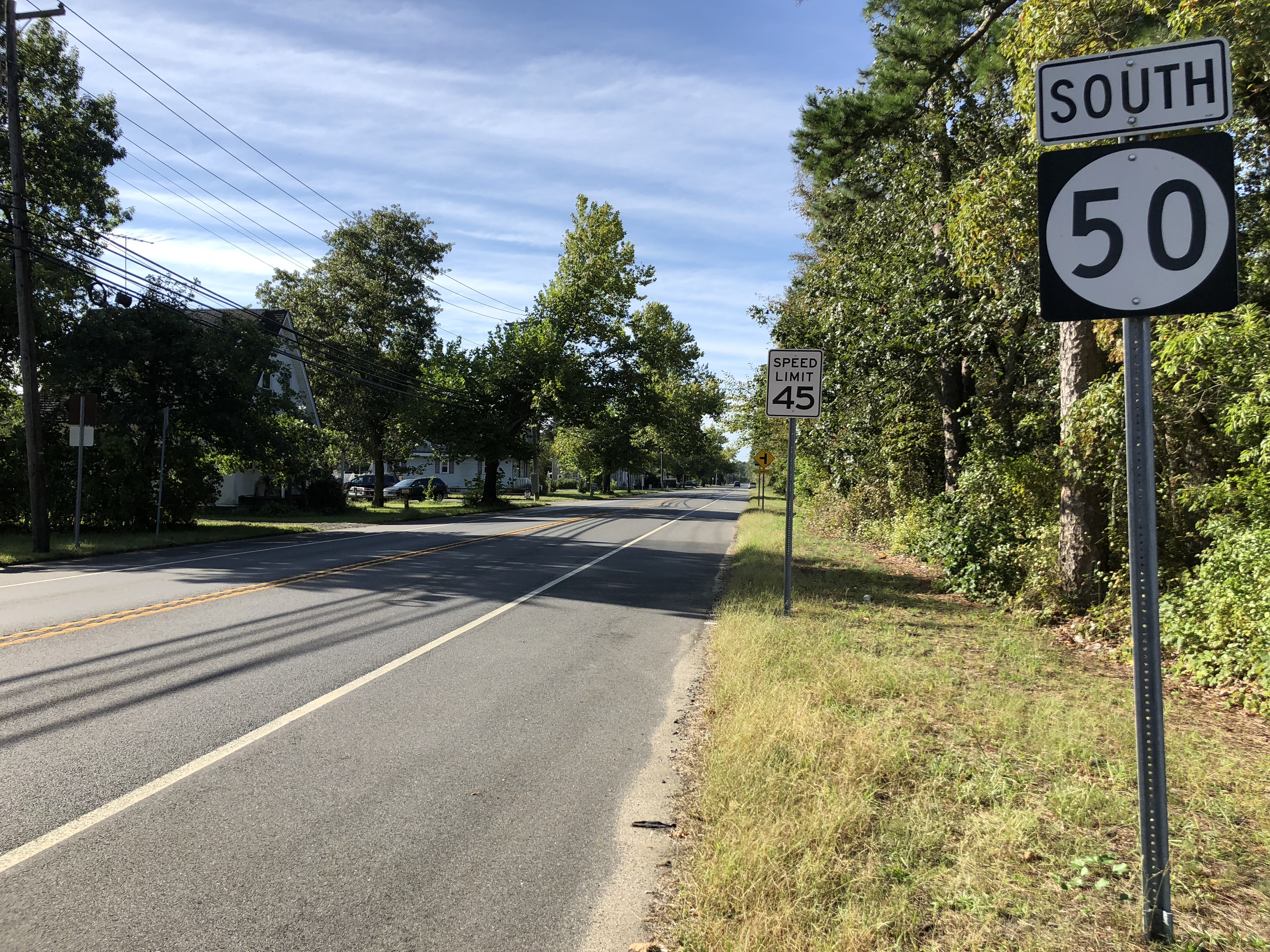
Route 50 southbound in Weymouth Township

=== Roads and highways ===
As of May 2010, the township had a total of 36.90 miles (59.38 km) of roadways, of which 26.02 miles (41.88 km) were maintained by the municipality, 9.80 miles (15.77 km) by Atlantic County and 1.08 miles (1.74 km) by the New Jersey Department of Transportation.

New Jersey Route 50 (Boulevard) is the main highway serving Weymouth Township.

=== Public transportation ===
NJ Transit provides bus service in the township on the 315 route that runs between Cape May and Philadelphia.

== Notable people ==
People who were born in, residents of, or otherwise closely associated with Weymouth Township include:

- Frances Edelstein (1926–2018), businesswoman who ran the Cafe Edison in New York City's Theater District, together with her husband
- Harry Edelstein (1917–2009), Holocaust survivor and restaurateur known for running what was called the Polish Tea House
- Kathleen Karr (1946–2017), author of historical novels for children and young adults
- Walter Lowenfels (1897–1976), poet, journalist and member of the Communist Party USA who edited the communist newspaper the Daily Worker
- William Moore (1810–1878), served in the United States House of Representatives, where he represented New Jersey's 1st congressional district from 1867 to 1871
- Rhoda Scott (born 1938), soul jazz organist and singer
