= Belcoville Post Office =

- U.S. National Register of Historic Places
- New Jersey Register of Historic Places
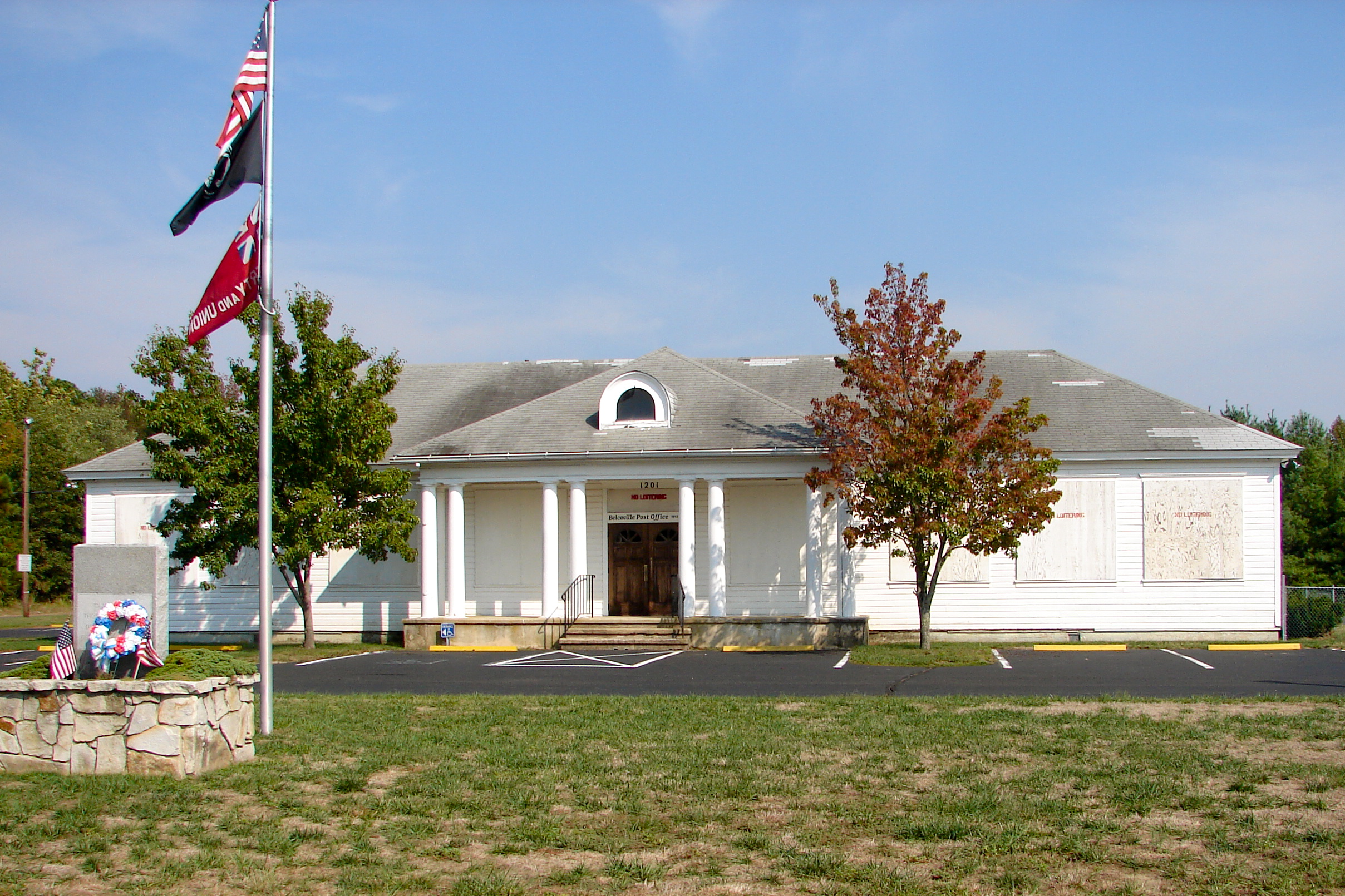

- Location within Atlantic County, New Jersey Location within New Jersey Location within the United States
- Location: 1201 Madden Avenue, Weymouth Township, New Jersey
- Coordinates: 39.4371°N 74.7334°W
- Area: 2 acres (0.81 ha)
- Built: 1918
- Architect: Vivian B. Smith
- Architectural style: Classical Revival
- NRHP reference No.: 08000174
- NJRHP No.: 4190

Significant dates
- Added to NRHP: March 14, 2008
- Designated NJRHP: December 21, 2007

Belcoville Post Office is located in the Belcoville section of Weymouth Township, Atlantic County, New Jersey, United States. The building was built in 1918 and added to the National Register of Historic Places on March 14, 2008.

== See also ==
- National Register of Historic Places listings in Atlantic County, New Jersey
