= Belcoville, New Jersey =

Populated place in Atlantic County, New Jersey, US

- Unincorporated community
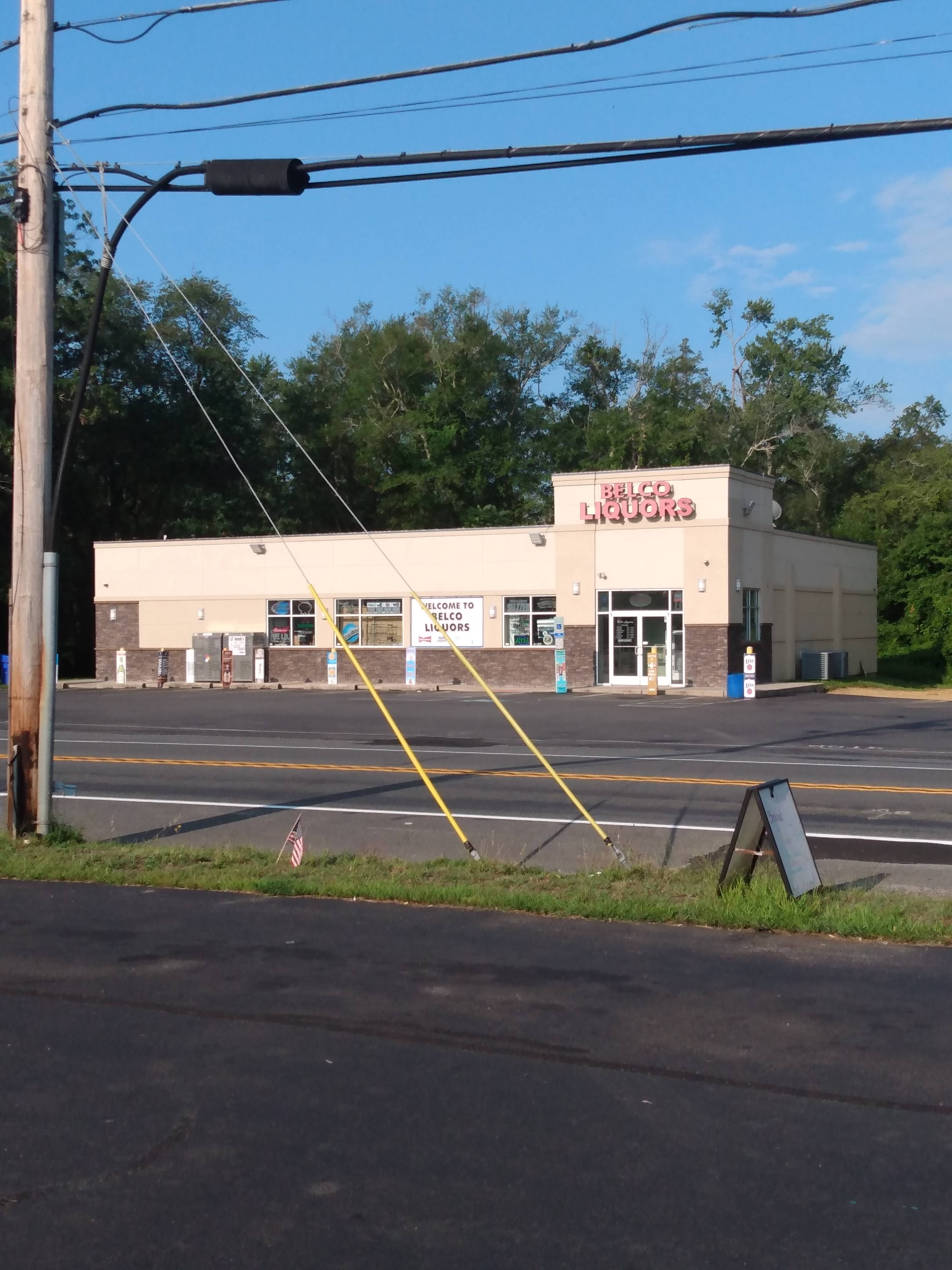
- Belco Liqours in Belcoville

- Location within Atlantic County. Inset: Location of Atlantic County within New Jersey. Belcoville (New Jersey) Belcoville (the United States)
- Coordinates: 39°26′14″N 74°44′10″W
- Country: United States
- State: New Jersey
- County: Atlantic
- Township: Weymouth
- Elevation: 9.8 ft (3 m)
- Time zone: UTC−05:00 (Eastern (EST))
  - Summer (DST): UTC−04:00 (EDT)
- Area code: 609
- GNIS feature ID: 874643

Belcoville is an unincorporated community located within Weymouth Township, in Atlantic County, in the U.S. state of New Jersey.

The town was founded in March 1918, during World War I to provide housing for the nearby Bethlehem Loading Company munitions plant. A town hall, school, bank, bowling alley, and several types of stores were created by August. The facility continued production until 1919, after the war had ended, and was subsequently torn down and scrapped. Belcoville had a population of almost 10,000 at its peak. The land was purchased by the Mays Landing Water Company after the facility was demolished. In 1923, a church and fire company were founded.

== See also ==
- Belcoville Post Office
