= Marmora, New Jersey =

Populated place in Cape May County, New Jersey, US

- Census-designated place
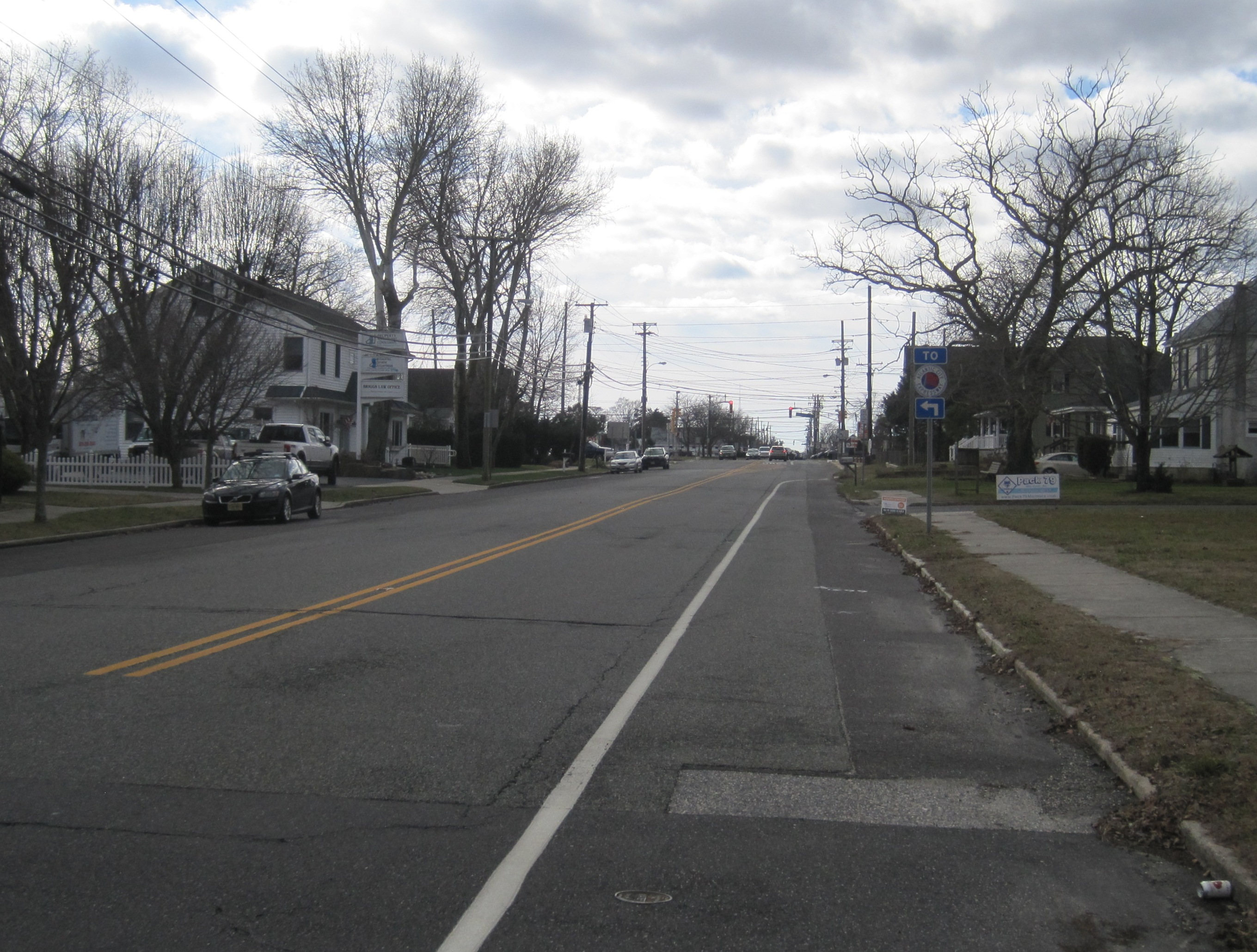
- View along Shore Road (US 9) southbound at Roosevelt Boulevard (CR 623)

- Location in Cape May County Location in New Jersey Location in the United States
- Coordinates: 39°16′00″N 74°38′42″W
- Country: United States
- State: New Jersey
- County: Cape May
- Township: Upper

Area
  - Total: 2.02 sq mi (5.22 km^{2})
  - Land: 2.01 sq mi (5.20 km^{2})
  - Water: 0.0077 sq mi (0.02 km^{2})
- Elevation: 23 ft (7 m)

Population (2020)
  - Total: 2,413
  - Density: 1,201.4/sq mi (463.88/km^{2})
- ZIP Code: 08223
- FIPS code: 34-44280
- GNIS feature ID: 0878138

Marmora is an unincorporated community and census-designated place (CDP) in Upper Township, in Cape May County, in the U.S. state of New Jersey. It is part of the Ocean City Metropolitan Statistical Area. Its postal ZIP Code is 08223. As of the 2020 census, Marmora had a population of 2,413.

A post office was established in 1890, with James Corson as the first postmaster.

== Demographics ==
Historical population
Census	Pop.	Note	%±
2020	2,413		—
U.S. Decennial Census; 2020

Marmora was first listed as a census designated place in the 2020 U.S. census.

=== 2020 census ===
As of the 2020 census, Marmora had a population of 2,413. The median age was 46.6 years. 19.3% of residents were under the age of 18 and 22.4% were 65 years of age or older. For every 100 females there were 93.3 males, and for every 100 females age 18 and over there were 89.4 males age 18 and over.

100.0% of residents lived in urban areas, while 0.0% lived in rural areas.

There were 991 households in Marmora, of which 29.6% had children under the age of 18 living in them. Of all households, 59.7% were married-couple households, 12.3% were households with a male householder and no spouse or partner present, and 23.3% were households with a female householder and no spouse or partner present. About 22.5% of all households were made up of individuals and 13.0% had someone living alone who was 65 years of age or older.

There were 1,375 housing units, of which 27.9% were vacant. The homeowner vacancy rate was 2.0% and the rental vacancy rate was 7.8%.

Marmora CDP, New Jersey – Racial and ethnic composition Note: the US Census treats Hispanic/Latino as an ethnic category. This table excludes Latinos from the racial categories and assigns them to a separate category. Hispanics/Latinos may be of any race.
Race / Ethnicity (NH = Non-Hispanic)	Pop 2020	2020
White alone (NH)	2,226	92.25%
Black or African American alone (NH)	28	1.16%
Native American or Alaska Native alone (NH)	4	0.17%
Asian alone (NH)	19	0.79%
Native Hawaiian or Pacific Islander alone (NH)	1	0.04%
Other race alone (NH)	12	0.50%
Mixed race or Multiracial (NH)	63	2.61%
Hispanic or Latino (any race)	60	2.49%
Total	2,413	100.00%

== Education ==
Upper Township School District operates public schools for K-8. Upper Township Primary School and Upper Township Elementary School have Marmora addresses while Upper Township Middle School has a Petersburg address. Ocean City High School of Ocean City School District has high school students from Upper Township.

Countywide schools include Cape May County Technical High School and Cape May County Special Services School District.

The Roman Catholic Diocese of Camden operates Bishop McHugh Regional School, a Catholic K-8 school, in Ocean View, Dennis Township, which has a Cape May Courthouse postal address. It is the parish school of Marmora/Woodbine Catholic Church and three other churches.
