= Petersburg, Cape May County, New Jersey =

Populated place in Cape May County, New Jersey, US

Petersburg, New Jersey
- Unincorporated community
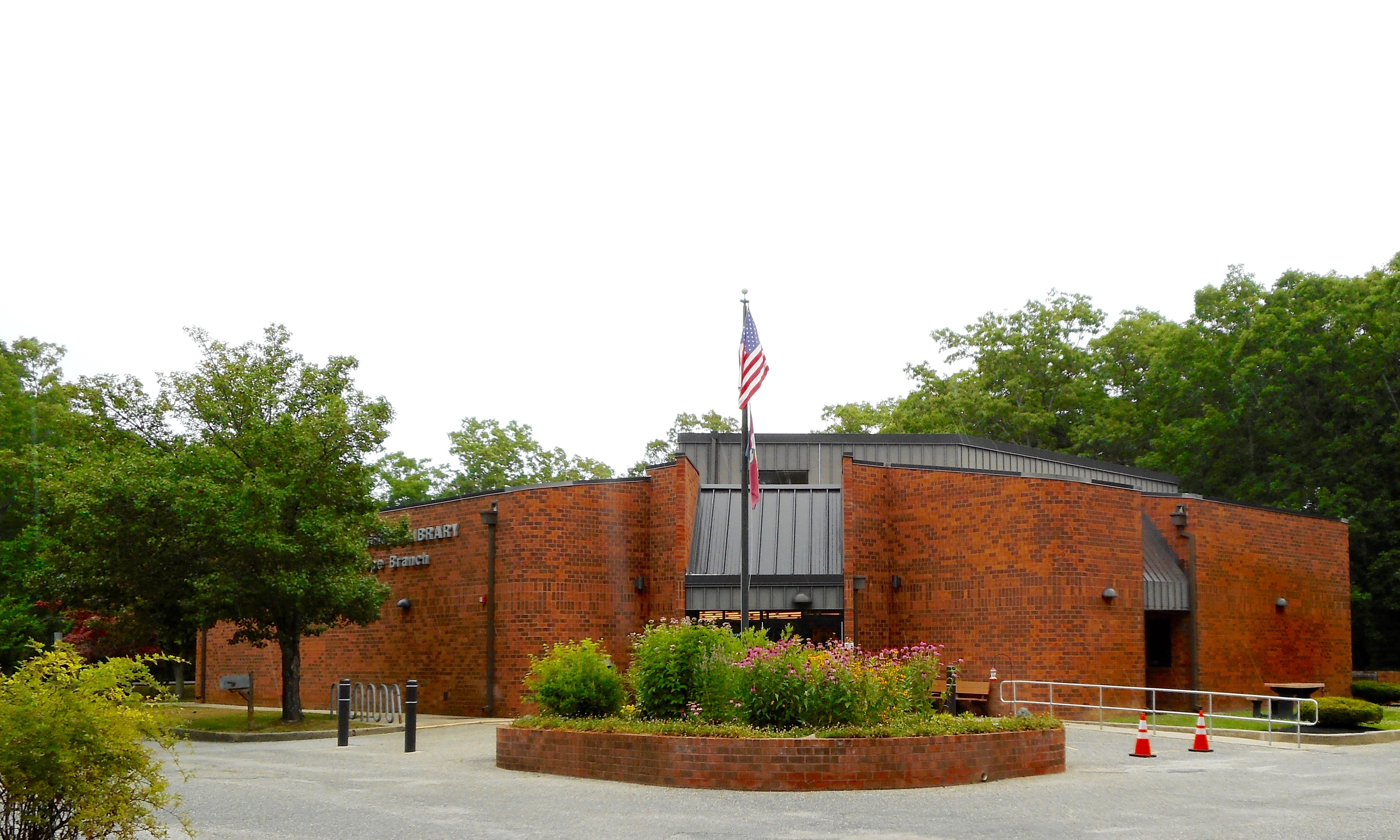
- Upper Township branch of Cape May County Library

- Location of Petersburg in Cape May County Inset: Location of county within the state of New Jersey Petersburg, New Jersey (New Jersey) Petersburg, New Jersey (the United States)
- Coordinates: 39.2537259°N 74.7265512°W
- Country: United States
- State: New Jersey
- County: Cape May
- Township: Upper
- Elevation: 33 ft (10 m)
- Time zone: UTC−05:00 (Eastern (EST))
  - Summer (DST): UTC−04:00 (Eastern (EDT))
- Area codes: 609, 640
- GNIS feature ID: 879255

Petersburg is an unincorporated community located within Upper Township in Cape May County, in the U.S. state of New Jersey.

A post office was established in 1856, with Peter Corson as the first postmaster.

== Education ==
Upper Township School District operates public schools for K-8. Upper Township Primary School and Upper Township Elementary School have Marmora addresses while Upper Township Middle School has a Petersburg address. Ocean City High School of Ocean City School District has high school students from Upper Township.

Countywide schools include Cape May County Technical High School and Cape May County Special Services School District.

Cape May County Library operates the Upper Township Branch in Petersburg.

== Notable people ==
People who were born in, residents of, or otherwise closely associated with Petersburg include:

- Dummy Stephenson (1869-1924), outfielder in Major League Baseball who played for the Philadelphia Phillies in 1892.
- Adam Williamson (born 1984), professional soccer midfielder who has played for the Ocean City Barons in the USL Premier Development League.
