= Upper Township School District =

Public school district in Cape May County, New Jersey, US

Address
- 525 Perry Road Petersburg, Cape May County, New Jersey, 08270; United States
- Coordinates: 39.259286°N 74.733393°W

District information
- Grades: PreK-8
- Superintendent: Allison J. Pessolano
- Business administrator: Laurie Ryan
- Schools: 3

Students and staff
- Enrollment: 1,378 (as of 2023–24)
- Faculty: 117.9 FTEs
- Student–teacher ratio: 11.7:1

Other information
- District Factor Group: FG
- Website: www.upperschools.org
Ind.	Per pupil	District spending	Rank (*)	K-8 average	%± vs. average
1A	Total Spending	$17,115	40	$18,891	−9.4%
1	Budgetary Cost	14,748	54	14,159	4.2%
2	Classroom Instruction	8,847	53	8,659	2.2%
6	Support Services	2,138	48	2,167	−1.3%
8	Administrative Cost	1,717	62	1,547	11.0%
10	Operations & Maintenance	1,947	73	1,612	20.8%
13	Extracurricular Activities	65	19	104	−37.5%
16	Median Teacher Salary	61,069	43	61,136
Data from NJDoE 2014 Taxpayers' Guide to Education Spending. *Of K-8 districts with more than 750 students. Lowest spending=1; Highest=84

The Upper Township School District is a comprehensive community public school district, serving students in pre-kindergarten through eighth grade from Upper Township, in Cape May County, in the U.S. state of New Jersey. Students from Corbin City, a non-operating district, attend the district's schools as part of a sending/receiving relationship.

As of the 2023–24 school year, the district, comprised of three schools, had an enrollment of 1,378 students and 117.9 classroom teachers (on an FTE basis), for a student–teacher ratio of 11.7:1.

The district had been classified by the New Jersey Department of Education as being in District Factor Group "FG", the fourth-highest of eight groupings. District Factor Groups organize districts statewide to allow comparison by common socioeconomic characteristics of the local districts. From lowest socioeconomic status to highest, the categories are A, B, CD, DE, FG, GH, I and J.

Students in public school for ninth through twelfth grades from Upper Township attend Ocean City High School in Ocean City as part of a sending/receiving relationship with the Ocean City School District, along with students from Corbin City, Longport and Sea Isle City. As of the 2023–24 school year, the high school had an enrollment of 1,190 students and 126.4 classroom teachers (on an FTE basis), for a student–teacher ratio of 9.4:1. In 2023, more than half of students in Ocean City High School were from Upper Township.

== Schools ==
Schools in the district (with 2023–24 enrollment data from the National Center for Education Statistics) are:

Elementary schools

- Upper Township Primary School with 479 students in grades PreK-2
  - Jamie Gillespie, principal
- Upper Township Elementary School with 448 students in grades 3–5
  - Andrea Urbano, principal

Middle school

- Upper Township Middle School with 442 students in grades 6–8
  - Jeff Leek, principal

== Administration ==
Core members of the district's administration are:

- Allison J. Pessolano, superintendent
- Laurie Ryan, business administrator and board secretary

== Board of education ==
The district's board of education, comprised of nine members, sets policy and oversees the fiscal and educational operation of the district through its administration. As a Type II school district, the board's trustees are elected directly by voters to serve three-year terms of office on a staggered basis, with three seats up for election each year held (since 2012) as part of the November general election. The board appoints a superintendent to oversee the district's day-to-day operations and a business administrator to supervise the business functions of the district.
