= Carey Stadium =

Stadium in Ocean City, New Jersey, US

Coordinates: 39.279034°N 74.566312°W

- The Beach House
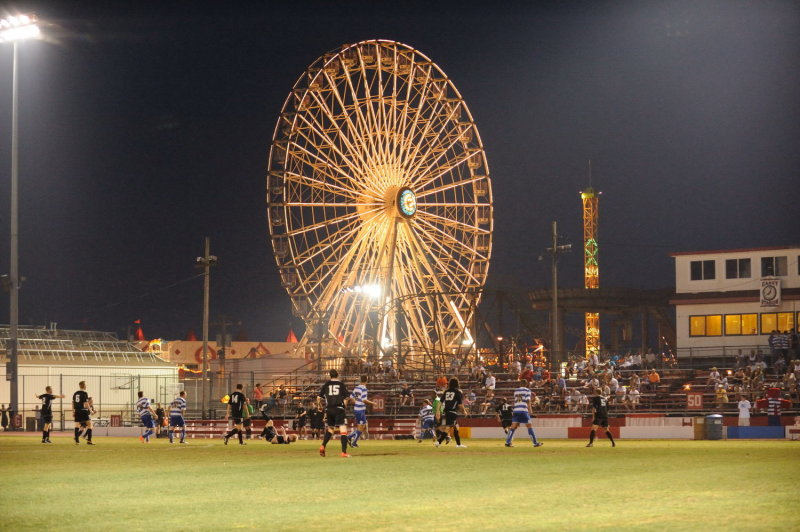
- Interactive map of Carey Stadium
- Location: Sixth St. & Boardwalk; Ocean City, New Jersey 08226
- Owner: Ocean City School District
- Capacity: 4,000
- Surface: FieldTurf

Construction
- Opened: 1919
- Renovated: 2016
- Cost: $1.2 million (new turf field-2016)

Tenants
- Ocean City School District Athletics; Ocean City Nor'easters (USL2) (2005–present)

Carey Stadium is an open-air multi-purpose stadium located just off the boardwalk in Ocean City, New Jersey. The stadium has been in use since 1919 and is primarily used by the Ocean City School District for Ocean City High School's Red Raiders football, soccer, and lacrosse teams.

Carey Stadium is also known as the home field for the Ocean City Nor'easters (formerly named Ocean City Barons) of the USL League Two. The club has called the stadium home since 2005. The stadium's nickname "The Beach House" was coined during the Nor'easters' 2005 season by the team's play-by-play announcer Josh Hakala. Since joining USL League Two in 2003, the Nor'easters have had the fourth-best home record of any team in the league.

The field of the stadium is surrounded by a 400 m (1,312.3 ft) rubberized running track allowing for track and field events to be held.

In 2016, the stadium's natural grass field was replaced with a new FieldTurf surface made of all-natural cork fill instead of crumb rubber. A new underground storm water management system was also installed under the playing field.

Carey Stadium is located a little more than 200 meters from the Atlantic Ocean, only one minor league sports team in the country plays closer to an ocean than the Nor'easters do. (Minor league baseball team Pensacola Blue Wahoos play at Admiral Fetterman Field in Pensacola, Florida)

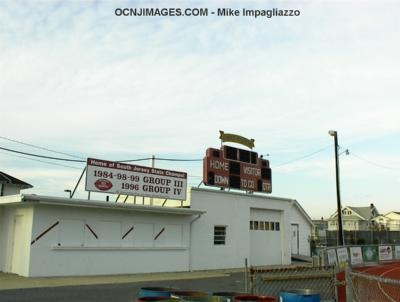
Carey Stadium 11.18.2000
