= Sea Isle City School District =

School district in Cape May County, New Jersey, US

Coordinates: 39.154233°N 74.696977°W

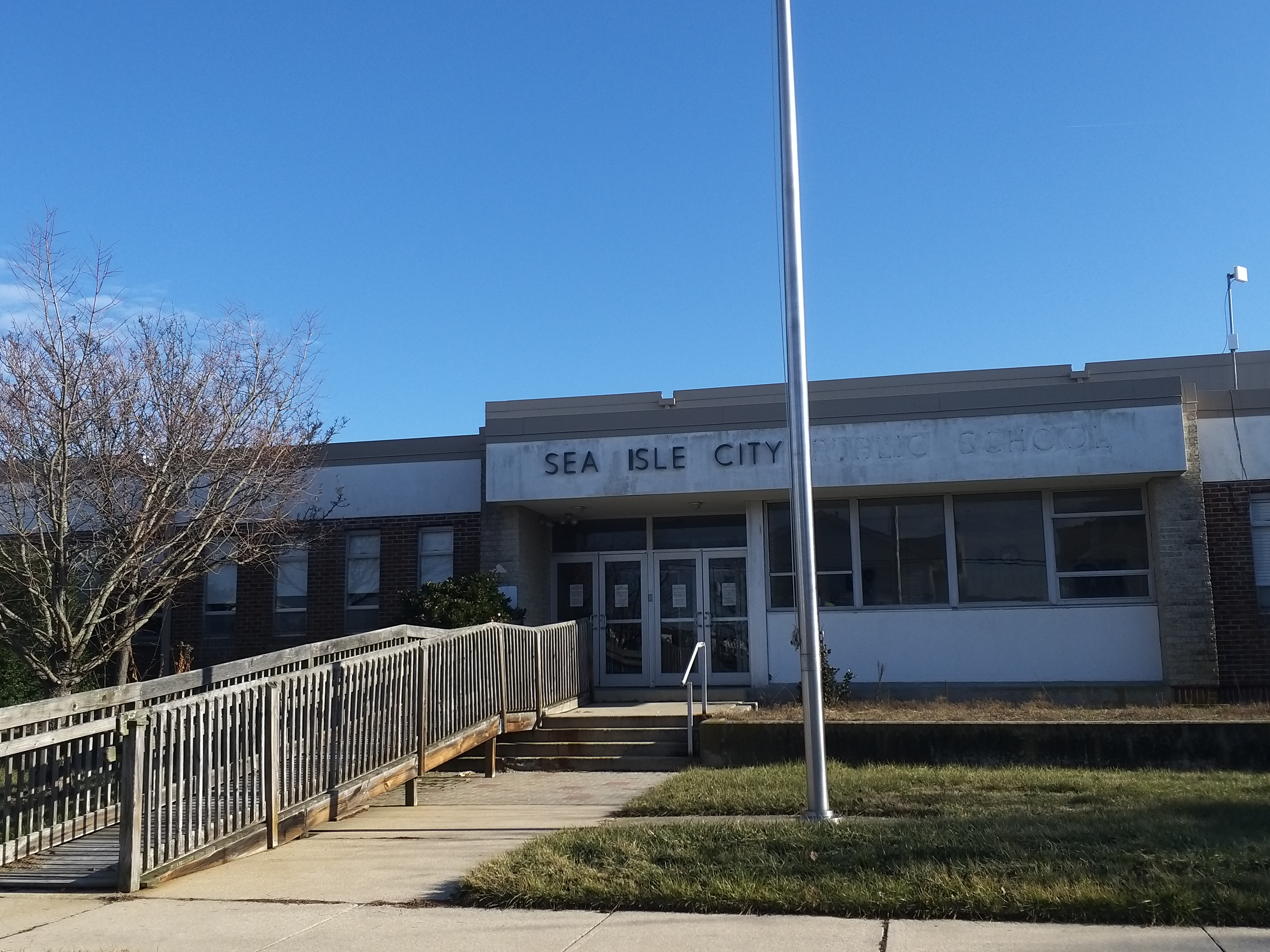
- The former Sea Isle City Public School
- 4501 Park Road; Sea Isle City, NJ 08243

District information
- Grades: None (K-8 until 2009, K-6 from 2009 until June 2012)
- Superintendent: Kathleen Taylor
- Business administrator: Thomas P. Grossi
- Schools: 0 (1 until June 2012)

Students and staff
- Enrollment: 67 (as of 2008-09)
- Faculty: 12.9 FTEs
- Student–teacher ratio: 5.2

Other information
- District Factor Group: B
- Website: seaisleschool.com
Ind.	Per pupil	District spending	Rank (*)	None (K-8 until June 2012) average	%± vs. average
1	Budgetary Cost	35,983	68	12,420	189.7%
2	Classroom Instruction	20,047	67	7,588	164.2%
6	Support Services	9,045	68	1,771	410.7%
8	Administrative Cost	1,658	45	1,411	17.5%
10	Operations & Maintenance	4,381	66	1,462	199.7%
13	Extracurricular Activities	424	65	97	337.1%
16	Median Teacher Salary	64,938	60	54,453
Data from NJDoE 2009 Taxpayers' Guide to Education Spending. *Of None (K-8 until June 2012) districts with 0-400 students. Lowest spending=1; Highest=68

The Sea Isle City School District is community public school district that formerly directly operated a school that served students in pre-Kindergarten through eighth grade from Sea Isle City, in the U.S. state of New Jersey. It currently does not operate any schools. Its headquarters is the Sea Isle City City Hall.

For all grades students are sent to attend Ocean City School District in Ocean City as part of a sending/receiving relationship. For ninth through twelfth grades, the destination school is Ocean City High School.

As of the 2008-09 school year, the district's one school had an enrollment of 67 students and 12.9 classroom teachers (on an FTE basis), for a student–teacher ratio of 5.2. With the full sending relationship in place, Sea Isle City sent 102 students to Ocean City in the 2013–14 school year, which had dropped to 62 in 2023–24.

== History ==
New Jersey School District Number 30 was organized after Henry Ludlam, the town marshall, received an order to conduct a census of children in the municipality on August 15, 1882. Aldine House and Dolphin House were the initial locations for classes. Enrollment was 67 for the 1884-1885 school year. The district had one principal and one teacher in 1890.

The six classroom Sea Isle City Public School opened in 1914. The city government in 1970 sought to build another school after it determined the 1914 building to be "structurally deficient". A school was built in 1971, and it was dedicated on February 5, 1972. The 1914 building was ultimately razed after being used for other purposes.

In 2002, the school had 185 students, after which the population declined. Merger discussions with the Ocean City School District in 2008 ended after the Ocean City district indicated that it was unwilling to accept Sea Isle City's tenured teachers, which it would be required to do under state law. Sea Isle City in 2008 spent $35,000 per student and hoped to see savings through the merger, even after adding in transportation costs.

By 2009 there were 67 students. The middle school closed at the end of the 2008–09 year and held its final graduation ceremony on June 18, 2009.

As of June 30, 2012, Sea Isle City School is no longer an operating school district. The district now sends all students pre-Kindergarten through twelfth grade to attend Ocean City Public Schools with which it shares administrative services.

In the wake of Hurricane Sandy in 2012, the municipal government moved several departments into the school building, which had withstood minimal storm-related damage.

The district had been classified by the New Jersey Department of Education as being in District Factor Group "B", the second lowest of eight groupings. District Factor Groups organize districts statewide to allow comparison by common socioeconomic characteristics of the local districts. From lowest socioeconomic status to highest, the categories are A, B, CD, DE, FG, GH, I and J.

In March 2023, the Sea Isle City Public School was demolished to clear ground for a planned $20 million community center due to be completed in 2025.

== School ==
The Sea Isle City School had an enrollment of 67 students in the 2008-09 school year.

== Administration ==
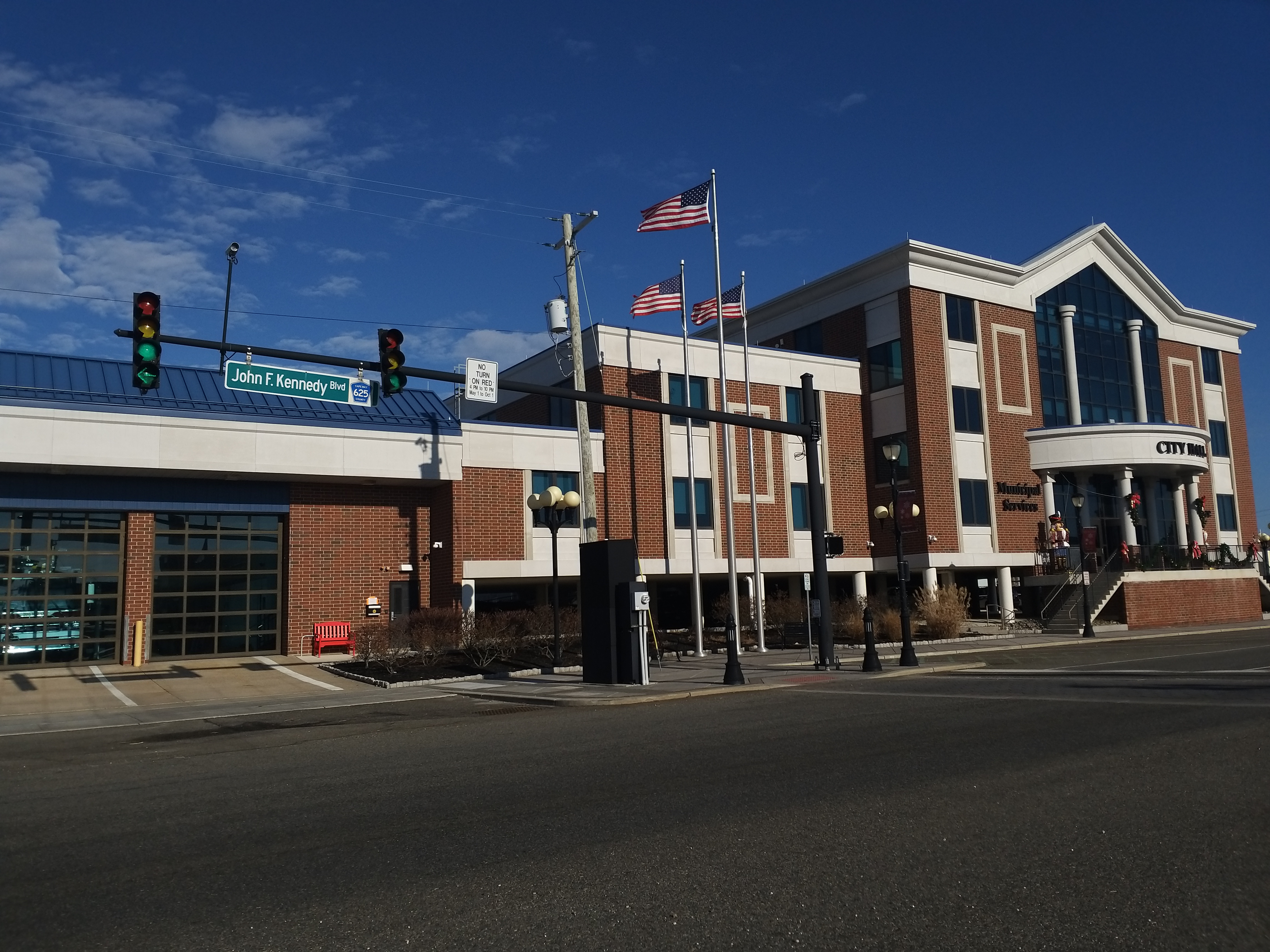
Sea Isle City City Hall, the current meeting place of the board of education

Core members of the district's administration are:

- Kathleen Taylor, superintendent
- Thomas P. Grossi, business administrator and board secretary

== Discrimination lawsuit ==
An African-American family filed a lawsuit against Sea Isle City, its police department and school board in 2004 alleging that their children were the target of racial slurs from teachers and were purposely excluded from participating in the Christmas play due to their race. In addition, the lawsuit also alleged that the police department filed false criminal charges against the family and harassed them. However, part of the lawsuit against Sea Isle City and the police department was settled in 2010 for $550,000. The lawsuit against the school board and individual teachers was settled in 2011 for $350,000.

== Board of education ==
The financial functions of the non-operating district are overseen by a board of education comprised of five members.

== See also ==
- List of school districts in New Jersey
