= Corbin City, New Jersey =

City in Atlantic County, New Jersey, US

- City
- City of Corbin City
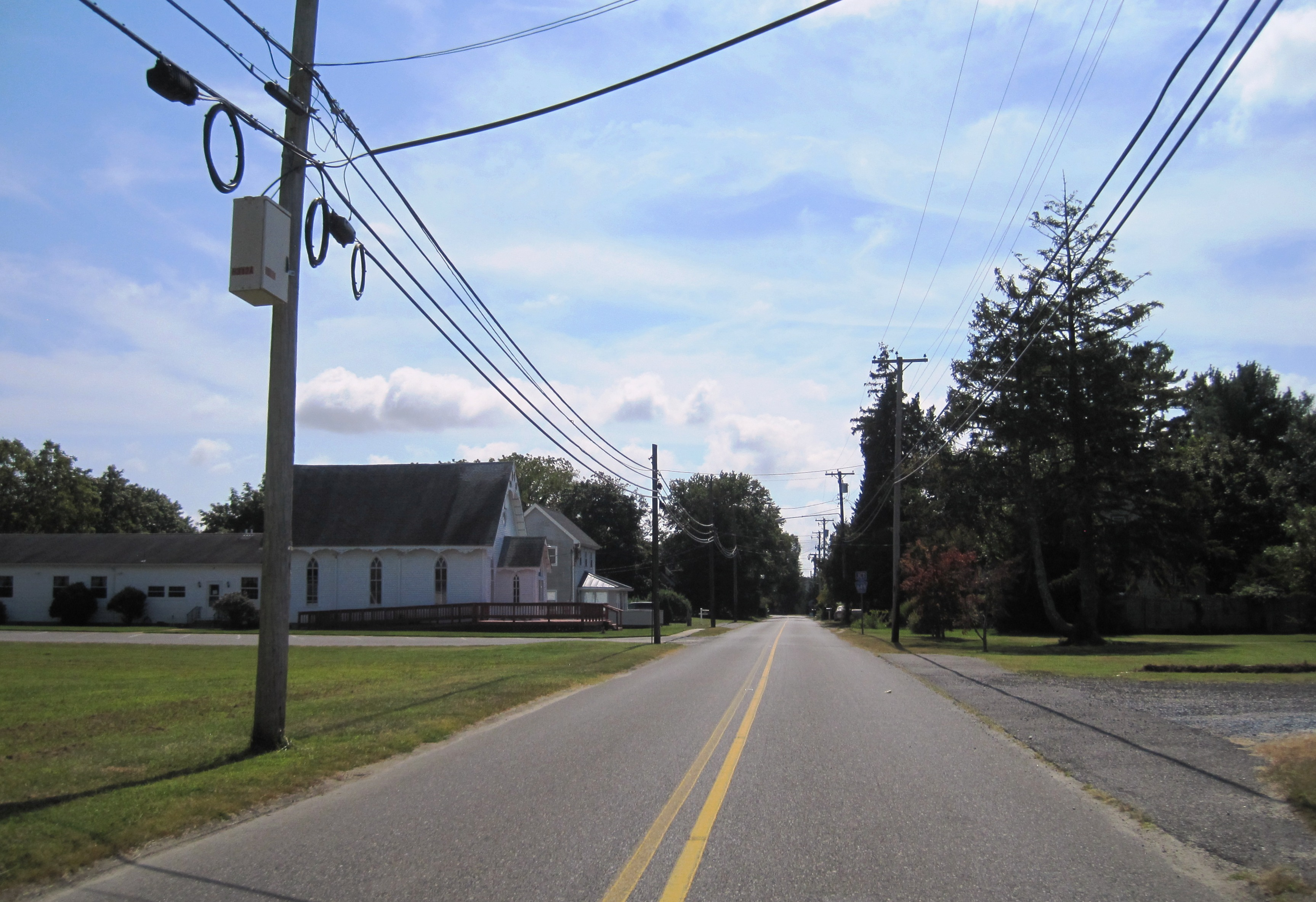
- Main Street in Corbin City

- Seal

- Location of Corbin City in Atlantic County highlighted in red (left). Inset map: Location of Atlantic County in New Jersey highlighted in orange (right).

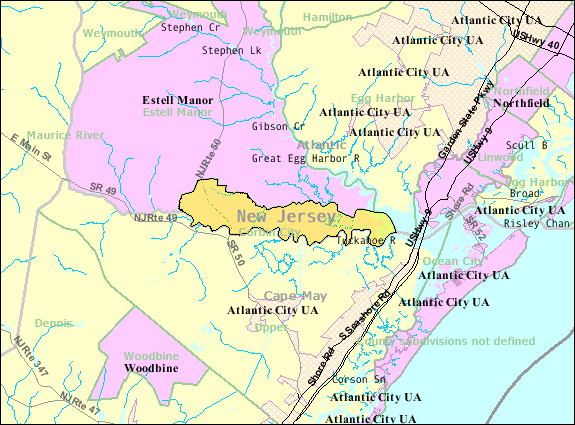
- Census Bureau map of Corbin City, New Jersey

- Location in Atlantic County Location in New Jersey Location in the United States
- Coordinates: 39.30162°N 74.76024°W
- Country: United States
- State: New Jersey
- County: Atlantic
- Incorporated: March 11, 1922
- Named after: Austin Corbin

Government
  - Type: City
  - Body: City Council
  - Mayor: Robert Schulte (R, term ends December 31, 2026)
  - Municipal clerk: Kimberly Johnson

Area
  - Total: 8.97 sq mi (23.24 km^{2})
  - Land: 7.70 sq mi (19.94 km^{2})
  - Water: 1.27 sq mi (3.30 km^{2}) 14.23%
  - Rank: 221st of 565 in state 12th of 23 in county
- Elevation: 0 ft (0 m)

Population (2020)
  - Total: 471
  - Estimate (2023): 481
  - Rank: 554th of 565 in state 23rd of 23 in county
  - Density: 61.2/sq mi (23.6/km^{2})
  - Rank: 551st of 565 in state 22nd of 23 in county
- Time zone: UTC−05:00 (Eastern (EST))
  - Summer (DST): UTC−04:00 (Eastern (EDT))
- ZIP Code: 08270
- Area code: 609
- FIPS code: 3400115160
- GNIS feature ID: 0885192
- Website: www.corbincitynj.com

Corbin City is a city in Atlantic County, in the U.S. state of New Jersey. The city, and all of Atlantic County, is part of the Atlantic City-Hammonton metropolitan statistical area, which in turn is included in the Philadelphia metropolitan area. As of the 2020 United States census, the city's population was 471, a decrease of 21 (−4.3%) from the 2010 census count of 492, which in turn reflected an increase of 24 (+5.1%) from the 468 counted in the 2000 census.

Corbin City was incorporated as a city by an act of the New Jersey Legislature on March 11, 1922, from portions of Weymouth Township. The borough was named for 19th-century banking and railroad entrepreneur Austin Corbin.

== History ==
The city has been one of several New Jersey municipalities that have considered consolidation. In 2008, Corbin City announced that it was investigating a prospective merger with neighboring Upper Township, across the county line in Cape May County, citing proximity and that Corbin City's children already attend Upper Township schools. There are no municipalities within New Jersey that have incorporated lands within multiple counties, and by 2010 Cape May County's Board of Chosen Freeholders objected to the plan, citing an analysis that the added costs of serving Corbin City would exceed revenues.

== Geography ==
According to the United States Census Bureau, the city had a total area of 8.97 square miles (23.24 km^{2}), including 7.70 square miles (19.94 km^{2}) of land and 1.28 square miles (3.3 km^{2}) of water (14.23%).

Unincorporated communities, localities and place names located partially or completely within the city include Buck Hill and Rock Point.

The city borders the municipalities of Egg Harbor Township and Estell Manor in Atlantic County; and Upper Township in Cape May County.

The city is one of 56 South Jersey municipalities that are included within the New Jersey Pinelands National Reserve, a protected natural area of unique ecology covering 1,100,000 acres (450,000 ha), that has been classified as a United States Biosphere Reserve and established by Congress in 1978 as the nation's first National Reserve. All of the city is included either in the state-designated Pinelands area (which includes portions of Atlantic County, along with areas in Burlington, Camden, Cape May, Cumberland, Gloucester and Ocean counties) or in the Pinelands National Reserve.

== Demographics ==
Historical population
Census	Pop.	Note	%±
1930	256		—
1940	220		−14.1%
1950	238		8.2%
1960	271		13.9%
1970	258		−4.8%
1980	254		−1.6%
1990	412		62.2%
2000	468		13.6%
2010	492		5.1%
2020	471		−4.3%
2023 (est.)	481		2.1%
Population sources: 1930–2000 1930; 1940–2000; 2010 2020

Corbin City is the least-populous municipality with the city type of government in New Jersey. While there are municipalities with smaller populations, they are either boroughs, towns, townships or villages.

=== 2010 census ===
The 2010 United States census counted 492 people, 185 households, and 130 families in the city. The population density was 64.2 per square mile (24.8/km^{2}). There were 212 housing units at an average density of 27.7 per square mile (10.7/km^{2}). The racial makeup was 97.56% (480) White, 0.41% (2) Black or African American, 0.00% (0) Native American, 1.22% (6) Asian, 0.00% (0) Pacific Islander, 0.61% (3) from other races, and 0.20% (1) from two or more races. Hispanic or Latino of any race were 3.46% (17) of the population.

Of the 185 households, 30.3% had children under the age of 18; 53.0% were married couples living together; 10.3% had a female householder with no husband present and 29.7% were non-families. Of all households, 24.9% were made up of individuals and 9.7% had someone living alone who was 65 years of age or older. The average household size was 2.66 and the average family size was 3.18.

23.2% of the population were under the age of 18, 9.1% from 18 to 24, 25.8% from 25 to 44, 29.7% from 45 to 64, and 12.2% who were 65 years of age or older. The median age was 39.1 years. For every 100 females, the population had 96.0 males. For every 100 females ages 18 and older there were 92.9 males.

=== 2000 census ===
As of the 2000 United States census there were 468 people, 172 households, and 120 families residing in the city. The population density was 59.3 inhabitants per square mile (22.9/km^{2}). There were 204 housing units at an average density of 25.9 per square mile (10.0/km^{2}). The racial makeup of the city was 94.02% White, 2.78% African American, 0.85% Native American, 1.28% Asian, 0.64% from other races, and 0.43% from two or more races. Hispanic or Latino of any race were 2.99% of the population.

There were 172 households, out of which 37.2% had children under the age of 18 living with them, 56.4% were married couples living together, 8.7% had a female householder with no husband present, and 29.7% were non-families. 22.7% of all households were made up of individuals, and 8.7% had someone living alone who was 65 years of age or older. The average household size was 2.72 and the average family size was 3.21.

In the city the population was spread out, with 29.9% under the age of 18, 4.9% from 18 to 24, 29.3% from 25 to 44, 25.4% from 45 to 64, and 10.5% who were 65 years of age or older. The median age was 36 years. For every 100 females, there were 98.3 males. For every 100 females age 18 and over, there were 105.0 males.

The median income for a household in the city was $47,083, and the median income for a family was $56,000. Males had a median income of $35,938 versus $27,250 for females. The per capita income for the city was $21,321. None of the families and 4.9% of the population were living below the poverty line, including no under eighteens and 17.0% of those over 64.

== Government ==
=== Local government ===
Corbin City operates within the City form of New Jersey municipal government. The city is one of 15 municipalities (of the 564) statewide that use this traditional form of government. The city's governing body is comprised of the Mayor and the three-member City Council. The Mayor is elected at-large to a two-year term of office and the City Council has three members elected at-large to three-year terms in office on a staggered basis, with one seat coming up for election each year as part of the November general election in a three-year cycle.

As of 2026, the Mayor of Corbin City is Republican Robert J. Schulte, whose term of office ends December 31, 2026. Members of the City Council are Council President LaVerne Kirn (R, 2027), Daniel Patterson (R, 2028), and Kelly Yeats (R, 2026).

In January 2022, the City Council selected former councilmember Thomas Bennis from a list of three candidates nominated by the Republican municipal committee to fill the seat vacated by Kristofer Surran, who resigned the previous month amid his accusations that his council colleagues had been violating the state's Open Public Meetings Act by addressing official city business outside of public meetings.

In 2018, the city had an average property tax bill of $3,680, the lowest in the county, compared to an average bill of $6,367 in Atlantic County and $8,767 statewide.

=== Federal, state and county representation ===
Corbin City is located in the 2nd Congressional District and is part of New Jersey's 1st state legislative district.

For the 119th United States Congress, New Jersey's 2nd congressional district is represented by Jeff Van Drew (R, Dennis Township). New Jersey is represented in the United States Senate by Democrats Cory Booker (Newark, term ends 2027) and Andy Kim (Moorestown, term ends 2031).

For the 2026–2027 session, the 1st legislative district of the New Jersey Legislature is represented in the State Senate by Mike Testa (R, Vineland) and in the General Assembly by Antwan McClellan (R, Ocean City) and Erik K. Simonsen (R, Lower Township).

Atlantic County is governed by a directly elected county executive and a nine-member Board of County Commissioners, responsible for legislation. The executive serves a four-year term and the commissioners are elected to staggered three-year terms, of which four are elected from the county on an at-large basis and five of the commissioners represent equally populated districts. As of 2025, Atlantic County's Executive is Dennis Levinson (R, Northfield), whose term of office ends December 31, 2027. Members of the Board of County Commissioners are:

Ernest D. Coursey (D, District 1-- Atlantic City, Egg Harbor Township (part), Longport, Margate City, and Ventnor City; 2025, Atlantic City), Chair Maureen Kern (R, District 2-- Egg Harbor Township (part), Linwood, Northfield, Somers Point and Pleasantville; 2027, Somers Point), Andrew Parker III (R, District 3-- Egg Harbor Township (part) and Hamilton Township (part); 2026, Egg Harbor Township), Richard R. Dase (R, District 4, including Brigantine, Galloway Township, Egg Harbor Township (part), and Port Republic; 2025, Galloway Township), Vice Chair James A. Bertino (R, District 5-- Buena, Buena Vista Township, Corbin City, Egg Harbor City, Estell Manor, Folsom, Hamilton Township (part), Hammonton, Mullica Township and Weymouth Township; 2027, Hammonton), June Byrnes (R, At-Large; 2026, Linwood), Michael Ruffu (R, At-Large; Margate, 2027) Amy L. Gatto (R, At-large; 2025, Hamilton Township) and John W. Risley (R, At-Large; 2026, Egg Harbor Township)

Atlantic County's constitutional officers are: Clerk Joesph J. Giralo (R, 2026, Hammonton), Sheriff Joe O'Donoghue (R, 2026, Egg Harbor Township) and Surrogate James Curcio (R, 2025, Hammonton).

=== Politics ===
As of March 23, 2011, there were a total of 303 registered voters in Corbin City, of which 54 (17.8% vs. 30.5% countywide) were registered as Democrats, 135 (44.6% vs. 25.2%) were registered as Republicans and 114 (37.6% vs. 44.3%) were registered as Unaffiliated. There were no voters registered to other parties. Among the city's 2010 Census population, 61.6% (vs. 58.8% in Atlantic County) were registered to vote, including 80.2% of those ages 18 and over (vs. 76.6% countywide).

Gubernatorial election results for Corbin City
Year	Republican		Democratic		Third party(ies)	
Year	No.	%	No.	%	No.	%
2025	192	70.33%	81	29.67%	0	0.00%
2021	183	71.76%	71	27.84%	1	0.39%
2017	84	49.41%	78	45.88%	8	4.71%
2013	134	70.90%	50	26.46%	5	2.65%
2009	95	59.01%	60	37.27%	6	3.73%
2005	94	69.12%	36	26.47%	6	4.41%

In the 2012 presidential election, Republican Mitt Romney received 138 votes (58.0% vs. 41.1% countywide), ahead of Democrat Barack Obama with 91 votes (38.2% vs. 57.9%) and other candidates with 7 votes (2.9% vs. 0.9%), among the 238 ballots cast by the city's 315 registered voters, for a turnout of 75.6% (vs. 65.8% in Atlantic County). In the 2008 presidential election, Republican John McCain received 150 votes (62.5% vs. 41.6% countywide), ahead of Democrat Barack Obama with 85 votes (35.4% vs. 56.5%) and other candidates with 5 votes (2.1% vs. 1.1%), among the 240 ballots cast by the city's 317 registered voters, for a turnout of 75.7% (vs. 68.1% in Atlantic County). In the 2004 presidential election, Republican George W. Bush received 143 votes (63.8% vs. 46.2% countywide), ahead of Democrat John Kerry with 77 votes (34.4% vs. 52.0%) and other candidates with 1 vote (0.4% vs. 0.8%), among the 224 ballots cast by the city's 278 registered voters, for a turnout of 80.6% (vs. 69.8% in the whole county).

Presidential elections results
Year	Republican	Democratic	Third Parties
2024	70.4% 228	28.4% 92	1.4% 4
2020	65.9% 216	33.2% 109	0.9% 3
2016	60.9% 148	32.5% 79	6.6% 16
2012	58.0% 138	38.2% 91	2.9% 7
2008	62.5% 150	35.4% 85	2.1% 5
2004	63.8% 143	34.4% 77	0.4% 1

In the 2013 gubernatorial election, Republican Chris Christie received 134 votes (68.4% vs. 60.0% countywide), ahead of Democrat Barbara Buono with 50 votes (25.5% vs. 34.9%) and other candidates with 5 votes (2.6% vs. 1.3%), among the 196 ballots cast by the city's 324 registered voters, yielding a 60.5% turnout (vs. 41.5% in the county). In the 2009 gubernatorial election, Republican Chris Christie received 95 votes (58.3% vs. 47.7% countywide), ahead of Democrat Jon Corzine with 60 votes (36.8% vs. 44.5%), Independent Chris Daggett with 6 votes (3.7% vs. 4.8%) and other candidates with no votes (0.0% vs. 1.2%), among the 163 ballots cast by the city's 308 registered voters, yielding a 52.9% turnout (vs. 44.9% in the county).

United States Senate election results for Corbin City1
Year	Republican		Democratic		Third party(ies)	
Year	No.	%	No.	%	No.	%
2024	213	69.16%	90	29.22%	5	1.62%
2018	130	65.33%	60	30.15%	9	4.52%
2012	133	60.45%	82	37.27%	5	2.27%
2006	107	62.57%	60	35.09%	4	2.34%

United States Senate election results for Corbin City2
Year	Republican		Democratic		Third party(ies)	
Year	No.	%	No.	%	No.	%
2020	215	66.56%	103	31.89%	5	1.55%
2014	110	60.77%	69	38.12%	2	1.10%
2013	69	62.16%	41	36.94%	1	0.90%
2008	139	62.33%	80	35.87%	4	1.79%

== Education ==
Corbin City is a non-operating school district. Students attend public school for pre-kindergarten through eighth grade in the Upper Township School District, as part of a sending/receiving relationship. As of the 2018–19 school year, the district, comprised of three schools, had an enrollment of 1,448 students and 131.0 classroom teachers (on an FTE basis), for a student–teacher ratio of 11.1:1. Schools in the district (with 2018–19 enrollment data from the National Center for Education Statistics) are Upper Township Primary School with 492 students in grades Pre-K–2, Upper Township Elementary School with 481 students in grades 3–5 and Upper Township Middle School with 469 students in grades 6–8.

High school students in public school for ninth through twelfth grades attend Ocean City High School in Ocean City as part of a sending/receiving relationship with the Ocean City School District, together with students from Longport, Ocean City, Sea Isle City and Upper Township. As of the 2018–2019 school year, the high school had an enrollment of 1,245 students and 98.5 classroom teachers (on an FTE basis), for a student–teacher ratio of 12.6:1.

City public school students are also eligible to attend the Atlantic County Institute of Technology in the Mays Landing section of Hamilton Township or the Charter-Tech High School for the Performing Arts, located in Somers Point.

== Transportation ==
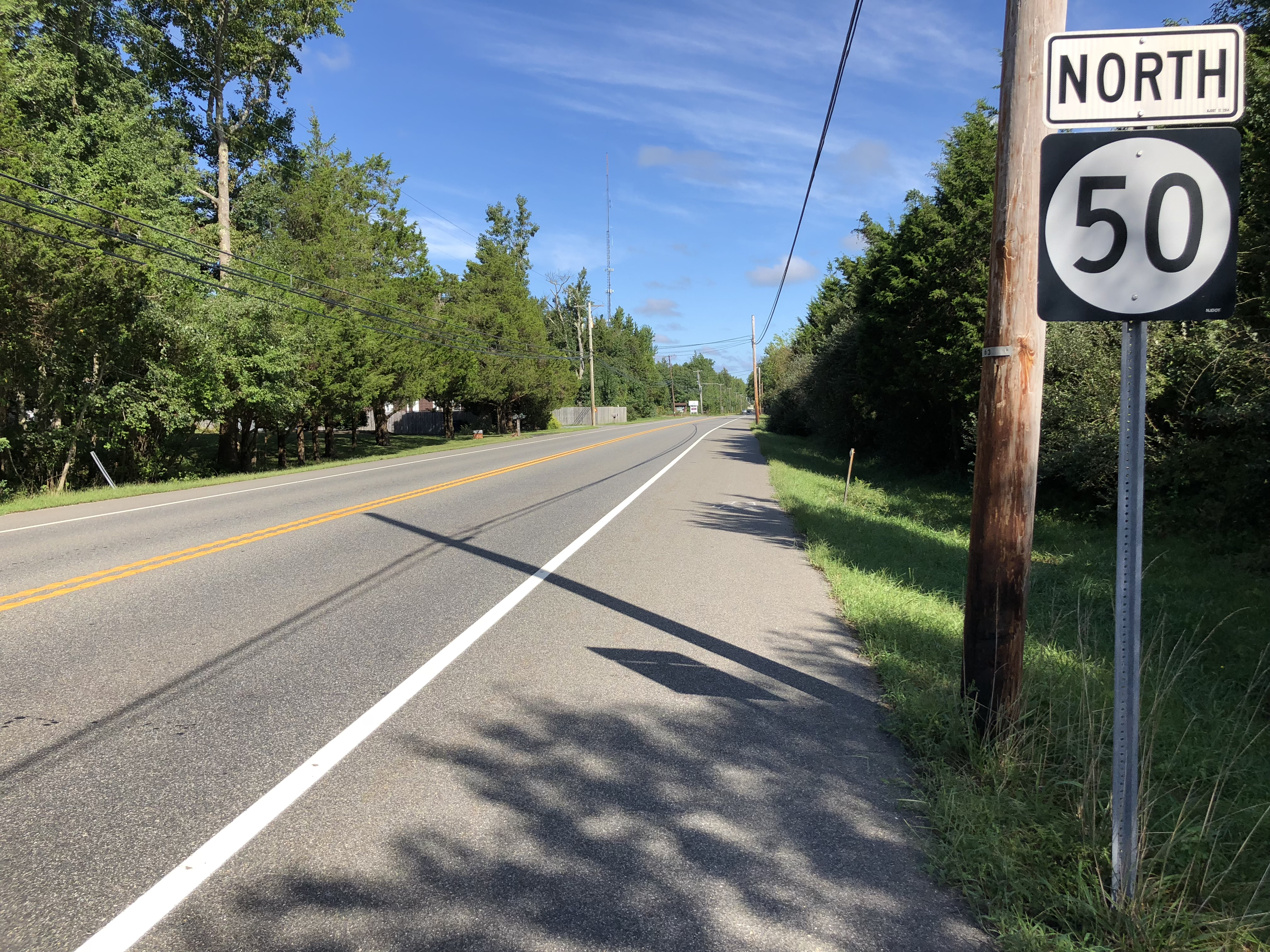
Route 50 northbound through Corbin City

=== Roads and highways ===
As of May 2010, the city had a total of 10.44 miles (16.80 km) of roadways, of which 3.52 miles (5.66 km) were maintained by the municipality, 4.55 miles (7.32 km) by Atlantic County and 2.37 miles (3.81 km) by the New Jersey Department of Transportation.

Route 50 is the main road that passes through the city. The Garden State Parkway is accessible in neighboring Upper Township.

=== Public transportation ===
NJ Transit provide bus service in the city on the 315 route that runs between Cape May and Philadelphia.

== Media ==
Two FM radio stations serving the greater Atlantic City area transmit from a site in Corbin City. They are WENJ (97.3), an ESPN Radio affiliate licensed to Millville with studios in Northfield, and WRTQ (91.3), an Ocean City-licensed relay of WRTI in Philadelphia, which programs classical music and jazz.
