= Adam Williamson =

American soccer player

Personal information
- Full name: Adam Williamson
- Date of birth: August 4, 1984 (age 42)
- Place of birth: Petersburg, NJ, United States
- Height: 5 ft 10 in (1.78 m)
- Position: Midfielder

Team information
- Current team: Ocean City Barons
- Number: 17

College career
Years	Team	Apps	(Gls)
2002–05	Lehigh		

Senior career*
Years	Team	Apps	(Gls)
2005	Ocean City Barons	13	(4)
2006	New England Revolution	8	(0)
2007	Wilmington Hammerheads	14	(1)
2008	Ocean City Barons	12	(0)
- * Club domestic league appearances and goals as of May 20, 2007 ‡ National team caps and goals as of November 24, 2006

Adam Williamson (born August 4, 1984) is a former American soccer player who last played as a midfielder for the Ocean City Barons in the USL Premier Development League.

Williamson grew up in Petersburg, Cape May County, New Jersey and played soccer at Ocean City High School, where he was an All American his senior year.

Williamson played college soccer for Lehigh University from 2002 to 2005. In 79 games (most of them at Lehigh), he scored 12 goals and recorded 15 assists, was named Patriot League Offensive Player of the Year, and a two-time 1st Team Regional All American. He played for the Ocean City Barons of the Premier Development League in the summer of 2005, playing in 13 games, notching four goals and six assists. He was selected in the third round, 35th overall in the 2006 MLS Draft by the New England Revolution, having made 8 appearances. He signed for the Hammerheads in April 2007 and made his debut against Charlotte Eagles on May 11, 2007. He played in 14 league games for the Hammerheads that year, scoring one goal and two assists. He scored his first professional goal on June 19, 2007, in a road game at the Bermuda Hogges. It was the lone goal in a 1–0 victory.

Williamson last played for the Ocean City Barons during the 2008 season where he appeared in 12 games and dished out four assists.

In May 2022, Williamson was inducted into the South Jersey Soccer Hall of Fame.
