= Doug Colman =

American football player and coach (born 1973)

No. 58, 59
- Position: Linebacker

Personal information
- Born: June 4, 1973 (age 53); Somers Point, New Jersey, U.S.
- Listed height: 6 ft 3 in (1.91 m)
- Listed weight: 250 lb (113 kg)

Career information
- High school: Ocean City (NJ)
- College: Nebraska
- NFL draft: 1996: 6th round, 171st overall pick

Career history

Playing
- New York Giants (1996–1998); Tennessee Titans (1999); Oakland Raiders (2000)*; Cleveland Browns (2000); New York Jets (2001)*
- * Offseason or practice squad member only

Coaching
- Nebraska (2008-2009) Defensive & Special Team Quality Control Coach; Tulane (2010-2011) Linebackers & Nickels Coach, Special Teams Assistant; Coastal Carolina (2012–2013) Linebackers Coach, Co-Special Coordinator; Houston Texans (2014–2017) Assistant Special Teams Coordinator, Defensive Assistant- Linebackers; Dallas Cowboys (2018) Assistant Special Teams coach; Cleveland Browns (2019–2021) Assistant Special Teams coach

Awards and highlights
- 2× National champion (1994, 1995)

Career NFL statistics
- Tackles: 48
- Stats at Pro Football Reference

Douglass Clayton Colman (born June 4, 1973) is an American football coach, former player and son of former NFL player Wayne Charles Colman. He was a linebacker in the National Football League (NFL) for five seasons with the New York Giants, Tennessee Titans and Cleveland Browns after playing college football at the University of Nebraska–Lincoln.

== Playing career ==
Colman started his career at Ocean City High School where he is a member of the hall of fame. As a senior, he was named "South Jersey Defensive Player of the Year" at linebacker and also gained more than 1,000 yards as fullback. Later he played college football at and graduated from the University of Nebraska–Lincoln. The Cornhuskers won back-to-back, undefeated national championships in the 1994 and 1995 seasons and were Big Eight Conference Champions 1991-1995. He was then drafted by the New York Giants in the sixth round (171st pick overall) of the 1996 NFL draft. Colman spent five seasons in the NFL from 1996 to 2000, playing a total of 64 games for the Giants, Tennessee Titans and Cleveland Browns. He helped the Titans to Super Bowl XXXIV in which Colman appeared as a substitute, however they lost to the Kurt Warner-led St. Louis Rams. That same year Colman had participated in the "Music City Miracle" vs. the Buffalo Bills that allowed the Titans to continue in the playoffs.

== Coaching career ==
Following his stay in the NFL, Colman coached freshman football at his alma mater Ocean City High School. In 2002, he became an assistant coach and teacher for Oakcrest High School before becoming head coach at Absegami High School in 2003. During his tenure at Absegami, Colman compiled an overall record of 40–15, with two appearances in the South Jersey Group IV championship game, winning it in 2006. Colman's Braves also won three straight Cape-Atlantic American Conference championships. He guided Absegami High School to its only football championships.

Colman joined the Amsterdam Admirals for the 2007 season as a member of the NFL Europe coaching program, serving as an assistant linebackers and special teams coach during the team's final season. He spent the next two years as the defensive quality coach working with linebackers and special teams at his alma mater, Nebraska. In 2010, Colman joined Bob Toledo's staff at Tulane University where he coached the linebackers and assisted with special teams. After two seasons in that capacity, he was hired as the linebackers coach and assistant special teams coordinator at Coastal Carolina. Colman was marked to be Penn State's new linebacker coach before following Bill O'brien to the Houston Texans.

He was recently the special teams and linebacker assistant for the Houston Texans. He was fired on January 2, 2018.

He was hired by the Dallas Cowboys to be the special teams assistant for the 2018 season.

In 2019, Colman was hired by the Cleveland Browns as the Special Teams assistant coach.
