= Longport, New Jersey =

City in Atlantic County, New Jersey, US

- Borough
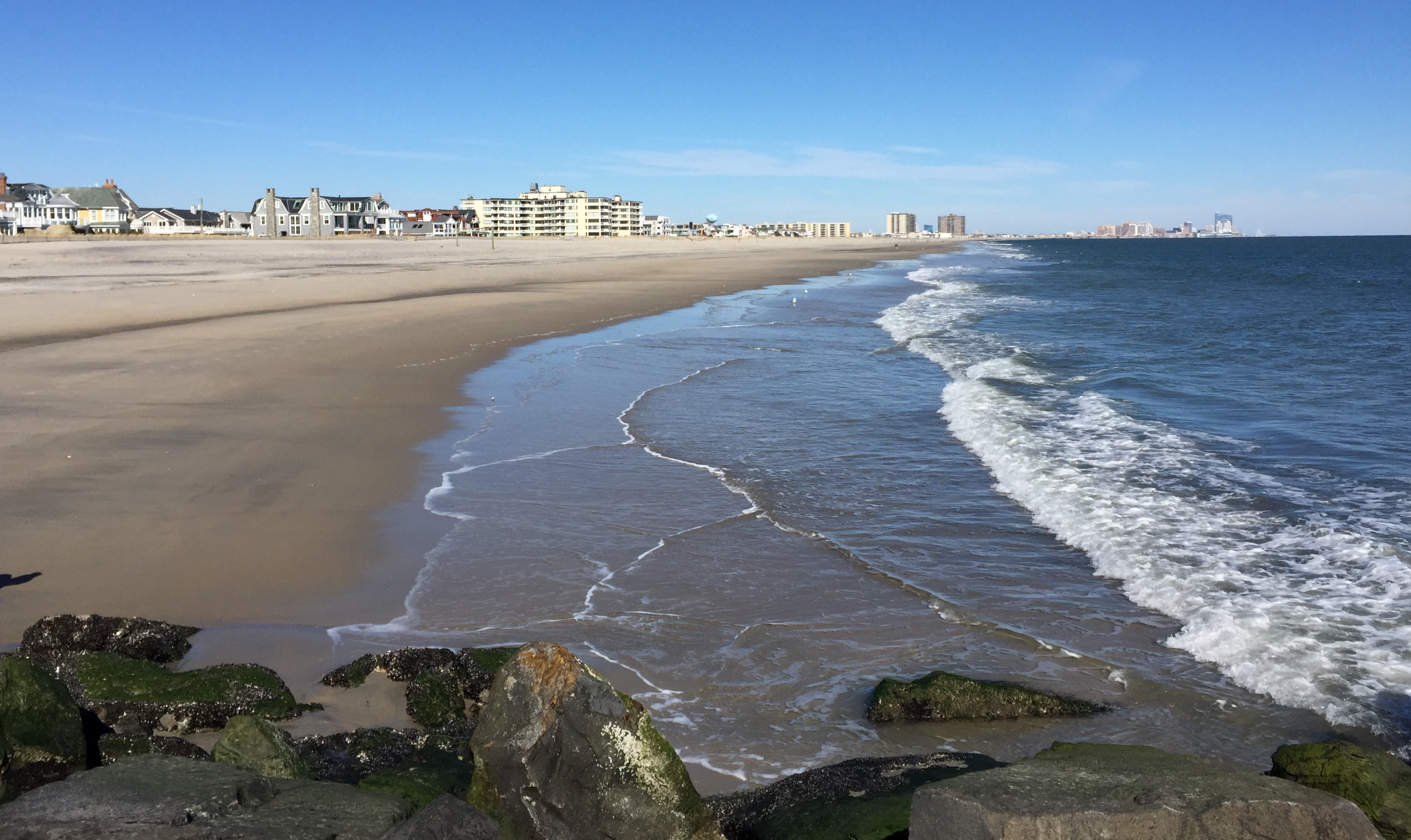
- Longport Beach

- coat of arms

- Location of Longport in Atlantic County highlighted in red (left). Inset map: Location of Atlantic County in New Jersey highlighted in orange (right).

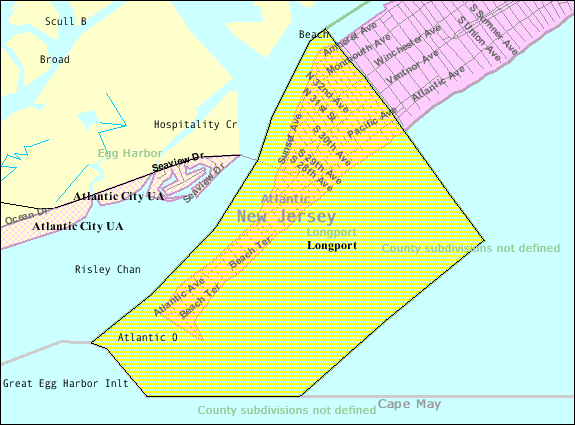
- Census Bureau map of Longport, New Jersey

- Location in Atlantic County Location in New Jersey Location in the United States
- Coordinates: 39.311337°N 74.526957°W
- Country: United States
- State: New Jersey
- County: Atlantic
- Incorporated: March 7, 1898
- Named for: James Long

Government
  - Type: Walsh Act
  - Body: Board of Commissioners
  - Mayor: Nicholas Russo (term ends December 31, 2024)
  - Municipal clerk: Monica Kyle

Area
  - Total: 1.56 sq mi (4.03 km^{2})
  - Land: 0.39 sq mi (1.02 km^{2})
  - Water: 1.16 sq mi (3.01 km^{2}) 74.49%
  - Rank: 447th of 565 in state 23rd of 23 in county
- Elevation: 0 ft (0 m)

Population (2020)
  - Total: 893
  - Estimate (2023): 878
  - Rank: 538th of 565 in state 22nd of 23 in county
  - Density: 2,259.8/sq mi (872.5/km^{2})
  - Rank: 277th of 565 in state 7th of 23 in county
- Time zone: UTC−05:00 (Eastern (EST))
  - Summer (DST): UTC−04:00 (Eastern (EDT))
- ZIP Code: 08403
- Area code: 609 exchanges: 487, 822, 823
- FIPS code: 3400141370
- GNIS feature ID: 0885286
- Website: www.longportnj.gov

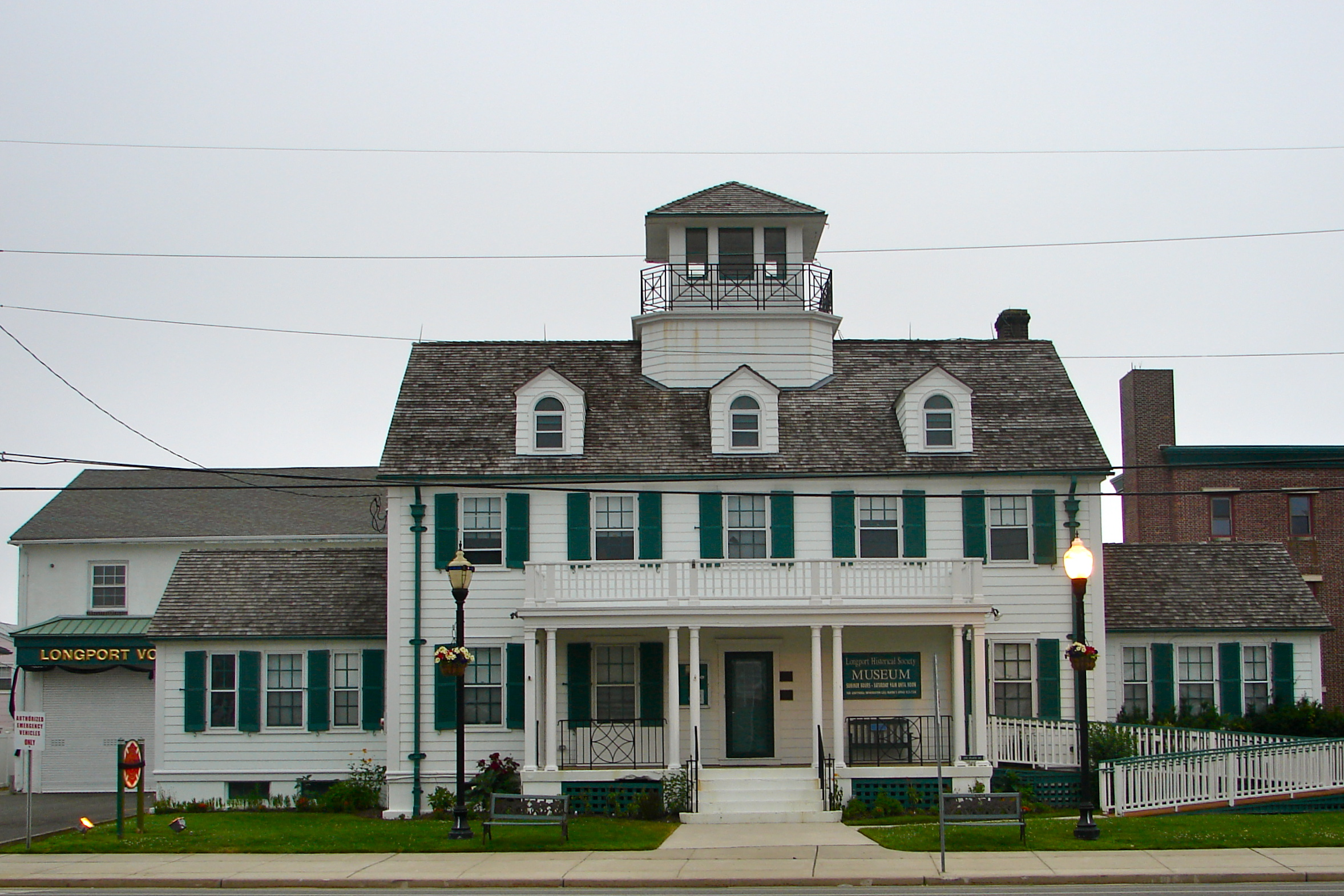
Great Egg Coast Guard Station in Longport

Longport is a borough situated on the Jersey Shore on Absecon Island, within Atlantic County, in the U.S. state of New Jersey, on the Atlantic Ocean shoreline. As of the 2020 United States census, the borough's population was 893, a decrease of two people (−0.2%) from the 2010 census count of 895, which in turn reflected a decline of 159 (−15.1%) from the 1,054 counted in the 2000 census.

Geographically, the city, and all of Atlantic County, is part of the South Jersey region of the state and of the Atlantic City-Hammonton metropolitan statistical area, which in turn is included in the Philadelphia metropolitan area.

In 2018, New Jersey Business Magazine listed Longport at 22nd in its listing of "The Most Expensive ZIP Codes in New Jersey", with a median sale price 2017 of $767,500.

== History ==
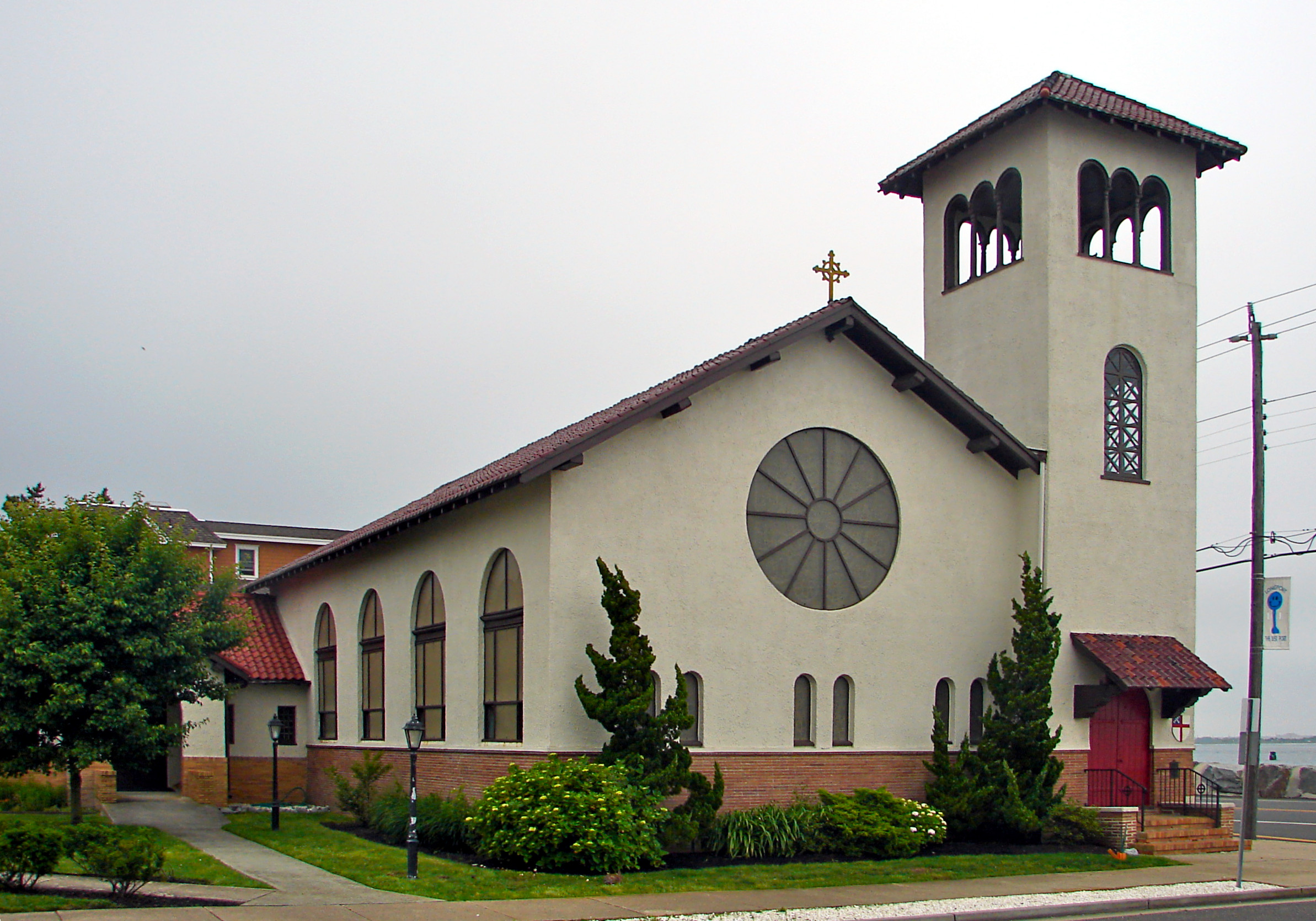
Church of the Redeemer, which has now burned down as a result of a derecho in June 2012. The church was rebuilt and reopened in July 2015.

James Long, an absentee owner, purchased a parcel in 1857 that grew over the years as sand accumulated and as additional property was purchased. Acquired by M. Simpson McCullough in 1882, the community was named Longport in honor of Long.

Longport was incorporated as a borough by an act of the New Jersey Legislature on March 7, 1898, from portions of Egg Harbor Township.

In 2014, residents of Seaview Harbor, located across Beach Thorofare, submitted a petition to join neighboring Longport, citing lack of access to the rest of Egg Harbor Township and high taxes. In November 2016, the Township Committee voted to deny the secession plan. The plan has been brought before an appeals judge and the outcome is pending.

== Geography ==
According to the United States Census Bureau, the borough had a total area of 1.56 square miles (4.03 km^{2}), including 0.40 square miles (1.02 km^{2}) of land and 1.16 square miles (3.01 km^{2}) of water (74.49%).

Longport is located on the southwest corner of 8.1-mile (13.0 km) long Absecon Island, along with Margate City, Ventnor City and Atlantic City to the northeast.

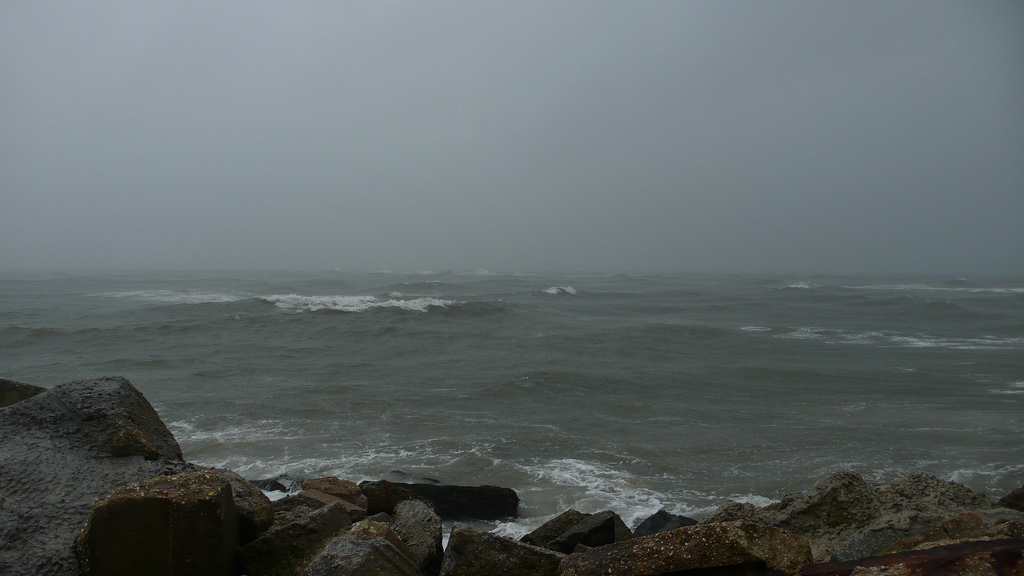
Longport, south from 11th Avenue

Streets at the southern end of the borough start at 11th Avenue, as the 180 acres (73 ha) that made up the ten numbered streets below it were washed out on the barrier island by a series of storms between 1900 and 1916. The Great Egg Harbor Inlet shifted north, and Ocean City island was extended by what is now the Gardens neighborhood of that city.

== Demographics ==
Historical population
Census	Pop.	Note	%±
1900	80		—
1910	118		47.5%
1920	200		69.5%
1930	228		14.0%
1940	303		32.9%
1950	618		104.0%
1960	1,077		74.3%
1970	1,225		13.7%
1980	1,249		2.0%
1990	1,224		−2.0%
2000	1,054		−13.9%
2010	895		−15.1%
2020	893		−0.2%
2023 (est.)	878	▼	−1.7%
Population sources: 1900–2000 1900–1920; 1900–1910 1910–1930; 1940–2000 2000; 2010 2020

=== 2010 census ===
The 2010 United States census counted 895 people, 470 households, and 252 families in the borough. The population density was 2,323.7 per square mile (897.2/km^{2}). There were 1,656 housing units at an average density of 4,299.4 per square mile (1,660.0/km^{2}). The racial makeup was 98.88% (885) White, 0.34% (3) Black or African American, 0.11% (1) Native American, 0.45% (4) Asian, 0.00% (0) Pacific Islander, 0.11% (1) from other races, and 0.11% (1) from two or more races. Hispanic or Latino of any race were 1.12% (10) of the population.

Of the 470 households, 11.1% had children under the age of 18; 45.1% were married couples living together; 5.1% had a female householder with no husband present and 46.4% were non-families. Of all households, 43.2% were made up of individuals and 25.3% had someone living alone who was 65 years of age or older. The average household size was 1.90 and the average family size was 2.61.

11.6% of the population were under the age of 18, 3.8% from 18 to 24, 10.6% from 25 to 44, 36.3% from 45 to 64, and 37.7% who were 65 years of age or older. The median age was 58.2 years. For every 100 females, the population had 95.4 males. For every 100 females ages 18 and older there were 88.3 males.

The Census Bureau's 2006–2010 American Community Survey showed that (in 2010 inflation-adjusted dollars) median household income was $70,625 (with a margin of error of +/− $13,665) and the median family income was $107,188 (+/− $48,480). Males had a median income of $72,143 (+/− $53,388) versus $65,357 (+/− $24,760) for females. The per capita income for the borough was $78,988 (+/− $16,924). About 1.0% of families and 5.1% of the population were below the poverty line, including none of those under age 18 and 5.8% of those age 65 or over.

=== 2000 census ===
As of the 2000 United States census there were 1,054 people, 544 households, and 317 families residing in the borough. The population density was 2,765.2 inhabitants per square mile (1,067.6/km^{2}). There were 1,574 housing units at an average density of 4,129.5 per square mile (1,594.4/km^{2}). The racial makeup of the borough was 98.58% White, 0.09% African American, 1.14% Asian, and 0.19% from two or more races. Hispanic or Latino of any race were 0.47% of the population.

There were 544 households, out of which 10.8% had children under the age of 18 living with them, 51.3% were married couples living together, 5.1% had a female householder with no husband present, and 41.7% were non-families. 37.5% of all households were made up of individuals, and 19.3% had someone living alone who was 65 years of age or older. The average household size was 1.94 and the average family size was 2.53.

In the borough the population was spread out, with 11.4% under the age of 18, 2.6% from 18 to 24, 18.9% from 25 to 44, 32.6% from 45 to 64, and 34.5% who were 65 years of age or older. The median age was 57 years. For every 100 females, there were 86.5 males. For every 100 females age 18 and over, there were 85.0 males.

The median income for a household in the borough was $51,324, and the median income for a family was $68,194. Males had a median income of $53,250 versus $36,146 for females. The per capita income for the borough was $50,884. About 2.9% of families and 3.7% of the population were below the poverty line, including 2.5% of those under age 18 and 5.5% of those age 65 or over.

== Parks and recreation ==
Longport offers surfing and other water sports recreation on the beaches. There is also a tennis court and playground.

== Government ==
=== Local government ===
Longport operates under the Walsh Act commission form of New Jersey municipal government. The city is one of 30 municipalities (of the 564) statewide that use the commission form of government. The governing body is comprised of three commissioners, who are elected at-large to four-year concurrent terms of office on a non-partisan basis as part of the May municipal election. Each commissioner is assigned a department to oversee and administer. The Mayor is then selected from among the three elected Commissioners by a vote between them and assigned to the office by resolution.

As of 2023, members of the Longport Borough Commission are Mayor Nicholas Russo (Commissioner of Public Works, Parks and Public Property), Daniel Lawler (Commissioner of Public Affairs and Public Safety) and James P. Leeds Sr. (Commissioner of Revenue and Finance), all of whom are serving terms that end December 31, 2024.

In July 2016, the Board of Commissioners voted to shift municipal elections from May to November, which also had the effect of extending the four-year terms of the three commissioners by another six months. The change allows the borough to save the costs associated with conducting the May municipal election.

In 2018, the borough had an average property tax bill of $10,872, the highest in the county, compared to an average bill of $8,767 statewide.

=== Federal, state and county representation ===
Longport is located in the 2nd Congressional District and is part of New Jersey's 2nd state legislative district.

For the 119th United States Congress, New Jersey's 2nd congressional district is represented by Jeff Van Drew (R, Dennis Township). New Jersey is represented in the United States Senate by Democrats Cory Booker (Newark, term ends 2027) and Andy Kim (Moorestown, term ends 2031).

For the 2026–2027 session, the 2nd legislative district of the New Jersey Legislature is represented in the New Jersey Senate by Vincent J. Polistina (R, Egg Harbor Township) and in the General Assembly by Don Guardian (R, Atlantic City) and Maureen Rowan (D, Atlantic City).

Atlantic County is governed by a directly elected county executive and a nine-member Board of County Commissioners, responsible for legislation. The executive serves a four-year term and the commissioners are elected to staggered three-year terms, of which four are elected from the county on an at-large basis and five of the commissioners represent equally populated districts. As of 2025, Atlantic County's Executive is Dennis Levinson (R, Northfield), whose term of office ends December 31, 2027. Members of the Board of County Commissioners are:

Ernest D. Coursey (D, District 1-- Atlantic City, Egg Harbor Township (part), Longport, Margate City, and Ventnor City; 2025, Atlantic City), Chair Maureen Kern (R, District 2-- Egg Harbor Township (part), Linwood, Northfield, Somers Point and Pleasantville; 2027, Somers Point), Andrew Parker III (R, District 3-- Egg Harbor Township (part) and Hamilton Township (part); 2026, Egg Harbor Township), Richard R. Dase (R, District 4, including Brigantine, Galloway Township, Egg Harbor Township (part), and Port Republic; 2025, Galloway Township), Vice Chair James A. Bertino (R, District 5-- Buena, Buena Vista Township, Corbin City, Egg Harbor City, Estell Manor, Folsom, Hamilton Township (part), Hammonton, Mullica Township and Weymouth Township; 2027, Hammonton), June Byrnes (R, At-Large; 2026, Linwood), Michael Ruffu (R, At-Large; Margate, 2027) Amy L. Gatto (R, At-large; 2025, Hamilton Township) and John W. Risley (R, At-Large; 2026, Egg Harbor Township)

Atlantic County's constitutional officers are: Clerk Joesph J. Giralo (R, 2026, Hammonton), Sheriff Joe O'Donoghue (R, 2026, Egg Harbor Township) and Surrogate James Curcio (R, 2025, Hammonton).

=== Politics ===
As of March 2011, there were a total of 774 registered voters in Longport, of which 146 (18.9% vs. 30.5% countywide) were registered as Democrats, 366 (47.3% vs. 25.2%) were registered as Republicans and 262 (33.9% vs. 44.3%) were registered as Unaffiliated. There were no voters registered to other parties. Among the borough's 2010 Census population, 86.5% (vs. 58.8% in Atlantic County) were registered to vote, including 97.9% of those ages 18 and over (vs. 76.6% countywide).

Gubernatorial election results for Longport
Year	Republican		Democratic		Third party(ies)	
Year	No.	%	No.	%	No.	%
2025	284	61.21%	180	38.79%	0	0.00%
2021	286	65.15%	152	34.62%	1	0.23%
2017	192	67.13%	91	31.82%	3	1.05%
2013	306	79.07%	81	20.93%	0	0.00%
2009	280	64.67%	135	31.18%	18	4.16%
2005	254	59.62%	162	38.03%	10	2.35%

In the 2012 presidential election, Republican Mitt Romney received 337 votes (66.5% vs. 41.1% countywide), ahead of Democrat Barack Obama with 160 votes (31.6% vs. 57.9%) and other candidates with 4 votes (0.8% vs. 0.9%), among the 507 ballots cast by the borough's 791 registered voters, for a turnout of 64.1% (vs. 65.8% in Atlantic County). In the 2008 presidential election, Republican John McCain received 372 votes (64.4% vs. 41.6% countywide), ahead of Democrat Barack Obama with 195 votes (33.7% vs. 56.5%) and other candidates with 10 votes (1.7% vs. 1.1%), among the 578 ballots cast by the borough's 903 registered voters, for a turnout of 64.0% (vs. 68.1% in Atlantic County). In the 2004 presidential election, Republican George W. Bush received 412 votes (62.0% vs. 46.2% countywide), ahead of Democrat John Kerry with 242 votes (36.4% vs. 52.0%) and other candidates with 2 votes (0.3% vs. 0.8%), among the 664 ballots cast by the borough's 946 registered voters, for a turnout of 70.2% (vs. 69.8% in the whole county).

Presidential elections results
Year	Republican	Democratic	Third Parties
2024	59.9% 330	38.1% 210	2.0% 8
2020	58.3% 371	41.4% 263	0.3% 2
2016	62.9% 254	33.9% 137	3.2% 13
2012	66.5% 337	160 31.6%	0.8% 4
2008	64.4% 372	33.7% 195	1.7% 10
2004	62.0% 512	36.4% 242	0.3% 2

In the 2013 gubernatorial election, Republican Chris Christie received 306 votes (76.1% vs. 60.3% countywide), ahead of Democrat Barbara Buono with 81 votes (20.1% vs. 34.9%) and other candidates with votes (0.0% vs. 1.3%), among the 402 ballots cast by the borough's 803 registered voters, yielding a 50.1% turnout (vs. 41.5% in the county). In the 2009 gubernatorial election, Republican Chris Christie received 280 votes (63.9% vs. 47.7% countywide), ahead of Democrat Jon Corzine with 135 votes (30.8% vs. 44.5%), Independent Chris Daggett with 14 votes (3.2% vs. 4.8%) and other candidates with 4 votes (0.9% vs. 1.2%), among the 438 ballots cast by the borough's 817 registered voters, yielding a 53.6% turnout (vs. 44.9% in the county).

United States Senate election results for Longport1
Year	Republican		Democratic		Third party(ies)	
Year	No.	%	No.	%	No.	%
2024	316	60.19%	207	39.43%	2	0.38%
2018	245	69.80%	97	27.64%	9	2.56%
2012	299	62.68%	171	35.85%	7	1.47%
2006	268	62.04%	156	36.11%	8	1.85%

United States Senate election results for Longport2
Year	Republican		Democratic		Third party(ies)	
Year	No.	%	No.	%	No.	%
2020	373	60.06%	244	39.29%	4	0.64%
2014	213	62.46%	124	36.36%	4	1.17%
2013	159	61.63%	95	36.82%	4	1.55%
2008	342	62.87%	194	35.66%	8	1.47%

== Education ==
For kindergarten through eighth grade, public school students from Longport attend the Margate City Schools in Margate City as part of a sending/receiving relationship. Longport is a non-operating school district that had 49 students in the Margate district and 8 in Atlantic City for high school as of 2010, operating with a three-member board of education that oversaw its relationships with its sending districts. As of the 2018–19 school year, the district, comprised of two schools, had an enrollment of 351 students and 48.8 classroom teachers (on an FTE basis), for a student–teacher ratio of 7.2:1. Schools in the district (with 2018–19 enrollment data from the National Center for Education Statistics) are William H. Ross III Elementary School 169 students in grades K–4 and Eugene A. Tighe Middle School with 181 students in grades 5–8.

Starting in the 2014–15 school year, public school students from Longport in grades 9–12 attend Ocean City High School as part of a sending/receiving relationship with the Ocean City School District; the Longport district, which is closer to Ocean City and would save significantly on tuition costs per student, received permission from the New Jersey Department of Education to end the relationship with Atlantic City. As of the 2018–19 school year, Ocean City High School had an enrollment of 1,245 students and 98.5 classroom teachers (on an FTE basis), for a student–teacher ratio of 12.6:1.

Through the 2013–14 school year, Longport's students had attended Atlantic City High School, along with those from Brigantine, Margate City and Ventnor City, as part of a sending/receiving relationship with the Atlantic City School District. The Longport Board of Education had investigated the possibility of offering city students the option of attending either Atlantic City High School or Ocean City High School, as part of an effort to control the costs for the average of ten Longport students sent to attend public high school annually. With the Atlantic City district charging tuition estimated at nearly $24,000 per student as of 2013–2014 and the Ocean City School District charging 25% less per student, district officials estimated prospective savings of $128,000 in the first five years, though those savings could disappear if more of the nearly two-thirds of students attending private high schools were to shift to choose the new Ocean City option. In June 2014, the Acting State Commissioner of Education approved the end of the relationship with the Atlantic City district under which Longport's students could start attending Ocean City High School starting with the 2014–2015 school year.

Borough public school students are also eligible to attend the Atlantic County Institute of Technology in the Mays Landing section of Hamilton Township or the Charter-Tech High School for the Performing Arts, located in Somers Point.

Private school options in the area include Holy Spirit High School in Absecon, under the Roman Catholic Diocese of Camden and St. Augustine Preparatory School, which is an all-boys Augustinian, Catholic college preparatory institution.

== Transportation ==
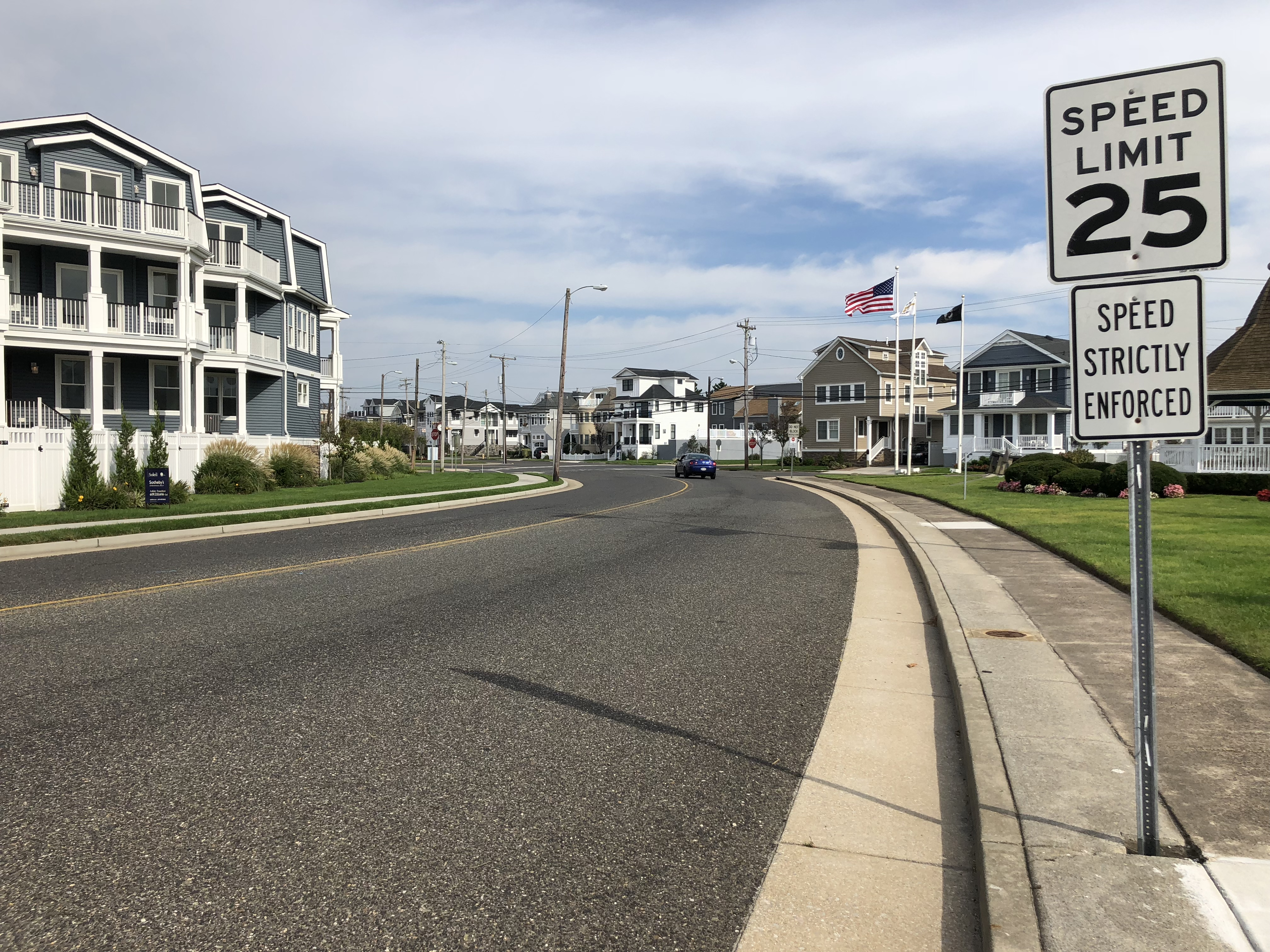
County Route 629 entering Longport

=== Roads and highways ===
As of May 2010, the borough had a total of 13.56 miles (21.82 km) of roadways, of which 12.78 miles (20.57 km) were maintained by the municipality and 0.78 miles (1.26 km) by Atlantic County.

No Interstate, U.S., state or major county highways directly serve Longport. The only numbered roads in Longport are minor county routes, such as County Route 629.

=== The Longport Bridge ===
There is access to and from the mainland and Ocean City by way of a series of bridges and causeways including the JFK Memorial Bridge, The Ocean City Bridge, and the Dolores G. Cooper Bridge, also known as Longport-Somers Point Boulevard.

=== Public transportation ===
NJ Transit provides bus service on the 505 route between the borough and Atlantic City.

== Climate ==
According to the Köppen climate classification system, Longport has a humid subtropical climate (Cfa) with hot, moderately humid summers, cool winters and year-around precipitation. Cfa climates are characterized by all months having an average mean temperature above 32.0 °F (0.0 °C), at least four months with an average mean temperature at or above 50.0 °F (10.0 °C), at least one month with an average mean temperature at or above 71.6 °F (22.0 °C) and no significant precipitation difference between seasons. During the summer months in Longport, a cooling afternoon sea breeze is present on most days, but episodes of extreme heat and humidity can occur with heat index values at or above 95.0 °F (35.0 °C). During the winter months, episodes of extreme cold and wind can occur with wind chill values below 0.0 °F (−17.8 °C). The plant hardiness zone at Longport Beach is 7b with an average annual extreme minimum air temperature of 7.0 °F (−13.9 °C). The average seasonal (November–April) snowfall total is 12 to 18 inches (30 to 46 cm), and the average snowiest month is February which corresponds with the annual peak in nor'easter activity.

Climate data for Longport Beach, NJ (1981–2010 Averages)
Month	Jan	Feb	Mar	Apr	May	Jun	Jul	Aug	Sep	Oct	Nov	Dec	Year
Mean daily maximum °F (°C)	41.4 (5.2)	43.5 (6.4)	50.2 (10.1)	59.7 (15.4)	68.9 (20.5)	77.8 (25.4)	82.6 (28.1)	81.4 (27.4)	76.0 (24.4)	65.4 (18.6)	56.0 (13.3)	46.3 (7.9)	62.5 (16.9)
Daily mean °F (°C)	33.7 (0.9)	35.7 (2.1)	42.1 (5.6)	51.5 (10.8)	60.7 (15.9)	70.1 (21.2)	75.3 (24.1)	74.1 (23.4)	68.1 (20.1)	57.3 (14.1)	48.0 (8.9)	38.6 (3.7)	54.7 (12.6)
Mean daily minimum °F (°C)	26.0 (−3.3)	28.0 (−2.2)	34.0 (1.1)	43.2 (6.2)	52.5 (11.4)	62.3 (16.8)	67.9 (19.9)	66.8 (19.3)	60.2 (15.7)	49.1 (9.5)	40.0 (4.4)	30.9 (−0.6)	46.8 (8.2)
Average precipitation inches (mm)	3.28 (83)	2.89 (73)	4.20 (107)	3.64 (92)	3.27 (83)	3.01 (76)	3.47 (88)	4.18 (106)	3.12 (79)	3.62 (92)	3.37 (86)	3.87 (98)	41.92 (1,065)
Average relative humidity (%)	68.1	66.7	63.5	63.9	68.6	72.4	72.6	74.8	72.9	71.6	69.8	68.4	69.5
Average dew point °F (°C)	24.3 (−4.3)	25.7 (−3.5)	30.6 (−0.8)	39.7 (4.3)	50.3 (10.2)	60.8 (16.0)	65.9 (18.8)	65.6 (18.7)	59.1 (15.1)	48.2 (9.0)	38.6 (3.7)	29.1 (−1.6)	44.9 (7.2)
Source: PRISM

Climate data for Atlantic City, NJ Ocean Water Temperature (6 NE Longport)
Month	Jan	Feb	Mar	Apr	May	Jun	Jul	Aug	Sep	Oct	Nov	Dec	Year
Daily mean °F (°C)	37 (3)	35 (2)	42 (6)	48 (9)	56 (13)	63 (17)	70 (21)	73 (23)	70 (21)	61 (16)	53 (12)	44 (7)	54 (12)
Source: NOAA

== Ecology ==
According to the A. W. Kuchler U.S. potential natural vegetation types, Longport would have a dominant vegetation type of Northern Cordgrass (73) with a dominant vegetation form of Coastal Prairie (20).

== Notable people ==
People who were born in, residents of, or otherwise closely associated with Longport include:

- Leland Beloff (born 1942), member of the Pennsylvania House of Representatives and the Philadelphia City Council who resigned from office after being convicted in Federal court on extortion charges
- Jack Crawford (born 1988), professional American football player for the Oakland Raiders
- Thomas Cruse (1857–1943), United States Army brigadier general who was a recipient of the Medal of Honor for valor in action in 1882 at the Battle of Big Dry Wash
- Louis Johanson (1929–2004), member of the Pennsylvania State Senate and the Philadelphia City Council who was convicted for accepting a bribe in the Abscam sting operation
- Howard Kupperman (1931–2014), politician who represented the 2nd Legislative District in the New Jersey General Assembly from 1976 to 1978 and served as the mayor of Longport from 1983 to 1992
- Heinie Miller (1893–1964), football player who played in the early years of the National Football League for the Buffalo All-Americans and the Milwaukee Badgers
- Sean Morey (born 1953), stand-up comedian and singer famous for songs such as "The Man Song", "A Hairy Ass" and "Dear Santa"
- Paul Steelman (born 1955), architect
- James Tate (1910–1983), mayor of Philadelphia from 1962 to 1972

Preceded by Margate City	Beaches of New Jersey	Succeeded by Ocean City
