= Ocean City High School =

Place in Cape May County, New Jersey, US

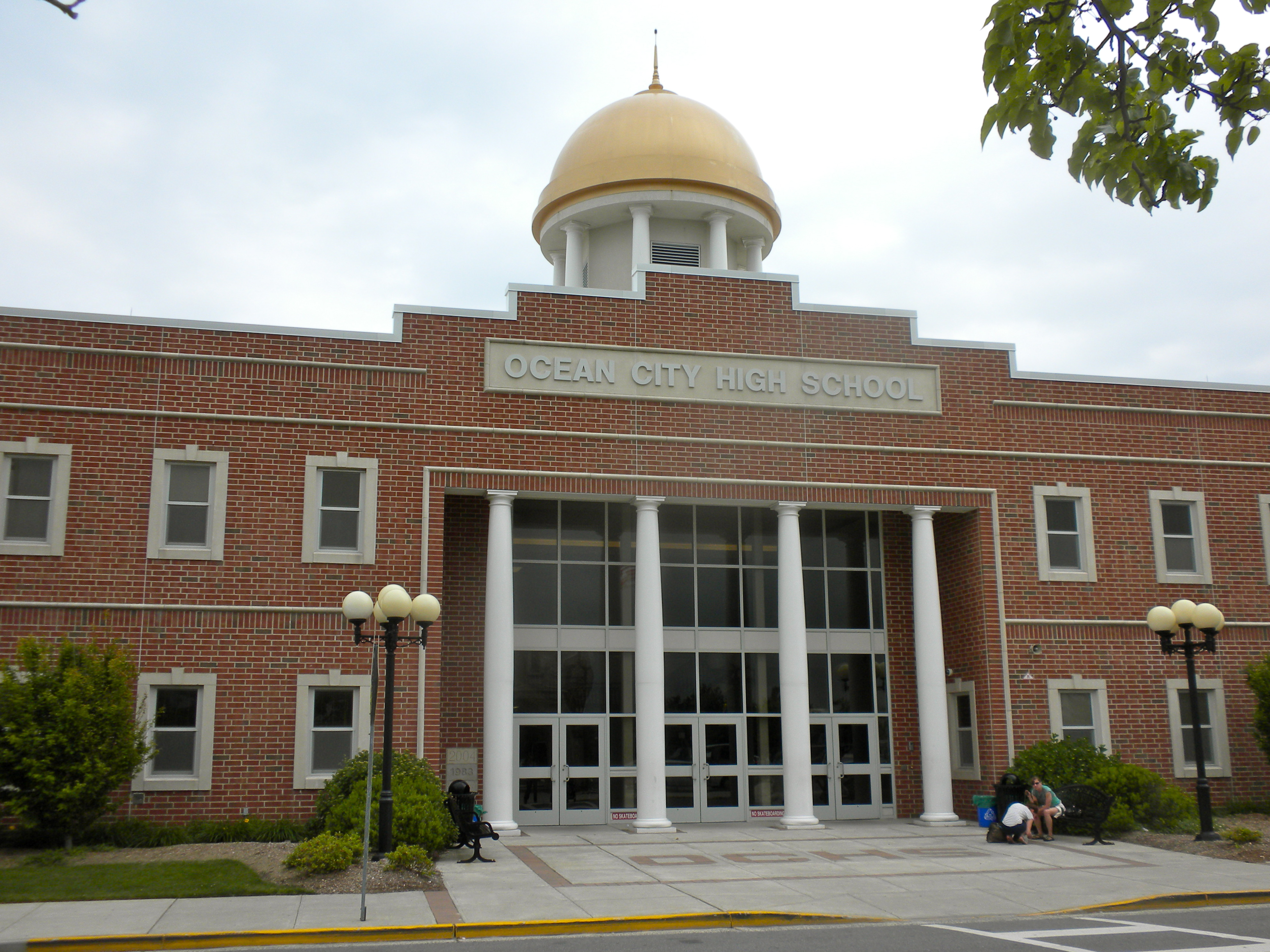
- Ocean City High School in May 2010

Location
- 501 Atlantic Avenue; Ocean City, New Jersey 08226; United States; 39.280598°N 74.567526°W

Information
- Type: Public
- Established: 1904
- School district: Ocean City School District
- NCES School ID: 341197001746
- Principal: Wendy O'Neal
- Faculty: 126.4 FTEs
- Grades: 9-12
- Enrollment: 1,190 (as of 2023–24)
- Student to teacher ratio: 9.4:1
- Colors: Red and white
- Athletics conference: Cape-Atlantic League (general); West Jersey Football League (football)
- Team name: Red Raiders
- Rival: Mainland Regional High School
- Website: www.ocsdnj.org/o/ochs

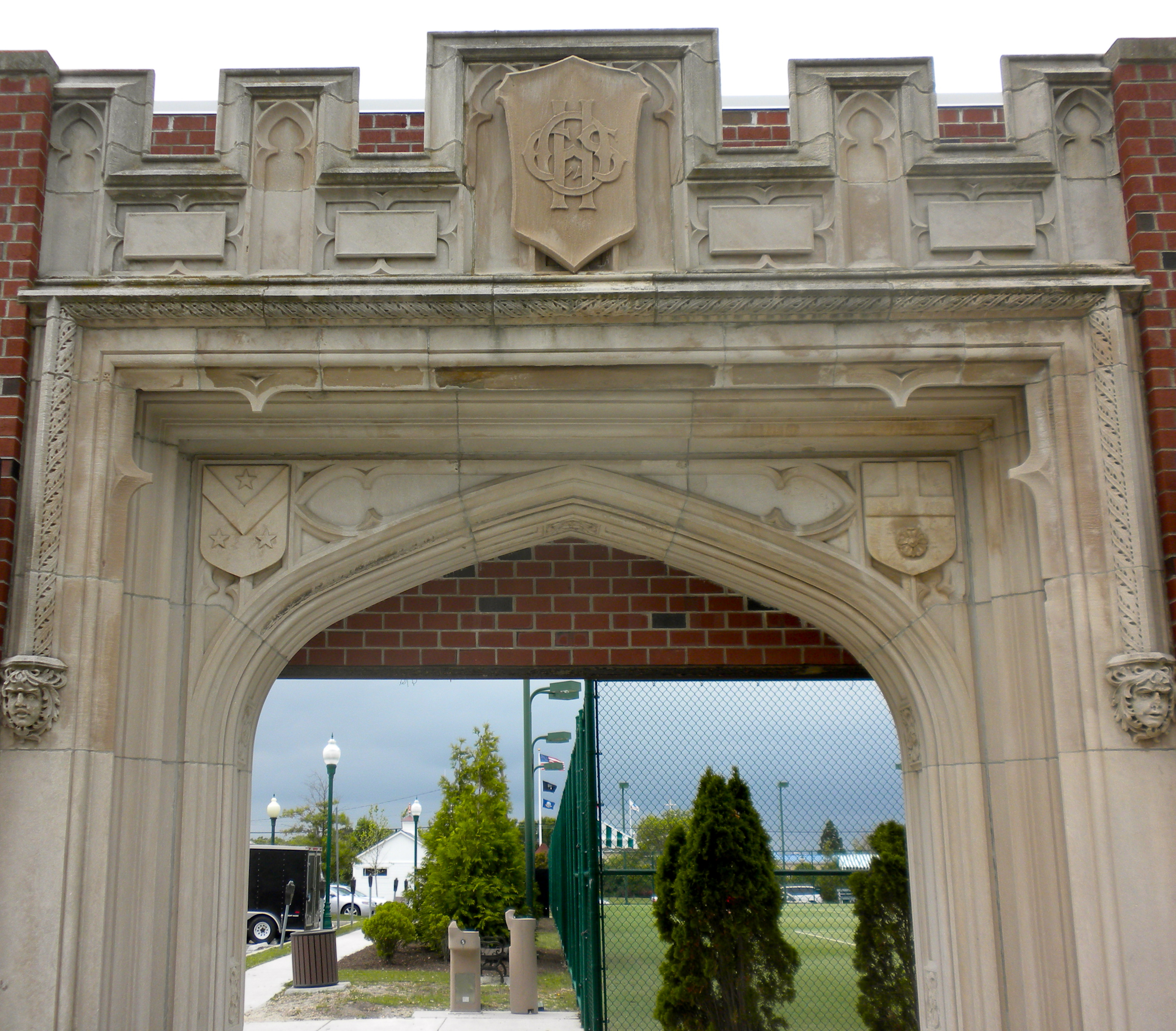
Preserved entrance to the demolished 1924 building.

Ocean City High School (OCHS) is a four-year comprehensive public high school located in Ocean City, in the U.S. state of New Jersey, serving students in ninth through twelfth grades as the lone secondary school of the Ocean City School District. Students from the Corbin City, Longport, Sea Isle City and Upper Township school districts attend Ocean City High School as part of sending/receiving relationships.

As of the 2023–24 school year, the school had an enrollment of 1,190 students and 126.4 classroom teachers (on an FTE basis), for a student–teacher ratio of 9.4:1. There were 135 students (11.3% of enrollment) eligible for free lunch and 17 (1.4% of students) eligible for reduced-cost lunch.

As of 2015 about 60% of students in Ocean City High School were from Upper Township.

The school is fully accredited by the New Jersey Department of Education.

== History ==
In 1883, the first school in Ocean City was built in 1883 between 8th and 9th Streets on Central Avenue, serving Kindergarten to High School. The first graduating class of six students was in 1904. A separate elementary school was built in 1913, causing the original Central Avenue to become the sole building for the high school. In 1923, a new high school was built between 5th and 6th Streets on Atlantic and Ocean Avenue, and the original facility became the city's police department and municipal court. The high school on Atlantic Avenue expanded in 1967, and again in 1983. By 1995, the Ocean City School Board decided that the 1923 facility was outdated and failed to meet state efficiency standards. After two failed referendums on expanding the school, a referendum in 2001 passed to build a new high school, having secured $11.5 million in state funding (equivalent to $20.9 million in 2025). The new facility opened in 2004, and the original high school from 1923 was demolished in 2005 apart from the main entrance. The main entrance of the original building can still be seen on Atlantic Avenue.

In September 1959, the three sending districts of Linwood, Northfield and Somers Point were notified by the Ocean City School District that overcrowding would mean that it would no longer be able to continue accepting students from the communities at Ocean City High School starting in the 1959-60 school year. When Mainland Regional High School opened for the 1961-62 school year, rising seniors from the communities were given the option to complete their schooling at Ocean City High School.

An observatory was built at the school in 2012, with a telescope capable of 700x magnification.

== Awards, recognition, and rankings ==
In the 2011 "Ranking America's High Schools" issue by The Washington Post, the school was ranked 67th in New Jersey and 1,938th nationwide. In Newsweek's May 22, 2007 issue, ranking the country's top high schools, Ocean City High School was listed in 1210th place, the 41st-highest ranked school in New Jersey.

In its 2013 report on "America's Best High Schools", The Daily Beast ranked the school 872nd in the nation among participating public high schools and 65th among schools in New Jersey.

The school was the 118th-ranked public high school in New Jersey out of 339 schools statewide in New Jersey Monthly magazine's September 2014 cover story on the state's "Top Public High Schools", using a new ranking methodology. The school had been ranked 63rd in the state of 328 schools in 2012, after being ranked 99th in 2010 out of 322 schools listed. The magazine ranked the school 110th in 2008 out of 316 schools. The school was ranked 93rd in the magazine's September 2006 issue, which surveyed 316 schools across the state. Schooldigger.com ranked the school 154th out of 381 public high schools statewide in its 2011 rankings (a decrease of 53 positions from the 2010 ranking) which were based on the combined percentage of students classified as proficient or above proficient on the mathematics (83.2%) and language arts literacy (93.5%) components of the High School Proficiency Assessment (HSPA).

== Facility ==
Ocean City High School's first graduating class, in 1904, consisted of six students, who attended a school building located at Central Avenue between 8th and 9th streets. A new building was constructed at the site that served as the high school until 1924. The second OCHS building was constructed between 5th and 6th Streets and Atlantic and Ocean Avenues, by Vivian B. Smith, an architect and OCHS alumnus, and was expanded in 1963 with north and south wings added. After 1961, students from Somers Point and Linwood no longer attended the high school. A 1982 renovation project replaced and renovated the front portion of the old building.

In December 2001, voters approved construction of the current facility on Atlantic Avenue between 5th and 6th streets. Construction began in 2004 and the new building was finished for the 2004–05 school year. The old building was gradually torn down and replaced by parking and tennis courts. A Neo-Gothic entrance arch is the only remnant of the previous structure.

== Athletics ==
The Ocean City High School Red Raiders compete in the Atlantic Division of the Cape-Atlantic League, an athletic conference comprised of public and private high schools located in Atlantic, Cape May, Cumberland and Gloucester counties, operating under the aegis of the New Jersey State Interscholastic Athletic Association (NJSIAA). With 932 students in grades 10-12, the school was classified by the NJSIAA for the 2019–20 school year as Group III for most athletic competition purposes, which included schools with an enrollment of 761 to 1,058 students in that grade range. The football team competes in the Independence Division of the 94-team West Jersey Football League superconference and was classified by the NJSIAA as Group III South for football for 2024–2026, which included schools with 695 to 882 students.

The school has many athletic teams and extracurricular activities. Carey Stadium is used for Ocean City High School's football team. Soccer and lacrosse are played at the Tennessee Avenue fields. The school also has baseball, wrestling, tennis, field hockey, swimming, crew, cross country, track and many other teams.

The boys' basketball team won the Group I state championship in 1955 (defeating runner-up North Arlington High School in the finals of the playoff) and won the Group II title in 1964 (also against North Arlington). In the first appearance in the finals in program history, the 1955 team came back from eight points behind in the fourth quarter of the Group I finals at the Elizabeth Armory to take the game into overtime and win 58-56 against North Arlington. In March 1964, under coach Fred "Dixie" Howell at Boardwalk Hall in Atlantic City, the OCHS basketball team won the Group II state championship with a 76–51 against North Arlington in the tournament final. During their championship run they won every game by 20 points or more.

The football team won the NJSIAA South Jersey state sectional championships in 1984 (Group III), 1996 (Group IV) and in both 1998 and 1999 (Group III). A crowd of 2,500 watched the 1984 championship game, as the team won the South Jersey Group IV state sectional title with a 22-21 defeat of Willingboro High School on a fourth-quarter touchdown that gave Ocean City the margin of victory. In 1996, the football team won the South Jersey, Group IV state title, completing a perfect season which included a 6–5 victory over arch-rival Mainland Regional High School. In 1998, after moving back down to Group III, they won the title again, beating Toms River High School South in the championship game played at Rutgers Stadium. The Red Raiders went 11–1, with their only defeat coming in the closing moments against Millville High School. In 1999, the football team successfully defended their title, winning the South Jersey Group III championship by beating previously undefeated Mainland Regional in the championship game, played at Rutgers Stadium, winning by a score of 21-18.

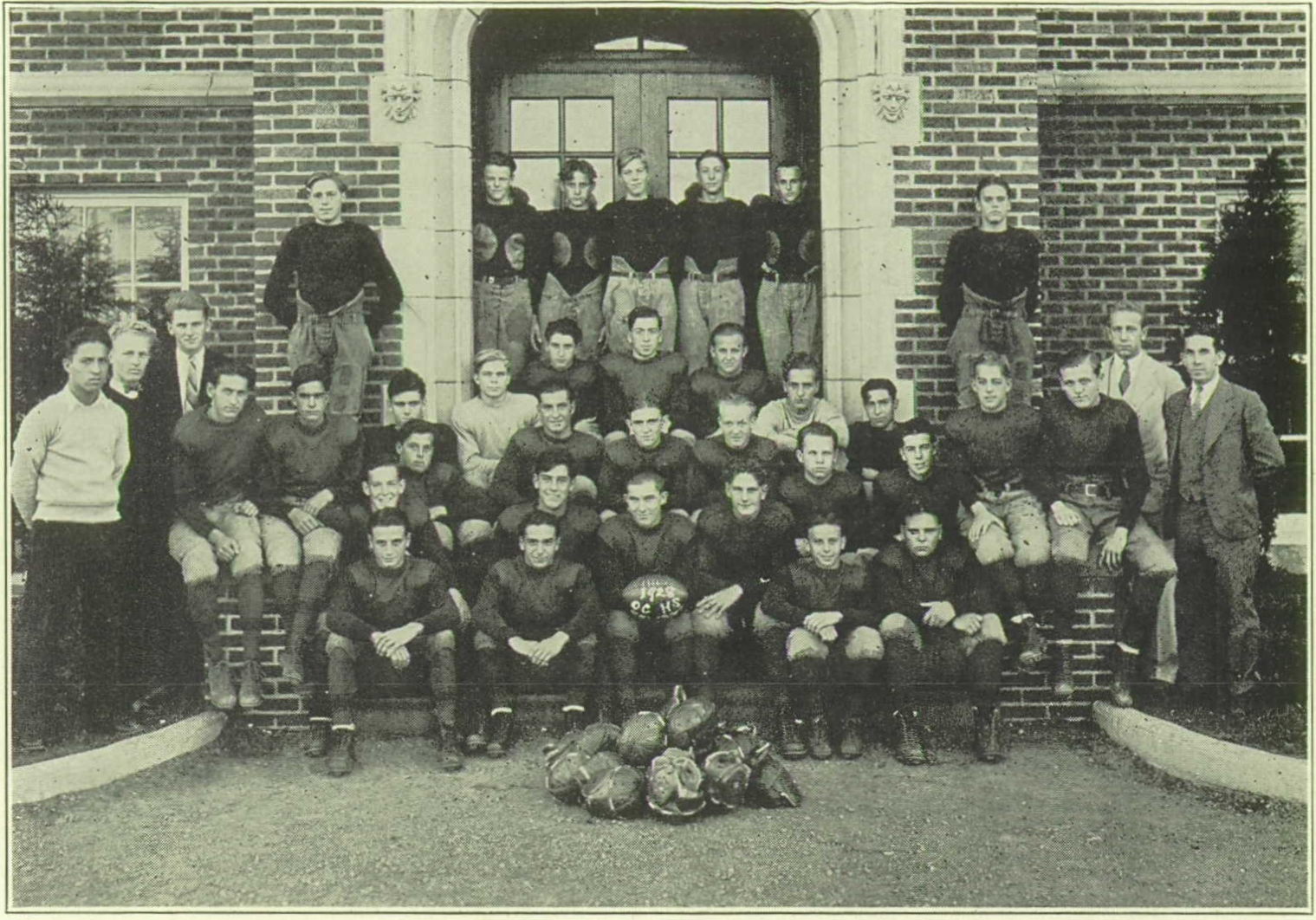
1929 Ocean City High School football team

The girls cross country running team won the Group III state championship in 1988.

The 1989 softball team finished the season with a 19-6 record after defeating Paramus High School by a score of 3-1 in the tournament final at Trenton State College to win the Group III state championship.

The girls' outdoor track and field team won the Group III state championship in 1992 and 1994.

The girls' track team won the Group III state indoor relay championship in 1995.

The boys' soccer team won the Group III state championship in 1995 (as co-champions with Scotch Plains-Fanwood High School), in 1999 (as co-champion with Ramapo High School), in 2000 (as co-champion with West Morris Central High School), in 2003 (vs. Ramapo) and 2005 (vs. Scotch Plains-Fanwood). The team won the 2003 Group III state championship, defeating Ramapo High School by a score of 1–0 in the tournament final. The team won the NJSIAA South Jersey Group III 2004 sectional title with a 3–1 win against Delsea Regional High School. The team won again in 2005, defeating Lacey Township High School 5–0. The team then moved on to the state semifinals and final, defeating Scotch Plains-Fanwood High School 2-0 in the Group III championship game. The team was ranked number one in the state in 2005 by The Star-Ledger. In 2007, the boys soccer team won the South Jersey Group III state sectional championship with a 5-1 win over Kingsway Regional High School in the tournament final. The team won back-to-back South Jersey Group III championships in 2013 and 2014 with wins of 2–0 vs. Timber Creek Regional High School and Toms River High School South, respectively, before losing in the 2015 South Jersey sectional final to Toms River South 2–1.

The field hockey team has won Group III state championship in 1997, 1998, 1999, 2001, 2002, 2005, 2009, 2012, 2013 and 2016. The nine state championships are tied for the seventh-most of any high school in the state. In 2005, the field hockey team won the South Jersey Group III state sectional championship with a 1–0 double-overtime win against Kingsway Regional High School in the tournament final, after losing twice in the two previous years to Kingsway in the tournament final. The team moved on to win the 2005 Group III state championship with a pair of 2–1 wins against Moorestown High School in the semifinals and Ridge High School in the finals. The 2009 team defeated Warren Hills High School by 2-1 in overtime to win the Group III state title. In 2012, the Raiders won the Group III state championship title with a 2–0 win against Warren Hills High School. In 2013, the team won the Group III state title again against Warren Hills High School by a score of 1–0 in double overtime in a game that was goal-less until a corner was called (with no time on the clock), and the Raiders scored.

The boys' track team won the indoor track Group III state championship in 2011.

The girls' basketball team won the Group III state title in 2013 (defeating Jefferson Township High School in the final game of the tournament) and with the group finals cancelled in 2020 due to COVID-19, the team was declared South Group III regional champion.

In 2013, the Red Raiders baseball team finished the season with a school win record of 23–4, including a Cape Atlantic League record 20 consecutive victories, and won the National Conference title, the program's first conference championship since 2000. They reached the South Jersey Group III state sectional finals against Burlington Township High School but lost by a score of 2–0.

Also in 2013, the Ocean City High School Freshman Eight boys crew team won their first Stotesbury Cup Regatta Gold. This event is the world's oldest and largest high school regatta.

The girls' swimming team won the Public Group B South state sectional championship in 2014-2017 and won the Public B state title in 2016.

The girls' soccer team won the Group III state championship in 2019, defeating runner-up Ramapo High School by a 3-0 score in the tournament final.

Ocean City plans to rename its gym in honor of Coach "Dixie" Howell, who died in 1988. In addition to his 17 years as Ocean City High School's athletic director, Howell also coached baseball, tennis and football. In 15 years as the OCHS basketball coach, he led the team to a 309-78 record, two state championships (1955 & 1964) and three South Jersey championships.

== Administration ==
The school's principal is Wendy O'Neal. Her core administration includes the two assistant principals and the athletic director.

== Controversy ==
In February 2022, members of the girls’ basketball team asked the school board not to reappoint the basketball coach and intermediate school teacher, Michael Cappelletti, after there were accusations of abusive coaching. He only served as head coach for one season after previously serving as assistant coach. In May of that year, the school board voted to not renew his contract.

== Notable alumni ==
- Marla Adams (1938–2024, class of 1956), actress who appeared on the soap operas The Secret Storm and The Young and the Restless
- Doug Colman (born 1973), former NFL linebacker
- Frank J. Esposito (born 1941, class of 1959), academic administrator at Kean University
- Robert J. Garagiola (born 1972), politician who represented District 15 in north-western Montgomery County in the Maryland Senate
- Archie Harris (1918–1965, class of 1937), discus thrower and football player
- Anne Heche (born 1969), actress
- Kurt Loder (born 1945), journalist, author and television personality
- Antwan McClellan (class of 1993), politician who has represented the 1st Legislative District in the New Jersey General Assembly since 2020
- Chad Severs (born 1982), men's professional soccer player and New Jersey's second all-time leading prep scorer
- Gay Talese (born 1932), author
- Roland Wiggins (1932–2019, class of 1949), musicologist
- Adam Williamson (born 1984), first Ocean City alumnus to be drafted into Major League Soccer
