= Ocean City School District =

School district in Cape May County, New Jersey, US

Address
- 501 Atlantic Avenue Ocean City, Cape May County, New Jersey, 08226; United States
- Coordinates: 39.280598°N 74.567526°W

District information
- Grades: PreK-12
- Superintendent: Christian Angelillo
- Business administrator: Timothy E. Kelley
- Schools: 3

Students and staff
- Enrollment: 1,877 (as of 2022–23)
- Faculty: 218.8 FTEs
- Student–teacher ratio: 8.6:1

Other information
- District Factor Group: DE
- Website: www.ocsdnj.org
Ind.	Per pupil	District spending	Rank (*)	K-12 average	%± vs. average
1A	Total Spending	$21,285	62	$18,891	12.7%
1	Budgetary Cost	16,920	64	14,783	14.5%
2	Classroom Instruction	10,648	64	8,763	21.5%
6	Support Services	2,218	45	2,392	−7.3%
8	Administrative Cost	1,527	35	1,485	2.8%
10	Operations & Maintenance	1,968	59	1,783	10.4%
13	Extracurricular Activities	555	63	268	107.1%
16	Median Teacher Salary	86,772	67	64,043
Data from NJDoE 2014 Taxpayers' Guide to Education Spending. *Of K-12 districts with 1,800-3,500 students. Lowest spending=1; Highest=68

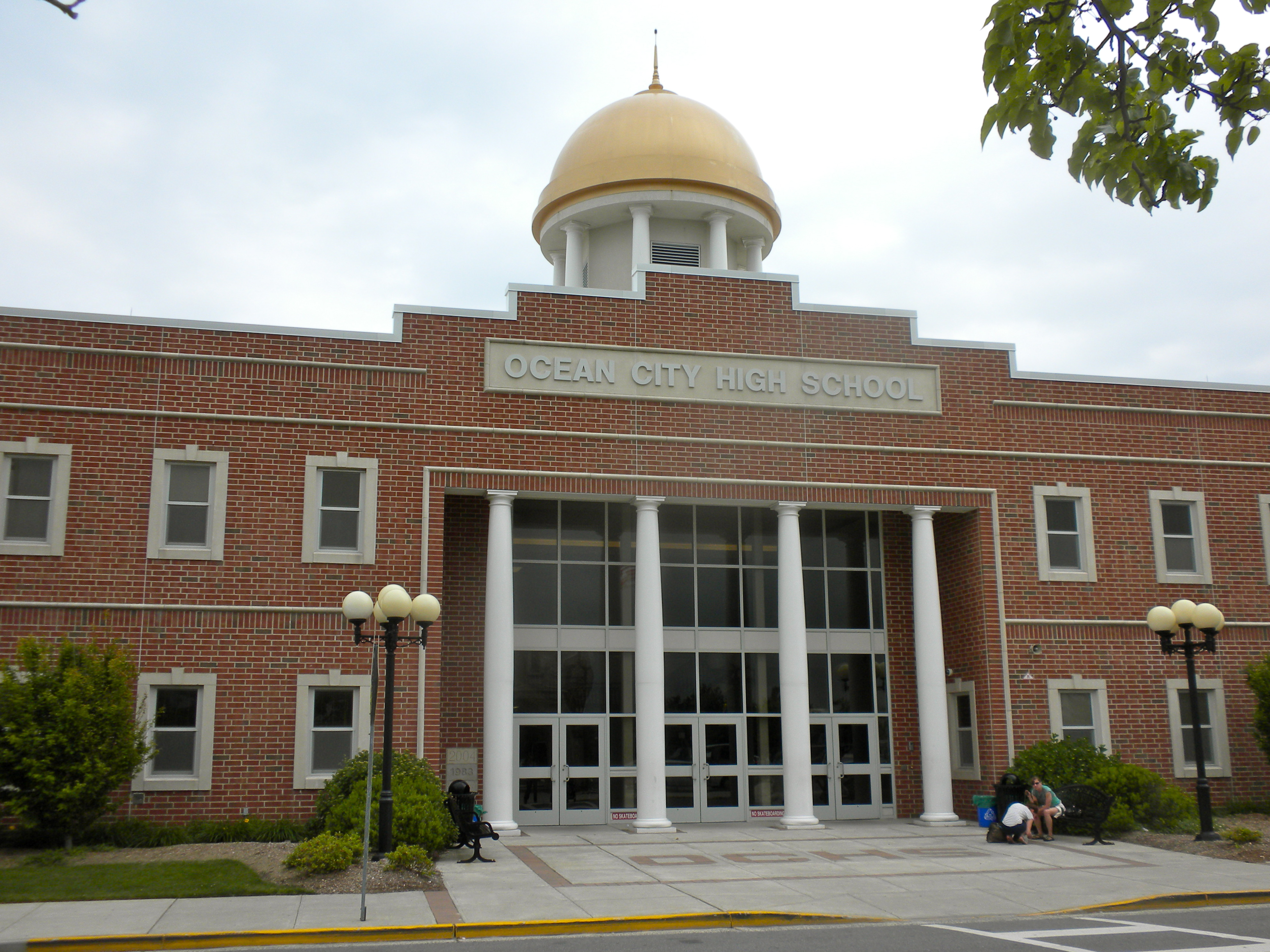
Ocean City High School

The Ocean City School District is a comprehensive community public school district that serves students in pre-kindergarten through twelfth grade from Ocean City, in Cape May County, in the U.S. state of New Jersey.

As of the 2022–23 school year, the district, comprised of three schools, had an enrollment of 1,877 students and 218.8 classroom teachers (on an FTE basis), for a student–teacher ratio of 8.6:1.

Public school students for all grade levels from the Sea Isle City School District, a non-operating school district (meaning it does not operate any schools) covering Sea Isle City, are sent to Ocean City School District. Additionally, public school students from Corbin City, Longport, and Upper Township attend Ocean City High School for ninth through twelfth grades as part of sending/receiving relationships with their respective school districts.

The district participates in the Interdistrict Public School Choice Program, which allows non-resident students to attend school in the district at no cost to their parents, with tuition covered by the resident district. Available slots are announced annually by grade.

== History ==
By 1948, schools in Ocean City were racially integrated. At the time all teachers were white.

Merger discussions with the Sea Isle City School District in 2008 ended after the Ocean City district indicated that it did want to accept Sea Isle City's tenured teachers, which it would be required to do under state law. Sea Isle City currently spends $35,000 per student and hoped to see savings through the merger, even after adding in transportation costs. The Sea Isle City district graduated its last eighth grade class in June 2009 and with the 2010-11 school year, students from Sea Isle City started attending the Ocean City schools starting in fifth grade. As of June 30, 2012, Sea Isle City School District no longer operates any schools, in the face of an order by the commissioner of the New Jersey Department of Education that was based on declining enrollment and budgetary issues. All students from Sea Isle City in public school for pre-Kindergarten through twelfth grade attend Ocean City Public Schools.

The district had been classified by the New Jersey Department of Education as being in District Factor Group "DE", the fifth-highest of eight groupings. District Factor Groups organize districts statewide to allow comparison by common socioeconomic characteristics of the local districts. From lowest socioeconomic status to highest, the categories are A, B, CD, DE, FG, GH, I and J.

== Schools ==
Schools in the district (with 2022–23 enrollment data from the National Center for Education Statistics) are:

Elementary schools

- Ocean City Primary School with 280 students in grades PreK-3
  - Cathleen Smith, principal
- Ocean City Intermediate School with 370 students in grades 4-8
  - Matthew Engle, principal

High school

- Ocean City High School with 1,215 students in grades 9-12
  - Wendy O'Neal, principal

== Administration ==
Core members of the district's administration are:

- Christian Angelillo, superintendent
- Timothy E. Kelley, business administrator and board secretary

== Board of education ==
The district's board of education is comprised of nine elected members, plus three appointed representatives from Upper Township, who set policy and oversee the fiscal and educational operation of the district through its administration. As a Type II school district, the board's nine trustees from Ocean City are elected directly by Ocean City's voters to serve three-year terms of office on a staggered basis, with three seats up for election each year held (since 2012) as part of the November general election. Members from Upper Township and non-voting members from Longport and Sea Isle City are appointed by their districts to one-year terms of office. The board appoints a superintendent to oversee the district's day-to-day operations and a business administrator to supervise the business functions of the district.
