= Ocean City Municipal Airport =

Ocean City Municipal Airport may refer to:

- Ocean City Municipal Airport (Maryland) in Ocean City, Maryland, United States
- Ocean City Municipal Airport (New Jersey) in Ocean City, New Jersey, United States
