= 10th Street station =

10th Street station or Tenth Street station may refer to:

- 10th Street station (Metro Transit), a light rail stop in Saint Paul, Minnesota
- Tenth Street Promenade station, an automated people mover station in Miami, Florida
- 9–10th & Locust station, a subway station in Philadelphia, Pennsylvania
- Ocean City Tenth Street Station, a former railway station in Ocean City, New Jersey, United States

== See also ==
- 10th Avenue station (disambiguation)
