= Ocean City 34th Street Station =

34th Street
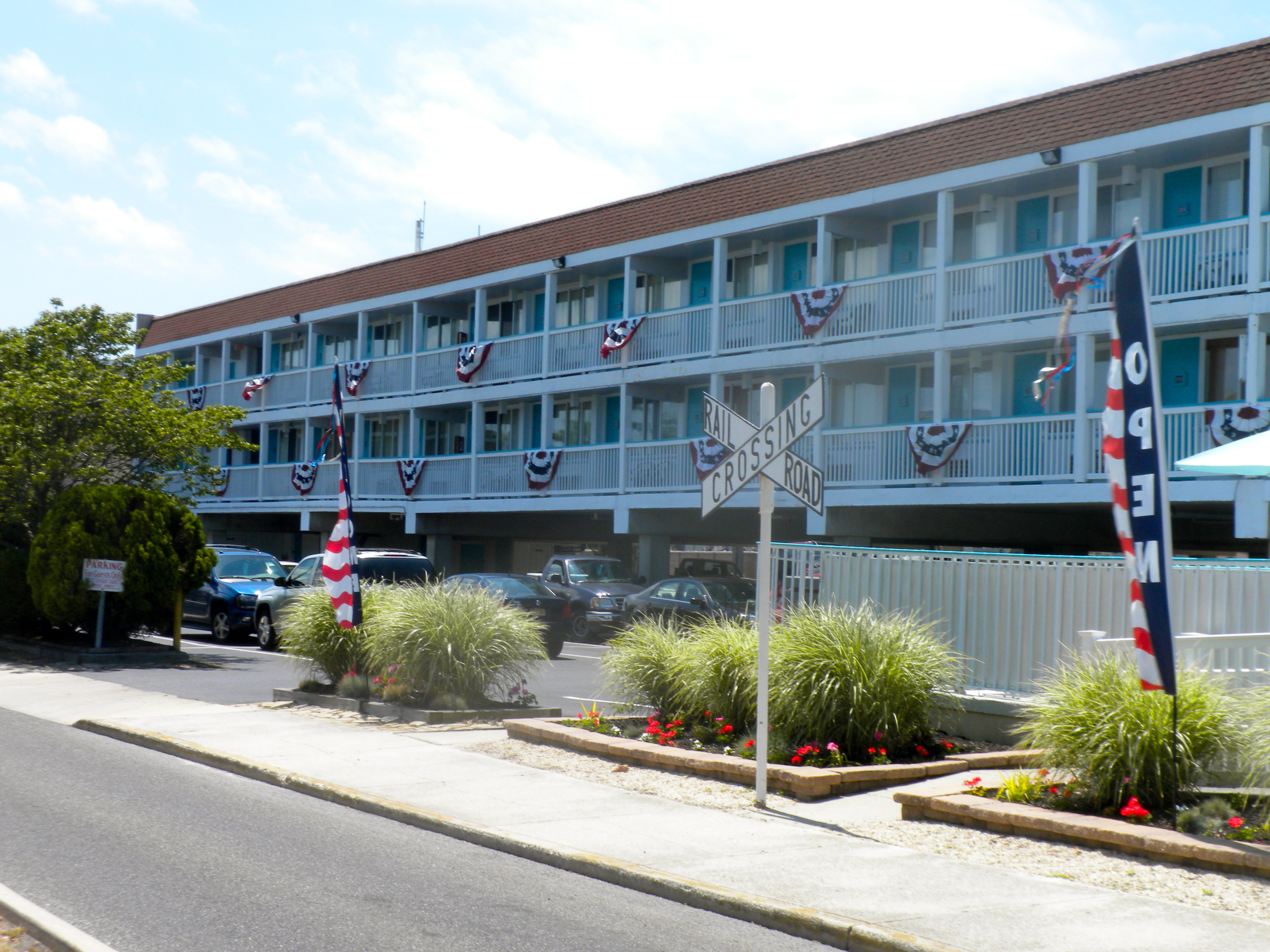
- A motel, adjacent to the former location of the train station.

General information
- Line: Seashore Line

History
- Closed: August 13, 1981

Former services
Preceding station	Pennsylvania-Reading Seashore Lines	Following station
Ocean City 51st Street toward Tuckahoe	ACRR Ocean City Branch	Ocean City 14th Street toward Ocean City Gardens
- Ocean City 34th Street Station
- U.S. National Register of Historic Places
- New Jersey Register of Historic Places
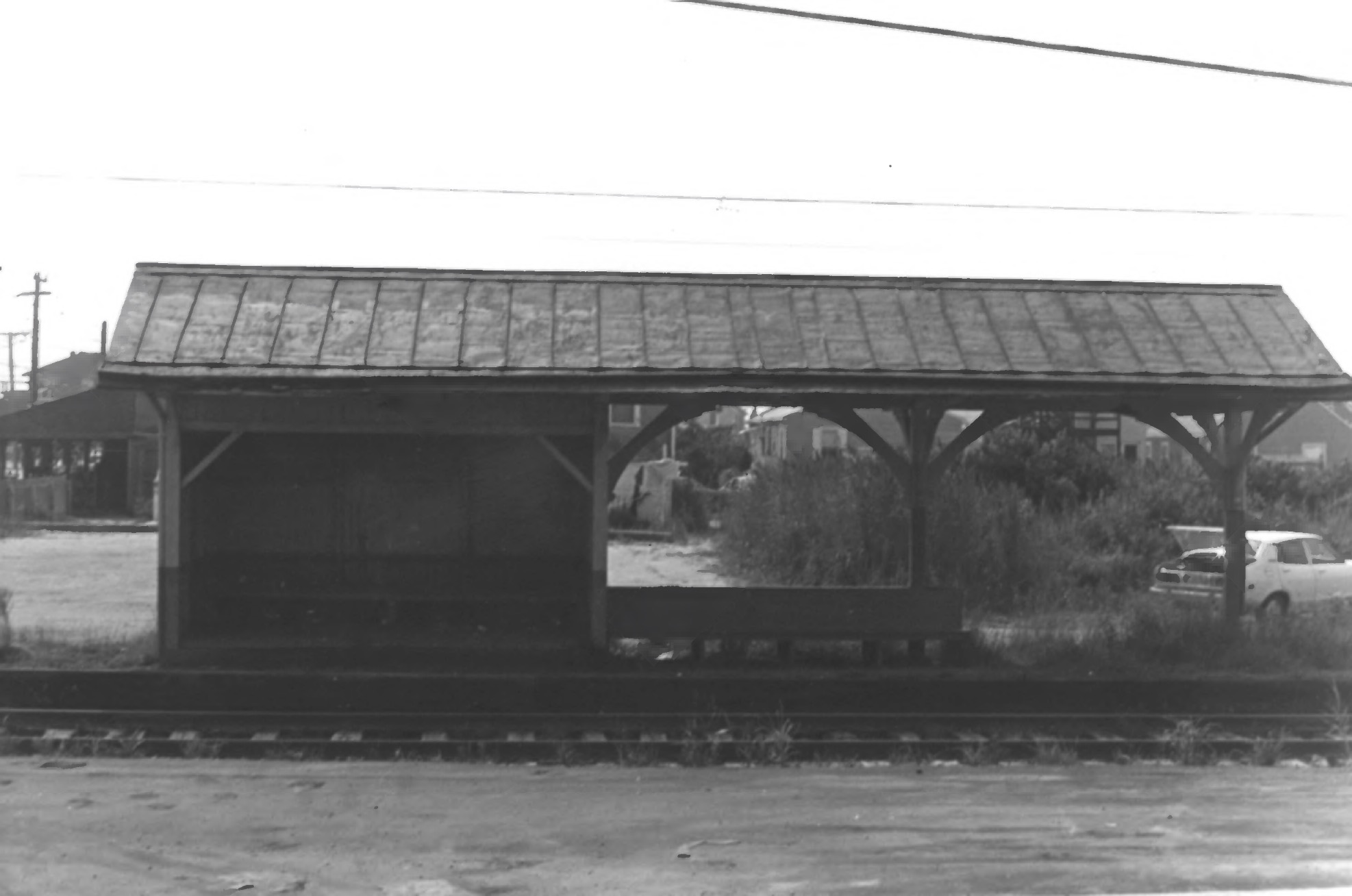
- Photo from 1978

- Location within Cape May County, New Jersey Location within New Jersey Location within the United States
- Location: Haven Avenue near 34th Street, Ocean City, New Jersey
- Coordinates: 39°15′6″N 74°36′49″W
- Built: c. 1885
- Architectural style: Stick/Eastlake
- MPS: Operating Passenger Railroad Stations TR
- NRHP reference No.: 84002613
- NJRHP No.: 1011

Significant dates
- Added to NRHP: June 22, 1984
- Designated NJRHP: March 17, 1984
Location

The Ocean City 34th Street Station was located in Ocean City, Cape May County, New Jersey, United States. The station — a small wooden shelter with bench seating for a few passengers, located just south of 34th Street next to a rail line running down the middle of Haven Avenue — was built in 1897 by the Ocean City Railroad, which was acquired by the Atlantic City Railroad in 1901, and later by the Pennsylvania-Reading Seashore Lines. Trains last served the station in August 1981, when service was cancelled due to poor track conditions and limited funding from the New Jersey Department of Transportation.

The station was added to the National Register of Historic Places on June 22, 1984, for its significance in architecture and transportation. It was subsequently damaged beyond repair when a truck backed into it, and thus demolished.

== See also ==
- Operating Passenger Railroad Stations Thematic Resource (New Jersey)
- National Register of Historic Places listings in Cape May County, New Jersey
- Ocean City Tenth Street Station
