= Beach tag =

Admission pass required to access a beach

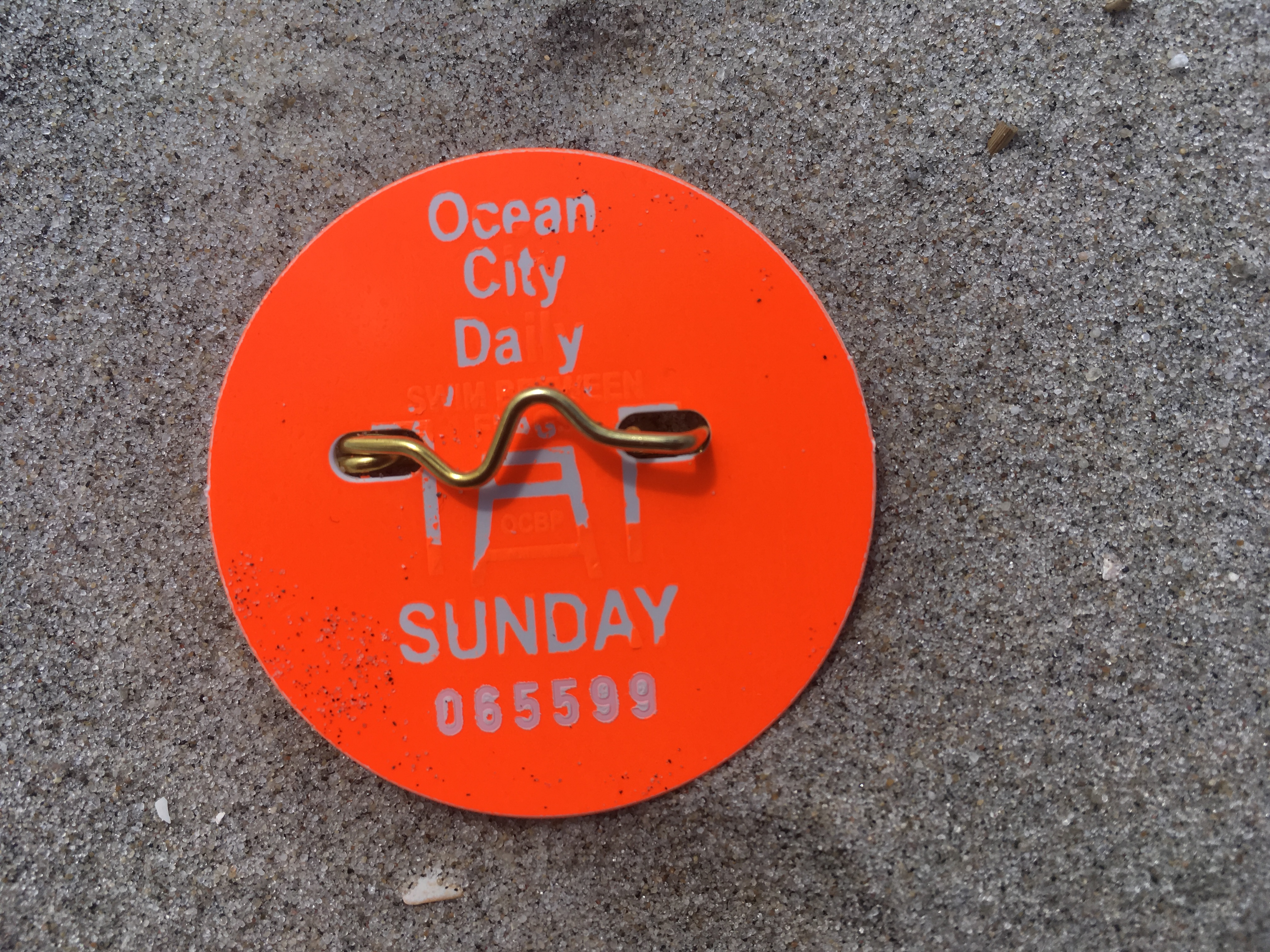
Beach tag from Ocean City, New Jersey

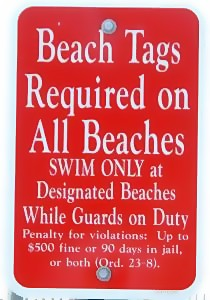
A sign telling visitors that beach tags are required in order to use Cape May, New Jersey's beaches.

A beach tag (also beach badge, beach pass, or beach token) is an admission pass that must be purchased to access a beach. It is commonly associated with the Jersey Shore in the U.S. state of New Jersey, where many communities restrict summer beach access to residents and visitors who pay a fee for a daily, weekly, or seasonal pass. Beaches with a beach-tag program use the proceeds to offset the maintenance and staffing costs associated with running a beach, such as funding lifeguards, restrooms, and trash removal.

== History ==
Beach tags for New Jersey beaches can be traced back to 1937 when some towns in the northern portion of the Jersey Shore such as Seaside Heights had brass beach badges marked by gender. Surf City on Long Beach Island started requiring beach tags in 1967. Stone Harbor became the first municipality in the southern portion of the Jersey Shore to require beach tags in 1971, and Sea Isle City followed suit in 1972. In Ocean City, beach tags were implemented in 1976, although discussions for beach fees in the city date back to the 1930s. Long Beach Township on Long Beach Island approved beach tags on November 5, 1976. In 2021, the Cape May County municipalities of Wildwood, North Wildwood, Wildwood Crest, and Upper Township - four of the five municipalities in New Jersey which do not have beach tags - were considering implementing them. On August 24, 2026, Upper Township approved a beach tag ordinance for the beaches in the Strathmere section of the township.

== Pricing ==
Daily, weekly, and seasonal tags can usually be purchased at participating beaches, and each municipality sets its own rates and policies. Beaches typically do not charge for children under the age of 12 and may offer discounts to seniors. In certain municipalities, discounts are given for seasonal passes purchased before a specific date (e.g., May 15 in Seaside Heights).

The beach tag offered by one municipality may not grant access to beaches in other municipalities. For example, Long Beach Island, which is about twenty miles long, comprises six municipalities, each with its own beach tags, and beach-goers cannot purchase a tag in one Long Beach Island municipality and use it in another.

== Criticism ==
The goals of beach tags, or tokens, are to either restrict the beach to only community members, or to generate user fees for lifeguards and maintenance (e.g., trash removal). On the Jersey Shore, beach tags are controversial because the public trust doctrine generally gives the public the right to access the intertidal zone, and guests may feel that a beach with beach tags should offer a superior service to free beaches. Additionally, detractors debate whether beach tags are actually to restrict beach use to people who are paying visitors of hotels, beach house rentals, and local residents.

Proponents of beach tags suggest that they improve the cleanliness and safety of the beaches, making the tag fees akin to user fees that prevent freeloading. In addition, proponents note that the beaches which require beach tags are those located in smaller municipalities, which because of beach tags are permitted to offer a similar product to the larger municipalities.

== New Jersey municipalities that do not require beach tags ==
The following municipalities did not require beach tags as of the 2015 beach season:

- Atlantic City
- North Wildwood
- Strathmere (Upper Township)
- Wildwood
- Wildwood Crest

Beaches are also free at Corson's Inlet State Park, Island Beach State Park, and Sandy Hook, although the latter two locations have vehicle entrance fees.

== Other places ==
In Evanston, Illinois, "beach tokens" may be required for entrance to the beach for people and even pets. The beach tokens are often made of metal or other durable material, to enable them to withstand swimming. The bearer may either carry them, or wear them around their neck or on their swimsuit.

The Village of Island Park and the city of Long Beach in Nassau County, New York issue beach tags for the use of their beaches.
