= Mayors of Ocean City, New Jersey =

American municipal office

Mayor of the City of Ocean City
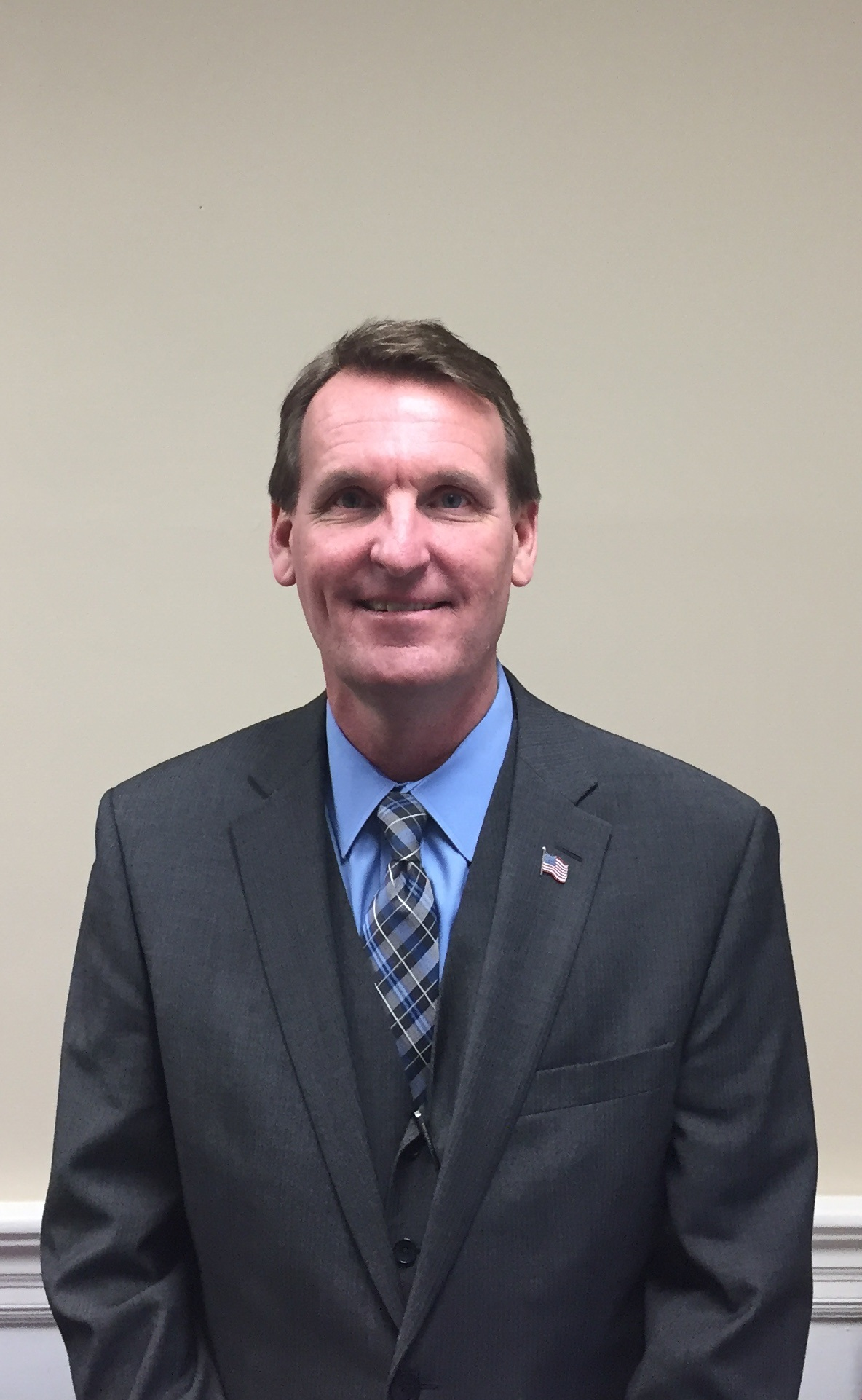
- Incumbent; Jay Gillian since 2010
- Type: Mayor–council
- Status: Active
- Term length: Four years
- Formation: 1884
- First holder: Gainer P. Moore
- Website: www.ocnj.us

The mayor of the City of Ocean City is the head of the executive branch of government of Ocean City, New Jersey, United States.

Since Ocean City was chartered as a borough in 1884, 22 individuals have held the office of mayor. Four mayors served two or more non-consecutive terms. Gainer P. Moore was the inaugural mayor of the city, who served on three occasions for a total of ten years. The current mayor is Jay Gillian, who was first elected in May 2010, and re-elected in 2014, 2018, and 2022.

== History ==
Beginning in 1879, when the Lake Brothers founded a Christian retreat on the island, the Ocean City Association handled official business, which continued in this capacity until 1884. Based on a referendum on April 30, 1884, the borough of Ocean City was formed from portions of Upper Township, following an act of the New Jersey Legislature on May 3, 1884. At this time, the town was governed by a mayor and four members of a city council. On March 31, 1890, the borough of Ocean City was reincorporated. On March 25, 1897, Ocean City was again reincorporated, this time as a city. At this time, the city council expanded to six members. In 1911, Ocean City switched to a city commission government, in which voters picked three commissioners, with one designated as mayor. On July 1, 1978, Ocean City switched to a mayor–council form of government, in which there are seven council members, and a directly-elected mayor.

== Mayors ==
No.	Mayor	Term start	Term end	Notes	References
1	Gainer P. Moore	1884	1890	First mayor of borough of Ocean City	
2	James E. Pryor	1890	1892		
3	Gainer P. Moore	1892	1894	Second tenure as mayor	
4	Harry G. Steelman	1894	1895	Tied with Robert Fisher in the 1894 mayoral election. The city council chose Steelman, which Fisher contested in court.	
5	Robert Fisher	1895	1896	Tied with Harry G. Steelman in the 1894 mayoral election. After contesting in court, the city council instated Fisher for the second year of the two-year term.	
6	Gainer P. Moore	1896	1897	Third and final tenure as mayor	
7	Wesley C. Smith	1897	1901	First mayor after Ocean City incorporated as a city	
8	Joseph G. Champion	1901	1907	First of three tenures as mayor.	
9	Lewis M. Cresse	1907	1911		
10	Harry Headley	1911	1915	City government changed to a three-person commission, which chose Headley.	
11	Joseph G. Champion	1915	1931	Second of three tenures as mayor.	
12	Harry Headley	1931	1935	Second tenure as mayor.	
13	Joseph G. Champion	1935	1939	Third and final tenure as mayor.	
14	George D. Richards	1939	May 17, 1943	Died on the last day of his term.	
15	Clyde William Struble, Sr.	May 1943	December 3, 1948	Delegate to 1947 state constitution convention. He died in office on December 3, 1948.	
Vacant		December 3, 1948	May 10, 1949	City commission was unable to agree on replacement. Position was vacant until the next mayoral election on May 10, 1949.	
16	Edward B. Bowker	1949	1959		
17	Nathaniel C. Smith	1959	1963		
18	B. Thomas Waldman	1963	1967		
19	Robert L. Sharp	1967	1971		
20	B. Thomas Waldman	1971	1978		
21	Chester A. Wimberg	1978	1982	First person elected under the newly adopted mayor–council form of city government	
22	Jack Bittner	1982	1986		
23	Roy Gillian	1986	1990		
24	Nickolas J. "Chick" Trofa	1990	January 31, 1992	He died of a heart attack while in office on January 31, 1992.	
25	Richard Deaney	January 31, 1992	May 12, 1992	Appointed by City Council until a special election on May 12	
26	Henry "Bud" Knight	May 12, 1992	2006	He won a special election in 1992, then served three more terms.	
27	Sal Perillo	July 2006	July 2010		
28	Jay Gillian	July 2010		Current mayor of Ocean City	

== Higher offices held ==
The following is a list of higher public offices held by mayors, before or after their mayoral term(s).

Mayor	Mayoral term(s)	Other offices held	References
Wesley C. Smith	1897–1901	New Jersey General Assembly (1895)	
Lewis M. Cresse	1907–1911	New Jersey General Assembly (1901-1903)	
Lewis M. Cresse	1907–1911	New Jersey Senate (1904-1906)	
Joseph G. Champion	1915-1931	Cape May County Board of Freeholders (1922)	
Nathaniel Smith	1959-1963	New Jersey Senate (1954-1955)	
Jack Bittner	1982-1986	Cape May County Board of Freeholders	
Roy Gillian	1986-1990	Cape May County Board of Freeholders (1971)	
