= Ocean City Municipal Airport (New Jersey) =

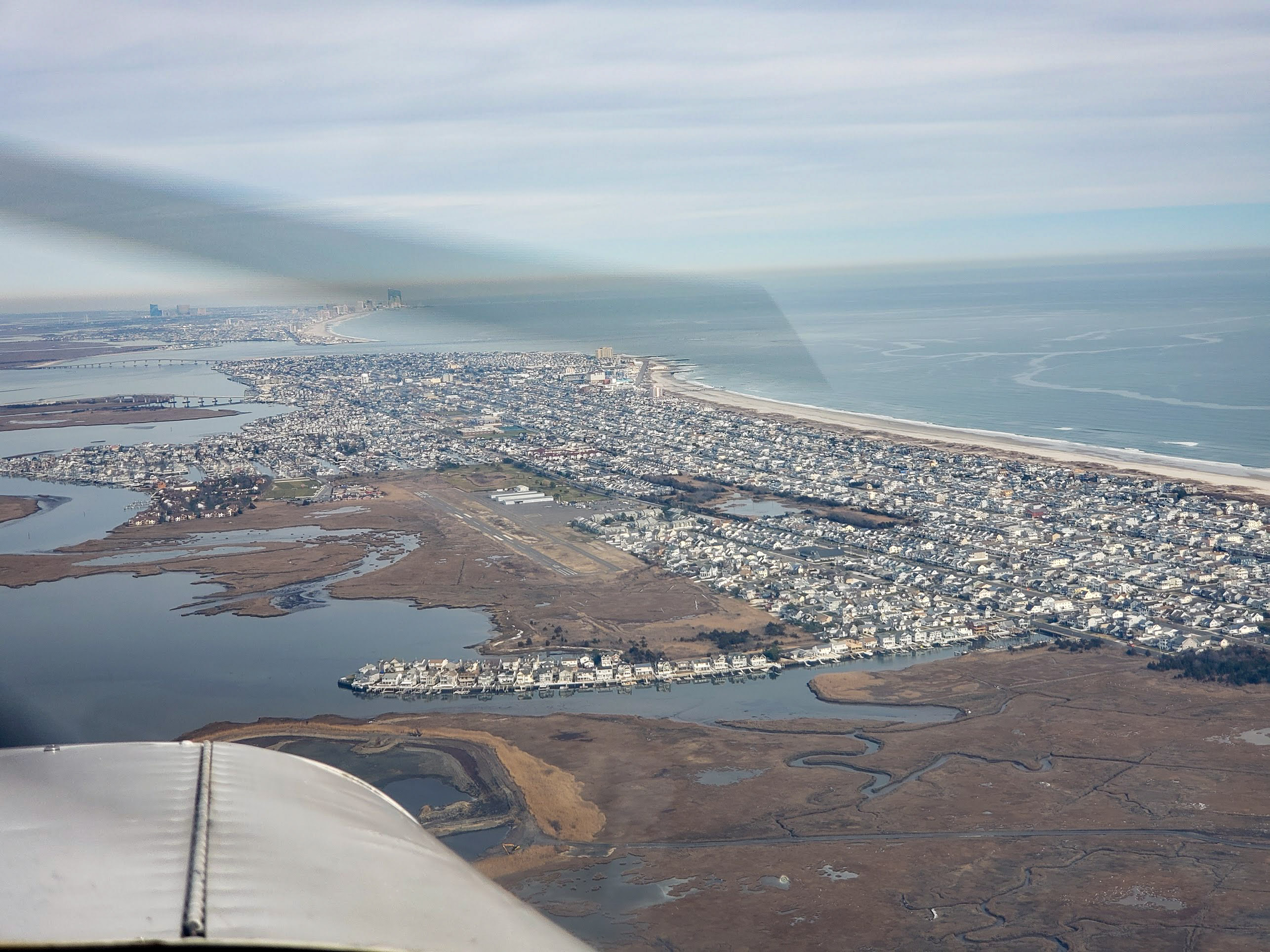
- IATA: none; ICAO: none; FAA LID: 26N

Summary
- Airport type: Public
- Owner: City of Ocean City
- Location: Ocean City, New Jersey
- Elevation AMSL: 5 ft / 2 m
- Coordinates: 39°15′48″N 074°36′27″W
- Website: www.ocnj.us/MunicipalAirport

Map
- Interactive map of Ocean City Municipal Airport

Runways
Direction	Length		Surface
Direction	ft	m	Surface
6/24	2,973	906	Asphalt

Statistics (2008)
- Aircraft operations: 20,164
- Based aircraft: 18
- Source: Federal Aviation Administration

Ocean City Municipal Airport (FAA LID: 26N) is the only airport located on a New Jersey barrier island. Named Clarke Field after a naval commander, the public airport is located two nautical miles (3.704 km) southwest of the central business district of Ocean City, in Cape May County, New Jersey, United States. It is owned by the City of Ocean City. It was built between 1934 and 1935 with funds from the Civil Works Administration.

== History ==
In October 1929, Ocean City officials purchased 124 acres (50 ha) of land between 22nd and 28th street, west of Bay Avenue, for $87,000 (1929 USD). The city planned on building a municipal airport, replacing the grassy field at 18th and Bay. A week after the city purchased the land, the Wall Street crash of 1929 occurred, which halted plans due to lack of money. On September 7, 1932, then-mayor Harry Headley named the undeveloped airport as Clarke Field, after Vincent A. Clarke Jr., commander of the USS Los Angeles airship. On January 5, 1934, Mayor Headley announced that the city received a $100,400 grant (1934 USD) from the Civil Works Administration to construct the new airport – about 75% would go toward labor, employing about 400 people, while the remainder of the cost was for materials.

On January 15, 1934, the future airport had its groundbreaking ceremony. The airport was designed by Erwin L. Schwatt, and was originally intended to have three runways, with material dredged from the bay. On July 4, 1935, the airport opened, after delays due to weather and broken equipment. The airport opened to the public in November 1937, making it the only airport on a New Jersey barrier island.

In February 2018, the city of Ocean City proposed spending $2.3 million to rebuild the airport, replacing the small building that currently houses the airport operation center and a small diner.

== Facilities and aircraft ==
Ocean City Municipal Airport covers an area of 60 acres (24 ha). It contains one asphalt paved runway (6/24) measuring 2,972 ft (906 m) in length, and 60 ft (18 m) wide.

For the 12-month period ending June 30, 2018, the airport had 22,218 aircraft operations, which averages to 61 per day, with 40% local general aviation and 60% itinerant general aviation. There are 14 aircraft based at this airport: 12 single-engine and 2 multi-engine.

On the airport premises is the Ocean City Municipal Golf Course. The Airport Diner, formerly housed in the airport building, closed during the COVID-19 pandemic.

== Incidents ==
Several incidents have occurred at the airport, warranting investigations by the National Transportation Safety Board (NTSB).

- On March 24, 2002, a Cessna 172P veered off the runway upon landing due to high crosswinds.
- On July 4, 2002, a Mooney M20J crashed and sustained heavy damage upon landing on the runway and veering into nearby marsh.
- On May 19, 2003, a Cessna 175a left the airport and lost engine power. After turning the plane around, the pilot landed the plane in the ocean about 2 mi (3.2 km) south of the airport. A day later on May 20, a Cessna 172G encountered severe turbulence upon landing at the airport. The pilot attempted to abort the landing, but due to insufficient speed, the plane traveled off the runway and crashed into a nearby swamp, which severely damaged the plane and injured the two occupants.
- On August 29, 2004, a Piper PA-24-180 collided with a wind marker due to pilot error, causing severe damage to the plane, but no injuries to the four occupants.
- On July 4, 2009, a Lancair monoplane flew from Lancaster, Pennsylvania to Ocean City Airport, and struck two Canada geese while landing. The plane veered off the runway and struck a light. The accident damaged the plane's propeller, the right-main landing gear, and the frame. The NTSB credited the incident to the lack of a wildlife management program at the airport; as a result, the airport began warning pilots of wildlife. Subsequently, workers captured and removed over 40 geese from the airport.
- On May 3, 2011, a 1980 Cessna A185F was blown off the runway during takeoff, causing the plane to crash, but no injuries to the pilot.
- On August 10, 2017, a CASA 1.131 plane veered off the runway during landing, which damaged the left wing and the landing gear.
- On August 10, 2018, a Robinson R22 helicopter crashed near the runway, involving a student and a flight instructor; the two occupants were taken to nearby Shore Memorial Hospital for non-life-threatening injuries.

== See also ==
- List of airports in New Jersey
