= 10th Avenue station =

10th Avenue station or Tenth Avenue station may refer to:

- 10th Avenue station (PNR), a railway station in Caloocan, Metro Manila, Philippines
- 10th Avenue station (IRT Flushing Line), a proposed subway station in Manhattan, New York, United States
- Galleria/Southwest 10th Avenue station, a light rail stop in Portland, Oregon, United States

== See also ==
- 10th Street station (disambiguation)
