= Ocean City, New Jersey =

City in Cape May County, New Jersey, US

- City
- City of Ocean City
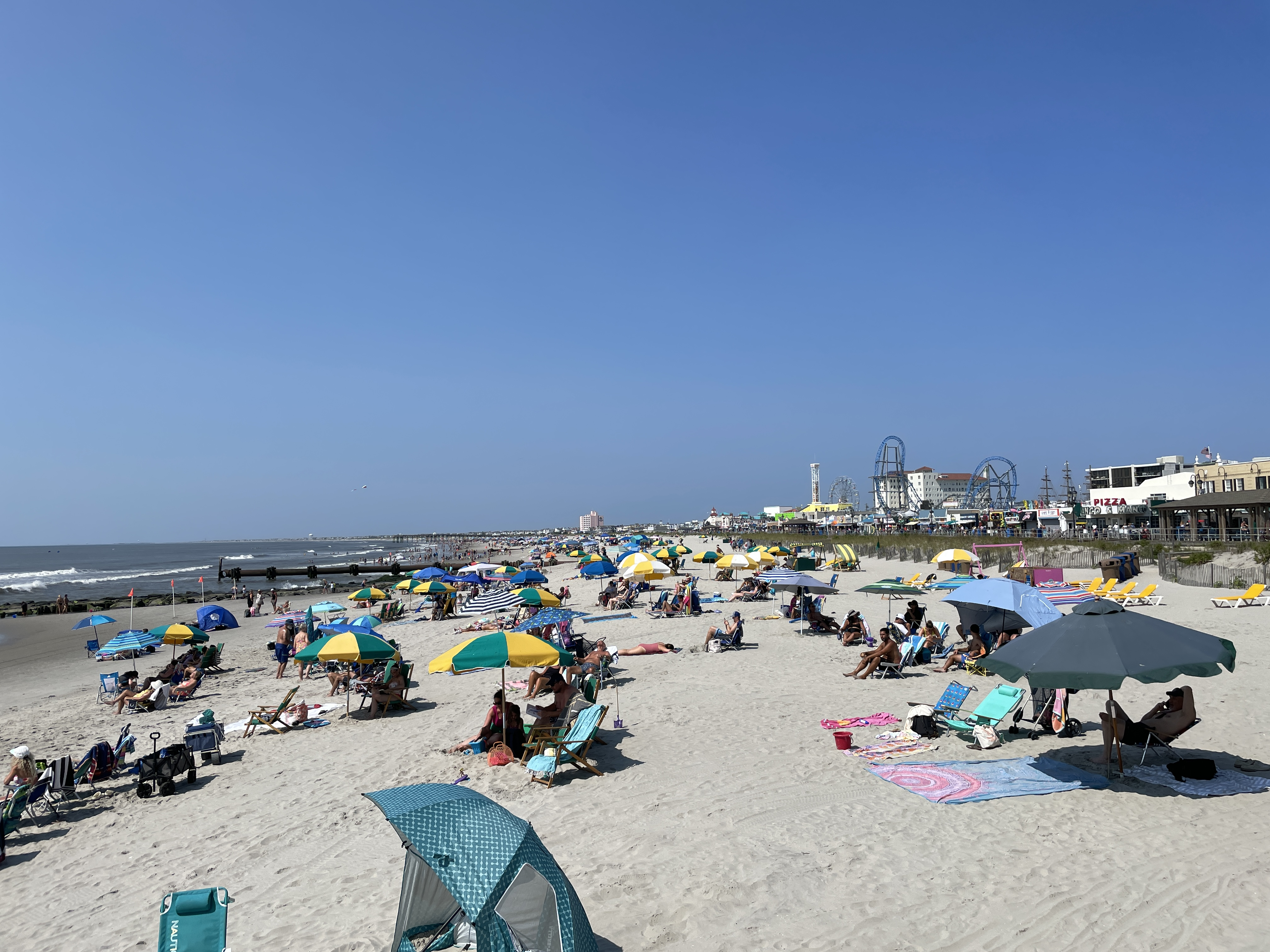
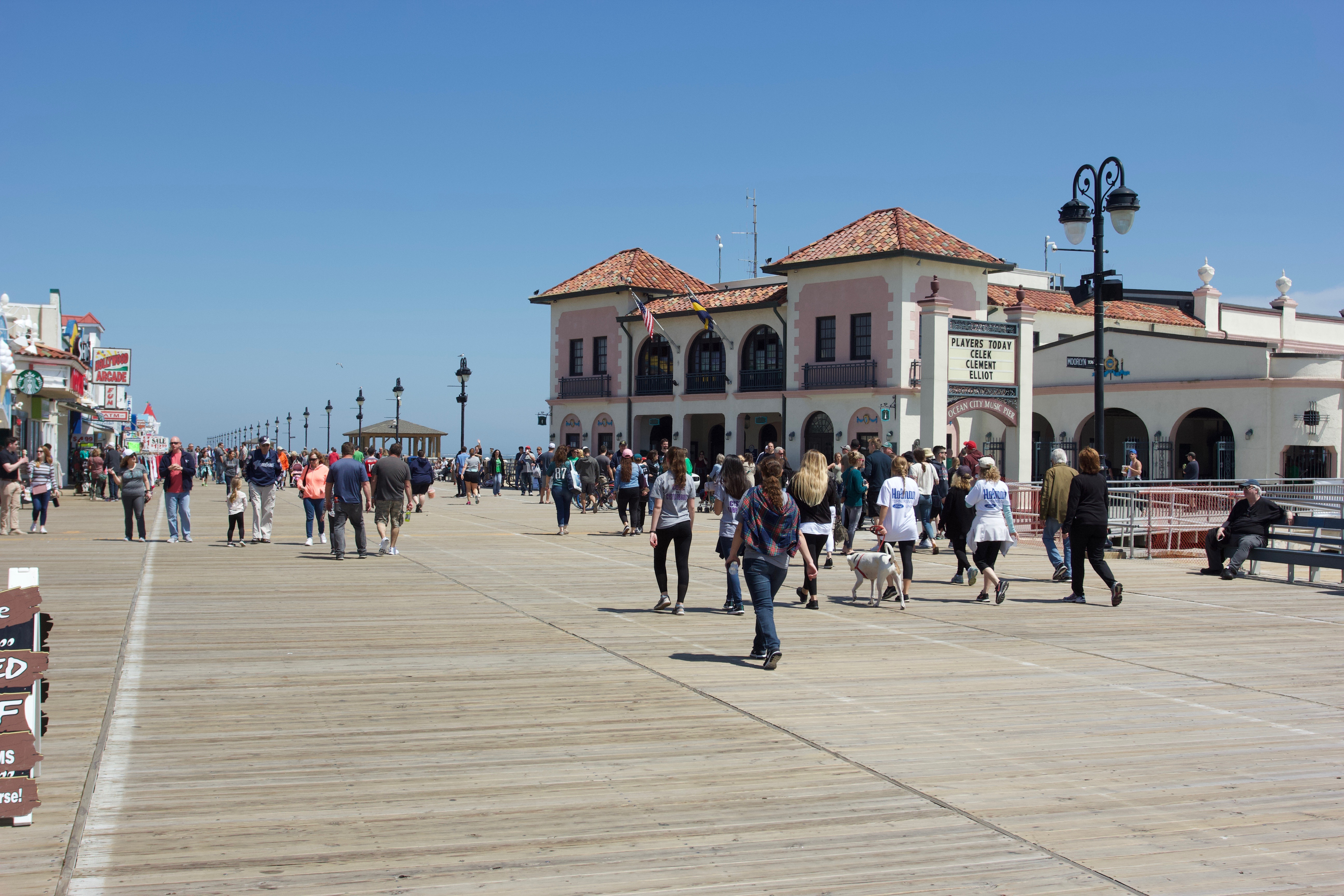
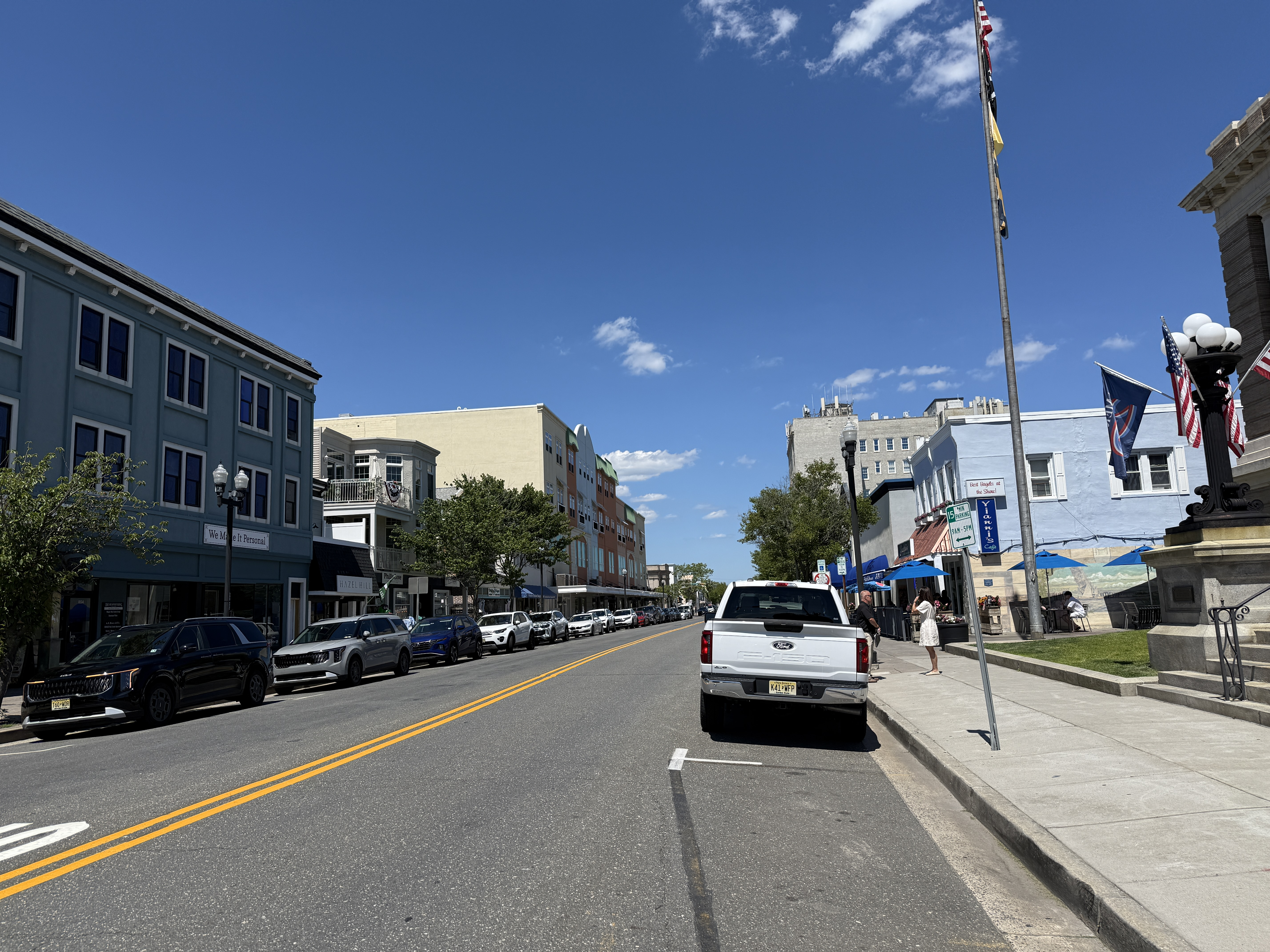
- Ocean City beach from Music Pier, August 2023 Ocean City Boardwalk with Music Pier in the background Asbury Avenue in downtown Ocean City

- Flag Seal
- Motto: "America's Greatest Family Resort"
- Location of Ocean City in Cape May County highlighted in red (left). Inset map: Location of Cape May County in New Jersey highlighted in orange (right).

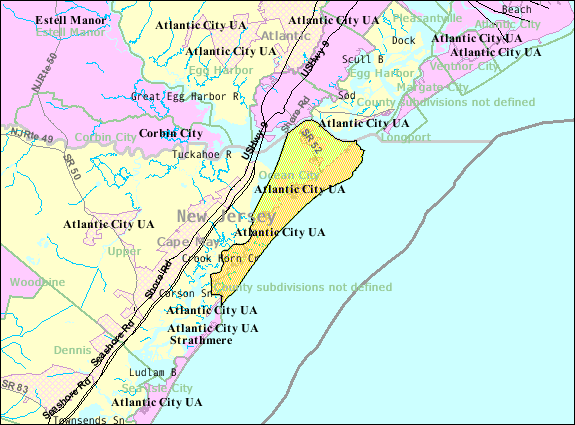
- Census Bureau map of Ocean City, New Jersey

- Location in Cape May County Location in New Jersey Location in the United States
- Coordinates: 39.269523°N 74.599797°W
- Country: United States
- State: New Jersey
- County: Cape May
- Incorporated: May 3, 1884 (as borough)
- Reincorporated: March 25, 1897 (as city)

Government
  - Type: Faulkner Act (mayor–council)
  - Body: City Council
  - Mayor: Jay A. Gillian (term ends June 30, 2026)
  - Administrator: George Savastano
  - Municipal clerk: Melissa Rasner

Area
  - Total: 11.56 sq mi (29.93 km^{2})
  - Land: 6.75 sq mi (17.49 km^{2})
  - Water: 4.80 sq mi (12.44 km^{2}) 41.87%
  - Rank: 196th of 565 in state 5th of 16 in county
- Elevation: 7 ft (2.1 m)

Population (2020)
  - Total: 11,229
  - Estimate (2023): 11,242
  - Rank: 222nd of 565 in state 4th of 16 in county
  - Density: 1,662.8/sq mi (642.0/km^{2})
  - Rank: 324th of 565 in state 5th of 16 in county
- Time zone: UTC−05:00 (Eastern (EST))
  - Summer (DST): UTC−04:00 (Eastern (EDT))
- ZIP Code: 08226
- Area code: 609 Exchanges: 391, 398, 399, 525, 814
- FIPS code: 3400954360
- GNIS feature ID: 0885332
- Website: www.ocnj.us

Ocean City is a city in Cape May County, in the U.S. state of New Jersey. It is the principal city of the Ocean City metropolitan statistical area, which encompasses all of Cape May County, and is part of the Philadelphia metropolitan area. It is part of the South Jersey region of the state.

As of the 2020 United States census, the city's population was 11,229, a decrease of 472 (−4.0%) from the 2010 census count of 11,701, which in turn reflected a decline of 3,677 (−23.9%) from the 15,378 counted in the 2000 census. In summer months, with an influx of tourists and second homeowners, there are estimated to be 115,000 to 130,000 within the city's borders.

Ocean City originated as a borough by an act of the New Jersey Legislature on May 3, 1884, from portions of Upper Township, based on results from a referendum on April 30, 1884, and was reincorporated as a borough on March 31, 1890. Ocean City was incorporated as a city, its current government form, on March 25, 1897. The city is named for its location on the Atlantic Ocean.

Known as a family-oriented seaside resort, Ocean City has not allowed the sale of alcoholic beverages within its limits since its founding in 1879, offering miles of guarded beaches, a boardwalk that stretches for 2.5 miles (4.0 km), and a downtown shopping and dining district. The city earned $5.9 million in revenue from beach tags in 2025, the highest of any municipality in the state.

Travel Channel rated Ocean City as the Best Family Beach of 2005. It was ranked the third-best beach in New Jersey in the 2008 Top 10 Beaches Contest sponsored by the New Jersey Marine Sciences Consortium. In the 2009 Top 10 Beaches Contest sponsored by NJ.com, Ocean City ranked first.

== History ==
Before Ocean City was established, local Native Americans set up camps on the island for fishing in the summer months. In 1633, Dutch navigator David Pietersz. de Vries referred to "flat sand beaches with low hills between Cape May and Egg Harbor", possibly the earliest reference to the island that became Ocean City. In 1695, Thomas Budd surveyed the land on behalf of the West Jersey Society.

Originally purchased by the Somers family, the island was named Peck's Beach, believed to have been given the name for a whaler named John Peck. Around 1700, Peck began using the barrier island as a base of operation and storage place for freshly caught whales. The island was also used as a cattle-grazing area, and mainlanders would boat over for a picnic or to hunt.

The first record of a house on Peck's Beach was in 1752. During the 18th century, cattle grazers brought cows to the island, where plentiful trees, weeds, brush, and seagrass provided suitable conditions. Parker Miller was the first permanent resident of Peck's Beach in 1859.

On September 10, 1879, four Methodist ministers—Ezra B. Lake, James Lake, S. Wesley Lake, and William Burrell—chose the island as a suitable spot to establish a Christian retreat and camp meeting on the order of Ocean Grove. They met under a tall cedar tree, which stands today in the lobby of the Ocean City Tabernacle. Having chosen the name Ocean City, the founders incorporated the Ocean City Association and laid out streets and lots for cottages, hotels, and businesses. The Ocean City Tabernacle was built between Wesley and Asbury Avenues and between 5th and 6th Streets. Camp meetings were held by the following summer and continue uninterrupted to this day.

In 1881, the first school on the island opened. The first bridge to the island was built in 1883, and the West Jersey Railroad opened in 1884. Based on a referendum on April 30, 1884, the borough of Ocean City was formed from portions of Upper Township, following an act of the New Jersey Legislature on May 3, 1884.

The ship Sindia joined other shipwrecks on the beach on December 15, 1901, on its way to New York City from Kobe, Japan, but has since sunk below the sand. A salvage attempt to retrieve treasures believed to have been on the ship was most recently launched in the 1970s, all of which have been unsuccessful. In 1920, the Chamber of Commerce adopted the slogan "America's Greatest Family Resort".

In 1927, a large fire broke out and caused $1.5 million in damage (equivalent to $28 million in 2025). This led the city to move the boardwalk closer to the ocean, which resulted in a greater potential for damage from saltwater.

=== Alcohol prohibition ===
As a result of its religious origins, the sale or public drinking of alcoholic beverages in Ocean City was prohibited. In 1881, the Ocean City Association passed a set of blue laws, which were designed to enforce religious standards. The town banned the manufacturing or sale of alcohol in 1909.

Promoting water instead of drinking alcohol, the Woman's Christian Temperance Union donated a public fountain, dedicated on Memorial Day in 1915. Despite the prohibition of alcohol within the municipality, illegal saloons operated within Ocean City, and in 1929, prosecutors raided 27 speakeasies.

In 1951, the town banned the consumption of alcohol on the beach. All public alcohol consumption was banned in 1958. During the campaign for a 1986 referendum to repeal the blue laws, ads in the local paper suggested that the repeal could be next. In May 2012, 68.8% of voters rejected a ballot initiative for BYOB—bring your own bottle. As of 2016, Ocean City was one of 32 dry towns in New Jersey. Despite the prohibition in the city, 18.3% of adults in the Ocean City metropolitan statistical area (which includes all of Cape May County) drink alcohol heavily or binge drink, the highest percentage of any metro area in the state. USA Today listed Ocean City as the state's most drunken city on its 2017 list of "The drunkest city in every state". Additionally, a loophole in the law allows private dining clubs adjacent to restaurants to serve alcohol to members.

== Geography ==
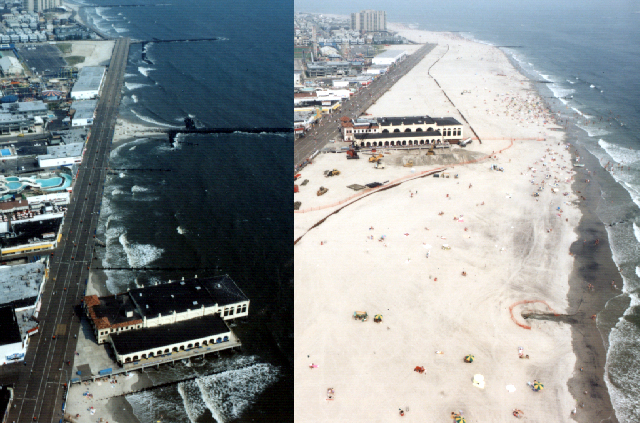
Aerial view of Ocean City's beach before (left) and after (right) a beach nourishment project

According to the U.S. Census Bureau, the city had a total area of 11.56 square miles (29.93 km^{2}), including 6.72 square miles (17.39 km^{2}) of land and 4.84 square miles (12.53 km^{2}) of water (41.87%). The island is about 8-mile (13 km) long. Unincorporated communities, localities, and place names located partially or completely within the city include Peck Beach.

Ocean City is situated on a barrier island bordered by the Strathmere section of Upper Township to the south, the Marmora section of Upper Township to the west, and Somers Point and Egg Harbor Township across the Great Egg Harbor Bay to the north. The eastern side of Ocean City borders the Atlantic Ocean.

Since 1951, the beach has been replenished more than 30 times, potentially the most of any beach in the country, in response to erosion caused by storms. A $5 million replenishment project undertaken in 1982 that added 1,200,000 cubic yards (920,000 m^{3}) of material had largely disappeared within two and a half months after a series of nor'easters.

During the 1960s and 1970s, the city owned its own dredge, but ceased replenishment projects when it could not secure permits for dredging the lagoons. Since 1992, the U.S. Army Corps of Reserve has handled responsibility for beach nourishment projects, periodically adding 1,100,000 cubic yards (840,000 m^{3}), roughly every three years, using the shoal area about 5,000 feet (1,500 m) offshore the Great Egg Harbor Inlet. The project and funding was authorized in the Water Resources Development Act of 1986, and the most recent replenishment was completed in December 2017. After Hurricane Sandy in 2012, the Army Corps completed the city's largest beach replenishment since 1993, adding 1,800,000 cubic yards (1,400,000 m^{3}) of sand to replenish the eroded beaches.

=== Parks ===
The city utilizes 39% of its land area—1,716 acres (694 ha)—for parks and recreation purposes. This includes about 1,300 acres (530 ha) of protected dunes and wetlands. There are several parks within the confines of Ocean City, including ten playgrounds scattered across the island. There are also a volleyball court, a shuffleboard court, a hockey rink, four baseball fields, four soccer fields, eight basketball courts, and 24 tennis courts.

Across from the Ocean City Airport is the Howard Stainton Wildlife Refuge, a 16 acres (6.5 ha) area of wetlands established in 1997. There are no trails, but there is a viewing platform accessible from Bay Avenue. Adjacent to the airport is the Ocean City Municipal Golf Course, a 12–hole course run by the city and open to the public.

At the southern end of the island is Corson's Inlet State Park, which was established in 1969 to preserve one of the last undeveloped tracts of land along the oceanfront. The park is accessible by Ocean Drive (Cape May County Route 619), which bisects the park.

== Demographics ==
Historical population
Census	Pop.	Note	%±
1890	452		—
1900	1,307		189.2%
1910	1,950		49.2%
1920	2,512		28.8%
1930	5,525		119.9%
1940	4,672		−15.4%
1950	6,040		29.3%
1960	7,618		26.1%
1970	10,575		38.8%
1980	13,949		31.9%
1990	15,512		11.2%
2000	15,378		−0.9%
2010	11,701		−23.9%
2020	11,229		−4.0%
2023 (est.)	11,242		0.1%
Population sources: 1890–2000 1890–1920; 1890 1890–1910 1910–1930; 1940–2000 2000; 2010 2020

=== 2020 census ===
As of the 2020 census, Ocean City had a population of 11,229. The median age was 57.3 years. 13.9% of residents were under the age of 18 and 35.1% of residents were 65 years of age or older. For every 100 females there were 88.3 males, and for every 100 females age 18 and over there were 86.4 males age 18 and over.

99.8% of residents lived in urban areas, while 0.2% lived in rural areas.

There were 5,454 households in Ocean City, of which 17.4% had children under the age of 18 living in them. Of all households, 46.0% were married-couple households, 18.9% were households with a male householder and no spouse or partner present, and 31.6% were households with a female householder and no spouse or partner present. About 38.3% of all households were made up of individuals and 22.9% had someone living alone who was 65 years of age or older.

There were 20,752 housing units, of which 73.7% were vacant. The homeowner vacancy rate was 2.8% and the rental vacancy rate was 40.5%.

Racial composition as of the 2020 census
Race	Number	Percent
White	10,175	90.6%
Black or African American	220	2.0%
American Indian and Alaska Native	20	0.2%
Asian	106	0.9%
Native Hawaiian and Other Pacific Islander	1	0.0%
Some other race	250	2.2%
Two or more races	457	4.1%
Hispanic or Latino (of any race)	548	4.9%

=== 2010 census ===
The 2010 United States census counted 11,701 people, 5,890 households, and 3,086 families in the city. The population density was 1,847.7 per square mile (713.4/km^{2}). There were 20,871 housing units at an average density of 3,295.7 per square mile (1,272.5/km^{2}). The racial makeup was 92.05% (10,771) White, 3.50% (410) Black or African American, 0.13% (15) Native American, 0.71% (83) Asian, 0.03% (3) Pacific Islander, 1.91% (224) from other races, and 1.67% (195) from two or more races. Hispanic or Latino of any race were 5.50% (643) of the population.

Of the 5,890 households, 14.8% had children under the age of 18; 40.6% were married couples living together; 8.8% had a female householder with no husband present and 47.6% were non-families. Of all households, 42.1% were made up of individuals and 21.3% had someone living alone who was 65 years of age or older. The average household size was 1.98 and the average family size was 2.68.

14.4% of the population were under the age of 18, 6.4% from 18 to 24, 16.7% from 25 to 44, 32.9% from 45 to 64, and 29.7% who were 65 years of age or older. The median age was 53.6 years. For every 100 females, the population had 88.7 males. For every 100 females ages 18 and older there were 86.4 males.

The Census Bureau's 2006–2010 American Community Survey showed that (in 2010 inflation-adjusted dollars) median household income was $55,202 (with a margin of error of +/− $6,710) and the median family income was $79,196 (+/− $11,239). Males had a median income of $48,475 (+/− $5,919) versus $41,154 (+/− $12,032) for females. The per capita income for the city was $40,864 (+/− $3,899). About 5.1% of families and 6.4% of the population were below the poverty line, including 4.3% of those under age 18 and 5.8% of those age 65 or over.

=== 2000 census ===
As of the 2000 United States census, there were 15,378 people, 7,464 households, and 4,008 families residing in the city. The population density was 2,222.8 inhabitants per square mile (858.2/km^{2}). There were 20,298 housing units at an average density of 2,934.0 per square mile (1,132.8/km^{2}). The racial makeup of the city was 93.57% White, 4.31% African American, 0.12% Native American, 0.56% Asian, 0.07% Pacific Islander, 0.52% from other races, and 0.86% from two or more races. Hispanic or Latino of any race were 1.99% of the population.

There were 7,464 households, out of which 16.9% had children under the age of 18 living with them, 41.9% were married couples living together, 9.2% had a female householder with no husband present, and 46.3% were non-families. 40.4% of all households were made up of individuals, and 17.7% had someone living alone who was 65 years of age or older. The average household size was 2.02 and the average family size was 2.71.

In the city, the population was spread out, with 16.4% under age 18, 5.6% from 18 to 24, 23.8% from 25 to 44, 28.3% from 45 to 64, and 25.9% who were 65 years of age or older. The median age was 48 years. For every 100 females, there were 86.4 males. For every 100 women age 18 and over, there were 82.8 men.

The median income for a household in the city was $44,158, and the median income for a family was $61,731. Males had a median income of $42,224 versus $31,282 for females. The per capita income for the city was $33,217. About 4.3% of families and 6.8% of the population were below the poverty line, including 10.0% of those under age 18 and 6.5% of those age 65 or over.

== Economy ==
=== Beach ===
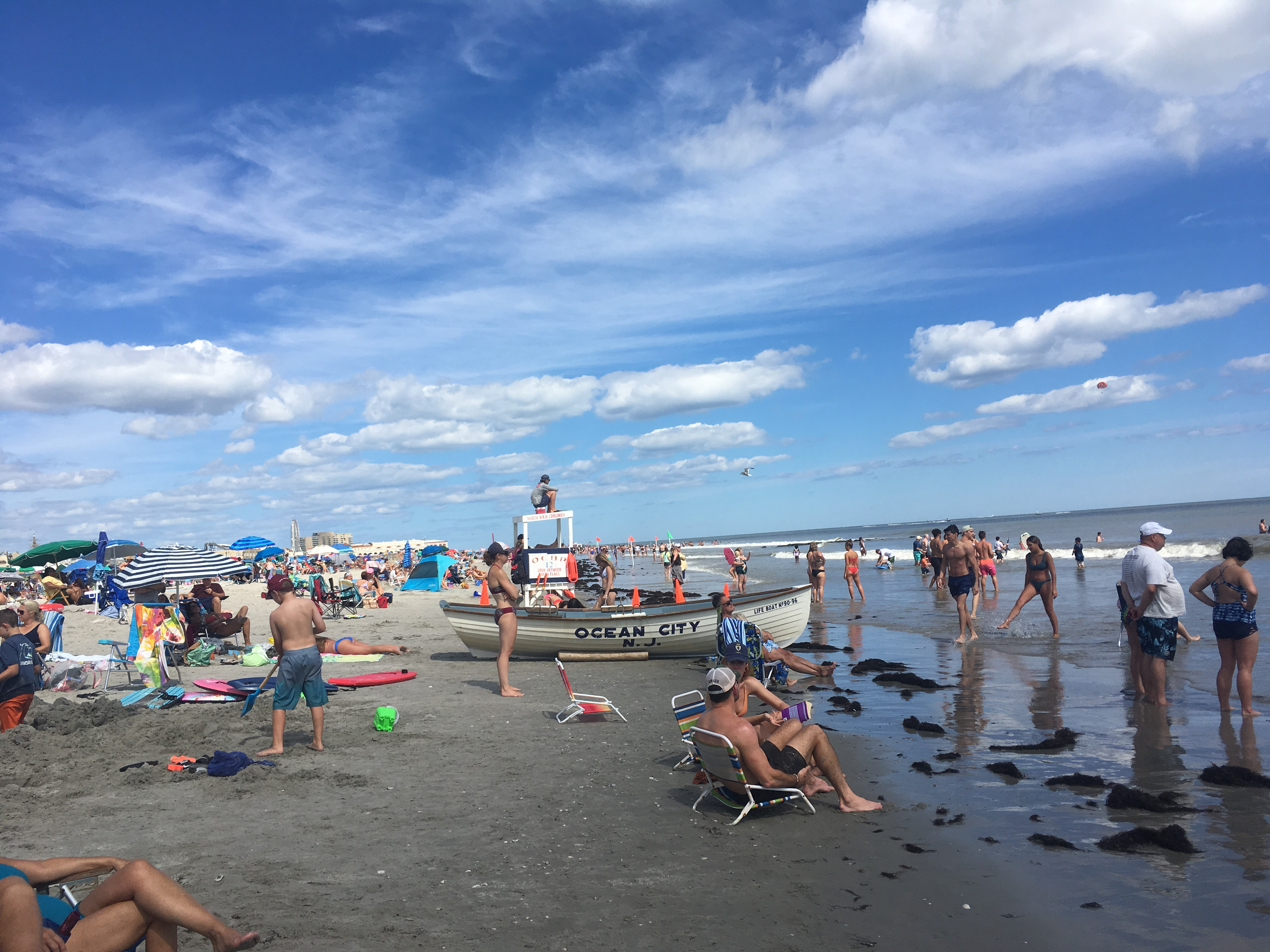
Ocean City beach at 12th Street, August 2020

The concept of beach tags at the Jersey Shore was introduced in the late 1920s, but Ocean City did not establish them until 1976. Beach tags are a major source of revenue for the city, with the $5.9 million in revenue generated in the 2025 season (down from $6.2 million the previous year), the most of any municipality in the state. In the 2017 budget, the projected $4.1 million in fees for beach tags and $3 million for parking were two of the city's biggest revenue sources, accounting for almost 9% of the city's annual budget of almost $80 million, and increased fees, including a doubling of the fee for daily tags, were part of an effort to bring the total up to $5 million for the 2023 season.

From early June through Labor Day, Ocean City requires individuals age 12 and up to purchase a beach tag to access its beaches. For the 2023 season (from the first weekend in June through Labor Day), a one-day pass cost $10, a weekly pass was $20, and a seasonal pass for the full summer season was $25. Additionally, there are free seasonal beach tags made available to military personnel. Beach tag revenue is used by the city to cover the costs of maintaining and cleaning the beaches. It is also used to hire and pay lifeguards and other members of the beach patrol for the city.

=== Boardwalk ===
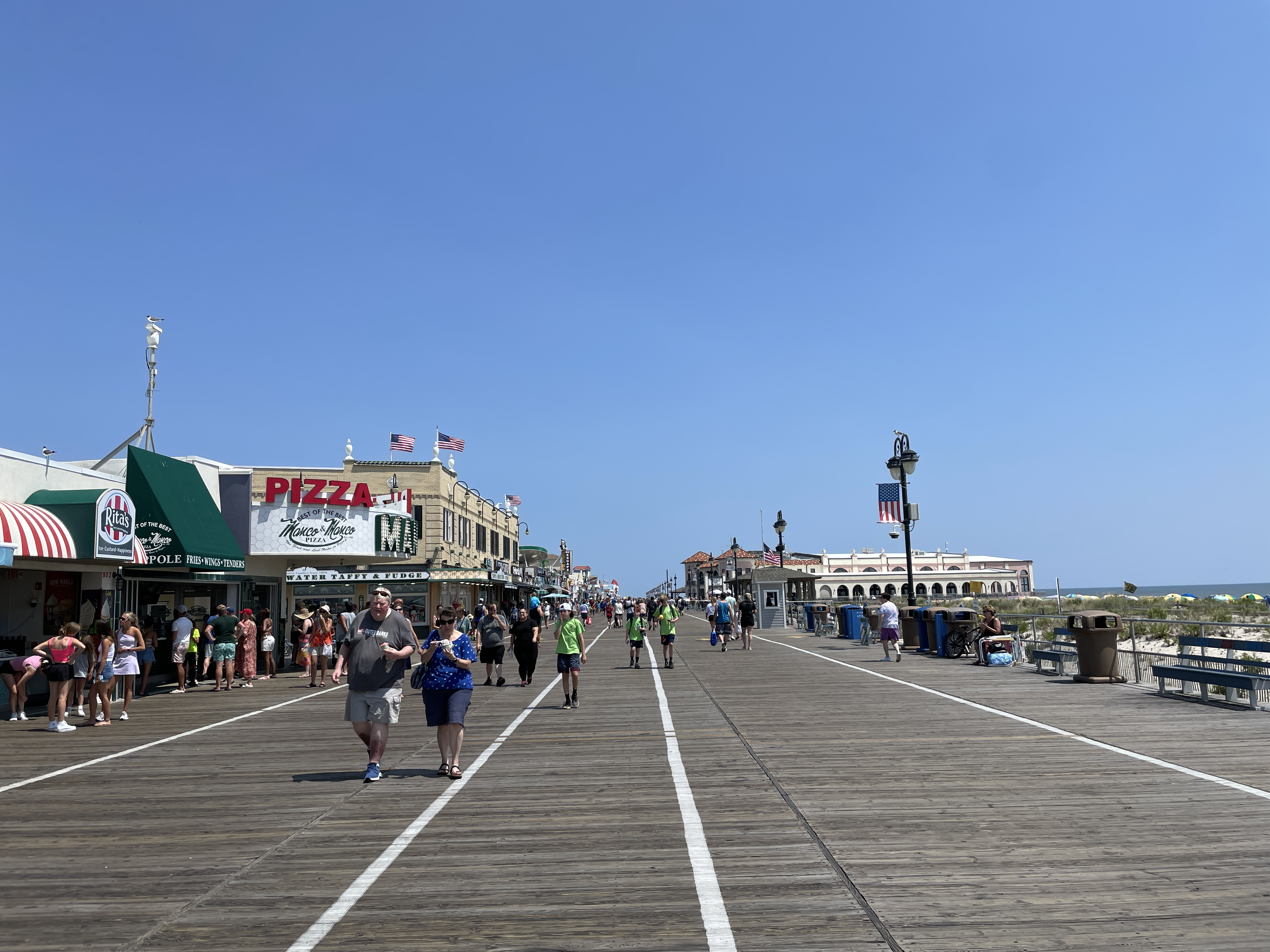
Ocean City boardwalk looking north at 9th Street

Adjacent to the beach is a 2.45-mile (3.94 km) long boardwalk that which runs north from 23rd Street to St. James Place. The boardwalk was first built in 1880 from the Second Street wharf to Fourth Street and West Avenue. In 1885, plans to extend the boardwalk along the entire beach were made as the city's first amusement house, a pavilion on the beach at 11th street called "The Excursion" opened. A second amusement park, the "I.G. Adams pavilion", at Ninth Street and the boardwalk, opened soon after but was destroyed by fire in 1893. Following a second catastrophic fire in 1927, the boardwalk and its businesses were rebuilt 300 feet (91 m) closer to the ocean on concrete pilings, with parking created for cars in the space where the buildings and boardwalk once stood. The Ocean City Music Pier partially opened one year later, with work completed in time for the 1929 season.

In 2007, controversy emerged over the city's proposed use of ipê, a type of wood, to re-deck parts of the boardwalk. Environmental activists protested against the city's use of the wood, but the plan went ahead. In fall 2013, the city began a $10 million project to rebuild the 85 year old boardwalk from 5th to 12th Streets. This replaced the concrete substructure from 1928 with wooden supports and pine decking, and included the removal of 12,000 cubic yards (9,200 m^{3}) of sand. Originally intended to be a seven-year project, the work finished two years ahead of schedule in March 2018.

==== Attractions ====
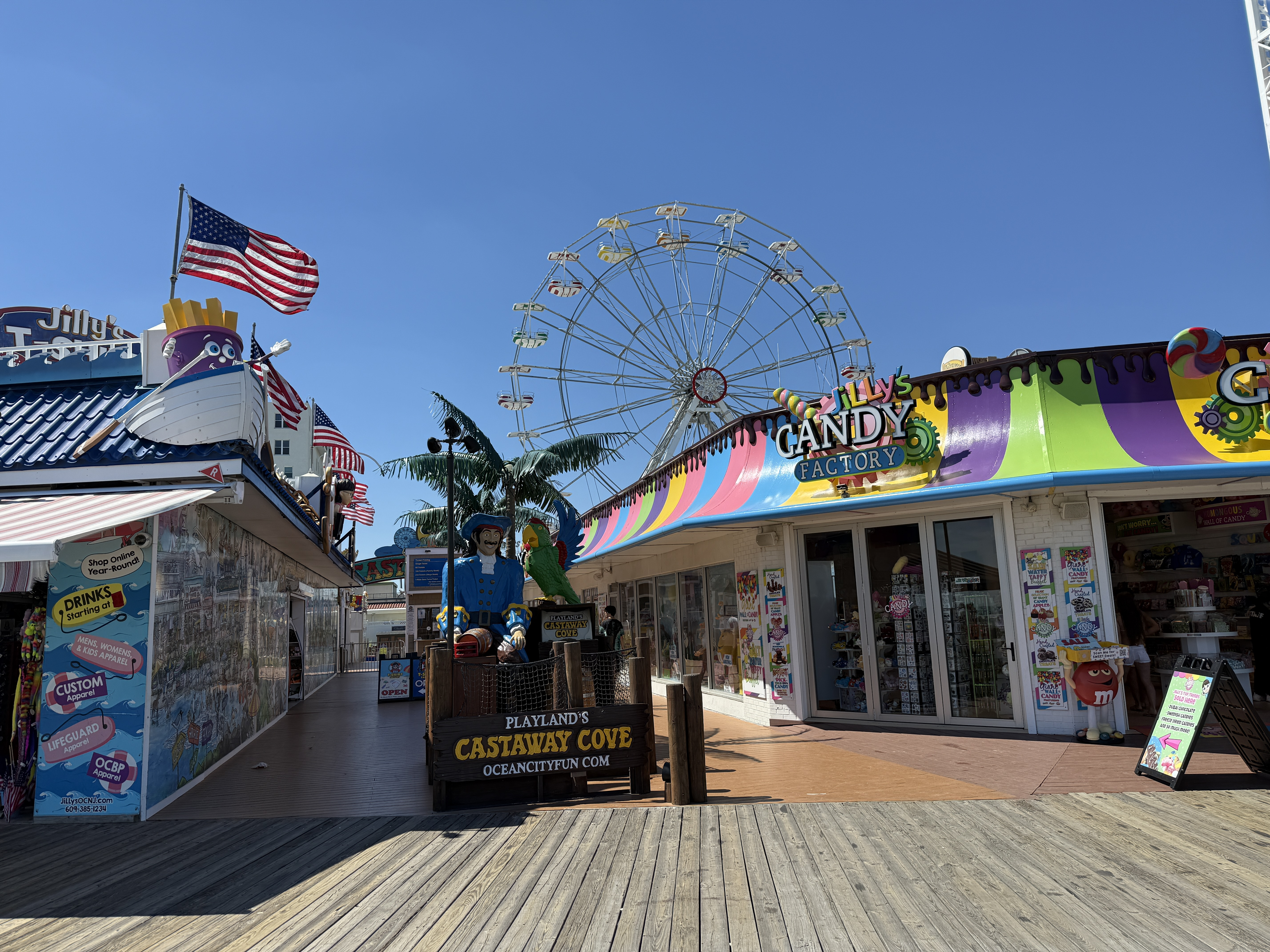
Playland's Castaway Cove

In 1965, the Wonderland Amusement Park opened on the boardwalk at 6th Street, which is now known as Gillian's Wonderland Pier. Runaway Train, a steel twister, operated as the park's sole major roller coaster until its removal in 2018. The theme park permanently closed at the end of the 2024 season.

Playland's Castaway Cove is located on the boardwalk at 10th Street. Two major roller coasters operated there, which were the Python, a looping coaster, and the Flitzer, a wild mouse coaster. A new major shuttle coaster at Castaway Cove, Storm, was planned to be finished in summer 2013. The two older coasters were removed and for the 2016 summer season, a new ride called GaleForce was being built, which is a high thrill roller coaster with three linear synchronous motor launches reaching speeds of 64 miles per hour (103 km/h) and a 125-foot (38 m) beyond vertical drop. GaleForce opened to the public on May 26, 2017. The new Wild Waves ride is a family-oriented coaster, with a height of 50 feet (15 m), that wraps around the GaleForce coaster. The new Whirlwind ride is a figure eight kiddie coaster with spinning cars.

There is also a water park located on the boardwalk called OC Waterpark, open during the summer months.

There are at least 8 mini golf courses on the Boardwalk in Ocean City.

=== Media ===
Media publications in Ocean City include its newspaper, The Ocean City Sentinel Ocean City also has a seasonal publication, The Ocean City Sure Guide, and a lifestyle magazine known as Ocean City Magazine. The city also has a daily blog that has update on the city as a whole, called OCNJDaily

== Sports ==
Ocean City Nor'easters of USL League Two play at Carey Stadium.

== Government ==
=== Local government ===
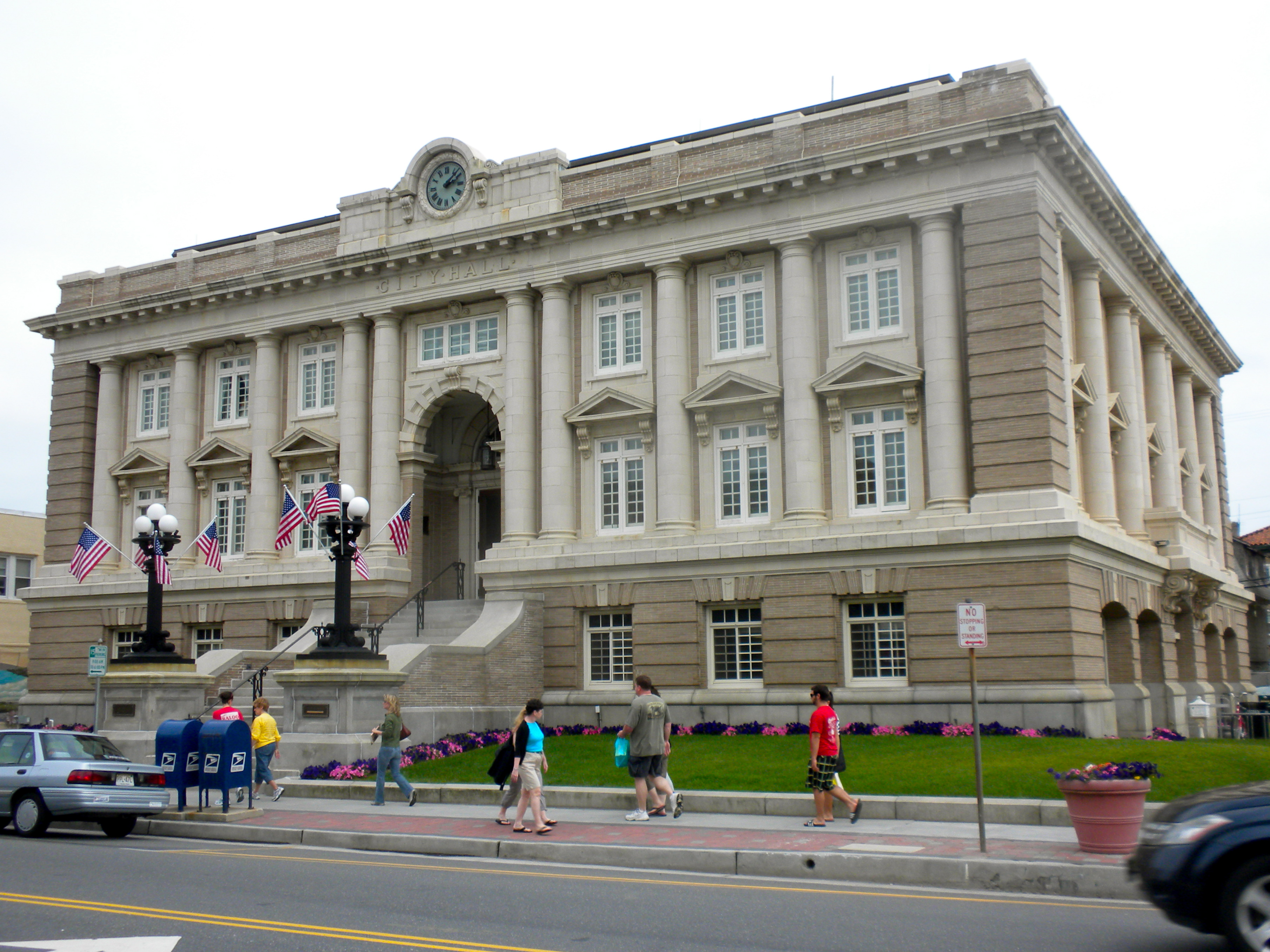
Ocean City City Hall, May 2010

The City of Ocean City was incorporated on March 25, 1897. Since July 1, 1978, the city has operated within the Faulkner Act, formally known as the Optional Municipal Charter Law, under the mayor–council system of municipal government, which is used in 71 municipalities (of the 564) statewide. The governing body is comprised of the Mayor and the City Council. The mayor, the chief executive of the community, is chosen at-large for a four-year term at the municipal election in May and serves part-time for a yearly salary. The mayor neither presides over, nor has a vote on the council. The mayor has veto power over ordinances, but any veto can be overridden by a vote of two-thirds of the Council. The City Council is the legislative body and is comprised of seven members, of which four members represent individual wards and three are elected at-large. Each council person serves a staggered four-year term, with the three at-large seats and the mayoral seat up for election together, followed by the four ward seats which are voted upon two years later.

In September 2015, Councilman Michael Allegretto resigned from his seat expiring in December 2018 to take a position as the city's Director of Community Services. As the council could not reach agreement on a successor in the month following the resignation, the position remained vacant until a successor was chosen in the May 2016 municipal election to serve the balance of the term of office. In May 2016, Karen A. Bergman was elected to serve the balance of the vacant term.

The Second Ward seat expiring in December 2020 became vacant in December 2020, when Antwan McClellan resigned to take office in the New Jersey General Assembly.

In August 2021, Terrence Crowley Jr. was appointed to fill the First Ward expiring in December 2024 that had been held by Michael DeVlieger until he had resigned from office. Crowley served on an interim basis until the November 2021 general election, when he was elected to serve the balance of the term of office.

As of 2023, the mayor of Ocean City is Jay A. Gillian, whose term of office ends June 30, 2026. Members of the city council are Council President Peter V. Madden (2026; At Large), Council Vice President Karen A. Bergman (2026; At Large), Terrence Crowley Jr. (2024; First Ward, elected to serve an unexpired term), Jody Levchuk (2024; Third Ward), John A. "Tony" Polcini (2026; At Large), Tomaso Rotondi (2024; Second Ward) and David Winslow (2024; Fourth Ward, appointed to serve an unexpired term).

In August 2023, the city council appointed David Winslow to fill the Fourth Ward seat expiring in December 2024 that had been held by Bob Barr until he resigned from office to take a city on the Cape May Board of County Commissioners; Winslow will serve on an interim basis until the November 2023, when voters will select a candidate to serve the balance of the term of office.

=== Federal, state, and county representation ===
Ocean City is located in the 2nd Congressional District and is part of New Jersey's 1st state legislative district.

For the 119th United States Congress, New Jersey's 2nd congressional district is represented by Jeff Van Drew (R, Dennis Township). New Jersey is represented in the United States Senate by Democrats Cory Booker (Newark, term ends 2027) and Andy Kim (Moorestown, term ends 2031).

For the 2026–2027 session, the 1st legislative district of the New Jersey Legislature is represented in the State Senate by Mike Testa (R, Vineland) and in the General Assembly by Antwan McClellan (R, Ocean City) and Erik K. Simonsen (R, Lower Township).

Cape May County is governed by a five-person Board of County Commissioners whose members are elected at-large on a partisan basis to three-year terms of office on a staggered basis, with either one or two seats coming up for election each year; At an annual reorganization held each January, the commissioners select one member to serve as director and another to serve as vice-director. As of 2026, Cape May County's Commissioners are Director Leonard C. Desiderio (R, Sea Isle City, term as commissioner ends December 31, 2027; term as director ends 2026), Vice-Director Andrew Bulakowski (R, Lower Township; term as commissioner ends 2028; term as vice-director ends 2026). Robert Barr (R, Ocean City; 2028) and Will Morey (R, Wildwood Crest; 2026), with one seat expiring in December 2026 vacant after Melanie Collette resigned from office in March 2026. The county's constitutional officers are Clerk Rita Marie Rothberg (R, Ocean City; 2030), Sheriff Robert Nolan (R, Lower Township; 2026) and Surrogate E. Marie Hayes (R, Ocean City; 2028).

=== Politics ===
Presidential election results

United States presidential election results for Ocean City
Year	Republican		Democratic		Third party(ies)	
Year	No.	%	No.	%	No.	%
2024	3,959	56.44%	2,967	42.30%	88	1.25%
2020	4,195	55.02%	3,369	44.18%	61	0.80%
2016	3,708	55.70%	2,670	40.11%	279	4.19%
2012	3,841	57.88%	2,721	41.00%	74	1.12%
2008	3,949	56.17%	2,982	42.42%	99	1.41%
2004	4,431	59.47%	2,945	39.52%	75	1.01%
2000	4,328	54.32%	3,280	41.16%	360	4.52%
1996	3,937	51.74%	2,828	37.17%	844	11.09%
1992	4,342	49.35%	2,763	31.40%	1,694	19.25%
1988	5,680	68.44%	2,415	29.10%	204	2.46%
1984	5,837	73.53%	2,081	26.22%	20	0.25%
1980	4,907	64.09%	2,002	26.15%	748	9.77%

As of March 2011, there were a total of 8,810 registered voters in Ocean City, of which 1,747 (19.8%) were registered as Democrats, 3,776 (42.9%) were registered as Republicans and 3,282 (37.3%) were registered as Unaffiliated. There were 5 voters registered as Libertarians or Greens.

Gubernatorial election results for Ocean City
Year	Republican		Democratic		Third party(ies)	
Year	No.	%	No.	%	No.	%
2025	3,399	57.16%	2,531	42.57%	16	0.27%
2021	3,265	61.40%	2,036	38.29%	17	0.32%
2017	2,092	53.74%	1,747	44.88%	54	1.39%
2013	3,436	75.75%	1,038	22.88%	62	1.37%
2009	2,894	58.56%	1,707	34.54%	341	6.90%
2005	2,746	58.13%	1,834	38.82%	144	3.05%

In the 2013 gubernatorial election, Republican Chris Christie received 75.7% of the vote (3,436 cast), ahead of Democrat Barbara Buono with 22.9% (1,038 votes), and other candidates with 1.4% (62 votes), among the 4,638 ballots cast by the city's 8,926 registered voters (102 ballots were spoiled), for a turnout of 52.0%. In the 2009 gubernatorial election, Republican Chris Christie received 58.2% of the vote (2,894 ballots cast), ahead of both Democrat Jon Corzine with 34.3% (1,707 votes) and Independent Chris Daggett with 6.1% (306 votes), with 4,976 ballots cast among the city's 9,008 registered voters, yielding a 55.2% turnout.

United States Senate election results for Ocean City1
Year	Republican		Democratic		Third party(ies)	
Year	No.	%	No.	%	No.	%
2024	3,857	57.28%	2,818	41.85%	59	0.88%
2018	3,437	61.30%	2,019	36.01%	151	2.69%
2012	3,394	56.47%	2,527	42.05%	89	1.48%
2006	3,053	61.49%	1,828	36.82%	84	1.69%

United States Senate election results for Ocean City2
Year	Republican		Democratic		Third party(ies)	
Year	No.	%	No.	%	No.	%
2020	4,143	55.98%	3,180	42.97%	78	1.05%
2014	2,340	59.08%	1,576	39.79%	45	1.14%
2013	1,739	61.75%	1,049	37.25%	28	0.99%
2008	3,676	58.39%	2,500	39.71%	120	1.91%

== Education ==
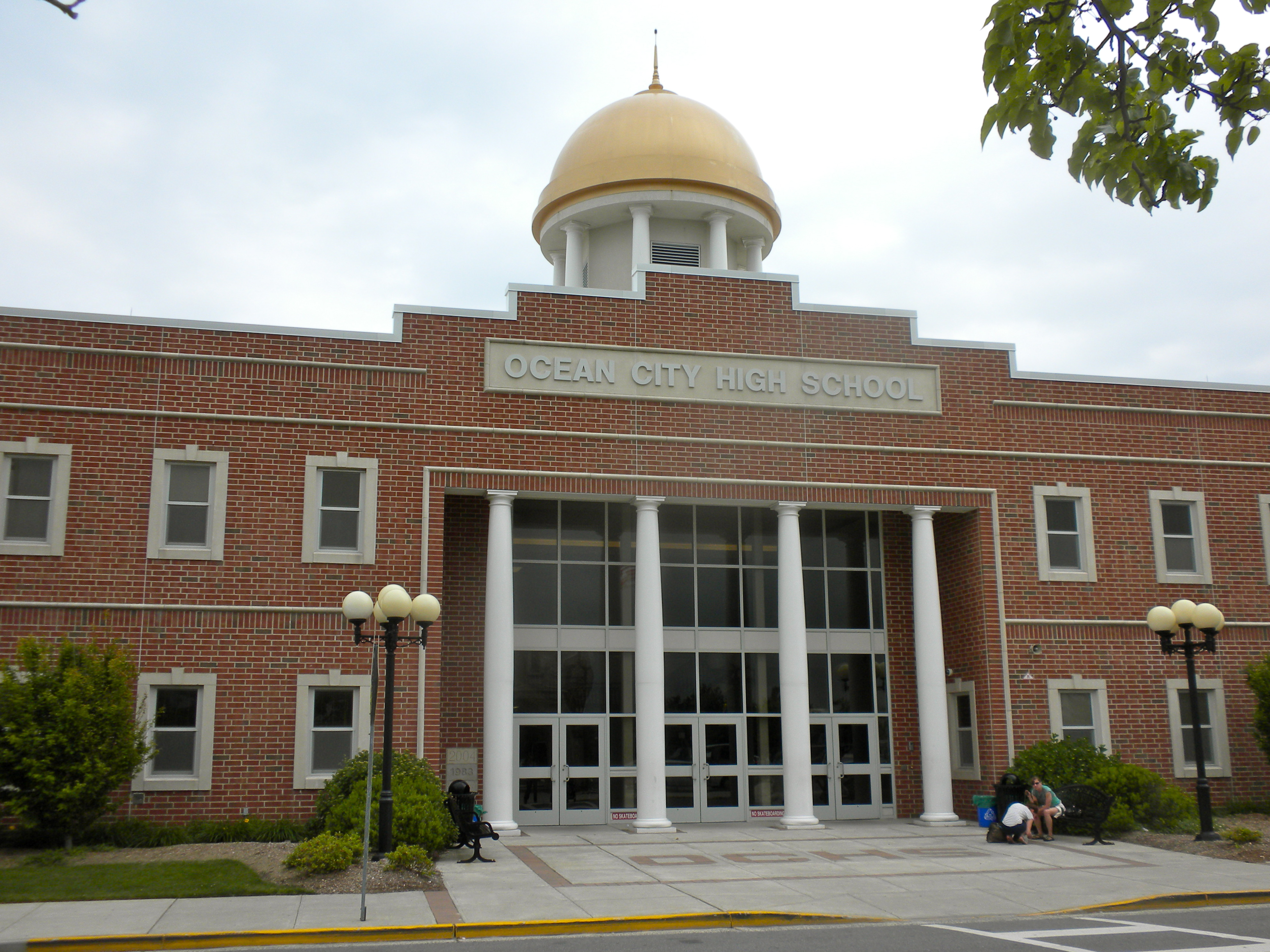
Ocean City High School

The Ocean City School District serves public school students in pre-kindergarten through twelfth grade. As of the 2022–23 school year, the district, comprised of three schools, had an enrollment of 1,877 students and 218.8 classroom teachers (on an FTE basis), for a student–teacher ratio of 8.6:1. Schools in the district (with 2022–23 enrollment data from the National Center for Education Statistics) are Ocean City Primary School with 280 students in grades PreK-3, Ocean City Intermediate School with 370 students in grades 4-8 and Ocean City High School with 1,215 students in grades 9-12.

Students from Corbin City, Longport, Sea Isle City and Upper Township attend Ocean City High School for ninth through twelfth grades as part of sending/receiving relationships with their respective school districts. Starting in the 2012-13 school year, all students from Sea Isle City in public school for pre-Kindergarten through twelfth grade attend Ocean City's public schools.

Students are also eligible to attend Cape May County Technical High School in the Cape May Court House area, which serves students from the entire county in its comprehensive and vocational programs, which are offered without charge to students who are county residents. Special needs students may be referred to Cape May County Special Services School District in the Cape May Court House area.

St. Augustine Regional School, a coeducational Catholic school for students in kindergarten through eighth grade, was closed by the Roman Catholic Diocese of Camden in June 2008. Bishop McHugh Regional Catholic School in Dennis Township had students attending from Ocean City.

Westminster Christian Academy, a K-12 Christian school, was located in Ocean City. In 2026 it acquired Southern Cape Christian School in Cape May Courthouse, then combined operations with that school in Cape May Courthouse.

== Transportation ==
In 2009, the Ocean City metropolitan statistical area (Cape May County) ranked as the sixth-highest in the United States for percentage of commuters who walked to work (8.4 percent).

=== Roads and highways ===
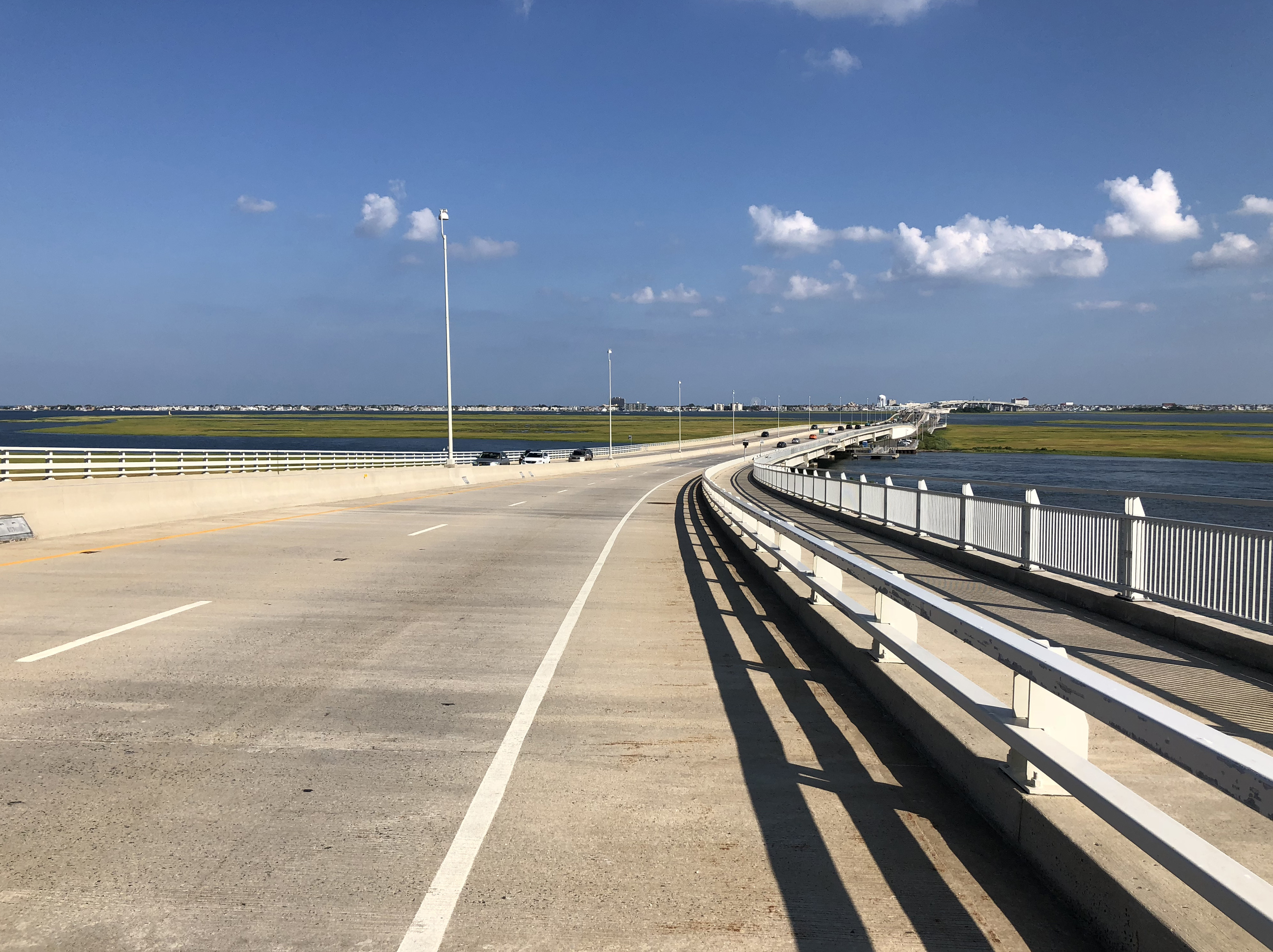
Route 52 southbound on the causeway between Somers Point and Ocean City

In 1883, the first drawbridge to the island opened at 34th Street, linking Ocean City with the rest of Cape May County. Financed by the Ocean City Association, the toll road was narrow, frequently under water, and built of shells, gravel, sand, and cedar poles; it was widened in 1909, replaced in 1914, and again replaced in 1964. The newer bridge at 34th street was refurbished in 2018. In 1914, a bridge connecting the island with Somers Point opened across the Great Egg Harbor Bay, which was replaced in 1932 and again in 2012. A road bridge connecting Ocean City and Strathmere opened in 1918, which was replaced in 1946 after being purchased by the county and made a part of Ocean Drive. The Ocean City Automobile Club built a bridge in the northern end of the island in 1928, connecting the island with Egg Harbor Township; the bridge was replaced in 2002.

As of May 2010, the city had a total of 126.07 miles (202.89 km) of roadways, of which 114.85 miles (184.83 km) were maintained by the municipality, 9.31 miles (14.98 km) by Cape May County and 1.91 miles (3.07 km) by the New Jersey Department of Transportation. Ocean City has bridge connections to the Marmora section of Upper Township by the 34th Street (Roosevelt Boulevard) Bridge, Egg Harbor Township by the Ocean City-Longport Bridge, Somers Point by the 9th Street Bridge (Route 52), and the Strathmere section of Upper Township by the Corson's Inlet Bridge.

=== Public transportation ===
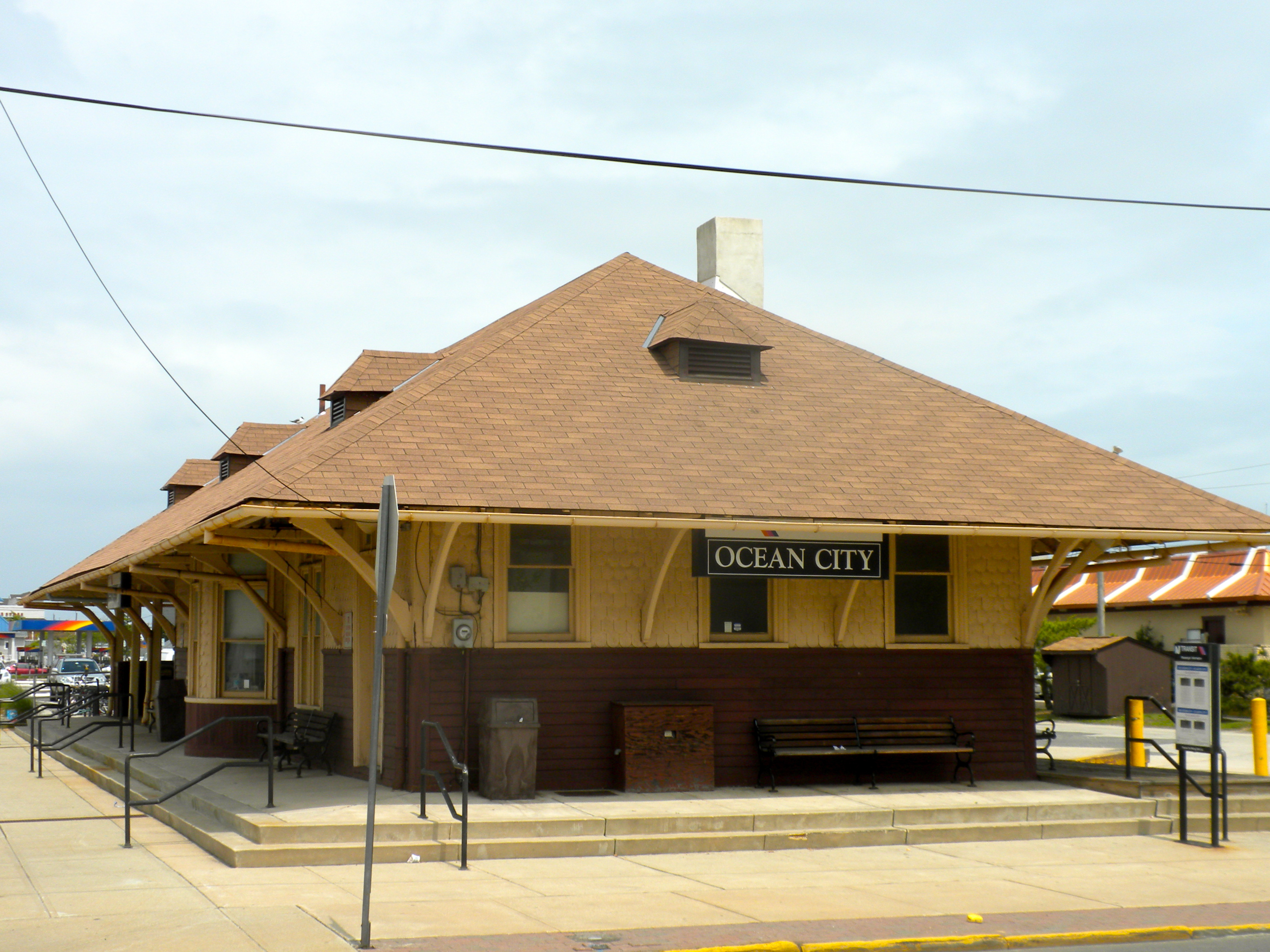
Ocean City Transportation Center, a former train station now used as a bus station by NJ Transit

NJ Transit provides bus service from the Ocean City Transportation Center to Atlantic City on the 507 and 509 routes. The agency also provides seasonal service from the Port Authority Bus Terminal in New York City to Cape May via Ocean City and other coastal towns. The city offers a summer Jitney service, with a route providing daily service on evenings from points between 59th Street and Battersea Road to the boardwalk.

Adjacent to the marshes of the Great Egg Harbor Bay is Ocean City Airport, officially known as Clarke Field. The airport was built in 1935 on what was previously a landfill, funded by the Works Progress Administration. The airport, still open to the public, operated at an annual loss of $150,000 for the city as of 2016.

Parking in the downtown and beach areas of Ocean City is regulated by on-street parking meters, metered parking lots, staffed parking lots, and permit parking lots. Parking meters and fees for parking lots are in effect between early May and early October. In addition to public parking, there are also several private parking lots in Ocean City.

=== Former transportation lines ===
In 1880, one year after Ocean City was established as a Christian resort, regular steamboat service from Somers Point began. In 1883, the Lake Brothers opened a streetcar line. In 1884, the West Jersey and Seashore Railroad extended its rail line from Sea Isle to the Ocean City Tenth Street Station. The line was replaced by buses in 1932. From 1906 to 1981, the Pennsylvania-Reading Seashore Lines operated rail service from Tuckahoe to Ocean City; service stopped when the Crook Horn bridge became damaged in 1981, and was eventually removed in 1992. After that time, rail tracks in Ocean City were removed from 9th to 34th streets. From 1907 to 1946, the Atlantic City & Shore Railroad operated a line from Atlantic City to Ocean City, until the bridge across the Great Egg Harbor Bay burned.

== Culture ==
Julia Lawlor of The New York Times wrote in 2004 that Christian heritage influenced Ocean City's conservative laws; prior to 1986, shops were not allowed to conduct business on Sundays. The Sunday business closures were heavily enforced, with a grocer being arrested for selling a cantaloupe. In 2004 there were 15 churches.

In 2011, the city played the backdrop to an episode of It's Always Sunny in Philadelphia titled "The Gang Goes to the Jersey Shore". The city was never name dropped and only serves to portray a generic shore town as the episode features many stereotypes about the Jersey Shore and its culture, most of which negative. At the time of airing the episode caused backlash with many members of the community, citing the episode's raunchy nature in contrast to the family-friendly image Ocean City claims to have.

== Climate ==
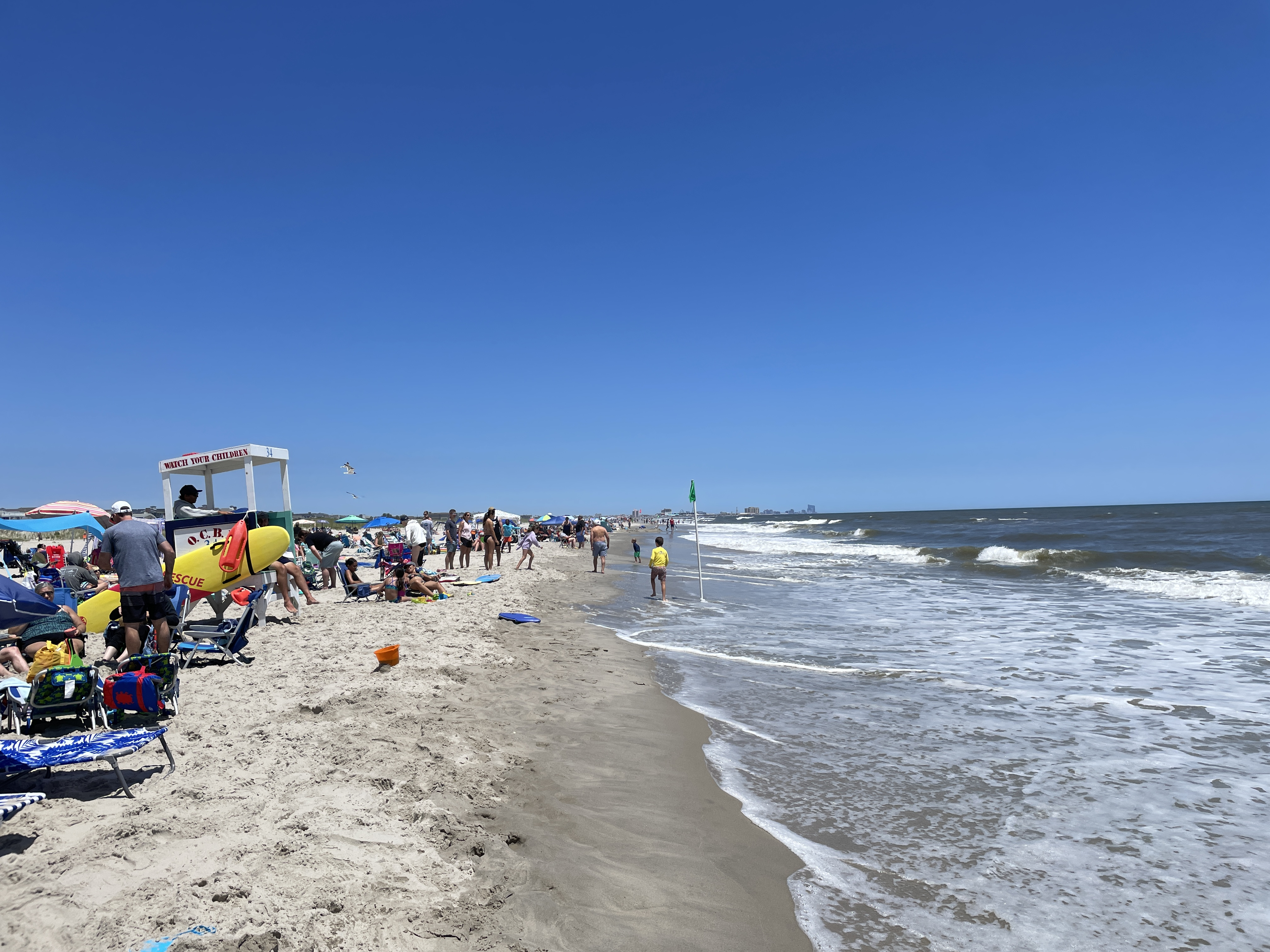
Ocean City beach at 34th Street

According to the Köppen climate classification system, Ocean City has a humid subtropical climate (Cfa) with hot, moderately humid summers, cool winters and year-round precipitation. Cfa climates are characterized by all months having an average mean temperature above 32.0 °F (0.0 °C), at least four months with an average mean temperature at or above 50.0 °F (10.0 °C), at least one month with an average mean temperature at or above 71.6 °F (22.0 °C) and no significant precipitation difference between seasons. During the summer months in Ocean City, a cooling afternoon sea breeze is present on most days, but episodes of extreme heat and humidity can occur with heat index values at or above 95.0 °F (35.0 °C). During the winter months, episodes of extreme cold and wind can occur with wind chill values below 0.0 °F (−17.8 °C). The plant hardiness zone at Ocean City Beach is 7b with an average annual extreme minimum air temperature of 6.0 °F (−14.4 °C). The average seasonal (November–April) snowfall total is 12 to 18 inches (30 to 46 cm), and the average snowiest month is February which corresponds with the annual peak in nor'easter activity.

Former Hurricane Sandy struck 12 mi (19 km) north of the city on October 29, 2012, causing severe storm surge flooding and 70 mph (110 km/h) wind gusts. The Bayside Center recorded a high tide of 9.31 ft (2.84 m) during Sandy, surpassing the previous tidal record set in 1944. The storm caused major to severe damage to 29% of the houses in Ocean City, incurring a financial loss of $15.5 million to the tax base.

Climate data for Ocean City Beach, NJ (1981–2010 Averages)
Month	Jan	Feb	Mar	Apr	May	Jun	Jul	Aug	Sep	Oct	Nov	Dec	Year
Mean daily maximum °F (°C)	41.5 (5.3)	43.8 (6.6)	50.8 (10.4)	60.4 (15.8)	69.7 (20.9)	78.5 (25.8)	83.2 (28.4)	81.9 (27.7)	76.3 (24.6)	65.7 (18.7)	56.3 (13.5)	46.4 (8.0)	63.0 (17.2)
Daily mean °F (°C)	33.7 (0.9)	35.8 (2.1)	42.3 (5.7)	51.7 (10.9)	61.0 (16.1)	70.2 (21.2)	75.3 (24.1)	74.2 (23.4)	68.0 (20.0)	57.1 (13.9)	47.9 (8.8)	38.5 (3.6)	54.7 (12.6)
Mean daily minimum °F (°C)	25.8 (−3.4)	27.7 (−2.4)	33.7 (0.9)	42.9 (6.1)	52.3 (11.3)	61.8 (16.6)	67.5 (19.7)	66.6 (19.2)	59.7 (15.4)	48.6 (9.2)	39.4 (4.1)	30.5 (−0.8)	46.5 (8.1)
Average precipitation inches (mm)	3.32 (84)	2.90 (74)	4.25 (108)	3.69 (94)	3.40 (86)	3.13 (80)	3.66 (93)	4.24 (108)	3.29 (84)	3.64 (92)	3.37 (86)	3.81 (97)	42.70 (1,085)
Average relative humidity (%)	67.5	65.6	62.5	62.7	67.3	71.6	71.9	74.1	72.4	71.6	68.9	68.1	68.7
Average dew point °F (°C)	24.1 (−4.4)	25.4 (−3.7)	30.4 (−0.9)	39.4 (4.1)	50.1 (10.1)	60.6 (15.9)	65.6 (18.7)	65.4 (18.6)	58.8 (14.9)	48.0 (8.9)	38.2 (3.4)	28.9 (−1.7)	44.7 (7.1)
Source: PRISM

Climate data for Atlantic City, NJ Ocean Water Temperature (12 NE Ocean City)
Month	Jan	Feb	Mar	Apr	May	Jun	Jul	Aug	Sep	Oct	Nov	Dec	Year
Daily mean °F (°C)	37 (3)	35 (2)	42 (6)	48 (9)	56 (13)	63 (17)	70 (21)	73 (23)	70 (21)	61 (16)	53 (12)	44 (7)	54 (12)
Source: NOAA

== Ecology ==
According to the A. W. Kuchler U.S. potential natural vegetation types, Ocean City would have a dominant vegetation type of Northern Cordgrass (73) with a dominant vegetation form of Coastal Prairie (20).

The marsh around the Welcome Center (on the road through the marsh to Somers Point) provides a rookery for numerous large wading birds, including the Great Egret, Glossy Ibis, and (since 2020) American White Ibis.

== Notable people ==
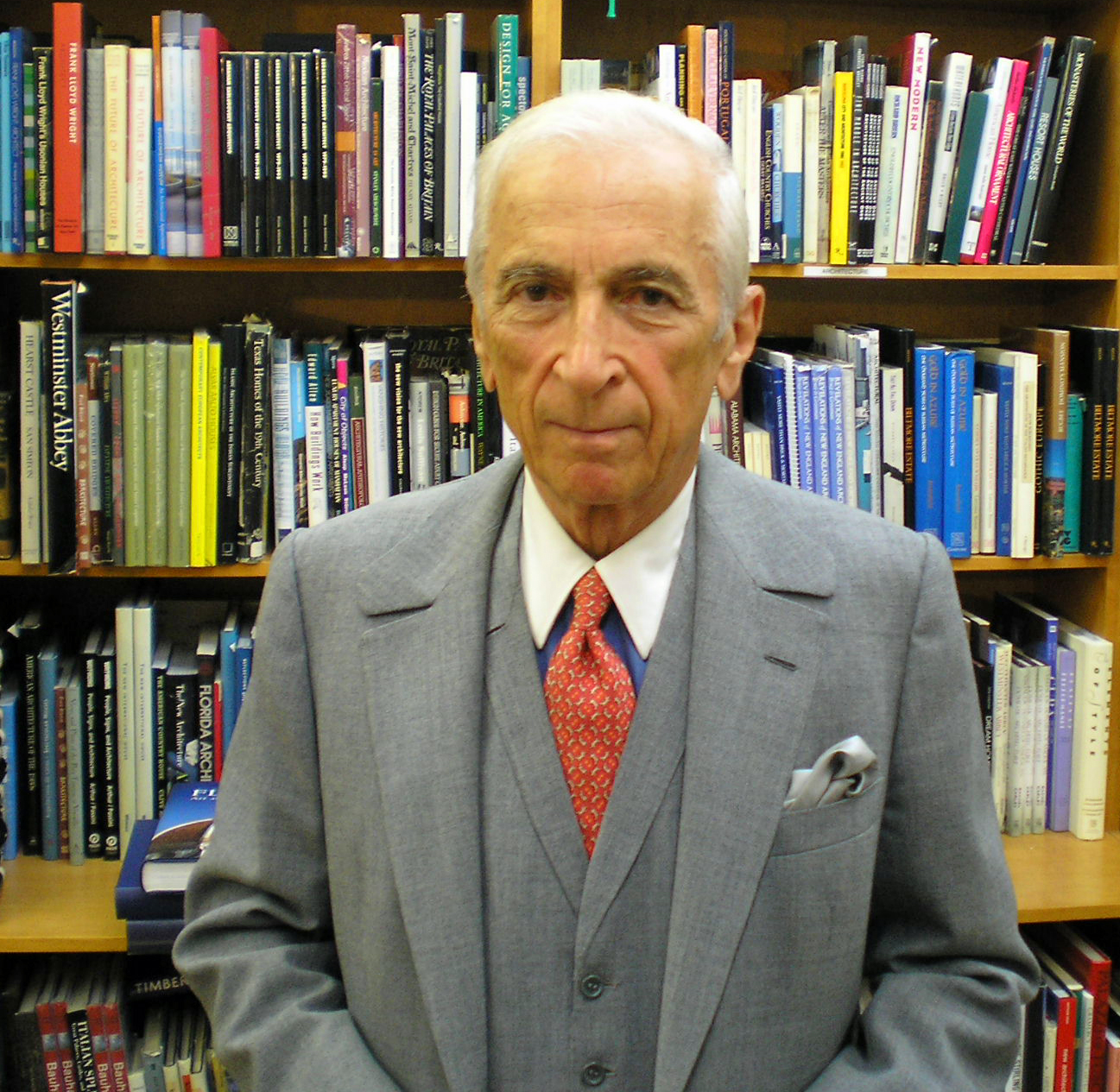
Author Gay Talese from Ocean City

People who were born in, residents of, or otherwise closely associated with Ocean City include:

- Marla Adams (born 1938), television actress, The Secret Storm and The Young and the Restless
- David Akers (born 1974), former NFL kicker
- A. R. Ammons (1926–2001), author and poet, winner of the National Book Award
- Keith Andes (1920–2005), film, radio, musical theatre, stage and television actor
- Andy Boswell (1873–1936), Major League Baseball pitcher for the Washington Senators and New York Giants and former New Jersey General Assembly member
- Benjamin Burnley (born 1978), musician, singer, songwriter, and record producer and lead singer of Breaking Benjamin
- Maurice Catarcio (1929–2005), former WWE professional wrestler and The Guinness Book of World Records record holder
- Pat Croce (born 1954), former owner of the Philadelphia 76ers
- Walter Diemer (1904–1998), inventor of bubble gum
- Josiah E. DuBois Jr. (1913–1983), former U.S. Treasury Department official who played a major role in exposing State Department obstruction of efforts to provide American visa to Jews trying to escape Nazi Europe
- Stephen Dunn (1939–2021), poet
- Frank J. Esposito (born 1941), historian who was named by independent candidate Christopher Daggett as his ticket's candidate for Lieutenant Governor of New Jersey in 2009
- Preston Foster (1900–1970), stage, film, radio, and television actor
- Stephanie Gaitley (born 1960), head women's basketball coach, Fordham University
- Andrew Golota (born 1968), boxer
- Anne Heche (1969−2022), actress, Volcano and Psycho
- Daniel J. Hilferty (born c. 1957), president and CEO of Independence Blue Cross
- William J. Hughes (1932–2019), former member of U.S. House of Representatives, representing New Jersey's 2nd congressional district
- Grace Kelly (1929–1982), Academy Award-winning actress, and Princess of Monaco
- Kurt Loder (born 1945), former editor of Rolling Stone magazine and MTV anchor
- Michael Lombardi (born 1959), pro football executive, former general manager of the Cleveland Browns
- Catherine McCabe, former acting Administrator of the Environmental Protection Agency and commissioner of the New Jersey Department of Environmental Protection
- Antwan McClellan, politician who has represented the 1st Legislative District in the New Jersey General Assembly since 2020
- Cecilia McCormick, academic administrator and lawyer who has served as president of the Maryland Institute College of Art since 2024
- Ed Rendell (born 1944), former Governor of Pennsylvania
- George Savitsky (1924–2012), former professional football player, Philadelphia Eagles
- Dominic Sessa (born 2002), actor who made his film debut in Alexander Payne's 2023 coming-of-age film The Holdovers
- Thomas J. Shusted (1926–2004), attorney and politician who served in the New Jersey General Assembly, representing Legislative District 3D from 1970 to 1972 and the 6th Legislative District from 1978 to 1991
- James Stewart (1908–1997), actor
- Gay Talese (born 1932), author
- Walter Trout (born 1951), blues musician
- Roland Wiggins (1932–2019), music theorist and educator

== Historic places ==
- Ocean City 34th Street Station (demolished)
- Ocean City City Hall
- Ocean City Life-Saving Station
- Ocean City Residential Historic District
- Ocean City Tenth Street Station
- The Flanders Hotel

== Locale ==
Preceded by Longport	Beaches of New Jersey	Succeeded by Strathmere
