= Ocean City Tenth Street Station =

Bus station in Ocean City, New Jersey

10th Street
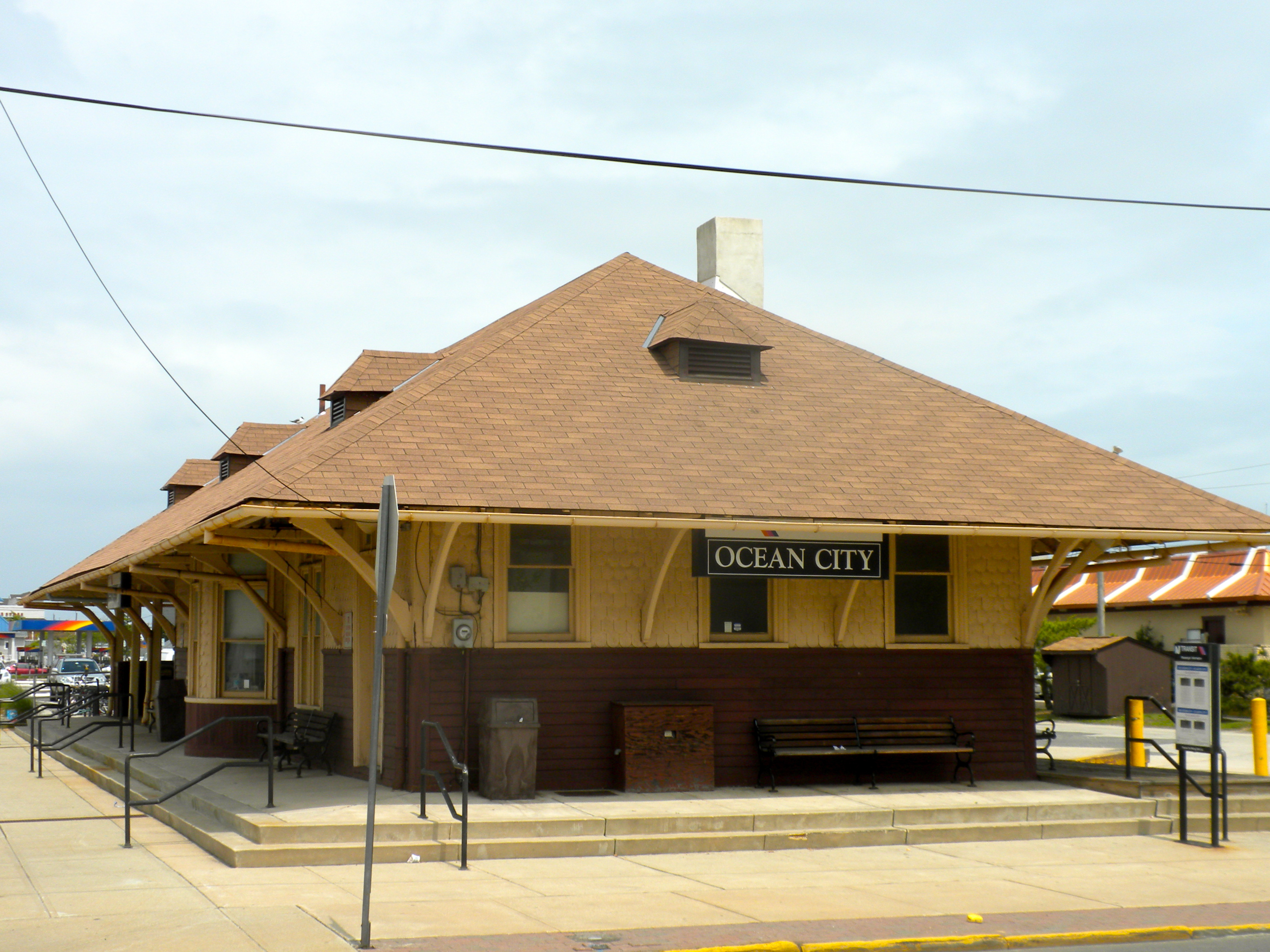
- Ocean City Tenth Street Station in 2010

General information
- Location: 10th Street and Haven Avenue, Ocean City, New Jersey
- Coordinates: 39°16′44″N 74°34′43″W
- Bus routes: 3
- Bus operators: NJ Transit

Construction
- Accessible: yes

History
- Closed: August 13, 1981

Former services
| Preceding station | Pennsylvania-Reading Seashore Lines | Following station |
|---|---|---|
| Ocean City 14th Street toward Tuckahoe | ACRR Ocean City Branch | Ocean City 4th Street toward Ocean City Gardens |
- Ocean City Tenth Street Station
- U.S. National Register of Historic Places
- New Jersey Register of Historic Places
- Location within Cape May County, New Jersey Location within New Jersey Location within the United States
- Area: 0.5 acres (0.20 ha)
- Built: 1898
- Architect: William Hunter
- Architectural style: Shingle Style
- MPS: Operating Passenger Railroad Stations TR
- NRHP reference No.: 84002610
- NJRHP No.: 1010

Significant dates
- Added to NRHP: June 22, 1984
- Designated NJRHP: March 17, 1984
Location

Ocean City Tenth Street Station is located in Ocean City in Cape May County, New Jersey. Built in 1898, it served rail service until 1981. The building now operates as the Ocean City Transportation Center, which is a bus stop for NJ Transit.

In 2012, the building was damaged after being flooded by Hurricane Sandy, and was reconstructed to its historic appearance.

== History ==
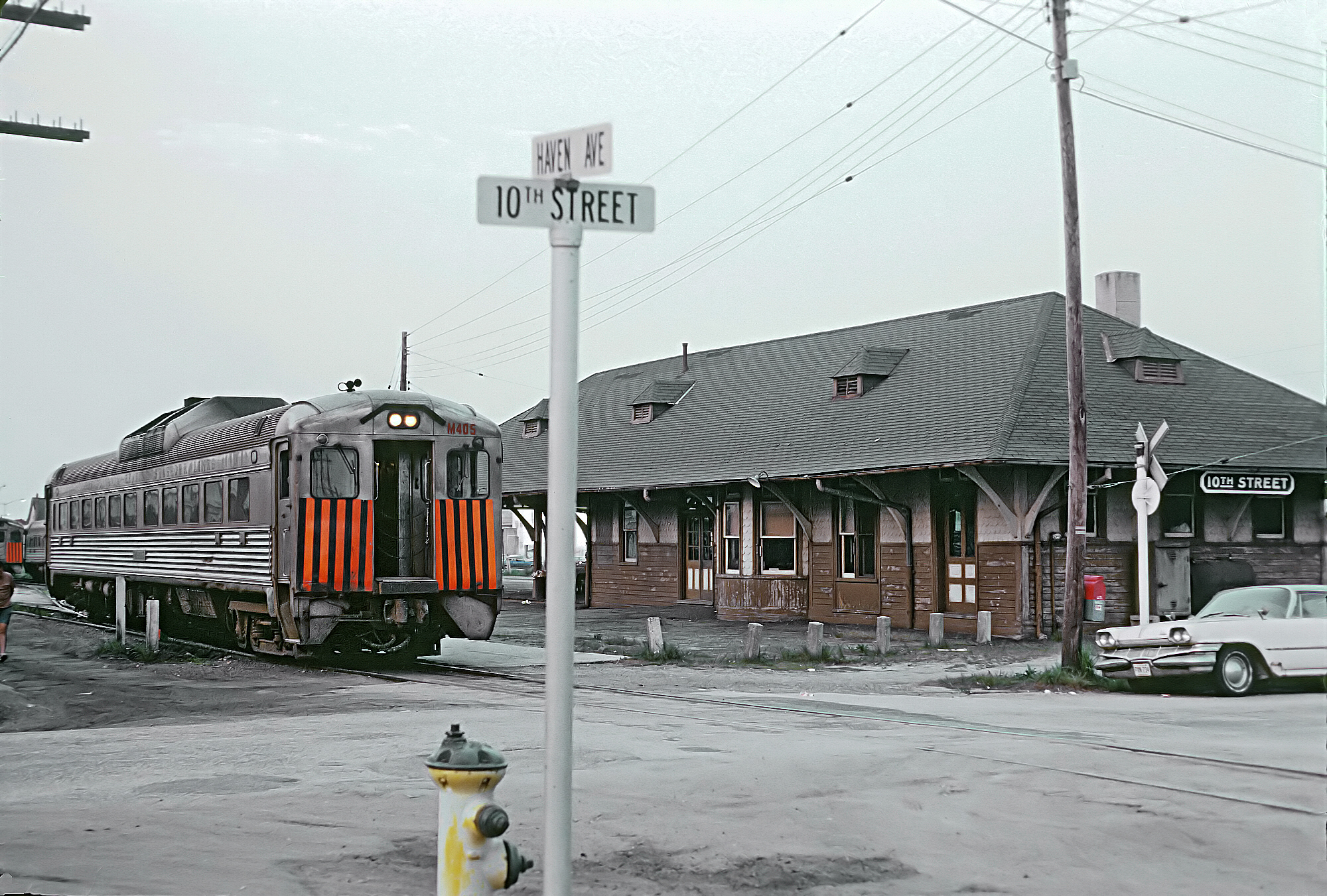
Pennsylvania-Reading Seashore Lines trains at 10th Street in 1970

The station was built in 1898 by the Ocean City Railroad, which was acquired by the Atlantic City Railroad in 1901, and later by the Pennsylvania-Reading Seashore Lines. Trains last served the station in August 1981, when service was cancelled due to poor track conditions and limited funding from the New Jersey Department of Transportation. The architect was probably William Hunter, assistant chief engineer of the Philadelphia and Reading Railroad. Tenth Street Station was added to the National Register of Historic Places on June 22, 1984 for its significance in architecture and history. Now known as the Ocean City Transportation Center, the building is in use as a NJ Transit bus station.

In October 2012, the Transportation Center was damaged during floods caused by Hurricane Sandy. Due to the building's historic nature, special reconstruction was required to restore the building's appearance between 1890 and 1910. This included adding a Queen Anne style turret. In August 2014, Ocean City awarded a $522,826 contract to TNT Construction Company, Inc. of Deptford, using a $501,000 grant from the Historic Preservation Fund.

== Destinations ==
NJ Transit operates bus routes 319, 507, and 509 out of the Ocean City Transportation Center. Bus route 319 provides limited seasonal service from Ocean City to the Port Authority Bus Terminal in Midtown Manhattan. Bus routes 507 and 509 run daily from Ocean City to Atlantic City via the Atlantic County mainland.

== See also ==
- List of New Jersey Transit bus routes (500–549)
- National Register of Historic Places listings in Cape May County, New Jersey
- Operating Passenger Railroad Stations Thematic Resource (New Jersey)
- Ocean City 34th Street Station – a historic rail station that has been demolished
