= Kirk W. Conover =

American politician

Member of the New Jersey General Assembly from the 2nd district
- In office June 2003 – January 10, 2006
- Preceded by: Paul R. D'Amato
- Succeeded by: Jim Whelan

Chairman of the Atlantic County Board of Chosen Freeholders
- In office 2000–2003
- Preceded by: Dennis Levinson
- Succeeded by: Frank Finnerty

Member of the Atlantic County Board of Chosen Freeholders from the 4th district
- In office 1981–2003
- Preceded by: Jerry Savell
- Succeeded by: Sue Schilling

Personal details
- Born: April 17, 1954 (age 72)
- Party: Republican
- Education: Rutgers University (BA); University of Pennsylvania (MBA)

Kirk W. Conover (born April 17, 1954) is an American Republican Party politician, who served in the New Jersey General Assembly representing the 2nd legislative district from 2003 to 2006. Conover was sworn into the Assembly in June 2003 after selection to fill the vacancy created by the resignation of Assemblyman Paul D'Amato. Conover served in the Assembly on the Telecommunications and Utilities and the Tourism and Gaming Committees.

== Biography ==
On Election Day, November 8, 2005, former Atlantic City Mayor Jim Whelan, a Democrat, defeated Republican Conover in the Republican-leaning District.

Assemblyman Conover served on the Atlantic County Board of Chosen Freeholders from 1981 to 2003, serving as its Chairman in 1992, 1995 and from 2000 to 2003.

Conover graduated with a B.A. from Rutgers University in Economics and was awarded an M.B.A. from the University of Pennsylvania in Business Administration. He is a V.P. and Licensed Insurance Producer, Shore Agency, Inc. and a Licensed Realtor, Tilton Real Estate, Inc. Kirk married his wife Nancy in Hawaii in 2000 and has 3 stepsons.

== District 2 ==
Each of the forty districts in the New Jersey Legislature has one representative in the New Jersey Senate and two members in the New Jersey General Assembly. The other representatives from the 2nd Legislative District are:

- Assemblyman Francis J. Blee, and
- Senator William Gormley

Preceded by Jerry Savell	Atlantic County Freeholder - District 4; 1981-2003	Succeeded by Sue Schilling
Preceded by Dennis Levinson	Atlantic County Freeholder Chairman; 2000-2003	Succeeded by Frank Finnerty
Preceded by Paul D'Amato	New Jersey General Assembly - 2nd District; 2003-2006	Succeeded by Jim Whelan
