= Paul R. D'Amato =

Member of the New Jersey General Assembly

Member of the New Jersey General Assembly from the 2nd district
- In office January 8, 2002 – May 16, 2003 Serving with Francis J. Blee
- Preceded by: Kenneth LeFevre
- Succeeded by: Kirk W. Conover

Personal details
- Born: Paul Richard D'Amato; April 20, 1947 (age 79) Atlantic City, New Jersey, U.S.
- Party: Republican
- Spouse: Sandra D'Amato (m. 1970)
- Children: 3
- Education: Mount St. Mary's College (BA); Georgetown University (JD)
- Website: damatolawfirm.com

Paul Richard D'Amato (born July 19, 1947) is an American lawyer and a Republican Party politician who represented the 2nd Legislative District in the New Jersey General Assembly from 2002 until he resigned in May 2003.

== Early life and education ==
Paul Richard D'Amato was born in Atlantic City, New Jersey to parents William D'Amato and Grace D'Amato. He was raised in nearby Margate City and Linwood. He was named for his uncle, Paul "Skinny" D'Amato, owner of the 500 Club in Atlantic City. He is of Italian descent and was raised Catholic.

D'Amato attended Blessed Sacrament Grammar School in Margate City, graduating in 1961, and Atlantic City High School, graduating in 1965. He earned his undergraduate degree from Mount Saint Mary’s College and Seminary in Emmitsburg, Maryland, in 1969, and received a Juris Doctor from Georgetown University Law School in Washington, D.C., in 1974. D'Amato later entered public service and became mayor of Linwood in 2000.

== New Jersey Assembly ==
With incumbent Kenneth LeFevre not running for re-election, D'Amato was chosen by Republicans to take his place. D'Amato, running together with Republican incumbent Francis J. Blee, defeated Democrats Dianna W. Fauntleroy and Fred Scerni in the 2001 New Jersey General Assembly election. He resigned from office on May 16, 2003, and his vacant seat was filled by Kirk W. Conover, who was serving on the Atlantic County Board of Chosen Freeholders.

== Electoral history ==
New Jersey general election, 2001
Party	Candidate	Votes	%
Republican	Paul R. D'Amato	29,427	28.1
Republican	Francis J. Blee	29,010	27.7
Democratic	Fred Scerni	22,833	21.8
Democratic	Dianna W. Fauntleroy	22,597	21.6
Green	Robert Paul Gabrielsky	941	0.9
Total votes		104,808	100.0

== Legal career ==
After earning his Juris Doctor from Georgetown University in 1974, D’Amato was admitted to the bar and began practicing law in South Jersey. He established a private practice focused on civil litigation, including personal injury matters, and later founded the D’Amato Law Firm, based in Atlantic County, New Jersey.

Over the course of his career, D’Amato has represented clients in a wide range of personal injury and negligence cases, including motor vehicle accidents and premises liability claims. His practice has remained active for decades, and he has worked alongside members of his family, including his wife, who is the firm's CFO, and his daughter, attorney Alexa D’Amato Barrera, who is a partner at the firm.

== Personal life ==
D'Amato currently resides in his hometown of Linwood. He has been married to his wife, Sandra, since 1970. The couple has three daughters: Alexa, Ava, and Ashley.
