= Paul D'Amato (disambiguation) =

Paul D'Amato (1908–1984) was an Atlantic City nightclub owner.

Paul D'Amato may also refer to:

- Paul D'Amato (actor), (1949–2024), American actor
- Paul R. D'Amato (born 1947), American politician
- Paul D'Amato (photographer), (1956), Photographer
