= James J. McCullough =

American politician (born 1942)

Member of the New Jersey Senate from the 2nd district
- In office February 2007 – January 2008
- Preceded by: William Gormley
- Succeeded by: Jim Whelan

Personal details
- Born: January 11, 1942 (age 84) Atlantic City, New Jersey, US
- Party: Republican
- Education: Rutgers University

James J. "Sonny" McCullough (born January 11, 1942) is an American Republican Party politician, who served in the New Jersey State Senate from 2007 to 2008, where he represented the 2nd Legislative District.

== Biography ==
Born on January 11, 1942, in Atlantic City, New Jersey, McCullough graduated in 1960 from Atlantic City High School. He attended Rutgers University with a major in public works management, and Rider College majoring in business.

On November 6, 2007, McCullough lost his re-election bid, having been ousted by Democratic Party New Jersey General Assembly member Jim Whelan.

McCullough succeeded Senator William Gormley, who announced in January 2007 that he would not seek reelection to the State Senate. Gormley had indicated that he will support District 2 Assemblyman Francis J. Blee as his successor, and Gormley stepped down on February 15, 2007. Despite Gormley's endorsement McCullough defeated Blee for the interim spot.

McCullough served in the Senate on the Labor Committee and the Wagering, Tourism and Historic Preservation Committee.

McCullough has served on the Egg Harbor Township Committee and has been mayor of Egg Harbor Township since 1996, in addition to mayoral stints in 1986 and from 1988 to 1992. He was a member of the township's Planning Board since 1996 (and also in 1986 and from 1988 to 1992). McCullough served as Municipal Utilities Authority Commissioner 2000-06 and on the Zoning Board from 1976 to 1980.

McCullough lives in Atlantic City. He and his wife Georgene, have four sons, Jim, George, William (Sonny) and Sean, and five grandchildren.

| Preceded by William Gormley | New Jersey State Senator - 2nd Legislative District; February 2007 - January 2008 | Succeeded by Jim Whelan |
