= John F. Gaffney =

American politician

Member of the New Jersey General Assembly from the 2nd district
- In office January 14, 1992 – August 27, 1995 Serving with Frederick P. Nickles and Tom Foley
- Preceded by: Dolores G. Cooper and Fred Scerni
- Succeeded by: Francis J. Blee

Personal details
- Born: March 23, 1934 Atlantic City, New Jersey, U.S.
- Died: August 27, 1995 (aged 61) Egg Harbor Township, New Jersey, U.S.
- Party: Republican
- Spouse: Carol Crane (m. 1986)
- Children: 6

John F. Gaffney (March 23, 1934 – August 27, 1995) was an American Republican Party politician who served in the New Jersey General Assembly, where he represented the 2nd Legislative District from 1992 until his death. He had previously served as a city council member and mayor, as well as in the county legislature.

== Early life ==
He was born in Atlantic City, New Jersey on March 23, 1934.

== Career ==
From 1974 to 1976, Gaffney served on the Linwood, New Jersey City Council and was elected to serve as the city's mayor from 1976 to 1980. He was a member of the Atlantic County, New Jersey Board of Chosen Freeholders from 1979 to 1992. He had been president of both the Atlantic County Mayors Association and the South Jersey Freeholders Association. As Freeholder Director in 1989, Gaffney supported a ballot initiative that would allow voters to reduce insurance premiums, which have been among the highest in the nation, through the elimination of an annual $150 fee assessed on each vehicle that goes toward funding coverage for high-risk drivers.

=== New Jersey General Assembly ===
Darryl F. Todd had won the June 1991 primary as one of the two Republican Assembly challengers in the 2nd District, covering portions of Atlantic County. Todd begged off, citing the impact of a legislative career on his legal practice, and a special meeting of the Republican county committee was held on August 18, at which Gaffney was chosen to fill Todd's vacated ballot slot. With incumbent Republican Dolores G. Cooper having chosen not to run for re-election, Gaffney ran together in the 1991 general election with fellow newcomer Egg Harbor Township Schools superintendent Frederick P. Nickles against one-term incumbent Democrat Fred Scerni and his running mate, Atlantic County freeholder Tom Foley; Gaffney and Nickles ran on a platform opposing income tax hikes, pushing for a one-percent reduction in the 7% state sales tax rate and targeting school funding to Abbott districts. Gaffney and Nickles were both elected in the strong backlash against Governor James Florio's income tax hikes, with the one seat gained in the 2nd District helping shift the Assembly from a 44–36 margin in favor of the Democrats in the 1990–1991 session to a 58–22 margin for the Republicans at the start of the 1992–1993 legislative session.

As chairman of the Tourism and Gaming Committee in the Assembly, Gaffney was an advocate for legislation that was signed into law which allowed the New Jersey Casino Control Commission to expand the number of games and slot machines at casinos, as well as to allow for the expansion of gambling around the clock. The Atlantic City Convention Center was constructed using funds from the Economic Recovery Fund that Gaffney helped create.

In 1993, Gaffney cosponsored legislation that allowed deer hunters to donate venison to charities for the needy after being processed by butchers; Gaffney's bill, signed into law in 1993 by Governor Florio, included controls that would provide for state inspection and ensure that meat could be tracked back to the hunter in case of any health issues.

In October 1994, Gaffney proposed an amendment to a bill governing gambling in Atlantic City that would expand the limit of casino licenses owned by one operator from three to four, a proposal that would benefit Donald Trump; then-mayor of Atlantic City Jim Whelan argued against the proposal, citing Trump's "record of attempting to limit competition from other casinos in Atlantic City", and the fact that all three of his casino properties had been through bankruptcy filings within the previous four years.

He was succeeded by Francis J. Blee, a city council member in Absecon who was selected as his replacement by the Republican county committee and sworn into office on September 18, 1995. Blee went on to win election in November 1995 to serve a full two-year term and the balance of Gaffney's term.

== Personal life ==
A resident of Egg Harbor Township, New Jersey, Gaffney died at the age of 61 of an apparent heart attack at his home there on August 28, 1995. He was survived by his wife, Carol Crane, and his six daughters; a previous marriage ended in divorce.
