= Dolores G. Cooper =

American politician (1922–1999)

Member of the New Jersey General Assembly from the 2nd Legislative District
- In office November 1982 – January 14, 1992 Serving with J. Edward Kline and Fred Scerni
- Preceded by: William Gormley
- Succeeded by: John F. Gaffney; Frederick P. Nickles

Personal details
- Born: November 2, 1922 Baltimore, Maryland, U.S.
- Died: January 15, 1999 (aged 76) Somers Point, New Jersey, U.S.
- Party: Republican

Dolores G. Cooper (November 2, 1922 – January 15, 1999) was an American politician. She served in the New Jersey General Assembly as a Republican.

== Political career ==
Cooper got involved in politics whist working for the War Department as a cryptographer where she was stationed in Anchorage, Alaska. During her time there, she started to campaign for Alaskan statehood on the grounds that the Territory of Alaska was not getting the federal funding she felt it was entitled to. She moved to Atlantic City, New Jersey and then to Linwood, New Jersey. She got involved in New Jersey politics in 1971 after being on the campaign team for her gynaecologist Dr Joseph McGahn, whom got elected to the New Jersey General Assembly as a Democrat. She changed parties to become a Republican in 1974. She was elected as a Freeholder in 1979 after being proposed by the Republican Party.

Cooper served as an Atlantic County, New Jersey freeholder. Cooper the served in the New Jersey General Assembly from 1982 to 1992 after winning a by-election. In 1986, she ran for Mayor of Atlantic City, against the wishes of the national and New Jersey Republican Party, but lost to incumbent James Usry. She continued to serve in the General Assembly until 1992. Cooper died at Shore Medical Center in Somers Point, New Jersey.

== Personal life ==
Cooper was born in Baltimore, Maryland, Cooper was a public relations consultant. Cooper's daughter became the Vice-Chair of the New Jersey Casino Control Commission. Her grandson became the Chief Prosecutor of Atlantic City. She was Jewish.
