= Kenneth LeFevre =

Member of the New Jersey General Assembly

Kenneth C. LeFevre

Member of the New Jersey General Assembly from the 2nd district
- In office January 9, 1996 – January 8, 2002 Serving with Francis J. Blee
- Preceded by: Tom Foley
- Succeeded by: Paul R. D'Amato

Personal details
- Born: January 18, 1945 (age 81)
- Party: Republican
- Education: Camden County College; Rutgers University-Camden

Kenneth C. LeFevre (born January 18, 1945) is an American Republican Party politician. He served three terms in the New Jersey General Assembly, from 1996 to 2002, where he represented the 2nd Legislative District.

== Early career ==
LeFevre attended Camden County College, where he earned an associate's degree in marketing, and he earned a bachelor's degree with a major in management from Rutgers University-Camden. He served in the United States Coast Guard from 1964 to 1968, attaining the rank of Petty Officer First Class. He was employed as director of economic development for Atlantic Electric.

LeFevre served on the Folsom Borough Council from 1976 to 1978. He was a member of the Atlantic County Board of Chosen Freeholders from 1978 to 1983 and again from 1991 to 1996, where he served as chair in 1993 and as vice chair from 1978 to 1983. LeFevre was a member of the board of directors of the Delaware River Port Authority from 1994 to 1996.

== Assemblyman ==
He was elected to the General Assembly in 1995 together with Francis J. Blee, and the two were re-elected in 1995 and 1997. He served in the Assembly as assistant majority whip starting in 1998, served as vice chair of the Labor Committee as well as being a member of the Commerce, Tourism, Gaming and Military and Veterans' Affairs Committee.

Beginning in 1995, representatives of the Delaware Tribe of Western Oklahoma expressed their desire to open a casino in Wildwood, New Jersey, going so far as to file a suit in New Jersey Superior Court against the city of Wildwood in March 1998, claiming that the land originally belonged to the tribe. Shortly after filing, the tribe dropped the suit of its own accord, but the events prompted LeFevre and fellow Assemblyman George Geist to propose legislation asking Congress to amend the Indian Gaming Regulatory Act to require authorization at the state level before allowing a Native American gambling enterprise to open. LeFevre cited a concern that "Indian gaming" would cause a reduction in tax revenue from casinos in Atlantic City.

In 2000, LeFevre introduced legislation to ban motorized scooters and skateboards on streets, sidewalks and parks, and would impose fines of as much as $1,000 on those violating the ban; LeFevre noted that they are typically "unregistered, uninsured and operated by unlicensed drivers" in their teens who are unfamiliar with the rules of the road. The bill passed unanimously in the Assembly.

After LeFevre decided not to run for re-election, Linwood mayor Paul D'Amato took LeFevre's place on the 2001 Republican ticket with Blee. Both won.

New Jersey General Assembly
| Preceded by Tom Foley | Member of the New Jersey General Assembly from the 2nd district 1996–2002 | Succeeded by Paul R. D'Amato |
| Preceded by Guy R. Gregg | Majority Whip of the New Jersey General Assembly; 2000–2002 | Succeeded by Peter J. Barnes III |
