= Vincent J. Polistina =

Member of the New Jersey Senate

Vince Polistina

Member of the New Jersey Senate from the 2nd district
- Incumbent
- Assumed office November 8, 2021
- Preceded by: Chris A. Brown

Member of the New Jersey General Assembly from the 2nd district
- In office January 8, 2008 – January 10, 2012 Serving with John F. Amodeo
- Preceded by: Francis J. Blee; Jim Whelan
- Succeeded by: Chris A. Brown

Personal details
- Born: Vincent Joseph Polistina; June 10, 1971 (age 55) Galloway Township, New Jersey, U.S.
- Party: Republican
- Spouse: Carolyn Polistina
- Education: Rutgers University (BS)
- Website: State Senate website

Vincent Joseph Polistina (born June 10, 1971) is an American Republican politician who has served in the New Jersey Senate since 2021. He previously served in the New Jersey General Assembly, where he represented the 2nd Legislative District from 2008 to 2012.

== Early life and education ==
A lifelong resident of Atlantic County, Polistina grew up in Galloway Township and graduated from Absegami High School in 1989.

Polistina received a B.A. from Rutgers University with a major in Bioenvironmental Engineering. He is owner of the engineering firm of Polistina and Associates, L.L.C.

He lives in Egg Harbor Township, New Jersey, with his wife Carolyn and their three children.

== Elective office ==
After serving two terms in the New Jersey General Assembly, Polistina ran for the New Jersey Senate in the 2nd district in the 2011 election, losing to incumbent Democrat Jim Whelan in what was the state's most expensive race, with more than $3 million spent by both candidates. His Assembly seat was filled by Chris A. Brown.

Shortly after Chris A. Brown resigned from office on July 19, 2021, to join the New Jersey Department of Community Affairs, Republican Party chose Polistina to fill the vacant Senate seat, but he was not sworn into the Senate until November 8, 2021. In the 2021 New Jersey Senate election, Polistina was elected to fill the full term of office beginning in January 2022, defeating Democratic state Assemblyman Vince Mazzeo.

=== Committees ===
Committee assignments for the current session are:

- Labor
- State Government, Wagering, Tourism & Historic Preservation

=== District 2 ===
Each of the 40 districts in the New Jersey Legislature has one representative in the New Jersey Senate and two members in the New Jersey General Assembly. The representatives from the 2nd District for the 2024—25 Legislative Session are:

- Senator Vincent J. Polistina (R)
- Assemblyman Don Guardian (R)
- Assemblyman Claire Swift (R)

== Election history ==
2nd Legislative District General Election, 2023
Party	Candidate	Votes	%
Republican	Vince Polistina (incumbent)	24,516	52.2
Democratic	Caren Fitzpatrick	21,045	44.8
Libertarian	Shawn Peck	1,415	3.0
Total votes		46,976	100.0
Republican hold			

2nd Legislative District General Election, 2021
Party	Candidate	Votes	%
Republican	Vince Polistina	31,488	51.87
Democratic	Vince Mazzeo	29,213	48.13
Total votes		60,701	100.0
Republican hold			

New Jersey State Senate elections, 2011
Party	Candidate	Votes	%
Democratic	Jim Whelan (incumbent)	24,075	53.4
Republican	Vincent J. Polistina	20,997	46.6
Democratic hold			
