= Howard Kupperman =

American politician

Mayor of Longport
- In office 1983–1992

Member of the New Jersey General Assembly from the 2nd Legislative District
- In office January 13, 1976 – January 10, 1978
- Preceded by: Charles D. Worthington
- Succeeded by: William Gormley; Michael J. Matthews

Personal details
- Born: April 9, 1931 Atlantic City, New Jersey, U.S.
- Died: February 4, 2014 (aged 82) Tarpon Springs, Florida, U.S.
- Party: Republican

Howard Kupperman (April 9, 1931 – February 4, 2014) was an American politician who served in the New Jersey General Assembly from the 2nd Legislative District from 1976 to 1978 and as the Mayor of Longport from 1983 to 1992.

He died on February 4, 2014, in Tarpon Springs, Florida at age 82.
