= J. Edward Kline =

American politician (b. 1947)

Member of the New Jersey General Assembly from the 2nd Legislative District
- In office January 10, 1984 – January 14, 1992 Serving with Dolores G. Cooper
- Preceded by: Michael J. Matthews
- Succeeded by: Fred Scerni

Personal details
- Born: July 29, 1947 (age 79) Atlantic City, New Jersey, U.S.
- Party: Republican

J. Edward Kline (born July 29, 1947) is an American politician who served in the New Jersey General Assembly from the 2nd Legislative District from 1984 to 1992.
