= Charles D. Worthington =

American politician

1st Atlantic County Executive
- In office November 1975 – 1979
- Succeeded by: Richard Squires

Member of the New Jersey General Assembly from the 2nd district
- In office January 8, 1974 – December 31, 1975
- Preceded by: District created
- Succeeded by: Howard Kupperman

Personal details
- Born: April 12, 1928 Philadelphia, Pennsylvania, U.S.
- Died: December 31, 1999 (aged 71) Brigantine, New Jersey, U.S.
- Party: Democratic
- Spouse: Peggy
- Children: 4
- Education: West Chester State Teachers College; Rutgers University

Charles D. Worthington (April 12, 1928 – December 31, 1999) was an American politician from the state of New Jersey. He served one term in the New Jersey General Assembly from the 2nd Legislative District from 1974 to 1975. He also became the first County Executive of Atlantic County in November 1975, briefly serving in both positions at the same time. Worthington won his reelection bid for County Executive in 1979.

Worthington was born in Philadelphia in 1928. He received a bachelor's degree from West Chester State College and a master's degree from Rutgers University. He worked as a high school English teacher and a guidance counselor at Pleasantville High School.

Worthington and his wife, Peggy, had four children. He died from liver cancer at his home in Brigantine, New Jersey, on December 31, 1999, at the age of 71.
