= Frederick P. Nickles =

American politician

Member of the New Jersey General Assembly from the 2nd Legislative District
- In office January 14, 1992 – January 11, 1994 Serving with John F. Gaffney
- Preceded by: Dolores G. Cooper; Fred Scerni
- Succeeded by: Tom Foley

Personal details
- Born: February 10, 1948 Egg Harbor Township, New Jersey, U.S.
- Died: June 17, 2017 (aged 69) Egg Harbor Township, New Jersey, U.S.
- Resting place: Palestine Cemetery, Scullville Bible Church
- Party: Republican

Frederick P. Nickles (February 10, 1948 – June 17, 2017) was an American politician who served in the New Jersey General Assembly from the 2nd Legislative District from 1992 to 1994.

He died on June 17, 2017, in Egg Harbor Township, New Jersey at age 69.
