= Jim Whelan =

American politician

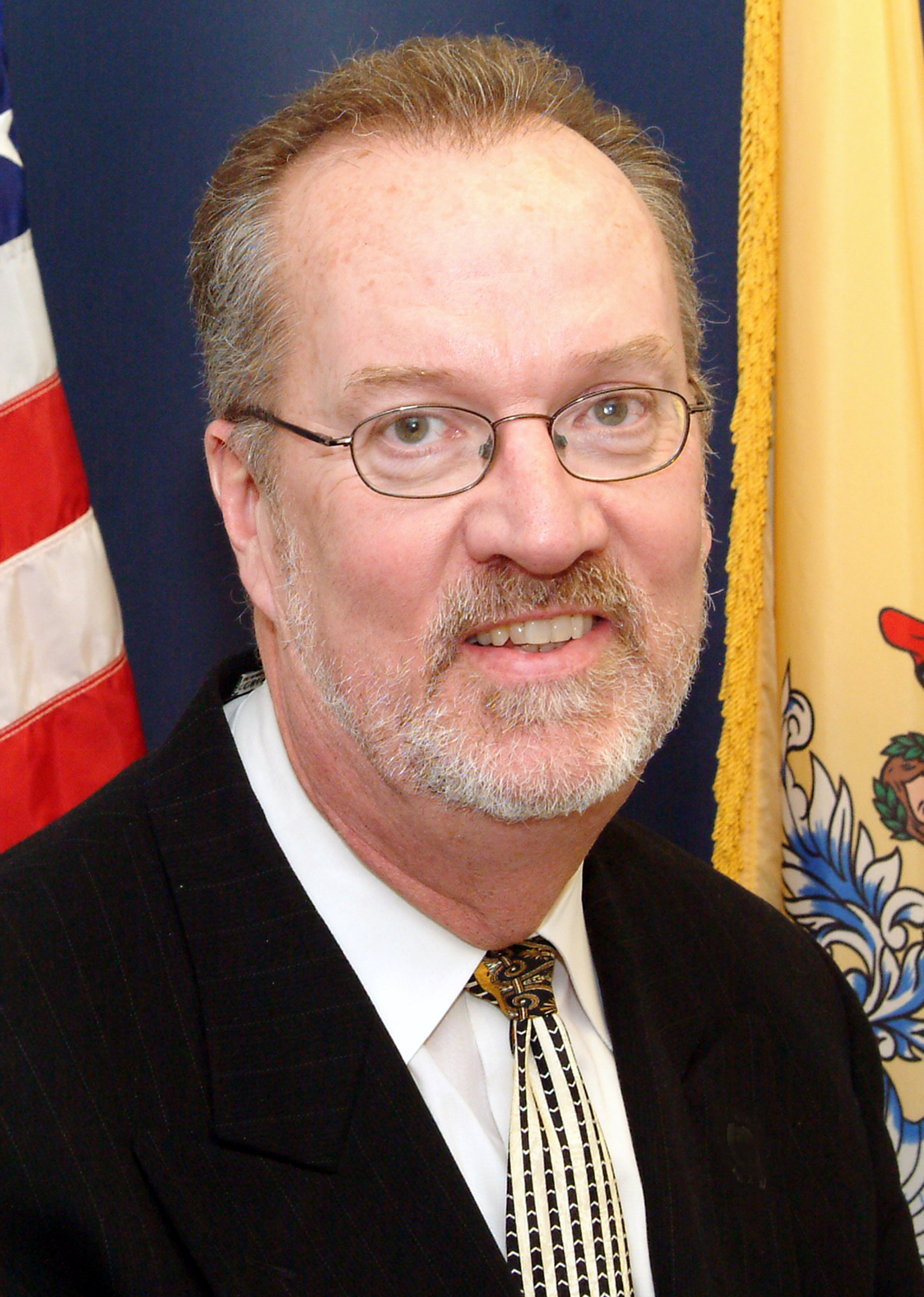
- Official portrait, 2006

Member of the New Jersey Senate from the 2nd district
- In office January 8, 2008 – August 22, 2017
- Preceded by: James J. McCullough
- Succeeded by: Colin Bell

Member of the New Jersey General Assembly from the 2nd district
- In office January 10, 2006 – January 8, 2008 Serving with Francis J. Blee
- Preceded by: Kirk W. Conover
- Succeeded by: John F. Amodeo; Vincent J. Polistina

Mayor of Atlantic City
- In office January 1, 1990 – December 31, 2001
- Preceded by: James L. Usry
- Succeeded by: Lorenzo Langford

Member of the Atlantic City Council
- In office January 1, 1982 – December 31, 1989

Personal details
- Born: November 8, 1948 Philadelphia, Pennsylvania, U.S.
- Died: August 22, 2017 (aged 68) Atlantic City, New Jersey, U.S.
- Party: Democratic
- Spouse: Kathy Whelan
- Education: B.A. Temple University (English Education); M.Ed. Temple University
- Occupation: Politician, Teacher
- Website: Legislative web page

James "Jim" Whelan (November 8, 1948 – August 22, 2017) was an American Democratic Party politician, who served in the New Jersey State Senate where he represented the 2nd Legislative District, from January 8, 2008, until his death.

== Early life ==
Whelan was born in Philadelphia, Pennsylvania and attended Temple University where he became a nationally ranked distance swimmer before a broken leg in his senior year cut short his career. His achievements, however, ultimately led to his induction in the Temple University Athletic Hall of Fame in 1995. He received a M.Ed. from Temple University.

== Political career ==
In 1977, Whelan took a job in the Atlantic City School District. During this time—on a volunteer basis—he helped coach the Atlantic City High School swim team. In 1978, to draw publicity for a bid to restore the Around the Island Swim (a 22.5 mile open-water swimming race around Absecon Island), Whelan did the race solo.

Four years later, he made his first foray into politics, making an unsuccessful run for the Atlantic County Board of Chosen Freeholders in 1980. The following year, he won election to the Atlantic City Council, in 1981, and was re-elected in 1985. He won the mayor's office in a landslide in 1989. Whelan served three terms as Mayor of Atlantic City.

Whelan was elected president of the New Jersey Conference of Mayors.

Following a defeat at the hands of Lorenzo T. Langford in 2001, Whelan returned to teaching. He also served on the board of the Atlantic City Convention and Visitors Authority.

Whelan was elected to the Assembly in November 2005, unseating Republican Kirk W. Conover, who had held the seat since 2003 in this Republican-leaning district.

In 2007, Whelan won his bid for a seat in the New Jersey Senate, defeating Republican Party incumbent James J. McCullough.

Whelan won re-election in November 2011, defeating Assemblyman Vincent J. Polistina in the state's most expensive race, with more than $3 million spent by both candidates. In the 2013 election, Whelan defeated Atlantic County Sheriff Frank X. Balles 55%–45%.

Whelan served in the Senate on the State Government, Wagering, Tourism & Historic Preservation Committee (as chair); the Health, Human Services and Senior Citizens Committee; and the Economic Growth Committee.

On January 4, 2017, Whelan announced that he was planning to retire as senator.

=== District 2 ===
Each of the 40 legislative districts in the New Jersey Legislature has one senator and two members of the New Jersey General Assembly. The other representatives from the 2nd Legislative District for the 2016-2017 (217th) Legislative Session are:

- Assemblyman Chris A. Brown (R)
- Assemblyman Vince Mazzeo (D)

=== Electoral history ===
New Jersey State Senate elections, 2013
Party	Candidate	Votes	%
Democratic	Jim Whelan (incumbent)	29,333	55.0%
Republican	Frank X. Balles	24,006	45.0%
Democratic hold			

New Jersey State Senate elections, 2011
Party	Candidate	Votes	%
Democratic	Jim Whelan (incumbent)	24,075	53.4%
Republican	Vincent J. Polistina	20,997	46.6%
Democratic hold			

New Jersey State Senate elections, 2007
Party	Candidate	Votes	%
Democratic	Jim Whelan	27,913	57.1%
Republican	James J. McCullough (incumbent)	21,003	42.9%
Democratic gain from Republican			

== Death ==
Whelan died on August 22, 2017, at age 68 from a heart attack at his home in Atlantic City. Whelan was survived by his wife Kathy Whelan and his son Richard Whelan, who successfully pushed to get Atlantic City's Boardwalk Hall officially dedicated to his memory.

New Jersey Senate
Preceded by James J. McCullough	Member of the New Jersey Senate from the 2nd district January 8, 2008 – August 22, 2017	Succeeded by Colin Bell
New Jersey General Assembly
Preceded by Kirk W. Conover	Member of the New Jersey Assembly from the 2nd district January 10, 2006 – January 8, 2008; Served alongside: Francis J. Blee	Succeeded by John F. Amodeo; Vincent J. Polistina
Political offices
Preceded by James L. Usry	Mayor of Atlantic City; 1990–2001	Succeeded by Lorenzo T. Langford
