= Joseph Lazarow =

American politician (1923–2008)

Joseph Aaron Lazarow (December 17, 1923 – January 3, 2008) was an American politician from New Jersey, who served as the Mayor of Atlantic City, New Jersey from 1976 to 1982, during the period when casino gambling was introduced to the struggling Jersey Shore community.

== Biography ==
Lazarow was born in Atlantic City in 1923 to Eva and Morris Lazarow, and graduated from Atlantic City High School. His attendance at Rutgers University-New Brunswick was cut short by his enlistment in the United States Army, where he served from 1942 to 1945 as a private. After his discharge, he returned to Rutgers and ultimately moved on to Temple University, where he completed both his undergraduate and law degrees.

He had been elected to the City Commission in 1972, and was selected by his peers to serve as mayor in 1976. As mayor, Lazarow was named chairman of the Committee to Rebuild Atlantic City, a group developed to support the passage of the 1976 statewide referendum that approved gambling in New Jersey. He unsuccessfully opposed construction of casinos on the city's four-mile (6 km) long Boardwalk, citing concerns that the area's residents, advocating that the hotels should be cited in unused wetlands on the city's outskirts. Lazarow worked with New Jersey's governor and other state officials to obtain aid to construct low-cost housing for the poor and elderly displaced by construction projects. An effort by Lazarow to restrict casino jobs to Atlantic City residents was similarly unsuccessful.

With Lazarow on hand, Resorts International Hotel and Casino opened on May 26, 1978, the first legalized gambling casino on the East Coast of the United States and the first outside Nevada.

Lazarow was recognized by the Guinness Book of World Records for a July 1977 publicity stunt, in which the mayor shook more than 11,000 hands in a single day, breaking the record previously held by Theodore Roosevelt, who had set the record with 8,513 handshakes at a White House reception on January 1, 1907.

He had lived in the city's Lower Chelsea section since the mid-1950s, until the 1993 death of his wife, the former Fredlyn Pogach of Philadelphia. Lazarow moved to Fort Lauderdale, Florida in 1995. He died in St. Petersburg, Florida on January 3, 2008 at the age of 84.

== See also ==
- List of mayors of Atlantic City, New Jersey

Political offices
Preceded by Joseph Bradway, Jr.	Mayor of Atlantic City; 1976–1982	Succeeded by Michael J. Matthews
