= Frank S. Farley =

American politician

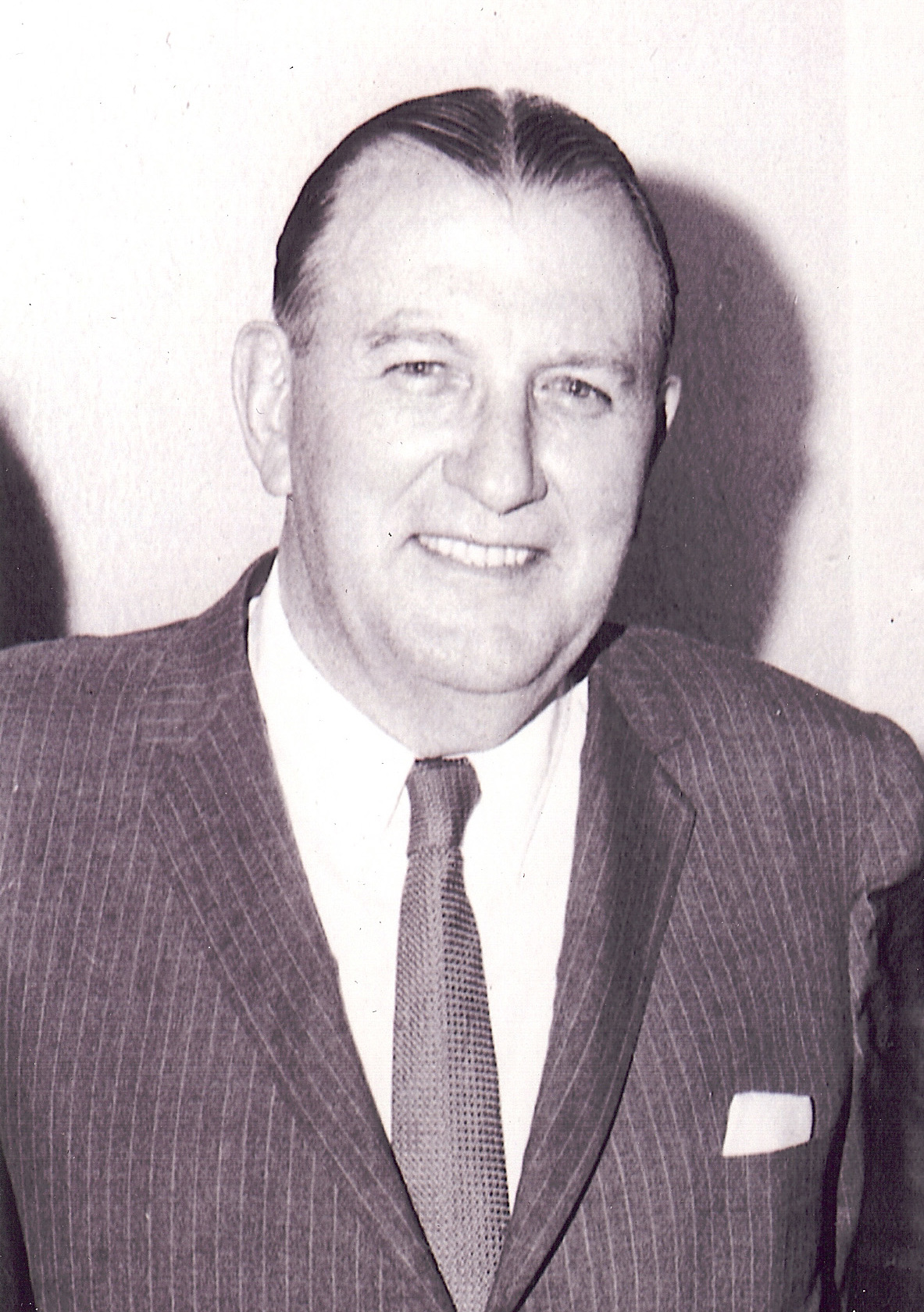
- Farley c. 1970

President of the New Jersey Senate
- In office 1945
- Preceded by: George H. Stanger
- Succeeded by: Haydn Proctor
- In office 1962
- Preceded by: Robert C. Crane
- Succeeded by: William E. Ozzard

Member of the New Jersey Senate
- In office 1941 – January 11, 1972
- Preceded by: Thomas D. Taggart, Jr.
- Succeeded by: Joseph McGahn
- Constituency: Atlantic County (1941–66); 1st district (1966–68); 2nd district (1968–72)

Member of the New Jersey General Assembly from the Atlantic County district
- In office 1938–1941

Personal details
- Born: December 5, 1901 Atlantic City, New Jersey, U.S.
- Died: September 24, 1977 (aged 75) Ventnor City, New Jersey, U.S.
- Party: Republican
- Spouse: Marie Fey
- Education: Georgetown University
- Profession: Lawyer

Francis Sherman "Hap" Farley (December 5, 1901 – September 24, 1977) was a New Jersey State Senator from Atlantic County, New Jersey, described by The New York Times in 1977 as "probably the most powerful legislator in New Jersey history". He served for what was then a record 34 years in the New Jersey Legislature and was throughout that period the political leader of the Republican political machine that controlled the Atlantic City, New Jersey, and Atlantic County governments.

== Biography ==
Farley was born December 5, 1901, in Atlantic City, the youngest of ten children born to James and Maria (Clowney) Farley. As a youth, teammates gave him the nickname "Happy", which was shortened to "Hap" as he got older. He attended the St. Nicholas of Tolentine grammar school before advancing to Atlantic City High School where he met his future wife, Marie "Honey" Feyl. In high school, Farley was an accomplished baseball, football, and basketball player. He was expelled from Atlantic City High School in 1920 after playing at the YMCA with teammates against a team of African American college students who were barred from playing on their collegiate teams. Atlantic City High School had a strict policy that no varsity players could play in any other league or competition. For his senior year, Farley attended the Wenonah Military Academy which recruited him for his athletic accomplishments. He went on to attend the University of Pennsylvania, before graduating from Georgetown Law School in 1925. After his education was complete, he married Marie Feyl and began practicing law in Atlantic City.

=== In the legislature ===
In 1937, Farley was elected to represent Atlantic County in the New Jersey Assembly, and in 1940 he was elected to the New Jersey Senate. In 1941, Enoch "Nucky" Johnson, boss of the Atlantic City/Atlantic County Republican political machine, was convicted of income tax evasion and sent to prison. Farley, after a struggle with rival Thomas D. Taggart, Jr., mayor of Atlantic City, succeeded Johnson as the leader of the organization.

Farley's first move as a crime boss was to separate the organization's political aspect from its criminal one. He appointed Jimmy Boyd, Nucky Johnson's former right-hand man and enforcer, as the overseer of all organized crime operations in Atlantic City. Unlike the two previous bosses of the organization, Farley was noted for fighting to distance himself from the American Mafia.

Farley rose through the leadership ranks of the State Senate to become Senate majority leader in January, 1944. By early 1945 he was Senate President. At different times during his tenure as state senator, Farley was chairman of all of the major Senate committees. He was also president of the Jersey Senate 21 Club, which was composed of all twenty-one New Jersey senators, Republican and Democrat, from 1941 to 1965. For many years, Senator Farley hosted "Senate at the Shore": a retreat for the senators and their wives in Atlantic City where Republicans and Democrats could share in relationship-building events. Farley was chairman of the Atlantic County Republican Committee from 1941 to 1972 and treasurer of Atlantic County from 1944 to 1971. He also re-instituted the New Jersey Republican Chairmen's Association and was elected president of that body from 1952 to 1972. Farley was Senate president pro tem in 1946, 1963, 1964, 1965, and 1968. Senator Farley was acting Governor of New Jersey on many occasions, serving for various governors. He was a delegate to the New Jersey Constitutional Convention in 1947 and 1966.

Farley was endeared by his constituents for accomplishing legislation that brought the Atlantic City State Marina in 1941 (renamed the Senator Frank S. Farley State Marina in 1971), sanctioned horse racing and parimutuel betting to the state which brought about the Atlantic City Race Course in 1944, the Fishing Conservation Commission in 1946 which aided in coastal jetty protection, the Garden State Parkway in 1952 (which was referred to by North Jersey legislators as "Farley's Folly"), the Atlantic City Expressway in 1964 (the service plaza, Farley Service Plaza, of which is now named in his honor), Stockton State College in 1963, numerous county community colleges, the State Aeronautical Space College, the National Aviation Facilities Experimental Center, the Cape May Lewes Ferry in 1965, the Police and Firemen's Widow Pension in 1965, the expansion of the New Jersey Medical School, and educational TV station WHYY in 1967. By 1960, he held the record of having had more bills passed than any other member of the upper house. Farley believed that his political success lay primarily in persuading other legislators "not to hurt us if you can't help us", and in treating other legislators the same way.

Senator Farley's efforts also reached those most in need in Atlantic County. His bills brought free vaccines to needy children in 1955, established the New Jersey Division against Discrimination in Education in 1960, produced the Atlantic County Improvement Authority, brought about tax deductions for veterans and senior citizens, and established a senior citizen nonprofit housing tax exemption in 1965, Farley's urban renewal bill, passed in 1949, and the state Mosquito Control and Inland Waterway commissions aimed to improve the quality of life for his constituents, particularly.

The pristine beaches and world famous boardwalk are two of Atlantic City's main attractions. However, storms often destroy and erode sections of both. To counter this, Senator Farley put forward a permanent annual appropriation for the resort beaches. 75 percent of this was provided by the state and 25 percent was provided by Atlantic City. After a particularly devastating storm in 1944, Senator Farley proposed a beneficial city Luxury Tax. The measure taxed hotels, tobacco, liquor, and amusements in Atlantic City. The funds of this tax directly replenished the beach erosion, fortified the boardwalk, and supplied other infrastructural improvements for the city. In 1949, the New Jersey State Beach Erosion Commission became the authority for upkeep; however, in 1962, Senator Farley acquired $5 million from the state to restore the Atlantic City beaches. The city luxury tax still provides funds for the improvement of Atlantic City, and in 2019, the New Jersey Division of Gaming Enforcement reported $32,425,000 in luxury tax revenue for the city.

When Farley entered the New Jersey Senate, each of the state's twenty-one counties was represented by one senator. This resulted in the smaller counties, which included most South Jersey counties, having an equal amount of power in the senate. Still, Farley was very effective in assembling a majority of the twenty-one senators to support his proposals. Farley's legislative power was ultimately diluted as a result of the United States Supreme Court's 1962 decision in Baker v. Carr, which required that representation in state legislatures be based on population, not counties. As a result, the size of the state senate grew to forty members, with most of the new seats representing districts in North Jersey, and it was much more difficult for Farley to advocate for Atlantic County and southern New Jersey.

While Farley served as a delegate to the Republican National Convention, he was instrumental in getting the New Jersey delegation at the 1968 Republican National Convention to switch their support from favorite son Clifford P. Case to Richard Nixon.

In the latter part of Farley's legislative career, a growing number of Atlantic City activists and leaders proposed the legalization of casino gambling as a way to rebuild the deteriorated city and rejuvenate its declining economy. Until near the end of his senatorial career, Farley refused to back casino gambling, a position that some close to him attributed to a desire to avoid the scrutiny that gambling would bring. During his final year as state senator, however, Farley did attempt to enact legislation to authorize a referendum that would legalize gambling in Atlantic City. The proposed legislation, which was officially sponsored by Farley's political ally Senator Frank X. McDermott (R-Union) because Farley feared a backlash if he publicly appeared to support it, lacked safeguards and was soundly defeated in the Senate.

=== After leaving the legislature ===
In 1971, Farley was defeated in his attempt for reelection by Dr. Joseph McGahn, the Democratic candidate.

In the early 1970s, after Farley left office, the Federal Aviation Administration planned to close the National Aviation Facilities Experimental Center (now known as the William J. Hughes Technical Center) located in the Pomona section of Galloway Township, which was, and still is, one of the largest employers in Atlantic County. Farley, at the request of community leaders, intervened in the fate of the center again by going to administration officials in Washington, ensuring the facility was not closed.

In 1974, supporters of legalized casino gambling in Atlantic City succeeded in having a referendum placed on the New Jersey general election ballot that would have permitted casino gambling throughout the state. After the proposal was soundly defeated by voters, some criticized the failure of proponents of the measure to involve Farley in the effort, and Farley also expressed disappointment in not having been involved.

After their defeat in 1974, supporters of gambling regrouped under the continued direction of Meyer I. (Mike) Segal, who had served as Chairman of the Committee to Legalize Gambling and the new direction of Mayor Joseph Lazarow, who served as chairman for the Committee to Rebuild Atlantic City—another pro-gambling organization. The gambling proponents were successful in placing another referendum on the November 1976 ballot that would permit casino gambling in only Atlantic City. This time, casino proponents were much better organized than they had been in 1974, and Segal sought the assistance of Senator Farley, who worked extensively behind the scenes to make gambling a reality for Atlantic City. Farley successfully urged old political allies in other parts of the state to support the measure, including Bergen County Sheriff Joseph Job, and some observers estimated that these efforts resulted in hundreds of thousands of votes in favor of casinos. This time the referendum was approved by a wide margin. Sanford Weiner, the campaign strategist hired by the pro-casino organization, the Committee to Rebuild Atlantic City, considered obtaining Joseph Job's support for the measure to be the decisive factor in securing the victory.

Farley died on September 24, 1977, at his home in Ventnor City, New Jersey. More than 7,000 letters and gifts were delivered to his home from constituents, peers, admirers, and others. Among those delivered to the Farley residence were personal notes from President Richard Nixon, Gerald R. Ford, governors, senators, and assemblymen. The New York Times described Farley as "probably the most powerful legislator in New Jersey history" further noting that he was "an artful negotiator whose backroom wheeling and dealing were legendary", and that he "was credited with pushing through more special legislation for his district, Atlantic City and Atlantic County, than any other legislator".

Political offices
Preceded by George H. Stanger	President of the New Jersey Senate; 1945	Succeeded by Haydn Proctor
Preceded by Robert C. Crane	President of the New Jersey Senate; 1962	Succeeded by William E. Ozzard
