= New Jersey's 2nd legislative district =

American legislative district

- Senator: Vincent J. Polistina (R)
- Assembly members: Don Guardian (R); Maureen Rowan (D)
- Registration: 35.40% Democratic; 28.43% Republican; 34.91% unaffiliated
- Demographics: 54.1% White; 16.8% Black/African American; 0.5% Native American; 8.2% Asian; 0.1% Hawaiian/Pacific Islander; 10.8% Other race; 9.5% Two or more races; 20.8% Hispanic
- Population: 216,156
- Voting-age population: 170,802
- Registered voters: 171,742

New Jersey's 2nd legislative district is one of 40 in the state, covering the Atlantic County municipalities of Absecon, Atlantic City, Brigantine, Egg Harbor Township, Galloway Township, Hamilton Township, Linwood, Longport, Margate City, Northfield, Pleasantville, Port Republic, Somers Point and Ventnor City as of the 2021 apportionment. Since 1967, the 2nd District has been exclusively made up of municipalities from Atlantic County, except for an eight-year period from 1974 until 1982.

== Demographic characteristics ==
As of the 2020 United States census, the district had a population of 216,156, of whom 170,802 (79.0%) were of voting age. The racial makeup of the district was 116,893 (54.1%) White, 36,312 (16.8%) African American, 1,051 (0.5%) Native American, 17,740 (8.2%) Asian, 320 (0.1%) Pacific Islander, 23,314 (10.8%) from other races, and 20,526 (9.5%) from two or more races. Hispanic or Latino of any race were 44,899 (20.8%) of the population.

The district had 165,449 registered voters as of December 1, 2021, of whom 58,399 (35.3%) were registered as unaffiliated, 61,149 (37.0%) were registered as Democrats, 43,534 (26.3%) were registered as Republicans, and 2,367 (1.4%) were registered to other parties.

== Political representation ==
For the 2026–2027 session, the 2nd legislative district of the New Jersey Legislature is represented in the New Jersey Senate by Vincent J. Polistina (R, Egg Harbor Township) and in the General Assembly by Don Guardian (R, Atlantic City) and Maureen Rowan (D, Atlantic City).

It is entirely located within New Jersey's 2nd congressional district.

== 1965–1973 ==
During the period of time after the 1964 Supreme Court decision in Reynolds v. Sims and before the establishment of a 40-district legislature in 1973, the 2nd District was based around Atlantic County except for the 1965 Senate elections. In that election, the 2nd District encompassed all of Salem and Cumberland counties with the election being won by Democrat John A. Waddington.

In the following sessions, the Senate seat (one Senator elected in each election) and Assembly seats (two people elected per election) encompassed all of Atlantic County. Republican Frank S. Farley won the 1967 Senate election but was defeated by Democrat Joseph McGahn in 1971. Republicans Albert S. Smith and Samuel A. Curcio won the 1967 and 1969 Assembly elections but Democrats Steven P. Perskie and James A. Colasurdo won the 1971 election.

== District composition since 1973 ==
Upon the creation of the 40 equal-population districts for the State Legislature in 1973, the 2nd District encompassed all of Atlantic County plus Burlington County townships Washington and Bass River and Ocean County's Little Egg Harbor Township and Tuckerton. For the 1980s 2nd District, the Burlington and Ocean County municipalities were removed as were Buena, Buena Vista Township, and Folsom. The 1990s version of the district was made further compact by shifting Hammonton and Egg Harbor City to other districts. In the 2001 redistricting, Egg Harbor City returned to the 2nd but Somers Point shifted to the 1st District.

The 2011 apportionment added Buena (from District 1), Buena Vista Township (1st District), Folsom (9th District) and Somers Point (1st District). Municipalities that had been in the 2nd District as part of the 2001 apportionment that were shifted out of the district are Corbin City (to 1st District), Estell Manor (1st District), Galloway Township (9th District), Port Republic (9th District) and Weymouth Township (1st District). Under the 2021 apportionment, Buena, Buena Vista Township, Egg Harbor City, Folsom, and Mullica Township were removed while Galloway Township and Port Republic were added from the 9th district.

== Election history ==
| Session | Senate | General Assembly | |
|---|---|---|---|
| 1974–1975 | Joseph McGahn (D) | Steven P. Perskie (D) | Charles D. Worthington (D) |
| 1976–1977 | Joseph McGahn (D) | Steven P. Perskie (D) | Howard Kupperman (R) |
| 1978–1979 | Steven P. Perskie (D) | Michael J. Matthews (D) | William Gormley (R) |
| 1980–1981 | Steven P. Perskie (D) | Michael J. Matthews (D) | William Gormley (R) |
| 1982–1983 | Steven P. Perskie (D) (Note: Resigned June 28, 1982 to become a Superior Court judge) | Michael J. Matthews (D) | William Gormley (R) (Note: Elected to the Senate in a September 7, 1982 special election and seated on September 16, 1982) |
| 1982–1983 | William Gormley (R) | Michael J. Matthews (D) | Dolores G. Cooper (R) (Note: Elected in a special election on November 2, 1982) |
| 1984–1985 | William Gormley (R) | J. Edward Kline (R) | Dolores G. Cooper (R) |
| 1986–1987 | William Gormley (R) | J. Edward Kline (R) | Dolores G. Cooper (R) |
| 1988–1989 | William Gormley (R) | J. Edward Kline (R) | Dolores G. Cooper (R) |
| 1990–1991 | William Gormley (R) | Fred Scerni (D) | Dolores G. Cooper (R) |
| 1992–1993 | William Gormley (R) | John F. Gaffney (R) | Frederick P. Nickles (R) |
| 1994–1995 | William Gormley (R) | John F. Gaffney (R) (Note: Died August 27, 1995) | Tom Foley (D) |
| 1994–1995 | William Gormley (R) | Francis J. Blee (R) (Note: Appointed September 18, 1995) | Tom Foley (D) |
| 1996–1997 | William Gormley (R) | Francis J. Blee (R) | Kenneth LeFevre (R) |
| 1998–1999 | William Gormley (R) | Francis J. Blee (R) | Kenneth LeFevre (R) |
| 2000–2001 | William Gormley (R) | Francis J. Blee (R) | Kenneth LeFevre (R) |
| 2002–2003 | William Gormley (R) | Francis J. Blee (R) | Paul R. D'Amato (R) (Note: Resigned May 16, 2003) |
| 2002–2003 | William Gormley (R) | Francis J. Blee (R) | Kirk W. Conover (R) (Note: Appointed May 22, 2003) |
| 2004–2005 | William Gormley (R) (Note: Resigned February 15, 2007) | Francis J. Blee (R) | Kirk W. Conover (R) |
| 2006–2007 | William Gormley (R) | Francis J. Blee (R) | Jim Whelan (D) |
| 2006–2007 | James J. McCullough (R) (Note: Appointed February 22, 2007) | Francis J. Blee (R) | Jim Whelan (D) |
| 2008–2009 | Jim Whelan (D) | John F. Amodeo (R) | Vincent J. Polistina (R) |
| 2010–2011 | Jim Whelan (D) | John F. Amodeo (R) | Vincent J. Polistina (R) |
| 2012–2013 | Jim Whelan (D) | John F. Amodeo (R) | Chris A. Brown (R) |
| 2014–2015 | Jim Whelan (D) (Note: Died August 22, 2017) | Vince Mazzeo (D) | Chris A. Brown (R) |
| 2016–2017 | Jim Whelan (D) | Vince Mazzeo (D) | Chris A. Brown (R) |
| 2016–2017 | Colin Bell (D) (Note: Appointed October 5, 2017) | Vince Mazzeo (D) | Chris A. Brown (R) |
| 2018–2019 | Chris A. Brown (R) (Note: Resigned July 19, 2021 to join the Department of Community Affairs) | Vince Mazzeo (D) | John Armato (D) |
| 2020–2021 | Chris A. Brown (R) | Vince Mazzeo (D) | John Armato (D) |
| 2020–2021 | Vincent J. Polistina (R) (Note: Appointed November 8, 2021) | Vince Mazzeo (D) | John Armato (D) |
| 2022–2023 | Vincent J. Polistina (R) | Don Guardian (R) | Claire Swift (R) |
| 2024–2025 | Vincent J. Polistina (R) | Don Guardian (R) | Claire Swift (R) |
| 2026–2027 | Vincent J. Polistina (R) | Don Guardian (R) | Maureen Rowan (D) |

== Election results, 1973–present ==
=== Senate ===
2021 New Jersey general election
| Party | Candidate | Votes | % | ±% |
|---|---|---|---|---|
| Republican | Vince Polistina | 31,488 | 51.9 | ▼1.6 |
| Democratic | Vince Mazzeo | 29,213 | 48.1 | ▲1.6 |
| Total votes | | 60,701 | 100.0 | |

New Jersey general election, 2017
| Party | Candidate | Votes | % | ±% |
|---|---|---|---|---|
| Republican | Chris Brown | 26,950 | 53.5 | ▲8.5 |
| Democratic | Colin Bell | 23,406 | 46.5 | ▼8.5 |
| Total votes | | 50,356 | 100.0 | |

New Jersey general election, 2013
| Party | Candidate | Votes | % | ±% |
|---|---|---|---|---|
| Democratic | Jim Whelan | 29,337 | 55.0 | ▲1.6 |
| Republican | Frank X. Balles | 24,008 | 45.0 | ▼1.6 |
| Total votes | | 53,345 | 100.0 | |

2011 New Jersey general election
| Party | Candidate | Votes | % |
|---|---|---|---|
| Democratic | Jim Whelan | 24,075 | 53.4 |
| Republican | Vince Polistina | 20,997 | 46.6 |
| Total votes | | 45,072 | 100.0 |

2007 New Jersey general election
| Party | Candidate | Votes | % | ±% |
|---|---|---|---|---|
| Democratic | James Whelan | 27,913 | 57.1 | ▲20.0 |
| Republican | James "Sonny" McCullough | 21,013 | 42.9 | ▼17.1 |
| Total votes | | 48,926 | 100.0 | |

2003 New Jersey general election
| Party | Candidate | Votes | % | ±% |
|---|---|---|---|---|
| Republican | William L. Gormley | 24,680 | 60.0 | ▼26.5 |
| Democratic | Tom Swift | 15,281 | 37.1 | N/A |
| Green | Robert "Gabe" Gabrielsky | 1,174 | 2.9 | ▼10.6 |
| Total votes | | 41,135 | 100.0 | |

2001 New Jersey general election
| Party | Candidate | Votes | % |
|---|---|---|---|
| Republican | William Gormley | 34,786 | 86.5 |
| Green | David Alcantara | 5,411 | 13.5 |
| Total votes | | 40,197 | 100.0 |

1997 New Jersey general election
| Party | Candidate | Votes | % | ±% |
|---|---|---|---|---|
| Republican | William L. Gormley | 34,814 | 65.2 | ▲3.6 |
| Democratic | John R. Piatt | 18,569 | 34.8 | ▼3.6 |
| Total votes | | 53,383 | 100.0 | |

1993 New Jersey general election
| Party | Candidate | Votes | % | ±% |
|---|---|---|---|---|
| Republican | William L. Gormley | 32,059 | 61.6 | ▲8.3 |
| Democratic | Mark Roody | 19,973 | 38.4 | ▼8.3 |
| Total votes | | 52,032 | 100.0 | |

1991 New Jersey general election
| Party | Candidate | Votes | % |
|---|---|---|---|
| Republican | William L. Gormley | 22,731 | 53.3 |
| Democratic | Meg Worthington | 19,908 | 46.7 |
| Total votes | | 42,639 | 100.0 |

1987 New Jersey general election
| Party | Candidate | Votes | % | ±% |
|---|---|---|---|---|
| Republican | William L. Gormley | 30,665 | 73.4 | ▲16.6 |
| Democratic | William J. Polistina | 11,119 | 26.6 | ▼14.4 |
| Total votes | | 41,784 | 100.0 | |

1983 New Jersey general election
| Party | Candidate | Votes | % | ±% |
|---|---|---|---|---|
| Republican | William L. Gormley | 27,616 | 56.8 | ▼15.5 |
| Democratic | Arlene Groch | 19,937 | 41.0 | ▲16.0 |
| Senate Independent | James T. Hagen | 1,062 | 2.2 | ▲1.3 |
| Total votes | | 48,615 | 100.0 | |

Special election, September 7, 1982
| Party | Candidate | Votes | % | ±% |
|---|---|---|---|---|
| Republican | William L. Gormley | 13,874 | 72.3 | ▲24.0 |
| Democratic | Howard J. Lynde, Jr. | 4,800 | 25.0 | ▼26.7 |
| Jobs-Equality-Business | Willie Norwood | 347 | 1.8 | N/A |
| Representative Independent | James T. Hagen | 177 | 0.9 | N/A |
| Total votes | | 19,198 | 100.0 | |

1981 New Jersey general election
| Party | Candidate | Votes | % |
|---|---|---|---|
| Democratic | Steven P. Perskie | 29,843 | 51.7 |
| Republican | Joseph L. McGahn | 27,890 | 48.3 |
| Total votes | | 57,733 | 100.0 |

1977 New Jersey general election
| Party | Candidate | Votes | % | ±% |
|---|---|---|---|---|
| Democratic | Steven P. Perskie | 31,712 | 47.9 | ▼7.2 |
| Republican | F. Frederick Perone | 20,160 | 30.5 | ▼14.4 |
| Re-Elect, Experience, Integrity | Joseph L. McGahn | 14,288 | 21.6 | ▼33.5 |
| Total votes | | 66,160 | 100.0 | |

1973 New Jersey general election
| Party | Candidate | Votes | % |
|---|---|---|---|
| Democratic | Joseph L. McGahn | 32,043 | 55.1 |
| Republican | Irving A. Lilienfeld | 26,120 | 44.9 |
| Total votes | | 58,163 | 100.0 |

=== General Assembly ===
2021 New Jersey general election
| Party | Candidate | Votes | % | ±% |
|---|---|---|---|---|
| Republican | Claire Swift | 31,818 | 26.8 | ▲2.7 |
| Republican | Don Guardian | 31,640 | 26.7 | ▲2.6 |
| Democratic | John Armato | 28,094 | 23.7 | ▼1.5 |
| Democratic | Caren Fitzpatrick | 27,127 | 22.9 | ▼3.8 |
| Total votes | | 118,679 | 100.0 | |

2019 New Jersey general election
| Party | Candidate | Votes | % | ±% |
|---|---|---|---|---|
| Democratic | Vincent Mazzeo | 23,211 | 26.7 | ▼1.9 |
| Democratic | John Armato | 21,892 | 25.2 | ▼1.4 |
| Republican | John W. Risley Jr. | 20,906 | 24.1 | ▲2.6 |
| Republican | Philip J. Guenther | 20,905 | 24.1 | ▲2.8 |
| Total votes | | 86,914 | 100.0 | |

New Jersey general election, 2017
| Party | Candidate | Votes | % | ±% |
|---|---|---|---|---|
| Democratic | Vince Mazzeo | 27,601 | 28.6 | ▲3.1 |
| Democratic | John Armato | 25,683 | 26.6 | ▲2.2 |
| Republican | Vince Sera | 20,814 | 21.5 | ▼5.0 |
| Republican | Brenda Taube | 20,611 | 21.3 | ▼2.3 |
| Independent, Honest, Reliable | Heather Gordon | 1,208 | 1.3 | N/A |
| Green | Mico Lucide | 718 | 0.7 | N/A |
| Total votes | | 96,635 | 100.0 | |

New Jersey general election, 2015
| Party | Candidate | Votes | % | ±% |
|---|---|---|---|---|
| Republican | Chris Brown | 18,959 | 26.5 | ▲0.9 |
| Democratic | Vincent Mazzeo | 18,279 | 25.5 | ▲0.7 |
| Democratic | Colin Bell | 17,433 | 24.4 | ▲0.9 |
| Republican | Will Pauls | 16,907 | 23.6 | ▼1.1 |
| Total votes | | 71,578 | 100.0 | |

New Jersey general election, 2013
| Party | Candidate | Votes | % | ±% |
|---|---|---|---|---|
| Republican | Chris Brown | 26,022 | 25.6 | ▼1.5 |
| Democratic | Vincent Mazzeo | 25,182 | 24.77 | ▲1.8 |
| Republican | John F. Amodeo | 25,131 | 24.72 | ▼4.5 |
| Democratic | Nick Russo | 23,921 | 23.5 | ▲2.8 |
| Brownie Plus Me | Gary Stein | 1,394 | 1.4 | N/A |
| Total votes | | 101,650 | 100.0 | |

New Jersey general election, 2011
| Party | Candidate | Votes | % |
|---|---|---|---|
| Republican | John F. Amodeo | 25,330 | 29.2 |
| Republican | Chris Brown | 23,440 | 27.1 |
| Democratic | Damon Tyner | 19,919 | 23.0 |
| Democratic | Alisa Cooper | 17,933 | 20.7 |
| Total votes | | 86,622 | 100.0 |

New Jersey general election, 2009
| Party | Candidate | Votes | % | ±% |
|---|---|---|---|---|
| Republican | John F. Amodeo | 33,787 | 30.3 | ▲2.0 |
| Republican | Vincent J. Polistina | 32,981 | 29.6 | ▲2.0 |
| Democratic | Jimmy Martinez | 22,430 | 20.1 | ▼3.3 |
| Democratic | Reginald Floyd | 22,316 | 20.0 | ▼0.8 |
| Total votes | | 111,514 | 100.0 | |

New Jersey general election, 2007
| Party | Candidate | Votes | % | ±% |
|---|---|---|---|---|
| Republican | John F. Amodeo | 26,214 | 28.3 | ▲2.6 |
| Republican | Vince Polistina | 25,603 | 27.6 | ▲6.6 |
| Democratic | Joe Wilkins | 21,699 | 23.4 | ▼4.2 |
| Democratic | Blondell K. Spellman | 19,260 | 20.8 | ▼3.4 |
| Total votes | | 92,776 | 100.0 | |

New Jersey general election, 2005
| Party | Candidate | Votes | % | ±% |
|---|---|---|---|---|
| Democratic | Jim Whelan | 29,906 | 27.6 | ▲9.8 |
| Republican | Frank Blee | 27,846 | 25.7 | ▼5.3 |
| Democratic | Damon Tyner | 26,264 | 24.2 | ▲6.8 |
| Republican | Kirk W. Conover | 22,795 | 21.0 | ▼8.1 |
| Socialist | Sharon Chiorazzo | 832 | 0.8 | N/A |
| Socialist | Willie Norwood | 665 | 0.6 | N/A |
| Total votes | | 108,308 | 100.0 | |

New Jersey general election, 2003
| Party | Candidate | Votes | % | ±% |
|---|---|---|---|---|
| Republican | Frank Blee | 24,787 | 31.0 | ▲3.3 |
| Republican | Kirk Conover | 23,259 | 29.1 | ▲1.0 |
| Democratic | Stephen P. Swift | 14,277 | 17.8 | ▼4.0 |
| Democratic | Alisa Cooper | 13,945 | 17.4 | ▼4.2 |
| Green | Meredith Slotoroff | 1,579 | 2.0 | ▲1.1 |
| Green | Ray Higbee Jr | 1,488 | 1.9 | N/A |
| People's People | Joseph T. Hicks | 700 | 0.9 | N/A |
| Total votes | | 80,035 | 100.0 | |

New Jersey general election, 2001
| Party | Candidate | Votes | % |
|---|---|---|---|
| Republican | Paul R. D'Amato | 29,427 | 28.1 |
| Republican | Frank Blee | 29,010 | 27.7 |
| Democratic | Fred Scerni | 22,833 | 21.8 |
| Democratic | Dianna W. Fauntleroy | 22,597 | 21.6 |
| Green | Robert Paul Gabrielsky | 941 | 0.9 |
| Total votes | | 104,808 | 100.0 |

New Jersey general election, 1999
| Party | Candidate | Votes | % | ±% |
|---|---|---|---|---|
| Republican | Kenneth C. LeFevre | 23,414 | 32.8 | ▲0.6 |
| Republican | Francis J. Blee | 22,897 | 32.0 | ▲0.5 |
| Democratic | John Piatt | 12,797 | 17.9 | ▼0.5 |
| Democratic | Milton Berkes | 12,378 | 17.3 | ▼0.6 |
| Total votes | | 71,486 | 100.0 | |

New Jersey general election, 1997
| Party | Candidate | Votes | % | ±% |
|---|---|---|---|---|
| Republican | Kenneth C. Le Fevre | 33,430 | 32.2 | ▲3.7 |
| Republican | Frank Blee | 32,698 | 31.5 | ▲4.3 |
| Democratic | John Di Maria | 19,132 | 18.4 | ▼4.9 |
| Democratic | E. Iris Hernandez | 18,651 | 17.9 | ▼1.7 |
| Total votes | | 103,911 | 100.0 | |

New Jersey general election, 1995
| Party | Candidate | Votes | % | ±% |
|---|---|---|---|---|
| Republican | Kenneth C. LeFevre | 22,072 | 28.5 | ▲2.1 |
| Republican | Frank Blee | 21,070 | 27.2 | ▲1.6 |
| Democratic | Tom Foley | 18,010 | 23.3 | ▼2.7 |
| Democratic | Barbara Hudgins | 15,155 | 19.6 | ▼2.4 |
| Natural Law | Kim D. Fioriglio | 1,017 | 1.3 | N/A |
| Total votes | | 77,324 | 100.0 | |

New Jersey general election, 1993
| Party | Candidate | Votes | % | ±% |
|---|---|---|---|---|
| Republican | John F. Gaffney | 26,354 | 26.4 | ▼0.1 |
| Democratic | Tom Foley | 25,932 | 26.0 | ▲2.8 |
| Republican | Fredrick P. Nickles | 25,601 | 25.6 | ▲0.2 |
| Democratic | Denis Floge | 21,959 | 22.0 | ▼2.9 |
| Total votes | | 99,846 | 100.0 | |

1991 New Jersey general election
| Party | Candidate | Votes | % |
|---|---|---|---|
| Republican | John F. Gaffney | 21,833 | 26.5 |
| Republican | Fredrick P. Nickles | 20,948 | 25.4 |
| Democratic | Fred Scerni | 20,503 | 24.9 |
| Democratic | Tom Foley | 19,095 | 23.2 |
| Total votes | | 82,379 | 100.0 |

1989 New Jersey general election
| Party | Candidate | Votes | % | ±% |
|---|---|---|---|---|
| Republican | Dolores G. Cooper | 27,736 | 26.1 | ▼6.4 |
| Democratic | Fred Scerni | 26,833 | 25.2 | ▲6.2 |
| Republican | J. Edward Kline | 26,443 | 24.9 | ▼8.4 |
| Democratic | Mary Ellen Starn | 25,351 | 23.8 | ▲8.6 |
| Total votes | | 106,363 | 100.0 | |

1987 New Jersey general election
| Party | Candidate | Votes | % | ±% |
|---|---|---|---|---|
| Republican | J. Edward Kline | 26,754 | 33.3 | ▼0.8 |
| Republican | Dolores G. Cooper | 26,140 | 32.5 | ▲3.4 |
| Democratic | Alfred "Fred" Scerni | 15,234 | 19.0 | ▼2.2 |
| Democratic | William A. Thompson III | 12,216 | 15.2 | ▼0.4 |
| Total votes | | 80,344 | 100.0 | |

1985 New Jersey general election
| Party | Candidate | Votes | % | ±% |
|---|---|---|---|---|
| Republican | J. Edward Kline | 32,092 | 34.1 | ▲5.6 |
| Republican | Dolores G. Cooper | 27,395 | 29.1 | ▲2.0 |
| Democratic | Joel Jacovitz | 19,899 | 21.2 | ▼1.0 |
| Democratic | Lillian E. Bryant | 14,634 | 15.6 | ▼4.8 |
| Total votes | | 94,020 | 100.0 | |

New Jersey general election, 1983
| Party | Candidate | Votes | % | ±% |
|---|---|---|---|---|
| Republican | John Edward Kline | 26,269 | 28.5 | ▲5.9 |
| Republican | Dolores G. Cooper | 24,981 | 27.1 | ▼2.4 |
| Democratic | Lincoln Green | 20,433 | 22.2 | ▼4.8 |
| Democratic | James T. Brennan | 18,836 | 20.4 | ▼0.1 |
| The Independent Voice | Michael P. Toland | 1,652 | 1.8 | N/A |
| Total votes | | 92,171 | 100.0 | |

Special election, November 2, 1982
| Party | Candidate | Votes | % |
|---|---|---|---|
| Republican | Dolores G. Cooper | 26,244 | 52.6 |
| Democratic | Lincoln Green | 23,104 | 46.3 |
| Jobs-Equality-Business | Willie Norwood | 584 | 1.2 |
| Total votes | | 49,932 | 100.0 |

New Jersey general election, 1981
| Party | Candidate | Votes | % |
|---|---|---|---|
| Republican | William L. Gormley | 32,780 | 29.5 |
| Democratic | Michael J. Matthews | 30,098 | 27.0 |
| Republican | Martin S. Wilson, Jr. | 25,095 | 22.6 |
| Democratic | Joseph L. Bradley | 22,851 | 20.5 |
| Independent | Anthony F. DePazza | 451 | 0.4 |
| Total votes | | 111,275 | 100.0 |

New Jersey general election, 1979
| Party | Candidate | Votes | % | ±% |
|---|---|---|---|---|
| Republican | William L. Gormley | 28,428 | 26.3 | ▲2.0 |
| Democratic | Michael J. Matthews | 28,423 | 26.3 | ▲0.4 |
| Republican | Kenneth C. Le Fevre | 26,095 | 24.1 | ▲0.1 |
| Democratic | Nelson C. Johnson | 25,163 | 23.3 | 0.0 |
| Total votes | | 108,109 | 100.0 | |

New Jersey general election, 1977
| Party | Candidate | Votes | % | ±% |
|---|---|---|---|---|
| Democratic | Michael J. Matthews | 31,305 | 25.9 | ▼0.5 |
| Republican | William L. Gormley | 29,375 | 24.3 | ▼1.4 |
| Republican | Howard Kupperman | 29,030 | 24.0 | ▼2.7 |
| Democratic | Rocco S. Carri | 28,138 | 23.3 | ▲2.1 |
| Honesty-Integrity-Credibility | Joseph J. Polillo | 3,048 | 2.5 | N/A |
| Total votes | | 120,896 | 100.0 | |

New Jersey general election, 1975
| Party | Candidate | Votes | % | ±% |
|---|---|---|---|---|
| Republican | Howard Kupperman | 30,347 | 26.7 | ▲2.8 |
| Democratic | Steven P. Perskie | 30,016 | 26.4 | ▼1.8 |
| Republican | Frederick Perone | 29,291 | 25.7 | ▲1.9 |
| Democratic | Lois Hughes Finifter | 24,167 | 21.2 | ▼2.9 |
| Total votes | | 113,821 | 100.0 | |

New Jersey general election, 1973
| Party | Candidate | Votes | % |
|---|---|---|---|
| Democratic | Steven P. Perskie | 32,187 | 28.2 |
| Democratic | Charles D. Worthington | 27,574 | 24.1 |
| Republican | Howard Kupperman | 27,337 | 23.9 |
| Republican | Samuel A. Curcio | 27,239 | 23.8 |
| Total votes | | 114,337 | 100.0 |

== Election results, 1965–1973 ==
=== Senate ===
1965 New Jersey general election
| Party | Candidate | Votes | % |
|---|---|---|---|
| Democratic | John A. Waddington | 32,292 | 56.9 |
| Republican | John J. Spoltore | 24,390 | 43.0 |
| Socialist Labor | Albert Ronis | 52 | 0.1 |
| Total votes | | 56,734 | 100.0 |

1967 New Jersey general election
| Party | Candidate | Votes | % |
|---|---|---|---|
| Republican | Frank S. Farley | 36,300 | 61.5 |
| Democratic | Harry A. Gaines | 22,716 | 38.5 |
| Total votes | | 59,016 | 100.0 |

1971 New Jersey general election
| Party | Candidate | Votes | % |
|---|---|---|---|
| Democratic | Joseph L. McGahn | 39,257 | 58.1 |
| Republican | Frank S. Farley | 27,509 | 40.7 |
| Independent | Charles Ross | 840 | 1.2 |
| Total votes | | 67,606 | 100.0 |

=== General Assembly ===
New Jersey general election, 1967
| Party | Candidate | Votes | % |
|---|---|---|---|
| Republican | Albert S. Smith | 36,513 | 32.1 |
| Republican | Samuel A. Curcio | 35,745 | 31.5 |
| Democratic | William T. Dunbar | 20,936 | 18.4 |
| Democratic | Samuel Abel | 20,433 | 18.0 |
| Total votes | | 113,627 | 100.0 |

New Jersey general election, 1969
| Party | Candidate | Votes | % |
|---|---|---|---|
| Republican | Albert S. Smith | 35,997 | 32.3 |
| Republican | Samuel A. Curcio | 35,046 | 31.4 |
| Democratic | Joseph J. Messick | 20,116 | 18.0 |
| Democratic | Charles Penman | 19,686 | 17.6 |
| Independent | Raymond V. Broome | 732 | 0.7 |
| Total votes | | 111,577 | 100.0 |

New Jersey general election, 1971
| Party | Candidate | Votes | % |
|---|---|---|---|
| Democratic | Steven P. Perskie | 34,506 | 26.8 |
| Democratic | James A. Colasurdo | 33,789 | 26.2 |
| Republican | Samuel A. Curcio | 30,363 | 23.6 |
| Republican | Howard Haneman | 30,129 | 23.4 |
| Total votes | | 128,787 | 100.0 |
