= Mike Segal =

American politician

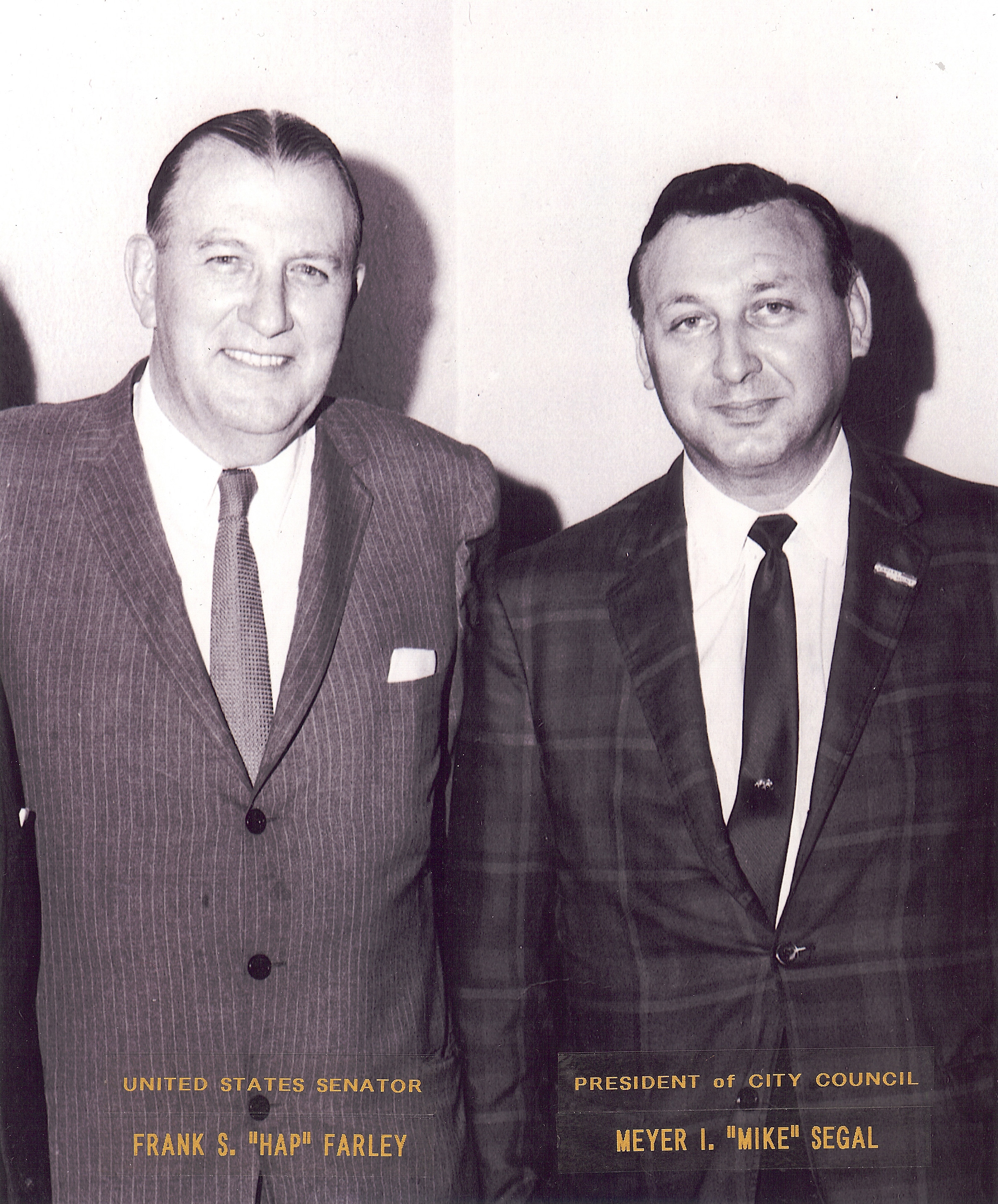
Segal (right) with Senator Frank S. Farley, President of the NJ Senate

Meyer I. "Mike" Segal (September 26, 1922 – June 8, 1982) was the New Jersey politician and businessman who led the initiative to legalize gambling in Atlantic City. At that time, the only legal gambling on the mainland of the United States was in Nevada.

== Leading the gambling initiative ==
By the 1960s Atlantic City, the once chic vacation destination of both the wealthy and the masses, had fallen into disrepair and partial obscurity. The city had been hugely successful from the late 1800s through World War II, as visitors could travel via train to the stately hotels and the beaches, and escape the heat of the cities; the boardwalk, beaches, Steel Pier's diving horse and Miss America Pageant were world famous. Following the war, the proliferation of automobiles gave the average family access to many more destinations than just those that could be reached via railroad. Atlantic City tourism declined, and by the mid 1960s Atlantic City boasted the highest rate of unemployment in the state that had the highest unemployment in the nation.

In late 1968, Mike Segal and a group of influential local businessmen announced they would pursue the possibility of legalizing gambling in the city as a cure for the ailing economy. The initiative received press coverage locally and nationally, as it was the first serious attempt to challenge Nevada's monopoly on gambling.

Shortly after announcing, Segal, hoteliers Gary Malamut and Sonny Goldberg, restaurateur Arnold Orsatti, and others, formed the "Action Committee for Legalized Gaming"; Segal was elected Chairman of the Committee. In the week following the official announcement of the Committee, they received over 2,000 unsolicited phone calls and letters. Leading citizens, like international art dealer and "Merchant to the Rich" Reese Palley, publicly supported the initiative. Numerous articles appeared in local and metropolitan papers.

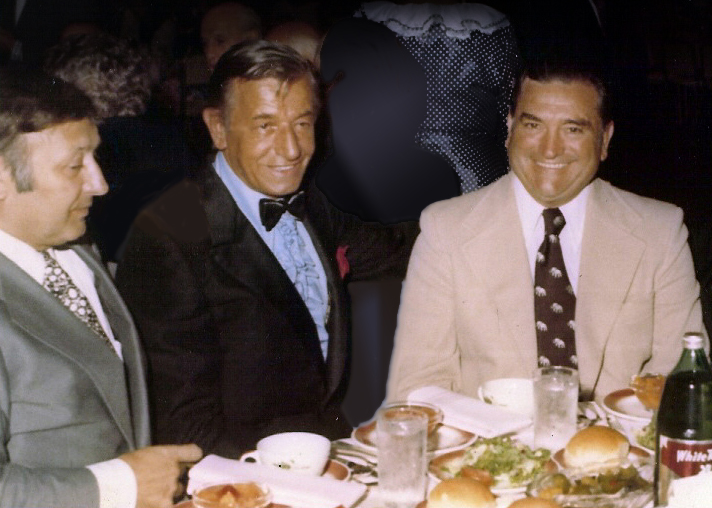
1973 - Segal (L), "Mr. Atlantic City" Skinny D'Amato (C), U.S. Congressman Charles W. Sandman (R).

To garner additional support, Segal openly supported the State Lottery proposal of Democratic Governor Richard J. Hughes, who was not a supporter of legalizing gambling in Atlantic City exclusively. Segal also supported the Camden, New Jersey initiative for legalized gambling, which Camden locals saw as a cure to the financial woes of their declining city.

There was overwhelming local support and powerful political allies. Years later Segal admitted that none of them anticipated the massive resistance that would be mounted by churches and religious groups across the state and that would turn the initiative into an 8-year battle. For the first four years, Segal and his colleagues worked through the Action Committee, and for the last four years they worked behind the scenes with "The Committee to Rebuild Atlantic City." Ultimately, a statewide general referendum in 1976 won approval for gambling in Atlantic City, after the earlier 1974 referendum failed.

The first casino opened in Atlantic City in 1978, and over the next decade tourism in Atlantic City burgeoned to record-breaking proportions. At its peak, in the decade immediately following the opening of gambling casinos, Atlantic City hosted >35 million tourists a year, surpassing both Disney World and Las Vegas as the #1 tourist destination in the country. By 2009, Atlantic City had fallen out of the "Top 10" tourist destinations in the US, and by 2011, the number of annual visitors had declined to 28.5 million.

== Political career ==
Segal entered politics in the 1960s on the Republican ticket as a Councilman in Ventnor City, New Jersey. He served as a Councilman, as President of Council and as a Commissioner before devoting his political efforts exclusively to the Action Committee to Legalize Gaming.

At the outset of his political career, he gained the confidence of powerful State Senator, Frank S. Farley, also a Ventnor resident. From the early 1940s when he succeeded Enoch "Nucky" Johnson, until the early 1970s, Farley was the undisputed leader of the Republican political machine based in Atlantic City and known as "The Boardwalk Empire" during Johnson's reign. Farley was the most powerful of the State Senators, serving 34 years in the legislature, and holding the position of President of the Senate, a position that afforded him the power to direct the legislative process in the state.

Farley initially refused to support the attempt to legalize gambling, as he feared his involvement would bring increased scrutiny on his powerful political machine. By 1970 Segal convinced Farley, and from that time forward the Senator (and eventually ex-Senator) worked behind the scenes to gain approval. Segal also gained the support of U.S Congressman Charles W. Sandman.

== Marine Corps ==
Segal joined the Marine Corps in the late 1930s. He was sent to Honolulu, Hawaii, and was present on December 7, 1941 when the base was attacked by Japanese forces.

Segal served in the Second Marine Division, decorated for their outstanding courage in the Pacific Theater of Operations, notably the battles of Guadalcanal, Saipan and Tarawa. Segal was a Sergeant assigned infantry. He was also a member of a tank crew; his tank, an M4 Sherman, was affectionately nicknamed "King Kong".

Segal is documented with his platoon attacking a Japanese position on Tarawa. He is seen crawling up a hill with his backpack and rifle in an official Marine Corps photograph which appears in both "FOLLOW ME! A History of the Second Marine Division in World War II", and "The World Book Encyclopedia".

Following the war he was active in the Second Marine Division Association, serving as President of the Association 1965-66, Chairman of the 15th Annual Reunion (held in Atlantic City, 1964), as well as Chairman of the U.S. Marine Corps 200th Birthday Ball. He remained active as an officer in both the Second Marine Division Association, and the Marine Corps League, until his death.

== Personal life ==
Segal lived a very public life as a politician, being seen regularly at Atlantic City's nightspots, political functions, and casinos. He counted among his closest friends "Mr. Atlantic City" Skinny D'Amato, the flamboyant nightclub owner who discovered Dean Martin and Jerry Lewis, Samuel H. "Sonny" Schwartz, the highly respected journalist, and Jersey Joe Walcott, the former heavyweight boxing champion of the world.

Segal was the only son of Polish/Russian Jewish immigrants whose father reached the US in 1912, with his mother, Hessie, and three sisters Rose, Claire, and Constance following in 1921; Segal was born in Philadelphia, Pennsylvania, in 1922. He was raised in Philadelphia. His younger sister Molly was later born in Philadelphia.

Subsequent to World War II, Segal married Natalie Youtie, from a prominent Atlantic City family of professionals and businessmen. Initially settling in Philadelphia, they subsequently moved to Atlantic City in 1959, where they raised their family.
