= Chris A. Brown =

Member of the New Jersey Senate

Member of the New Jersey Senate from the 2nd district
- In office January 9, 2018 – July 21, 2021
- Preceded by: Colin Bell
- Succeeded by: Vincent J. Polistina

Deputy Minority Conference Chair of the New Jersey Senate
- In office January 9, 2018 – July 19, 2021
- Leader: Tom Kean
- Preceded by: Jennifer Beck

Member of the New Jersey General Assembly from the 2nd district
- In office January 10, 2012 – January 9, 2018
- Preceded by: Vincent J. Polistina
- Succeeded by: John Armato

Personal details
- Born: August 3, 1964 (age 61) Atlantic City, New Jersey, U.S.
- Party: Republican
- Spouse: Christine Brown
- Children: Three
- Website: Legislative website Senate GOP Website

Military service
- Branch/service: United States Army
- Years of service: 1987-2009
- Rank: Major
- Battles/wars: Gulf War

Christopher A. Brown (born August 3, 1964) is an American Republican Party politician who represented the 2nd Legislative District in the New Jersey Senate from January 9, 2018, to July 19, 2021, when he left office to accept a position with the New Jersey Department of Community Affairs. He previously served in the New Jersey General Assembly from January 10, 2012, to January 9, 2018. He is a veteran of the Gulf War.

== Early life ==
Brown was born in Atlantic City, New Jersey, in 1964. He earned a B.A. degree from Rutgers University in 1987, and after graduation was commissioned as a Second Lieutenant in the United States Army. He served in the Army during the Gulf War, attached to the 82nd Airborne Division. He was awarded the Bronze Star Medal and Combat Infantryman Badge for his service in the ground offensive in Iraq. He received a J.D. degree from Widener University School of Law in 1991. In 1991–1992, Brown interned with L. Anthony Gibson, Presiding Judge of the Chancery Division of the New Jersey Superior Court for Atlantic and Cape May Counties. In 1992–1993, he clerked for Superior Court Judge Charles R. Previti. He is board certified by the New Jersey Supreme Court as a civil trial attorney and has been admitted to the bar in New Jersey and Pennsylvania. He has served as the Prosecutor of Egg Harbor Township, Solicitor for the Atlantic City Council, Solicitor for the Atlantic City Board of Education and Assistant Solicitor for Egg Harbor Township. In 2008, Brown was called up for service in the Iraq War and spent three months preparing to deploy to Iraq. However, the Army determined that it had made a mistake in activating him, and he was sent home, receiving an honorable discharge. Brown is a resident of Ventnor City, New Jersey with his wife Christine, married 1993, and their three children.

== New Jersey Assembly ==
In 2011, Brown ran as a Republican for the General Assembly representing the 2nd District, filling the seat of Vincent J. Polistina, who left the Assembly in an unsuccessful bid for the New Jersey Senate, running against incumbent Jim Whelan. Brown and his running mate John F. Amodeo defeated the Democratic candidates, Alisa Cooper and Damon Tyner. He was sworn in on January 10, 2012. In the Assembly he served as Assistant Republican Leader from January 12, 2016, to January 9, 2018.

=== Committees ===
- Consumer Affairs
- Tourism and the Arts
- Regulatory Oversight
- Tourism and Gaming

== New Jersey Senate ==
After incumbent senator Jim Whelen's death on August 22, 2017, Democrat Colin Bell was unanimously selected to fill the remainder of Whelan's senate term and took office, making him the incumbent senator going into the November 2017 general election. In one of the most expensive of the 120 legislative races in the 2017 election, in which $4.6 million was spent, Brown defeated Bell by a 54%-46% margin, taking a Senate seat that had been held by Democrats since 2008 and giving the Republicans their only Senate seat that changed parties, in an election that had many major victories for the Democratic Party across the state. In the Senate, Brown served as Deputy Conference Leader since January 9, 2018. On February 18, 2021, Brown announced he would not run for reelection, stating "while holding elective office is something I do, it’s not who I am". On July 19, 2021, Brown resigned from office when Governor Phil Murphy appointed Brown to an advisory role in the New Jersey Department of Community Affairs, specifically advising on Atlantic City. Brown's Senate seat was filled by Vincent J. Pollistina.

=== Committees ===
- Joint Committee on Economic Justice and Equal Payment
- Higher Education
- State Government, Wagering, Tourism, and Historic Preservation

== Electoral history ==
=== New Jersey Senate ===
2017 New Jersey Senate election in the 2nd Legislative District
Party	Candidate	Votes	%	±%
Republican	Chris Brown	26,950	53.5	▲8.5
Democratic	Colin Bell (Incumbent)	23,406	46.5	▼8.5
Total votes		'50,356'	'100.0'	

=== Assembly ===
Brown was elected to the Assembly in 2011 Brown was re-elected in 2013, then again in 2015.

2015 New Jersey General Assembly election for the 2nd District
Party	Candidate	Votes	%	±%
Republican	Chris Brown	18,959	26.5	▲0.9
Democratic	Vincent Mazzeo	18,279	25.5	▲0.7
Democratic	Colin Bell	17,433	24.4	▲0.9
Republican	Will Pauls	16,907	23.6	▼1.1
Total votes		'71,578'	'100.0'	

2013 New Jersey General Assembly election for the 2nd District
Party	Candidate	Votes	%	±%
Republican	Chris Brown	26,022	25.6	▼1.5
Democratic	Vincent Mazzeo	25,182	24.77	▲1.8
Republican	John F. Amodeo	25,131	24.72	▼4.5
Democratic	Nick Russo	23,921	23.5	▲2.8
Brownie Plus Me	Gary Stein	1,394	1.4	N/A
Total votes		'101,650'	'100.0'	

2011 New Jersey General Assembly election for the 2nd District
Party	Candidate	Votes	%
Republican	John F. Amodeo	25,330	29.2
Republican	Chris Brown	23,440	27.1
Democratic	Damon Tyner	19,919	23.0
Democratic	Alisa Cooper	17,933	20.7
Total votes		86,622	100.0

New Jersey Senate
Preceded by Colin Bell	Member of the New Jersey Senate from the 2nd District; January 9, 2018 - July 21, 2021	Succeeded by Vincent J. Polistina
New Jersey General Assembly
Preceded by Vincent J. Polistina	Member of the New Jersey General Assembly from the 2nd District; January 10, 2012 – January 9, 2018; With: John F. Amodeo, Vince Mazzeo	Succeeded by John Armato
