= Steven P. Perskie =

American politician

3rd Chairman of the New Jersey Casino Control Commission
- In office 1990–1994
- Appointed by: James Florio
- Preceded by: Valerie H. Armstrong (acting)
- Succeeded by: James R. Hurley (acting)

Member of the New Jersey Senate from the 2nd district
- In office January 10, 1978 – June 28, 1982
- Preceded by: Joseph McGahn
- Succeeded by: William Gormley

Member of the New Jersey General Assembly from the 2nd district
- In office January 11, 1972 – January 10, 1978
- Preceded by: Samuel A. Curcio; Albert S. Smith
- Succeeded by: William Gormley; Michael J. Matthews

Personal details
- Born: January 10, 1945 (age 81) Philadelphia, Pennsylvania, U.S.
- Party: Democratic
- Relations: Joseph B. Perskie (grandfather); Marvin D. Perskie (uncle)
- Parent: David M. Perskie (father)
- Education: Yale University (BA); University of Pennsylvania (JD); New York University (LLM)

Steven P. Perskie (born January 10, 1945, in Philadelphia, Pennsylvania) is a former New Jersey Superior Court judge in Atlantic City, New Jersey, and a former Democratic Party politician from Margate City, New Jersey. Perskie was a member of the New Jersey General Assembly from the 2nd Legislative District from 1971 to 1977. He was elected to the New Jersey Senate in 1977. Perskie was Chief of Staff to New Jersey Governor James Florio from 1989 - 1990 and as the third chairman of the New Jersey Casino Control Commission from 1990 to 1994. Perskie worked as both a corporate and private practice attorney.

== Early life and education ==
Perskie attended Atlantic City High School. In 1966, he graduated from Yale University and in 1969 earned a Juris Doctor at the University of Pennsylvania Law School. In 1970, he earned a masters in taxation from New York University.

== Career ==
Perskie was elected to the New Jersey General Assembly in 1971 at age 26, and re-elected in 1973 and 1975. As an assemblyman, he was the primary advocate and sponsor for the introduction of casino gaming in Atlantic City and was responsible for drafting what would become the New Jersey Casino Control Act.

Party leadership at the Democratic convention in 1977 roundly supported Perskie over sitting Senator Joseph McGahn by a margin of 266 to 77. McGahn ran in the general election as an independent, with Perskie beating both McGahn and Republican candidate Frederick Perone. Perskie and McGahn had won election to the Legislature together in 1971, despite the Republicans 4-1 edge in voter registration.

In 1981, Perskie was again challenged in the general election by McGahn, who ran as a Republican. Perskie won reelection with 29,151 votes, defeating McGahn, who received 28,149.

Perskie was appointed an Atlantic County Superior Court Judge in 1982. In 1989, he resigned from the bench to manage James Florio's successful gubernatorial campaign. He served as Florio's Chief of Staff from 1989 to 1990.

Perskie was appointed as Chairman of the New Jersey Casino Control Commission in 1990 and served in that capacity until 1994. During his tenure, Perskie spearheaded a comprehensive restructuring of the agency. On March 29, 1994, he announced his resignation from the Casino Control Commission to become Vice President and General Counsel of Players International, an operator of riverboat casinos with no interests in New Jersey. In 1996, Perskie left Players and entered into private law practice. In 2001, Perskie was reappointed to the bench and was confirmed for permanent tenure in December 2008.

In September 2009, the New Jersey Supreme Court's Advisory Committee on Judicial Conduct filed a complaint alleging that Perskie misled a State Senate panel regarding a potential conflict of interest. On August 1, 2011, the New Jersey Supreme Court determined that he did not intentionally mislead the State Senate panel.

On February 1, 2010, Perskie retired from the bench and joined the law firm of Perskie, Mairone, Brog & Baylinson in Linwood, New Jersey, to open a mediation / arbitration practice.

On October 10, 2018, Perskie was inducted into the Gaming Hall of Fame. The selection committee lauded his transformative work in the creation and oversight of gaming regulation in New Jersey, which served as a template for gaming across the country and paved the way for the evolution of the industry in its current form.

== Family ==
Perskie is the son of former Atlantic County Judge David M. Perskie, who sat on the bench from 1966 to 1969, and the grandson of former New Jersey Supreme Court Justice Joseph B. Perskie, who served from 1933 to 1947. He is the nephew of Marvin D. Perskie, who served as an Assemblyman in the New Jersey State Legislature from 1965 to 1967.

Government offices
Preceded by Valerie H. Armstrong (acting)	Chair of the New Jersey Casino Control Commission; 1990–1994	Succeeded by James R. Hurley (acting)
