= John F. Amodeo =

American Republican politician

Member of the New Jersey General Assembly from the 2nd district
- In office January 8, 2008 – January 14, 2014 Serving with Vincent J. Polistina (2008–12); Chris A. Brown (2012–14)
- Preceded by: Francis J. Blee; Jim Whelan
- Succeeded by: Vince Mazzeo

Personal details
- Born: August 1, 1950 (age 76)
- Party: Republican
- Website: Legislative web page

John F. Amodeo (born August 1, 1950) is an American Republican politician, who served in the New Jersey General Assembly from January 8, 2008, until January 14, 2014, where he represented the 2nd Legislative District.

Amodeo serves in the Assembly on the Agriculture and Natural Resources Committee and the Transportation, Public Works and Independent Authorities Committee.

Amodeo served on the Linwood City Council from 1998 to 2005, and on the city's Planning Board from 2004 to 2005. He is a crane operator with International Union of Operating Engineers Local 825.

== Early life and education ==
Born in Camden, New Jersey, Amodeo was raised in Margate City and attended St. Augustine Preparatory School.

Amodeo received a B.A. from Mount Saint Mary College with a major in History and Political Science.

In the 2013 elections, Amodeo and Brown faced a challenge from Northfield Mayor Vince Mazzeo and Longport Mayor Nick Russo with Mazzeo declared the winner for the second seat, 32 votes ahead of Amodeo. Amodeo filed for a recount after Mazzeo had been declared the winner by a margin of 38 votes among the more than 100,000 ballots cast and conceded to Mazzeo shortly after a month-long process showed Mazzeo ahead by 51 votes.
