= Joseph McGahn =

American politician

Member of the New Jersey Senate from the 2nd district
- In office January 11, 1972 – January 10, 1978
- Preceded by: Frank S. Farley
- Succeeded by: Steven P. Perskie

Personal details
- Born: Joseph Leo McGahn; March 29, 1917 Atlantic City, New Jersey, U.S.
- Died: December 24, 1999 (aged 82) Northfield, New Jersey, U.S.
- Party: Democratic (1971–77); Independent (1977); Republican (1981)

Joseph Leo McGahn (March 29, 1917 – December 24, 1999) was an American obstetrician and Democratic Party politician from New Jersey who served in the New Jersey Senate from 1972 to 1978, where he was a key figure in bringing casino gambling to Atlantic City.

== Education and medical career ==
McGahn was born in Atlantic City. He graduated from Holy Spirit High School in Absecon, attended St. Mary's College of Maryland, graduating summa cum laude in 1939 and was awarded his Doctor of Medicine degree in 1943 from the University of Pittsburgh School of Medicine. After graduating from medical school, he served as a general surgeon in the United States Army Medical Corps during World War II.

After returning from military service, he practiced internal medicine and surgery in Atlantic City. Starting in 1951, he began a specialty in obstetrics and gynecology.

== Legislative career ==
McGahn served on the Absecon, New Jersey City Council and as its mayor. He won the Democratic primary for State Senate in 1971 in the district, in which registered Republican Party heavily outnumbered Democrats, and ran for office without the support of the local Democratic Party leadership. On Election Day, November 3, 1971, McGahn defeated incumbent Frank S. Farley, who had served a total of 34 years in the New Jersey Legislature, to win a seat in the New Jersey Senate, in a race in which McGahn focused on corruption, in the wake of federal investigation of the Republican Party machine in Atlantic City.

Shortly after taking office, McGahn was the cosponsor of a bill to bring casino gambling to New Jersey. He was described by The New York Times as the "principal architect" of legislation that brought casino gambling to Atlantic City. He also pushed for the creation of the New Jersey Casino Control Commission, considered the most rigorous casino enforcement agency at the time. He ran for office again in 1973, again winning without support of the Democratic establishment. While in the Senate, he served as chairman of the Committee on Agriculture, Energy and the Environment. In 1974, McGahn pushed for legislation granting exemptions to healthcare institutions from a requirement to provide abortions or sterilizations if they objected on religious or moral grounds. The bill passed the legislature and was signed into law by Governor Brendan Byrne despite his feelings that the legislation "may have gone too far".

Party leadership at the Democratic convention in 1977 roundly supported Steven P. Perskie, a Democratic member of the New Jersey General Assembly, by a margin of 266 to 77. McGahn ran in the general election as an independent, with Perskie beating both McGahn and Republican candidate Frederick Perone. Both McGahn and Perskie had won election to the Legislature in 1971, despite the Republicans 4-1 edge in registration. In 1981, McGahn ran for and won the Republican primary, and again challenged Perskie in the general election. Perskie won reelection with 29,151 votes, defeating McGahn, who received 28,149.

== After the legislature ==
Both before and after his service in the legislature, he worked at the Atlantic City Medical Center, specializing in emergency medicine. From 1984 to 1989, he became medical director at Resorts International.

On September 27, 1995, the South Jersey Transportation Authority named the bridge connecting the Atlantic City Expressway with local Atlantic City streets in honor of McGahn.

McGahn had been a longtime resident of Absecon, New Jersey. He died on December 24, 1999, at Meadowview Nursing Home in Northfield, New Jersey.
