= Fred Scerni =

American politician

Member of the New Jersey General Assembly from the 2nd Legislative District
- In office January 9, 1990 – January 14, 1992 Serving with Dolores G. Cooper
- Preceded by: J. Edward Kline
- Succeeded by: John F. Gaffney; Frederick P. Nickles

Personal details
- Born: February 18, 1948 (age 78) Atlantic City, New Jersey, U.S.
- Party: Democratic

Fred Scerni (born February 18, 1948) is an American politician who served in the New Jersey General Assembly from the 2nd Legislative District from 1990 to 1992.
