= 500 Club =

Nightclub and supper club in Atlantic City, New Jersey, U.S.

- The 500 Club

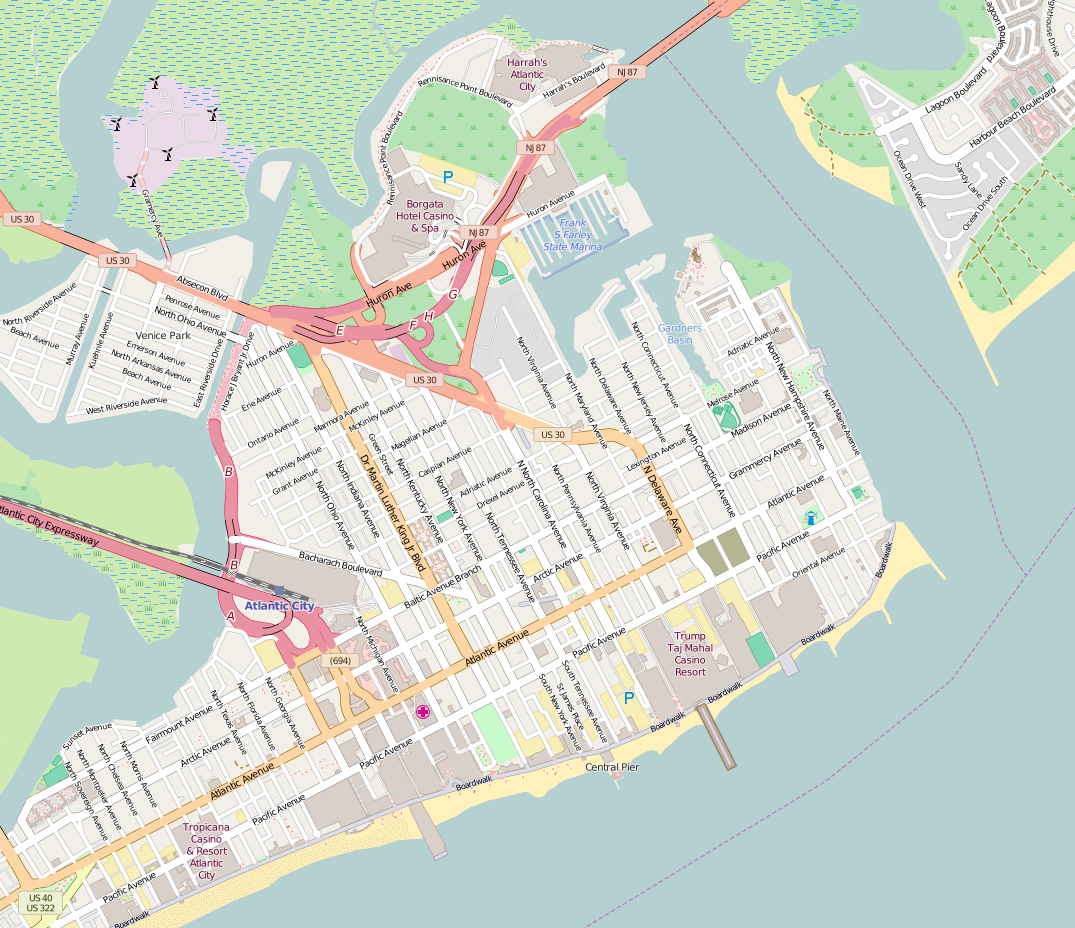
- Location in Atlantic City
- Former names: 500 Cafe
- Address: 6 South Missouri Avenue; Atlantic City, New Jersey; United States
- Coordinates: 39°21′24″N 74°26′16″W
- Owner: Paul "Skinny" D'Amato
- Capacity: 700
- Type: Nightclub

Construction
- Opened: 1930s
- Closed: 1973

The 500 Club, popularly known as The Five, was a nightclub and supper club at 6 South Missouri Avenue in Atlantic City, New Jersey, United States. It was owned by racketeer Paul "Skinny" D'Amato, and operated from the 1930s until the building burned down in 1973.

The main bar was large and black, with black and white zebra-patterned wallpaper on the walls of the room. An indoor waterfall surrounded by imitation exotic vegetation stood in the back. The club's main showroom, the Vermilion Room, often featured the likes of Frank Sinatra, Sammy Davis Jr., and the slapstick comedy duo of Dean Martin and Jerry Lewis.

The club and bar were destroyed in an electrical fire in June 1973, resulting in $1.5 million worth of damage. Subsequent plans to rebuild or reopen the club in a megaresort hotel in Atlantic City amounted to nothing in the years leading up to D'Amato's death in 1984.

== History ==
The 500 Club was originally owned by Phil Barr. (Note: Barr purchased two houses on Missouri Avenue in the mid 1930s. He demolished them and built a two-story yellow brick building on the site, calling his venture the 500 Cafe. The business was a horse betting parlor by day and a nightclub with showgirls performing in the evenings.) In 1942, Paul "Skinny" D'Amato, who was known to have ties to organized crime, assumed ownership. (Note: D'Amato was able to realize his dream of owning a nightclub by gathering a group of investors. The 500 Cafe building was repossessed by the mortgage holder for nonpayment and the venue had been closed down for a few months. D'Amato's uncle, a chef, rented the building from the mortgage holder.) Summers and Swan claim that Amato was in fact a front man for mobster Marco Reginelli. (Note: While Reginelli was a regular patron of the club, he was not its owner. Documents show that D'Amato and partner Irvin Wolf purchased the half interest in the 500 Cafe from Mario Di Fonzo in June 1946. They agreed not to use the 500 Cafe name for their venture, so it became the 500 Club. A news note in Billboard magazine from this time frame indicates that D'Amato and Wolf were the sole owners of the club.) That year, the club was refurbished as a musical bar with a small dance floor and was known as the 500 Cafe. Drink prices started at 40 cents, with a 20 percent discount for men in uniform, and suppers started at one dollar. In June 1946, D'Amato and his partner, Irvin Wolf, were able to buy out the half interest of Marco Di Fozio. They changed the venue's name to the 500 Club and were now the sole owners of the business. D'Amato became the sole owner of the venue shortly before his 1949 marriage.

The names of the celebrities who performed at the club were written in cement on the sidewalk in front of it, similar to Grauman's Chinese Theatre. Celebrities often dropped by the club, including Joe DiMaggio, "who had his own table and his own waitress to serve him free drinks". Like other clubs in Atlantic City, the 500 Club was patronized by both whites and African-Americans. Mobsters and politicians were frequent patrons, with the former "making deals" with the latter; these guests were never presented with a bill.

During D'Amato's tenure, the 500 Club began attracting top-name talent. It opened at 5 p.m. and closed at 10 a.m. The last show was at 4 a.m., while illegal gaming at "roulette wheels, craps tables, baccarat and high-stakes card games" went on in the back rooms. The door to the back rooms was beyond the main showroom and was guarded by a doorman; it opened on D'Amato's nod or word. D'Amato shut down the illegal casino in the early 1950s in the wake of pressure on organized crime exerted by the Kefauver Committee in the United States Senate and expanded the supper club aspect. In 1955 the club expanded its show seating capacity to 700.

== Architecture and fittings ==
The main bar was large and black with curves in many directions. The room had black and white zebra-patterned wallpaper, in the style of New York's El Morocco club, and an indoor waterfall surrounded by imitation exotic vegetation stood in the back. Beyond the main bar was a smaller bar and a small showroom, and after that the club's main showroom, the Vermilion Room, with its burgundy velvet wallpaper. The small front room was used for year-round lounge acts and the main showroom with supper service featured top-billed acts in the summer months and for special bookings.

== Acts ==
Everybody's career jumped a little higher and a little faster because of the 500 Club.

— Frank Sinatra

The 500 Club became one of the most popular nightspots on the East Coast, regularly attracting top-name talent. Performers included Frank Sinatra, Sammy Davis, Jr., Martin and Lewis, the Will Mastin Trio, Jimmy Durante, Eartha Kitt, Patti Page, Sophie Tucker, the Jackie Paris Trio, Milton Berle, Nat King Cole, and Liberace, among many others.

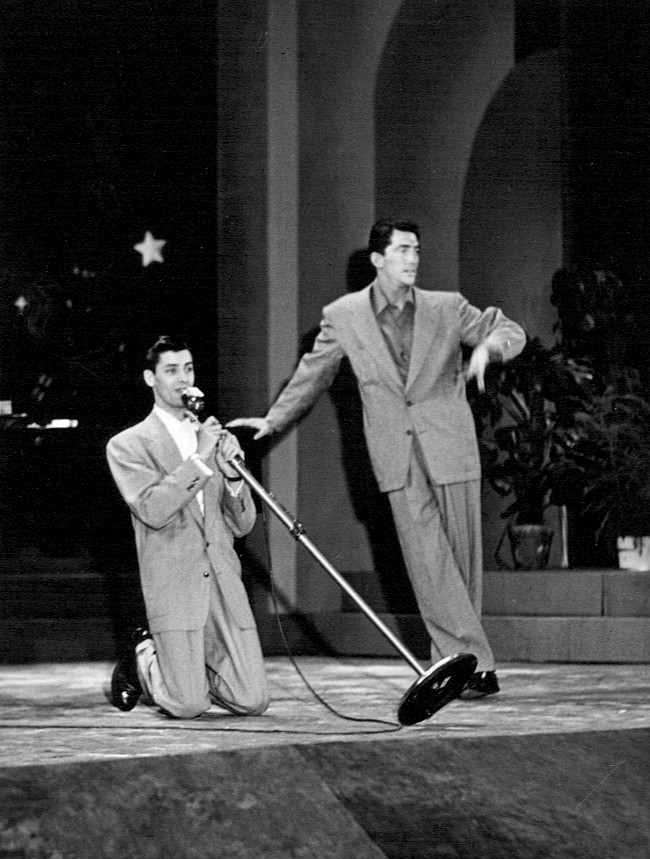
Martin and Lewis in 1948

Frank Sinatra called on his friendship with D'Amato to perform at the club in the 1940s when his career was at a lull. He regularly performed there from the 1940s through to the 1960s, each time doing all four shows and waiving his fee. During Sinatra's engagements at the club in the 1950s, the 500 Club marquee read simply, "He's Back". Comedian Pat Henry started as Sinatra's opening act at the 500 Club in 1958, continuing in that capacity in Las Vegas and other Sinatra venues for the next two decades. In 1960 New York AM radio station WNEW garnered 129,837 entries for its drawing for three couples to accompany disc jockey William B. Williams to a Sinatra performance at the 500 Club followed by a hotel stay. Sinatra was questioned about his association with Mafia gangster Tommy Lucchese by the United States House Select Committee on Crime in 1972, but said that he had only met Lucchese during his performances at the 500 Club.

Dean Martin and Jerry Lewis paired up to do slapstick comedy for the first time at the 500 Club on July 25, 1946. While Martin was trying to get gigs as a singer, Lewis performed as a comedian at the club. One night a different act failed to show up and Lewis suggested to the owner that he hire Martin to do comedy with him. The owner was skeptical, but the two went ahead and tried to devise an act on paper in their hotel room, which did not work. The next night, they went on stage and improvised for three hours, bringing the house down. The comedy duo of Martin and Lewis was popular in nightclubs and in film from 1946 to 1956.

After he and Jerry Lewis broke up their act, Dean Martin did not perform at the club again until August 1962. Martin was originally billed as a solo act, but was joined by both Frank Sinatra and Sammy Davis, Jr. at the midpoint of his engagement. The three performed as "The Rat Pack" until Martin's engagement at the club was over; this was the last time the Rat Pack performed in Atlantic City. Davis, Martin, and Sinatra performed their three night Rat Pack act at the club for no fee. The club was in financial difficulty at the time; they were all close friends of D'Amato and had been helped by him in earlier times. A private recording was made of the August 25, 1962 4AM show at the 500 Club – the last performance of the Rat Pack there. It was later distributed as a souvenir to patrons of the now defunct Sinatrarama Room at Philadelphia's Latimer Cafe. The club continued to have financial problems in the 1970s. The Internal Revenue Service closed the club for back taxes in August 1971. D'Amato was allowed to reopen in November 1971 after an agreement was reached regarding payment of them.

== Fire and aftermath ==
The club was destroyed in an electrical fire that burned for four hours in June 1973, with over 200 firemen fighting the fire. The blaze, which also destroyed a next-door restaurant and bar, resulting in $1.5 million worth of damage, was believed to have originated in a dressing room. The building was not insured. D'Amato said in response to the news of the fire, which had taken place shortly after a refurbishment, "I was born on this street, if I can, I'll rebuild it, but I don't know how". In 1976, after a New Jersey referendum approved the establishment of casino gambling in the state, D'Amato said he hoped to re-establish the 500 Club at one of the city's resort hotels. D'Amato believed that legalized gambling would be good for both the city and for those with businesses related to the entertainment industry. He was committed enough to the idea to appear on television's 60 Minutes to voice support for the pro-gambling cause. He died in 1984 without realizing his ambition.

The parking deck of the Trump Plaza Hotel and Casino now occupies the site. There is an historical marker honoring Paul "Skinny" D'Amato near the intersection of Atlantic Avenue and 500 Club Lane, which is near the former location of the 500 Club.

== Legacy ==
At the end of the 20th century, plans were floated to recreate the 500 Club either at the Trump Marina Hotel Casino or at the Sands Hotel and Casino, but neither materialized. D'Amato's daughter Paulajane, who grew up in an apartment over the 500 Club, is now a member of the 500 Club Committee, which sponsors benefit concerts. In September 2015 the Philly Pops recreated the 500 Club in a Philadelphia restaurant, featuring performances by Deana Martin and Michael Andrew.

== See also ==
- List of supper clubs

== Sources ==
- Cunningham, John T.; Cole, Kenneth D. (2000). Atlantic City. Arcadia Publishing. ISBN 0-7385-0426-2.
- Fishgall, Gary (2010). Gonna Do Great Things: The Life of Sammy Davis, Jr. Simon & Schuster. ISBN 978-1-4391-3157-2.
- Karmel, James R. (2015). Gambling on the American Dream: Atlantic City and the Casino Era. Routledge. ISBN 978-1-317-31462-2.
- Reppetto, Thomas (2006). Bringing Down the Mob: The War Against the American Mafia. Macmillan. ISBN 1-4299-5253-9.
- Simon, Bryant (2004). Boardwalk of Dreams: Atlantic City and the Fate of Urban America. Oxford University Press. ISBN 978-0-19-516753-5.
- Sokolic, William H.; Ruffolo, Robert E. Jr. (2006). Atlantic City Revisited. Arcadia Publishing. ISBN 978-0-7385-4904-0.
- Summers, Anthony; Swan, Robbyn (2007). Sinatra: The Life. Knopf Doubleday Publishing Group. ISBN 978-0-307-42776-2.
- Van Meter, Jonathan (2004). The Last Good Time: Skinny D'Amato, the Notorious 500 Club, and the Rise and Fall of Atlantic City. Crown Publishing Group. ISBN 978-1-4000-5297-4.
