= William Gormley =

American politician

Member of the New Jersey Senate from the 2nd district
- In office September 16, 1982 – February 17, 2007
- Preceded by: Steven P. Perskie
- Succeeded by: James J. McCullough

Member of the New Jersey General Assembly from the 2nd district
- In office January 10, 1978 – September 16, 1982
- Preceded by: Howard Kupperman
- Succeeded by: Dolores G. Cooper

Personal details
- Born: May 2, 1946 (age 80) Atlantic City, New Jersey, U.S.
- Party: Republican
- Spouse: Virginia
- Children: 4
- Education: University of Notre Dame (BA); Villanova University (JD)
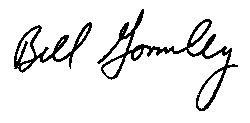
- Signature

William L. "Bill" Gormley (born May 2, 1946) is an American attorney and Republican Party politician from New Jersey who represented most of Atlantic County, New Jersey in New Jersey's state Legislature from 1978 to 2007. Gormley was an imposing figure in New Jersey government, referred to by David Wildstein as "one of the most consequential legislators of his generation," and a leader in the economic development of the Atlantic City region.

Gormley was elected to the New Jersey General Assembly in 1977 and served until 1982, when he won a special election to the New Jersey Senate. He remained in that office until resigning in 2007. He also ran unsuccessful campaigns for Governor of New Jersey, the United States House of Representatives, and the United States Senate.

== Education and military service ==
William L. Gormley was born in Atlantic City, New Jersey on May 2, 1946. His father, Gerard Gormley, served as Atlantic County Sheriff.

Gormley graduated from St. Augustine Preparatory School in 1964. He received a B.A. from the University of Notre Dame in History and was awarded a J.D. from Villanova University. He served in the United States Marine Corps and was honorably discharged in 1975 with the rank of captain.

== Political career ==
=== New Jersey General Assembly (1978–82) ===
Gormley was first elected to the New Jersey General Assembly in 1977. Because the General Assembly uses dual-member districts, his election came at the expense of his own running mate, Howard Kupperman. As of 2025, Kupperman is the last member of the General Assembly to lose to their running mate. Gormley and Kupperman ran against Michael Matthews, a popular and well-known Atlantic County freeholder, and Rocco Carri. Matthews finished first in the race, with Gormley winning second place by 345 votes over Kupperman. He was re-elected in 1979 and 1981 as the top vote-getter in the district.

In 1981, Gormley was the most vocal member of a small group of Republican lawmakers who joined with Democrats to eliminate the "county line" system, a practice of awarding favorable ballot positions to candidates endorsed by county political organizations. Though the county line would be restored years later, the legislation paved the way for Tom Kean to win the 1981 Republican primary against the establishment candidate, Pat Kramer. Kean served two terms as one of the most popular governors in New Jersey history. "Getting rid of the party line cracked Kramer and made Kean," recalled Republican campaign strategist Dave Murray. "Bill Gormley was the one shouting it from the rooftops. Really, there's only one word to describe him – and that's ballsy."

=== New Jersey Senate ===
In 1990, Gormley cast the only Republican vote for then Gov. Jim Florio's ban on assault weapons and became a target of the National Rifle Association. As political payback, the NRA funded the campaigns of a string of Gormley opponents in both local races and runs for higher office.

In 1991, after suing the governor of New Jersey to protect the rights of coastal homeowners, Gormley wrote and secured passage for a constitutional amendment that defined and delineated the rights of property owners who held riparian lands. The amendment resolved a protracted and contentious legal dispute that had pitted the state's jurisdictional powers against private ownership rights.

In 1992, Gormley wrote a constitutional amendment that shifted the cost for the operation of the county court system to the state, creating a more coordinated and modern justice system.

As chairman of the Senate Judiciary Committee, Gormley led a 2001 investigation into the practice of racial profiling by New Jersey State Police. The nine-day hearings ultimately led to reform legislation to eradicate racial profiling, including a system of state oversight and monitoring.

==== Growth of Atlantic City ====
As senator, Gormley was credited with writing legislation to secure state funding for numerous development projects in the Atlantic City region, including the Atlantic City Corridor Project, Boardwalk Hall, the Atlantic City Rail Terminal, the Atlantic City–Brigantine Connector, the Borgata, the Quarter at Tropicana Atlantic City, The Pier Shops at Caesars, the Atlantic City Convention Center, and Atlantic City International Airport.

== Electoral history ==
Over the course of his career, Gormley ran for higher office three times and lost in the primary each time. He ran for governor in 1989, the U.S. House of Representatives in 1994 and the U.S. Senate in 2000, when he lost to Bob Franks by 3,700 votes.

- 1989 Race for Governor (Republican primary)
  - Jim Courter (R), 29.02%
  - W. Cary Edwards (R), 22.04%
  - Chuck Hardwick (R), 21.29%
  - William Gormley (R), 17.17%
  - Gerald Cardinale (R), 8.33%
  - Tom Blomquist (R), 0.98%
  - Lois Rand (R), 0.66%
  - James A. Kolyer, III (R), 0.51%
- 1994 Race for U.S.House (Republican primary)
  - Frank LoBiondo (R), 54.47%
  - William Gormley (R), 35.26%
  - Robert D. Green (R), 10.27%
- 2000 Race for U.S. Senate (Republican primary)
  - Bob Franks (R), 35.68%
  - William Gormley (R), 34.10%
  - James W. Treffinger (R), 17.66%
  - Murray Sabrin (R), 12.56%

== Charitable projects ==
Gormley has also been active in a number of philanthropic efforts and charitable projects in the Atlantic City region, benefitting organizations such as the Daughters of Our Lady of the Sacred Heart, Big Brothers and Big Sisters and the Sisters of Christian Charity. Gormley also helped lead fundraising efforts to build a facility for the Milton and Betty Katz Jewish Community Center in Margate, spearheaded the recruitment of speakers for a lecture series at the William J. Hughes Center for Public Policy at Stockton College (now Stockton University) and, along with his wife Virginia, founded the Atlantic City Friends of Music to raise money to support music and arts programs in Atlantic City schools. On Oct. 21, 2021, Gormley received the Gregor Mendel Medal, the highest honor bestowed by his alma mater, St. Augustine Preparatory School, for his many innovative charitable contributions to his community. A video tribute to Gormley included appearances from former New Jersey Attorney General John Farmer, Jr., former U.S. Environmental Protection Agency Administrator Lisa Jackson, and Port Authority of New York and New Jersey Chairman Kevin O’Toole, a former State Senate colleague.

== Post-political career ==
In 2007, New Jersey Supreme Court Chief Justice Stuart Rabner appointed Gormley chairman of the Public Officers Salary Review Commission.

Gormley is currently a partner in the law firm of DLA Piper. He resides in Margate City, New Jersey with his wife, Virginia.
