= Michael J. Matthews =

American politician

33rd Mayor of Atlantic City
- In office July 1, 1982 – March 13, 1984
- Preceded by: Joseph Lazarow
- Succeeded by: James L. Usry

Member of the New Jersey General Assembly from the 2nd district
- In office January 10, 1978 – January 10, 1984
- Preceded by: Steven P. Perskie
- Succeeded by: J. Edward Kline

Personal details
- Born: Michael Joseph Matthews; January 7, 1934 Upland, Pennsylvania, U.S.
- Died: January 2, 2014 (aged 79) Linwood, New Jersey, U.S.
- Party: Democratic

Michael Joseph Matthews (January 7, 1934 – January 2, 2014) was an American politician who was the mayor of Atlantic City, New Jersey from 1982 to 1984. A member of the Democratic Party, he was mayor for 21 months before he was recalled and sent to prison for extortion committed during his time in office.

== Early life ==
Matthews was born on January 7, 1934, in Upland, Pennsylvania and graduated from Atlantic City High School. He received a degree in business administration from American University in 1966.

== Political career ==
He was elected to the Linwood, New Jersey City Council in 1969 and served on the Atlantic County Board of Chosen Freeholders from 1972 to 1974. He represented the 2nd Legislative District in the New Jersey General Assembly from 1978 to 1984. After moving into Atlantic City, he was elected to the City Commission in 1980, serving as director of Revenue and Finance.

In the early 1980s, Matthews approached Atlantic City resident Philip "Crazy Phil" Leonetti, nephew of Italian American Mafia crime boss Nicodemo "Little Nicky" Scarfo and a lieutenant in the Scarfo crime family, for assistance with campaign funding. The Scarfo organization controlled organized crime in Philadelphia and South Jersey. Leonetti and Matthews met privately on several occasions, usually at the apartment of Kenny Shapiro, a Philadelphia wheeler-dealer and Atlantic City real estate developer who would be described by the New Jersey State Commission of Investigation as a Scarfo mob "financier". Matthews also sought funding for his mayoral campaign from Shapiro. Shapiro often talked to Leonetti about Matthews' campaign, telling Leonetti about the campaign expenses that he was paying for, such as advertising, signs, handouts, bands, as well as personal and entertainment costs for Matthews. He complained more than once about how much money it was costing him and that Matthews was wasting money on personal expenses.

Matthews, whose mother was Italian, had the support of the city's Jewish, Irish and Italian voters. He was elected Mayor of Atlantic City a couple of months before Scarfo went to federal prison in August 1982 on his firearms conviction. Shortly after Matthews was elected, Shapiro told Leonetti that he had funneled about $150,000 into Matthews' campaign. Scarfo and Leonetti had funneled money into Matthews' campaign to get zoning and planning approvals, variances and contracts for Scarfo, Inc. cement contracting company that was run by Leonetti.

=== Mayoralty ===
After voters changed the form of government to directly elect mayors in 1981, Matthews was elected mayor on June 15, 1982, over James L. Usry, a former school administrator. Matthews spent a fortune to get elected and then ran up enormous legal bills in a court battle over a recount.

Both the New Jersey State Police and the Federal Bureau of Investigation (FBI) set up surveillance of his Seatex office on Atlantic Avenue in Ventnor City, a chemical blending and packaging company that operated around the block, from Scarf Inc. Frank Lentino, a former Teamster who had become a labor organizer for Bartenders and Hotel Workers' Union Local 54 and Leonetti's conduit for Matthews, introduced him to James Biaco. Lentino and Biaco worked with Matthews to arrange the sale of a city-owned land zoned for casino development. Matthews was offered a hidden interest in the casino development that would follow his approval. Several different locations were used to meet with Matthews, including Shapiro's condominium at the Island House on Atlantic Avenue in Margate. Leonetti met with Matthews and others at Shapiro's condominium at least two different times. On one of those occasions, Leonetti met with Matthews, Shapiro, lawyer Robert Simone, and Stanley Branche. Simone was an associate of the Scarfo family and an attorney who represented Scarfo and Leonetti. Branche was a Philadelphia businessman who was friendly with Simone. Branche was at the meeting to obtain Matthews' support for a grand prix auto race in Atlantic City. Leonetti was there to get Matthews to push for the sale of some city-owned property that Leonetti thought, at the time, might financially benefit him, Scarfo and members and associates of the Scarfo family. As it turned out, the city-owned property was related to an FBI investigation that later resulted in the conviction of Matthews and Lentino.

On another occasion, Leonetti met with Matthews, Shapiro and a Scarfo family associate named Arthur "Artie" Pelullo. Leonetti arranged for the meeting because he wanted Pelullo to apologize to Matthews for threatening him. During 1982 or 1983, when the Scarfo family was involved with Matthews, Pelullo asked Matthews to help him get some type of license so that his limousine company could operate in Atlantic City. When Pelullo was having trouble getting the license, he threatened to kill Matthews, who contacted Leonetti for help. Leonetti set up a meeting at Shapiro's condominium to settle the matter and made Pelullo apologize to Matthews. Leonetti also met Matthews at the Mars Restaurant, a bar and restaurant owned by Pelullo on South Street in Philadelphia.

=== Recall and imprisonment ===
Voters recalled Matthews in a March 13, 1984 referendum, shortly before he was indicted March 27, 1984, on federal extortion charges of using his office to extort bribes from businessmen to benefit himself and organized crime associates.

In the indictment, released by United States Attorney W. Hunt Dumont, Matthews was accused of having close dealings with Scarfo for years, dating to before he was mayor. Matthews allegedly turned a blind eye to the actions of his primary supporters Scarfo and Leonetti, joining them in shaking down others and concentrating on extorting money from city officials. In late 1983, a month or two before Scarfo was released from prison in January 1984, Leonetti found out that the FBI was investigating the illegal activities between the Scarfo family and Matthews. Leonetti learned about the investigation a day or two before it made the news. At first, Matthews decided to help the FBI and gave them a confession, but shortly thereafter decided against cooperating.

Matthews was charged with the attempted extortion of $668,000 from two businesses set up by the FBI and with taking $14,000 in bribes from an undercover agent posing as a representative of the companies. Matthews pleaded guilty to one count of extortion on November 27, 1984, four weeks after the trial started. By admitting to accepting a $10,000 bribe from an FBI agent posing as a businessman who wanted his help in buying a parcel of city-owned land zoned for casinos on favorable terms, the government dropped seven other counts. The dropped counts alleged further extortion, bribery and conspiracy, including one alleging that Matthews had conspired with organized crime figures to use his office for their benefit in return for campaign financing. Matthews was sentenced in 1985 to 15 years in federal prison, and was paroled in June 1990.

Lentino, an associate of the Scarfo family and business agent for Local 54 of the Bartenders and Hotel Workers' Union in Atlantic City and Teamsters Local 158 in Philadelphia, admitted, even after his retirement, to conspiring with Matthews and reputed organized crime leaders in return for the Mayor's aid in getting a city contract and in favorably purchasing city-owned land zoned for casinos.

Thomas Russo, then the city's director of the Department of Planning and Development, was acquitted April 13, 1985, on charges of conspiracy, extortion and attempted extortion in connection with allegations he accepted $8,000 in payoffs in connection with proposed land sales.

Usry succeeded Matthews as mayor after the recall election.

== Death ==
Matthews died at his home in Linwood, at the age of 79, on January 2, 2014.

Preceded by Joseph Lazarow	Mayor of Atlantic City; 1982–1984	Succeeded by James L. Usry
