= Atlantic County Board of County Commissioners =

Leadership
- Chairwoman: Maureen Kern (R)
- Vice Chairman: James A. Bertino (R)

Structure
- Seats: 9
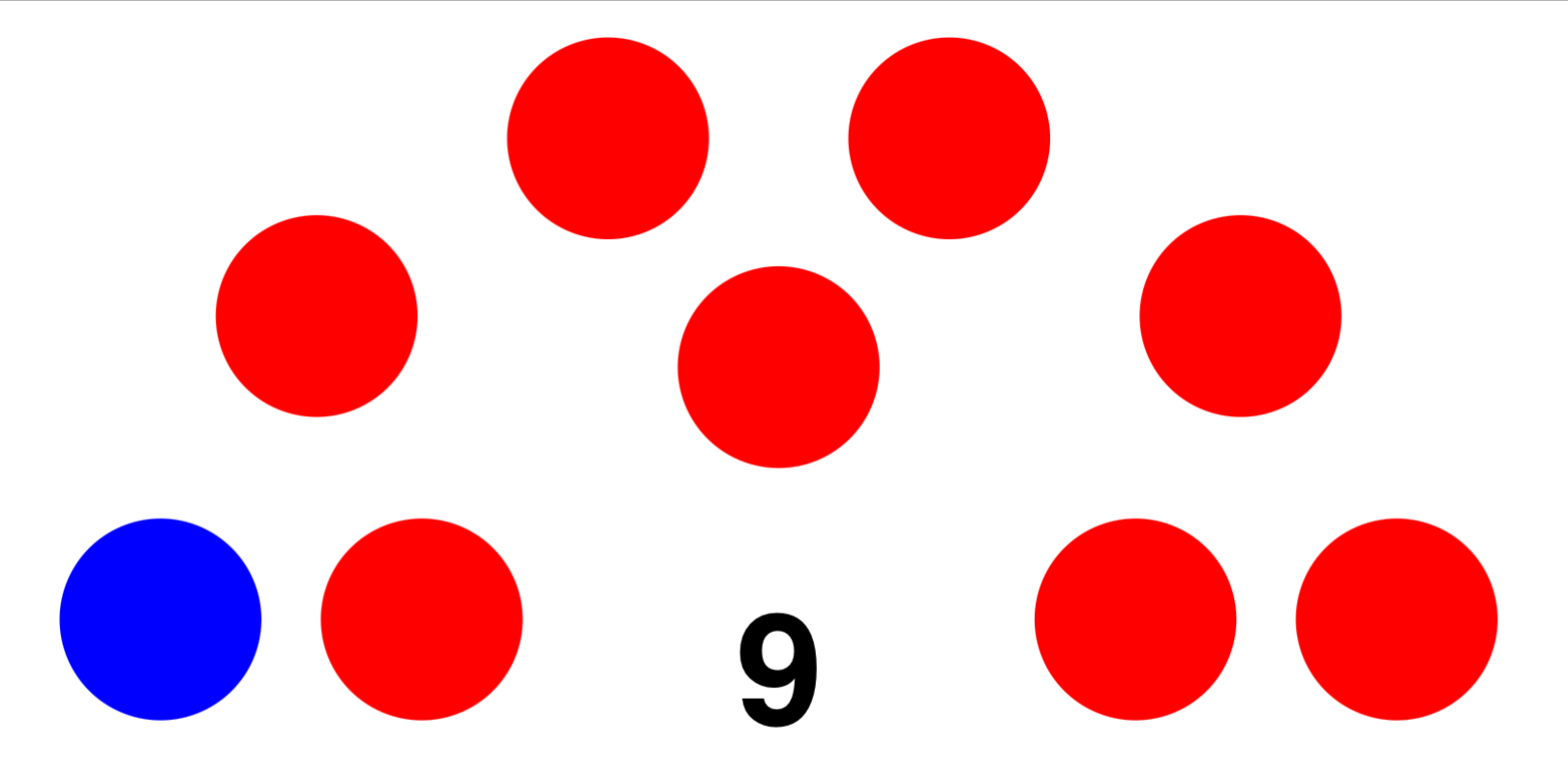
- Political groups: Republican Party (8); Democratic Party (1)
- Length of term: 3 years

Website
- Atlantic County Board of County Commissioners

The Atlantic County Board of County Commissioners is a body of nine people that govern Atlantic County, New Jersey alongside the county executive. The members of the board are referred to as commissioners. As of 2025, the board is composed of 8 Republicans and 1 Democrat.

The members of the board are elected in two different ways. Five of the members are elected from popular vote through districts. The last four are elected from an at-large popular vote. Atlantic County adopted the executive form of government. The commissioners create the laws of the county. Prior to 2021, the Board of County Commissioners was known as the Board of Chosen Freeholders.

== Districts ==
As of the 2020 redistricting process:

=== 1st District ===
Townships:

Atlantic City, Egg Harbor (part), Long Port, Margate, and Ventnor.

=== 2nd District ===
Townships:

Absecon, Egg Harbor (part), Linwood, Northfield, Somers Point, and Pleasantville.

=== 3rd District ===
Townships:

Egg Harbor (part) and Hamilton Township (part).

=== 4th District ===
Townships:

Brigantine, Galloway Township, Egg Harbor (part), and Port Republic.

=== 5th District ===
Townships:

Buena Borough, Buena Township, Corbin City, Egg Harbor City, Estell Manor, Folsom Borough, Hamilton Township, Hammonton, Mullica Township, Weymouth.

== Commissioners ==
Name	Party	Assumed office	District
Richard Dase	Republican	2008	4th
Michael Ruffu	Republican	2025	At-Large
James Bertino	Republican	2011	5th
June Byrnes	Republican	2024	At-Large
Ernest Coursey	Democrat	2014	1st
Maureen Kern	Republican	2016	2nd
Amy Gatto	Republican	2017	At-Large
Andrew W. Parker, III	Republican	2021	3rd
John W. Risley Jr.	Republican	2014	At-Large
