= Vince Mazzeo =

American politician

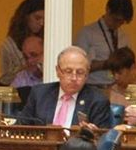

Member of the New Jersey General Assembly from the 2nd district
- In office January 14, 2014 – January 11, 2022 Serving with John Armato
- Preceded by: John Amodeo
- Succeeded by: Don Guardian; Claire Swift

Chair of the Assembly State and Local Government Committee
- In office January 9, 2018 – January 11, 2022
- Preceded by: Troy Singleton

Mayor of Northfield Township, New Jersey
- In office January 1, 2008 – January 14, 2014
- Preceded by: Frank Perri
- Succeeded by: Jerry McGee

Personal details
- Born: January 6, 1964 (age 62)
- Party: Democratic
- Spouse: Gerri Mazzeo
- Children: 2
- Education: Glassboro State College
- Website: Legislative Website

Vincent Mazzeo (born January 6, 1964) is an American Democratic Party politician who served in the New Jersey General Assembly from 2014 to 2022, representing the 2nd Legislative District.

== Early life ==
Mazzeo is part owner of B.F. Mazzeo, a grocery store. Prior to serving as mayor, Mazzeo served on the Northfield City Council from 2003 until 2007 and was the president of the council. He then served as Mayor from 2008-2014. He received a bachelor's degree from Glassboro State College (now Rowan University) and is married to Gerri. They have two children.

== New Jersey Assembly ==
In the 2013 elections, Mazzeo ran for a seat in the General Assembly and was declared the winner by 32 votes over Republican Party incumbent John F. Amodeo. Amodeo filed for a recount after Mazzeo had been declared the winner by a margin of 38 votes among the more than 100,000 ballots cast and conceded to Mazzeo shortly after a month-long process showed Mazzeo ahead by 51 votes. With Republican Chris A. Brown leaving the Assembly to run for Senate in the November 2017 general election, Mazzeo and his running mate, newcomer John Armato, defeated Republican challengers Vince Sera and Brenda Taube to win both Assembly seats from the district for the Democrats.

=== Tenure ===
Mazzeo has said he might challenge Chris A. Brown for New Jersey Senate in 2021.

== Electoral history ==
=== Assembly ===
2019 New Jersey General Assembly election for the 2nd Legislative District
Party	Candidate	Votes	%	±%
Democratic	Vince Mazzeo (Incumbent)	23,211	26.71%	▼1.85%
Democratic	John Armato (Incumbent)	21,895	25.19	▼1.39%
Republican	John W. Risley	20,906	24.05	▲1.85
Republican	Phil Guenther	20,905	24.05	▲1.39%
Total votes		86,717	100.0%	

2017 New Jersey General Assembly election for the 2nd Legislative District
Party	Candidate	Votes	%	±%
Democratic	Vince Mazzeo (Incumbent)	27,601	28.6	▲3.1
Democratic	John Armato	25,683	26.6	▲2.2
Republican	Vince Sera	20,814	21.5	▼5.0
Republican	Brenda Taube	20,611	21.3	▼2.3
Independent, Honest, Reliable	Heather Gordon	1,208	1.3	N/A
Green	Mico Lucide	718	0.7	N/A
Total votes		'96,635'	'100.0'	

2015 New Jersey General Assembly election for the 2nd Legislative District
Party	Candidate	Votes	%	±%
Republican	Chris Brown (Incumbent)	18,959	26.5	▲0.9
Democratic	Vincent Mazzeo (Incumbent)	18,279	25.5	▲0.7
Democratic	Colin Bell	17,433	24.4	▲0.9
Republican	Will Pauls	16,907	23.6	▼1.1
Total votes		'71,578'	'100.0'	

2013 New Jersey General Assembly election for the 2nd Legislative District
Party	Candidate	Votes	%	±%
Republican	Chris Brown (Incumbent)	26,022	25.6	▼1.5
Democratic	Vincent Mazzeo	25,182	24.77	▲1.8
Republican	John F. Amodeo (Incumbent)	25,131	24.72	▼4.5
Democratic	Nick Russo	23,921	23.5	▲2.8
Brownie Plus Me	Gary Stein	1,394	1.4	N/A
Total votes		'101,650'	'100.0'	

New Jersey General Assembly
Preceded by John F. Amodeo	Member of the New Jersey General Assembly for the 2nd District; January 14, 2014 – January 11, 2022; With: Chris A. Brown, John Armato	Succeeded by Don Guardian; Claire Swift
