= Paul D'Amato =

American gangster and club owner (1908–1984)

Paul "Skinny" D'Amato
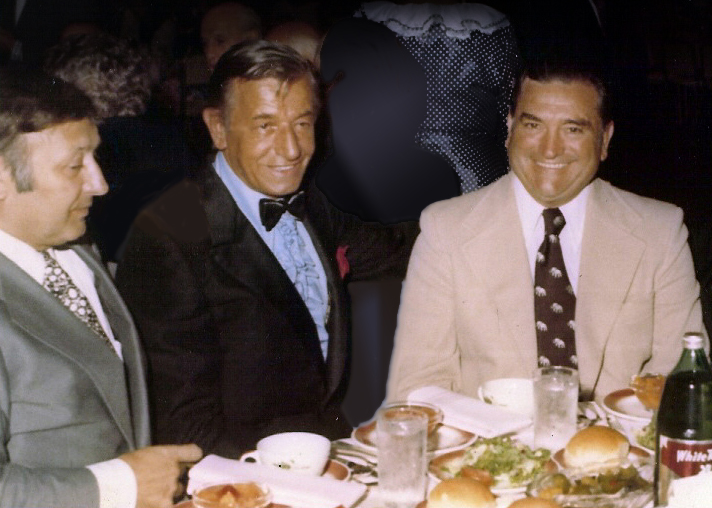
- D'Amato (center) with the Chairman of the Committee to Legalize Gaming Mike Segal (left) and Representative Charles Sandman (right) in 1973.
- Born: Paul Richard D'Amato; December 1, 1908; Atlantic City, New Jersey, U.S.
- Died: June 5, 1984 (aged 75); Atlantic City, New Jersey, U.S.
- Resting place: Holy Cross Cemetery and Chapel Mausoleum
- Other names: Skinny, Mr. Atlantic City, Uncle Paul
- Occupations: Restaurant and nightclub owner
- Spouse: Betty Jane Creamer (m. 1949; died 1972)
- Children: 2

Paul Richard "Skinny" D'Amato (December 1, 1908 – June 5, 1984) also known as "Mr. Atlantic City", was the owner of the 500 Club in Atlantic City, New Jersey, from the 1940s until the club burned down in 1973.

== Early life ==
Paul Richard D'Amato was born to Italian American parents in 1908 in Atlantic City, New Jersey. He was one of eight children. When one or both of their parents died, D'Amato opened a cigar store at the age of 15 to help support the other seven children. The store was very successful.

== Career ==
D'Amato's initial success in Atlantic City began to grow when he opened up a restaurant and gambling hall called "Luigi's". He put the famous 500 Club under his ownership. He began working for corrupt Atlantic County treasurer Enoch "Nucky" Johnson and his political organization. D'Amato was also an associate of Chicago Outfit boss Sam Giancana and New Orleans crime family boss Carlos Marcello.

Philadelphia crime family underboss Marco Reginelli, a leader in the Italian Philadelphia-South Jersey mob for years, allegedly sold the 500 Club to D’Amato.

=== The 500 Club ===
The 500 Club was allegedly a front for an illegal gambling operation. To draw gamblers, he had big-name entertainers such as Frank Sinatra, Sammy Davis, Dean Martin and Jerry Lewis perform at the club.

He also managed a club in Lake Tahoe for Sinatra, for which he got troubles from the IRS and lost a lot of money when the casino commission linked Giancana to the Lake Tahoe operation and revoked its license in 1963. Mr. D'Amato was never convicted of a crime, and never spent a day in prison.

Soon Atlantic City began to decline and the 500 Club, once the most popular nightclub in the nation, along with it. Skinny's wife suffered medical problems for five years and died in 1972. In June 1973, The 500 Club burned to the ground. Skinny, with scant insurance, lost about $2 million on the fire. He never recovered — financially, emotionally or spiritually. D'Amato also owned 13% of the Cal Neva Lodge and Casino in Crystal Bay, Nevada. Giancana was also a silent partner in the resort, in which D'Amato also acted as Giancana's representative.

== Personal life and death ==
D'Amato married Betty Jane Creamer on June 4, 1949. The couple had two children and remained married until Creamer's death in 1972. In 1976, their son Angelo was charged with the murder of a co-worker at the D'Amato home in Ventnor. After his release from prison, Angelo was sentenced to 25-years-to-life in prison on October 7, 1983, for the murder of 28-year-old Keerans Carter in 1981. He was also the uncle and namesake of Paul D'Amato, a New Jersey lawyer and Republican politician.

D'Amato died on June 5, 1984, of a heart attack. His longtime close friend, entertainer Frank Sinatra, served as a pallbearer at his funeral. He is buried at Holy Cross Cemetery and Chapel Mausoleum in Mays Landing.

== In popular culture ==
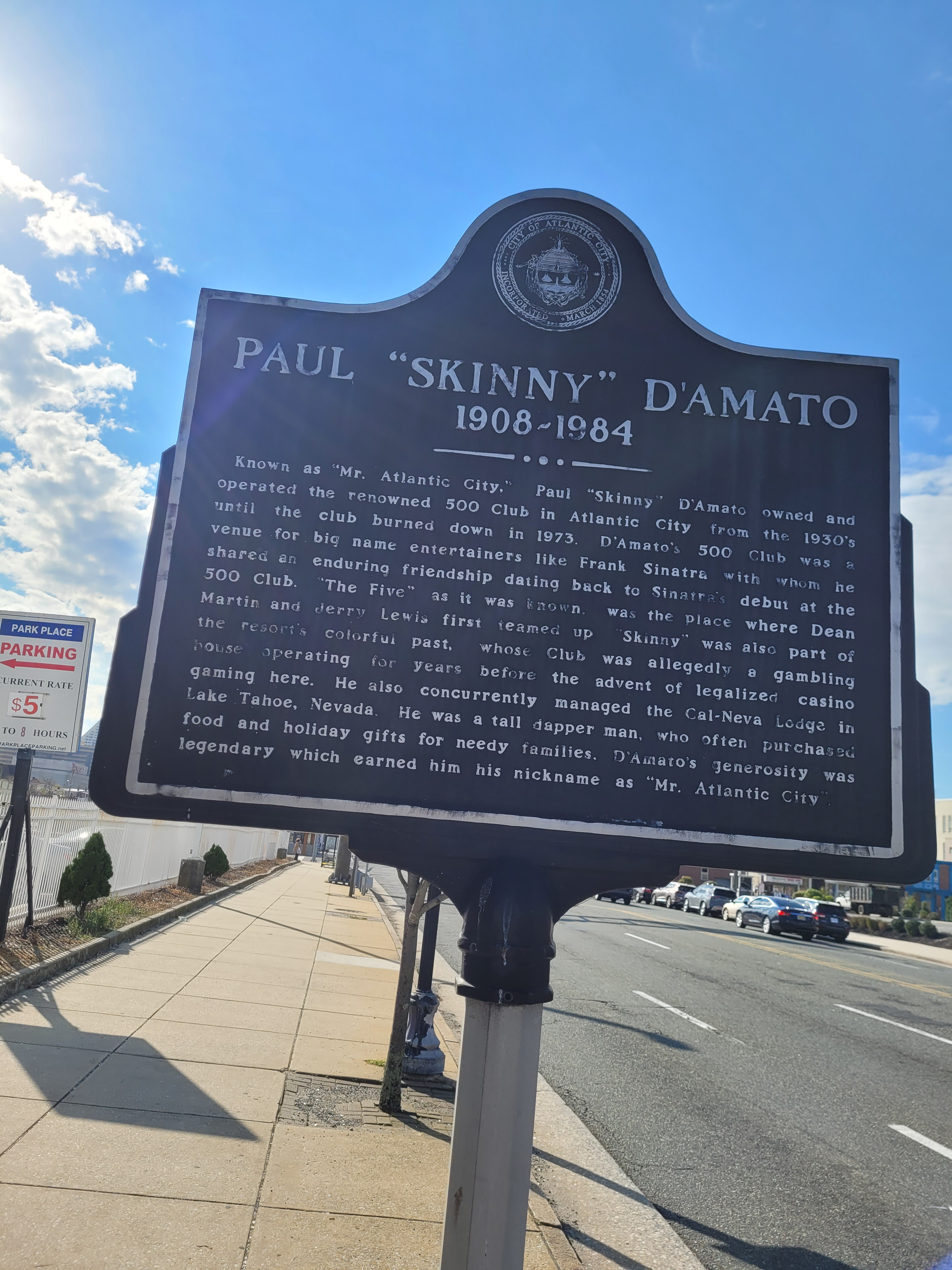
A plaque in Atlantic City providing historical context on D'Amato

D'Amato is portrayed by Robert Morelli in the television biopic about Dean Martin and Jerry Lewis, titled Martin and Lewis (2002).
