= Francis J. Blee =

American politician

Member of the New Jersey General Assembly from the 2nd district
- In office September 18, 1995 – January 8, 2008 Serving with Tom Foley, Kenneth LeFevre, Paul D'Amato, Kirk W. Conover and Jim Whelan
- Preceded by: John F. Gaffney
- Succeeded by: John F. Amodeo; Vincent J. Polistina

Personal details
- Born: May 29, 1958 (age 68)
- Party: Republican

Francis J. "Frank" Blee (born May 29, 1958) is an American Republican Party politician, who served in the New Jersey General Assembly from 1995 to 2008, where he represented the 2nd legislative district. Blee was appointed in 1995 to fill the unexpired term of the John F. Gaffney, who had died in office.

Blee was the Republican Whip in the Assembly from 2002 to 2008. He served in the Assembly on the Budget Committee, the Tourism Committee and on the Legislative Services Commission.

Blee sponsored legislation which established the nation's first statewide screening and education program for the Hepatitis C virus. This bill was signed into law by Governor of New Jersey Christine Whitman in 1998. Blee also sponsored legislation establishing a 15-member Drug Utilization Review Board which has review authority with respect to the Medicaid program, New Jersey's Pharmaceutical Assistance to the Aged and Disabled (PAAD) program, the AIDS drug distribution program and any other State and federally funded pharmaceutical benefits program. The board reviews and evaluates these pharmaceutical benefit programs to make certain they are operating efficiently. Assemblyman Blee sponsored the "Senior Gold Prescription Drug Discount Act" which significantly increases the income eligibility level for Seniors to qualify for prescription drug coverage, allowing over 100,000 previously ineligible seniors to participate in this program.

Blee served on the Absecon City Council from 1991–1995, serving as Absecon's youngest ever Council President from 1992-1993.

Blee graduated with a B.A. from Dickinson College in Political Science and received a D.C. from Life Chiropractic College (now known as Life University). He is a resident of Absecon.

Currently, Blee is an adjunct professor at Stockton University, teaching a course in Public Policy.
