= Northfield, New Jersey =

City in Atlantic County, New Jersey, US

- City
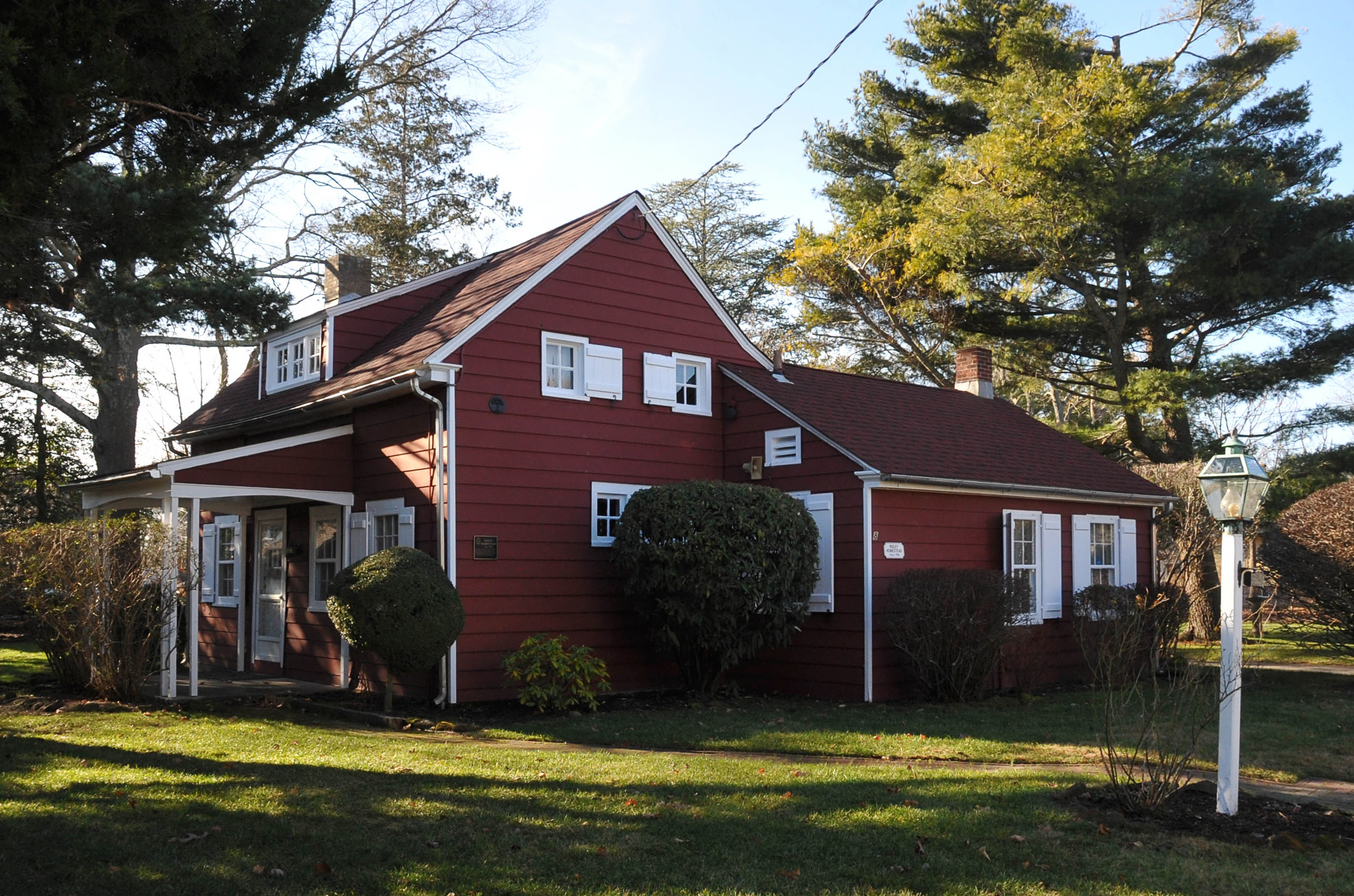
- Risley House

- Seal
- Nickname: "Gateway to the Shore"
- Map of Northfield in Atlantic County. Inset: Location of Atlantic County highlighted in the State of New Jersey.

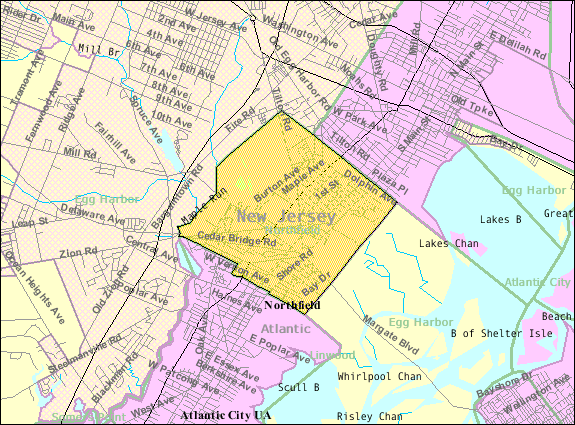
- Census Bureau map of Northfield, New Jersey

- Location in Atlantic County Location in New Jersey Location in the United States
- Coordinates: 39.373073°N 74.554128°W
- Country: United States
- State: New Jersey
- County: Atlantic
- Incorporated: March 21, 1905

Government
  - Type: City
  - Body: City Council
  - Mayor: Erland Chau (R, term ends December 31, 2023)
  - Municipal clerk: Mary Canesi

Area
  - Total: 3.62 sq mi (9.37 km^{2})
  - Land: 3.58 sq mi (9.28 km^{2})
  - Water: 0.035 sq mi (0.09 km^{2}) 0.97%
  - Rank: 310th of 565 in state 20th of 23 in county
- Elevation: 23 ft (7.0 m)

Population (2020)
  - Total: 8,434
  - Estimate (2023): 8,426
  - Rank: 281st of 565 in state 10th of 23 in county
  - Density: 2,354.6/sq mi (909.1/km^{2})
  - Rank: 262nd of 565 in state 6th of 23 in county
- Time zone: UTC−05:00 (Eastern (EST))
  - Summer (DST): UTC−04:00 (Eastern (EDT))
- ZIP Code: 08225
- Area code: 609
- FIPS code: 3400152950
- GNIS feature ID: 0885324
- Website: www.cityofnorthfield.org

Northfield is a city in Atlantic County, in the U.S. state of New Jersey. As of the 2020 United States census, the city's population was 8,434, a decrease of 190 (−2.2%) from the 2010 census count of 8,624, which in turn reflected an increase of 899 (+11.6%) from the 7,725 counted in the 2000 census.

Northfield was founded by Jeremiah Leeds; he has a gravestone at Oxford Circle, but it is not certain that he was buried there. Northfield was incorporated as a city by an act of the New Jersey Legislature on March 21, 1905, from portions of Egg Harbor Township. A portion of Egg Harbor Township was transferred to Northfield in 1931, and then reverted to Egg Harbor Township in 1933.

The city calls itself the "Gateway to the Shore", just over the bridge from the beaches, and is located about 7 miles (11 km) west of Atlantic City, bordering the municipalities of Pleasantville, Egg Harbor Township and Linwood. Geographically, the city, and all of Atlantic County, is part of the South Jersey region of the state and of the Atlantic City-Hammonton metropolitan statistical area, which in turn is included in the Philadelphia metropolitan area.

== Geography ==
According to the United States Census Bureau, the city had a total area of 3.62 square miles (9.37 km^{2}), including 3.58 square miles (9.28 km^{2}) of land and 0.04 square miles (0.09 km^{2}) of water (0.97%).

Unincorporated communities, localities and place names located partially or completely within the city include Bakersville and Dolphin.

The borough borders the Atlantic County municipalities of Egg Harbor Township, Linwood and Pleasantville.

== Demographics ==
Historical population
Census	Pop.	Note	%±
1910	866		—
1920	1,127		30.1%
1930	2,804		148.8%
1940	2,848		1.6%
1950	3,498		22.8%
1960	5,849		67.2%
1970	8,646		47.8%
1980	7,795		−9.8%
1990	7,305		−6.3%
2000	7,725		5.7%
2010	8,624		11.6%
2020	8,434		−2.2%
2023 (est.)	8,426		−0.1%
Population sources: 1900–2000; 1900–1920 1910 1910–1930; 1940–2000 2000; 2010 2020

=== 2020 census ===
As of the 2020 census, Northfield had a population of 8,434. The median age was 44.8 years. 21.6% of residents were under the age of 18 and 18.7% of residents were 65 years of age or older. For every 100 females there were 90.9 males, and for every 100 females age 18 and over there were 87.2 males age 18 and over.

99.7% of residents lived in urban areas, while 0.3% lived in rural areas.

There were 3,116 households in Northfield, of which 33.0% had children under the age of 18 living in them. Of all households, 52.2% were married-couple households, 14.3% were households with a male householder and no spouse or partner present, and 27.2% were households with a female householder and no spouse or partner present. About 22.6% of all households were made up of individuals and 12.0% had someone living alone who was 65 years of age or older.

There were 3,309 housing units, of which 5.8% were vacant. The homeowner vacancy rate was 1.9% and the rental vacancy rate was 4.8%.

Racial composition as of the 2020 census
Race	Number	Percent
White	6,669	79.1%
Black or African American	210	2.5%
American Indian and Alaska Native	21	0.2%
Asian	467	5.5%
Native Hawaiian and Other Pacific Islander	8	0.1%
Some other race	447	5.3%
Two or more races	612	7.3%
Hispanic or Latino (of any race)	974	11.5%

=== 2010 census ===
The 2010 United States census counted 8,624 people, 3,152 households, and 2,301 families in the city. The population density was 2,533.7 per square mile (978.3/km^{2}). There were 3,260 housing units at an average density of 957.8 per square mile (369.8/km^{2}). The racial makeup was 87.14% (7,515) White, 3.24% (279) Black or African American, 0.19% (16) Native American, 4.50% (388) Asian, 0.01% (1) Pacific Islander, 2.89% (249) from other races, and 2.04% (176) from two or more races. Hispanic or Latino of any race were 8.00% (690) of the population.

Of the 3,152 households, 34.7% had children under the age of 18; 55.2% were married couples living together; 13.1% had a female householder with no husband present and 27.0% were non-families. Of all households, 22.1% were made up of individuals and 11.5% had someone living alone who was 65 years of age or older. The average household size was 2.68 and the average family size was 3.15.

24.2% of the population were under the age of 18, 7.1% from 18 to 24, 21.3% from 25 to 44, 31.3% from 45 to 64, and 16.1% who were 65 years of age or older. The median age was 43.1 years. For every 100 females, the population had 91.2 males. For every 100 females ages 18 and older there were 87.0 males.

The Census Bureau's 2006–2010 American Community Survey showed that (in 2010 inflation-adjusted dollars) median household income was $70,980 (with a margin of error of +/− $5,377) and the median family income was $78,727 (+/− $5,763). Males had a median income of $57,027 (+/− $4,611) versus $45,757 (+/− $6,595) for females. The per capita income for the city was $30,675 (+/− $2,461). About 2.5% of families and 3.2% of the population were below the poverty line, including 3.8% of those under age 18 and 5.9% of those age 65 or over.

=== 2000 census ===
As of the 2000 United States census there were 7,725 people, 2,824 households, and 2,109 families residing in the city. The population density was 2,254.9 inhabitants per square mile (870.6/km^{2}). There were 2,922 housing units at an average density of 852.9 per square mile (329.3/km^{2}). The racial makeup of the city was 91.52% White, 2.65% African American, 0.10% Native American, 2.50% Asian, 0.08% Pacific Islander, 1.81% from other races, and 1.33% from two or more races. Hispanic or Latino of any race were 4.38% of the population.

There were 2,824 households, out of which 35.0% had children under the age of 18 living with them, 59.6% were married couples living together, 11.3% had a female householder with no husband present, and 25.3% were non-families. 21.1% of all households were made up of individuals, and 10.1% had someone living alone who was 65 years of age or older. The average household size was 2.66 and the average family size was 3.11.

In the city the age distribution of the population shows 25.5% under the age of 18, 4.4% from 18 to 24, 29.6% from 25 to 44, 22.7% from 45 to 64, and 17.8% who were 65 years of age or older. The median age was 40 years. For every 100 females, there were 90.9 males. For every 100 females age 18 and over, there were 85.6 males.

The median income for a household in the city was $56,875, and the median income for a family was $62,896. Males had a median income of $43,227 versus $30,227 for females. The per capita income for the city was $25,059. About 4.4% of families and 5.6% of the population were below the poverty line, including 5.5% of those under age 18 and 10.8% of those age 65 or over.

== Parks and recreation ==
Northfield is home to Birch Grove Park, which covers 271 acres (110 ha) of heavily wooded land dotted with stocked fresh water fishing lakes. Birch Grove Park features over 50 campsites, exercise and nature trails, a bandstand and an extensive children's playground.

Northfield features a large bird sanctuary, dedicated to remaining open space in perpetuity.

== Government ==
=== Local government ===
Northfield operates under the City form of New Jersey municipal government, which is used in 15 municipalities (of the 564) statewide. Under this form of government, the council functions as a legislative body: it passes ordinances and approves the appointments of the mayor. The mayor, as executive, is responsible for administrative functions and appointment of all officials. The governing body is comprised of a mayor and a city council who are chosen in partisan elections held as part of the November general election. The mayor serves a four-year term of office. The City Council includes seven members, with one member elected at-large to a four-year term in office and six who are elected from wards to three-year terms on a staggered basis with two seats up for election each year.

As of 2023, the Mayor of Northfield is Republican Erland V.L. Chau, whose term of office ends December 31, 2023. Members of the City Council are Council President Tom Polistina (R, 2023; 2nd Ward), Carolyn Bucci (R, 2024; 2nd Ward), Renee Carfagno (R, 2025; 1st Ward), Gregory Dewees (R, 2025; At Large), Eric Leeds (R, 2025; 2nd Ward), David Notaro (R, 2023; 1st Ward) and Brian L. Smith (R, 2024; 1st Ward).

After Gregory Dewees took office in January 2022 in the At Large seat, the City Council appointed Eric Leeds to fill the Second Ward seat expiring in December 2022 that Dewees had previously held.

In the November 2014 general election, Republican Erland Chau was chosen to fill the balance of the mayoral seat expiring December 31, 2015. Jerry McGee had been appointed by the council in February 2014 to fill the seat on an interim basis after Democrat Vince Mazzeo had resigned to take a seat in the New Jersey General Assembly. The city council chose Jeff Lischin in December 2014 to fill the vacant council seat of Erland Chau expiring in December 2016. Lischin will serve on an interim basis until the November 2015 general election, at which time the voters will select a candidate to serve the balance of the unexpired term. In November 2015, Lischin was elected to serve the balance of the term.

=== Federal, state and county representation ===
Northfield is located in the 2nd Congressional District and is part of New Jersey's 2nd state legislative district.

For the 119th United States Congress, New Jersey's 2nd congressional district is represented by Jeff Van Drew (R, Dennis Township). New Jersey is represented in the United States Senate by Democrats Cory Booker (Newark, term ends 2027) and Andy Kim (Moorestown, term ends 2031).

For the 2026–2027 session, the 2nd legislative district of the New Jersey Legislature is represented in the New Jersey Senate by Vincent J. Polistina (R, Egg Harbor Township) and in the General Assembly by Don Guardian (R, Atlantic City) and Maureen Rowan (D, Atlantic City).

Atlantic County is governed by a directly elected county executive and a nine-member Board of County Commissioners, responsible for legislation. The executive serves a four-year term and the commissioners are elected to staggered three-year terms, of which four are elected from the county on an at-large basis and five of the commissioners represent equally populated districts. As of 2025, Atlantic County's Executive is Dennis Levinson (R, Northfield), whose term of office ends December 31, 2027. Members of the Board of County Commissioners are:

Ernest D. Coursey (D, District 1-- Atlantic City, Egg Harbor Township (part), Longport, Margate City, and Ventnor City; 2025, Atlantic City), Chair Maureen Kern (R, District 2-- Egg Harbor Township (part), Linwood, Northfield, Somers Point and Pleasantville; 2027, Somers Point), Andrew Parker III (R, District 3-- Egg Harbor Township (part) and Hamilton Township (part); 2026, Egg Harbor Township), Richard R. Dase (R, District 4, including Brigantine, Galloway Township, Egg Harbor Township (part), and Port Republic; 2025, Galloway Township), Vice Chair James A. Bertino (R, District 5-- Buena, Buena Vista Township, Corbin City, Egg Harbor City, Estell Manor, Folsom, Hamilton Township (part), Hammonton, Mullica Township and Weymouth Township; 2027, Hammonton), June Byrnes (R, At-Large; 2026, Linwood), Michael Ruffu (R, At-Large; Margate, 2027) Amy L. Gatto (R, At-large; 2025, Hamilton Township) and John W. Risley (R, At-Large; 2026, Egg Harbor Township)

Atlantic County's constitutional officers are: Clerk Joesph J. Giralo (R, 2026, Hammonton), Sheriff Joe O'Donoghue (R, 2026, Egg Harbor Township) and Surrogate James Curcio (R, 2025, Hammonton).

=== Politics ===
As of March 2011, there were a total of 5,610 registered voters in Northfield Township, of which 1,331 (23.7% vs. 30.5% countywide) were registered as Democrats, 1,801 (32.1% vs. 25.2%) were registered as Republicans and 2,473 (44.1% vs. 44.3%) were registered as Unaffiliated. There were 5 voters registered as Libertarians or Greens. Among the township's 2010 Census population, 65.1% (vs. 58.8% in Atlantic County) were registered to vote, including 85.9% of those ages 18 and over (vs. 76.6% countywide).

Gubernatorial election results for Northfield
Year	Republican		Democratic		Third party(ies)	
Year	No.	%	No.	%	No.	%
2025	1,914	49.90%	1,900	49.53%	22	0.57%
2021	1,855	56.33%	1,407	42.73%	31	0.94%
2017	1,048	42.93%	1,329	54.44%	64	2.62%
2013	1,877	65.49%	950	33.15%	39	1.36%
2009	1,662	51.41%	1,352	41.82%	219	6.77%
2005	1,257	47.15%	1,316	49.36%	93	3.49%

In the 2012 presidential election, Democrat Barack Obama received 2,077 votes (49.3% vs. 57.9% countywide), ahead of Republican Mitt Romney with 2,059 votes (48.9% vs. 41.1%) and other candidates with 40 votes (0.9% vs. 0.9%), among the 4,214 ballots cast by the township's 5,923 registered voters, for a turnout of 71.1% (vs. 65.8% in Atlantic County). In the 2008 presidential election, Republican John McCain received 2,244 votes (49.7% vs. 41.6% countywide), ahead of Democrat Barack Obama with 2,187 votes (48.5% vs. 56.5%) and other candidates with 44 votes (1.0% vs. 1.1%), among the 4,512 ballots cast by the township's 5,879 registered voters, for a turnout of 76.7% (vs. 68.1% in Atlantic County). In the 2004 presidential election, Republican George W. Bush received 2,239 votes (52.6% vs. 46.2% countywide), ahead of Democrat John Kerry with 1,940 votes (45.6% vs. 52.0%) and other candidates with 40 votes (0.9% vs. 0.8%), among the 4,253 ballots cast by the township's 5,296 registered voters, for a turnout of 80.3% (vs. 69.8% in the whole county).

Presidential elections results
Year	Republican	Democratic	Third Parties
2024	53.7% 2,651	44.7% 2,187	1.6% 77
2020	50.0% 2,600	48.7% 2,530	1.3% 66
2016	50.7% 2,011	44.2% 1,756	5.1% 202
2012	48.9% 2,059	49.3% 2,077	0.9% 40
2008	49.7% 2,234	48.5% 2,187	1.0% 44
2004	52.6% 2,239	45.6% 1,940	0.9% 40

In the 2013 gubernatorial election, Republican Chris Christie received 1,877 votes (63.2% vs. 60.0% countywide), ahead of Democrat Barbara Buono with 950 votes (32.0% vs. 34.9%) and other candidates with 39 votes (1.3% vs. 1.3%), among the 2,971 ballots cast by the township's 5,981 registered voters, yielding a 49.7% turnout (vs. 41.5% in the county). In the 2009 gubernatorial election, Republican Chris Christie received 1,662 votes (50.7% vs. 47.7% countywide), ahead of Democrat Jon Corzine with 1,352 votes (41.2% vs. 44.5%), Independent Chris Daggett with 183 votes (5.6% vs. 4.8%) and other candidates with 36 votes (1.1% vs. 1.2%), among the 3,281 ballots cast by the township's 5,742 registered voters, yielding a 57.1% turnout (vs. 44.9% in the county).

United States Senate election results for Northfield1
Year	Republican		Democratic		Third party(ies)	
Year	No.	%	No.	%	No.	%
2024	2,534	53.51%	2,131	45.00%	71	1.50%
2018	1,697	54.58%	1,301	41.85%	111	3.57%
2012	1,902	48.27%	1,976	50.15%	62	1.57%
2006	1,492	51.36%	1,336	45.99%	77	2.65%

United States Senate election results for Northfield2
Year	Republican		Democratic		Third party(ies)	
Year	No.	%	No.	%	No.	%
2020	2,511	49.74%	2,452	48.57%	85	1.68%
2014	1,291	50.93%	1,195	47.14%	49	1.93%
2013	784	55.76%	602	42.82%	20	1.42%
2008	2,107	50.02%	2,054	48.77%	51	1.21%

== Education ==
Students in public school for pre-kindergarten through eighth grade are served by the Northfield Community Schools. As of the 2023–24 school year, the district, comprised of two schools, had an enrollment of 947 students and 91.5 classroom teachers (on an FTE basis), for a student–teacher ratio of 10.4:1. Schools in the district (with 2023–24 enrollment data from the National Center for Education Statistics) are Northfield Preschool, Primary and Elementary School with 451 students in grades PreK–4 and Northfield Community Middle School with 394 students in grades 5–8.

Students in ninth through twelfth grades attend Mainland Regional High School, which serves students from Linwood, Northfield and Somers Point. The high school is located in Linwood. For the 1997–98 school year, Mainland Regional High School was recognized by the United States Department of Education as a National Blue Ribbon School. As of the 2023–24 school year, the high school had an enrollment of 1,171 students and 106.2 classroom teachers (on an FTE basis), for a student–teacher ratio of 11.0:1. Seats on the high school district's nine-member board of education are allocated based on population, with three seats assigned to Northfield.

City public school students are also eligible to attend the Atlantic County Institute of Technology in the Mays Landing section of Hamilton Township or the Charter-Tech High School for the Performing Arts, located in Somers Point. Students may also attend Holy Spirit High School, a Christian high school located in Abescon, New Jersey.

Holy Family Regional School in Ventnor, a K–8 school of the Roman Catholic Diocese of Camden, was co-sponsored by St. Gianna Beretta Church of Northfield. After three years of operation, the archdiocese closed the school in the face of declining enrollment and increasing deficits.

== Transportation ==
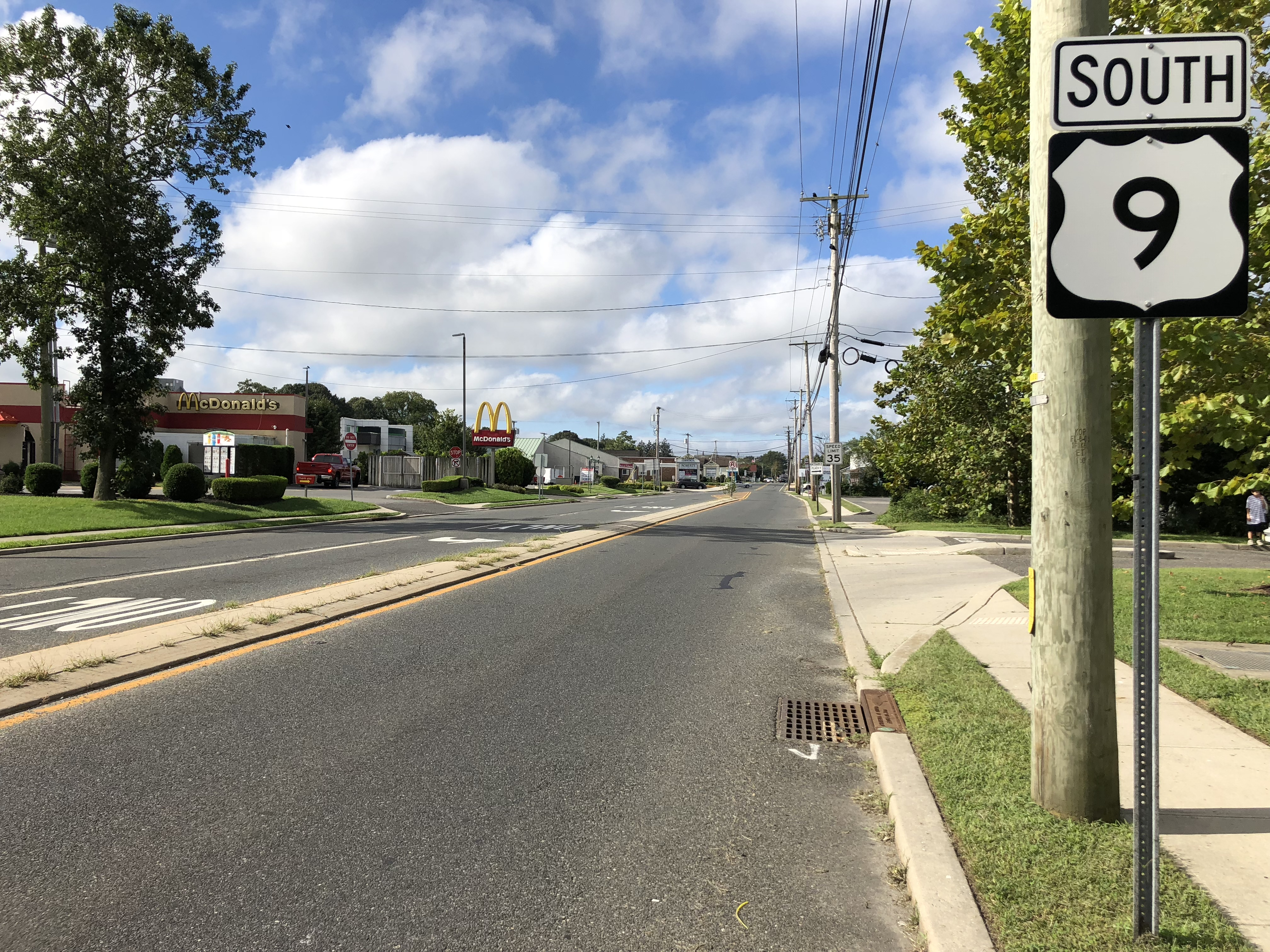
U.S. Route 9 southbound in Northfield

=== Roads and highways ===
As of May 2010, the city had a total of 46.41 miles (74.69 km) of roadways, of which 36.07 miles (58.05 km) were maintained by the municipality, 8.43 miles (13.57 km) by Atlantic County and 1.91 miles (3.07 km) by the New Jersey Department of Transportation.

U.S. Route 9 is the main highway directly serving Northfield, running south into Linwood and north into Pleasantville. Several major highways are accessible just outside the city, including the Garden State Parkway and the Atlantic City Expressway. These major highways provide connections to New York City, Philadelphia and Cape May.

=== Public transportation ===
NJ Transit offers bus transportation in the city between Ocean City and Atlantic City on the 507 and 509 routes.

== Notable people ==
People who were born in, residents of, or otherwise closely associated with Northfield include:

- A. R. Ammons (1926–2001), author and poet, winner of the National Book Award
- Art Blakey (1919–1990), jazz drummer and bandleader
- Vince Mazzeo (born 1964), politician who served in the New Jersey General Assembly from 2014 to 2022, before which he had served as the mayor of Northfield from 2008 through 2014
- Evelyn Nesbit (1884–1967), chorus girl, noted for her entanglement in the murder of her ex-lover, architect Stanford White, by her first husband, Harry K. Thaw
- Walter Fifield Snyder (1912–1993), scholar of ancient history
- Madhavi Sunder, professor at Georgetown University Law Center known for her work on intellectual property, law and technology, women's human rights, and international development
