= Brigantine, New Jersey =

City in Atlantic County, New Jersey, US

- City
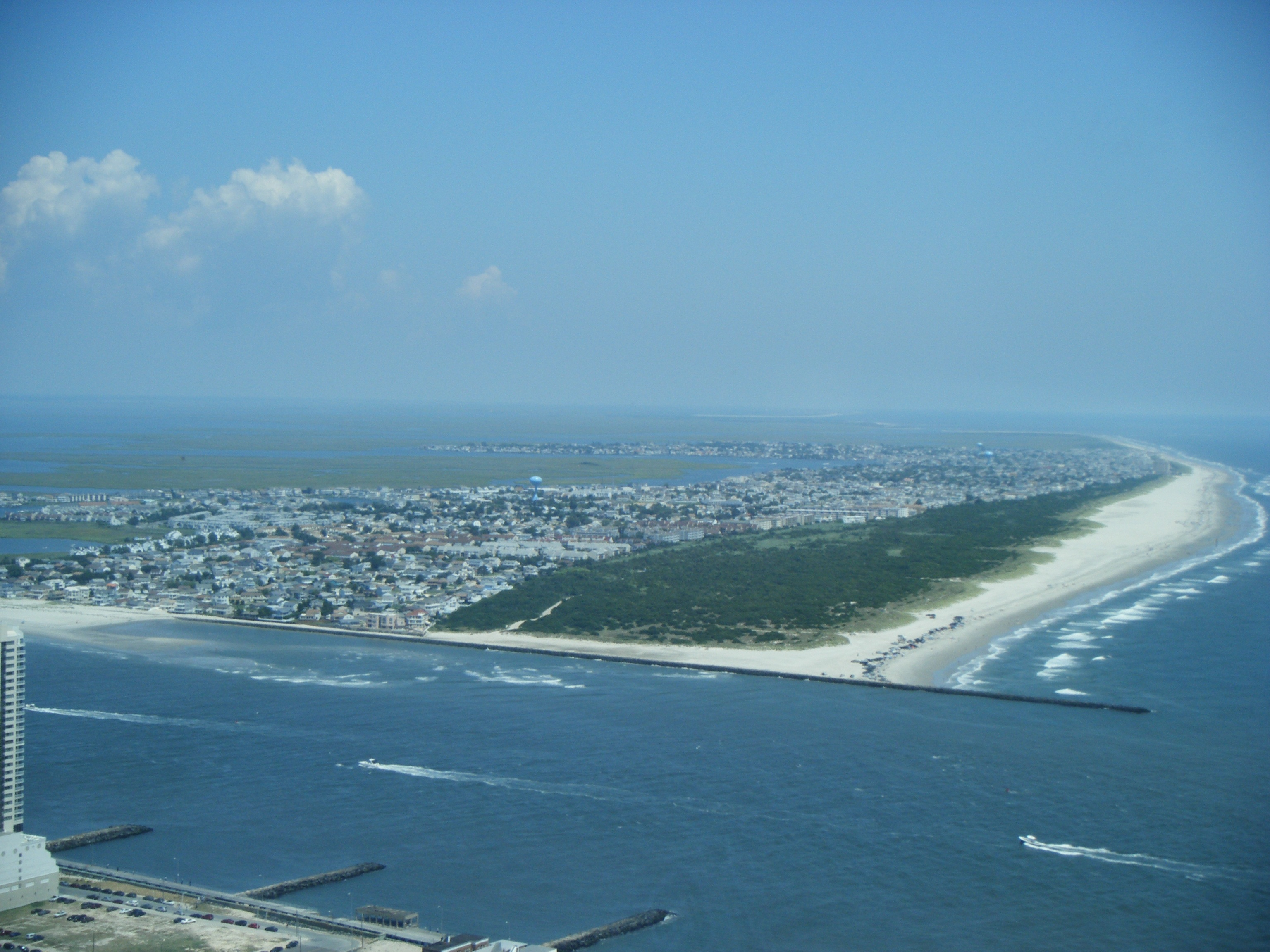
- View of Brigantine from Ocean Casino Resort

- Seal
- Motto: "An island you'll love for life!"
- Location of Brigantine in Atlantic County highlighted in red (left). Inset map: Location of Atlantic County in New Jersey highlighted in orange (right).

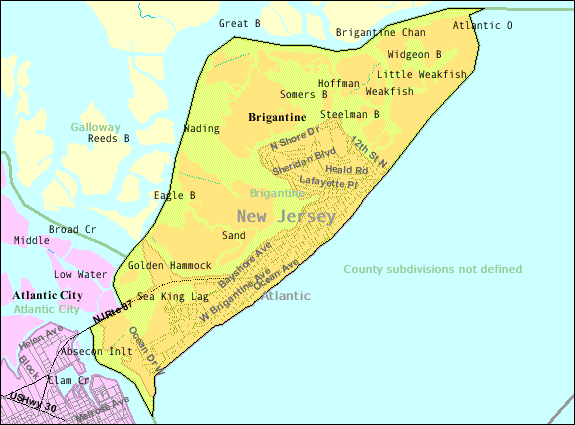
- Census Bureau map of Brigantine, New Jersey

- Location in Atlantic County Location in New Jersey Location in the United States
- Coordinates: 39°24′36″N 74°21′54″W
- Country: United States
- State: New Jersey
- County: Atlantic
- European discovery: September 2, 1608
- Incorporated: June 14, 1890
- Named after: Wrecks of brigantines

Government
  - Type: Faulkner Act (council–manager)
  - Body: City Council
  - Mayor: Vince Sera (R, term ends December 31, 2026)
  - Manager: Tige Platt
  - Municipal clerk: Christine Murray
  - Chief of police: Richard Casamento

Area
  - Total: 10.86 sq mi (28.14 km^{2})
  - Land: 6.52 sq mi (16.89 km^{2})
  - Water: 4.34 sq mi (11.24 km^{2}) 39.98%
  - Rank: 203rd of 565 in state 11th of 23 in county
- Elevation: 0 ft (0 m)

Population (2020)
  - Total: 7,716
  - Estimate (2023): 7,602
  - Rank: 302nd of 565 in state 11th of 23 in county
  - Density: 1,183.1/sq mi (456.8/km^{2})
  - Rank: 363rd of 565 in state 10th of 23 in county
- Time zone: UTC−05:00 (Eastern (EST))
  - Summer (DST): UTC−04:00 (Eastern (EDT))
- ZIP Code: 08203
- Area code: 609 exchanges: 264, 266
- FIPS code: 3400107810
- GNIS feature ID: 0885171
- Website: www.brigantinebeach.org

Brigantine (or simply The Island) is a city in Atlantic County in the U.S. state of New Jersey. As of the 2020 United States census, the city's population was 7,716, a decrease of 1,734 (−18.3%) from the 2010 census count of 9,450, which in turn reflected a decline of 3,144 (−25.0%) from the 12,594 counted in the 2000 census. The city, and all of Atlantic County, is part of the Atlantic City-Hammonton metropolitan statistical area, which in turn is included in the Philadelphia metropolitan area.

What is now the City of Brigantine has passed through a series of names and re-incorporations since it was first created. The area was originally incorporated as Brigantine Beach Borough by an act of the New Jersey Legislature on June 14, 1890, from portions of Galloway Township, based on the results of a referendum held on June 3, 1890. On April 23, 1897, the area was reincorporated as the City of Brigantine City. This name lasted until April 9, 1914, when it was renamed the City of East Atlantic City. On March 16, 1924, Brigantine was incorporated as a city, replacing East Atlantic City and incorporating further portions of Galloway Township. The borough was named for the many shipwrecks in the area, including those of brigantines.

New Jersey Monthly magazine ranked Brigantine as its 36th best place to live in its 2008 rankings of the "Best Places To Live" in New Jersey. NJ.com designated Brigantine fourth in its rankings of "The 25 best Jersey Shore towns, ranked" in 2021.

== Geography ==
According to the United States Census Bureau, the city had a total area of 10.86 square miles (28.14 km^{2}), including 6.52 square miles (16.89 km^{2}) of land and 4.34 square miles (11.25 km^{2}) of water (39.98%). Brigantine is located on Brigantine Island.

The only road to and from Brigantine is Route 87, locally known as Brigantine Boulevard. The Justice Vincent S. Haneman Memorial Bridge is the only way on and off the island. The original bridge to the island that was constructed in 1924 was destroyed in the Great Atlantic Hurricane of 1944. The current bridge was constructed in 1972.

The city borders the Atlantic County municipalities of Atlantic City and Galloway Township.

== Demographics ==
Historical population
| Census | Pop. | Note | %± |
|---|---|---|---|
| 1900 | 99 | | — |
| 1910 | 67 | | −32.3% |
| 1920 | 12 | | −82.1% |
| 1930 | 357 | | 2,875.0% |
| 1940 | 403 | | 12.9% |
| 1950 | 1,267 | | 214.4% |
| 1960 | 4,201 | | 231.6% |
| 1970 | 6,741 | | 60.5% |
| 1980 | 8,318 | | 23.4% |
| 1990 | 11,354 | | 36.5% |
| 2000 | 12,594 | | 10.9% |
| 2010 | 9,450 | | −25.0% |
| 2020 | 7,716 | | −18.3% |
| 2023 (est.) | 7,602 | | −1.5% |
Population sources: 1900–2000 1900–1920; 1900–1910 1910–1930; 1940–2000 2000; 2010 2020

=== 2020 census ===
As of the 2020 census, Brigantine had a population of 7,716. The median age was 56.8 years. 11.7% of residents were under the age of 18 and 31.2% of residents were 65 years of age or older. For every 100 females there were 92.7 males, and for every 100 females age 18 and over there were 91.8 males age 18 and over.

100.0% of residents lived in urban areas, while 0.0% lived in rural areas.

There were 3,798 households in Brigantine, of which 14.1% had children under the age of 18 living in them. Of all households, 42.5% were married-couple households, 20.5% were households with a male householder and no spouse or partner present, and 31.0% were households with a female householder and no spouse or partner present. About 36.6% of all households were made up of individuals and 17.4% had someone living alone who was 65 years of age or older.

There were 9,294 housing units, of which 59.1% were vacant. The homeowner vacancy rate was 3.4% and the rental vacancy rate was 14.2%.

Racial composition as of the 2020 census
| Race | Number | Percent |
|---|---|---|
| White | 6,537 | 84.7% |
| Black or African American | 181 | 2.3% |
| American Indian and Alaska Native | 20 | 0.3% |
| Asian | 386 | 5.0% |
| Native Hawaiian and Other Pacific Islander | 4 | 0.1% |
| Some other race | 191 | 2.5% |
| Two or more races | 397 | 5.1% |
| Hispanic or Latino (of any race) | 488 | 6.3% |

=== 2010 census ===
The 2010 United States census counted 9,450 people, 4,294 households, and 2,521 families in the city. The population density was 1,479.5/sq mi (571.2/km^{2}). There were 9,222 housing units at an average density of 1,443.8/sq mi (557.5/km^{2}). The racial makeup was 87.33% (8,253) White, 2.91% (275) Black or African American, 0.17% (16) Native American, 4.72% (446) Asian, 0.03% (3) Pacific Islander, 2.51% (237) from other races, and 2.33% (220) from two or more races. Hispanic or Latino of any race were 6.88% (650) of the population.

Of the 4,294 households, 18.5% had children under the age of 18; 43.3% were married couples living together; 11.1% had a female householder with no husband present and 41.3% were non-families. Of all households, 33.0% were made up of individuals and 12.5% had someone living alone who was 65 years of age or older. The average household size was 2.20 and the average family size was 2.79.

16.4% of the population were under the age of 18, 7.3% from 18 to 24, 21.0% from 25 to 44, 33.6% from 45 to 64, and 21.8% who were 65 years of age or older. The median age was 48.4 years. For every 100 females, the population had 95.4 males. For every 100 females ages 18 and older there were 92.1 males.

The Census Bureau's 2006–2010 American Community Survey showed that (in 2010 inflation-adjusted dollars) median household income was $62,212 (with a margin of error of +/− $7,472) and the median family income was $79,318 (+/− $7,962). Males had a median income of $55,595 (+/− $5,655) versus $42,622 (+/− $5,179) for females. The per capita income for the borough was $36,571 (+/− $3,305). About 5.9% of families and 7.6% of the population were below the poverty line, including 8.7% of those under age 18 and 3.9% of those age 65 or over.

=== 2000 census ===
As of the 2000 United States census there were 12,594 people, 5,473 households, and 3,338 families residing in the city. The population density was 1,959.0 inhabitants per square mile (756.4/km^{2}). There were 9,304 housing units at an average density of 1,447.2 per square mile (558.8/km^{2}). The racial makeup of the city was 83.15% White, 3.94% African American, 0.18% Native American, 5.72% Asian, 0.05% Pacific Islander, 4.67% from other races, and 2.29% from two or more races. Hispanic or Latino of any race were 9.41% of the population.

There were 5,473 households, out of which 24.0% had children under the age of 18 living with them, 44.9% were married couples living together, 11.7% had a female householder with no husband present, and 39.0% were non-families. 30.7% of all households were made up of individuals, and 9.9% had someone living alone who was 65 years of age or older. The average household size was 2.30 and the average family size was 2.89.

In the city the population was spread out, with 20.8% under the age of 18, 5.8% from 18 to 24, 30.9% from 25 to 44, 25.9% from 45 to 64, and 16.6% who were 65 years of age or older. The median age was 41 years. For every 100 females, there were 95.1 males. For every 100 females age 18 and over, there were 92.4 males.

The median income for a household in the city was $44,639, and the median income for a family was $51,679. Males had a median income of $40,523 versus $29,779 for females. The per capita income for the city was $23,950. About 7.6% of families and 9.4% of the population were below the poverty line, including 15.9% of those under age 18 and 7.2% of those age 65 or over.

== Points of interest ==
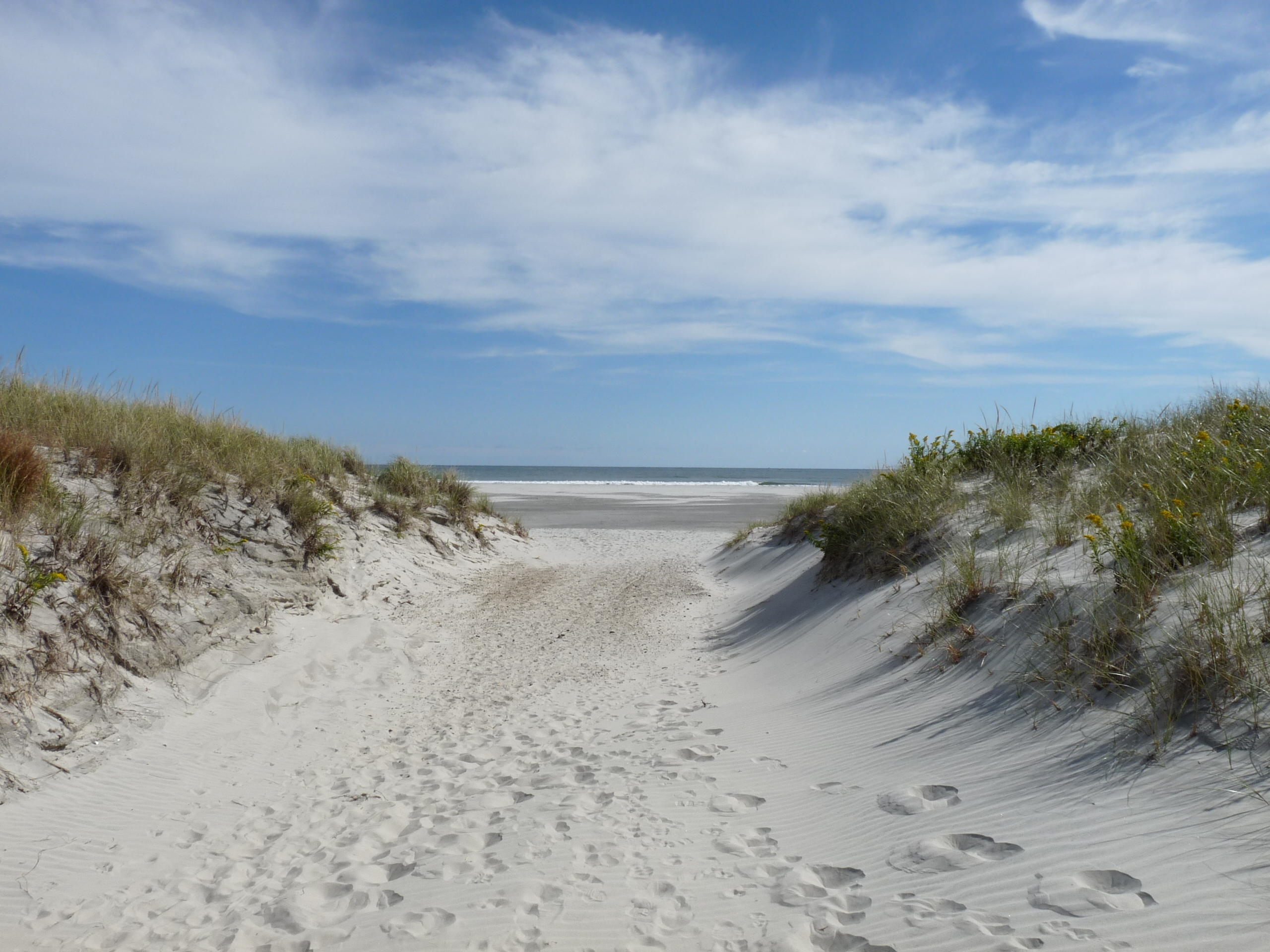
Beach at Brigantine, on the Atlantic Ocean side of the island

- Brigantine Lighthouse – Constructed by the Island Development Real Estate Company in 1926 as part of an effort to attract residents to the island, the structure was too far from shore and too low to be used as a functioning lighthouse and has been used over the years as headquarters for the Brigantine Police Department, as a museum and as a gift shop, in addition to being a central identifying symbol of the city.
- Marine Mammal Stranding Center – Established in 1978 as the state's only marine stranding center, the center rehabilitates and releases stranded marine mammals and sea turtles, rescuing more than 3,900 whales, dolphins, seals and sea turtles since it was formed.
- Part of the Edwin B. Forsythe National Wildlife Refuge is located on the northern end of Brigantine Island. The Refuge provides crucial habitat for many different types of endangered or threatened birds, including the American bald eagle, peregrine falcon, American black duck, and the piping plover.
- The Brigantine Hotel, still standing on the Atlantic coast side of the island, was an early integrated hotel starting in the 1940s, and was owned for a period by Father Divine's International Peace Mission movement. African American entrepreneur Sarah Spencer Washington acquired the hotel in the 1940s from Father Divine and created the area's first integrated beach area. The facility is now known as Legacy Vacation Resorts Brigantine Beach.

== Government ==
=== Local government ===
Since 1989, the City of Brigantine has been governed within the Faulkner Act (formally known as the Optional Municipal Charter Law) under the Council-Manager form (Plan 5), implemented by direct petition effective as of January 1, 1991. The city is one of 42 municipalities (of the 564) statewide that use this form of government. The governing body is composed of the Mayor (elected at large), two at-large council members and four ward council members, all of whom serve terms of office of four years. The mayor and the two at-large council seats come up for vote as part of the November general election in leap years, with the four ward seats up for vote simultaneously two years later. The Mayor presides over the meetings of the City Council. The Council adopts the municipal budget and enacts ordinances to promote and ensure the security, health, government and protection of the City and its residents.

As of 2026, the Mayor of Brigantine is Republican Vince Sera, who is serving a term of office ending December 31, 2026; he had been first elected to serve the balance of the term that became vacant following the death of Andy Simpson. Members of the City Council are Deputy Mayor Karen Bew (R, 2028; Ward 1), Dennis Haney (R, 2028; Ward 3), Neal Kane (R, 2026; At-Large), Paul Lettieri (R, 2028; Ward 2), Michael Riordan (R, 2026; At-Large), and Mark Virgilio (R, 2028; Ward 4).

In September 2020, the city council appointed Vince Sera as mayor to fill the seat expiring in December 2022 that became vacant following the death of Andy Simpson the previous month. Later that month, Tom Kane was selected from a list of three candidates nominated by the Republican municipal committee to fill the at-large seat expiring in December 2022 that had been held by Sera until he took office as mayor.

In January 2019, the city council selected Paul Lettieri to fill the Ward 2 seat that had been held by Michael Riordan unil he vacated it to take the at-large seat he won in the November 2018 general election; Lettieri served on an interim basis until the November 2019 general election, when he was elected to serve the balance of the term of office.

In December 2015, John Withers IV was selected from three candidates nominated by the Democratic municipal committee to fill the Ward 3 seat expiring in December 2016 that had been vacated following the resignation of Joseph M. Picardi earlier that month.

Karen Bew was selected in January 2015 from among three candidates nominated by the Republican municipal committee to fill the Ward 1 seat that was vacated by Andrew Simpson when he took office in an at-large seat. In November 2015, she was elected to serve the balance of the term.

=== Federal, state and county representation ===
Brigantine is located in the 2nd Congressional District and is part of New Jersey's 2nd state legislative district.

For the 119th United States Congress, New Jersey's 2nd congressional district is represented by Jeff Van Drew (R, Dennis Township). New Jersey is represented in the United States Senate by Democrats Cory Booker (Newark, term ends 2027) and Andy Kim (Moorestown, term ends 2031).

For the 2026–2027 session, the 2nd legislative district of the New Jersey Legislature is represented in the New Jersey Senate by Vincent J. Polistina (R, Egg Harbor Township) and in the General Assembly by Don Guardian (R, Atlantic City) and Maureen Rowan (D, Atlantic City).

Atlantic County is governed by a directly elected county executive and a nine-member Board of County Commissioners, responsible for legislation. The executive serves a four-year term and the commissioners are elected to staggered three-year terms, of which four are elected from the county on an at-large basis and five of the commissioners represent equally populated districts. As of 2025, Atlantic County's Executive is Dennis Levinson (R, Northfield), whose term of office ends December 31, 2027. Members of the Board of County Commissioners are:

Ernest D. Coursey (D, District 1-- Atlantic City, Egg Harbor Township (part), Longport, Margate City, and Ventnor City; 2025, Atlantic City), Chair Maureen Kern (R, District 2-- Egg Harbor Township (part), Linwood, Northfield, Somers Point and Pleasantville; 2027, Somers Point), Andrew Parker III (R, District 3-- Egg Harbor Township (part) and Hamilton Township (part); 2026, Egg Harbor Township), Richard R. Dase (R, District 4, including Brigantine, Galloway Township, Egg Harbor Township (part), and Port Republic; 2025, Galloway Township), Vice Chair James A. Bertino (R, District 5-- Buena, Buena Vista Township, Corbin City, Egg Harbor City, Estell Manor, Folsom, Hamilton Township (part), Hammonton, Mullica Township and Weymouth Township; 2027, Hammonton), June Byrnes (R, At-Large; 2026, Linwood), Michael Ruffu (R, At-Large; Margate, 2027) Amy L. Gatto (R, At-large; 2025, Hamilton Township) and John W. Risley (R, At-Large; 2026, Egg Harbor Township)

Atlantic County's constitutional officers are: Clerk Joesph J. Giralo (R, 2026, Hammonton), Sheriff Joe O'Donoghue (R, 2026, Egg Harbor Township) and Surrogate James Curcio (R, 2025, Hammonton).

=== Politics ===
As of March 23, 2011, there was a total of 6,430 registered voters in Brigantine City, of whom 1,219 (19.0% vs. 30.5% countywide) were registered as Democrats, 2,679 (41.7% vs. 25.2%) were registered as Republicans, and 2,524 (39.3% vs. 44.3%) were registered as Unaffiliated. There were 8 voters registered as Libertarians or Greens. Among the city's 2010 Census population, 68.0% (vs. 58.8% in Atlantic County) were registered to vote, including 81.4% of those ages 18 and over (vs. 76.6% countywide).

Gubernatorial election results for Brigantine
| Year | Republican | | Democratic | | Third party(ies) | |
| Year | No. | % | No. | % | No. | % |
|---|---|---|---|---|---|---|
| 2025 | 2,211 | 60.59% | 1,429 | 39.16% | 9 | 0.25% |
| 2021 | 2,165 | 62.57% | 1,276 | 36.88% | 19 | 0.55% |
| 2017 | 1,495 | 56.59% | 1,097 | 41.52% | 50 | 1.89% |
| 2013 | 2,270 | 75.17% | 715 | 23.68% | 35 | 1.16% |
| 2009 | 1,877 | 58.24% | 1,147 | 35.59% | 199 | 6.17% |
| 2005 | 1,617 | 55.04% | 1,242 | 42.27% | 79 | 2.69% |

In the 2012 presidential election, Republican Mitt Romney received 2,462 votes (53.5% vs. 41.1% countywide), ahead of Democrat Barack Obama with 2,068 votes (44.9% vs. 57.9%) and other candidates with 49 votes (1.1% vs. 0.9%), among the 4,605 ballots cast by the city's 6,944 registered voters, for a turnout of 66.3% (vs. 65.8% in Atlantic County). In the 2008 presidential election, Republican John McCain received 2,652 votes (53.2% vs. 41.6% countywide), ahead of Democrat Barack Obama with 2,218 votes (44.5% vs. 56.5%) and other candidates with 67 votes (1.3% vs. 1.1%), among the 4,984 ballots cast by the city's 7,214 registered voters, for a turnout of 69.1% (vs. 68.1% in Atlantic County). In the 2004 presidential election, Republican George W. Bush received 2,627 votes (53.7% vs. 46.2% countywide), ahead of Democrat John Kerry with 2,181 votes (44.6% vs. 52.0%) and other candidates with 36 votes (0.7% vs. 0.8%), among the 4,888 ballots cast by the city's 6,847 registered voters, for a turnout of 71.4% (vs. 69.8% in the whole county).

Presidential elections results
| Year | Republican | Democratic | Third Parties |
|---|---|---|---|
| 2024 | 59.2% 2,785 | 39.0% 1,833 | 1.8% 63 |
| 2020 | 57.4% 3,020 | 41.6% 2,185 | 1.0% 54 |
| 2016 | 56.6% 2,335 | 39.3% 1,620 | 4.1% 167 |
| 2012 | 53.5% 2,462 | 44.9% 2,068 | 1.1% 49 |
| 2008 | 53.2% 2,652 | 44.5% 2,218 | 1.3% 67 |
| 2004 | 53.7% 2,627 | 44.6% 2,181 | 0.7% 36 |

In the 2013 gubernatorial election, Republican Chris Christie received 2,270 votes (73.2% vs. 60.0% countywide), ahead of Democrat Barbara Buono with 715 votes (23.1% vs. 34.9%) and other candidates with 35 votes (1.1% vs. 1.3%), among the 3,099 ballots cast by the city's 6,977 registered voters, yielding a 44.4% turnout (vs. 41.5% in the county). In the 2009 gubernatorial election, Republican Chris Christie received 1,877 votes (57.7% vs. 47.7% countywide), ahead of Democrat Jon Corzine with 1,147 votes (35.2% vs. 44.5%), Independent Chris Daggett with 173 votes (5.3% vs. 4.8%) and other candidates with 26 votes (0.8% vs. 1.2%), among the 3,255 ballots cast by the city's 6,632 registered voters, yielding a 49.1% turnout (vs. 44.9% in the county).

United States Senate election results for Brigantine1
| Year | Republican | | Democratic | | Third party(ies) | |
| Year | No. | % | No. | % | No. | % |
|---|---|---|---|---|---|---|
| 2024 | 2,731 | 60.09% | 1,761 | 38.75% | 53 | 1.17% |
| 2018 | 2,125 | 62.48% | 1,173 | 34.49% | 103 | 3.03% |
| 2012 | 2,294 | 52.36% | 2,007 | 45.81% | 80 | 1.83% |
| 2006 | 1,940 | 58.17% | 1,322 | 39.64% | 73 | 2.19% |

United States Senate election results for Brigantine2
| Year | Republican | | Democratic | | Third party(ies) | |
| Year | No. | % | No. | % | No. | % |
|---|---|---|---|---|---|---|
| 2020 | 2,972 | 57.89% | 2,098 | 40.86% | 64 | 1.25% |
| 2014 | 2,145 | 58.65% | 1,502 | 41.07% | 10 | 0.27% |
| 2013 | 1,094 | 61.81% | 655 | 37.01% | 21 | 1.19% |
| 2008 | 2,522 | 54.54% | 2,048 | 44.29% | 54 | 1.17% |

== Education ==
The Brigantine Public Schools serves students in pre-kindergarten through eighth grade. As of the 2022–23 school year, the district, comprised of one school, had an enrollment of 392 students and 59.2 classroom teachers (on an FTE basis), for a student–teacher ratio of 6.6:1. The district's board of education is comprised of seven members who set policy and oversee the fiscal and educational operation of the district through its administration. As a Type I school district, the board's trustees are appointed by the Mayor to serve three-year terms of office on a staggered basis, with either two or three members up for reappointment each year. Of the more than 600 school districts statewide, Brigantine is one of about a dozen districts with appointed school districts.

Students in public school for ninth through twelfth grades, along with those from Longport, Margate City and Ventnor City, attend Atlantic City High School in neighboring Atlantic City, as part of sending/receiving relationships with the Atlantic City School District. As of the 2022–23 school year, the high school had an enrollment of 1,764 students and 146.8 classroom teachers (on an FTE basis), for a student–teacher ratio of 12.0:1.

City public school students are also eligible to attend the Atlantic County Institute of Technology in the Mays Landing section of Hamilton Township or the Charter-Tech High School for the Performing Arts, located in Somers Point.

== Transportation ==
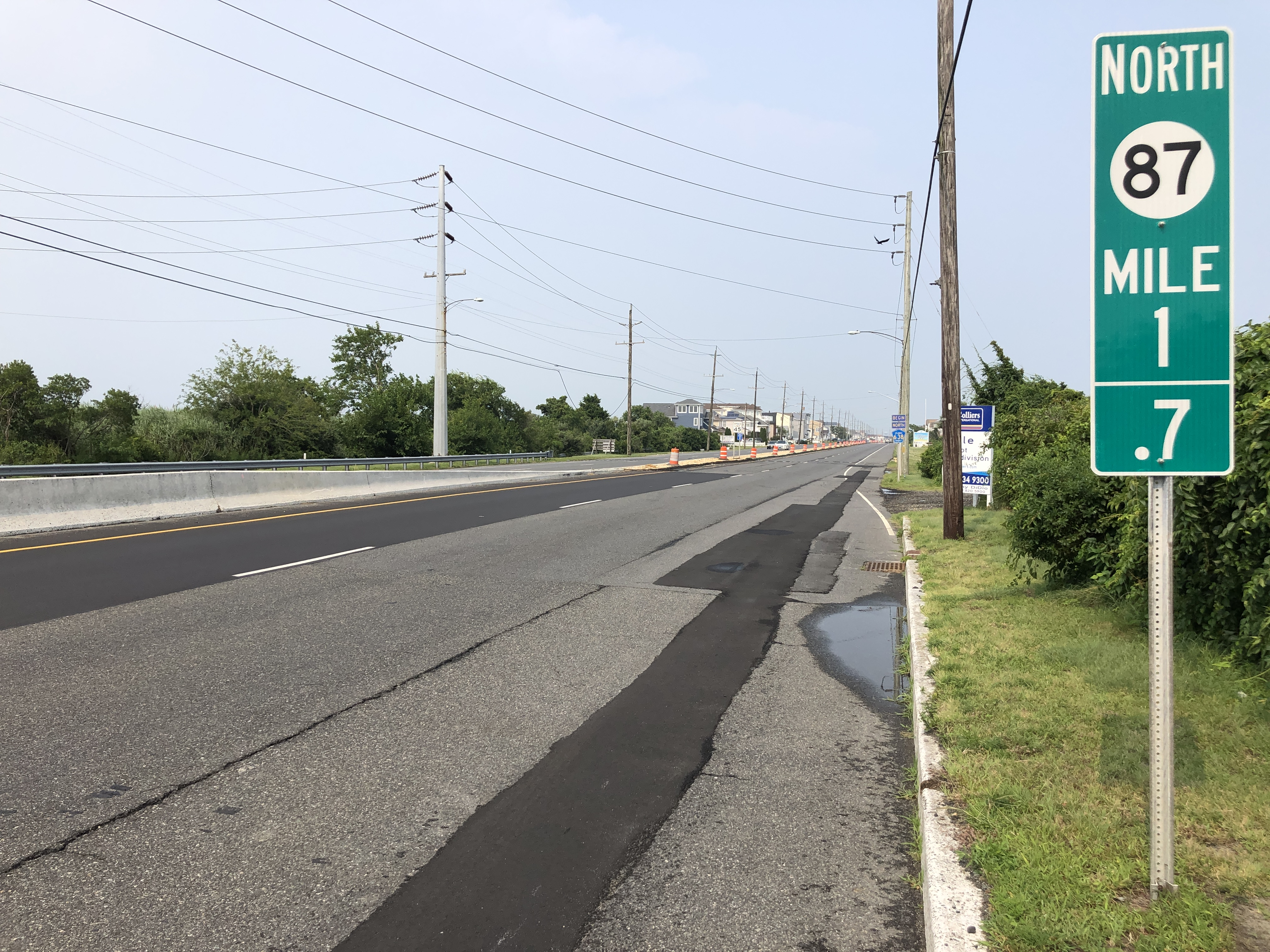
Route 87 northbound entering Brigantine

=== Roads and highways ===
As of May 2010, the city had a total of 64.45 mi (103.72 km) of roadways, of which 60.54 mi (97.43 km) were maintained by the municipality, 3.74 mi (6.02 km) by Atlantic County, 0.06 mi (0.097 km) by the New Jersey Department of Transportation and 0.11 mi (0.18 km) by the South Jersey Transportation Authority.

Constructed in 1972, the Brigantine Bridge is a vehicular bridge over Absecon Inlet, providing the only road access to Brigantine Island; formally known as the Justice Vincent S. Haneman Memorial Bridge, it carries Route 87.

=== Public transportation ===
NJ Transit provides bus service to and from Atlantic City on the 501 route.

== Climate ==
According to the Köppen climate classification system, Brigantine has a humid subtropical climate (Cfa) with hot, moderately humid summers, cool winters and year-around precipitation. Cfa climates are characterized by all months having an average mean temperature above 32.0 °F (0.0 °C), at least four months with an average mean temperature at or above 50.0 °F (10.0 °C), at least one month with an average mean temperature at or above 71.6 °F (22.0 °C) and no significant precipitation difference between seasons. During the summer months in Brigantine, a cooling afternoon sea breeze is present on most days, but episodes of extreme heat and humidity can occur with heat index values at or above 95.0 °F (35.0 °C). During the winter months, episodes of extreme cold and wind can occur with wind chill values below 0.0 °F (−17.8 °C). The plant hardiness zone at Brigantine Beach is 7b with an average annual extreme minimum air temperature of 7.3 °F (−13.7 °C). The average seasonal (November–April) snowfall total is 12 to 18 in (30 to 46 cm), and the average snowiest month is February which corresponds with the annual peak in nor'easter activity.

Climate data for Brigantine Beach, NJ (1981–2010 Averages)
| Month | Jan | Feb | Mar | Apr | May | Jun | Jul | Aug | Sep | Oct | Nov | Dec | Year |
|---|---|---|---|---|---|---|---|---|---|---|---|---|---|
| Mean daily maximum °F (°C) | 41.2 (5.1) | 43.1 (6.2) | 49.7 (9.8) | 58.1 (14.5) | 67.7 (19.8) | 76.8 (24.9) | 81.9 (27.7) | 80.9 (27.2) | 75.4 (24.1) | 65.2 (18.4) | 55.8 (13.2) | 46.1 (7.8) | 61.9 (16.6) |
| Daily mean °F (°C) | 34.0 (1.1) | 35.9 (2.2) | 42.3 (5.7) | 51.0 (10.6) | 60.4 (15.8) | 69.8 (21.0) | 75.2 (24.0) | 74.2 (23.4) | 68.2 (20.1) | 57.5 (14.2) | 48.3 (9.1) | 38.8 (3.8) | 54.7 (12.6) |
| Mean daily minimum °F (°C) | 26.8 (−2.9) | 28.7 (−1.8) | 34.8 (1.6) | 43.9 (6.6) | 53.1 (11.7) | 62.8 (17.1) | 68.5 (20.3) | 67.6 (19.8) | 61.0 (16.1) | 49.8 (9.9) | 40.7 (4.8) | 31.5 (−0.3) | 47.5 (8.6) |
| Average precipitation inches (mm) | 3.19 (81) | 2.88 (73) | 4.10 (104) | 3.54 (90) | 3.08 (78) | 2.85 (72) | 3.32 (84) | 4.01 (102) | 3.03 (77) | 3.54 (90) | 3.33 (85) | 3.84 (98) | 40.71 (1,034) |
| Average relative humidity (%) | 68.1 | 67.3 | 64.6 | 66.2 | 70.6 | 74.2 | 73.9 | 75.6 | 74.0 | 71.6 | 69.5 | 68.7 | 70.4 |
| Average dew point °F (°C) | 24.6 (−4.1) | 26.1 (−3.3) | 31.2 (−0.4) | 40.1 (4.5) | 50.8 (10.4) | 61.2 (16.2) | 66.3 (19.1) | 66.0 (18.9) | 59.6 (15.3) | 48.4 (9.1) | 38.8 (3.8) | 29.4 (−1.4) | 45.3 (7.4) |
Source: PRISM

Climate data for Atlantic City, NJ Ocean Water Temperature (4 SW Brigantine)
| Month | Jan | Feb | Mar | Apr | May | Jun | Jul | Aug | Sep | Oct | Nov | Dec | Year |
|---|---|---|---|---|---|---|---|---|---|---|---|---|---|
| Daily mean °F (°C) | 37 (3) | 35 (2) | 42 (6) | 48 (9) | 56 (13) | 63 (17) | 70 (21) | 73 (23) | 70 (21) | 61 (16) | 53 (12) | 44 (7) | 54 (12) |
Source: NOAA

== Ecology ==
According to the A. W. Kuchler U.S. potential natural vegetation types, Brigantine would have a dominant vegetation type of Northern Cordgrass (73) with a dominant vegetation form of Coastal Prairie (20).

== Notable people ==
People who were born in, residents of, or otherwise closely associated with Brigantine include:

- Valerie H. Armstrong, retired judge of the New Jersey Superior Court
- Ray Birdwhistell (1918–1994), anthropologist who founded kinesics as a field of inquiry and research
- Dan Borislow (1961–2014), entrepreneur, sports team owner, inventor and thoroughbred horse breeder
- Mark A. Brown (born 1961), gaming industry executive who has been CEO of Trump Hotels and Casinos Inc. and President of The Venetian Macao, Sands Macao and The Four Seasons Macau
- Angelo Coia (1938–2013), football end who played in the NFL for the Chicago Bears, the Washington Redskins and the Atlanta Falcons
- Vincent S. Haneman (1902–1978), Associate Justice of New Jersey Supreme Court from 1960 to 1971, who served eight years as Brigantine's mayor
- Amy Kennedy (born 1978), educator, mental health advocate and politician who was the Democratic Party nominee in the 2020 elections seeking to represent New Jersey's 2nd congressional district
- Brett Kennedy (born 1994), pitcher for the San Diego Padres of Major League Baseball
- Patrick J. Kennedy (born 1967), former member of United States House of Representatives
- Brittany Lee Lewis (born 1990), professor, television personality, domestic violence awareness advocate, Miss Delaware 2014 and Miss Black America 2017
- Guy Marks (1923–1987), actor, comedian, singer and impressionist, who appeared on TV sitcoms and variety shows of 1960s and 1970s
- Harry Olivieri (1916–2006), co-creator of the Philly cheesesteak and owner of Pat's King of Steaks
- Carol Plum-Ucci (born 1957), young adult novelist and essayist
- John Rosenbaum (1934–2003), California artist and educator
- Katherine Shindle (born 1977), actress, singer, dancer and AIDS activist who was Miss America 1998 and Miss Illinois 1997
- Slappy White (1921–1995), comedian and actor

| Preceded by Beach Haven | Beaches of New Jersey | Succeeded by Atlantic City |
