= Somers Point, New Jersey =

City in Atlantic County, New Jersey, US

- City
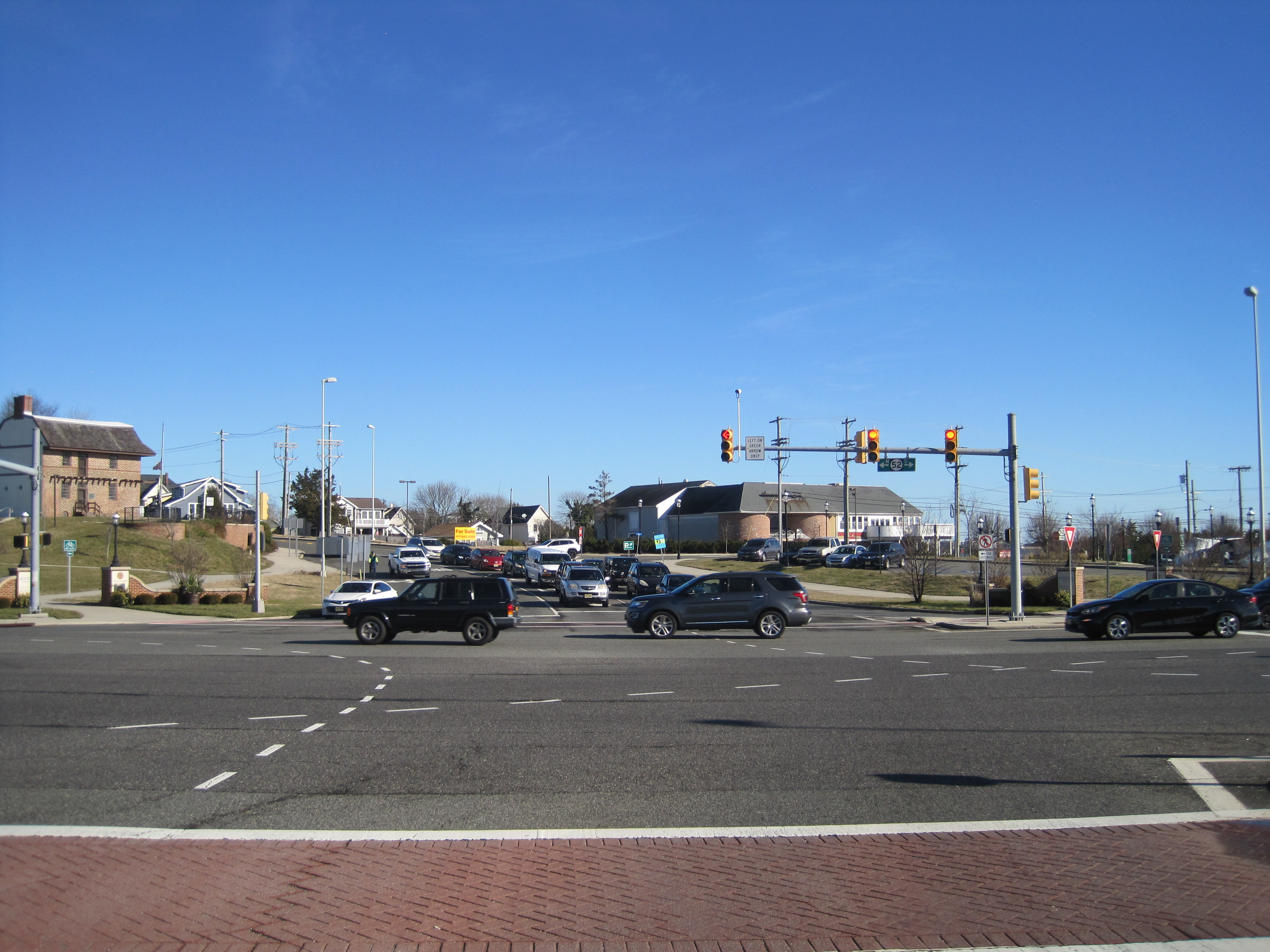
- The site of the former Somers Point Circle at Route 52, CR 559, and CR 585

- Seal
- Motto: "The Shore Starts Here"
- Map of Somers Point in Atlantic County. Inset: Location of Atlantic County highlighted in the State of New Jersey.

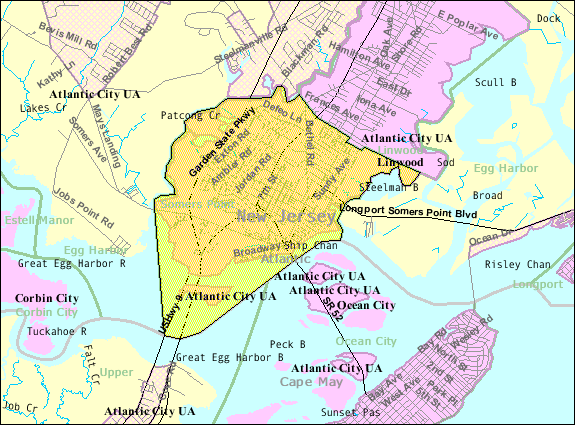
- Census Bureau map of Somers Point, New Jersey

- Location in Atlantic County Location in New Jersey Location in the United States
- Coordinates: 39.317225°N 74.60637°W
- Country: United States
- State: New Jersey
- County: Atlantic
- European settlement: 1693
- Incorporated: April 24, 1886 (as Borough)
- Reincorporated: April 2, 1890
- Reincorporated: April 9, 1902 (as city)
- Named for: Richard Somers

Government
  - Type: City
  - Body: City Council
  - Mayor: Dennis Tapp (R, term ends December 31, 2027)
  - Administrator: Jason Frost
  - Municipal clerk: Shelby R. Heath

Area
  - Total: 5.23 sq mi (13.55 km^{2})
  - Land: 4.01 sq mi (10.39 km^{2})
  - Water: 1.22 sq mi (3.17 km^{2}) 23.37%
  - Rank: 270th of 565 in state 18th of 23 in county
- Elevation: 16 ft (4.9 m)

Population (2020)
  - Total: 10,469
  - Estimate (2023): 10,465
  - Rank: 235th of 565 in state 7th of 23 in county
  - Density: 2,610.7/sq mi (1,008.0/km^{2})
  - Rank: 243rd of 565 in state 5th of 23 in county
- Time zone: UTC−05:00 (Eastern (EST))
  - Summer (DST): UTC−04:00 (Eastern (EDT))
- ZIP Code: 08244
- Area code: 609 exchanges: 601, 653, 926, 927
- FIPS code: 34001684307
- GNIS feature ID: 0885397
- Website: www.somerspointgov.org

Somers Point is a city situated on the Jersey Shore that is the oldest settlement in Atlantic County, in the U.S. state of New Jersey. It was settled by Europeans in 1693 and was incorporated as a borough in 1886. Somers Point was incorporated as a city in 1902. The city is located in eastern Atlantic County, southwest of Atlantic City, in the South Jersey region of the state.

As of the 2020 United States census, the city's population was 10,469, a decrease of 326 (−3.0%) from the 2010 census count of 10,795, which in turn reflected a decline of 819 (−7.1%) from the 11,614 counted in the 2000 census. Somers Point and all of Atlantic County lie within the Atlantic City-Hammonton metropolitan statistical area, which in turn constitutes part of the Philadelphia-Reading-Camden combined statistical area.

== History ==
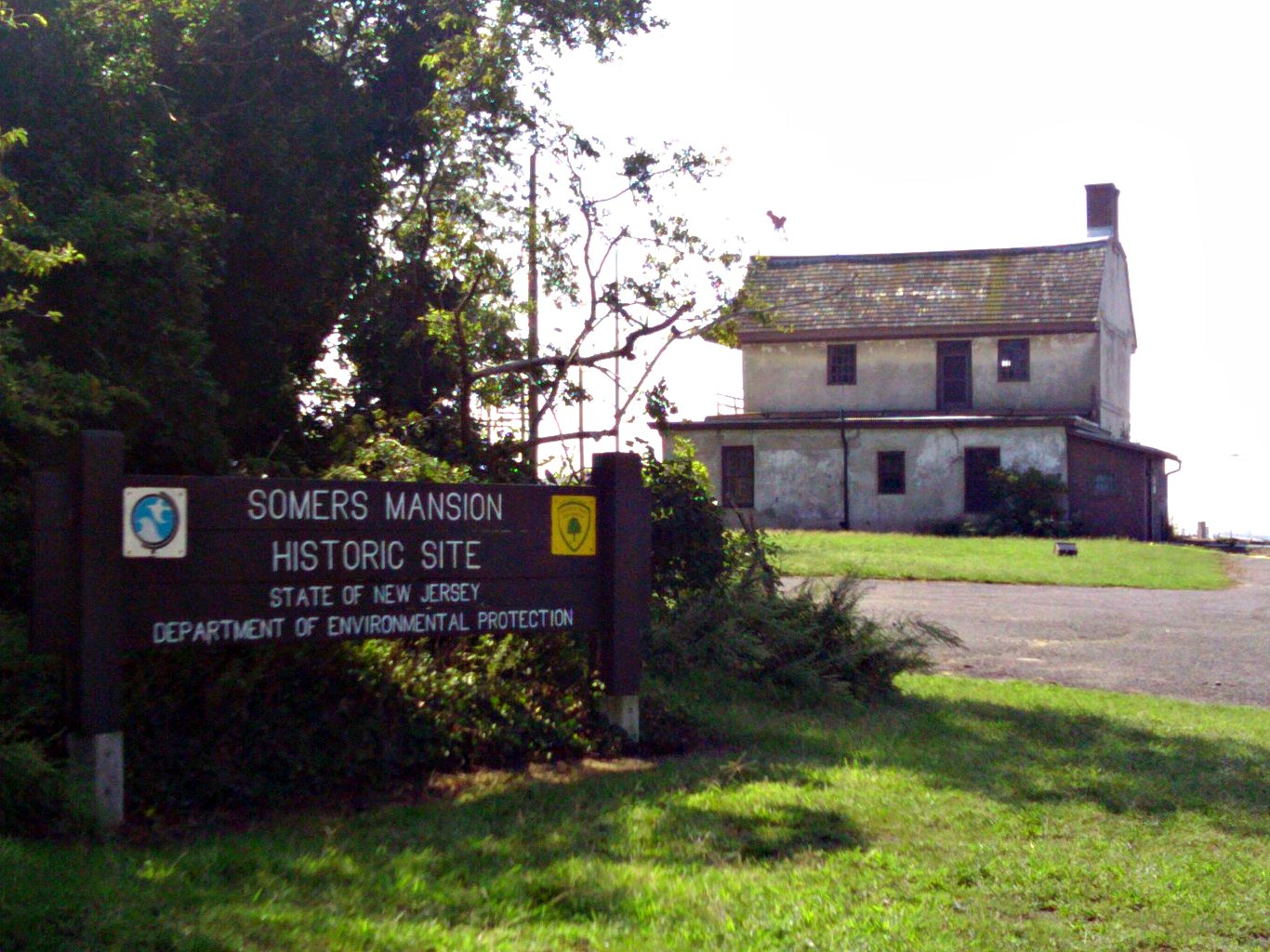
Historical Somers Mansion

The earliest residents of the area were the Lenape Native Americans. John Somers was the first European settler in what is now Somers Point. Somers purchased the land along the northern periphery of the Great Egg Harbor Bay from Thomas Budd in 1693, making it the oldest European settlement in what is now Atlantic County. Great Egg Harbour Township was designated in 1693 from the eastern portions of Gloucester County, which included Somers Point. Somers named the area Somerset Plantation. In 1695, John Somers operated the first ferry service across the Great Egg Harbor Bay to Cape May County. His son Richard built Somers Mansion overlooking the harbor sometime between 1720 and 1726, which remains the county's oldest existing home. Early names for the area were Somerset Plantation, Somers Ferry, and Somers Plantation, until the name Somers Point was established in 1750. Somers Point was designated as a port of entry in 1791 and remained one until it was abolished in 1915. By the 1830s, when Somers Point became part of Atlantic County, it was a popular summer resort with several boarding houses.

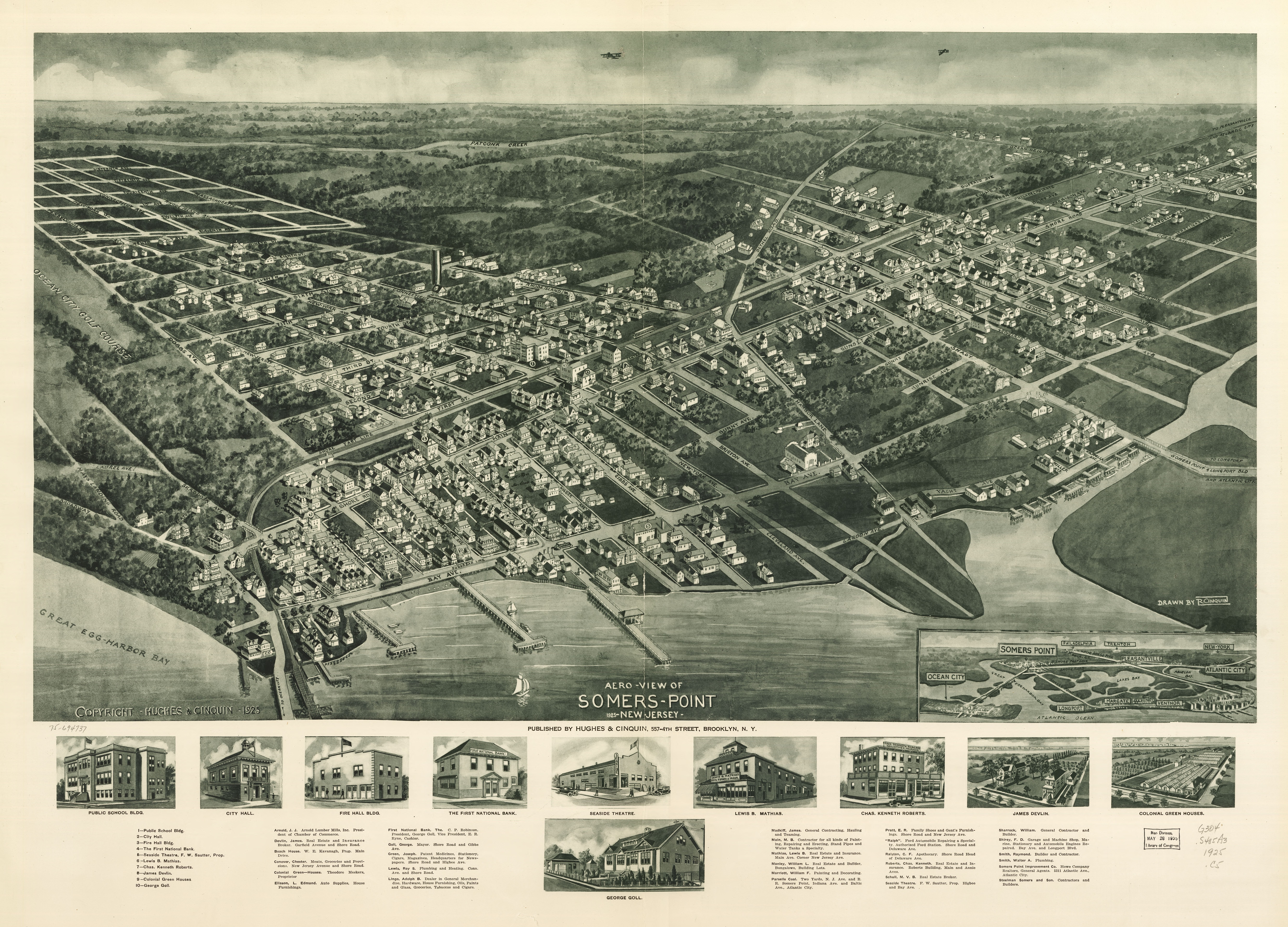
Panoramic map of "Somers-Point" with list of landmarks and images of several inset (1925)

Somers Point was originally incorporated as a borough by an act of the New Jersey Legislature on April 24, 1886, from portions of Egg Harbor Township, based on the results of a referendum held five days earlier. At that time, there were 48 people registered to vote in the borough. Somers Point was subsequently reincorporated as a borough on April 2, 1890, based on the previous day's referendum, and was finally incorporated as a city on April 9, 1902, from all of Somers Point borough and additional portions of Egg Harbor Township. All were named for John Somers.

== Geography ==
According to the United States Census Bureau, the city had a total area of 5.23 square miles (13.55 km^{2}), including 4.01 square miles (10.39 km^{2}) of land and 1.22 square miles (3.17 km^{2}) of water (23.37%).

Unincorporated communities, localities and place names located partially or completely within the township include Ocean Heights.

The city borders Egg Harbor Township, Longport and Linwood in Atlantic County; and both Ocean City and Upper Township in Cape May County.

== Demographics ==
Historical population
Census	Pop.	Note	%±
1890	191		—
1900	308		61.3%
1910	604		96.1%
1920	843		39.6%
1930	2,073		145.9%
1940	1,992		−3.9%
1950	2,480		24.5%
1960	4,504		81.6%
1970	7,919		75.8%
1980	10,330		30.4%
1990	11,216		8.6%
2000	11,614		3.5%
2010	10,795		−7.1%
2020	10,469		−3.0%
2023 (est.)	10,465		0.0%
Population sources: 1890–2000; 1890–1920 1890–1920; 1890–1910 1910–1930; 1940–2000 2000; 2010 2020

=== 2020 census ===
As of the 2020 census, Somers Point had a population of 10,469. The median age was 47.2 years. 16.5% of residents were under the age of 18 and 21.2% of residents were 65 years of age or older. For every 100 females there were 89.9 males, and for every 100 females age 18 and over there were 87.9 males age 18 and over.

100.0% of residents lived in urban areas, while 0.0% lived in rural areas.

There were 4,844 households in Somers Point, of which 19.8% had children under the age of 18 living in them. Of all households, 34.7% were married-couple households, 22.0% were households with a male householder and no spouse or partner present, and 35.1% were households with a female householder and no spouse or partner present. About 35.9% of all households were made up of individuals and 14.9% had someone living alone who was 65 years of age or older.

There were 5,589 housing units, of which 13.3% were vacant. The homeowner vacancy rate was 1.5% and the rental vacancy rate was 4.4%.

Racial composition as of the 2020 census
Race	Number	Percent
White	7,817	74.7%
Black or African American	846	8.1%
American Indian and Alaska Native	29	0.3%
Asian	296	2.8%
Native Hawaiian and Other Pacific Islander	3	0.0%
Some other race	653	6.2%
Two or more races	825	7.9%
Hispanic or Latino (of any race)	1,374	13.1%

=== 2010 census ===
The 2010 United States census counted 10,795 people, 4,655 households, and 2,826 families in the city. The population density was 2,678.8 per square mile (1,034.3/km^{2}). There were 5,556 housing units at an average density of 1,378.7 per square mile (532.3/km^{2}). The racial makeup was 78.75% (8,501) White, 10.68% (1,153) Black or African American, 0.25% (27) Native American, 3.08% (332) Asian, 0.06% (6) Pacific Islander, 4.17% (450) from other races, and 3.02% (326) from two or more races. Hispanic or Latino of any race were 9.49% (1,024) of the population.

Of the 4,655 households, 26.2% had children under the age of 18; 36.8% were married couples living together; 18.2% had a female householder with no husband present and 39.3% were non-families. Of all households, 31.9% were made up of individuals and 11.1% had someone living alone who was 65 years of age or older. The average household size was 2.32 and the average family size was 2.90.

21.3% of the population were under the age of 18, 9.0% from 18 to 24, 24.0% from 25 to 44, 31.1% from 45 to 64, and 14.6% who were 65 years of age or older. The median age was 41.4 years. For every 100 females, the population had 88.5 males. For every 100 females ages 18 and older there were 84.5 males.

The Census Bureau's 2006–2010 American Community Survey showed that (in 2010 inflation-adjusted dollars) median household income was $47,312 (with a margin of error of +/− $4,646) and the median family income was $51,489 (+/− $7,704). Males had a median income of $45,385 (+/− $6,862) versus $37,536 (+/− $3,731) for females. The per capita income for the city was $29,626 (+/− $1,822). About 11.9% of families and 12.7% of the population were below the poverty line, including 25.6% of those under age 18 and 6.6% of those age 65 or over.

=== 2000 census ===
At the 2000 United States census, there were 11,614 people, 4,920 households and 2,952 families residing in the city. The population density was 2,883.1 inhabitants per square mile (1,113.2/km^{2}). There were 5,402 housing units at an average density of 1,341.0 per square mile (517.8/km^{2}). The racial makeup of the city was 85.66% White, 7.01% African American, 0.25% Native American, 3.17% Asian, 0.03% Pacific Islander, 2.25% from other races, and 1.64% from two or more races. Hispanic or Latino of any race were 5.99% of the population.

There were 4,920 households, of which 29.4% had children under the age of 18 living with them, 41.2% were married couples living together, 14.5% had a female householder with no husband present, and 40.0% were non-families. 32.9% of all households were made up of individuals, and 11.7% had someone living alone who was 65 years of age or older. The average household size was 2.32 and the average family size was 2.97.

Age distribution was 23.4% under the age of 18, 7.1% from 18 to 24, 31.6% from 25 to 44, 22.9% from 45 to 64, and 15.1% who were 65 years of age or older. The median age was 38 years. For every 100 females, there were 88.7 males. For every 100 females age 18 and over, there were 84.2 males.

The median household income was $42,222, and the median family income was $51,868. Males had a median income of $39,650 versus $28,691 for females. The per capita income for the city was $22,229. About 5.0% of families and 7.0% of the population were below the poverty line, including 8.3% of those under age 18 and 2.3% of those age 65 or over.

== Economy ==
The largest employer in Somers Point is Shore Medical Center, with 1,500 employees, 370 physicians, and 296 beds.

Somers Point is the home to the largest crabbing tournament in the United States, the Assault on Patcong Creek. Founded in 2010, the tournament takes place annually in June and attracts participants from over a dozen states.

== Parks and recreation ==
Portions of the Right-of-way of the Atlantic City and Shore Railroad, running for 6 miles (9.7 km) between Pleasantville and Somers Point have been repurposed as the Somers Point Bike Path.

John F. Kennedy Park, located at 50 Broadway, is a 6.18 acre public use park overlooking the Great Egg Harbor bay. Formerly High Bank Park, it was renamed in 1963 in honor of the 35th President of the United States.

William Fehrle Athletic Field located at 3rd Street and Rhode Island Ave is named in honor of Sgt. William Fehrle. A member of the ill-fated 106th Infantry Division, he was taken prisoner during the Battle of the Bulge and would die while imprisoned in a German POW camp.

== Government ==
=== Local government ===
Somers Point is governed under the City form of government, as one of 15 municipalities (of the 564) statewide that use this traditional form of government. The governing body is comprised of the Mayor and the seven-member City Council, all elected on a partisan basis as part of the November general election. The mayor serves a four-year term, with a single council at-large seat and one council member from each of the two wards up for election each year in a three-year cycle. The Mayor is responsible for the health, safety and welfare of the municipality. As the city's Chief Executive Officer, the Mayor puts into effect the municipal laws, known as ordinances. The Mayor can veto ordinances and may vote in the event of a tie. The Mayor makes appointments to certain boards, including the Planning Board, Recreation Commission, and Environmental Commission. The Council elects one of its members as president to chair the Council meetings and perform the other duties of a presiding officer. The City Council enacts ordinances, adopts an annual budget and sets policy for the city.

As of 2024, the Mayor of Somers Point is Republican Dennis Tapp, whose term of office ends on December 31, 2027. Members of the City Council are Council President Janice Johnston (R, 2024; 1st Ward), Richard L. DePamphilis III (R, 2026; 1st Ward), Charles J. Haberkorn (R, 2026; 2nd Ward), Howard W. Dill (R, 2024; 2nd Ward), Joseph T. McCarrie Jr. (R, 2024; At Large), Sean T. McGuigan (R, 2025; 1st Ward) and Michael Owen (R, 2025; 2nd Ward).

After Stacy Ferreri resigned in January 2022 from her seat expiring in December 2023, the City Council appointed Ken Adams, though Adams was forced to step down in February after it was discovered that he had a felony conviction that disqualified him from serving. In March 2022, Richard DePamphilis was appointed to fill the vacant seat. In the November 2022 general election, DePamphilis won the balance of the term of office.

In August 2019, the City Council selected Janice Johnston from a list of three candidates nominated by the Republican municipal committee to fill the First Ward seat expiring in December 2021 that had been held by Ron Meischker until he resigned the previous month after announcing that he was moving out of the city.

In September 2017, the City Council selected Ron Meischker from a list of three candidates nominated by the Republican Municipal Committee to fill the vacant 1st Ward seat expiring in December 2018 that had been held by Thomas Smith until he resigned from office earlier that month.

In January 2016, the City Council selected James Toto from three names nominated by the Republican municipal committee to fill the 2nd Ward seat expiring in 2017 that was vacated by Maureen Kern when she took office as a member of the Atlantic County Board of Chosen Freeholders. Toto served on an interim basis until the November 2016 general election, when he was elected to serve the balance of the term.

In elections held on November 8, 2011, Jack Glasser defeated Democrat-turned Independent Daniel Gudauskas by 1,650–558, making it the largest margin of victory in a contested election on the municipal level in Somers Point history. Triboletti and Kern ran unopposed in the first and second wards respectively.

=== Federal, state and county representation ===
Somers Point is located in the 2nd Congressional District and is part of New Jersey's 2nd state legislative district.

For the 119th United States Congress, New Jersey's 2nd congressional district is represented by Jeff Van Drew (R, Dennis Township). New Jersey is represented in the United States Senate by Democrats Cory Booker (Newark, term ends 2027) and Andy Kim (Moorestown, term ends 2031).

For the 2026–2027 session, the 2nd legislative district of the New Jersey Legislature is represented in the New Jersey Senate by Vincent J. Polistina (R, Egg Harbor Township) and in the General Assembly by Don Guardian (R, Atlantic City) and Maureen Rowan (D, Atlantic City).

Atlantic County is governed by a directly elected county executive and a nine-member Board of County Commissioners, responsible for legislation. The executive serves a four-year term and the commissioners are elected to staggered three-year terms, of which four are elected from the county on an at-large basis and five of the commissioners represent equally populated districts. As of 2025, Atlantic County's Executive is Dennis Levinson (R, Northfield), whose term of office ends December 31, 2027. Members of the Board of County Commissioners are:

Ernest D. Coursey (D, District 1-- Atlantic City, Egg Harbor Township (part), Longport, Margate City, and Ventnor City; 2025, Atlantic City), Chair Maureen Kern (R, District 2-- Egg Harbor Township (part), Linwood, Northfield, Somers Point and Pleasantville; 2027, Somers Point), Andrew Parker III (R, District 3-- Egg Harbor Township (part) and Hamilton Township (part); 2026, Egg Harbor Township), Richard R. Dase (R, District 4, including Brigantine, Galloway Township, Egg Harbor Township (part), and Port Republic; 2025, Galloway Township), Vice Chair James A. Bertino (R, District 5-- Buena, Buena Vista Township, Corbin City, Egg Harbor City, Estell Manor, Folsom, Hamilton Township (part), Hammonton, Mullica Township and Weymouth Township; 2027, Hammonton), June Byrnes (R, At-Large; 2026, Linwood), Michael Ruffu (R, At-Large; Margate, 2027) Amy L. Gatto (R, At-large; 2025, Hamilton Township) and John W. Risley (R, At-Large; 2026, Egg Harbor Township)

Atlantic County's constitutional officers are: Clerk Joesph J. Giralo (R, 2026, Hammonton), Sheriff Joe O'Donoghue (R, 2026, Egg Harbor Township) and Surrogate James Curcio (R, 2025, Hammonton).

=== Politics ===
As of March 2011, there were a total of 6,619 registered voters in Somers Point City, of which 1,624 (24.5% vs. 30.5% countywide) were registered as Democrats, 1,979 (29.9% vs. 25.2%) were registered as Republicans and 3,009 (45.5% vs. 44.3%) were registered as Unaffiliated. There were 7 voters registered as Libertarians or Greens. Among the city's 2010 Census population, 61.3% (vs. 58.8% in Atlantic County) were registered to vote, including 77.9% of those ages 18 and over (vs. 76.6% countywide).

Gubernatorial election results for Somers Point
Year	Republican		Democratic		Third party(ies)	
Year	No.	%	No.	%	No.	%
2025	1,989	49.51%	1,995	49.66%	33	0.82%
2021	1,913	55.31%	1,520	43.94%	26	0.75%
2017	1,183	45.27%	1,368	52.35%	62	2.37%
2013	1,963	66.54%	938	31.80%	49	1.66%
2009	1,677	52.00%	1,282	39.75%	266	8.25%
2005	1,469	48.21%	1,468	48.18%	110	3.61%

In the 2012 presidential election, Democrat Barack Obama received 2,506 votes (53.5% vs. 57.9% countywide), ahead of Republican Mitt Romney with 2,077 votes (44.4% vs. 41.1%) and other candidates with 53 votes (1.1% vs. 0.9%), among the 4,681 ballots cast by the city's 7,075 registered voters, for a turnout of 66.2% (vs. 65.8% in Atlantic County). In the 2008 presidential election, Democrat Barack Obama received 2,597 votes (51.5% vs. 56.5% countywide), ahead of Republican John McCain with 2,309 votes (45.8% vs. 41.6%) and other candidates with 71 votes (1.4% vs. 1.1%), among the 5,042 ballots cast by the city's 7,120 registered voters, for a turnout of 70.8% (vs. 68.1% in Atlantic County). In the 2004 presidential election, Republican George W. Bush received 2,529 votes (51.2% vs. 46.2% countywide), ahead of Democrat John Kerry with 2,313 votes (46.9% vs. 52.0%) and other candidates with 43 votes (0.9% vs. 0.8%), among the 4,936 ballots cast by the city's 6,642 registered voters, for a turnout of 74.3% (vs. 69.8% in the whole county).

Presidential elections results
Year	Republican	Democratic	Third Parties
2024	52.1% 2,692	46.0% 2,380	1.9% 86
2020	47.8% 2,714	50.8% 2,885	1.4% 81
2016	47.8% 2,148	47.2% 2,120	5.1% 227
2012	44.4% 2,077	53.5% 2,506	1.1% 53
2008	45.8% 2,309	51.5% 2,597	1.4% 71
2004	51.2% 2,529	46.9% 2,313	0.9% 43

In the 2013 gubernatorial election, Republican Chris Christie received 1,963 votes (64.3% vs. 60.0% countywide), ahead of Democrat Barbara Buono with 938 votes (30.7% vs. 34.9%) and other candidates with 49 votes (1.6% vs. 1.3%), among the 3,052 ballots cast by the city's 7,272 registered voters, yielding a 42.0% turnout (vs. 41.5% in the county). In the 2009 gubernatorial election, Republican Chris Christie received 1,677 votes (51.3% vs. 47.7% countywide), ahead of Democrat Jon Corzine with 1,282 votes (39.2% vs. 44.5%), Independent Chris Daggett with 224 votes (6.8% vs. 4.8%) and other candidates with 42 votes (1.3% vs. 1.2%), among the 3,271 ballots cast by the city's 6,794 registered voters, yielding a 48.1% turnout (vs. 44.9% in the county).

United States Senate election results for Somers Point1
Year	Republican		Democratic		Third party(ies)	
Year	No.	%	No.	%	No.	%
2024	2,564	51.97%	2,288	46.37%	82	1.66%
2018	1,889	53.35%	1,516	42.81%	136	3.84%
2012	1,942	44.65%	2,329	53.55%	78	1.79%
2006	1,650	51.45%	1,477	46.06%	80	2.49%

United States Senate election results for Somers Point2
Year	Republican		Democratic		Third party(ies)	
Year	No.	%	No.	%	No.	%
2020	2,642	47.61%	2,817	50.77%	90	1.62%
2014	1,372	50.50%	1,292	47.55%	53	1.95%
2013	841	53.98%	698	44.80%	19	1.22%
2008	2,153	46.33%	2,425	52.18%	69	1.48%

== Historic district ==
- Bay Front Historic District
- U.S. National Register of Historic Places
- U.S. Historic district
- New Jersey Register of Historic Places
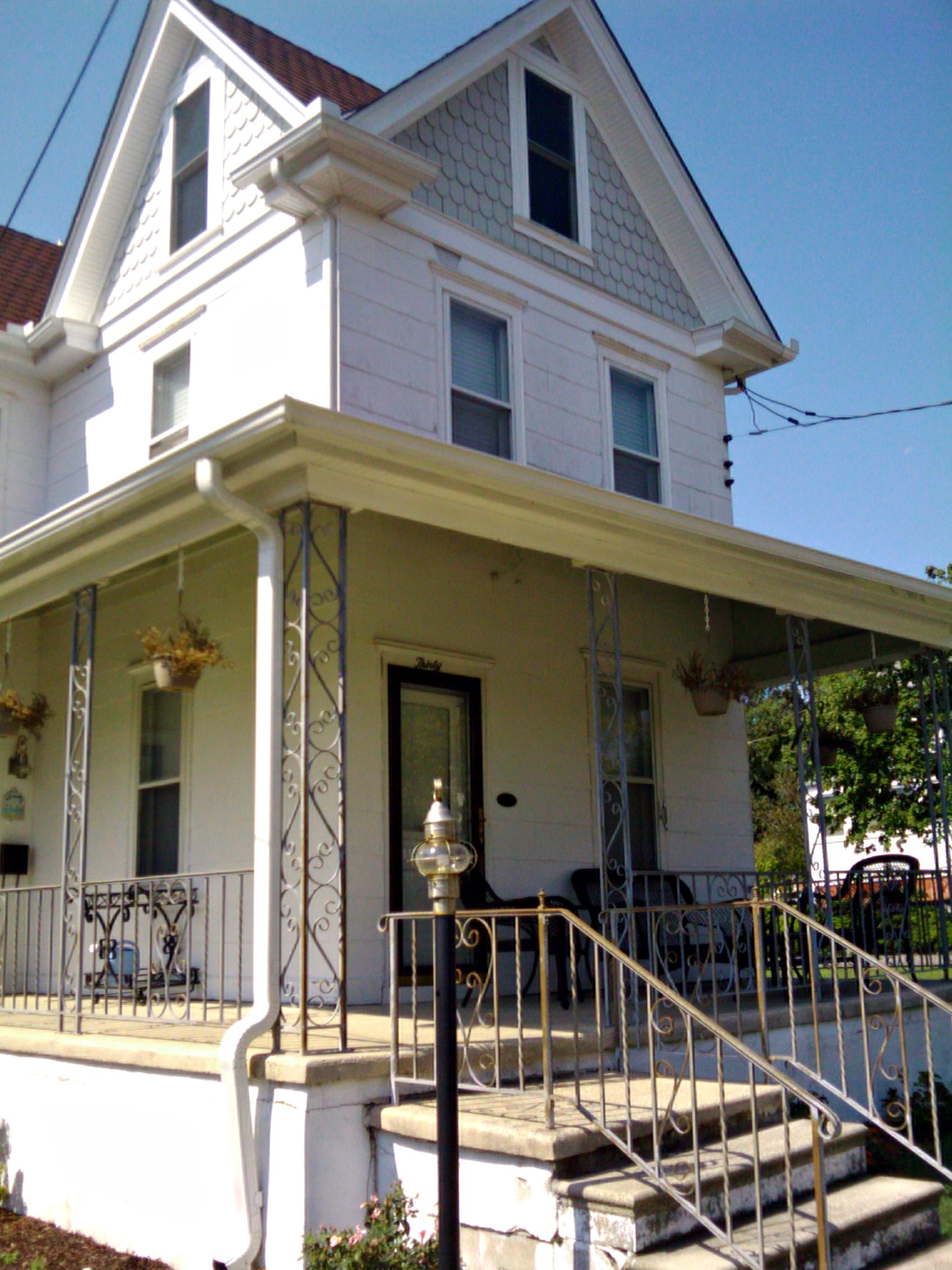
- Location: Roughly bounded by Decatur Avenue, Egg Harbor Bay, George Avenue, and Shore Road
- Area: 82 acres (33 ha)
- Architectural style: Bungalow/craftsman, Stick/eastlake, Cottage
- NRHP reference No.: 89000227
- NJRHP No.: 423

Significant dates
- Added to NRHP: March 22, 1989
- Designated NJRHP: February 9, 1989

The Bay Front Historic District is an 82-acre (33 ha) historic district encompassing an area roughly bounded by Decatur Avenue, Egg Harbor Bay, George Avenue, and Shore Road in the community. It was added to the National Register of Historic Places on March 22, 1989, for its significance in architecture, entertainment/recreation, and social history. The district includes 189 contributing buildings.

== Education ==
Students in kindergarten through eighth grade are served by the Somers Point Public Schools. As of the 2023–24 school year, the district, comprised of three schools, had an enrollment of 763 students and 78.0 classroom teachers (on an FTE basis), for a student–teacher ratio of 9.8:1. The Somers Point School District consists of three school facilities: Jordan Road School, constructed in 1966 with an addition in 1991; Dawes Avenue School, constructed in 1998; and New York Avenue School, constructed in 1914 with an addition in 1922 and a refurbishing project in 2005, which houses preschool and the district's central offices. Schools in the district (with 2023–24 enrollment data from the National Center for Education Statistics) are New York Avenue School with 4 students in pre-kindergarten, Dawes Avenue School with 384 students in grades Kindergarten through 3rd grade and Jordan Road Middle School with 366 students in 4th through 8th grade.

Students in public school for ninth through twelfth grades attend Mainland Regional High School, which also serves students from Linwood and Northfield. The high school is located in Linwood. For the 1997–98 school year, Mainland Regional High School was recognized by the United States Department of Education as a National Blue Ribbon School. As of the 2023–24 school year, the high school had an enrollment of 1,171 students and 106.2 classroom teachers (on an FTE basis), for a student–teacher ratio of 11.0:1.

City public school students are also eligible to attend the Atlantic County Institute of Technology in the Mays Landing section of Hamilton Township or the Charter-Tech High School for the Performing Arts, located in Somers Point.

St. Joseph Regional School is an elementary school serving students in kindergarten through eighth grade, operated under the jurisdiction of the Roman Catholic Diocese of Camden.

== Transportation ==
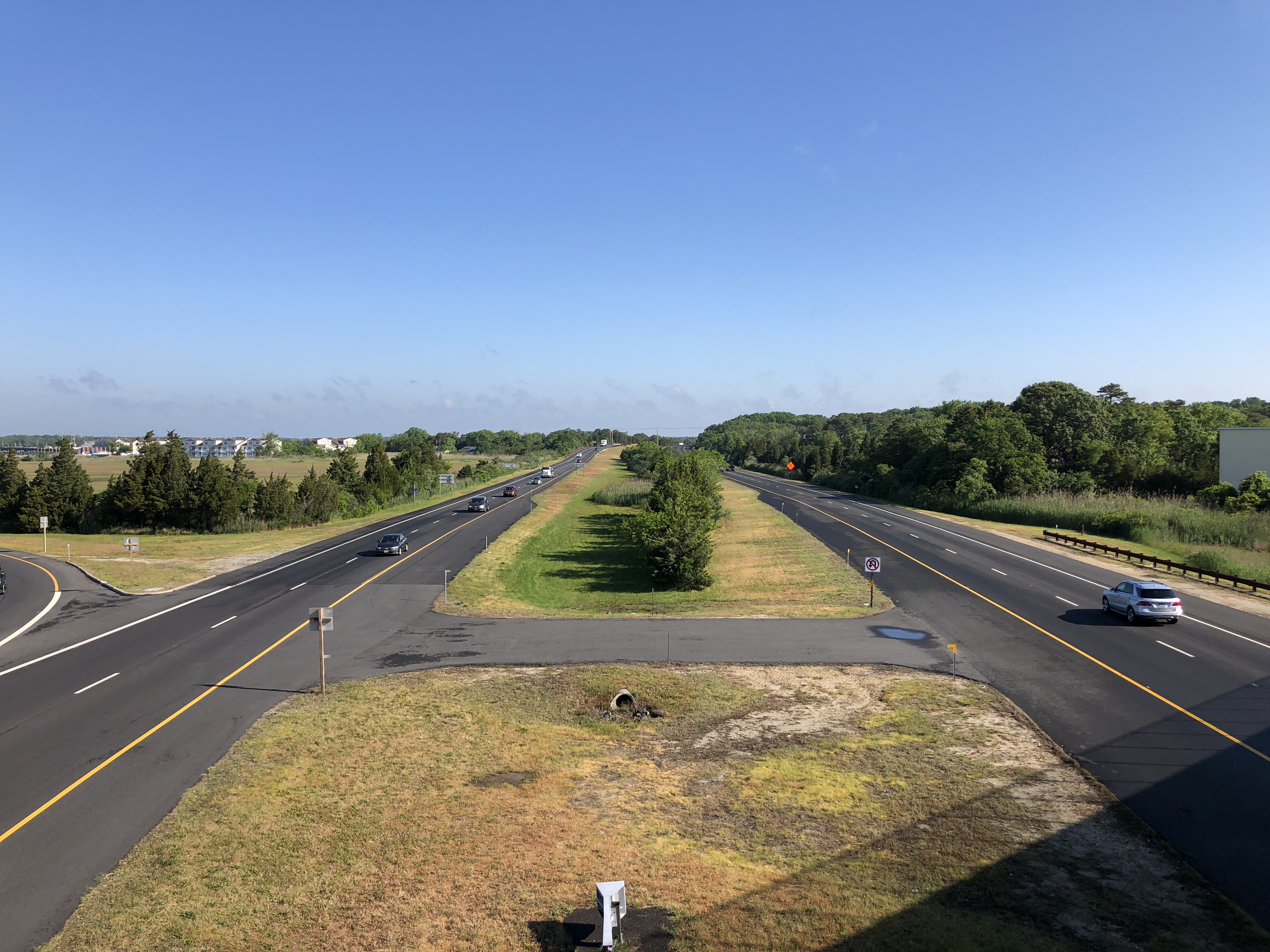
The northbound Garden State Parkway at U.S. Route 9 in Somers Point

=== Roads and highways ===
As of May 2010, the city had a total of 55.39 miles (89.14 km) of roadways, of which 43.19 miles (69.51 km) were maintained by the municipality, 5.45 miles (8.77 km) by Atlantic County and 3.73 miles (6.00 km) by the New Jersey Department of Transportation and 3.02 miles (4.86 km) by the New Jersey Turnpike Authority.

The Garden State Parkway passes through the city, connecting Egg Harbor Township on either side of the city. Interchange 30 for the Parkway is located in the city, signed for Somers Point and Downtown Ocean City.

On the city's southern border, bridges connect to Cape May County via the Garden State Parkway to Upper Township, into Ocean City via Route 52 and over the Beesley's Point Bridge, which has been demolished. As part of a $400 million project completed by the New Jersey Department of Transportation in 2012, a new causeway for Route 52 was completed over Great Egg Harbor Bay, replacing the Howard S. Stainton Memorial Causeway that had been completed in 1933. the Beesley's Point Bridge was demolished in 2013 as part of a project adding a new bridge for traffic on the Parkway.

=== Public transportation ===
NJ Transit offers bus transportation in the city between Ocean City and Atlantic City on the 507 and 509 routes.

== Popular culture ==
The 1983 movie Eddie and the Cruisers was largely filmed in Somers Point, using the defunct Tony Mart's nightclub as a setting.

== Notable people ==
People who were born in, residents of, or otherwise closely associated with Somers Point include:

- Joe Bastardi (born 1955), meteorologist
- Matt Broomall (born 1994), soccer player who played goalkeeper for the Richmond Kickers in USL League One
- Joshua Cohen (born 1980), novelist and story writer, known for his works Witz and Book of Numbers
- Doug Colman (born 1973), former NFL linebacker
- Peter Erskine (born 1954), jazz drummer
- John H. Hamilton Jr. (1919–1986), member of the Pennsylvania House of Representatives
- David Kagen (born 1948), actor who is best known for playing playing Sheriff Mike Garris in the 1986 film Friday the 13th Part VI: Jason Lives
- Joe Maloy (born 1985), triathlete who was chosen to represent the United States in triathlon at the Rio 2016 Summer Olympics
- Osun Osunniyi (born 1998), college basketball player for the St. Bonaventure Bonnies of the Atlantic 10 Conference
- Jennifer Pershing (born 1980), Playboy Playmate of the Month, March 2009
- Cody Stashak (born 1994), professional baseball pitcher for the Minnesota Twins
- John Stone (born 1979), wide receiver who played in the NFL for the Oakland Raiders
- Gregory L. Verdine (born 1959), chemical biologist, university professor, entrepreneur, venture capitalist and business executive

== See also ==
- Richard Somers, a U.S. Navy hero in the First Barbary War.
- Capt. John Jeffries Burial Marker, a marble gravestone that stands 12-feet high in the cemetery of the Palestine Bible Church.
