= Atlantic County Vocational School District =

School district in Atlantic County, New Jersey, US

Address
- 5080 Atlantic Avenue Mays Landing, Atlantic County, New Jersey, 08330; United States
- Coordinates: 39.441835°N 74.691108°W

District information
- Grades: Vocational
- Superintendent: Philip J. Guenther
- Business administrator: Nicholas Brown
- Schools: 1

Students and staff
- Enrollment: 1,800 (as of 2023–24)
- Faculty: 149.5 FTEs
- Student–teacher ratio: 12.0:1

Other information
- District Factor Group: NA
- Website: www.acitech.org
Ind.	Per pupil	District spending	Rank (*)	Vocational average	%± vs. average
1A	Total Spending	$16,663	5	$18,891	−11.8%
1	Budgetary Cost	13,359	4	17,296	−22.8%
2	Classroom Instruction	6,721	2	9,045	−25.7%
6	Support Services	1,377	4	2,269	−39.3%
8	Administrative Cost	1,493	3	2,353	−36.5%
10	Operations & Maintenance	3,160	14	3,014	4.8%
13	Extracurricular Activities	322	9	464	−30.6%
16	Median Teacher Salary	48,404	1	65,035
Data from NJDoE 2014 Taxpayers' Guide to Education Spending. *Of Vocational districts with any number of students. Lowest spending=1; Highest=21

The Atlantic County Vocational School District is a comprehensive vocational public school district serving the vocational and training needs of high school students in ninth through twelfth grades and adults from Atlantic County, in the U.S. state of New Jersey. The district's school is located in the Mays Landing section of Hamilton Township.

As of the 2023–24 school year, the district, comprised of one school, had an enrollment of 1,800 students and 149.5 classroom teachers (on an FTE basis), for a student–teacher ratio of 12.0:1.

== Schools ==
Schools in the district (with 2023–24 enrollment data from the National Center for Education Statistics) are:

- Atlantic County Institute of Technology (ACIT) is a four-year countywide vocational public high school located on a 58-acre (230,000 m^{2}) campus. The school was constructed in 1974 and underwent a major renovation in 1994. The school offers 30 different career programs. Shared-time students attend vocational programs at ACIT for part of the day, while receiving their academic instruction at one of the public high schools in the county. ACIT has articulation agreements with Atlantic Cape Community College, allowing students in certain programs to earn as many as 15 college credits for courses taken at ACIT. The school also has a similar partnership with Camden County College for students in the dental assistant program. (1,805 students in grades 9-12)
  - Joseph Potkay, principal

Atlantic County Alternative High School served students from across the county who had not achieved in a traditional high school setting, offering an individualized program to help students develop academic and job preparation skills. With the sending districts reducing the number of students, the programs was ended by the district.

== Administration ==
Core members of the district's administration are:

- Philip J. Guenther, superintendent
- Nicholas Brown, business administrator and board secretary

== Board of education ==
The district's board of education is comprised of the county superintendent of schools and six public members who set policy and oversee the fiscal and educational operation of the district through its administration. As a Type I school district, the board's trustees are appointed by the appointed to four-year terms of office by the Atlantic County Board of County Commissioners, along with the county superintendent of schools, who serves on an ex officio basis. The board appoints a superintendent to oversee the district's day-to-day operations and a business administrator to supervise the business functions of the district.
