= Shore Medical Center =

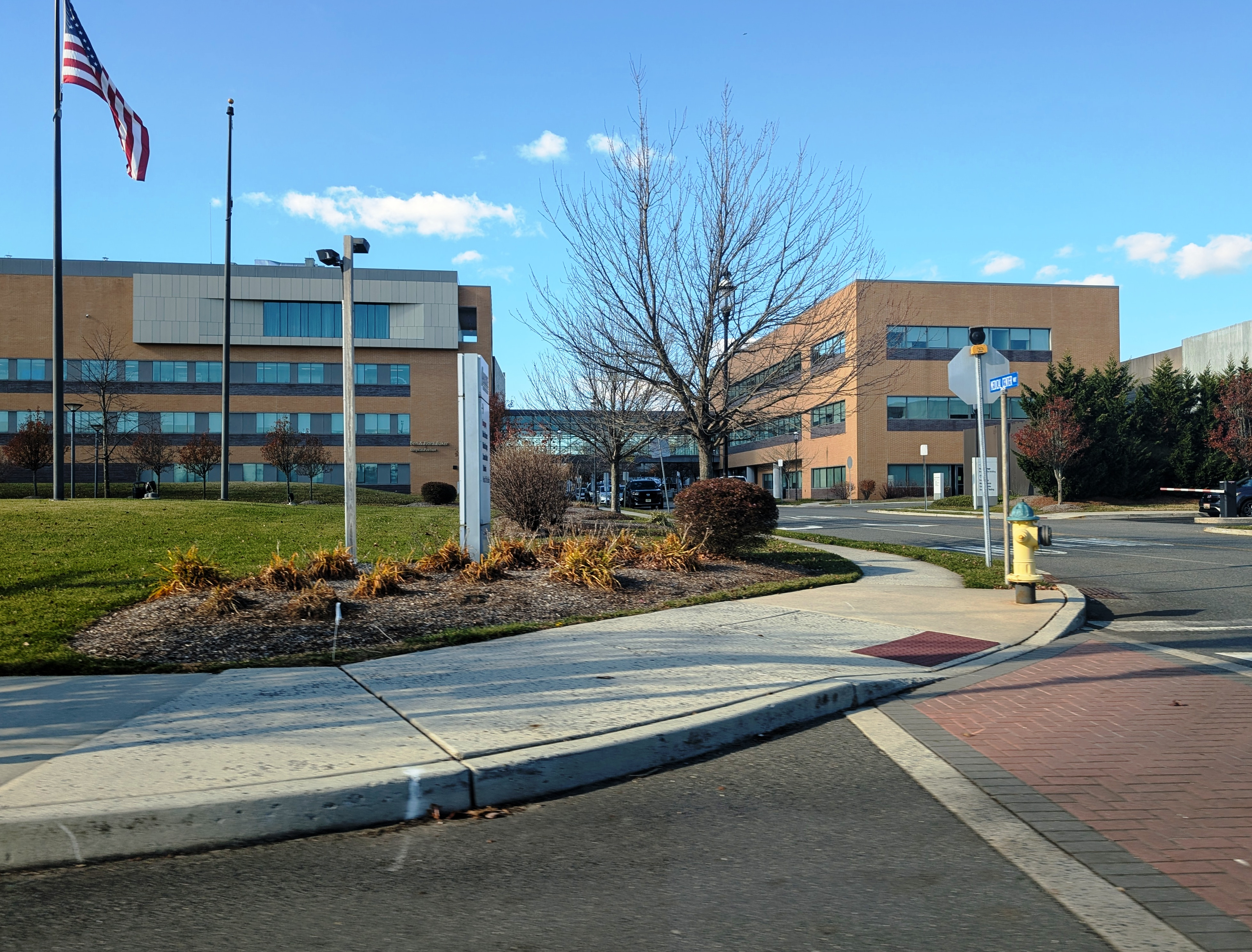
- Hospital as seen from Bay Avenue

Geography
- Location: Somers Point
- Coordinates: 39°18′52″N 74°35′38″W

Services
- Beds: 276

History
- Former name: Shore Memorial Hospital
- Opened: 1928

Shore Medical Center, formerly Shore Memorial Hospital, is a full-service acute care community hospital located in Somers Point, New Jersey, serving Atlantic and Cape May counties.

== History ==
In 1928, Dr. Charles Ernst and Dr. Frank Inksetter built Atlantic Shores Hospital and Sanitarium, a private institute for the treatment of alcohol and drug dependency. The facility – designed in a Spanish Mission style – had 68 beds, and soon after its founding expanded its services for other patients. By 1940, the facility was struggling financially. That year, local citizens purchased the hospital and turned it into a not-for-profit community hospital called Shore Memorial Hospital, under the direction of a board of trustees. The first building added to the original structure was the Shriver Wing in 1954. In 1958, the White Wing was added, increasing the total beds to 155. The Whitby Wing in 1965 increased the beds to 192, and the North Wing in 1970 increased it further to 234 beds. The West Wing, now known as the Howard S. Stainton Pavilion, was added in 1976, which added critical, intensive, post-intensive, and coronary care, as well as increasing the beds to 276. The hospital was the first in South Jersey with CT scan capabilities in 1978.

Another early addition was the Howard S. Stainton Pavilion, named for the Ocean City businessman who helped found the hospital and served on its Board of Governors. The Frances Pew Hayes Tower was added in 1985, and the CardioVascular Institute and freestanding Cancer Center were opened in 2004. In 2011, Shore opened its Pediatric Care Center, the first of its kind in New Jersey, and its state-of-the-art Surgical Pavilion and Campus Expansion. The name of the hospital was then updated to Shore Medical Center.

Today, Shore Medical Center has 196 licensed beds. The hospital employs more than 1,600 employees. Each year, more than 12,000 patients are admitted, 6,000 surgeries are performed, and more than 1,400 babies are born. Shore Medical Center's Emergency Department treats more than 44,000 patients annually.

Shore Medical Center attracts the area's best physicians, nurses and clinicians. Shore Medical Center is home to six Centers of Excellence for Cancer, Cardiovascular, Neurosciences, Spine and Orthopedic, Emergency and Maternity and Pediatric care. Shore's affiliations include Penn Medicine, Onsite Neonatal Partners, Mayo Medical Laboratories, and Advanced Radiology Solutions.

During the COVID-19 pandemic in New Jersey the hospital asked staff for voluntary lay-offs. They were deployed to help elsewhere.
