= Marine Mammal Stranding Center =

US non-profit organization

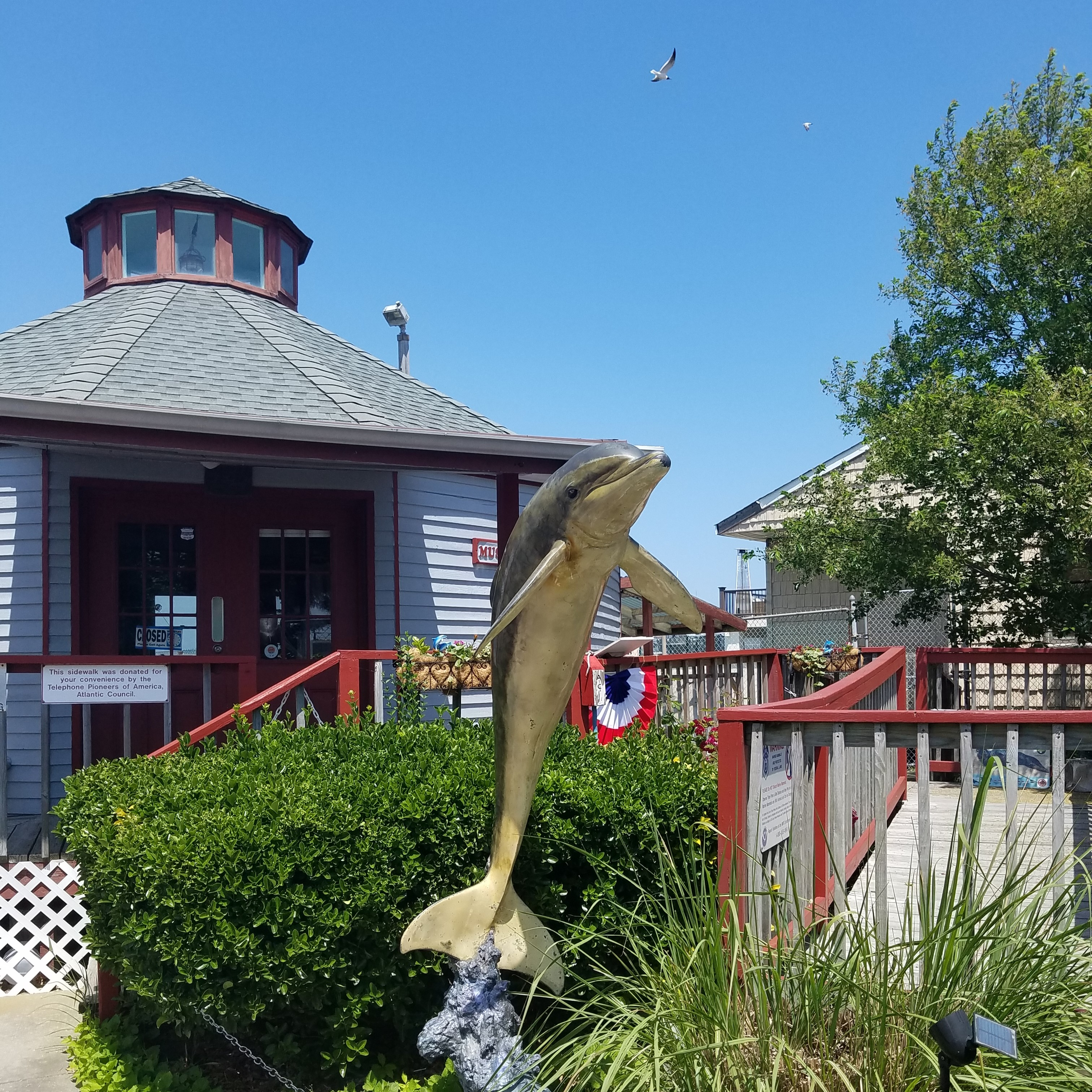
- The Sea Life Museum
- Abbreviation: MMSC
- Formation: 1978; 48 years ago
- Founder: Sheila Dean; Robert Schoelkopf
- Type: 501(c)(3)
- Headquarters: Brigantine, New Jersey
- Coordinates: 39.395°N 74.391°W
- Region served: Northeastern coast of the United States
- Board Chair: Ken Schaffer
- Board President: Robert Schoelkopf
- Director: Sheila Dean
- Website: mmsc.org

The Marine Mammal Stranding Center (established in 1978) is a private non-profit organization located in Brigantine, New Jersey. The Marine Mammal Stranding Center's mission is to rescue, rehabilitate, and release stranded marine mammals and sea turtles. They are the only federally-authorized marine mammal rescue and rehabilitation hospital in New Jersey. Since 1978, the Marine Mammal Stranding Center has responded to more than 6,325 whales, dolphins, seals, and sea turtles in distress along the New Jersey coastline.

In addition to marine mammal stranding response and rehabilitation, the Marine Mammal Stranding Center operates the Sea Life Museum-an educational facility which includes hands-on exhibits, and offers marine ecology–based educational programs. The Stranding Center also offers internship programs.

== Media ==
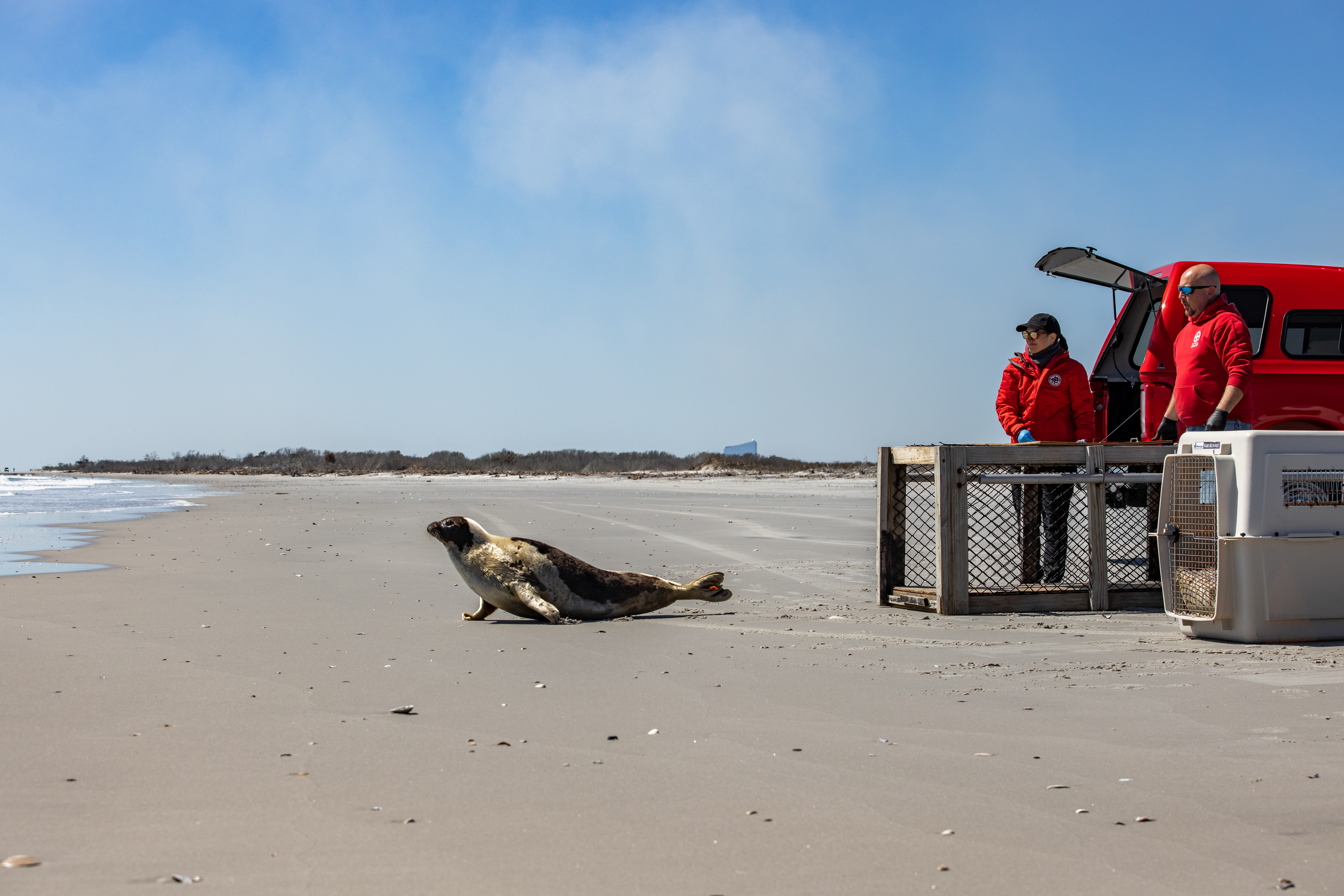
An adult Harp seal is returned to the wild by the MMSC Stranding Team.

External videos
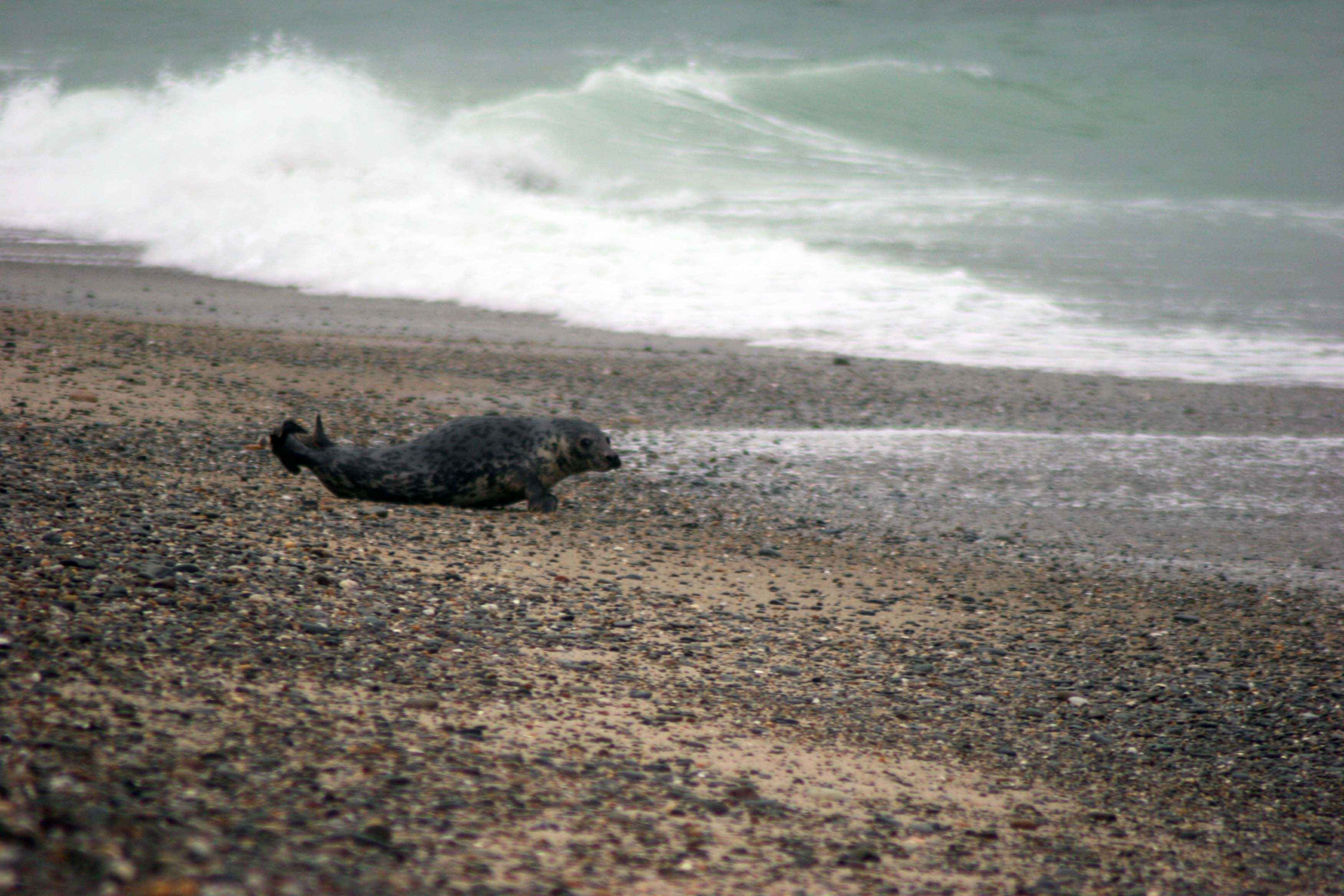
- "Marine Mammal Stranding Center", The Philo Project
- "Report a stranding", Marine Mammal Stranding Center
