= City (New Jersey) =

Form of municipal government in New Jersey

A city in the context of local government in New Jersey refers to one of five types and one of eleven forms of municipal government. Despite the widely held perception of a city as a large, urban area, cities in New Jersey have a confused history as a form of government and vary in size from large, densely populated areas to much smaller hamlets.

== History ==
The 1897 and 1899 city charter laws applied only to areas with a population under 12,000, and provided for a directly elected mayor, who served a two-year term and had strong executive powers. Both featured a council elected from wards to staggered three-year terms, plus one councilman elected at-large for a term of two years. The mayor had a veto power, which could be overridden by a two-thirds vote of the council. The two acts differed in a number of ways, including the process for selection of a board of education (1897: elected; 1899: appointed by the council).

By 1987, there were only eleven cities under these City Acts (including East Orange, which effectively operated under a special City charter). As in other forms, many amendments, revisions and changes had been made over the years, leading to confusing and often conflicting legislation.

The City Act of 1987 provides for a directly elected mayor who serves a four-year term and for a council that consists of seven members; six elected from two wards for staggered three-year terms and one elected at large for a four-year term. There are three councilmen in each ward with one councilmember from each ward up for election every year. The mayor is the chief executive and votes only to break a tie. The Mayor has veto power over all or portions of any ordinance, subject to override by a two-thirds vote of the Council. The Act also provides for the delegation of executive responsibilities to a municipal administrator.

Those cities operating under pre-1987 charters could retain the characteristics of their structure of government regarding terms of office, number of positions and other powers. Provisions of the 1987 Act can then be adopted through a petition and referendum process by the electorate.

== Municipalities ==
There are 52 cities in New Jersey:

- Absecon
- Asbury Park
- Atlantic City
- Bayonne
- Beverly
- Bordentown
- Brigantine
- Bridgeton
- Burlington
- Camden
- Cape May
- Clifton
- Corbin City
- East Orange
- Egg Harbor City
- Elizabeth
- Englewood
- Estell Manor
- Garfield
- Gloucester City
- Hackensack
- Hoboken
- Jersey City
- Lambertville
- Linden
- Linwood
- Long Branch
- Margate City
- Millville
- Newark
- New Brunswick
- Northfield
- North Wildwood
- Ocean City
- Passaic
- Paterson
- Perth Amboy
- Plainfield
- Pleasantville
- Port Republic
- Rahway
- Salem
- Sea Isle City
- Somers Point
- South Amboy
- Summit
- Trenton
- Union City
- Ventnor City
- Vineland
- West Orange
- Wildwood
- Woodbury

== See also ==
- List of municipalities in New Jersey
