= Somers Mansion =

Historic house in New Jersey, US

- U.S. National Register of Historic Places
- New Jersey Register of Historic Places
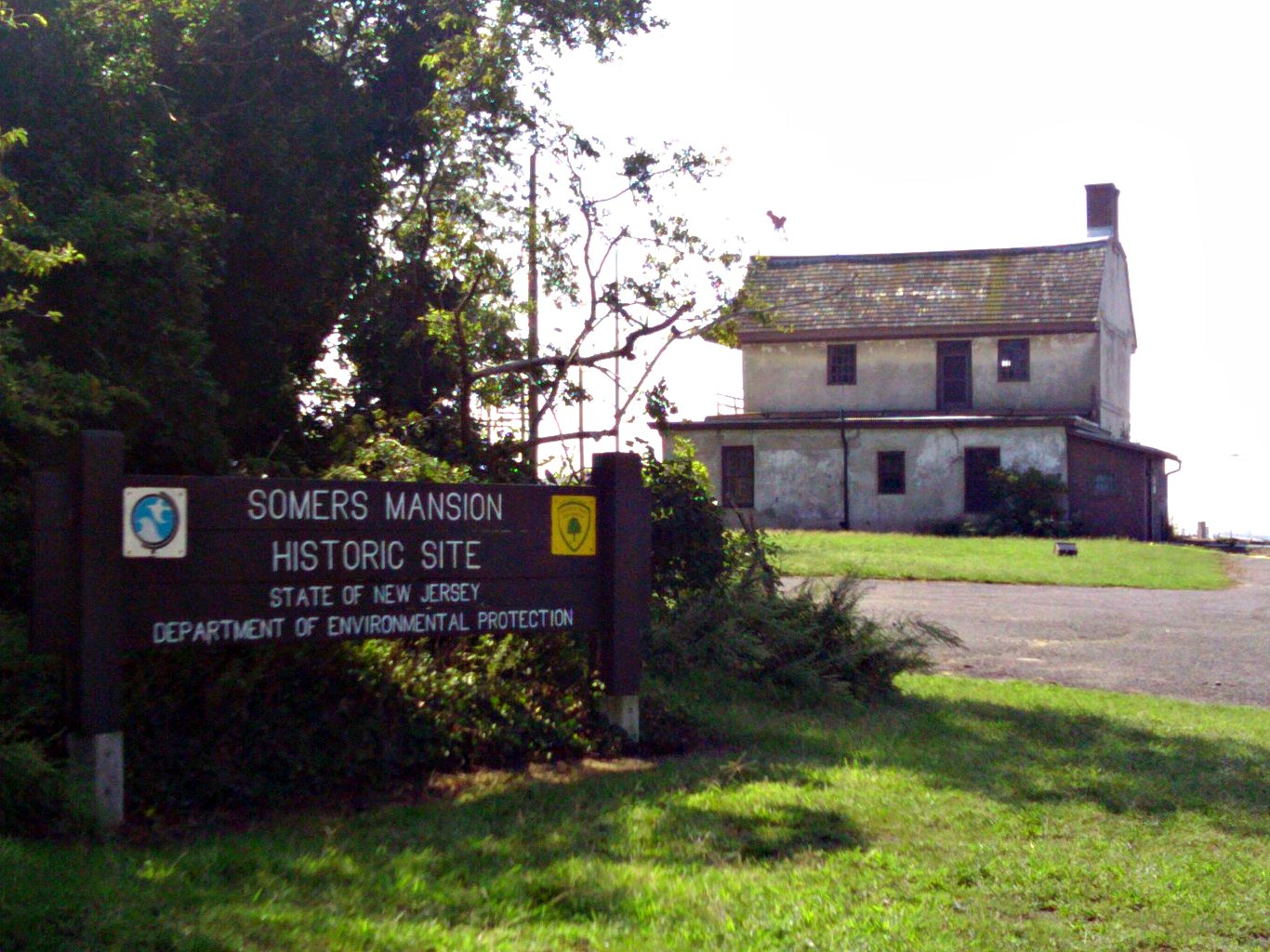

- Location within Atlantic County, New Jersey Location within New Jersey Location within the United States
- Location: Shore Road and Somers Point Circle, Somers Point, New Jersey
- Coordinates: 39.3094°N 74.5984°W
- Area: 1.5 acres (0.61 ha)
- Built: 1725
- NRHP reference No.: 70000378
- NJRHP No.
- Added to NRHP: December 18, 1970

Somers Mansion is a historic house at Shore Road and Somers Point Circle in Somers Point, New Jersey, United States.

It was built in 1725 and added to the National Register of Historic Places in 1970.

== See also ==
- National Register of Historic Places listings in Atlantic County, New Jersey
- List of the oldest buildings in New Jersey
