= Articulation (education) =

Articulation, or more specifically course articulation, is the process of comparing the content of courses that are transferred between postsecondary institutions such as TAFE institutes, colleges or universities. In other words, course articulation is the process by which one institution matches its courses or requirements to coursework completed at another institution. Students rely on course articulation to assure themselves that the courses they have completed or intend to complete will not need to be repeated at the institution to which they are transferring.

Course articulation is distinct from the process of acceptance by one institution of earned credit, from another institution, as applicable towards its degree requirements, i.e. "transferring credit". For example, a university may count units of academic credit earned at a community college towards its minimum number of units for a bachelor's degree. But it might not treat certain previously taken courses as good as its own specific course requirements for a particular major or concentration for that same degree, if the articulation process reveals that the other institution's course curricula are not similar to or not as rigorous as its own course curricula. In that latter situation, a transferring student may discover they cannot graduate until they take courses at the second institution which partially overlap or repeat material they have previously studied at the first one.

Course articulation may be done on an ad hoc basis when a student actually wishes to transfer. It may also be done pursuant to existing course-to-course comparison data, or based on formal articulation agreements. In the last case, representatives of each institution compare their respective course curricula, to determine which courses are comparable and which are not. Their consensus is then formalized in a written agreement which is used by students and advisors and is regularly updated according to a mutual schedule. To be clear, the articulation process determines which courses at the first institution are merely "comparable" to or can be accepted "in lieu of" the second institution's own courses. It is not about determining which courses are "equivalent".

Articulation agreements are notoriously difficult to keep up-to-date where one institution (usually a research university) is significantly larger and more prestigious than the other one (usually a junior college, community college, or liberal arts college) and the field of study at issue is evolving very rapidly (especially science, technology, engineering, and mathematics). The larger and more prestigious institution is constantly revising and improving its course curricula to keep up with cutting-edge developments, meaning that inbound transfers from smaller and less prestigious institutions are always aiming at a moving target on the basis of coursework at their prior institution which may be several years behind the state of the art.

Articulation between institutions with different academic terms is particularly difficult. For example, an institution on the quarter system may have three first-year courses in a subject, while an institution on a semester system may have two first-year courses. While both might cover approximately the same material by the end of one academic year, they may tackle subtopics in a different order, meaning that a student who transfers without taking the entire sequence at one institution will have significant knowledge gaps.

Although credit transfer can be conducted between education bodies in separate countries, the process of articulation can become very complicated when students transfer courses earned at multiple and international campuses, transfer courses from more than 5–10 years ago, or have alternative credit experiences such as exam or military credit.

== See also ==
- College transfer
