= Atlantic County Institute of Technology =

High school in Atlantic County, New Jersey, US

Location
- Main Campus: 5080 Atlantic Avenue; South Wing: 1470 19th Street; Mays Landing, Atlantic County, New Jersey, New Jersey 08330; United States; 39.4426°N 74.6966°W

Information
- Former names: Atlantic County Vocational Technical School
- Type: vocational public high school
- Motto: "Pursue what you love"
- Established: 1974
- School district: Atlantic County Vocational School District
- NCES School ID: 340099000034
- Principal: Brian Rovani
- Faculty: 150.3 FTEs
- Enrollment: 1,852 (as of 2024–25)
- Student to teacher ratio: 12.3:1
- Colors: Black; Cardinal; Gold
- Athletics conference: Cape-Atlantic League
- Team name: Red Hawks
- Website: www.acitech.org

The Atlantic County Institute of Technology (ACIT) is a four-year countywide vocational public high school serving students in ninth through twelfth grades from Atlantic County, in the U.S. state of New Jersey, as part of the Atlantic County Vocational School District. ACIT is located on a 58-acre (230,000 m^{2}) campus in the Mays Landing area of Hamilton Township. The school was constructed in 1974 and underwent a major renovation in 1994 and 2009–2011. The school constructed a new building, with the project beginning in 2023 and being completed in 2026.

As of the 2024–2025 school year, the school had an enrollment of 1,852 students and 150.3 classroom teachers (on an FTE basis), for a student–teacher ratio of 12.3:1. There were 957 students (51.7% of enrollment) eligible for free lunch and 203 (11.0% of students) eligible for reduced-cost lunch.

The school offers 16 career programs, also known as Academies. As of the 2016–2017 school year, the Academy of Aviation Studies was introduced and students in the program are bused to Atlantic Cape Community College daily. The students in the Aviation program take regular high school courses within the school. ACIT has articulation agreements with Atlantic Cape Community College, allowing students in certain programs to earn as many as 15 college credits for courses taken at ACIT. The school has a similar partnership with Camden County College for students in the dental assistant program.

On May 2026, the school opened a brand-new 130,000-square-foot building, known as the Career & Technical Education (CTE) Building. This was a $53.5 million investment that will allow for an additional 450 students to attend each year. The three-story building features 16 specialized CTE labs and shared learning spaces designed to reflect today’s workplaces.

== Awards, recognition and rankings ==
During the 2008–2009 school year, Atlantic County Institute of Technology was recognized with the Blue Ribbon School Award of Excellence by the United States Department of Education, the highest award an American school can receive.

Schooldigger.com ranked the school 29th out of 396 public high schools statewide in its 2013 rankings (an increase of 9 positions from the 2012 ranking), which were based on the combined percentage of students classified as proficient or above on the mathematics (95.0%) and language arts literacy (100.0%) components of the High School Proficiency Assessment (HSPA).

The Atlantic County Institute of Technology was recognized in the National Rankings of Best High Schools by U.S. News & World Report and was awarded a bronze medal "based on their performance on state assessments and how well they prepare students for college."

== Athletics ==
The Atlantic County Institute of Technology Red Hawks compete in the Cape-Atlantic League, an athletic conference comprised of public and private high school in Atlantic, Cape May, Cumberland and Gloucester counties, which operates under the aegis of the New Jersey State Interscholastic Athletic Association (NJSIAA). With 1,222 students in grades 10–12, the school was classified by the NJSIAA for the 2019–20 school year as Group IV for most athletic competition purposes, which included schools with an enrollment of 1,060 to 5,049 students in that grade range.

== Administration ==
The school's principal is Brain Rovani. His administration team includes three assistant principals.
