= Charter-Tech High School for the Performing Arts =

Charter high school in Atlantic County, New Jersey, US

Chartertech High School for the Performing Arts

Address
- 413 New Road Somers Point, Atlantic County, New Jersey, 08205; United States
- Coordinates: 39.327295°N 74.59792°W

District information
- Grades: Charter
- Established: 1999
- Superintendent: Brian McGuire
- Business administrator: Jill Carson
- Schools: 1

Students and staff
- Enrollment: 253 (as of 2024–25)
- Faculty: 41.0 FTEs
- Student–teacher ratio: 6.2:1

Other information
- Website: www.chartertech.org
Ind.	Per pupil	District spending	Rank (*)	Charter average	%± vs. average
1A	Total Spending	$16,223	39	$18,047	−10.1%
1	Budgetary Cost	15,265	66	13,238	15.3%
2	Classroom Instruction	7,036	39	7,328	−4.0%
6	Support Services	1,950	56	1,661	17.4%
8	Administrative Cost	2,512	47	2,563	−2.0%
10	Operations & Maintenance	3,767	76	1,661	126.8%
16	Median Teacher Salary	49,861	35	50,669
Data from NJDoE 2013 Taxpayers' Guide to Education Spending. *Of Charter districts with any number of students. Lowest spending=1; Highest=77

Chartertech High School for the Performing Arts

Information
- Type: Charter public high school
- NCES School ID: 340001900269
- Principal: Brian McGuire
- Faculty: 41.0 FTEs
- Grades: 9–12
- Enrollment: 253 (as of 2024–25)
- Student to teacher ratio: 6.2:1
- Colors: red orange yellow green Blue purple
- Nickname: CTECH

Chartertech High School for the Performing Arts is a public charter high school for students in ninth through twelfth grades in Somers Point, Atlantic County, in the U.S. state of New Jersey, that focuses on education in the performing arts. The school operates independently of the local school district under a charter granted by the New Jersey Department of Education.

As of the 2024–25 school year, the school had an enrollment of 253 students and 41.0 classroom teachers (on an FTE basis), for a student–teacher ratio of 6.2:1. There were 161 students (63.6% of enrollment) eligible for free lunch and 28 (11.1% of students) eligible for reduced-cost lunch.

== History ==
The school opened in 1999 under a charter granted by the New Jersey Department of Education.

The Somers Point Planning Board approved a proposal in April 2010 that had been submitted by the school under which the school would spend $4 million to construct additional classrooms and a gymnasium to be completed before the conclusion of the 2011–12 school year that would allow Chartertech to accommodate as many as 400 students. Although being a performing arts high school, it took over 24 years to build a proper stage.

== Awards, recognition and rankings ==
The school was the 179th-ranked public high school in New Jersey out of 339 schools statewide in New Jersey Monthly magazine's September 2014 cover story on the state's "Top Public High Schools".

== Administration ==
Core members of the school's administration are:

- Brian McGuire, lead person/principal, dean of students, director of special education
- Additional members include two vice principals.
