= 2025 Atlantic City mayoral election =

Local election in New Jersey, US

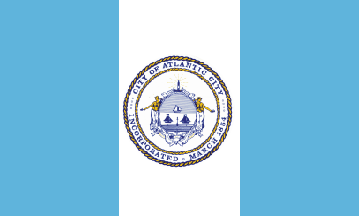
- November 4, 2025
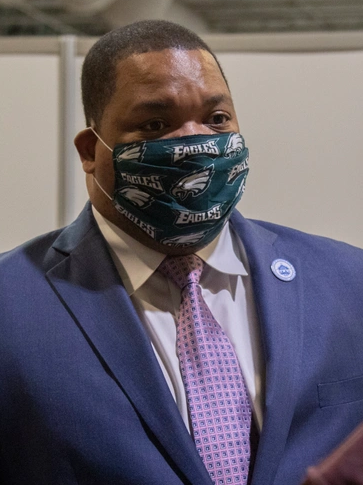

| Candidate | Marty Small Sr. | Naeem Ahmad Khan |
| Party | Democratic | Republican |
| Popular vote | 4,748 | 2,851 |
| Percentage | 62.48% | 37.52% |
Mayor before election
Marty Small Sr.
Democratic
Elected Mayor
Marty Small Sr.
Democratic

The 2025 Atlantic City mayoral election was held on November 4, 2025 to elect the mayor of Atlantic City, New Jersey. Incumbent Democrat Marty Small Sr. won against Republican Naeem Ahmed Khan.

== Background ==
Marty Small Sr. was appointed mayor in 2019 after the resignation of Frank Gilliam. He later won a special election in 2020 for the remainder of the term. He won re-election in 2021, and announced he would seek a second full term as early as October 2023, more two years before the election.

Small will head to trial on November 10, 2025, just six days after the election, on charges that claim he and his wife — who is also the city's school district superintendent — emotionally and physically abused their teenage daughter.

According to prosecutors, the state has offered Small a plea deal on third-degree aggravated assault charges and, though it was not a condition of the offer, by law, Small would have to forfeit his office, as a person convicted of a third-degree or higher crime in New Jersey cannot hold public office. In early 2025, Small pleaded not guilty to a witness tampering charge that claimed he had asked his daughter to lie about the abuse she allegedly suffered at the hands of her parents.

== Democratic primary ==
=== Candidates ===
==== Nominee ====
- Marty Small Sr., incumbent mayor

==== Eliminated in primary ====
- Bob McDevitt, former president of UNITE HERE Local 54

=== Results ===
2025 Atlantic City Democratic Party mayoral primary results
| Party | Candidate | Votes | % |
|---|---|---|---|
| Democratic | Marty Small Sr. (incumbent) | 2,840 | 62.73% |
| Democratic | Bob McDevitt | 1,687 | 37.27% |
| Total votes | | 4,527 | 100.00% |

== Republican primary ==
=== Candidates ===
==== Nominee ====
- Naeem Ahmed Khan, businessman

=== Results ===
2025 Atlantic City Republican Party mayoral primary results
| Party | Candidate | Votes | % |
|---|---|---|---|
| Republican | Naeem Ahmed Khan | 455 | 100.00% |
| Total votes | | 455 | 100.00% |

== General election ==
=== Results ===
2025 Atlantic City mayoral election results
| Party | Candidate | Votes | % |
|---|---|---|---|
| Democratic | Marty Small Sr. (incumbent) | 4,748 | 62.48% |
| Republican | Naeem Ahmed Khan | 2,851 | 37.52% |
| Total votes | | 7,599 | 100.00% |
