= Tom Foley (New Jersey politician) =

American politician

Member of the New Jersey House of Representatives from the 2nd district
- In office January 11, 1994 – January 9, 1996
- Preceded by: Frederick P. Nickles
- Succeeded by: Kenneth LeFevre

Personal details
- Party: Democrat (before 2022); Republican (2022-present)
- Profession: Fire fighter

Tom Foley is an American politician from New Jersey who served as a Democrat in the New Jersey General Assembly representing the 2nd district from 1994 to 1996.

== Biography ==
Foley served as an Atlantic City Fire Department battalion chief, an Atlantic County freeholder and as a city councilman in Pleasantville prior to his election to assembly.

Foley was elected to the New Jersey General Assembly as a Democrat in 1993 defeating incumbent Republican Frederick P. Nickles by just 331 votes. Foley would be defeated in his re-election bid in 1995 by Republican Francis J. Blee who won by 3,060 votes. In 1999, Foley stood for Atlantic County Executive, losing to Republican Dennis Levinson by 2,523 votes, 53%-47%.

In, 2020 Foley announced his support for Donald Trump during the 2020 United States Presidential Election. Foley made clear that his support for Trump was purely on a local level, due to Trump's heavy investment into Atlantic City in the form of Trump Plaza Hotel and Casino, which Foley claims created 50,000 jobs. Foley also voices support for Republican Jeff Van Drew who switched party affiliation during this time.

On January 28, 2021, Foley attempted to stage a political comeback, announcing he would be challenging incumbent Mayor of Atlantic City, Marty Small Sr. in the Democratic primaries for the 2021 Atlantic City mayoral election. Foley would gain the backing of the Atlantic City Democratic organization and voiced support for Donald Trump while Small was supported by Governor Phil Murphy. Describing himself as a "true Democrat" Foley named Aaron Carrington, Suhel Ahmed and Shameeka Harvey as his picks for city council, however, he and his slate would be defeated by Small's.

Shortly after his defeat in the primaries Foley announced on October 26, 2022, that he was switching his party affiliation from Democratic to Republican citing the Democratic party making "decisions that run counter to previous societal norms," and pursuing policies "counter to the American way of life."
