= Stoy (surname) =

Stoy is a surname. Notable people with the surname include:

- Franklin Pierce Stoy (1854–1911), Mayor of Atlantic City, New Jersey from 1900 to 1911
- Joe Stoy, British computer scientist
