= 2021 Atlantic City mayoral election =

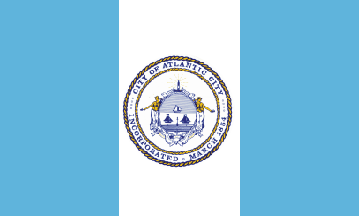
- November 2, 2021
Nominee	Marty Small Sr.	Tom Forkin	Daud Panah
Party	Democratic	Republican
Popular vote	3,390	1,305	380
Percentage	54.2%	20.8%	6.08%
Nominee	Steven Layman	Moisse Delgado	Jimmy Whitehead
Popular vote	578	393	202
Percentage	9.25%	6.29%	3.23%
Mayor before election
Marty Small Sr.
Democratic
Elected mayor
Marty Small Sr.
Democratic

The 2021 Atlantic City mayoral election was held on November 2, 2021, to elect the Mayor of Atlantic City, New Jersey. Primary elections were held on June 7. Incumbent Democrat Marty Small Sr., who was running for a full term after being elected to the mayor position by City Council following Frank Gilliam's resignation, won re-election to his first full term against Republican opponent Tom Forkin and several other opponents running third-party.

== Background ==
Following the arrest of mayor Frank Gilliam in 2019, then-Councilman Marty Small became the acting mayor of Atlantic City in a 8–0 vote by the City Council.

Small would face competition in the Democratic primary against Tom Foley, a former freeholder and member of the New Jersey general assembly. Both candidates would put forward their picks for city council, with Small selecting incumbent George Tibbitt, his treasurer Stephanie Marshal, and his aide Bruce Weekes while Foley picked Aaron Carrington, Suhel Ahmed and Shameeka Harvey running as self-described "true democrats." Foley and his slate would win to face off against Republican Tom Forkin.

The 2021 election was held to determine the next mayor of Atlantic City. Small ran against a largely divided opposition and won a majority of the 6,248 ballots cast in the election. Tom Forkin won the 6th Ward, which includes the Lower Chelsea and Chelsea Heights neighborhoods.
