= Diedrich Bader =

American actor (born 1966)

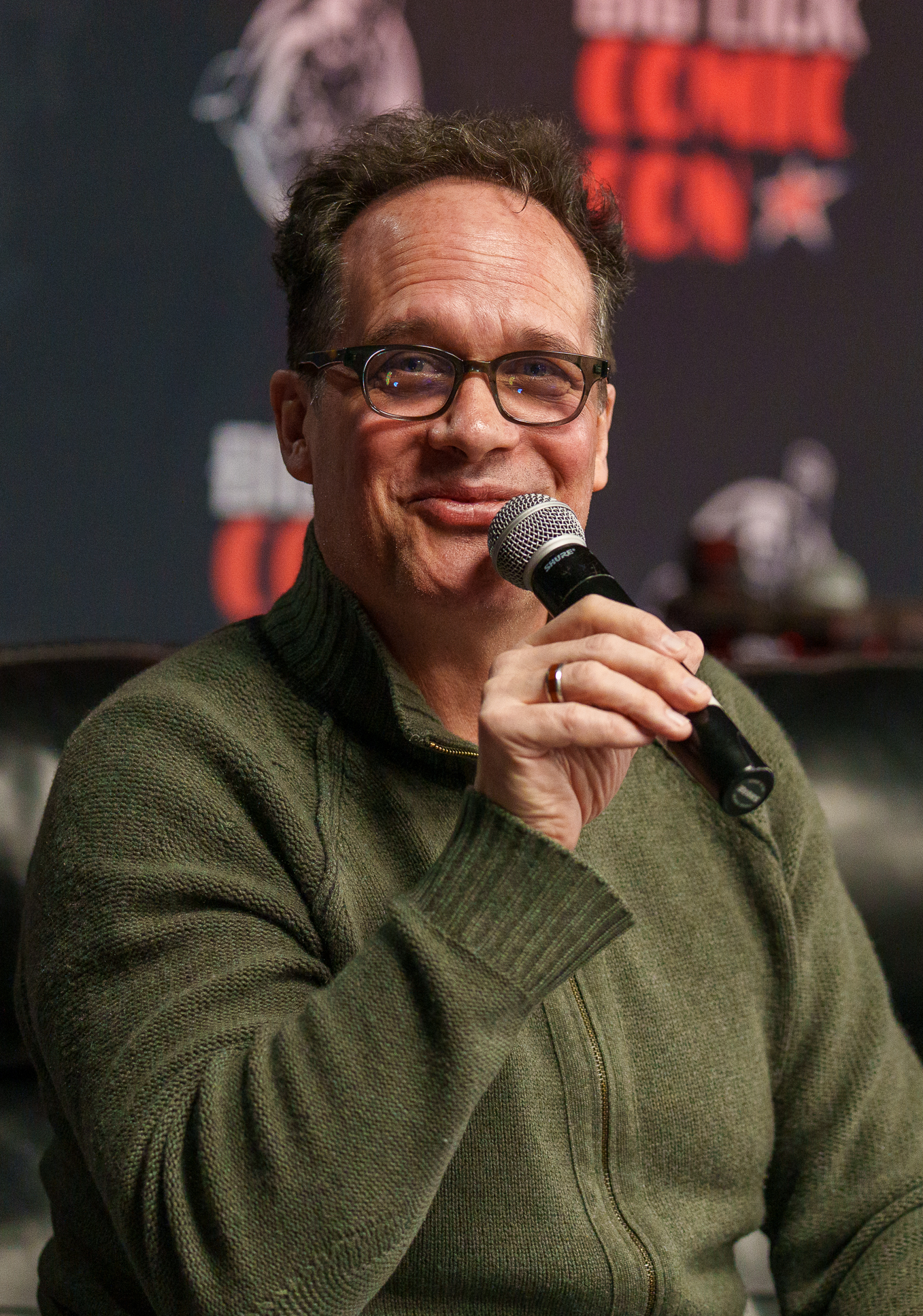
- Bader at Big Lick Comic Con in Roanoke, Virginia in 2026
- Born: Karl Diedrich Bader; December 24, 1966 (age 59); Alexandria, Virginia, U.S.
- Education: University of North Carolina School of the Arts
- Occupations: Actor; comedian
- Years active: 1988–present
- Agent(s): VOX, Inc.
- Spouse: Dulcy Rogers (m. 1997)
- Children: 2
- Parents: William B. Bader (father); Gretta Bader (mother)
- Relatives: Edward L. Bader (great-grandfather)

Karl Diedrich Bader (born December 24, 1966) is an American actor and comedian. He is best known for his comedic and voice acting roles. He has appeared as a series regular in television sitcoms The Drew Carey Show, American Housewife and Outsourced, along with recurring roles in Better Things and Veep. His film credits include The Beverly Hillbillies (1993), Office Space (1999) and Napoleon Dynamite (2004).

He has had a prolific voice-over career, playing characters such as Hoss Delgado in The Grim Adventures of Billy & Mandy, Zeta in The Zeta Project, Tank Evans in the films Surf's Up and Surf's Up 2: WaveMania, Dr. Meridian/Mandroid in Transformers: EarthSpark, and provided the voice of Bruce Wayne / Batman in multiple animated films and television series, beginning in 2008 with Batman: The Brave and the Bold.

== Early life and education ==
Karl Diedrich Bader was born in Alexandria, Virginia, on Christmas Eve, 1966, the son of Gretta Bader (née Margaret Marie Lange; 1931–2014), a sculptor, and William B. Bader (1931–2016), a foundation executive and political activist. His patrilineal great-grandfather was Edward L. Bader, who served as the mayor of Atlantic City, New Jersey. He is of German and Scottish descent.

When Bader was two years old, his family moved to Paris. As a child, Bader performed impersonations of Charlie Chaplin, which he later described as an early influence on his comedic sensibility. He returned to the U.S. to attend Groveton High School. He graduated from T.C. Williams High School in Alexandria, Virginia, and attended college at the University of North Carolina School of the Arts.

== Career ==
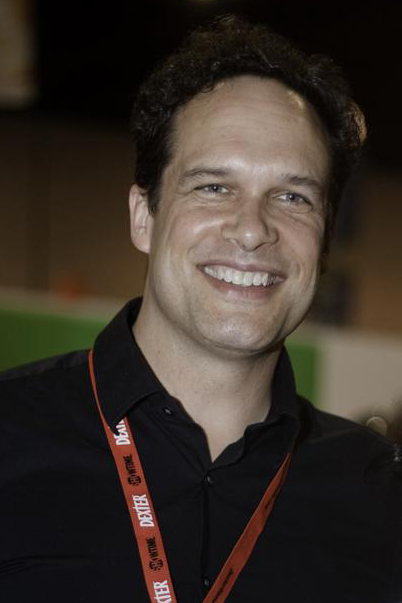
Bader at the 2010 Comic-Con

After a few guest roles on popular television series such as The Fresh Prince of Bel-Air, Star Trek: The Next Generation, Quantum Leap, Diagnosis: Murder, and Cheers, Bader's first major role was in the 1993 series Danger Theatre, playing The Searcher. He moved into cinema acting for the 1993 film version of The Beverly Hillbillies, and returned to television, playing Oswald on The Drew Carey Show starting in 1995. He appeared in the 1999 film Office Space as Peter's neighbor Lawrence, and in the 2004 film Napoleon Dynamite as Rex, the owner of a Taekwondo dojang. He performs in the 2004 film Eurotrip as a thief. In 2010, Bader took the role of Charlie on the television series Outsourced.

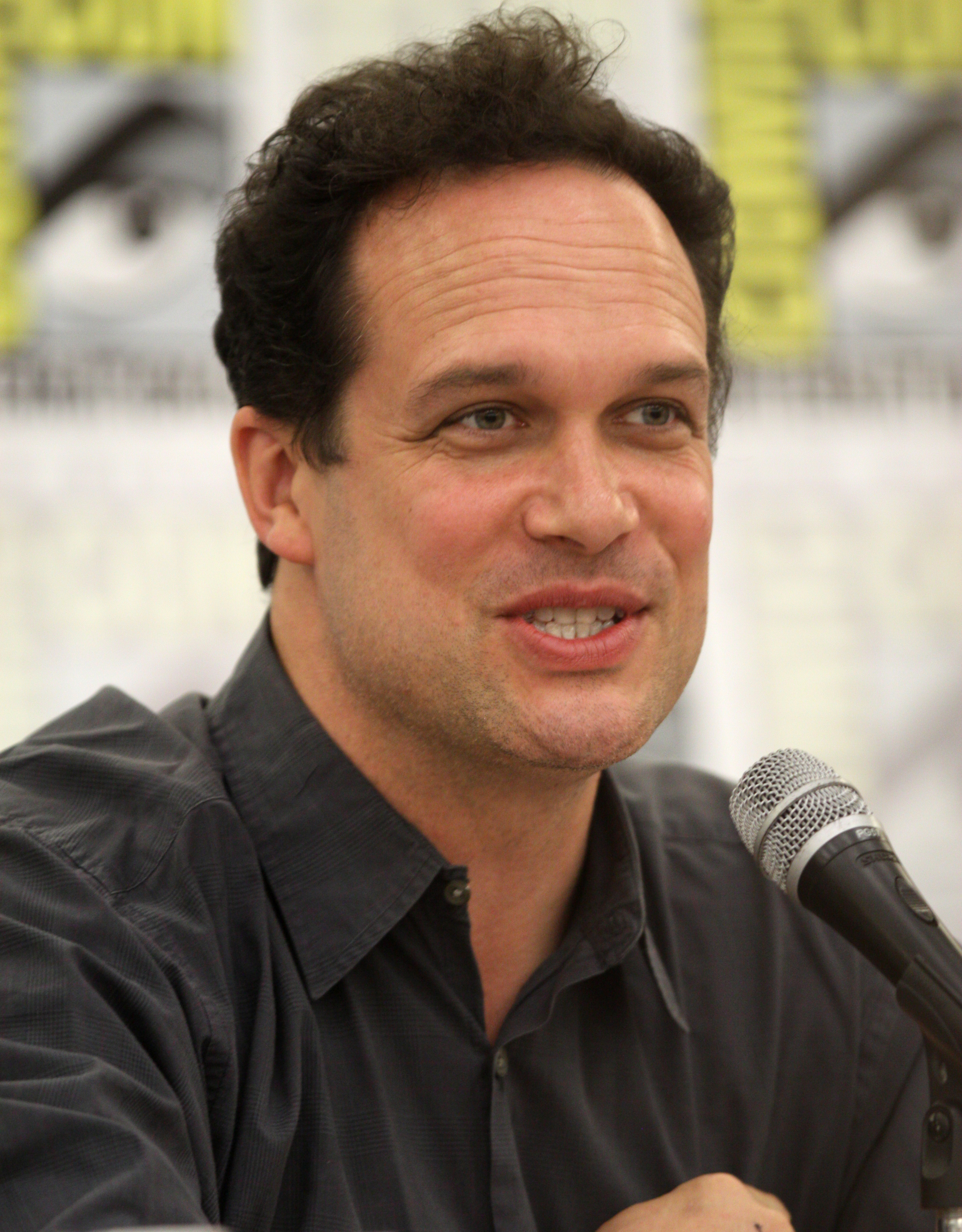
Bader in 2011

As a voice actor, he has voiced various characters in animated features, television series and video games, such as Ice Age, The Simpsons, Buzz Lightyear of Star Command, The Grim Adventures of Billy & Mandy, South Park and The Penguins of Madagascar. In 2012, he reprised his role as Rex in the animated TV series Napoleon Dynamite. He played the Russian Cosmonaut Yuri in Disney's Space Buddies. Bader has lent his voice to several different Batman cartoons, portraying both heroes and villains: Batman Beyond, The Zeta Project, The Batman, and starring as the title character Bruce Wayne / Batman in Batman: The Brave and the Bold and Harley Quinn. Bader also voices Guy Gardner in Green Lantern: The Animated Series.

His other voice credits include JLA Adventures: Trapped in Time, Judah Mannowdog in BoJack Horseman, the android Zeta in The Zeta Project, and Fiskerton in The Secret Saturdays.

In 2016, Bader starred in the "It's the Obvious Choice" series of Time Warner Cable television commercials and starred as Greg Otto in ABC sitcom American Housewife from 2016 to 2021. From 2014 to 2019, Bader had a recurring role on HBO sitcom Veep. From 2016 to 2022, Bader has had a recurring role as Sam's best friend, Rich, on Better Things.

== Personal life ==
Bader has been married to actress Dulcy Rogers since May 1997. They have two children.

Bader predominately lives in Hancock Park, Los Angeles. In 2017, he listed a townhouse he owns for rent.

Bader supported Libertarian candidate Gary Johnson during the 2016 United States presidential election. In 2020, he endorsed Joe Biden in the 2020 presidential election, after initially voting for Elizabeth Warren in the 2020 Democratic Party presidential primaries. In 2024, he endorsed Vice President Kamala Harris in the 2024 presidential election.

== Filmography ==
=== Live-action ===
==== Film ====
Year	Title	Role	Notes
1988	Longarm	Randy	Television film
1988	Desert Rats	Mort	Television film
1989	The Preppie Murder	Peter	Television film
1990	Arduous Man		Short film
1993	The Beverly Hillbillies	Jethro Bodine / Jethrine Bodine	
1994	Teresa's Tattoo	Higgins	
1996	The Assassination File	Scott McDonough	Television film
1999	Office Space	Lawrence	
2000	Certain Guys	Ronald	
2000	Couple Days... A Period Piece	Josh	
2001	Jay and Silent Bob Strike Back	Miramax Security Guard Gordon	
2002	The Country Bears	Officer Cheets	
2003	Evil Alien Conquerors	My-ik	
2004	Napoleon Dynamite	Rex	
2004	EuroTrip	Mugger	
2004	Dead & Breakfast	Chef Henri	
2005	Untitled Oakley & Weinstein Project	Lt. Peter Fontaine	Television film
2005	Miss Congeniality 2: Armed and Fabulous	Joel	
2006	Cattle Call	Glenn Dale	
2007	Cook Off!	Del Crawford	
2007	Sunny & Share Love You	Mr. Jami	
2007	Balls of Fury	Randy Daytona's Concubine Companion	
2008	Skip Tracer	Parker Tuffey	Television film
2008	Meet the Spartans	Traitoro	
2009	Space Buddies	Yuri	Direct-to-video
2009	Calvin Marshall	Fred Deerfield	
2010	Vampires Suck	Frank Crane	
2012	Atlas Shrugged: Part II	Quentin Daniels	
2012	Sassy Pants	Dale Pinto	
2013	Playdate	Mitchell	Direct-to-video
2013	The Starving Games	President Snowballs	
2013	I Know That Voice	Himself	Documentary
2014	Muffin Top: A Love Story	Michael Nicholson	
2015	All She Wishes	Patrick O'Dea	
2019	Phoenix, Oregon	Kyle	
2019	Jay and Silent Bob Reboot	Relentless Security Guard	Cameo
2022	The Blackening	Officer White	
2022	Weird: The Al Yankovic Story	Grizzled Narrator	
2023	Shazam! Fury of the Gods	Mr. Geckle	Cameo
2024	The 4:30 Movie	Damocles	
2024	Holiday Touchdown: A Chiefs Love Story	Hank Higman	Television film

==== Television ====
Year	Title	Role	Notes
1989	Star Trek: The Next Generation	Tactical Crewman	Episode: "The Emissary" (credited as Dietrich Bader)
1989	Living Dolls		Episode: "Martha Means Well"
1990–1991	Cheers	Waiter, Paul	2 episodes (credited as Dietrich Bader)
1990	21 Jump Street	Paul Edward Novack	Episode: "Last Chance High"
1990	Quantum Leap	Dillon	Episode: "Rebel Without a Clue" (credited as Dietrich Bader)
1991	The Fresh Prince of Bel-Air	Frank Schaeffer	2 episodes (credited as Dietrich Bader)
1993	Danger Theatre	The Searcher	7 episodes
1995	Diagnosis Murder	Lincoln Cutter	Episode: "The New Healers"
1995	Frasier	Brad	Episode: "The Innkeepers"
1995–2004	The Drew Carey Show	Oswald Lee Harvey	233 episodes
2004–2005	Center of the Universe	Tommy Barnett	12 episodes
2007	7th Heaven	Theodore Alan "Al" Bonaducci	Episode: "Nothing Says Lovin' Like Something from the Oven"
2007	Monk	Chance Singer	Episode: "Mr. Monk and the Naked Man"
2007	Curb Your Enthusiasm	Simon	Episode: "The TiVo Guy"
2008	Reno 911!	Tommy Hawk	Episode: "Bounty Hunter Tommy Hawk"
2008	CSI: Crime Scene Investigation	Bud Parker	Episode: "Two and a Half Deaths"
2009	Drop Dead Diva	Wallace Haft	Episode: "The Chinese Wall"
2009	CSI: Miami	Myles Martini	Episode: "Dead on Arrival"
2009–2010	Bones	Andrew Hacker	3 episodes
2010	Medium	Fred Rovick	Episode: "Will the Real Fred Rovick Please Stand Up?"
2010	Chuck	Del	Episode: "Chuck Versus the Beard"
2010–2011	Outsourced	Charlie Davies	22 episodes
2011	Psych	Eli	Episode: "The Tao of Gus"
2012	NTSF:SD:SUV	Riddle Terrorist	Episode: "Sabbath-tage"
2012–2013	The Exes	Paul	4 episodes
2013	Save Me	Elliot Tompkins	7 episodes
2013	Arrested Development	Gunner	Episode: "Modern Marvels"
2013	Baby Daddy	Winston Douglas	Episode: "Never Ben in Love"
2013	Raising Hope	Gary	Episode: "Murder, She Hoped"
2014	Two and a Half Men	Dirk	Episode: "Dial 1-900-Mix-A-Lot"
2014–2019	Veep	Bill Ericsson	21 episodes
2015	The Goldbergs	Lou	Episode: "The Lost Boy"
2016–2021	American Housewife	Greg Otto	103 episodes
2016–2022	Better Things	Rich	12 episodes
2017	Bill Nye Saves the World	Smallpox	Episode: "Do Some Shots, Save the World"
2017	Playing House	Simon	Episode: "Reverse the Curse"
2019	Young Sheldon	Batman	Episode: "Teenager Soup and a Little Ball of Fib"
2020	Space Force	General Rongley	3 episodes
2021	Scooby-Doo, Where Are You Now!	Batman	Special
2023	Lucky Hank	Tony Conigula	Main cast
2025	Running Point	Assistant Coach Tony Spagnoli	Episode: "The Streak"
2026	High Potential	Brad Latmore	Episode: "Turn, Up the Heat"

==== Web ====
Year	Title	Role	Notes
2017	Kevin Pollak's Chat Show	Himself	Episode: "324"

=== Voice roles ===
==== Film ====
Year	Title	Role	Notes
1999	Bartok the Magnificent	Vol	Direct-to-video
2000	Buzz Lightyear of Star Command: The Adventure Begins	Warp Darkmatter, Agent Z	Direct-to-video
2001	Recess: School's Out	Guard #2	
2002	Ice Age	Oscar	
2002	The Country Bears	Ted Bedderhead	
2005	Dinotopia: Quest for the Ruby Sunstone	John	Direct-to-video
2006	Holly Hobbie and Friends: Surprise Party	Uncle Dave Beech	Video short
2006	Asterix and the Vikings	Olaf, Unhygienix	Original version
2006	Holly Hobbie and Friends: Christmas Wishes	Uncle Dave Beech	Video short
2007	Surf's Up	Tank "The Shredder" Evans	
2007	Holly Hobbie and Friends: Best Friends Forever	Uncle Dave Beech	Video short
2008	Open Season 2	Rufus	
2008	Underfist: Halloween Bash	Hoss Delgado	Television film
2008	Bolt	Veteran Cat	
2010	The Search for Santa Paws	Comet	Direct-to-video
2011	Spooky Buddies	Hound	Direct-to-video
2012	Santa Paws 2: The Santa Pups	Comet	Direct-to-video
2013	Scooby-Doo! Mask of the Blue Falcon	Brad Adams / Blue Falcon II	Direct-to-video
2013	Superman: Unbound	Steve Lombard	Direct-to-video
2014	JLA Adventures: Trapped in Time	Bruce Wayne / Batman	Direct-to-video
2014	Scooby-Doo! Frankencreepy	Mrs. Vanders	Direct-to-video
2015	Lego DC Comics Super Heroes: Justice League vs. Bizarro League	Guy Gardner / Green Lantern, Gardner Grant / Greenzarro	Direct-to-video
2015	Scooby-Doo! Moon Monster Madness	H.A.M.	Direct-to-video
2016	Pup Star	Kano	Direct-to-video
2017	Surf's Up 2: WaveMania	Tank "The Shredder" Evans	Direct-to-video
2017	Tangled: Before Ever After	Stan the Guard	Television film
2017	Pup Star: Better2Getter	Kano	Direct-to-video
2018	Scooby-Doo! & Batman: The Brave and the Bold	Bruce Wayne / Batman	Direct-to-video
2018	Duck Duck Goose	Bing	
2018	Puppy Star Christmas	Kano	Direct-to-video
2020	Superman: Red Son	Lex Luthor	Direct-to-video
2020	Phineas and Ferb the Movie: Candace Against the Universe	Borthos	

==== Television ====
Year	Title	Role	Notes
1996	Gargoyles	Jason Canmore	3 episodes
1998–1999	Hercules	Adonis	Recurring role; 28 episodes
1999	Olive, the Other Reindeer	Zookeeper	Holiday special
1999–2000	Pepper Ann	Additional voices	3 episodes
1999–2009; 2026-present	King of the Hill	Doctor, Dirk, Jody "Ray-Roy" Strickland, Eli Selwick	4 episodes
2000	The Simpsons	Sheriff	Episode: "Kill the Alligator and Run"
2000–2002	Baby Blues	Kenny, additional voices	Main role
2000–2001	Buzz Lightyear of Star Command	Warp Darkmatter, Targo, Doorman, Natron, Zurg Spy	Recurring role; 8 episodes
2001–2002	The Zeta Project	Zeta, Infiltration Unit 7	Main role
2001	Batman Beyond	Zeta	Episode: "Countdown"
2001	The Legend of Tarzan	Stanley Obrowski	Episode: "Tarzan and the Silver Screen"
2001–2003	Lloyd in Space	Harvulian 'Boomer' Standervault	Recurring role; 10 episodes
2002	Teamo Supremo	Dehydro	3 episodes
2002	Grim & Evil	Hoss Delgado	2 episodes
2002–2007	The Grim Adventures of Billy & Mandy	Hoss Delgado, additional voices	Recurring role
2004	Dave the Barbarian	Master of Evolution, Ox	Episode: "Beef!/Rite of Pillage"
2005	Kim Possible Movie: So the Drama	Lars	Television film
2005	South Park	Bat Dad, Tom Nelson	Episode: "The Losing Edge"
2005; 2007	Higglytown Heroes	Crane Operator Hero	2 episodes
2006	Korgoth of Barbaria	Korgoth, Henchman #1	Television short
2006–2008	The Batman	Number One, Captain Slash, Shadow Thief	3 episodes
2007–2009	Chowder	Sergeant Hoagie, Officer Snow Leopard, Mr. Sambl, Fruit Tailor	3 episodes
2008–2014; 2025–present	Phineas and Ferb	Vance Ward, Albert DuBois, Tom Totally, Additional voices	Recurring role; 7 episodes
2008–2010	The Secret Saturdays	Fiskerton, Dr. Henry Ceveyo, Maboul, Cody	Main role; 33 episodes
2008–2011	Batman: The Brave and the Bold	Batman, Kilowog, Ace, Owlman, Solomon Grundy, Matches Malone, Lord Death Man	Main role
2009–2012	The Penguins of Madagascar	Rat King	Recurring role; 9 episodes
2009	The Goode Family	Jeff, Lane	Episode: "After-School Special"
2010	Ben 10: Alien Force	Simian, Lu	Episode: "Birds of a Feather"
2010–2011	Mad	Announcer, Parker Selfridge, Batman, Hannibal, Iron Man	4 episodes
2011	Ben 10: Ultimate Alien	Simian	Episode: "Simian Says"
2011–2014; 2016	Kung Fu Panda: Legends of Awesomeness	Hundun, Pig Waiter, Villager #1	Recurring role; 8 episodes
2012	Napoleon Dynamite	Rex, Shasta, Male Judge	Main role
2012	The Looney Tunes Show	Barry	Episode: "The Shelf"
2012–2013	Pound Puppies	Banjo Player, Worker	2 episodes
2012–2013	Green Lantern: The Animated Series	Guy Gardner	3 episodes
2012; 2014	Gravity Falls	Dundgren	2 episodes
2013	Chosen	Daniel Easton	3 episodes
2013	Farm League	Batmongoose	
2013	Fish Hooks	Mr. McGroucherson	Episode: "Milo vs. Milo"
2013–2017	Ultimate Spider-Man	Kraven the Hunter, Moon Knight	Recurring role; 11 episodes
2013–2014	Monsters vs. Aliens	The Missing Link, additional voices	Main role; 25 episodes
2013–2015	Turbo Fast	Hardcase, additional voices	Recurring role; 6 episodes
2014	Teenage Mutant Ninja Turtles	Bigfoot, Announcer	Episode: "A Foot Too Big"
2014	Ben 10: Omniverse	Simian, Alien Citizen	2 episodes
2014–2016	All Hail King Julien	Abner, Andy Fairfax, Trevor	Recurring role; 17 episodes
2014–2016	TripTank	Dad, Cave Troll, Evil Tree, The Great Donkey	4 episodes
2015	Transformers: Rescue Bots	Jules Verne	Episode: "The Last of Morocco"
2015	Be Cool, Scooby-Doo	Scott McDoon, Waiter, Chef	Episode: "All Paws on Deck"
2015	Nickelodeon's Ho Ho Holiday Special	Villain	Holiday special
2015–2018	Miles from Tomorrowland	Admiral Crick, Sly, Dashiell Scamp, Mr. Cooney, additional voices	Recurring role; 46 episodes
2016–2020	BoJack Horseman	Judah Mannowdog, Blimp Pilot	Recurring role; 14 episodes
2016–2019	Milo Murphy's Law	Martin Murphy, additional voices	Recurring role
2016	We Bare Bears	Todd Eagle, additional voices	Episode: "Baby Bears on a Plane"
2016	Guardians of the Galaxy	Maximus	2 episodes
2016–2017	Justice League Action	Booster Gold, Uthool, H.I.V.E. Master	Recurring role; 11 episodes
2017–2019	American Dad!	Juan 'Johnny Concussion' Consuelo, Demon Guy Fieri	3 episodes
2017–2019	Wacky Races	Peter Perfect, additional voices	
2017	OK K.O.! Let's Be Heroes	Cupid	Episode: "Second First Date"
2017	Michael Jackson's Halloween	Franklin Stein	TV special
2017	Pig Goat Banana Cricket	Tony Towel	2 episodes
2017–2020	Rapunzel's Tangled Adventure	Stan the Guard	18 episodes
2017–2022	Pete the Cat	Callie's Dad	15 episodes
2018–2020	The Boss Baby: Back in Business	Junior Fancy	
2018	Big Hero 6: The Series	Bluff Dunder, Felony Carl, additional voices	Recurring role
2019–present	Harley Quinn	Batman, Thomas Wayne, Gorilla Grodd, additional voices	Recurring role
2019	Amphibia	Frog Jordan	Episode: "The Big Bugball Game"
2020	New Looney Tunes	Reginald St. Archibald	Episode: "The Silly Six"
2020	Animaniacs	Odysseus	Episode: "Warners Unbound"
2021	The Loud House Digital Shorts	Muscle Fish	Shorts: "Muscle Fish" and "Super Switchreoo-niverse"
2021; 2024	Masters of the Universe: Revelation	King Randor, Trap Jaw, Buzz Off, additional voices	Recurring role; 6 episodes
2022	Transformers: EarthSpark	Mandroid	Recurring role
2022	The Boss Baby: Back in the Crib	Junior Fancy Jr.	
2023–2025	Hamster & Gretel	The Imposter, additional voices	Recurring role
2024–2026	Rock, Paper, Scissors	Chad Brockchad	Recurring role
2024–present	Krapopolis	Sludge Monster/Frankensludge, Various	3 episodes
2024	Batman: Caped Crusader	Harvey Dent / Two-Face	8 episodes
2025	Creature Commandos	Nanaue / King Shark	Episode: "A Very Funny Monster"
2025	Bat-Fam	Killer Moth	

==== Video games ====
Year	Title	Role	Notes
2006	The Grim Adventures of Billy & Mandy	Hoss Delgado	
2007	Surf's Up	Tank "The Shredder" Evans	
2009	Cartoon Network Universe: FusionFall	Hoss Delgado, Fiskerton	
2009	The Secret Saturdays: Beasts of the 5th Sun	Fiskerton	
2010	Batman: The Brave and the Bold – The Videogame	Batman, Kilowog	
2015	Skylanders: SuperChargers	Spitfire	
2019	Marvel Ultimate Alliance 3: The Black Order	Maximus	
2023	Justice League: Cosmic Chaos	Batman, Super Fan Steve, Ethyl	
