= Atlantic City High School =

High school in Atlantic County, New Jersey, US

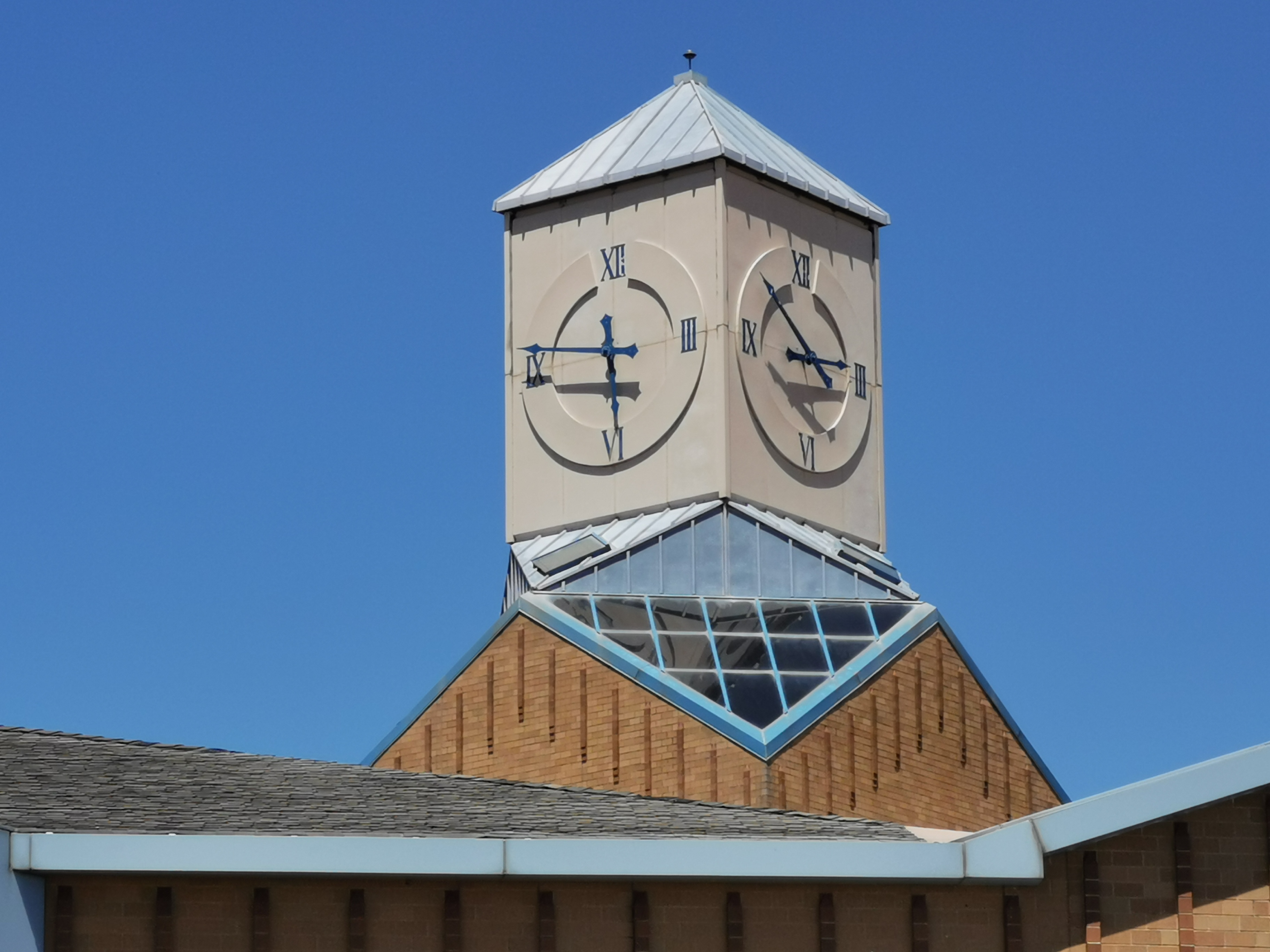
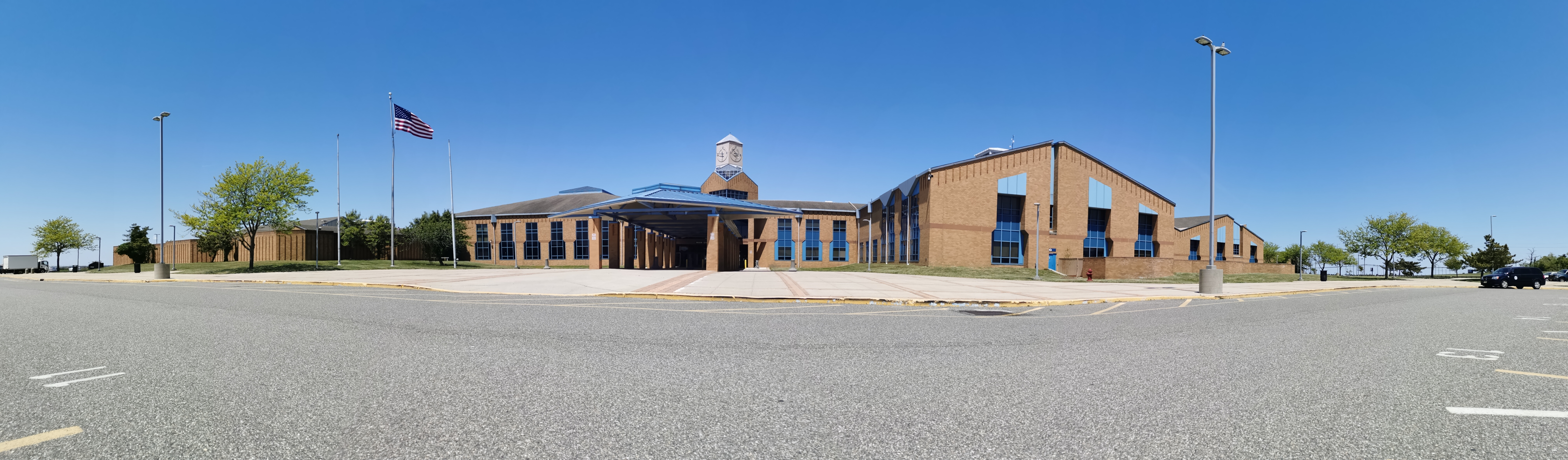
- Clocktower and building

Location
- 1400 North Albany Avenue; Atlantic City, Atlantic County, New Jersey 08401; United States; 39.36772°N 74.47709°W

Information
- Other name: ACHS
- Type: Public high school
- Established: 1895
- School district: Atlantic City School District
- NCES School ID: 340096000010
- Principal: Constance Days-Chapman
- Faculty: 149.8 FTEs
- Grades: 9–12
- Enrollment: 1,731 (as of 2024–25)
- Student to teacher ratio: 11.6:1
- Colors: Navy blue and white
- Athletics conference: Cape-Atlantic League
- Nickname: Vikings
- Website: achs.acboe.org

Atlantic City High School (ACHS) is a comprehensive public high school in Atlantic City, in Atlantic County, in the U.S. state of New Jersey. It is the lone upper secondary school of the Atlantic City School District.

The current school building opened in 1994 and holds approximately 2,500 students. The school serves students from Atlantic City, along with those from Brigantine, Longport, Margate City and Ventnor City, who attend the school as part of sending/receiving relationships with their respective school districts.

As of the 2024–25 school year, the school had an enrollment of 1,731 students and 149.8 classroom teachers (on an FTE basis), for a student–teacher ratio of 11.6:1. There were 1,342 students (77.5% of enrollment) eligible for free lunch and 94 (5.4% of students) eligible for reduced-cost lunch.

== History ==
Atlantic City's first high school building was constructed in 1895 at Illinois and Arctic Avenues, on a small site that limited room for growth. In 1901, the high school relocated to a building at Ohio and Pacific Avenues. After the high school relocated a third time, the former building was reused as Central Junior High School for many years. The third building, located at Albany and Atlantic Avenues, opened on September 17, 1923. Constructed at a cost of over $1.75 million (equivalent to $33.1 million in 2025), it included a 1,000-seat auditorium and a 6,000-pipe organ.

Atlantic Cape Community College, the second community college to be established in New Jersey, opened in 1966 in space leased from the high school and moved to its campus in Mays Landing in February 1968.

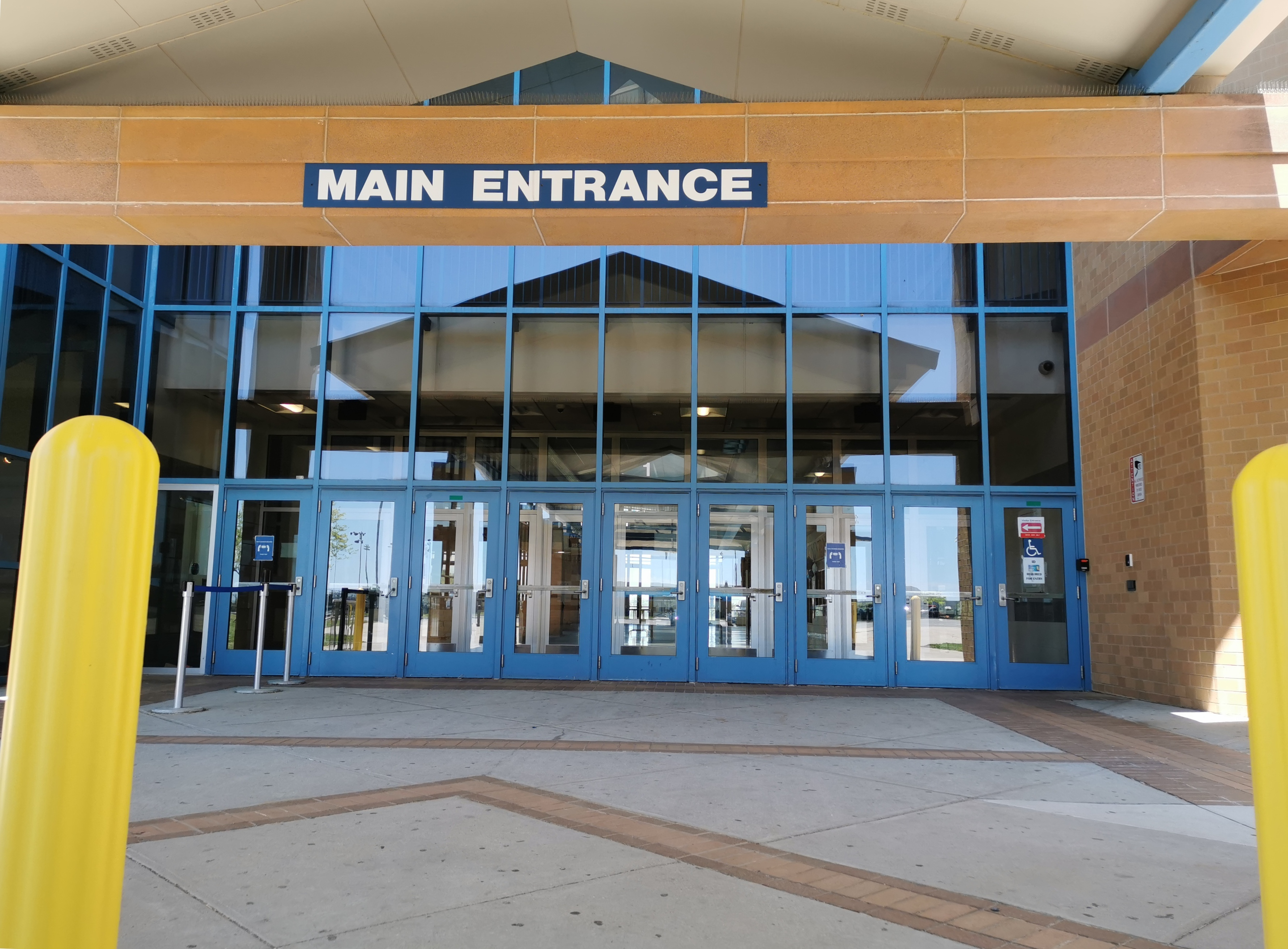
The current high school's entrance

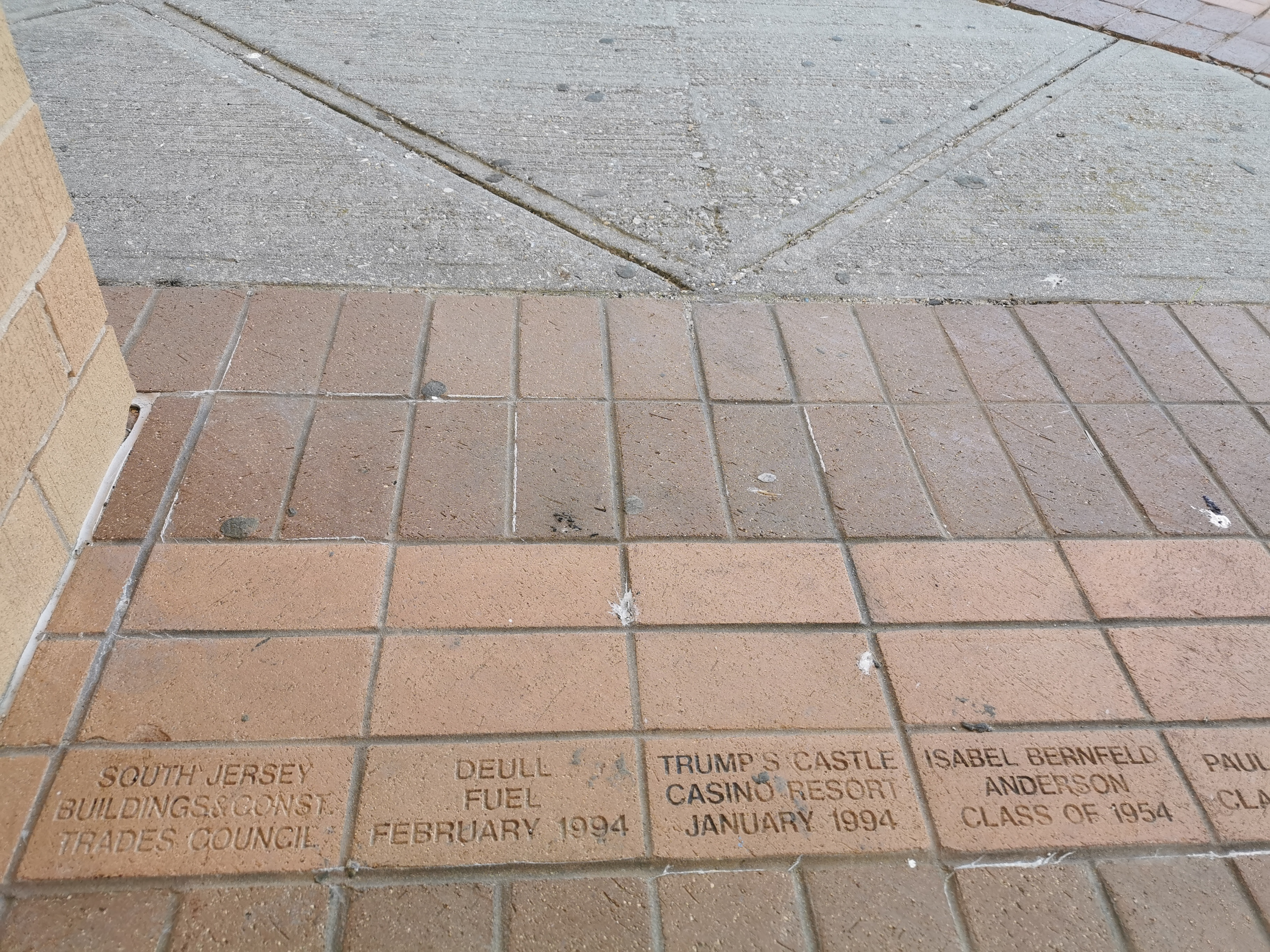
A set of donor plaques along the main entrance of the new high school, including one donated by Donald Trump

The fourth, and current Atlantic City High School was constructed on "Great Island," opening to students in November 1994, at a cost of $83 million and had its formal dedication ceremony later that month before a gathered crowd of 4,000. The building was designed by Blumberg Associates Architecture.

== Awards, recognition and rankings ==
The school was the 262nd-ranked public high school in New Jersey out of 339 schools statewide in New Jersey Monthly magazine's September 2014 cover story on the state's "Top Public High Schools", using a new ranking methodology. The school had been ranked 214th in the state of 328 schools in 2012, after being ranked 247th in 2010 out of 322 schools listed. The magazine ranked the school 255th in 2008 out of 316 schools. The school was ranked 270 in the magazine's September 2006 issue, which surveyed 316 schools across the state. Schooldigger.com ranked the school 334th out of 376 public high schools statewide in its 2010 rankings (a decrease of 9 positions from the 2009 rank) which were based on the combined percentage of students classified as proficient or above proficient on the language arts literacy and mathematics components of the High School Proficiency Assessment (HSPA).

== Athletics ==
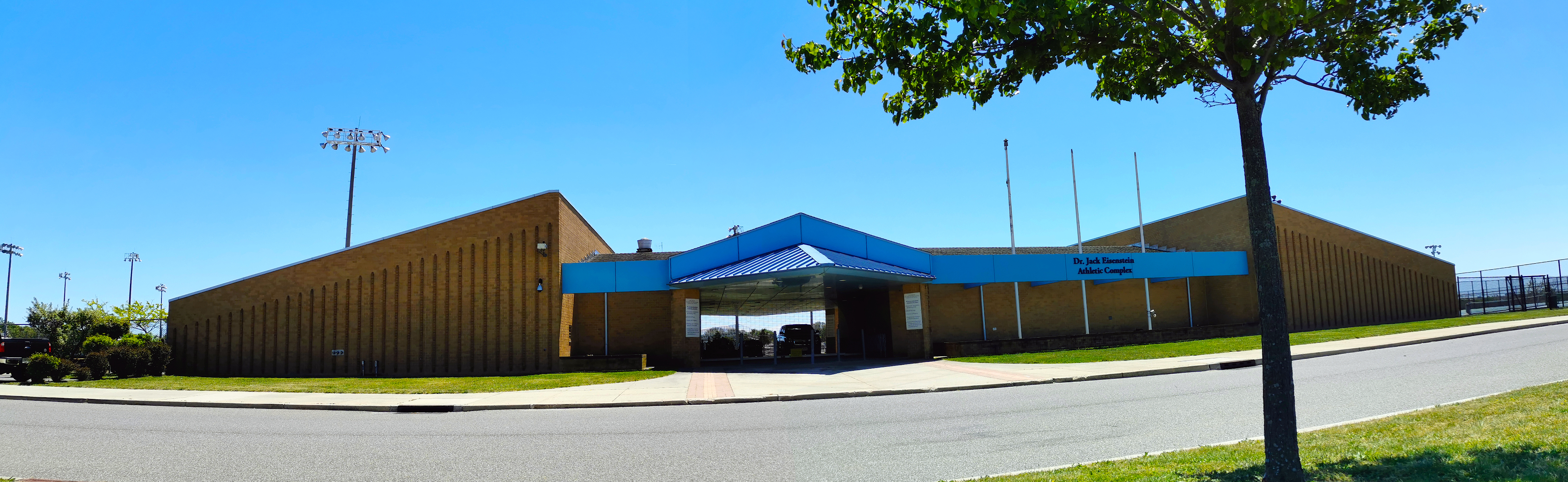
Dr. Jack Eisenstein Athletic Complex

The Atlantic City High School Vikings compete in the Atlantic Division of the Cape-Atlantic League, an athletic conference comprised of public and private high schools in Atlantic, Cape May, Cumberland and Gloucester counties, operating under the aegis of the New Jersey State Interscholastic Athletic Association. With 1,398 students in grades 10-12, the school was classified by the NJSIAA for the 2022–24 school years as Group IV South for most athletic competition purposes. The football team competes in the United Division of the 94-team West Jersey Football League superconference and was classified by the NJSIAA as Group V South for football for 2022–2024, which included schools with 1,333 to 2,324 students.

The boys swimming team won the state non-public championship from 1921 to 1929. In 1924, the team won the state swimming championship for a fourth time, setting three meet records in the process, with the Lawrenceville School coming in second and The Peddie School in third. The next year, at a meet held in Philadelphia, the swim team won the national interscholastic championship, breaking the streak of four championships won by Mercersburg Academy. In March 1925, the Atlantic City swim team were the guests of President Calvin Coolidge at the White House, in recognition of their championship.

The girls' basketball team won the Group IV state championships in 1981 vs. Eastside Paterson and repeated in 1982 vs. Plainfield High School. The 1981 team finished the season with a record of 29–1 after winning the Group IV state title with a 45–43 victory in the finals against an Eastside team that came into the game undefeated.

The 1994 Boys Varsity 8 Crew had an undefeated season and took the Triple Crown, winning the Philadelphia City Championships, Stotesbury Cup Regatta and National Rowing Championships. The V8 went on to place second in the Princess Elizabeth Cup at the Henley Royal Regatta on the Thames River in England.

The 1999 football team won the South Jersey Group IV state championship at Rutgers Stadium with a 31–29 win over Eastern High School, a victory that marked the program's first sectional title.

The boys' basketball team won the NJSIAA Group IV state championship in 2012 (defeating Ridgewood High School in the tournament final), 2012 (vs. Elizabeth High School) and 2013 (vs. Linden High School). The team won the Group IV tournament in 2005, defeating Trenton Central High School 71–70 in the semifinals, and Ridgewood High School by a score of 56–42 in the championship game at Rutgers University. In 2012, the Viking's boys' basketball team won the South Jersey Group IV title and the Group IV state championship with a 53–47 win against Elizabeth High School, marking the team's second state title. The Vikings repeated as Group IV state champions in basketball in 2013, defeating Linden High School in overtime by a score of 60–54 to become back-to-back champions.

In 2007, Todd Busler was one of 50 recipients of the Maxwell Football Club's Tri-State High School Award given to players from schools located in South Jersey, the five-county Philadelphia area and the Lehigh Valley of Pennsylvania.

The boys' soccer team was 2008 inaugural Brigantine Cup champions.

In 2009, the girls' tennis team won the South Jersey Group IV title beating Millville High School 3–2, the program's first group title.

In 2010, the girls' swim team won the CAL American Conference title and defeated Vineland High School to win the South Jersey Public A championship for the first time in the program's history, going 14–0 before falling to West Windsor-Plainsboro High School South in the state semifinals.

The school's gymnasium was home to the United States Basketball League (USBL) Atlantic City Seagulls from 1996 to 2001. The Seagulls won the USBL Championship in 1997, 1998 and 1999.

== Administration ==
The principal of Atlantic City High School is Constance Days-Chapman. Her administration consists of four vice principals.

== Rules ==
=== Dress code ===
Beginning in 2007, in the hopes of preventing gang identification, Atlantic City High School required students wear a uniform, putting it in a minority of public schools to do so in the United States. Other high schools in South Jersey, such as Middle Township High School, Vineland High School, and Bridgeton High School, followed suit. The change was controversial, with some parents saying in 2009 that enforcement of the dress code had become a "distraction from education," after the school suspended as many as 150 students in a single day at the start of the school year for violating the uniform rules. For example, in the 2013–2014 school year, it was required that students wear collared shirts in only the two school colors plus black, with no logos except ACHS's own logo (or that of one of its sports teams).

In August 2019, the Board of Education dropped its uniform policy for the 2019–2020 school year, opting instead for a dress code. ACHS students are still restricted from a few garment types, such as bare midriffs, ripped jeans, leggings, and "do rags", or garments the school deems to have "obscene" words or images on them.

=== Truancy ===
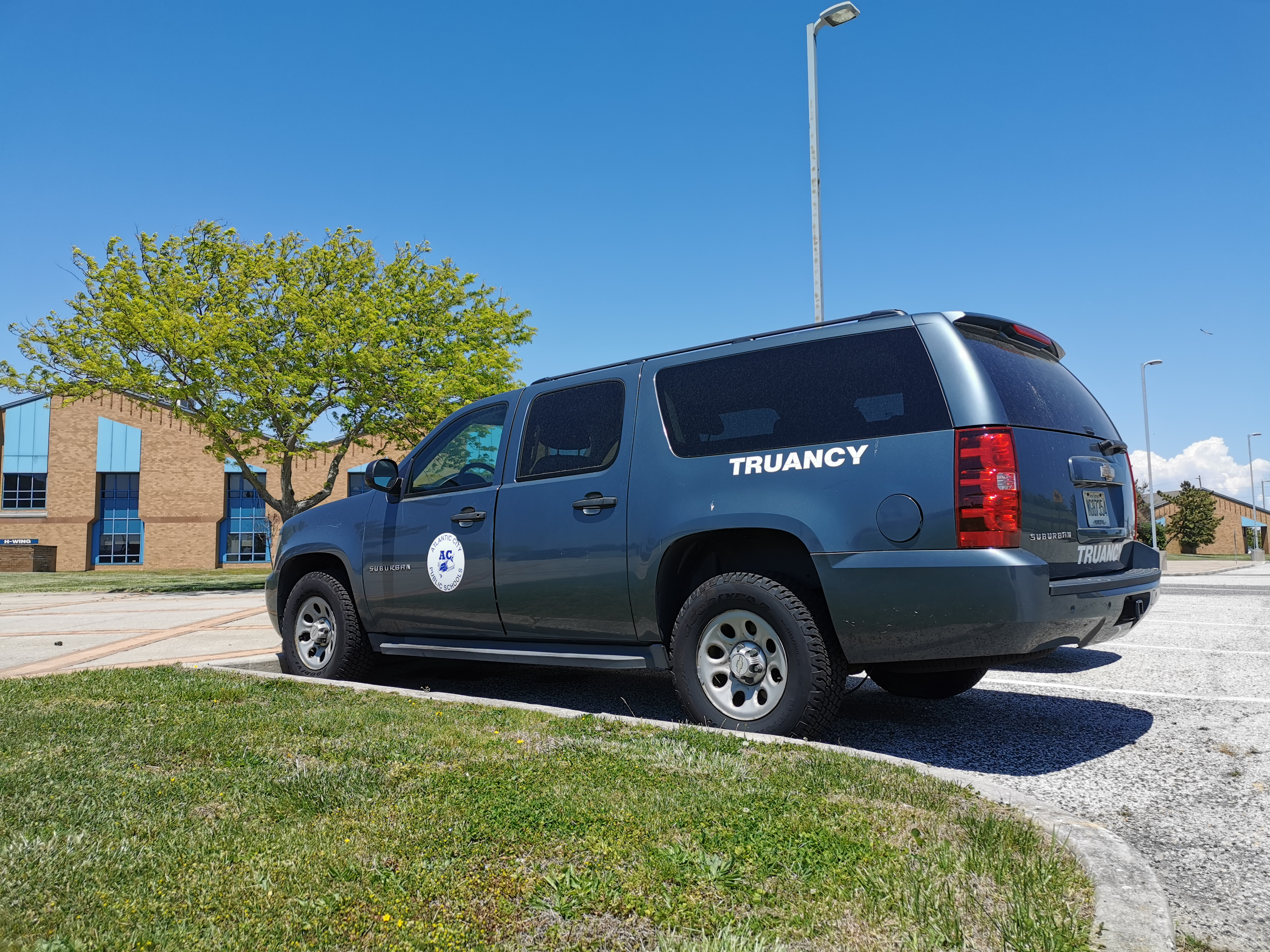
A truancy enforcement vehicle (10^{th} generation Chevrolet Suburban) capable of returning students to school owned by Atlantic City High School

Chronic absenteeism, or truancy, is a problem for ACHS; in 2015, 21% of its students were deemed chronically absent. The school has established a Truancy Task Force to enforce state laws requiring school attendance.

== Academics ==
Atlantic City High School offers many Advanced Placement (AP) courses, in addition to the standard college-prep and Honors classes. ACHS offers 20 AP courses: AP Biology; AP Calculus AB; AP Calculus BC; AP Chemistry; AP Studio Art; AP Microeconomics; AP Macroeconomics; AP English Language and Composition; AP English Literature and Composition; AP Environmental Science; AP French Language and Culture; AP United States Government and Politics; AP Latin; AP Music Theory; AP Physics 1; AP Physics C; AP Psychology; AP Spanish Language and Culture; AP Statistics; and AP United States History.

== Notable alumni ==
- Martin Agronsky (1915–1999, class of 1932), journalist
- Valerie H. Armstrong (class of 1964), retired judge of the New Jersey Superior Court
- James Avery (1945–2013), television actor
- Ellen Bass (born 1947), poet and author
- Barry Beckham (born 1944), playwright and novelist
- Brad (born 1963) and Eric Blumberg (born 1966), real estate entrepreneurs and developers of mobile GPS real estate information technology
- Bugs Bower (1922–2020), composer, music arranger, bandleader and record producer
- Fredrick Brennan (born 1994, class of 2012), software developer and type designer who founded the imageboard website 8chan
- David Brog (born 1965/1966), former executive director of Christians United for Israel
- Bob Brooks, basketball player
- Carole Byard (1941–2017), visual artist and illustrator of children's books, who was the recipient of a Caldecott Medal and multiple Coretta Scott King Awards
- Rosalind Cash (1938–1995), actress whose career endured on stage, screen, and television, despite her staunch refusal to portray stereotyped "black" roles
- Tim Cavanaugh, journalist and screenwriter who is a news editor at The Washington Examiner
- Joe Cicero (1910–1983), professional baseball player with the Boston Red Sox and the Philadelphia Athletics
- Wayne Colman (born 1946), linebacker who played for the Philadelphia Eagles and New Orleans Saints
- Sidney Drell (1926–2016), theoretical physicist and arms control expert
- Frank S. Farley (1901–1977), New Jersey State Senator who was described by The New York Times in 1977 as "probably the most powerful legislator in New Jersey history"
- Vera King Farris (1938–2009, class of 1954), president of Richard Stockton College of New Jersey from 1983 to 2003
- Andrew Fields (born 1957, class of 1975), collegiate basketball coach and a retired professional basketball player
- Milton W. Glenn (1903–1967), politician who represented New Jersey's 2nd congressional district in the United States House of Representatives from 1957 to 1965
- Myron Goldfinger (1933–2023, class of 1950), architect best known for designing large angular abstract houses in New York and New Jersey
- Brian Heffron (born 1973, class of 1993), professional wrestler for World Wrestling Entertainment and Extreme Championship Wrestling
- Zulfi Hoxha (born 1992, class of 2010), jihadi, ISIS fighter
- Pete Hunter (born 1980), cornerback for the NFL's Seattle Seahawks who was a fifth-round pick in 2002
- Ed Hurst (1926–2020), radio and television personality
- Enoch L. "Nucky" Johnson (1883–1968, class of 1900), Atlantic City mobster and political boss
- Marvin Josephson (1927–2022), talent agent and executive, who was the founder of ICM Partners
- Brett Kennedy (born 1994, class of 2012), pitcher for the San Diego Padres of Major League Baseball
- Pinky Kravitz (1927–2015), radio broadcaster and print journalist
- Lorenzo Langford (born 1955), Mayor of Atlantic City 2008–2014
- JoAnna LaSane (1935–2019, class of 1953), model, dancer and arts administrator
- Joseph Lazarow (1923–2008), Mayor of Atlantic City from 1976 to 1982
- George Kin Leung (1899–1977, class of 1918), Chinese-American translator of Chinese literature
- Bob Levy (born 1947), Mayor of Atlantic City from 2006–2007
- Barry Lubin (born 1952), creator of the clown character "Grandma" of the Big Apple Circus
- Harvey Mason (born 1947), musician-drummer
- Michael J. Matthews (1934–2014), politician who represented the 2nd Legislative District in the New Jersey General Assembly from 1978 to 1984 and was Mayor of Atlantic City from 1982 to 1984
- James J. McCullough (born 1942, class of 1960), politician who served in the New Jersey Senate from 2007 to 2008, where he represented the 2nd Legislative District
- Sean Morey (born 1953), stand-up comedian and singer
- Scott Neustadter (born 1977), screenwriter
- Arnold Newman (1918–2006), photographer, noted for his "environmental portraits" of artists and politicians
- Joshua Ozersky (1967–2015), food writer and historian
- Joseph B. Perskie (1885–1957; class of 1904), Associate Justice of the New Jersey Supreme Court from 1933 to 1947
- Steven P. Perskie (born 1945), judge and politician
- George Lincoln Rockwell (1918–1967), founder of the American Nazi Party
- Lou Roe (born 1972), small forward for the NCAA's University of Massachusetts Minutemen and the NBA's Detroit Pistons and Golden State Warriors. A second-round pick in 1995
- Jessica Savitch (1947–1983), television journalist, who was killed in a car accident
- Herbert Schlosser (1926–2021), television executive who was president of NBC from 1974 until 1978
- Steve Smoger (1950–2022), boxing referee who oversaw more than 200 title bouts
- Paul Steelman (born 1955), architect
- Claire Swift (born 1974, class of 1992), politician who represented the 2nd Legislative District in the New Jersey General Assembly from 2022 to 2026
- Tank Toland, (born 1980), professional wrestler, three time OVW Tag Team Champion, wrestler for Ring of Honor.
- Frank Turner (born 1988, class of 2006), professional basketball player for Crailsheim Merlins of the ProA
- James L. Usry (1922–2002), first African-American mayor of Atlantic City
- Earl Wilson (born 1958), defensive end who played in the NFL and CFL
- Norman Joseph Woodland (1921–2012, class of 1943), inventor of the bar code
- Howard Emery Wright (1908–1988), African-American social psychologist and educator who served as president of Allen University
- Wu Chaoshu (1887–1934), Foreign Minister of the Republic of China in 1927–1928 and Minister to the United States from 1928 to 1931

== See also ==
- Bader Field (ballpark)
