= William B. Bader =

Former U.S. Assistant Secretary of State

9th Assistant Secretary of State for Educational and Cultural Affairs
- In office November 18, 1999 – January 20, 2001
- President: Bill Clinton
- Preceded by: Alice Stone Ilchman
- Succeeded by: Patricia Harrison

Personal details
- Born: William Banks Bader; September 8, 1931 Atlantic City, New Jersey, U.S.
- Died: March 16, 2016 (aged 84)
- Spouse: Gretta Bader
- Children: 4, including Diedrich
- Relatives: Edward L. Bader (grandfather)
- Education: Pomona College (BA); Princeton University (MA, PhD)

Military service
- Allegiance: United States
- Branch/service: United States Navy/Reserves
- Years of service: 1955–1958
- Rank: Captain

William Banks Bader (September 8, 1931 – March 16, 2016) was an American diplomat who served as the assistant secretary of state for educational and cultural affairs from 1999 to 2001.

== Early life and education ==
Bader's paternal grandfather was Edward L. Bader, who was mayor of Atlantic City, New Jersey and is of German and Scottish heritage. He was educated at Pomona College, receiving a Bachelor of Arts in 1953. He then studied as a Fulbright scholar at LMU Munich and the University of Vienna.

He served in the United States Navy from 1955 to 1958 on active duty and later transferred to the Reserves before retiring with the rank of captain. He then studied German history at Princeton University under Gordon A. Craig, earning a Master of Arts in 1960 and a PhD in 1964.

== Career ==
Bader joined the United States Foreign Service in 1965, and was posted to the Bureau of Political-Military Affairs in Washington, D.C. In 1966, Sen. J. William Fulbright (D-AR) invited Bader to join the staff of the United States Senate Committee on Foreign Relations where he was a senior staff member overseeing international security and arms control from 1966 to 1969. During this time, he also worked for the United States Senate Foreign Relations Subcommittee on Near Eastern and South and Central Asian Affairs, chaired by Sen. Stuart Symington (D-MO).

In the early 1970s, Bader worked for the Ford Foundation in Paris. He became a fellow of the Woodrow Wilson International Center for Scholars in 1974.

Bader returned to government in 1976 when he was appointed deputy under secretary of defense for policy. He returned to the staff of the United States Senate Committee on Foreign Relations in 1979 as Staff Director at a time when the committee was considering the Camp David Accords, the Taiwan Relations Act, and SALT II.

In 1981, Bader became Vice President and Senior Officer of the Washington, D.C. office of SRI International. He moved to California in 1988 to become Vice President of SRI International's policy division. He became president of the Eurasia Foundation in 1992. He spent 1996–97 as a visiting fellow at the World Bank Group.

In 1999, President of the United States Bill Clinton nominated Bader to be assistant secretary of state for educational and cultural affairs and, after Senate confirmation, Bader held the office from November 18, 1999, until January 20, 2001. In 2025 his son Diedrich Bader said that though his father and then-Vice President Dick Cheney had been friendly since the Ford administration, in which Cheney had served as Chief of Staff, Cheney personally saw to the elder Bader's termination from the State Department after Bader had written an op-ed comparing the run-up to the Iraq War to the Gulf of Tonkin incident.

== Personal life ==
During his time in Munich, Bader married his Pomona College classmate, sculptor Gretta Lange; they had four children, the youngest is actor Diedrich Bader, the three elder children are academics working respectively in the fields of linguistics, political science, and medieval history.

== Selected publications ==
- "Oesterreich in Potsdam" in Oesterreichische Zeitschrift für Aussenpolitik, Vol. II, No. 4, June 1962
- "The United States and the 'German Problem'" in Foreign Affairs, 1965
- Austria Between East and West: 1945–1955, Stanford University Press, 1966
- The United States and the Spread of Nuclear Weapons, Pegasus, 1968
- "The Congress and National Security" in Naval War College Review, 1970
- "The Proliferation of Conventional Weapons" in The Future of the International Legal Order, Vol. III, ed. C.E. Black and Richard Falk, 1971
- "Congress and the Making of the U.S. Security Policies," Adelphi Paper No. 173, IISS, London, England, 1982
- "Austria, The United States, and the Path to Neutrality" in The Austrian Solution, ed. Robert A. Bauer, 1982
- "Western Europe" in TRANSACTION/SOCIETY, Vol. 22, No. 4, May/June 1985
- "Western Europe: From Roosevelt to Reagan" in The President, the Congress and Foreign Policy: A Joint Policy Project of the Association of Former Members of Congress and the Atlantic Council of the United States, Lanham, New York; London, England; University Press of New York, 1986
- The Taiwan Relations Act: A Decade of Implementation, Hudson Institute, Indianapolis, Indiana, ed. William Bader and Jeffrey Bergner, 1989

== See also ==
- Diedrich Bader
- Edward L. Bader

Government offices
Preceded by Alice Stone Ilchman; Office abolished 1978–1999	Assistant Secretary of State for Educational and Cultural Affairs; November 18, 1999 – January 20, 2001	Succeeded by Patricia Harrison
