= LaSane =

LaSane is a surname. Notable people with the surname include:

- Bruce LaSane (born 1967), American football player
- Harry LaSane (1924–1984), American boxer
- JoAnna LaSane (1935–2019), American model and arts administrator
