= 2025 New Jersey elections =

- November 4, 2025

A general election was held in the U.S. state of New Jersey on November 4, 2025. Primary elections were held on June 10. All elected offices at the state level are on the ballot in this election cycle, including Governor and Lieutenant Governor for four-year terms, and all 80 seats in the New Jersey General Assembly for two-year terms. In addition to the gubernatorial and State Legislative elections, numerous county offices and County Commissioners, in addition to municipal offices, were up for election.

== Governor ==
Democratic congresswoman Mikie Sherrill defeated Republican former state assemblyman Jack Ciattarelli. Incumbent Democratic governor Phil Murphy was term-limited.

== General Assembly ==
New Jersey voters elected two Assembly members in all of the state's legislative districts for a two-year term to the New Jersey General Assembly. The election resulted in Democrats gaining five seats, and winning the largest majority in 52 years, with 57 seats in total.

== Local elections ==
Various county and municipal elections were held simultaneously, including elections for mayor in Atlantic City, Hoboken, and Jersey City.
