= William Thomas Somers =

American politician

William Thomas Somers (June 19, 1916 – March 14, 1994) was the 26th mayor of Atlantic City, New Jersey, from 1969 to 1972.

== Biography ==
He was born on June 19, 1916, in Atlantic City, New Jersey. He was a Republican. As Mayor, Somers was convicted of extortion under color of official right.

He died at Shore Medical Center on March 14, 1994.
