= Claire Swift =

Member of the New Jersey General Assembly

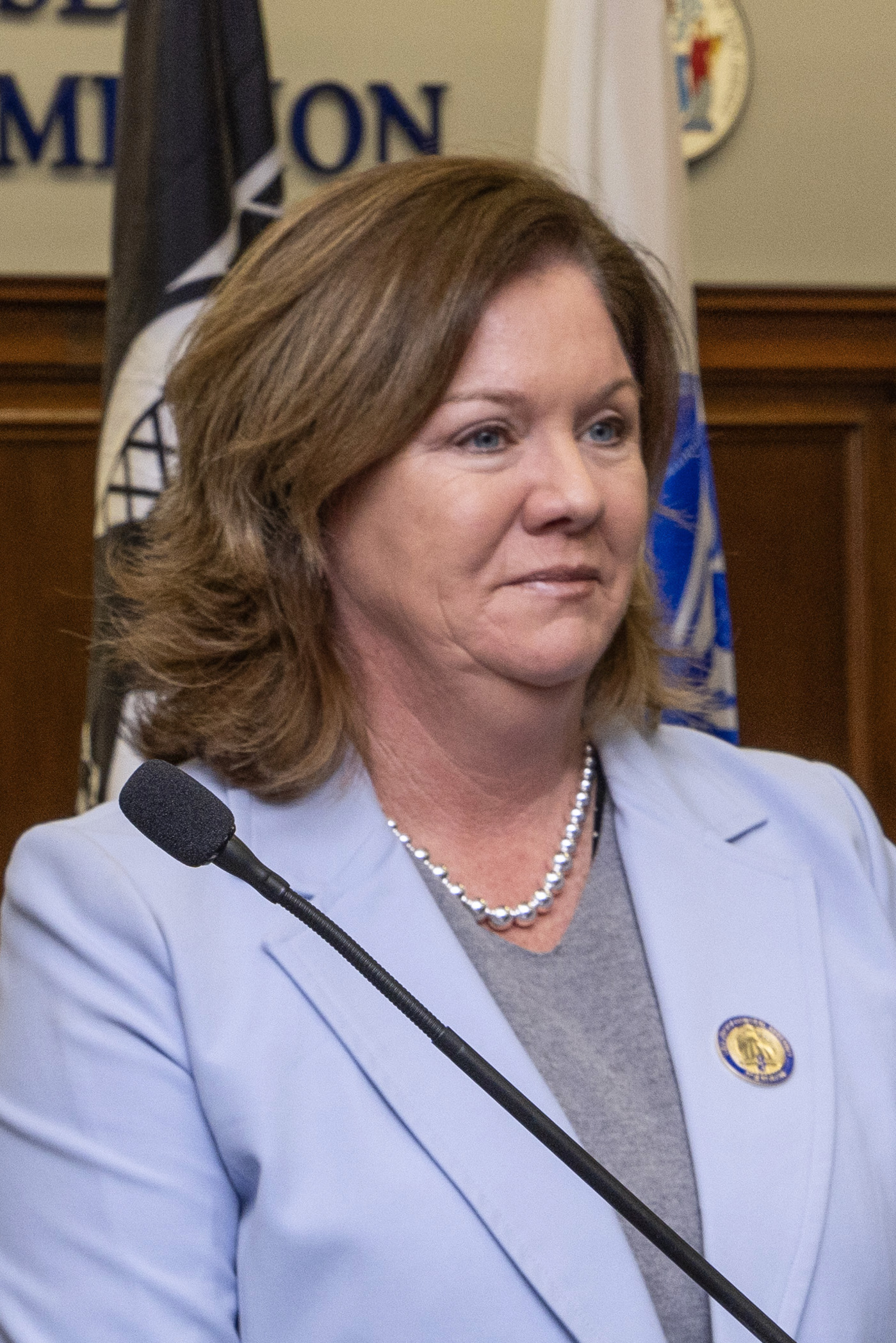
- Swift in 2024

Member of the New Jersey General Assembly from the 2nd district
- In office January 11, 2022 – January 13, 2026
- Preceded by: John Armato and Vince Mazzeo
- Succeeded by: Maureen Rowan

Personal details
- Born: June 29, 1974 (age 51)
- Party: Republican
- Education: University of Pennsylvania; Widener University Delaware Law School
- Website: Legislative webpage

Claire Swift (born June 29, 1974) is an American Republican Party politician who represented 2nd Legislative District in the New Jersey General Assembly from January 11, 2022 to January 13, 2026.

== Early life and education ==
A 1992 graduate of Atlantic City High School, Swift earned her undergraduate degree in 1996 from the University of Pennsylvania and was granted a degree in law from Widener University Delaware Law School in 1999. She was a Deputy Attorney General in New Jersey until 2003, when she joined her family law firm.

== Elective office ==
Together with her running mates incumbent Senator Vincent J. Polistina and former Atlantic City Mayor Don Guardian, Swift was elected in a Republican sweep of the district that flipped both Assembly seats from the Democrats in the 2021 New Jersey General Assembly election.

Swift was one of a record seven new Republican Assemblywomen elected in the 2022 general election, joining seven Republican women incumbents who won re-election that year.

Swift again sought re-election in 2025, though she placed fourth, losing her seat to Democrat Maureen Rowan.

=== Committees ===
During her time in the General Assembly, Swift's committees included:

- Human Services
- Labor
- Law and Public Safety

=== District 2 ===
Each of the 40 districts in the New Jersey Legislature has one representative in the New Jersey Senate and two members in the New Jersey General Assembly. During her time in the General Assembly, Swift served alongside Senator Vincent J. Polistina (R) and Assemblyman Don Guardian (R).

== Electoral history ==
2nd legislative district general election, 2025
Party	Candidate	Votes	%
Republican	Don Guardian (incumbent)	39,902	25.4%
Democratic	Maureen Rowan	39,444	25.1%
Democratic	Joanne Famularo	39,253	25.0%
Republican	Claire Swift (incumbent)	38,601	24.6%
Total votes		157,200	100.0%
Democratic gain from Republican			

2nd Legislative District General Election, 2023
Party	Candidate	Votes	%
Republican	Don Guardian (incumbent)	26,675	28.8
Republican	Claire Swift (incumbent)	25,460	27.5
Democratic	Elizabeth "Lisa" Bender	20,547	22.2
Democratic	Alphonso Harrell	19,835	21.4
Total votes		92,517	100.0
Republican hold			

2nd legislative district general election, 2021
Party	Candidate	Votes	%
Republican	Claire Swift	31,818	26.81%
Republican	Don Guardian	31,640	26.66%
Democratic	John Armato (incumbent)	28,094	23.67%
Democratic	Caren Fitzpatrick	27,127	22.86%
Total votes		118,679	100.00
Republican gain from Democratic			
