= Edward L. Bader =

American politician (1874–1927)

29th Mayor of Atlantic City
- In office 1920–1927
- Preceded by: Harry Bacharach
- Succeeded by: Anthony Ruffu

Personal details
- Born: Edward Lawrence Bader; June 8, 1874 Philadelphia, Pennsylvania, United States
- Died: January 29, 1927 (aged 52) Atlantic City, New Jersey, United States
- Party: Republican
- Spouse: Katherine Holvick
- Relatives: William B. Bader (grandson); Diedrich Bader (great-grandson)
- Education: University of Pennsylvania

Edward Lawrence Bader (June 8, 1874 – January 29, 1927) was an American politician who served as Mayor of Atlantic City, New Jersey for much of the Roaring Twenties, when the city was arguably at the peak of its popularity as a vacation spot. Bader was known for his contributions to the construction, athletics and aviation of Atlantic City.

== Early life ==
Bader grew up on an 80-acre (32 ha) farm in West Philadelphia, born to German immigrant Daniel Bader and Scottish immigrant Sarah Bader (née Boyle) in 1874. He had a brother, Harry Bader.

Until he turned 13, he attended Boon's Dam School, though he recalled skipping a good deal of class. He worked a number of chores on the family farm, and he credited this rural labor with building his athletic physique. His family could not afford his further education which led him to champion educational growth in Atlantic City as an adult.

Bader sold newspapers, after leaving school, then worked for his father's new contracting business where he drove a six-horse team. He was married in 1899 to Katherine Holvick and enrolled in college. First he attended dental school, then the veterinary school, and finally the Wharton School of Business at the University of Pennsylvania.

Originally Bader intended to earn money by playing football while attending college, but when he learned that he would have to be a student for a year before being allowed to play, he left and joined the Latrobe Athletic Association, the first professional football team in the United States. At a height of 5 ft 10.5 in (1.79 m) and a weight of 195 pounds (88 kg), Bader helped Latrobe win an unofficial "United States Championship".

== Early career ==
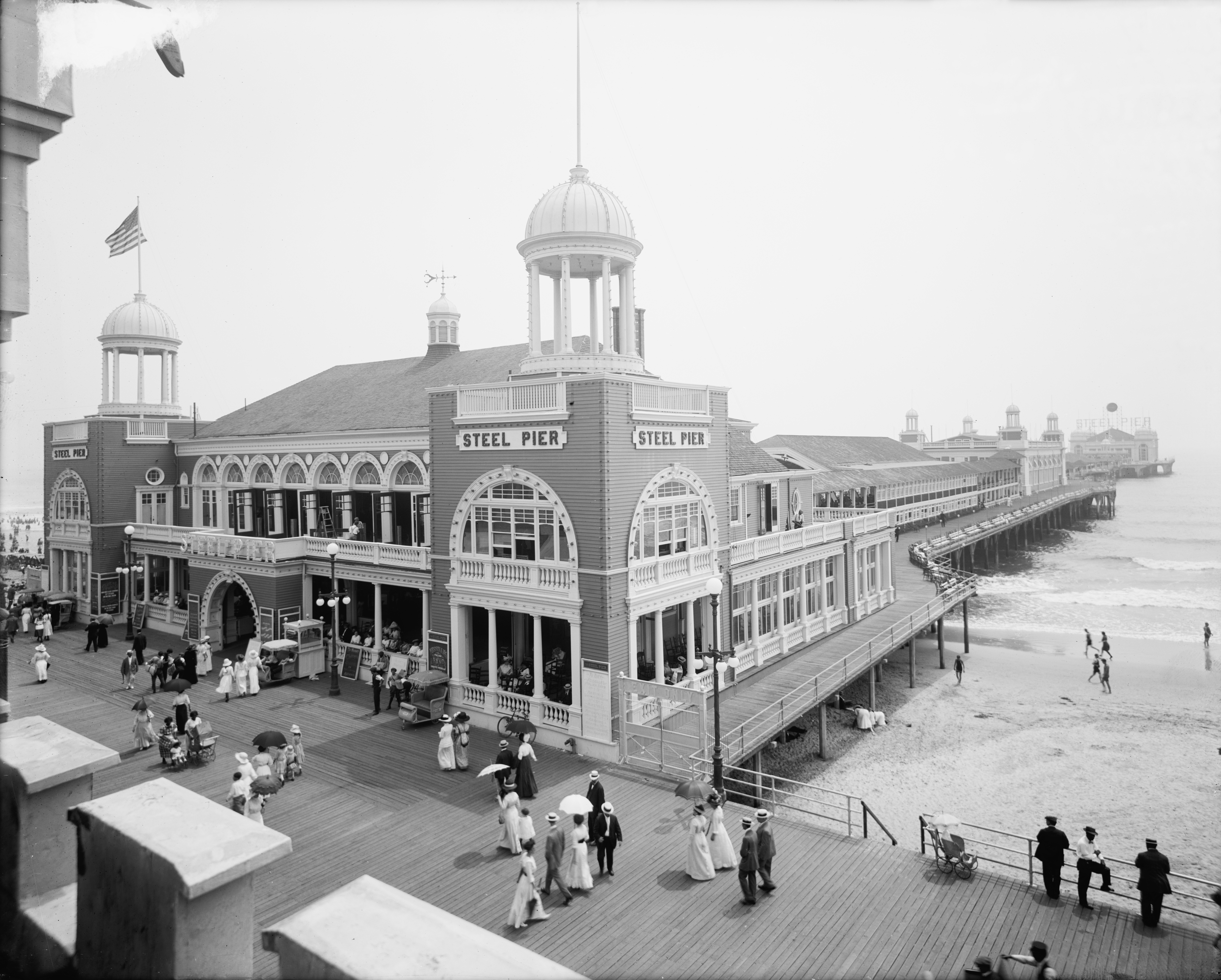
Steel Pier between 1910 and 1920

After a year with Latrobe, Bader returned to work full-time. He also played a year for the Philadelphia Athletics professional football team operated by Connie Mack of the same-named baseball team. He became a superintendent for his father's contracting company. In 1902, he set up a garbage-collecting operation for his father in Atlantic City. After two years, he started his own contracting business.

In 1904, a storm washed away part of Steel Pier and many engineers stated that it could not be rebuilt but Bader and his company accepted the challenge to rebuild it. His success with that job led to more work in Atlantic City. His next major project was the paving of the five miles of Albany Avenue in Atlantic City to Pleasantville which is now part of the Black Horse Pike that passes by a field that bears his name.

Bader's contracting business was successful for the next few years working several projects in Atlantic City and along the East Coast of the United States. An active Republican, politically, he was involved with local charities, and he was a member of the Benevolent and Protective Order of Elks, Moose International, Fraternal Order of Eagles and the Knights of Columbus. His wife and he had four children, including a son, Daniel, who would later become an Atlantic City city commissioner.

Bader was an avid sports booster. He fielded basketball teams, organized Atlantic City's first professional football team - the Blue Tornadoes - and owned a boxing gym on North New Hampshire Avenue. Before world-title Boxing bouts sponsored by casinos he would regularly bring world-class boxers to Atlantic City to fight. He developed a friendship with Boxing champion Jack Dempsey and was rumoured to be a potential manager for him in 1921. He formed Atlantic City High School's band and encouraged high school athletics.

== Politics ==
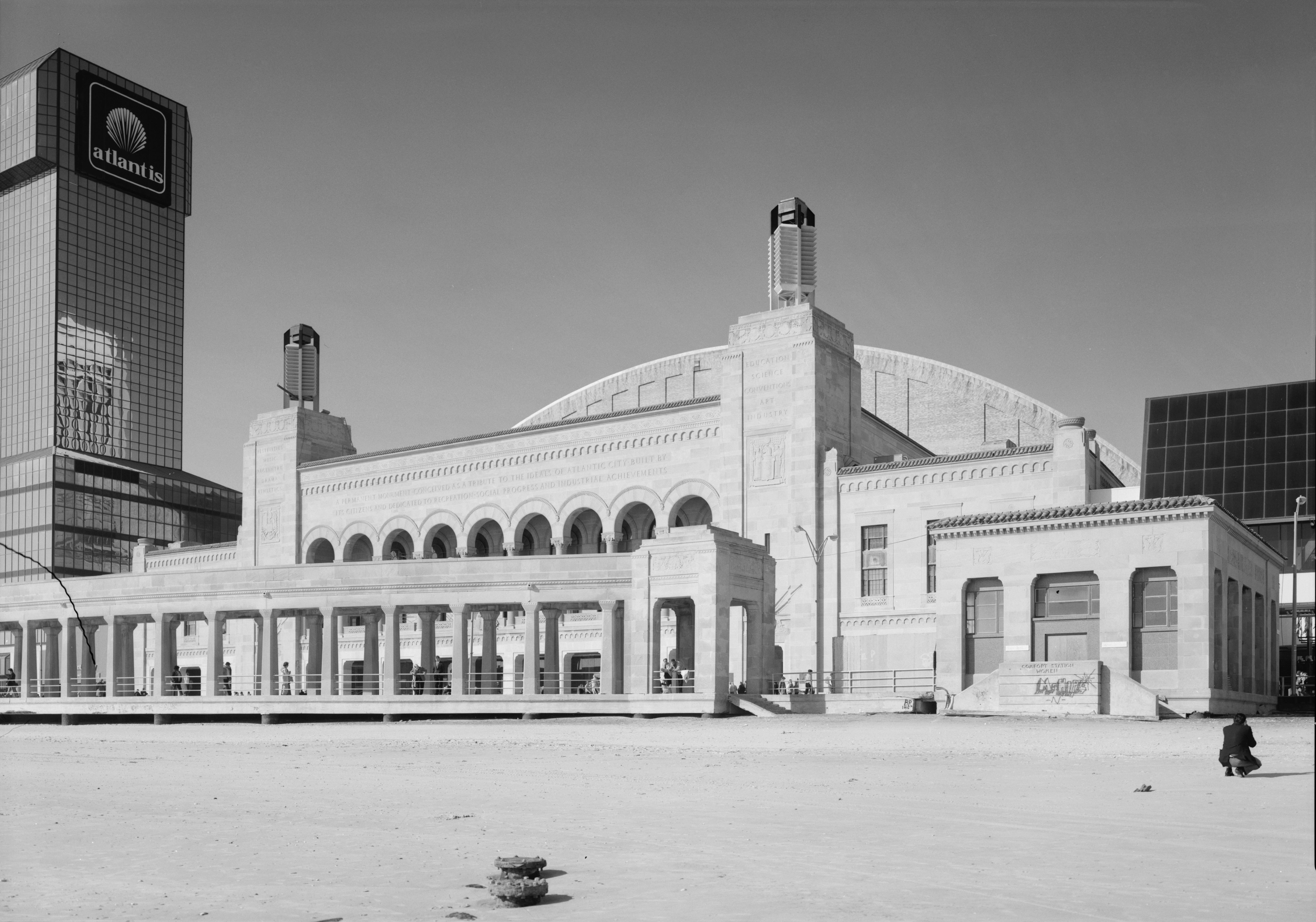
Convention Hall

Bader's Republican allies, including political boss and racketeer Nucky Johnson, convinced him to run for city commission in 1920. Winning his seat he was chosen by his fellow commissioners to serve as mayor. In 1924, he was re-elected.

In 1920, Bader was elected Mayor of Atlantic City, New Jersey.

Bader spoke out against a Ku Klux Klan meeting in Atlantic City in 1923. He also pushed the idea of the city residents organizing a beauty pageant that became known as Miss America.

Despite the opposition of many others, he purchased land that became the city's municipal airport and high school football stadium; both of which were later named Bader Field in his honor. He led the initiative, in 1923, to construct the high school at Albany and Atlantic Avenues. Bader, in November 1923, initiated a public referendum, during the general election, at which time residents approved the construction of a Convention Center. The city passed an ordinance approving a bond issue for $1.5 million to be used for the purchase of land for Convention Hall, now Boardwalk Hall, finalized September 30, 1924. Construction of it was underway at the time of his death.

Bader ordered decency laws for bathers on the beaches of Atlantic City, July 14, 1924. Women were permitted to wear one-piece suits provided they also wore a skirt with it. The New York Times edition for March 27, 1924, read: "The official regulation provides that the bottom of the tights shall be no shorter than four inches above the knee and the bottom of the skirt no higher than seven inches above the knee." Prohibited in previous years, bare legs were allowed. Additionally, Atlantic City passed a "macintosh law" which required that anyone in beach attire had to wear a coat reaching at least to the knees. The Times reported that police turned back hundreds of would-be bathers: "Mayor Edward L. Bader ordered this action on complaints that bathers were sometimes unclad to the point of indecency, while with others their wet suits were a nuisance."

== Filmography ==
Series

- Buster Brown (1916–1930)
- The Teenie Weenies (1917–1922)

== Death ==
Bader was stricken by a stomach ailment in mid-January 1927. Doctors, originally, did not properly diagnose it as appendicitis because his appendix was on the left, rather than the right side of his torso. Initially asked to rest at home, he was later moved to the City Hospital and underwent surgery. In an effort to speed his recovery, city policemen fanned out along the street in front of the hospital to prevent any unnecessary noise.

Originally given a good chance to recover because of his strong physique, Bader's condition worsened, and on the evening of January 29, 1927, he was given last rites by a priest. For a bedside vigil his family was joined by a few local dignitaries, including Commissioner Anthony Ruffu (who would succeed Bader as mayor), Assemblyman Anthony Siracusa and political power-broker Nucky Johnson.

Just before midnight Bader died.

His body lay in state at St. Nicholas of Tolentine Church, of which he was a member, and it was then carried out in a five-mile-long procession down the White Horse Pike to Holy Cross Cemetery. Mourners of diverse racial background mourned his death and all businesses in the city closed for two hours during the funeral as a mark of respect.

== In popular culture ==
Bader was played by actor Kevin O'Rourke in the HBO television series Boardwalk Empire.

== See also ==
- Diedrich Bader
- William B. Bader

Political offices
Preceded by Harry Bacharach	Mayor of Atlantic City; 1920–1929	Succeeded by Anthony M. Ruffu
