= Gretta Bader =

American sculptor (1931–2014)

- Bader standing before her sculpture of Sen. J. William Fulbright at the University of Arkansas in 2002
- Born: Margaret Marie Lange; May 25, 1931; Germany
- Died: August 1, 2014 (aged 83); Washington, D.C., U.S.
- Resting place: Arlington National Cemetery
- Known for: Sculpture
- Spouse: William B. Bader
- Children: 4, including Diedrich Bader

Gretta Lange Bader (née Margaret Marie Lange; May 25, 1931 – August 1, 2014) was an American sculptor best known for her bronze portrait work.

== Biography ==
Margaret Marie Lange was educated at Pomona College, where she met her future husband William B. Bader, graduating in 1953. She studied at the Academy of Fine Arts Munich after marrying Bader. She continued studying art at the Corcoran School of Art and the Rhode Island School of Design. She taught at the Art League School in Alexandria, Virginia, chairing its Department of Sculpture from 1984 to 1989. She was a visiting scholar at the American Academy in Rome.

With her husband, she had four children, Christopher, Katharine, John and actor Diedrich Bader. She died of congestive heart failure in Washington, D.C., on August 1, 2014, aged 83.

== Works ==
Sculptures by Bader can be found in the National Portrait Gallery and the National Building Museum.

She completed over 30 full-size portrait sculptures, including sculptures of J. William Fulbright (at the University of Arkansas), Frank Church, Claiborne Pell, Donald Ross (at Pinehurst Resort), and Ben Bradlee, former editor of The Washington Post. She completed hundreds of busts, including 234 designed in 1984 for the National Building Museum.
