= Lorenzo Langford =

American politician

Mayor of Atlantic City
- In office 2008–2014
- Preceded by: Scott K. Evans
- Succeeded by: Don Guardian
- In office January 1, 2002 – 2006
- Preceded by: Jim Whelan
- Succeeded by: Bob Levy

Atlantic City Councilman
- In office 1992–2001

Personal details
- Born: September 1955 (age 70–71) Atlantic City, New Jersey
- Party: Democratic

Lorenzo Tyrone Langford (born c. 1955) is an American Democratic Party politician from Atlantic City, New Jersey. He is a former Mayor of Atlantic City, New Jersey and was the resort city's second African American mayor.

== Biography ==
Langford was educated in the Atlantic City public school system and graduated from Atlantic City High School, Class of 1973. He first went to Atlantic Community College (now Atlantic Cape Community College) and then to North Carolina Central University where he earned a Bachelor of Science Degree in Business Administration. Langford worked at casinos for 10 years, first as a dealer and eventually as a pit boss, but left when he was elected to City Council.

In 1992, Langford ran for City Council in the Fourth Ward and defeated the incumbent Council President in an upset. He was twice re-elected to his ward seat while unsuccessfully running for mayor in 1993 and 1997 against incumbent Jim Whelan.

On November 6, 2001, Langford was elected mayor, defeating Whelan 56 to 43 percent on the strength of absentee ballots.

Langford left office at the end of his term after losing the 2005 primary to Bob Levy.

In the special election mayoral primary in June 2008 following Levy's resignation, Langford defeated incumbent mayor Scott Evans. Langford easily won the special mayoral election on November 4, 2008, by a wide margin to serve out the remainder of Levy's term.

Backed by the local Democratic organization, Langford won a contentious June 2009 primary election against 2nd Ward Councilman Marty Small, who was supported by Whelan. In the November General Election, Langford won a full four-year term by defeating Republican candidate Jesse Kurtz with nearly a three to one margin. New Jersey's Attorney General has brought voter fraud charges against Small and 13 campaign workers for allegedly submitting absentee ballots for people who did not vote. A jury found them not guilty in March 2011.

On October 29, 2012, Mayor Lorenzo Langford was criticized by Governor Chris Christie for his handling of evacuations ahead of Hurricane Sandy. Christie said he had heard that Langford had told the city's residents that they could ride out the storm at home or in a school a block from the ocean, directly contradicting the governor's evacuation order. "You have a mayor, a rogue mayor, telling his citizens not to leave, that it's O.K. not to leave," Mr. Christie said. "I don't know what you call that. I don't call it effective governance." The remarks came during Mr. Christie's early evening news briefing on the storm at the state emergency command center in West Trenton. Newspaper articles from the weekend indicate that Langford encouraged residents to leave the city if they could, but city schools would be opened as a "shelter of last resort" for late evacuees. Mr. Christie spoke directly to those who stayed behind, saying the storm had grown too close and they would have to wait out the storm until it was safer for emergency workers to return. The governor recently said Mr. Langford had "failed" as mayor and was "impossible to work with in any significant kind of way," according to The Press.

In the city's 2013 mayoral election, Langford was defeated by his Republican opponent Don Guardian. He left office on January 1, 2014.

Political offices
Preceded by Scott K. Evans	Mayor of Atlantic City; 2008–2014	Succeeded by Don Guardian
Preceded by Jim Whelan	Mayor of Atlantic City; 2001–2005	Succeeded by Bob Levy
