= Don Guardian =

Member of the New Jersey General Assembly

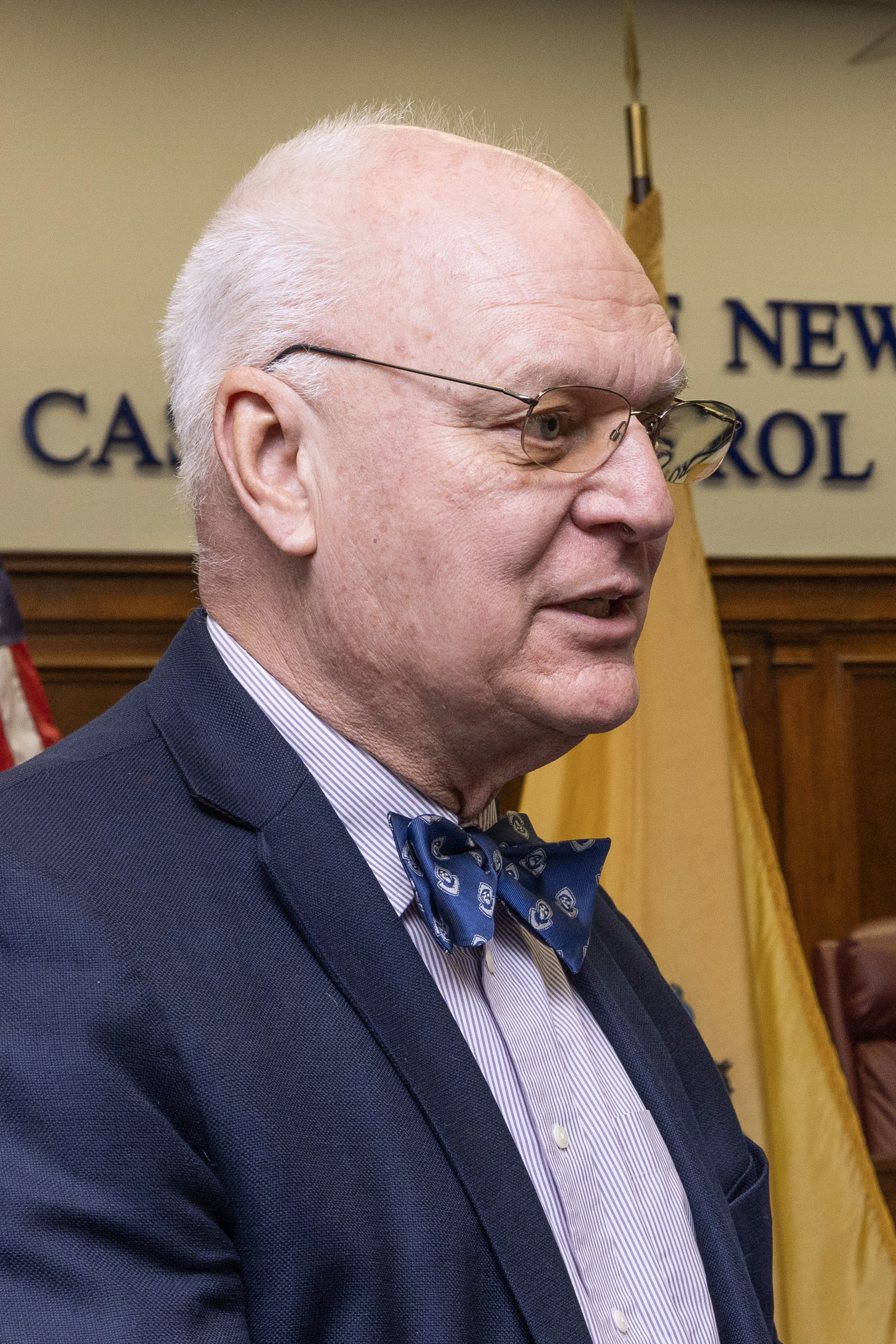

Member of the New Jersey General Assembly from the 2nd district
- Incumbent
- Assumed office January 11, 2022 Serving with Maureen Rowan
- Preceded by: Vince Mazzeo; John Armato

39th Mayor of Atlantic City
- In office January 1, 2014 – December 31, 2017
- Preceded by: Lorenzo Langford
- Succeeded by: Frank Gilliam

Personal details
- Born: June 12, 1953 (age 72)
- Party: Republican
- Domestic partner: Louis Fatato
- Education: Upsala College
- Website: State Assembly website

Donald A. Guardian (born June 12, 1953) is an American Republican Party politician who has represented 2nd Legislative District in the New Jersey General Assembly since taking office on January 11, 2022, becoming the first openly gay Republican legislator in state history. He served as the mayor of Atlantic City, New Jersey, from 2014 to 2017.

== Early life and education ==
Raised in Palisades Park, New Jersey, and West New York, Guardian graduated from Don Bosco Preparatory High School. He graduated in 1975 from Upsala College.

Before being elected mayor, Guardian served as an executive with the Boy Scouts of America and at the Claridge Hotel, and headed Atlantic City's Special Improvement District for two decades prior to his election as mayor.

After his time as mayor, Guardian was named as Business Administrator by the Toms River, New Jersey Township Council, for which he was paid an annual salary of $175,000.

== Elective office ==
On January 19, 2013, Guardian announced that he was challenging incumbent mayor Lorenzo Langford. He won the Republican primary unopposed. On November 5, Guardian defeated Langford by 50% to 47%. In the 2013 United States elections, he defeated incumbent Democratic mayor Lorenzo Langford to become Atlantic City's first openly gay mayor and first Republican mayor since 1990. In the 2017 election, Guardian lost re-election to Democratic city councilman, Frank Gilliam.

Guardian and fellow Republican Claire Swift won the 2021 New Jersey General Assembly election, defeating the Democratic slate of incumbent Assemblyman John Armato and Atlantic County Commissioner Caren Fitzpatrick; the district's other Assemblyman, Democrat Vince Mazzeo, did not seek reelection to the Assembly in order to make what would ultimately be an unsuccessful bid for the district's State Senate seat.

On January 11, 2022, Guardian was sworn in to the New Jersey General Assembly, making him the first openly gay Republican legislator in state history and the only openly gay member of the New Jersey Legislature.

=== Committees ===
Committee assignments for the current session are:

- Community Development and Women's Affairs
- Oversight, Reform, and Federal Relations
- Tourism, Gaming and the Arts

=== District 2 ===
Each of the 40 districts in the New Jersey Legislature has one representative in the New Jersey Senate and two members in the New Jersey General Assembly. The representatives from the 2nd District for the 2026—27 Legislative Session are:

- Senator Vincent J. Polistina (R)
- Assemblyman Don Guardian (R)
- Assemblywomman Maureen Rowan (D)

== Electoral history ==
2nd legislative district general election, 2025
Party	Candidate	Votes	%
Republican	Don Guardian (incumbent)	39,902	25.4%
Democratic	Maureen Rowan	39,444	25.1%
Democratic	Joanne Famularo	39,253	25.0%
Republican	Claire Swift (incumbent)	38,601	24.6%
Total votes		157,200	100.0%

2nd Legislative District general election, 2023
Party	Candidate	Votes	%
Republican	Don Guardian (incumbent)	26,675	28.8
Republican	Claire Swift (incumbent)	25,460	27.5
Democratic	Elizabeth "Lisa" Bender	20,547	22.2
Democratic	Alphonso Harrell	19,835	21.4
Total votes		92,517	100.0
Republican hold			

2nd legislative district general election, 2021
Party	Candidate	Votes	%
Republican	Claire Swift	31,818	26.81%
Republican	Don Guardian	31,640	26.66%
Democratic	John Armato (incumbent)	28,094	23.67%
Democratic	Caren Fitzpatrick	27,127	22.86%
Total votes		118,679	100.00
Republican gain from Democratic			

Political offices
Preceded by Lorenzo Langford	Mayor of Atlantic City; 2014–2017	Succeeded by Frank Gilliam
