= Barry Beckham =

American playwright (born 1944)

- Born: 1944 (age 81–82); Philadelphia, United States
- Education: Brown University
- Occupations: Playwright and novelist
- Notable work: Runner Mack (1972)
- Website: www.barrybeckham.com

Barry Earl Beckham (born March 19, 1944) is an American playwright and novelist.

== Biography ==
Beckham was born in 1944 in Philadelphia, United States, to Clarence and Mildred (née William) Beckham. At the age of nine, he moved with his mother to a black neighborhood in Atlantic City, New Jersey. He graduated from Atlantic City High School and in 1962 he entered Brown University as one of only eight black students in the freshman year and one of three black graduates in 1966.

He began his first novel, My Main Mother (1969), while in his senior year at Brown University. Beckham completed the novel at the age of 25 in 1969. He graduated in 1966 with a degree in English. His second novel, Runner Mack (1972), was nominated for a National Book Award.

His play Garvey Lives!, about Jamaican-born Black Nationalist Marcus Garvey, was produced by George Houston Bass of the Rites and Reason Theatre, a black theatre group at Brown University.

Beckham returned to Brown in 1970 as a visiting lecturer in English and African American Studies. He had a 17-year career at the university, including several years as the head of the graduate creative writing program.
