= Maureen Rowan =

NJ Assembly Member

Member of the New Jersey General Assembly from the 2nd district
- Incumbent
- Assumed office January 13, 2026 Serving with Don Guardian
- Preceded by: Claire Swift

Personal details
- Party: Democratic
- Website: Legislative webpage

Maureen Rowan is an American Democratic Party politician who has represented the 2nd Legislative District in the New Jersey General Assembly since taking office in January 2026.

== Elective Office ==
She was first elected in 2025, defeating incumbent Claire Swift. A retired attorney living in Atlantic City, she serves alongside Don Guardian, a Republican, making the district just one of three in the state with both Democratic and Republican assembly members.

The 2nd District, which includes most of Atlantic County, has a strong Democratic edge in party affiliation. Her victory made her one of four Democratic challengers to unseat a Republican incumbent in 2025 and the third woman (and first female Democrat) to ever represent the district in the New Jersey Legislature.

=== Committees ===
Committee Assignments for the current session are:

- Community Development and Women's Affairs
- Oversight, Reform, and Federal Relations
- Tourism, Gaming, and the Arts

=== District 2 ===
Each of the 40 districts in the New Jersey Legislature has one representative in the New Jersey Senate and two members in the New Jersey General Assembly. The representatives from the 2nd District for the 2026—27 Legislative Session are:

- Senator Vincent J. Polistina (R)
- Assemblyman Don Guardian (R)
- Assemblywoman Maureen Rowan (D)

== Electoral history ==
2nd legislative district general election, 2025
Party	Candidate	Votes	%
Republican	Don Guardian (incumbent)	39,902	25.4%
Democratic	Maureen Rowan	39,444	25.1%
Democratic	Joanne Famularo	39,253	25.0%
Republican	Claire Swift (incumbent)	38,601	24.6%
Total votes		157,200	100.0%
