= John Armato =

American Democratic Party politician

Member of the New Jersey General Assembly from the 2nd district
- In office January 9, 2018 – January 11, 2022 Serving with Vince Mazzeo
- Preceded by: Chris A. Brown
- Succeeded by: Don Guardian; Claire Swift

Personal details
- Born: June 13, 1948 (age 78) Buena Vista Township, New Jersey, U.S.
- Party: Democratic
- Spouse: Marie
- Children: 2
- Occupation: Politician and HVAC mechanic
- Website: Legislative Website

Military service
- Years of service: 1967–1971
- Rank: Sergeant
- Unit: 25th Infantry Division

John Armato (born June 13, 1948) is an American Democratic Party politician who represented the 2nd Legislative District in the New Jersey General Assembly from 2018 to 2022. He replaced Chris A. Brown, who relinquished his seat to run successfully for a seat in the New Jersey Senate.

== Early life ==
A life-long resident of Buena Vista, Armato graduated from Vineland High School in 1966 and served in the United States Air Force from 1967 to 1971. He has worked as an HVAC mechanic. Before being elected to the Assembly, Armato served for three years on the Township Committee of Buena Vista Township.

== New Jersey Assembly ==
With Republican Party Chris A. Brown leaving the Assembly to run for New Jersey State Senate in the November 2017 general election, Armato (with 25,683 votes; 26.6%) and his running mate, incumbent Vince Mazzeo (with 27,601; 28.6%), defeated Republican challengers Vince Sera (20,814; 21.5%) and Brenda Taube (20,611; 21.3%) to win both Assembly seats from the district for the Democrats. Armato serves in the Assembly on the Commerce and Economic Development Committee; the Health and Senior Services Committee; and the Military and Veterans' Affairs Committee. Armato has said he doesn't plan on challenging Senator Chris A. Brown in 2021.

During his tenure in the legislature, Armato has introduced legislation on behalf of first responders and disabled veterans. He introduced a legislative constitutional amendment, ACR48, which would amend the Constitution to give a total property tax exemption to honorably discharged permanently and totally disabled peacetime veterans. Another bill he introduced, A2692, would allow local governments like cities to create restricted parking spaces for certain volunteer firefighters.

To help combat the opioid epidemic, Armato introduced legislation, A3869, that requires doctors and other prescribers to prescribe opioid overdose medication to any patient who is at risk for opioid overdose.

In 2019, Armato was reelected by a smaller margin than expected, winning a second term by 989 votes.

=== Committees ===
- Commerce and Economic Development
- Health and Senior Services
- Military and Veterans' Affairs

== Electoral history ==
=== Assembly ===
2nd legislative district general election, 2021
Party	Candidate	Votes	%
Republican	Claire Swift	31,818	26.81%
Republican	Don Guardian	31,640	26.66%
Democratic	John Armato (incumbent)	28,094	23.67%
Democratic	Caren Fitzpatrick	27,127	22.86%
Total votes		118,679	100.00
Republican gain from Democratic			

2019 New Jersey General Assembly election for the 2nd Legislative District
Party	Candidate	Votes	%	±%
Democratic	Vince Mazzeo (Incumbent)	23,211	26.71%	▼1.85%
Democratic	John Armato (Incumbent)	21,895	25.19	▼1.39%
Republican	John W. Risley	20,906	24.05	▲1.85
Republican	Phil Guenther	20,905	24.05	▲1.39%
Total votes		86,717	100.0%	

New Jersey general election, 2017
Party	Candidate	Votes	%	±%
Democratic	Vince Mazzeo	27,601	28.6	▲3.1
Democratic	John Armato	25,683	26.6	▲2.2
Republican	Vince Sera	20,814	21.5	▼5.0
Republican	Brenda Taube	20,611	21.3	▼2.3
Independent, Honest, Reliable	Heather Gordon	1,208	1.3	N/A
Green	Mico Lucide	718	0.7	N/A
Total votes		'96,635'	'100.0'	

New Jersey General Assembly
Preceded by Chris A. Brown	Member of the New Jersey General Assembly for the 2nd District; January 9, 2018–January 11, 2022; With: Vince Mazzeo	Succeeded by Don Guardian; Claire Swift
