= 2017 Atlantic City mayoral election =

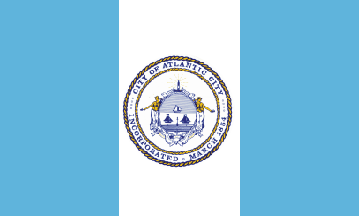
- November 7, 2017
Nominee	Frank Gilliam	Don Guardian
Party	Democratic	Republican
Popular vote	4,220	2,824
Percentage	57.68%	38.60%
Mayor before election
Don Guardian
Republican
Elected mayor
Frank Gilliam
Democratic

The 2017 Atlantic City mayoral election was held on November 7, 2017, to elect the mayor of Atlantic City, New Jersey. Primary elections were held on June 6. Incumbent Republican Don Guardian lost re-election to a second term to Democratic city councilman Frank Gilliam.

== Republican primary ==
=== Candidates ===
On March 18, the Atlantic City Republican County Committee endorsed Don Guardian for mayor, with him receiving five votes, Joseph Polillo two votes, and three members not voting. Subsequently, Polillo dropped out of the primary and decided to continue running for mayor as an independent.

==== Declared ====
- Don Guardian, incumbent mayor

==== Withdrawn ====
- Joseph Polillo, retired license inspector and perennial candidate (running as an independent)

=== Results ===
Republican primary results
Party	Candidate	Votes	%
Republican	Donald A. Guardian	359	99.17
Republican	Write-In	3	0.83
Total votes		362	100

== Democratic primary ==
=== Candidates ===
On April 3, the Atlantic City Democratic Committee endorsed Frank Gilliam for mayor, with him receiving 27 votes, Marty Small three votes, and Fareed Abdullah one vote.

==== Declared ====
- Fareed Abdullah, substitute teacher and candidate for city council in 2009 and 2013
- Frank Gilliam, city councilman
- Marty Small, city council president
- Jimmy Whitehead, Navy veteran

=== Results ===
Despite narrowly losing the primary day voting to Small by a count of 1,529–1,429, Gilliam was in the lead overall thanks to a substantial advantage on absentee ballots (694–209). Small sought a recount, which was granted by a state Superior Court judge. However, little changed in the recount and the result was upheld.

Democratic primary results
Party	Candidate	Votes	%
Democratic	Frank M. Gilliam, Jr.	2,147	49.31
Democratic	Marty Small, Sr.	1,775	40.77
Democratic	Jimmy Whitehead	262	6.02
Democratic	Fareed Abdullah	169	3.88
Democratic	Write-In	1	0.02
Total votes		4,354	100

== Independents and third parties ==
=== Candidates ===
==== Declared ====
- Henry "Hank" Green (Green), radio show host and producer
- Joseph Polillo (Independent), retired license inspector and perennial candidate

== General election ==
=== Results ===
Atlantic City mayoral election, 2017
Party	Candidate	Votes	%
Democratic	Frank M. Gilliam, Jr.	4,220	57.68
Republican	Donald A. Guardian	2,824	38.60
Polillo's Last Stand	Joseph J. Polillo	150	2.05
Green	Henry A. Green	120	1.64
Write-In	Personal Choice	2	0.03
Total votes		7,316	100
