= Bob Levy (New Jersey politician) =

American politician (born 1947)

Robert W. Levy Sr.

Mayor of Atlantic City, New Jersey
- In office January 1, 2006 – October 10, 2007
- Preceded by: Lorenzo Langford
- Succeeded by: Scott Evans

Personal details
- Born: May 16, 1947 (age 78) Atlantic City, New Jersey
- Party: Democratic
- Spouse: Hazel Washington

Robert W. Levy, Sr., known as Bob Levy (born May 16, 1947, in Atlantic City, New Jersey), is a Democratic politician and the former Mayor of Atlantic City, New Jersey. In September 2007, Levy disappeared from Atlantic City without telling the public or the press why he was leaving. His sudden absence sparked a controversy over who should become the acting mayor of Atlantic City. On October 10, 2007, attorneys for Levy announced his resignation, effective immediately.

== Early life ==
Levy is a lifelong resident of Atlantic City. He became a lifeguard in 1960 and married in 1964 after graduating from Atlantic City High School. Levy married Hazel Washington, an African American woman, and experienced hostility from his own family for the interracial marriage.

=== Military career ===
Shortly after his marriage, Levy enlisted in the U.S. Army. After basic and advanced infantry training at Fort Dix, New Jersey, basic airborne training at Fort Benning, Georgia, and an eight-week field communications course Levy was assigned to Fort Knox, Kentucky, as a field communications crewman. In August 1965 Levy was sent to Würzburg, Germany, before being assigned to the 1st Aviation Battalion, 1st Infantry Division in Vietnam. In April 1967 Levy returned to the United States and was assigned to Fort Hood, Texas. In 1970 Levy began his second tour in Vietnam. In June 1971 he came back to the U.S. and after leave became a tactical communications chief instructor for 10 months at Fort Dix. During his tours during the Vietnam War he was awarded two Bronze Stars. In June 1972 Levy began working as an army recruiting officer in Toms River, New Jersey, and later, starting in February 1974, Atlantic City. Levy was named Atlantic City's station commander in 1976 and in 1980 was assigned to 1st Battalion, 19th Field Artillery in Fort Carson, Colorado, and promoted to First Sergeant. Levy stayed in Colorado until 1982 when he returned to New Jersey at Fort Monmouth in September where he stayed until he retired in 1984.

=== Return to Atlantic City ===
After he retired Levy went back to being a lifeguard and in 1986 became the chief lifeguard and beach patrol chief. Between 1990 and 2003, appointed by then-Mayor Jim Whelan, Levy served as Atlantic City's Emergency Management Director. From 1998 to 2006 Levy headed the Department of Emergency Services. After being a lifelong Republican, Levy switched party affiliation to Democrat in 2004.

Levy entered the race for mayor of Atlantic City after City Council President Craig Callaway withdrew from the Democratic mayoral primary in 2005. With backing from Callaway and his supporters, Levy beat incumbent mayor Lorenzo T. Langford in the Democratic primary. Levy went on to easily win the mayoral election against independent candidate Joseph Polillo.

== False claims of service and the federal investigation ==
As early as 1980, Levy began to claim he was a member of U.S. Army Special Forces. The claim was also on campaign literature during his 2005 campaign for mayor. After doubts of Levy's Green Beret service were expressed to The Press of Atlantic City by James Simmons, a Vietnam War veteran, in September 2006, the newspaper began investigating Levy's war records and discovered there was no record he was in the U.S. Special Forces. In November 2006 The Press of Atlantic City planned on publishing its findings and Levy admitted to the newspaper he was never in the U.S. Special Forces. Upon this information, federal investigators began to examine whether or not Levy properly obtained a Combat Infantryman Badge (CIB) that he used to obtain additional veterans' benefits. Levy admitted that he lied about receiving the CIB as well as Parachutist Badge or "jump wings". Levy also admitted that there were false entries on his official service record which he did not correct and that he used these false entries to obtain benefits.

=== Disappearance ===
In late September 2007, rumors began to emerge about the federal investigation and questions were raised about whether or not Levy would resign as mayor. On September 26, 2007, after signing seven ordinances into law, Levy left Atlantic City in a city-issued Dodge Durango for an unknown destination. Administration officials said Levy was on temporary medical leave, but refused to say where he went. His lawyer later revealed that Levy had checked into the Carrier Clinic in Belle Mead, New Jersey, about two hours north of Atlantic City. At the time of Mayor Levy's unexplained disappearance, Atlantic City Business Administrator Domenic Cappella told officials and the press that Levy had verbally designated him as acting mayor of Atlantic City.

During the Atlantic City Council meeting on October 3, 2007, both members of the public and the council demanded the Business Administrator yield the office of Acting Mayor of Atlantic City to the President of the City Council, William Marsh. On October 5, 2007, claiming that the "mysterious disappearance of Mayor Levy is now a national news story causing significant embarrassment and exposing the city to unwarranted risk", Councilman Bruce Ward filed suit in Superior Court asking for a declaratory judgment that the Office of Mayor of Atlantic City was vacant. That same day Governor Jon Corzine offered state assistance and staff to help the city, and stated that Levy's disappearance was "dysfunctional and chaotic behavior," and that "the situation today can't go on for an extended period of time.".

=== Resignation and aftermath ===
On October 9, a Superior Court Judge indicated she would rule on whether the mayor's seat was vacant or not by October 12, and administration officials released a letter from Levy's lawyer to the Business Administrator dated September 28 explaining that Levy had checked into the Carrier Clinic and was about to leave and spend time recovering at home. One day after this letter was released, Levy's lawyer announced that Levy had resigned, effective immediately. Levy's attorney cited health issues and the pending Federal Department of Veterans Affairs investigation for the resignation.

After pleading guilty of defrauding the U.S. Department of Veterans Affairs in November 2007, Levy was sentenced to three years' probation and a US$5,000 fine, and ordered to pay over US$25,198 in restitution to the Department of Veterans Affairs. The July 25, 2008, ruling also required Levy to continue his court-ordered psychiatric treatment. The judge noted that Levy seems to be continuing to embellish his military record, by claiming he helped out the Pathfinders, which does not appear on his record.

Political offices
| Preceded by Lorenzo T. Langford | Mayor of Atlantic City; 2006–2007 | Succeeded by Scott Evans |
