= George Kin Leung =

- 梁社乾
- Born: July 17, 1899
- Died: 1977 (aged 77–78)

George Kin Leung (Chinese: 梁社乾; July 17, 1899 – 1977) was a Chinese-American translator of Chinese literature.

== Early life ==
Leung was born on July 17, 1899, in Atlantic City, New Jersey. Both his mother, Mamie Chan Bing, and father, Joe Hing Leung, emigrated from Hong Kong. Leung attended Atlantic City High School, graduating in 1918.

== Translation career ==
=== The True Story of Ah Q ===
Leung's translation of Lu Xun's The True Story of Ah Q was published by the Commercial Press in Shanghai in 1926. The translation was labeled "excellent" by The China Weekly Review.
