= Scott K. Evans =

Mayor of Atlantic City
- In office November 21, 2007 – November 13, 2008
- Preceded by: William Marsh
- Succeeded by: Lorenzo T. Langford

Personal details
- Born: September 8, 1965 (age 60) Atlantic City, New Jersey, U.S.
- Party: Democratic

Scott K. Evans (born September 8, 1965) is an American Democratic politician and the former Mayor of Atlantic City, New Jersey. Evans is Fire Chief with the Atlantic City Fire Department.

== Biography ==
He was born on September 8, 1965, in Atlantic City, New Jersey.

He was the chairman of the Atlantic City Democratic Committee when former Mayor Bob Levy resigned in October 2007. Following state law, the party Evans chaired nominated Evans and two other people to serve as mayor until the next general election. City Council then picked Evans from the three candidates. Evans lost the city Democratic party mayoral nomination on June 3, 2008, to Lorenzo Langford and the city Democratic party chairmanship on June 9, 2008, to Robert "Bob" McDevitt. He left the mayor's office December 31, 2008.

Political offices
Preceded by William Marsh	Mayor of Atlantic City; 2007–2008	Succeeded by Lorenzo T. Langford
