= Harry Bacharach =

American mayor (1873–1947)

Harry Bacharach (October 24, 1873 – May 13, 1947) was the Mayor of Atlantic City, New Jersey, in 1912 for 6 months, and from 1916 to 1920, and again from 1930 to 1935. A Republican, he also served as a city commissioner.

== Biography ==
Bacharach was born into a Jewish family in 1873 in Philadelphia, to Betty (Nusbaum) and Jacob Bacharach. His brother was United States Congressman Isaac Bacharach.

In 1914, Bacharach was tried for election fraud in the 1910 mayoral election.

He died on May 13, 1947, in Atlantic City.

== Heritage ==
The Bacharach Giants, a Negro league baseball team that played in Atlantic City, were created by his political allies and used his name as a promotional vehicle for the 1916 mayoral election.

Harry and his brother, Congressman Isaac Bacharach, founded the Betty Bacharach Home for Afflicted Children in honor of their mother, which opened in 1924. The home cared for children afflicted with infantile paralysis. The building at 2305 Atlantic Avenue, Longport, New Jersey, became the borough hall in 1990.

Mr. Bacharach was also nicknamed “Shore Gate“ after he shut down the major roads for the summer.

== In popular culture ==
Bacharach was played by actor John Rue in the HBO television series Boardwalk Empire.

Political offices
Preceded by Joseph Paxson	Mayor of Atlantic City; 1930 – 1935	Succeeded by Charles D. White
Preceded by William Riddle	Mayor of Atlantic City; 1916 – 1920	Succeeded by Edward L. Bader
Preceded by George Carmany	Mayor of Atlantic City; 1912 (6 months)	Succeeded by William Riddle
