= Franklin Pierce Stoy =

American politician

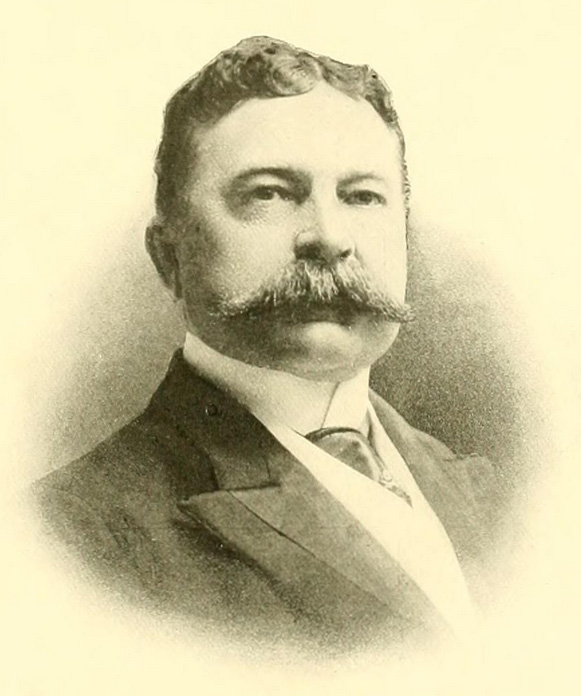

Mayor of Atlantic City, New Jersey
- In office 1900–1911
- Preceded by: Joseph Thompson
- Succeeded by: George Carmany
- In office 1894–1897
- Preceded by: Willard Wright
- Succeeded by: Joseph Thompson

Personal details
- Born: January 23, 1853 Camden County, New Jersey
- Died: July 22, 1911 (aged 58) Wernersville, Pennsylvania
- Profession: Politician

Franklin Pierce Stoy (January 23, 1853 – July 22, 1911) was the Mayor of Atlantic City, New Jersey from 1894–1897 and again from 1900 to 1911. Stoy became a Councilman at Large of the local government in 1891 and, three years later, was elected chief executive. Known as the "Dandy Mayor," he died of neuritis on July 22, 1911.
