= JoAnna LaSane =

American model and arts administrator (1935–2019)

- Born: JoAnna Emma Foreman; July 24, 1935; Atlantic City, New Jersey
- Died: January 16, 2019
- Occupations: Model, dancer, arts administrator

JoAnna LaSane (1935 – January 16, 2019), also written as Joanna Lasane, was an American model and arts administrator. She served on the New Jersey State Council of the Arts, and was director of the Atlantic City Children's Theatre. In 1996 she was inducted into the Atlantic City Women's Hall of Fame.

== Early life ==
JoAnna Emma Foreman was born in Atlantic City, New Jersey, the daughter of John Wesley Foreman and Viona Marie Foreman. Her mother, a student of Sarah Spencer Washington, ran a beauty salon. She graduated from Atlantic City High School in 1953. JoAnna Foreman studied dance and drama in New York, with Katherine Dunham, George Balanchine, and Lloyd Richards among her instructors, but her height -- 5 feet 10 inches (1.78 m)—made ballet an unlikely career.

== Career ==
LaSane performed as a dancer on Broadway, and at the New York World's Fair in 1964, and appeared as a model in the pages of Vogue, Redbook, Glamour, Ebony, and Life magazines. She also appeared in a national television advertisement for Pepsi, and was described as "the first black model to be featured in a prime-time, national television commercial." She taught dance in Atlantic City in the 1960s. Her appearance was distinctive for her short natural hairstyle. "I always liked this type hair-do and I haven't looked back since I made up my mind to let nature take its course." The style was becoming more popular, but still seldom seen in American media, when LaSane was featured on the cover of Jet magazine in 1966. "LaSane's cover Afro was a seismic event", recalled June Cross in her 2006 memoir, Secret Daughter.

LaSane created the Atlantic City Children's Theater program, encouraging children to practice public speaking and build self-confidence. She was active in arts organizations, serving on the boards of the Atlantic County Cultural and Heritage Commission, the Atlantic City Arts Commission, and the New Jersey State Council of the Arts. In 1996 she was inducted into the Atlantic City Women's Hall of Fame. She received the Pop Lloyd Humanitarian Award in 2005, for her work with young people.

== Personal life ==
JoAnna Foreman married businessman Karlos R. LaSane, who became the first black city commissioner in Atlantic City in 1968. They had a son, Karlos R. LaSane II. JoAnna LaSane died in 2019, aged 83 years. There is a historical marker about LaSane in Atlantic City.
