= Smarter Agent, Inc. =

Smarter Agent, Inc. was a research and development company, founded by Brad W. Blumberg and Eric M. Blumberg, that built early mobile location-based apps.

In 2008, Smarter Agent became an LLC and raised private equity from angel investors led by Ira Lubert. The company began offering mobile apps to the real estate industry, and grew its mobile inventions and patent portfolio. Smarter Agent raised additional equity from angel investors.

The company worked to protect its technology, arguing in a sequence of lawsuits that its IP precludes any competing service from creating an app that allows a user to search for real estate using its patented software that integrates hardware, software and location technologies. In 2011, the company filed a series of patent infringement lawsuits alleging violation of several patents held by the company, including patents 6,385,541, 6,496,776 and 7,072,665. Additional infringement actions were filed in 2019 with new patents awarded to Smarter Agent, LLC.

In 2013, Smarter Agent Mobile was spun out to focus on its growing mobile SaaS business, and Smarter Agent, LLC continued to hold the company's intellectual property (IP). In 2013, CoreLogic licensed the firm's technology for use in its offerings. Several MLSs and companies also licensed the patents.

Originally based in Camden, New Jersey as part of a business incubator, the company relocated and is headquartered in Collingswood, New Jersey. The Smarter Agent technology is used as a white-label product as the engine behind the mobile property search tools used by such real estate franchise firms as Berkshire Hathaway, Keller Williams Realty and Sotheby's International Realty, as well as 3000 local realty firms. Available to users on iOS, Android and Windows, the company's property search tool was downloaded 4 million times in 2014. Competing with Trulia and Zillow, the company's search tool benefits from the improved accuracy of having data directly from each realty company

Smarter Agent Mobile, LLC was acquired by Keller Williams Realty International in 2018. Keller Williams announced plans to stop selling apps to 3rd parties in Dec 2020, while honoring existing contracts through their terms. Smarter Agent, LLC continues to own the IP which was not sold to Keller Williams. https://patents.justia.com/assignee/smarter-agent-llc
