= Marty Small Sr. =

American politician (born 1974)

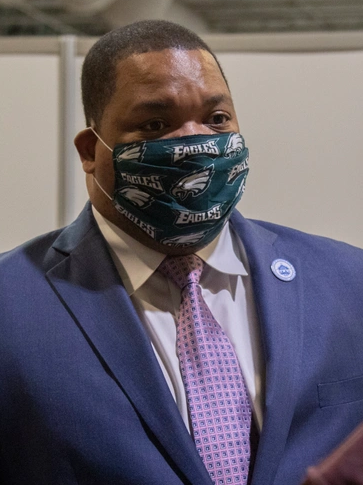
- Small in 2020

41st Mayor of Atlantic City, New Jersey
- Incumbent
- Assumed office October 4, 2019
- Preceded by: Frank Gilliam

Personal details
- Born: March 25, 1974 (age 52) Atlantic City, New Jersey, U.S.
- Party: Democratic
- Education: Stockton University

Marty Small Sr. (born March 25, 1974) is an American politician who has served as mayor of Atlantic City, New Jersey, since 2019. He was appointed by an 8–0 vote of the Atlantic City City Council after the previous mayor Frank Gilliam resigned. He was elected outright in 2020 to a partial term, and was re-elected the following year to a full term.

== Background ==
Small was first elected to the Atlantic City City Council as the 2nd Ward councilman in 2003. In 2006 Small was charged with election fraud regarding an alleged absentee ballot scheme. Again, in 2011, he was charged with election fraud concerning the 2009 Atlantic City mayoral election along with five other Democrats. He was acquitted on both charges. Small claims that the election-related arrests were politically motivated.

Small's tenure in the City Council ran from January 1, 2004, to October 3, 2019, when the acting mayor Frank Gilliam resigned, making Small the mayor of the city.

In 2017, Small narrowly lost to Frank Gilliam in the Democratic primary for Atlantic City mayor.

Following the resignation of previous Atlantic City mayor Frank Gilliam, the city council voted to appoint Small as mayor. He served for an unexpired term through December 31, 2020, pending a special election in November 2020. In November 2020, he was re-elected for an additional one-year term and in November 2021, he won his first four-year term as mayor.

On December 18, 2025, after two days of jury deliberation, Small was acquitted of all charges that he abused his teenage daughter. During the trial, his daughter testified that "He said some words and put his hands on me," and that he "was punching me in my legs and he hit me with a belt." Small's wife is set to go to trial in January 2026 on related charges stemming from the same allegations. This is the third trial, and third acquittal, of Small.

== Personal life ==
Small attended Atlantic City High School, where he played basketball. He received a Bachelor of Arts in communications from Stockton University in New Jersey.

He and his wife La'Quetta Small, superintendent of the Atlantic City School District, have two children.

On April 15, 2024, Small was charged with second-degree endangering the welfare of a child, third-degree terroristic threats, third-degree aggravated assault and disorderly persons simple assault. The alleged victim is Small's teenage daughter.

On September 17, 2024, Small was indicted on second-degree endangering the welfare of a child, third-degree charges of terroristic threats, and aggravated assault.

On December 18, 2025, Small was acquitted on all charges. In 2026, Small sued the prosecutor in the case, alleging that he knew the allegations were false, and proceeded with the charges seeking national attention.
