= Frank Gilliam (politician) =

American politician (born 1970)

40th Mayor of Atlantic City
- In office January 1, 2018 – October 3, 2019
- Preceded by: Don Guardian
- Succeeded by: Marty Small Sr.

Personal details
- Born: May 7, 1970 (age 56) Atlantic City, New Jersey, U.S.
- Party: Democratic

Frank M. Gilliam, Jr. (born May 7, 1970) is an American politician who served as the mayor of Atlantic City from 2018 to 2019. He defeated Republican incumbent Don Guardian in the 2017 election and became Atlantic City's third African American mayor.

Gilliam was born and raised in Atlantic City and attended Stockton University, where he obtained a BA in criminal justice. He continued his education at the University of San Francisco, obtaining a master's degree in social work, although this is disputed. He was elected councilman-at-large for the City of Atlantic City in 2008. While a member of city council, he sponsored, and succeeded in having adopted, an ordinance that imposes a fine for helium balloons released outdoors in Atlantic City due to the hazard they pose to marine life. In response PETA, People for the Ethical Treatment of Animals, recognized Atlantic City with their Compassionate City Award.

On November 10, 2018, Mayor Gilliam and Atlantic City Councilman Jeffree Fauntleroy II were involved in a physical altercation outside the Golden Nugget's Haven Nightclub. Surveillance video captured the mayor exchanging punches with a man, while the councilman wrestled another person to the ground. Democrats wanted the Atlantic City mayor and councilman out of office without pay. On November 28, 2018, Cape May County Prosecutor Jeffrey H. Sutherland announced that he would not be filing charges in the incident. On February 28, 2019, a municipal court dismissed assault and harassment charges filed against Gilliam by two individuals involved in the altercation.

In 1997, an Atlantic City woman sought a restraining order against Gilliam when the two were dating in college. The document stated the court found “good cause to believe that (Williams’) life, health, and well-being have been and are endangered by (Gilliam's) acts of violence.”

On December 29, 2010, then Councilman-at-Large Gilliam allegedly assaulted a man for walking too close to his car.

On December 3, 2018, Federal Bureau of Investigation and Internal Revenue Service agents raided Gilliam's home, removing computer equipment and boxes. On October 3, 2019, Gilliam pleaded guilty to wire fraud after stealing $86,000 from a youth basketball team he founded, the Atlantic City Starz. He resigned as mayor that afternoon, effective immediately, and was succeeded the following day by Council President Marty Small Sr.
