= Mayors of Atlantic City, New Jersey =

Mayor of Atlantic City, New Jersey
- Seal of Atlantic City

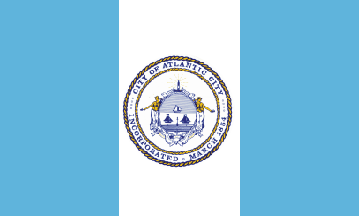
- Flag of Atlantic City

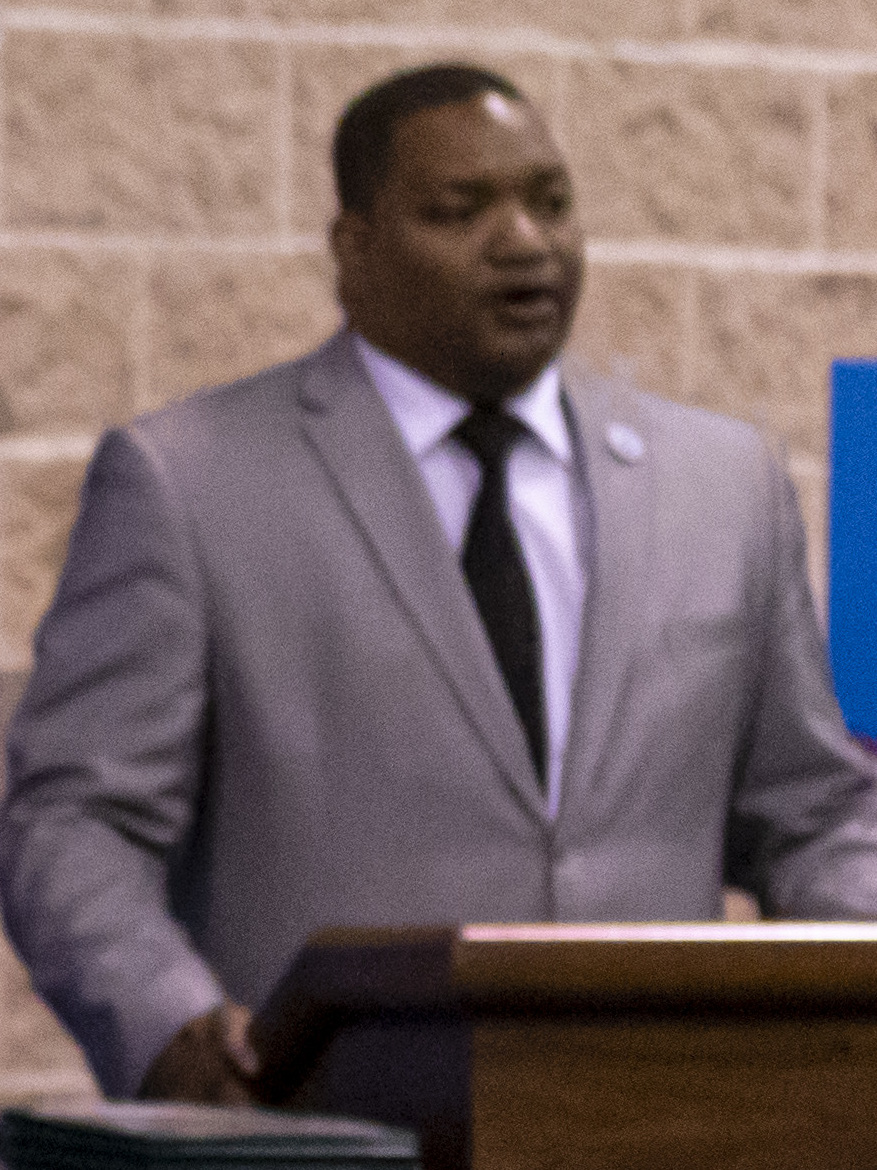
- Incumbent; Marty Small Sr. since October 4, 2019
- Government of Atlantic City, New Jersey
- Seat: Atlantic City Hall
- Term length: Four years
- Formation: May 1, 1854; 172 years ago
- Salary: $103,000 (2016)
- Website: www.acnj.gov

Atlantic City, New Jersey, was incorporated on May 1, 1854. It is governed within the Faulkner Act (formally known as the Optional Municipal Charter Law) under the mayor–council system of municipal government (Plan D), implemented by direct petition effective as of July 1, 1982. The Atlantic City City Council is the governing body of Atlantic City. There are nine Council members, who are elected to serve for a term of four years, one from each of six wards and three serving at-large. The City Council exercises the legislative power of the municipality for the purpose of holding Council meetings to introduce ordinances and resolutions to regulate City government. In addition, Council members review budgets submitted by the Mayor; provide for an annual audit of the city's accounts and financial transactions; organize standing committees and hold public hearings to address important issues which impact Atlantic City. Former Mayor Bob Levy created the Atlantic City Ethics Board in 2007, but the Board was dissolved two years later by vote of the Atlantic City Council. Since its incorporation in 1854, the town has had 41 mayors.

== Mayors ==
#	Mayor	Image	Term start	Term end	Terms	Party	Notes
1		Chalkley Steelman Leeds	May 1, 1854	1856	2	None	This was his first term.
2		Richard Hackett	1856	1856	1/2	None	
3		John George Washington Avery	1856	1857	1	None	
4		Lewis Reed	1857	1861	4	None	
5		James Harper	1861	1862	1	None	
(1)		Chalkley Steelman Leeds	1862	1863	1	None	This was his second term.
6		Jacob Middleton	1863	1865	2	None	
7		Robert T. Evard	1865	1866	1	Republican	
8		David W. Belisle	1866	1868	2	Republican	
9		Lemuel G. Eldridge	1868	1868	Partial	Republican	
10		John James Gardner	1868	1872	4	Republican	
11		Charles Souder	1872	1874	2	Republican	
(10)		John James Gardner	1874	1876	2	Republican	
12		Willard Wright	1876	1878	2	Democratic	
13		John L. Bryant	1878	1879	1	Republican	
(12)		Willard Wright	1879	1880	1	Democratic	
14		Harry L. Slape	1880	1881	1	Republican	
(12)		Willard Wright	1881	1882	1	Democratic	
15		Charles Maxwell	1882	1885	3	Republican	
16		Thomas C. Garrett	1885	1887	2	Republican	
17		Samuel D. Hoffman	1887	1891	4	Republican	
(12)		Willard Wright	1891	1894	3	Democratic	
18		Franklin Pierce Stoy	1894	1897	3	Republican	(January 23, 1853 – July 22, 1911). He became a Councilman at Large of the local government in 1891 and, three years later, was elected chief executive. Known as the "Dandy Mayor,". He died in office in his second term of neuritis on July 22, 1911.
19		Joseph Thompson	1897	1900	3	Democratic	
(18)		Franklin Pierce Stoy †	1900	1911	3	Republican	He became a Councilman at Large of the local government in 1891 and, three years later, was elected chief executive. Known as the "Dandy Mayor,". He died in office in his second term of neuritis on July 22, 1911.
20		George Carmany	1911	1912	Partial	Republican	
21		Harry Bacharach	1912	1912	1	Republican	
22		William Riddle	1912	1916	1	Democratic	
(21)		Harry Bacharach	1916	1920	1	Republican	
23		Edward Lawrence Bader †	1920	1927	2	Republican	He died in office.
24		Anthony Ruffu, Jr.	1927	1930	1	Republican	
25		Joseph A. Paxson	1930	1930	Partial	Republican	
(21)		Harry Bacharach	1930	1935	1	Republican	
26		Charles D. White	1935	1940	1	Republican	
27		Thomas D. Taggart, Jr.	1940	1944	1	Democratic	
28		Joseph Altman †	1944	1967	6	Republican	He died in office. He served for 23 years. Joseph Altman is the longest-serving mayor of Atlantic City, New Jersey.
29		Richard S. Jackson	1967	1969	Partial	Republican	
30		William Thomas Somers	1969	1972	1	Democratic	
31		Joseph Bradway Jr.	1972	1976	1	Republican	
32		Joseph Lazarow	1976	1982	1 1/2	Republican	
33		Michael J. Matthews	1982	1984	1/2	Democratic	
34		James Leroy Usry	1984	1990	1 1/2	Republican	First African-American Mayor
35		Jim Whelan	1990	2002	3	Democratic	
36		Lorenzo Langford	2002	2005	1	Democratic	
37		Robert Levy	2006	2007	Partial	Democratic	
38		Scott Evans	2007	2008	Partial	Democratic	
(36)		Lorenzo Langford	2008	2013	1 1/2	Democratic	
39		Don Guardian	2014	2017	1	Republican	
40		Frank Gilliam	2018	2019	Partial	Democratic	Gilliam resigned as mayor on October 3, 2019, following pleading guilty to wire fraud earlier that day in Federal Court
41		Marty Small Sr.	2019	Present	1 1/2	Democratic	Served as Acting Mayor for an unexpired term ending on December 31, 2020. Reelected.
