= The First Time (2012 film) =

2012 American film directed by Jon Kasdan

- Theatrical release poster
- Directed by: Jonathan Kasdan
- Written by: Jonathan Kasdan
- Produced by: Martin Shafer; Liz Glotzer
- Starring: Britt Robertson; Dylan O'Brien; Craig Roberts; Joshua Malina; James Frecheville; Christine Taylor; Victoria Justice
- Cinematography: Rhet Bear
- Edited by: Hugh Ross
- Music by: Alec Puro
- Production company: Jerimaca Films
- Distributed by: Samuel Goldwyn Films; Destination Films
- Release dates: January 21, 2012 (Sundance); October 19, 2012 (United States)
- Running time: 95 minutes
- Country: United States
- Language: English
- Box office: $92,654

The First Time is a 2012 American teen romantic comedy film written and directed by Jonathan Kasdan, starring Britt Robertson, Dylan O'Brien, James Frecheville, and Victoria Justice.

Dave Hodgman (O'Brien) is a high school senior who spends most of his time pining away over his best friend, Jane Harmon (Justice), a girl he cannot have. Aubrey Miller (Robertson), a junior at a different high school, has an older boyfriend, Ronny (Frecheville) who does not quite understand her or seem to care. A casual conversation between Dave and Aubrey sparks an instant connection, and, over the course of a weekend, things turn magical, romantic, complicated, and funny as Aubrey and Dave discover what it is like to fall in love for the first time.

== Plot ==
High school senior, Dave, meets junior, Aubrey, outside a house party, while rehearsing a confession of love for his best friend, Jane. The police bust the party, and Aubrey asks Dave to walk her home despite having a boyfriend. She invites him to her room, and they have wine and talk. Aubrey asks him if he is still a virgin, and he admits he is. However, she refuses to answer the same question. Then they accidentally fall asleep. The next morning, Aubrey's mother's knock wakes them, so Dave sneaks out the window. Dave meets with his friends, Simon and Big Corporation, for breakfast, and they believe Aubrey may have lied about having a boyfriend. That night Dave, Jane, and their friends go to the movies. Aubrey also unexpectedly shows up with her boyfriend, Ronny. During the movie, Aubrey gets jealous at how close Dave and Jane are getting and leaves the theater, and Dave follows her. Dave gets her cell number and invites her and Ronny to a gathering afterwards.

Later, Aubrey and Jane talk about Dave. She sees Jane has high praise for him, but does not appreciate him. Meanwhile, a drunk Ronny brags that he and Aubrey are planning to have sex that night. Dave finds Aubrey and tells her not to do it as her first time should be with someone special. She opposes the romantic notion of the first time being so important and says it is none of his business. Ronny finds them and tells Aubrey they need to go. Dave intercedes, nearly fighting before his buddies intervene. Aubrey leaves with Ronny. At the end of the party, Dave is in a bedroom with Jane, and he realizes he would rather be with Aubrey and leaves. He gets a text from Aubrey asking him to pick her up, he obliges. As Dave and Aubrey cruise, she tells him she broke up with Ronny, and they hold hands. They then pass the aftermath of a car accident, teens who had offered them a ride right the previous night. Upsetting Aubrey, Dave pulls over. They realize their mutual feelings and kiss.

They meet at a park with Dave's little sister Stella the next day. Aubrey's parents are out for the night, so she invites Dave over. He contemplates bringing a condom, but decides against it. As they make out, they hesitate before deciding to have sex. Dave awkwardly puts on a condom Aubrey has. Afterwards, both are upset as it felt unsatisfying, and feel awkward talking about it. Everything they say makes it worse, so they agree it was a mistake and should not see each other. However, they both regret it; Aubrey keeps hoping Dave will call, while he repeatedly starts to, but hangs up.

Meeting with Simon and Big Corporation, he tells them the idea of sex was better than the reality. Big Corporation tells him he and Aubrey just hit a speed bump because it was their first time, but they should try again. The following morning, Aubrey tells her parents she regrets pushing Dave away, and they try to soothe her. When she walks outside, Dave is waiting for her in the driveway. He declares his feelings and wants to try again. She acts uninterested, but asks for a ride to school. In the car, she agrees they should try again and work on the sex, and he is relieved. As he drops her off, they say goodbye awkwardly, but she runs back, breaking her no PDA rule with a warm, passionate kiss.

== Cast ==
- Britt Robertson as Aubrey Miller
- Dylan O'Brien as Dave Hodgman
- Craig Roberts as Simon Daldry
- Joshua Malina as Mr. Miller
- James Frecheville as Ronny
- LaMarcus Tinker as Big Corporation
- Maggie Elizabeth Jones as Stella Hodgman
- Christine Taylor as Mrs. Miller
- Victoria Justice as Jane Harmon
- Halston Sage as Brianna
- Molly Quinn as Erica

== Music ==
The First Time Unofficial Soundtrack
No.	Title	Writer(s)	Artist	Length
1.	"Silly Boy"	Soeren Christiansen, Steffen Westmark, Allan Villadsen, Per Joergensen	The Blue Van	3:19
2.	"Teenage Daydream"	Robin Feher	The Nights	3:57
3.	"We're #1"	Andrew Creighton	The World Record	3:54
4.	"Mama"	Trey Johnson	Sorta
5.	"Lonely Soul"	Robin Feher	The Nights	3:56
6.	"Oh My Love"	Daniel Varjo, Ludvig Rylander, Lisa Milberg, Maria Eriksson, Martin Hansson, Per Nystrom, Ullik Jonusson, Dante Holgersson	The Concretes	2:54
7.	"Out of Touch"	Elizabeth Borden	Liz Borden and The Axes	2:32
8.	"If It Be Your Will"	Leonard Cohen	Leonard Cohen	3:42
9.	"Trouble"	Matthew Beighley, Thomas King, Jacqueline Santillan	Wait. Think. Fast.	4:12
10.	"The End"	Bethany Cosentino	Best Coast	2:42
11.	"Head Spin"	Dane Schmidt	Jamestown Story	3:13
12.	"Diamond Eyes"	Michael Haggins	Michael Haggins	18:02
13.	"I Cannot Love You"	Michael Lerner	Telekinesis	2:01
14.	"Can't Stop Thinking"	Tom Wolfe	Buva	4:11
15.	"Come On"	Chad Marshman	The Wind	4:39
16.	"In Your Mind"	Matt Weinberger, Abe Seiferth, Jared Elioseff, John Graham Davis, David Burnett	Phonograph	4:30
17.	"Come and Go (feat. KU)"	Danica Rozelle, Jacques Slade, Lamar Van Sciver, Frank Greenfield	Danica Rozelle	4:06
18.	"Anne With an E"	Kip Berman, Peggy Wang, Kurt Feldman, Alex Naidus	The Pains of Being Pure at Heart	4:06
19.	"Wait For Me"	Daniel Blue, Josiah Sherman	Motopony	4:57
20.	"Vampire's Kiss"	John Gold	John Gold	3:41
21.	"Coming Home"	Pete Kilpatrick, Zach Jones	Pete Kilpatrick Band	3:38
22.	"Till The Morning"	Afie Jurvanen	Bahamas	1:58
23.	"Girls Like You"	Thomas Powers, Aaron Short, Alisa Xayalith	The Naked and Famous	6:04
24.	"Sweet Louise"	Bobby Gruska, Ethan Gruska	The Belle Brigade	3:06

== Reception ==
Review aggregator Rotten Tomatoes gives the film a 47% rating based on 19 reviews and an average rating of 5.62/10. Metacritic gives the film a score of 55 out of 100, based on 10 critics, indicating "mixed or average reviews". Among the negative reviews, Mark Olsen of the Los Angeles Times wrote, "There is much to like here, a sense of nuance and non-judgmental emotional openness, yet Kasdan's teenage miniaturism never quite blooms," whilst Joshua Rothkopf of Time Out New York said, "Writer-director Jonathan Kasdan can't even bother to satisfy the buildup with a real moment of consummation (welcome to the fade to black) or believable postcoital complications." Todd McCarthy of The Hollywood Reporter was similarly unimpressed, remarking, "Despite intermittent laughs and charm, The First Time feels slight and pretty ordinary by the end, with no edge or compelling insights".

However, New York Times critic Neil Genzlinger wrote a positive review, stating, "The list of temptations a filmmaker can fall into when making a movie about high school students and virginity is quite long, but Jonathan Kasdan avoids most of them in his sweet, low-key comedy “The First Time.” No gratuitous raunchiness here and only a few tired caricatures in a genre usually jammed with them." And Daniel Fienberg of HitFix enthused, "The First Time doesn't look or feel like a Sundance competition entry, but if you overlook it due to that television pedigree, you'll miss out on an effectively sweet, frequently clever offering buoyed by an attractive group of stars".

== Release ==
The First Time received a limited release in the United States on October 19, 2012, grossing $22,836 domestically and $92,654 worldwide. It was released on DVD and digital download on March 12, 2013.
