= Bader Field =

Former airfield in Atlantic City, New Jersey, United States (1919–2006)

Atlantic City Municipal Airport Bader Field
- View of Atlantic City skyline from Bader Field, September 2004

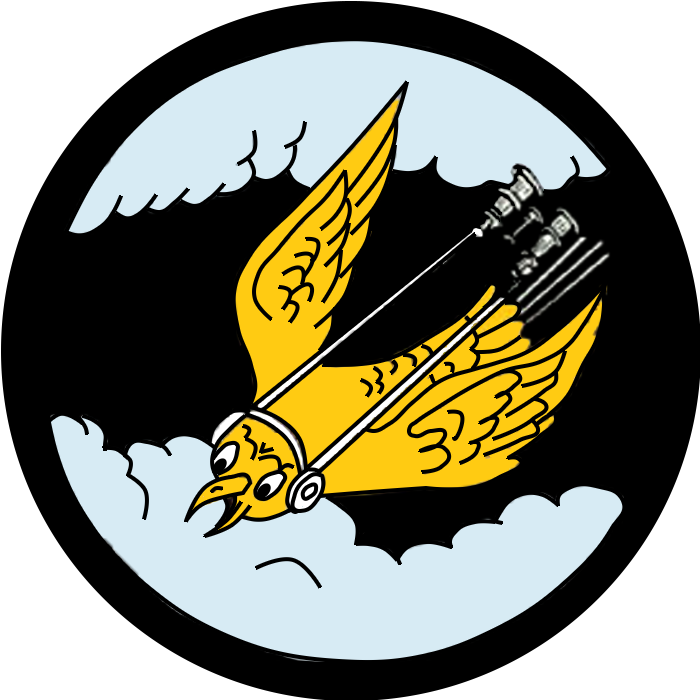
- Emblem used by the Civil Air Patrol First Task Force (1942 - 1943)
- IATA: AIY; ICAO: KAIY; FAA LID: AIY

Summary
- Airport type: Defunct
- Owner: City of Atlantic City
- Serves: Atlantic City, New Jersey
- Opened: May 1, 1919
- Closed: September 30, 2006
- Occupants: Civil Air Patrol First Task Force (1942 - 1943)
- Elevation AMSL: 8 ft / 2.4 m
- Coordinates: 39°21′36″N 074°27′22″W

Map
- Interactive map of Atlantic City Municipal Airport; Bader Field

Runways
Direction	Length		Surface
Direction	ft	m	Surface
04/22	~~2,595~~	~~791~~	Asphalt (Closed)
11/29	~~2,948~~	~~899~~	Asphalt (Closed)

Statistics (2001)
- Aircraft operations: 10,683
- Source: Federal Aviation Administration

Bader Field (IATA: AIY, ICAO: KAIY, FAA LID: AIY), also known as Atlantic City Municipal Airport, was a city-owned public-use general aviation airport located in Atlantic City, in Atlantic County, New Jersey, United States. It was named after the former mayor of Atlantic City, Edward L. Bader. The airport-turned field is located in Chelsea Heights, Atlantic City.

Bader Field permanently closed on September 30, 2006. The field as of 2016 was for sale.

Located less than a mile across the Intracoastal Waterway from the landmark original Convention Hall, it was Atlantic City's principal airport during the city's Miss America golden age. Its decline began in 1958 when the former Naval air station was converted to joint civilian/military use as Atlantic City International Airport. It is about 9 miles further inland. Private planes had continued to use the airport until 2006. The airport land, which has a scenic view of Atlantic City's Boardwalk casinos has long been considered prime real estate for luxury usage or casino, but efforts to develop it have so far not succeeded.

== History ==
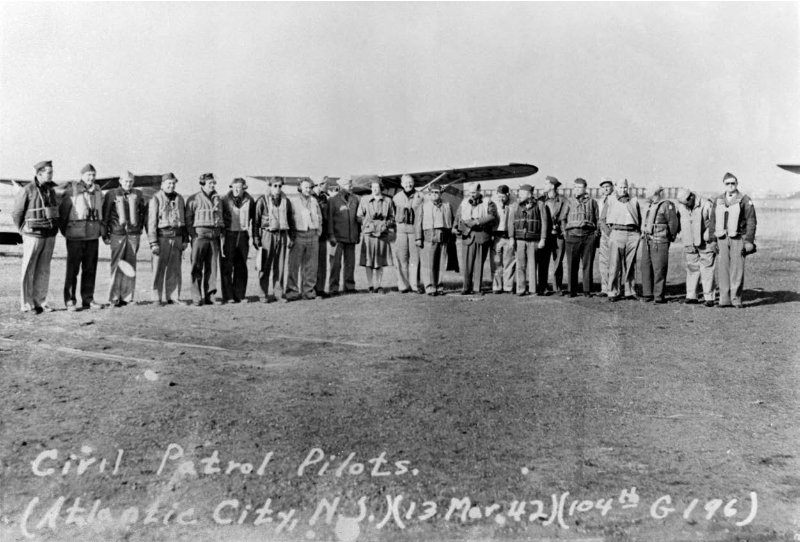
Members of the Civil Air Patrol First Task Force, 13 March 1942, sporting an array of life vests and uniform variations.

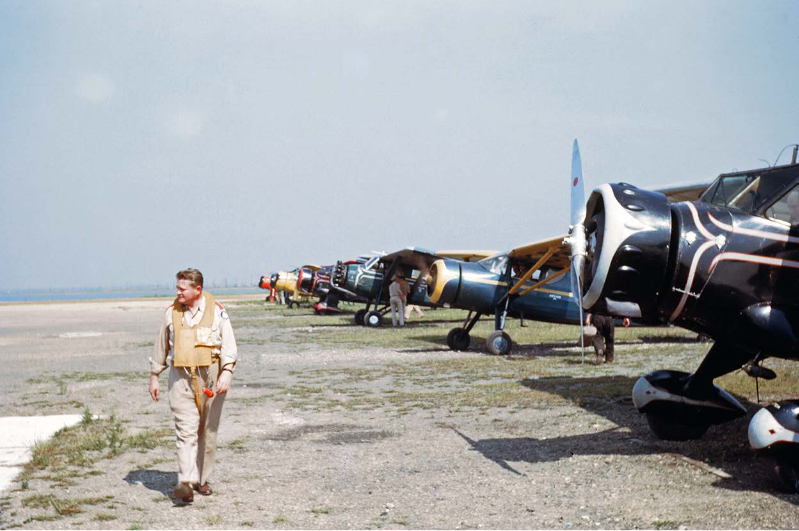
Flight line at Bader Field, showcasing a variety of civilian air frames in use by the First Task Force.

Much like Kitty Hawk, North Carolina, Atlantic City offered a long beach and strong winds with which early aviators could test their aircraft. In March of 1910, several local businessmen formed the Aero Club of Atlantic City to encourage pilots and manufacturers to use the city as a proving ground. At a meet the club held the following July, aviation pioneer Glenn H. Curtiss became the first pilot to fly an airplane over the ocean. Taking off from the beach near the Million Dollar Pier, Curtiss flew his Albany Flier biplane 10 laps over a 5-mile course to win a $5,000 prize. At the same meet, Walter Brookins, flying a Wright biplane, set an altitude record of 6,175 feet. Other pilots continued to use the city’s beach as a runway, and Curtiss built a hangar for his company’s biplanes on the beach facing the inlet (roughly where Caspian and North Maine Avenues intersect today).

The first Pan-American Aeronautic Exposition was held at the Grand Central Palace in New York in 1917. As it was entirely indoors, the exposition was essentially a trade show. To secure the second exposition for Atlantic City, the Aero Club proposed the construction of an airfield where planes could take off, land, and be stored during the event. In collaboration with the Aero Club of America and the Aerial League of America, the Atlantic City club acquired 160 acres in the city’s Chelsea Heights, neighborhood and oversaw the construction of two dirt runways and a hangar.

The Atlantic City Municipal Airport opened for service on May 1, 1919, marking the start of the second Pan-American Aeronautic Exposition. The first plane to land at the airport was a Curtiss Oriole piloted by Roland Rohlfs and carrying Cuban diplomat Victor Hugo Barranco as a passenger.

Two months after the exposition, the Aero Club of Atlantic City sold the airport to Curtiss. In 1921, the city ordered Curtiss to close his flying station on the beach.

The city purchased the airport outright in 1922. In 1927, the airport was renamed Bader Field in honor of Mayor Edward L. Bader, who had died that January. In October of 1927, Charles Lindbergh landed his Spirit of St. Louis at Bader Field for the 90th of 92 stops on his tour in support of the Daniel Guggenheim Fund for the Promotion of Aeronautics.

In July 1933, pilot C. Alfred "Chief" Anderson and Atlantic City physician Albert Ernest Forsythe became the first black men to make a round-trip transcontinental flight in the United States. On July 17, the pair took off from Bader Field in Forsythe's Fairchild 24, named the Pride of Atlantic City, which had no parachutes, radio, or landing lights. Two days later they touched down at Grand Central Airport in Glendale, California, where they were greeted by aviator William J. Powell. After two days of being feted at several receptions in Los Angeles, including by Mayor Frank L. Shaw, Anderson and Forsythe took off from Glendale on July 21 and landed at Bader Field on July 28, where Atlantic City Mayor Harry Bacharach proclaimed, "Flying in a small plane, with the limited equipment that you men used, called for a high type of courage and skill. The citizens of Atlantic City are indeed very proud of you.""

Bader Field is a historically significant location of the Civil Air Patrol (CAP). It was home to Civil Air Patrol Coastal Patrol Base No. 1, activated on February 28, 1942 alongside Coastal Patrol Base No. 2 at Rehoboth Beach, Delaware. Civil Air Patrol began their coastal patrol operations out of Bader Field by March 10, 1942. It was the first of what would be 21 CAP coastal patrol bases that operated from 1942-1943. By April 28, 1943, there were a total of 34 CAP aircraft operating out of the base.

== Historical airline service ==
Commercial airline service for Atlantic City was first provided by All American Airways beginning in 1949. All American was changed to Allegheny Airlines in 1953 and service continued until all flights were moved to the Atlantic City International Airport by 1959. Allegheney returned in 1971 with Allegheny Commuter service operated by Atlantic City Airlines using de Havilland Canada DHC-6 Twin Otter aircraft on routes from Bader Field to Newark, Philadelphia, and Cape May, NJ. Atlantic City Airlines was later changed to Southern Jersey Airways and Allegheny Airlines was changed to USAir in 1979. By 1983 service was added to New York and Washington D.C. as well as the introduction of a much larger aircraft, the de Havilland Canada Dash-7. Southern Jersey Airways ended their affiliation with USAir in 1988 and new code-share alliances were added with both Continental Airlines and Eastern Airlines. Southern Jersey ended all operations soon after in 1990.

Other commuter airlines also served Bader Field in the 1980s including Jet Express, operating as Trans World Express on behalf of Trans World Airlines using CASA C-212 Aviocar aircraft on flights to New York -JFK- Airport. Service was also flown to the Republic Airport in East Farmingdale, NY. These services were brief, only operating from February through September, 1989 before moving to the Atlantic City International Airport. Casinos began using Bader Field for charter flights and a helicopter service was operated to the West 30th Street Heliport in Manhattan. All commercial service to Bader Field ended by 1991 at which time all air carriers were serving the Atlantic City International Airport/Pomona Field.

The control tower was removed in the late 1990s and some of the former airport property was used to build a minor-league baseball stadium, Surf Stadium.

=== Non-aviation uses ===
In 1920, actor and producer Jimmy Callahan built a film studio at the airport in a hangar he leased from Curtiss.

== Accidents and incidents ==
On May 15, 2005, the Cessna CitationJet 525A registered OY-JET overran the runway when attempting a 10 knots tailwind landing, ending up in the adjoining Intracoastal Waterway. An eyewitness video captured the accident from the final approach to the rescue of the plane's occupants by local boaters and the subsequent inadvertent operation of the aircraft as an "airboat". The NTSB report of the accident noted, "...the airport diagram...observed attached to the pilot's control column after the accident...read, 'airport closed to jet aircraft'".

== Redevelopment and later uses ==
Bader Field is considered a prime redevelopment site. In 1998, Bernie Robbins Stadium, a 5,500-seat baseball stadium, opened on the site, housing the Atlantic City Surf minor league baseball team until it discontinued operations in 2009. An indoor ice skating rink, Flyers Skate Zone, also opened up at the Bader Field site.

The South Jersey Region of the Sports Car Club of America hosts autocross events at Bader Field during the non-winter months. The SJR SCCA has been using the site for a few years to date.

In March 2011, the Dave Matthews Band announced that Bader Field would be the first of four sites for the Dave Matthews Band Caravan, a three-day music festival featuring an eclectic group of musical acts, with the Dave Matthews Band being the headlining performer for each night. The Atlantic City event was to take place June 24–26, 2011. In announcing the location of the event, the Dave Matthews Band cited Bader Field's proximity to several major metropolitan areas in the northeastern seaboard and its accessibility via several modes of public transportation. Improvements to the site prior to the event included burning overgrown brush as well as improvements to the long-neglected Bernie Robbins Stadium, which would house VIP seating for special ticket holders as well as host a later music festival featuring rapper Rick Ross. Improvements would also make way for other events, such as motorsports events on the runway strips.

In April 2011, Bader Field was included in the new state-run Tourism District controlled by the Casino Reinvestment Development Authority. The site's large parcel and potential for redevelopment led to its inclusion, which received much scrutiny from mayor Lorenzo Langford, who cast the lone "no" vote on the formation of the district, citing the inclusion of Bader Field as his reasoning.

In February 2012, Metallica announced that their two-day Orion Music + More Festival would be staged at Bader Field on June 23 and 24, 2012.

The popular jam band Phish performed a three-day run at Bader Field, June 15–17, 2012.

Bader Field was scheduled to host a round of the Global Rallycross Championship in 2016.

== Facilities and aircraft ==
Bader Field covered an area of 143 acres (58 ha) at an elevation of 8 feet (2.4 m) above mean sea level. It had two asphalt paved runways: 4/22 measured 2,595 by 100 feet (791 × 30 m) and 11/29 measured 2,948 by 100 feet (899 × 30 m). For the 12-month period ending January 4, 2001, the airport had 10,683 aircraft operations, an average of 29 per day: 81% general aviation and 19% air taxi.

== See also ==
- Bader Field (ballpark)
- Atlantic City International Airport
