= VOC BioTreat =

VOC BioTreat™ is a U.S. patent pending technology for Ramboll Environ.

This technology allows for the removal and chemical degradation of volatile organic compounds (VOCs) by piping them into a deep-tank aerated activated sludge wastewater treatment plant, which meets U.S. Environmental Protection Agency (EPA) standards for VOC and hazardous air pollutant removal and can be used for existing pollution remediation infrastructure at refineries, chemical companies, pharmaceutical manufacturers and others.

== EPA goals ==
The EPA regulates VOCs mainly because of their ability to create photochemical smog and regards reducing the concentration of VOC as an important to health and environmental goal.

== Technological approach ==
VOC BioTreat pipes biodegradable airborne VOCs into the biotreatment plant treating waterborne VOCs. This eliminates the need for a separate approach to address airborne emissions by using activated carbon filters and burning the resulting waste.

The work in developing the protocols and resulting solutions on VOC BioTreat was led by Dr. Carl Adams, Ramboll Environ's Global Practice Leader for Industrial Waste Management. Adams holds three patents involving advanced industrial wastewater treatment technology. He has worked with over 90 refineries in North America and around the world. He is recognized by the EPA as an expert in the development of cost-effective volatile organic compounds (VOC) control technologies, especially for refineries and petrochemical plants.

== Awards and honors ==
Following the use of VOC BioTreat at the Marathon Petroleum Company’s refinery in Garyville, Louisiana, ENVIRON, whose operations preceded Ramboll Environ, received the 2011 Grand Prize in Research from the American Academy of Environmental Engineers and Scientists. The Academy said, “Refineries and chemical industries with a current activated sludge system that meet certain criteria would be strong candidates for ENVIRON’s new VOC BioTreat approach,” while also noting that the technology “greatly reduces capital investment” and “long-term operational costs.”

In September 2011, VOC BioTreat was a semi-finalist for the Kirkpatrick Chemical Engineering Achievement Award. Chemical Engineering Magazine has awarded this biennial prize, continuously since 1933.
