= American College of Toxicology =

- Formation: 1977
- Location: United States
- Official language: English
- President: Patricia Ryan
- Website: https://www.actox.org

The American College of Toxicology (ACT) is a professional association that provides a forum for the exchange of scientific information in the field of applied toxicology and safety assessment. As of 2024, ACT's membership comprised more than 1,000 toxicologists who work in industry, government regulatory agencies, academia, or as independent consultants.

== History ==
Founded in 1977, ACT was established to provide a forum for scientists in the field of toxicology to exchange information between regulators, industry, and academia. In 1979, the ACT held its first Annual Meeting. In 1981, it hosted its first workshop on the topic of reproductive toxicology. In 2004, ACT's first course, Pathology for Nonpathologists, was co-hosted with the Society for Toxicological Pathology (STP). In 2014, ACT started offering the Advanced Comprehensive Toxicology course, which provides Board-certification hopefuls with a comprehensive series of lessons to help prepare for the American Board of Toxicology exam. The College was also one of the first societies to offer Continuing Education courses and established the triennial Salary Survey.

== Activities ==
The College's flagship event is the November Annual Meeting. During the remainder of the year, the College produces podcasts, streams, webinars, and offers training courses in basic, advanced, and specialty toxicology, which are released throughout the year. Besides the Pathology for Nonpathologists and Advanced Comprehensive Courses mentioned above, other notable in-person courses or workshops, which are held live, include Study Director Training, Toxicology for Pharmaceutical and Regulatory Scientists, and Biologics Nonclinical Drug Development courses.

== International Journal of Toxicology ==
The International Journal of Toxicology (IJT) is the official publication of ACT. It is published six times a year.
