= Dave Matthews Band Caravan =

2011 series of concert festivals

Dave Matthews Band
- Also known as: DMBC
- Years active: 2011
- Members: Dave Matthews Band
- Website: www.dmbcaravan.com

Dave Matthews Band Caravan was a series of concert festivals headed by the Dave Matthews Band (DMB). The four festivals, occurring during the summer of 2011, took the place of DMB's usual summer tour, after the band announced its intentions to take time off from touring the previous year. The first festival took place at Bader Field in Atlantic City, New Jersey. The second festival was at Chicago's Lakeside. The third stop of the DMB Caravan took place at Governors Island in New York, New York, but was rescheduled after Hurricane Irene hit the New York area the same weekend. On September 1, it was announced that the dates were rescheduled, while the venue changed to Randall's Island. The last stop was The Gorge in Washington. Each festival was three days long, with each show featuring a full set from the Dave Matthews Band. Various other acts performed on different stages prior to DMB's set.

At these shows, DMB performed covers including Led Zeppelin's "Good Times Bad Times" and Aerosmith's "Sweet Emotion". The band also played older songs from their catalog, including Kill The King, Shotgun, Joy Ride, and The Best Of What's Around. At the Atlantic City and Chicago festivals, the set lists were structured to progress across each of the three-night events.

== Bader Field ==
On March 9, 2011, Dave Matthews Band Caravan announced that its first performance would take place at Bader Field in Atlantic City, New Jersey on June 24–26. The lineup of performers was soon announced after, along with ticket information, lodging, and transportation suggestions.

=== Lineup ===
- Dave Matthews Band
- David Gray
- Ray Lamontagne
- The Flaming Lips
- O.A.R.
- Damian Marley
- Bassnectar
- Dr. Dog
- Amos Lee
- Thievery Corporation
- Michael Franti & Spearhead
- Warren Haynes Band
- Grace Potter and the Nocturnals
- Guster
- Lotus
- Rebelution
- Fitz and the Tantrums
- Carolina Chocolate Drops
- Lisa Hannigan
- Punch Brothers
- From Good Homes
- Delta Spirit
- Big Gigantic
- Alberta Cross
- Mariachi El Bronx
- TR3
- Vusi Mahlasela
- The Budos Band
- Bobby Long
- Dawes
- Pete Kilpatrick Band

Acoustic duo Dave Matthews & Tim Reynolds also performed a set during the Caravan. Carter Beauford and Stefan Lessard also sat in with some of the performers during their sets. Dave Matthews Band headlined all 3 shows with a full set.

== Lakeside, Chicago ==
On April 7, 2011, Dave Matthews Band Caravan announced its second stop out of four on the tour. It was hosted in Chicago July 8–10, 2011. This is the first event to ever be held at the site of a since-demolished steel mill known as the South Works, referred to by the Caravan as Lakeside.

=== Lineup ===
- Dave Matthews Band
- David Gray
- Umphrey's McGee
- Ray Lamontagne
- The Flaming Lips
- O.A.R.
- Edward Sharpe and the Magnetic Zeros
- Emmylou Harris
- Kid Cudi
- Amos Lee
- Summer Camp
- Liz Phair
- Ben Folds
- G. Love & Special Sauce
- Sharon Jones & The Dap-Kings
- Gomez
- Drive-By Truckers
- Daniel Lanois' Black Dub
- The Jayhawks
- Michael Franti & Spearhead
- SOJA
- Soulive
- The Wailers
- Blind Pilot
- Dirty Dozen Brass Band
- Alberta Cross
- Mariachi El Bronx
- TR3
- Vieux Farka Toure
- The Budos Band
- Jeff Coffin Mu'tet
- Ivan Neville's Dumpstaphunk
- Gary Clark, Jr.

== Governors Island ==
DMB Caravan announced on April 21, 2011, that the third festival will be held at Governors Island in New York, New York. The concerts will be held August 26–28, and will feature various artists.

=== Lineup ===
- Dave Matthews Band
- Dispatch
- The Roots
- Gogol Bordello
- Trombone Shorty & Orleans Avenue
- Josh Ritter & The Royal City Band
- Bela Fleck & The Flecktones
- The Head & the Heart
- Vieux Farka Toure
- Robert Randolph & The Family Band
- O.A.R.

More artists are scheduled to perform at these concerts, and they will be disclosed in due time.

=== Reschedule and Cancellation ===
Due to the then-impending damages expected from Hurricane Irene, DMB Caravan was forced to cancel the Saturday and Sunday shows at Governors Island; the band still performed on Friday, along with all scheduled acts for that day. On September 1, DMB Caravan announced that the NYC Caravan stop had been fully rescheduled to September 16–18, and was relocated to Randall's Island. See below for more details.

== The Gorge ==
On April 21, 2011, DMB Caravan announced that it would travel to the fan-favorite venue, The Gorge Amphitheatre for Labor Day weekend (September 2–4). This marks the sixth year that Dave Matthews Band will perform at The Gorge for Labor Day Weekend, and is the 16th year that they have performed at the venue.

=== Lineup ===
- Dave Matthews Band
- Dispatch
- The Roots
- Gogol Bordello
- John Butler Trio
- Josh Ritter & The Royal City Band
- Edward Sharpe and the Magnetic Zeros
- Blind Pilot
- The Moondoggies
- Lindsay Fuller

More artists are scheduled to perform at these concerts, and they will be disclosed in due time.

== Randalls Island ==
On September 1, DMB Caravan announced that the postponed Governors Island shows were relocated to Randalls Island. The new dates are September 16–18, with DMB still headlining all three nights. Fans who purchased a three-day ticket to Governors Island will be permitted to attend all three concerts at Randall's Island. Single day ticket holders who purchased tickets for August 27–28 (who were also allowed to attend the August 26 show) were allowed to attend the Randall's Island show on either September 17 or 18, depending on which ticket was purchased. For three day Governors Island ticket holders who did not attend any shows, there is also an option for a full refund. A three-day ticket holder who attended the show on August 26 can receive a two-thirds refund. A new lineup of artists will be announced in the near future, along with other information pertaining to the venue and concerts.

== Tickets ==
Tickets for the Caravan festivals were sold through Dave Matthews Band Warehouse Fan Association, as well as Ticketmaster. There were two types of tickets available for the DMB Caravan. One was a 3-day pass that allowed the ticket-holder entry to all three festivals; that was $195. The other option was a VIP pass, that allowed the ticket-holder entry to all three festivals. It also gave the ticket-holder access to a sectioned-off area of each stage, VIP restrooms, free snacks, beer, and water, and a dinner buffet. Warehouse members that purchased the VIP pass also received a voucher that allowed them to get one souvenir for free. The VIP passes were $825.

=== Payment plan ===
In response to fans complaining of high ticket prices, DMB Caravan released a ticket payment plan to help fans who wanted to attend the shows. The payment plan consisted of three payments over a schedule of dates, rather than paying the full price all at once. The payment plan was available for both the three-day pass and the VIP pass. The first payment contained all shipping and convenience fees, while the second and third were flat payments with no additional charges. The three-day pass (which was usually $195), was broken into three payments of $65, while the VIP pass (which was usually $825), was three payments of $275.

== See also ==
- DaveMatthewsBand.com
- DaveMatthewsBandCaravan.com
