= Ramboll =

Danish architecture, engineering and consulting group

Coordinates: 55°37′38.52″N 12°34′45.37″E

Rambøll Group A/S
- Type: Private
- Industry: Architecture; Engineering; Consultancy
- Founded: 1945; 81 years ago, in Copenhagen, Denmark
- Founder: Børge Johannes Rambøll and Johan Georg Hannemann
- Headquarters: Copenhagen, Denmark
- Key people: Christian Jensby (CEO)
- Revenue: ▲DKK 17,300 million (2025)
- Net income: ▲DKK 898 million (2025)
- Owner: Rambøll Foundation
- Number of employees: 18,000+ (2025)
- Website: ramboll.com

Rambøll Group A/S, also known as "Ramboll", is a Danish multinational architecture, engineering, and consulting company. In the past 25 years, the company has expanded from being a business mainly focused on the Nordic region, to having offices in more than 35 countries, with more than 18,000 employees working on projects across the world. Much of the company's activity is centred on Europe, North America, but also in emerging markets. Ramboll has been listed among the world's top 15 international design firms in 2023.

The company's main work is for clients in the Buildings, Transport, Energy, Environment & Health, Water, Management Consulting, and Architecture & Landscape sectors.

== History ==
=== 1945–1991: Foundation and initial growth ===
Ramboll was founded in October 1945 as Rambøll & Hannemann in Copenhagen by a pair of engineers, Børge Johannes Rambøll (1911–2009) and Johan Georg Hannemann (1907–1980). Both had studied at the Technical University of Denmark (DTU) and were heavily motivated to be involved in the rebuilding effort following the devastation of the Second World War. One of the first undertakings of the newly-formed company was the construction of a ferris wheel for Copenhagen’s Tivoli Gardens.

During 1950, Rambøll & Hannemann built Denmark’s first giant radio transmission mast; despite a length of 142m, this mast weighed just 28 tonnes, being 12 tonnes lighter and using 30 percent less steel than competing designs. Later that decade, the company secured major contracts with the Danish broadcast engineering services (‘Radioingeniørtjenesten’) to erect broadcast towers across both Denmark and Norway. This experience contributed to future undertakings, including work on high-tension-line towers for power plants as well as with the Norwegian telephone directorate.

By the start of the 1960, the firm had around 30 employees; by the end of the decade, it had expanded to 170 employees as the undertakings it was involved in not only became more numerous but also more diversified. During the 1960s, the company worked on incineration plants and waste management projects for the first time; environmental affairs proved to be a key new area of growth. Rambøll & Hannemann started engineering what it referred to as future-proof buildings, such as the 16-storey National Hospital at the heart of Copenhagen (opened in 1970).

During 1972, the ownership of the company was transferred to a newly-created employee-controlled foundation. The stated aims of this move included the desire for all profits generated to be used to continue the development of Rambøll & Hannemann, to safeguard its long-term future and independence, as well as to benefit its employees, clients and communities. By this point, the company had offices in both Copenhagen and Aarhus, a branch office was opened in Oslo in 1976. During the 1980s, Børge Rambøll formulated the Ramboll Philosophy, which had since served as the basis for the organisation's values, culture and working practices.

=== 1991–2003: Expansion in the Nordic region ===
In 1991, the company merged with B. Højlund Rasmussen A/S, greatly expanding its multidisciplinary reach. The combined entity initially traded as Rambøll, Hannemann & Højlund, however, during the mid 1990s, the company name was shortened to Rambøll.

During the late 1990s, the company decided to make use of digital tools in the execution of a railway electrification scheme that it had been tasked with. Covering 350 km of tracks and 20,000 steel masts, it was considered to be one of Ramboll's landmark projects at that time.

During 2003, Ramboll merged with rival company Scandiaconsult; the resulting company was the largest consulting engineering firm in the Nordic region. Around this time, Danish ceased to be the business' corporate language as an increasing focus on international operations took hold.

=== 2003–present: International growth ===
In August 2006, the company acquired the Norwegian firm Storvik & Co.

In August 2007, Ramboll bought the privately owned UK based engineering firm Whitbybird. At the time of the acquisition, Whitbybird employed 680 people based at offices throughout the UK as well as in Italy, India and the United Arab Emirates.

During April 2008, Ramboll's presence in India was strengthened by acquiring the Indian telecom design company ImIsoft.

In March 2011, Ramboll bought the privately owned UK based engineering firm Gifford. Gifford also has offices around the world.

During March 2011, Ramboll acquired the power engineering section of DONG Energy (now Ørsted A/S), DONG Energy Power.

In July 2011, Ramboll Informatik was divested to the Danish IT company KMD.

During 2014, Ramboll acquired the US-based global consultancy, ENVIRON, adding more than 1,500 environmental and health science specialists in 21 countries.

In 2018, Ramboll acquired North American engineering and design consultancy OBG (formally O'Brien & Gere), adding 950 consultants to Ramboll's North American presence. By 1 January 2019, Ramboll Americas consists of engineering and science experts across Brazil, Canada, Mexico and the United States.

In December 2019, Ramboll announced the acquisition of Henning Larsen Architects, effective on 2 January 2020.

In January 2020, Ramboll acquired Web Structures.

In August 2023, Ramboll announced the acquisition of the German Consultancy firm civity Management Consultants

In August 2024, Ramboll announced the acquisition of K2 Management

In August 2024, Ramboll announced the acquisition of the German waste-to-energy engineering consultancy Wandschneider + Gutjahr Ingenieurgesellschaft mbH

In September 2024, Ramboll announced the acquisition of SCC Scientific Consulting Company as well as the data centre consulting company i3 Solutions Group

In May 2025, Ramboll announced the acquisition of the UK-based environment and sustainability consultancy Temple

In August 2025, Ramboll announced the acquisition of leading Canadian power systems consultancy, TransGrid Solutions.

In January 2026, Ramboll announced the acquisition of Envidan, adding 500 water and waster experts to its global water unit with the acquisition completing in May 2026

== Ownership ==
Almost all shares in Ramboll Group A/S are owned by the Ramboll Foundation (approx. 96.9%). The remainder are owned by Ramboll employees and Ramboll Group A/S.

== Organisation ==
Ramboll Group A/S includes a number of primary business units within Markets and Geographies spanning the EU and US, and with branches and offices in 35 countries.

=== Management ===
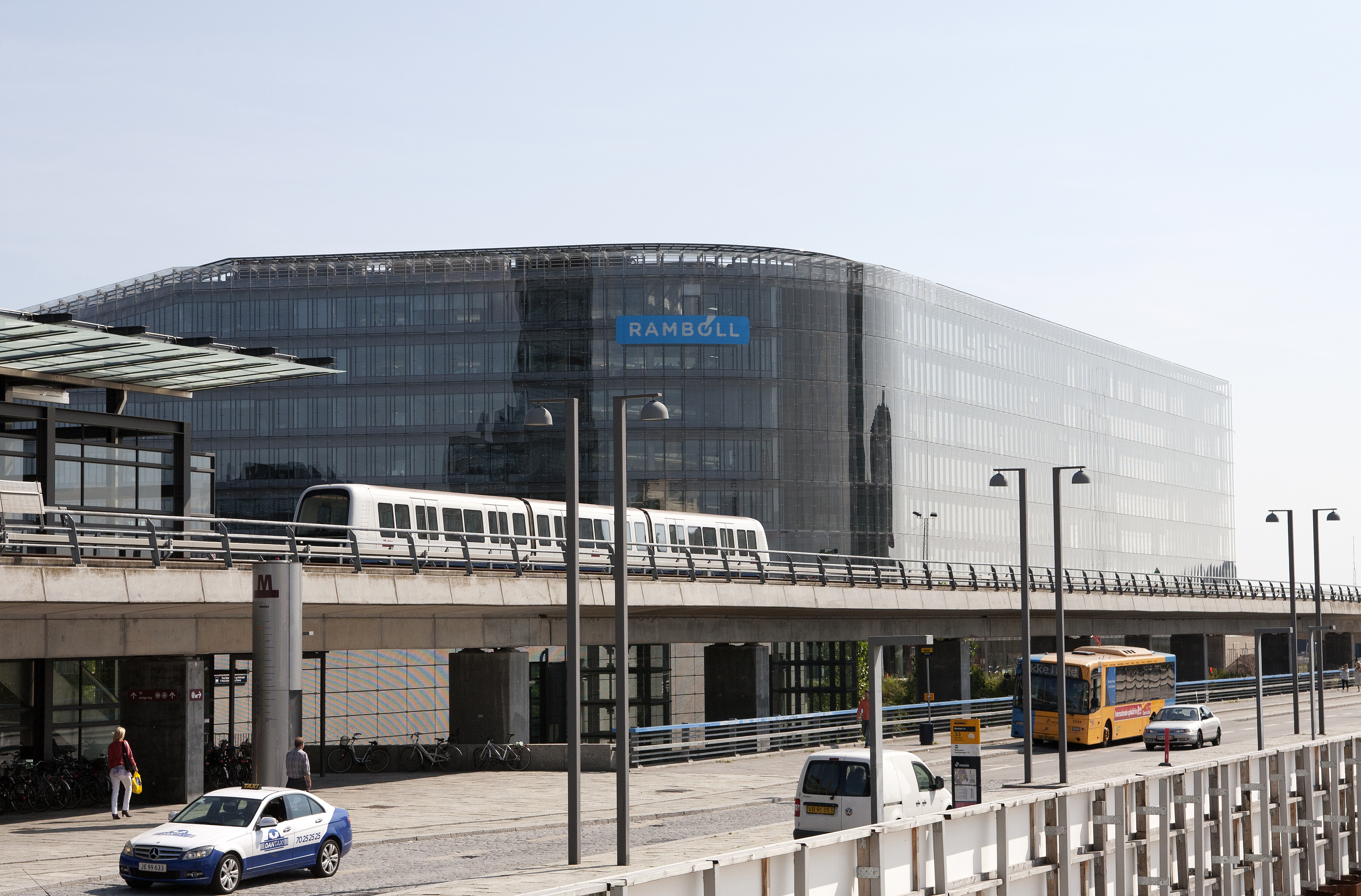
Head office in Ørestad, Copenhagen, Denmark

Ramboll's corporate governance comprises the Group Board of Directors, the Group Executive Board, the Group Leadership Team, and Corporate Management. The Board of Directors is responsible for management of Ramboll Group A/S; while the Executive Board is responsible for day-to-day operation of Ramboll Group A/S.

=== Business units ===
- Denmark
- Sweden
- Norway
- Finland
- Germany
- UK
- Americas
- Asia-Pacific
- Buildings
- Transport
- Environment & Health
- Water
- Energy
- Management Consulting

== Large scale projects ==
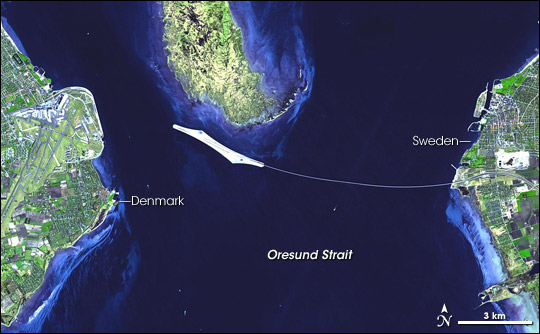
Satellite image of the Oresund Bridge.

Ramboll supports ESO during the construction of the E-ELT.

Ramboll had been involved in many large-scale projects, both domestically and internationally. During the early 2010s, the company announced that it was re-orientating itself towards major infrastructure works in regions such as the Middle East, Russia and eastern Europe.

In Denmark, one of the company's most significant undertakings has been the Oresund Bridge (1995–1999), connecting Copenhagen, Denmark with Malmö, Sweden. The bridge is one of the most important infrastructures in Denmark. The international European route E20 runs across the bridge, as does the Oresund Railway Line. The firm was also involved in the planning and construction of the Great Belt Bridge (1988–1998). This bridge connects Halsskov on Zealand with Knudshoved on Funen, 18 kilometres to its west, a two-track railway and a four-lane motorway had to be built, aligned via the small islet Sprogø in the middle of the Great Belt.

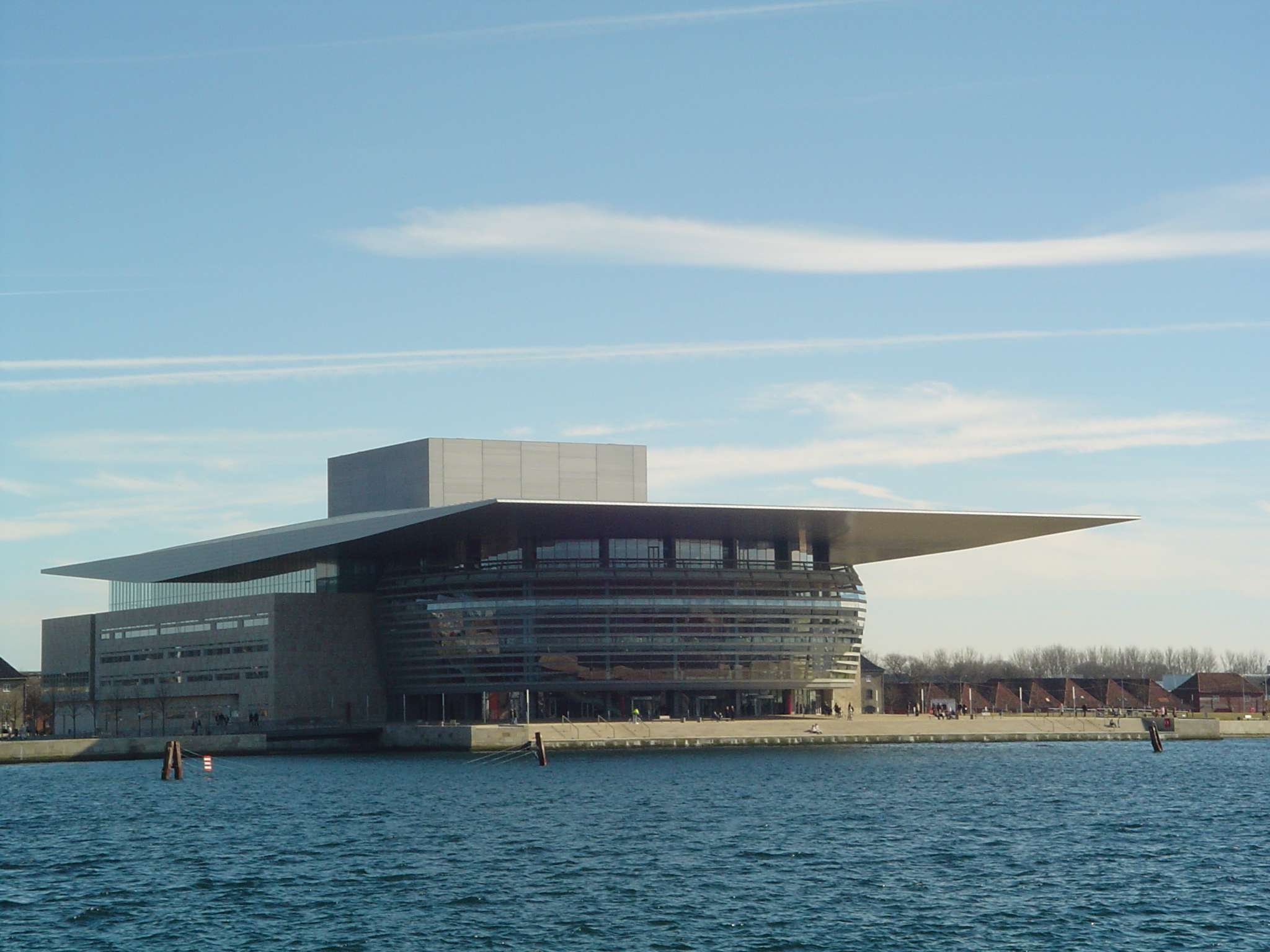
The Copenhagen Opera House 2005

Ramboll was the leading engineer on the new Royal Danish Opera, The Copenhagen Opera House. As the lead consultant on the project, Ramboll delivered engineering design, fire & safety, project management, structural engineering, geophysical engineering, geotechnical engineering, HVAC engineering, electrical engineering, bridge engineering, traffic engineering, traffic planning and traffic safety services. This was carried out between 2001 and 2004. A characteristic feature of the Opera building is the gigantic roof covering the entire building stretching all the way to the harbour front. Measuring 158 metres x 90 metres, the Opera roof is one of the largest roof constructions in the world. The innovative design of the roof, which Ramboll has projected in cooperation with Henning Larsen Architects, was the reason for the Opera winning "The 2008 IABSE Outstanding Structure Award".

Ramboll were the structural engineers for the new Tate Modern extension, opened on 17 June 2016 in London, the world's most visited museum of modern art. The company has also provided services to Network Rail's Digital Railway programme.

Ramboll is currently working on several projects concerning linking the infrastructure of the Nordic countries. Among these are projects under the Trans-European Networks and the Fehmarn Belt Fixed Link, the world's longest immersed tunnel.

Internationally, Ramboll has also marked itself by being involved in projects such as Chicago Lakeside Development, Ferrari World in Abu Dhabi, King Abdullah Petroleum Studies and Research Center in Saudi Arabia, the National Museum of Art, Architecture and Design in Oslo, and infrastructure upgrades on the Falkland Islands. Perhaps most unusually, Ramboll has undertaken work in Antarctica.
