= Ramboll Environ =

American consulting firm

Ramboll Environ, Inc.
- Type: Privately held company
- Industry: environmental consulting, health sciences, engineering, regulatory affairs, product safety, sustainability, EHS program management, risk management, construction management, design and planning
- Predecessor: ENVIRON
- Founded: Washington, D.C. (1982)
- Defunct: January 1, 2018
- Fate: Acquired on January 1, 2014
- Successor: Ramboll
- Headquarters: Arlington, Virginia
- Area served: Worldwide
- Key people: Thomas Vetrano, President and Managing Director

Environ was a privately held, international environmental, safety and health sciences consulting firm headquartered in Arlington, Virginia. Environ had operations across 21 countries when it was acquired in December 2014 by Danish-based consultancy group Ramboll.

In a transition period, legacy Environ was rebranded as Ramboll Environ, Inc. Since January 1, 2018, Environ no longer exists as a separate business entity, and is now part of the Water and Environment & Health divisions of Ramboll.

== History ==
The firm was founded as Environ in Washington, D.C., in 1982.

In 1996 the firm acquired EAG, a consulting firm in the United Kingdom. In 2003 Environ merged with Applied Epidemiology, Inc., a provider of epidemiological consulting services in occupational health, environmental health and injury, and disability research. Environ then merged in 2005 with The ADVENT Group, an engineering consulting firm specializing in industrial wastewater management and related areas.

In 2007 Environ acquired Boelter Associates, Inc., a consulting firm with expertise in industrial hygiene and building forensics. In 2009, the firm acquired Brazilian consultancy ARQUIPÉLAGO Engenharia Ambiental Ltda.(Arquipélago).

Environ acquired Mexican firm Hicks Environmental in February 2014, expanding into Mexico with an office in Monterrey. In March 2014, Environ established operations in Yangon, Myanmar, becoming the first global environmental consultancy in the country.

The Danish company Ramboll acquired Environ 2014-12-16. January 1, 2018, legacy Environ was included in the Water and Environment & Health divisions of Ramboll, and Environ no longer exists as a separate business entity.

== Operations and services ==
The firm offered various environmental, health and safety, sustainability and health sciences services, including air quality and climate change management, regulatory compliance assistance, due diligence, remedial design and engineering, ecology and sediment management, and risk and exposure assessment and management.

In its April 28, 2014 edition, Engineering News-Record ranked Environ Holdings, Inc., as the 27th largest pure design firm; the 35th largest design firm in international markets; and the 49th largest overall U.S. design firm.

=== Environment ===
Environ provided assistance in assessing and mitigating potential environmental risks. Its services included air quality management, climate change and energy management, due diligence, ecology and sediment management, risk assessment and management, and site investigation and remediation.

=== Facilities ===
The firm provided assistance so that industrial facilities are regulatory compliant, managed potential liabilities, and assessed environmental, health, and safety risks when making an acquisition. These services included building performance and property loss consulting, compliance assistance, dose reconstruction, occupational health and safety; and site investigation and remediation.

=== Human health ===
Environ assessed and addressed potential human health risks associated with environmental, residential and workplace exposures and product-related exposures. This work included product safety and stewardship, industrial hygiene and safety, risk assessment and management, and industrial chemical safety evaluations.

== Notable projects ==
At the request of the Hong Kong Environmental Protection Department the company developed a comprehensive air quality model system to address air quality concerns, including ozone, particulate matter, and other pollutants due to local sources, as well as transport from China and other areas in Asia.

Environ was engaged to deliver a wide range of social and environmental services to international standards related to a 13,000-km-long fibre optic submarine telecommunications cable system running the entire length of the Indian Ocean coast of Africa, from South Africa to Egypt.

In the United States, the firm worked with the Marathon Petroleum Company at its major gulf coast refinery in Garyville, Louisiana, to develop a biotreatment to reduce volatile organic compound emissions at oil and chemical refineries. The company asserts that the system achieves regulatory compliance and cost savings of an order of magnitude.

Their studies uncovered the chemical mechanism that established a link between certain types of gypsum wallboard (Chinese drywall) and corrosive effects on copper and silver components in residential properties across the southeastern United States. Environ scientists recognized and published findings about the progressive nature of the corrosion.

BP Remediation Management awarded Environ four framework agreements for a range of strategic worldwide environmental services. Two agreements call for the firm to provide a broad spectrum of environmental services for upstream, refining and marketing, shipping and remediation that include regulatory compliance; multimedia modeling; environmental, social and health impact assessments; natural resource management; due diligence support; and sustainability services around the world. Two additional agreements focus on global inland and offshore oil spill preparedness and response planning.

The company and another prominent engineering and scientific firm, Exponent, were employed by Georgia-Pacific to conduct research intended for its defense in an asbestos-related lawsuit. Controversially, the dissemination of the research was controlled by Georgia-Pacific.

== Awards and honors ==
An environmental impact assessment (EIA) prepared for the proposed expansion of the Kemira Chemicals production plant in Sastamala, Finland received an honorary award from the Finnish National EIA Association for “exceptionally good assessment of risks and the potential environmental impacts of disturbances and emergency situations”.

The U.S. Environmental Protection Agency USEPA selected Carl Adams to join its task force for the Wastewater Treatment and Related Modeling Technical Workshop. During the opening panel of the first task force meeting, Adams spoke on Zero Discharge of Water from Hydrofracturing Activities, a concept developed to recycle all wastewaters related to hydraulic fracturing activities, including spills and rainwater. The concept involves no contact with air, ground and surface water or soils.

In January 2013, the Climate Change Business Journal awarded Environ its Gold Medal Business Achievement Award in Energy and Carbon Management. DP World awarded Environ the Golden Dhow Award for its environmental consultancy services to the London Gateway super port.

In 2011, the American Academy of Environmental Engineers Excellence in Environmental Engineering Competition awarded Environ its Grand Prize, Research for Environ’s volatile organic compount treatment technology. Also in 2011, the firm won the UK's Edie Environmental Excellence Award: Best Consultancy for Due Diligence. Environ won the Chemical Industry Awards REACH Service Provider Award 2010.

== Published articles ==
Ramboll Environ professionals published more than 20 articles in peer-reviewed and scientific publications since 2013.

In 2011, Joseph V. Rodricks, co-founder of Environ, prepared a chapter on exposure science appearing in the third edition of the National Academies of Science’s Reference Manual on Scientific Evidence. He has also written for the International Journal of Toxicology.
