= Bobby Long (musician) =

British singer-songwriter (born 1985)

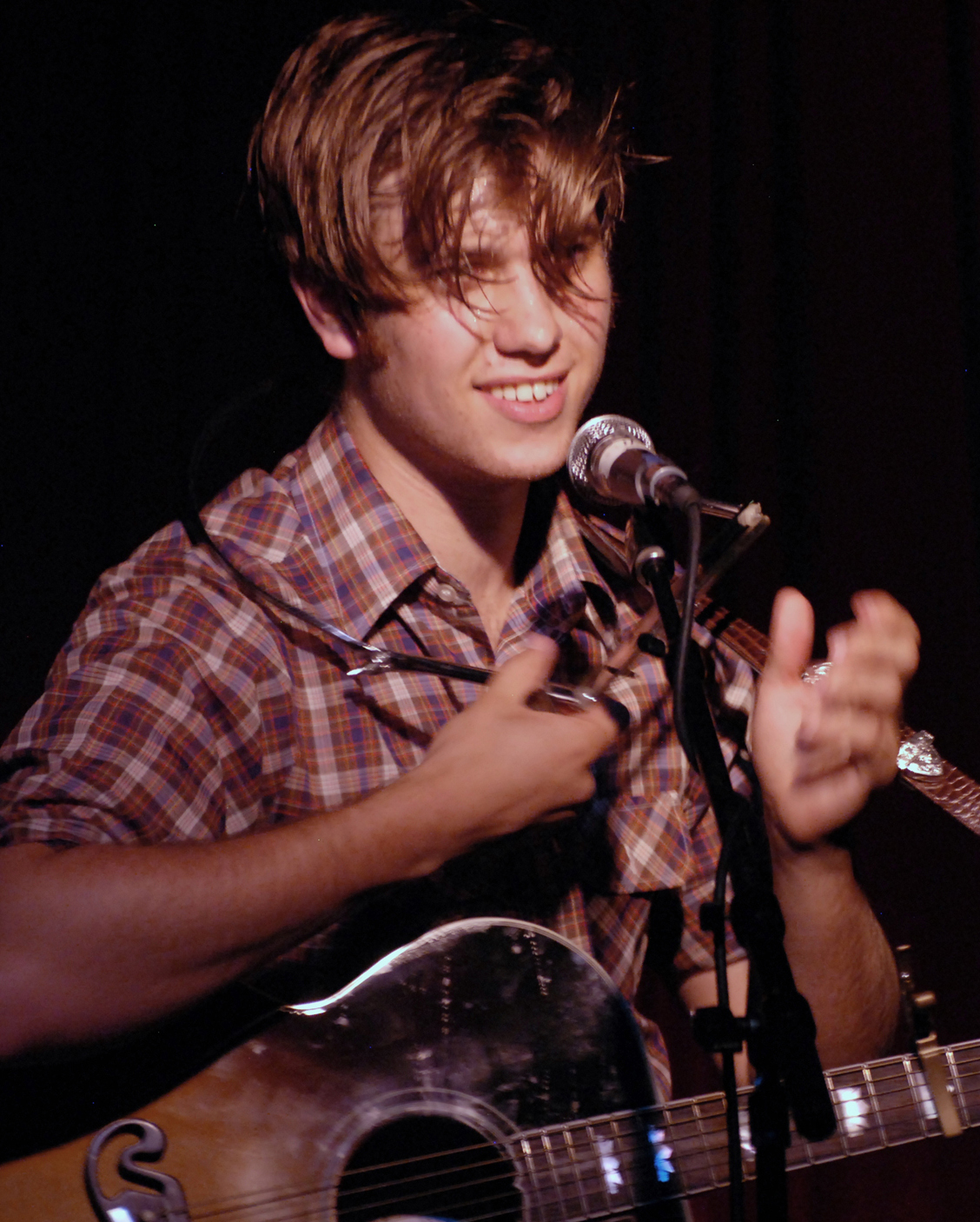
- Bobby Long performing in Los Angeles

Background information
- Born: Robert Thomas Jerome Long; 18 September 1985 (age 41); Wigan, Greater Manchester, England
- Origin: England
- Genres: Folk, Americana, Rock, Country, Blues
- Occupations: Singer-songwriter, musician
- Instruments: Vocals, guitar, harmonica, cello
- Years active: 2008–present
- Labels: Compass, ATO, MapleMusic (Canada)
- Website: bobbylong.info

Bobby Long (born Robert Thomas Long, 18 September 1985) is a British singer-songwriter, whose largely acoustic body of work has its roots in folk. Born in Wigan, Greater Manchester, England, he moved at the age of four to Calne, Wiltshire, where he grew up, though he still holds deep roots in Wigan. He currently resides in New York.

== Early life ==
Long learned cello and guitar and started writing songs when he was 18. His earliest performing experience was as lead guitarist in a local grunge band. Long moved to London in 2005 to attend London Metropolitan University where he studied sound and media for films. He began playing open-mic nights at local clubs, meeting several like-minded young musicians, among them Sam Bradley, Marcus Foster, Jack Whitehall, and Robert Pattinson, whose careers as actors were just beginning. Long's career trajectory took a major leap when Pattinson performed the song "Let Me Sign," co-written by Long and Foster, in the 2008 blockbuster vampire film Twilight.

== Career ==
Long graduated from college in June 2009 (earning a degree in music for films after writing his senior thesis on the social impact of American folk music) and commenced performing full-time. A spring series of showcase dates introduced him to American audiences in New York, Los Angeles and Nashville. By July, he embarked on the critically well-received "Dangerous Summer" tour. Long fans, who first discovered his music via the Twilight soundtrack, turned out for shows throughout the U.S. and Canada and pushed his MySpace page well over one million page views. He recorded the 10-song collection Dirty Pond Songs to be available at his shows. Recorded in his London bedroom, it included traffic noises and all. "Left to Lie" from Dirty Pond Songs, became an iTunes favourite, topping the site's "Unsigned" chart and reaching #8 its folk music chart. "The Bounty of Mary Jane" from Dirty Pond Songs and a live version of his "Being a Mockingbird," recorded at Arlene's Grocery in New York City, were also released via iTunes. "The Dangerous Summer" tour continued until the end of 2009, logging some 80 performances in all.

Long embarked upon the "Left to Lie" tour of Europe in early 2010 and recorded his first studio CD with Grammy-winning producer, Liam Watson at Toe Rag Studios in London. He also released a collection of live performances from the Dangerous Summer 2009 tour. "My Darling Belle" from that collection went to No. 2 on iTunes' Singer-Songwriter chart.

On 23 April 2010, Long officially signed with ATO Records, the label co-founded by musician Dave Matthews and his manager Corin Capshaw. He opened on tour for Matt Pond PA during which time he met the Kalob Griffin Band, also known as KGB, who would become his backing band for subsequent US dates that year, including the Mile High Festival in Denver, the xPoNential Music Festival in Philadelphia and The Troubadour in Los Angeles. He also did a solo tour of Europe in the fall, followed by North American dates supporting Michael Franti.

ATO Records released Bobby Long's debut album, entitled "A Winter Tale," on 1 February 2011. Much of that year was devoted to touring in support of the album, including appearances on The Tonight Show with Jay Leno on 3 February and on the CBS Early Show on 8 August. He also played high-profile shows like the Bonnaroo Music Festival, Austin City Limits Festival and the Dave Matthews Band Caravan in both Atlantic City and Chicago.

In July 2011, Long recorded a five-song EP called "The Backing Singer" with violinist Jack Dawson and producer Jesse Lauter, followed by fall shows in Canada, the United States and Europe as part of his "Losing My Brotherhood" tour.

Long started 2012 by recording his second album in Los Angeles, produced by Ted Hutt (Old Crow Medicine Show, Flogging Molly) at Kingsize Studios. He toured in support of Rodrigo y Gabriela, Iron & Wine, The Mother Hips and Steve Winwood as well as playing his own shows. In a departure from music, Long published his first book of poetry called "Losing My Brotherhood" and did a performance/poetry reading at the Barnes and Noble store in Los Angeles. After Hurricane Sandy hit the east coast of the United States in October 2012, Long donated his 1965 Epiphone Cabellero guitar to the Red Cross Hurricane Relief Fund. For the victims, he later participated in the benefit "A Love Letter to New York" that also included Joan Osborne, Matisyahu, and others.

A three-week tour of Europe preceded the 19 February 2013 release of "Wishbone," Long's second album for ATO. He toured the U.S. in the spring with a new young band—making two appearances on cable TV's "The Artie Lange Show"—and in the summer with mandolin player Rob Dwyer (of KGB), joined occasionally by violinist Jack Dawson. This lineup appeared on AXS Television's AXS Live program and at the Troubadour in Los Angeles.

Long devoted 2014 to writing and preparing to record his third album, playing sporadic solo shows in between. In June, he launched a fund-raising campaign on PledgeMusic to finance the album and reached his goal in a scant five weeks. The album was recorded in a two-week period in September, produced by Mark Hallman at his Congress House Studios in Austin, Texas. The short film called See Seven States from Rock City, featuring Long's song "In Ashes" and two others, received its premiere showing at the Williamsburg Independent Film Festival in Williamsburg, Brooklyn, New York in November that year.

In 2015, Long signed an agreement with Compass Records in Nashville for the album he had now named "Ode To Thinking" after the first track on it. With photography from a friend, Jamie Strachan and cover design from a friend (and Grammy nominee) Brett Kilroe, "Ode To Thinking" was released on 7 August 2015, and the "Ode To Thinking" tour of the U.S., Europe and U.K. in support of it began. This followed his first ever appearance at England's famed Glastonbury Music Festival on 27 June 2015, where he performed with a band on the Acoustic Stage.

== Personal life ==
Bobby Long is single and has two children, lives in Jersey City.

== Albums ==
- 2009: Dirty Pond Songs (self-released)
- 2009: Live at Arlene's Grocery (self-released)
- 2010: Dangerous Summer 2009 (self-released)
- 2010: Stranger Songs EP (ATO Records)
- 2011: A Winter Tale (ATO Records)
- 2011: The Backing Singer EP (ATO Records)
- 2013: Wishbone (ATO Records)
- 2015: Ode to Thinking (Compass Records)
- 2016: Ode vinyl (Compass Records)
- 2019: Sultans(Compass Records)

== Singles ==
- 2009: "Left to Lie"
- 2009: "Being a Mockingbird" (Live)
- 2009: "The Bounty of Mary Jane"
- 2010: "My Darling Belle"
- 2011: "Who Have You Been Loving"
- 2013: "Devil Moon"
- 2015: "I'm Not Going Out Tonight"
- 2016: "Ode to Thinking"
