= South Works =

Chicago development site named for former steel mill

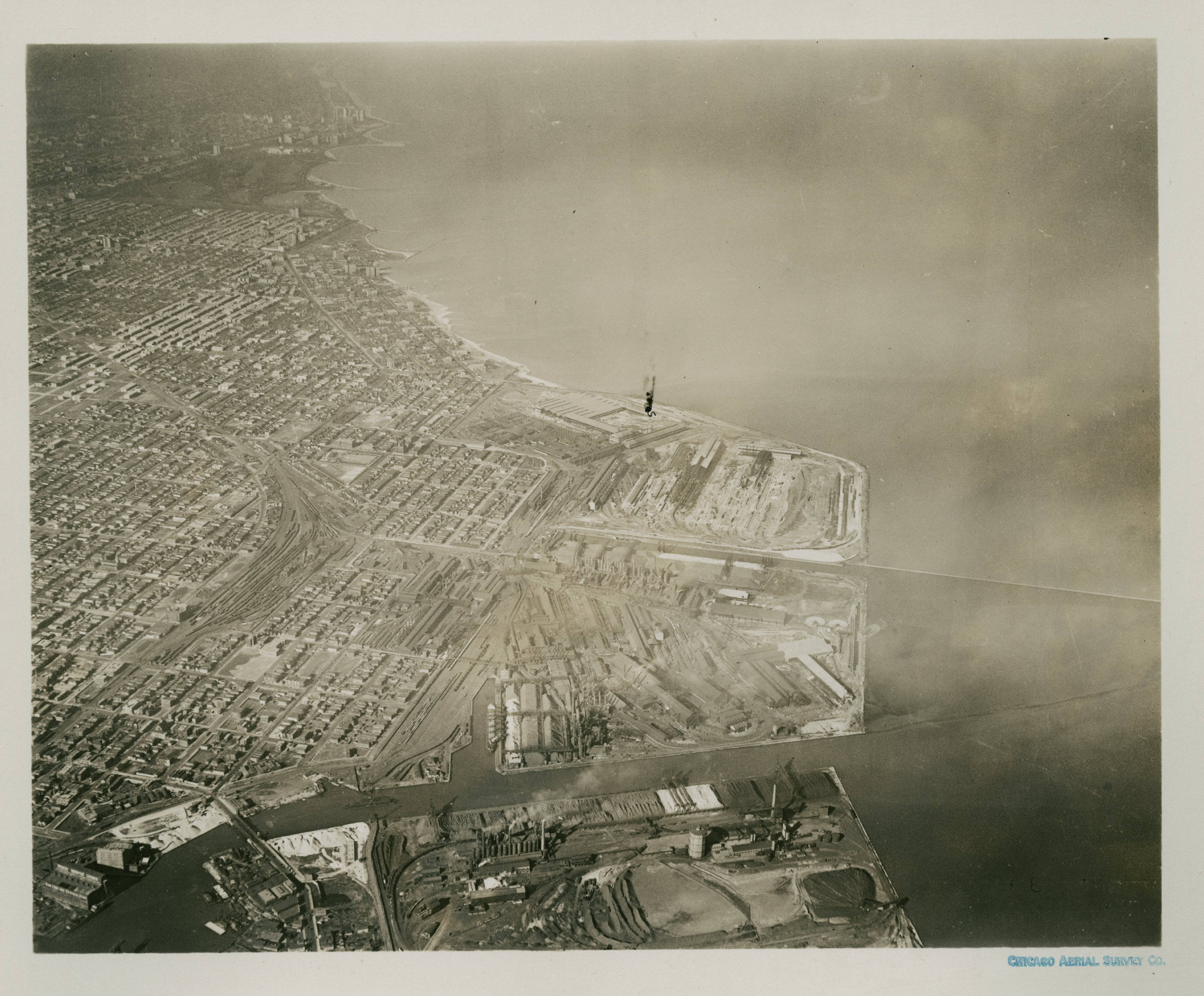
- Aerial view of U.S. Steel South Works, 1930
- Built: 1880; 146 years ago
- Operated: June 14, 1882; 143 years ago– April 10, 1992; 34 years ago
- Location: Chicago, Illinois
- Coordinates: 41°44′30″N 87°32′0″W
- Industry: Steel
- Area: 575 acres (233 ha)
- Owner: U.S. Steel
- Defunct: April 10, 1992; 34 years ago

South Works is an area in the South Chicago part of Chicago, Illinois, near the mouth of the Calumet River, that was previously home to a now-closed and vacant U.S. Steel mill called "South Works," which gave its name to the area. US Steel used to call each of its plants “works,” modified by a name of the plant’s locality—for example, Gary Works, the US Steel plant at Gary, Indiana.

== History ==
=== Steel works ===
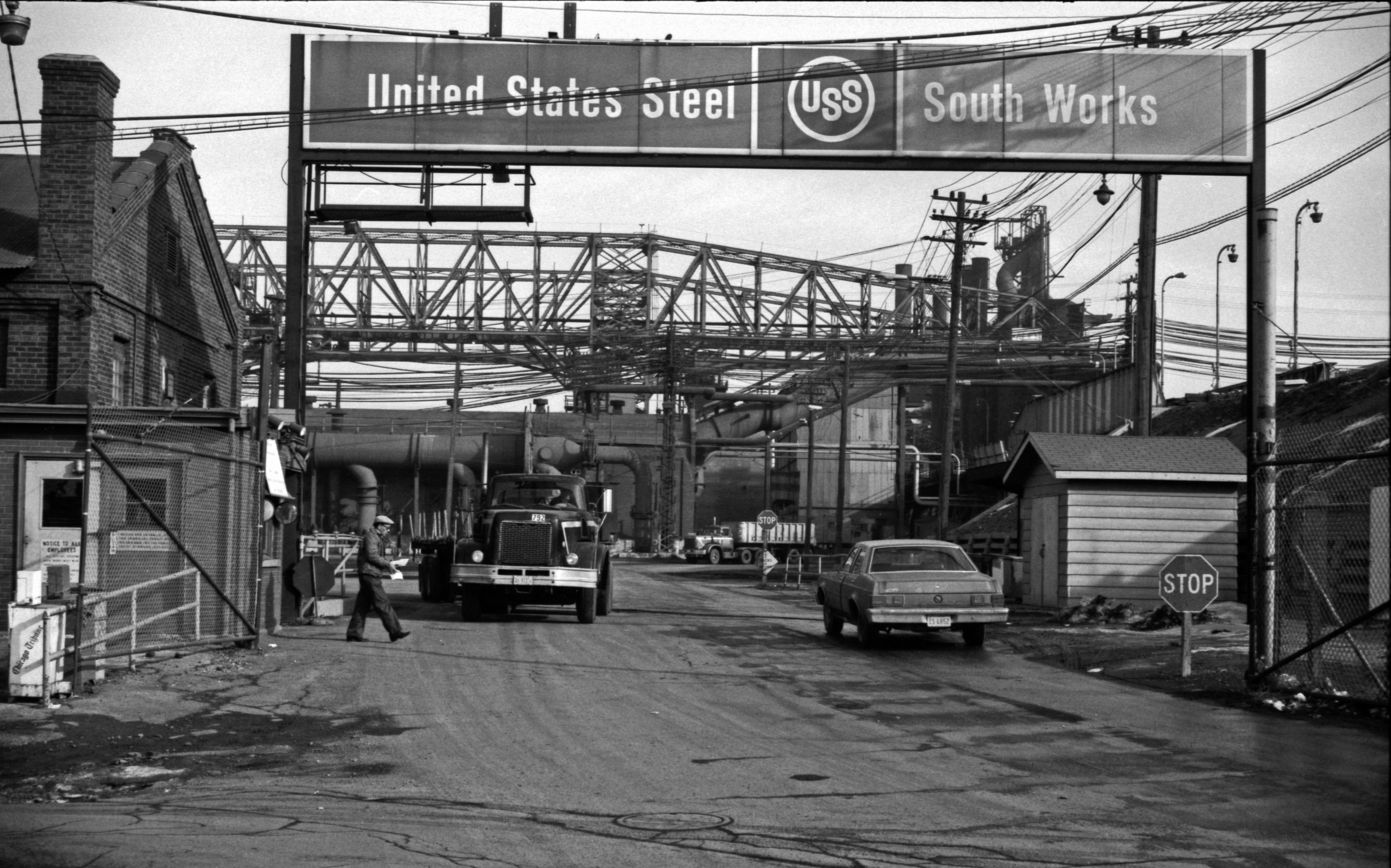
Entrance to U.S. Steel South Works

The facility that eventually became South Works began in 1857 under the name of the North Chicago Rolling Mill, which was located in the northern part of the city of Chicago. The plant later moved to South Chicago because raw materials could be shipped in via Lake Michigan, as well as an existing labor pool and available fresh water from the lake and the Calumet River. In 1889, the facility merged with three other steel mills to form a new company called Illinois Steel, which later became part of Federal Steel. By 1901, the company was under the control of US Steel. By 1951, the South Works boasted 11 blast furnaces, 8 electric furnaces, and 12 rolling mills, and employed some 15,000 employees.

At its peak, the steel mill employed some 20,000 people, which spurred the development of a new community centered on the mill. The mill complex covered a total of 600 acres (240 ha), part of which had been reclaimed from Lake Michigan with molten slag.

Beginning in the 1970s, the facility began downsizing due to a shifting market for steel, and by the end of the decade the number of workers at the plant had declined to 10,000. The mill continued its decline, and on January 9, 1992, it was announced that the facility was to close. On April 10, the plant permanently shut down with fewer than 700 people employed at the time of its closing.

=== Post closure ===
Since the steel mill shut down, the area has stood mostly vacant, with only a single brick building and the remains of a ship dock standing. The Solo Cup Company purchased 120 acres (49 ha) of the site, with the intent of constructing a factory, but later dropped the plans. In 2004, a new park was constructed on the lakefront, with topsoil composed of dried mud obtained from Peoria Lake.

From July 8–10, 2011, the Dave Matthews Band hosted the Dave Matthews Band Caravan at part of the site, 150 acres (61 ha) of which had been cleared of vegetation and scrap materials, resurfaced with wood chips and renamed Lakeside for the event. The three-day festival hosted numerous artists and bands, and was attended by about 100,000 people.

=== Current state and Chicago Lakeside Development ===
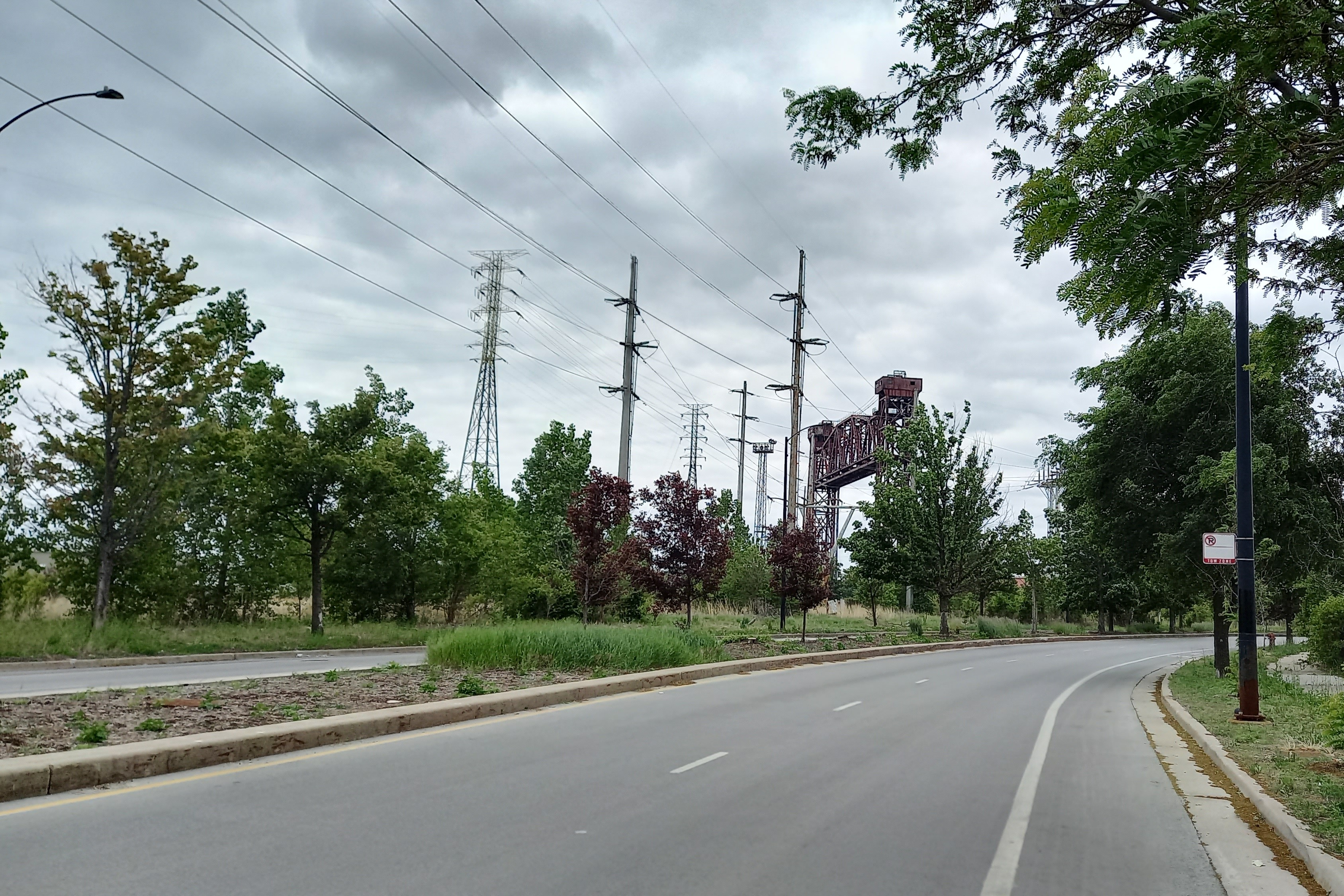
Lake Shore Drive extension at the site of the former South Works

U.S. Steel, the developer McCaffrey Interests, and the City of Chicago proposed an ambitious plan for an entirely new housing and commercial complex on roughly 470 acres (190 ha) of the site. Known as the Chicago Lakeside Development, the proposed plan "includes zoning approvals for approximately 13,575 single family dwellings and high-rise units, 17,500,000 SF of retail, the newly-extended South Lake Shore Drive, 125 acres of open space/parks with bike paths, a 1,500-slip boat marina and a new high school." In February 2016, McCaffrey announced that U.S. Steel had declined to proceed and the project was cancelled, but they would proceed with the project if U.S. Steel was willing to sell the land.

In late January 2017 it was announced that U.S. Steel had agreed upon the sale of South Works to a joint venture between Barcelona Housing Systems and Emerald Living/WELink. Their plan included a large residential development with up to 12,000 homes. The sale price has not been disclosed, but reports indicate U.S. Steel had sought $55 to $80 million for the property. In April 2018, it was reported that soil contamination on the site could create a barrier to the new development. However, developer Emerald Living remains "very committed to the New South Works project."

Currently, the site consists of two publicly accessible parks, Steelworkers Park and Park 566. Steelworker's Park includes a large prairie restoration and a monument to the U.S. Steel workers and their families. Park 566 is proposed for redevelopment as open park space with natural areas, fitness trails, and lakeside overlooks. The rest of the site is closed to the public.

In July 2024, a plan was announced to build a quantum computing facility on the site, to be operational as soon as 2027.
