= O'Brien & Gere =

OBG
- Company type: Employee Owned Corporation
- Industry: Engineering, construction, operations, and fabrication
- Founded: Syracuse, New York (1945) (as Earl F. O'Brien, William S. Gere, and Glenn D. Holmes)
- Headquarters: Syracuse, New York, United States
- Key people: Jim Fox, Chief Executive Officer & Chairman of the Board; Joseph M. McNulty, Chief Financial Officer
- Number of employees: >850 (2015)
- Website: www.obg.com

OBG was an American provider of engineering, construction, and operational services for: industrial, municipal, Federal, food and beverage, higher education, and life sciences clients. This company was entirely employee owned and private and employed over 900 employees within all of their offices. They are headquartered in Syracuse, New York and have regional offices in 24 cities throughout the United States. OBG was bought by a Danish company Ramboll in December 2018.

== History ==
OBG, formally O'Brien & Gere, was founded in 1945 under the partnership of Earl F. O'Brien, William S. Gere, and Glenn D. Holmes. The company was established in Central New York and its headquarters remains there today.

== Services ==
OBG offers a variety of services: Municipal, Industrial, Higher Education, and Federal.
