= Chelsea Heights, Atlantic City =

Neighborhood of Atlantic City, US

Coordinates: 39°21′21″N 74°27′45″W

Chelsea Heights
- Neighborhood
- Interactive map of Chelsea Heights
- Country: United States
- State: New Jersey
- County: Atlantic County
- City: Atlantic City

Government
  - Body: City Council of Atlantic City
  - Rank: 1. 1

Population (2021)
  - Total: 2,351
- Time zone: Eastern Standard Time
- Postal code: 08401
- Area code: 609

Chelsea Heights is a neighborhood of Atlantic City located west of Absecon Island and the Intracoastal Waterway. It is connected to Atlantic City via the Route 40 bridge, and is also connected to Ventnor Heights, which is connected to Absecon Island via the Dorset Avenue bridge. In 2021, the population of Chelsea Heights was 2,351. The largely suburban neighborhood is ranked the most cleanest neighborhood in Atlantic City. Most homes in the neighborhood were rebuilt in the last 30-35 years as part of the City of Atlantic City's efforts to revitalize the southern area of Atlantic City.

== Demographics ==
According to 2020 US Census Bureau data, the neighborhood is 39.1% Hispanic, 23.7% Asian, 22.6% White and 16% Black/African American. 73.4% (or 1,726) of the population is eligible to vote.

== Education ==
Students from preschool to eighth grade attend the Chelsea Heights School, which is part of the Atlantic City School District. Ninth through twelfth grade education is provided by default by the Atlantic City High School.
