= The Nights (band) =

American soul funk band

The Nights were an American soul funk band produced by H.B. Barnum. The band produced only one self-titled album in 1976 and then disbanded. Members included Anthony Brannum, Ira Clark, Anthony Williams, Dennis Hagger, Joey L. Mingo, Rickey Blain, and Vincent Rocto.

== Discography ==
- The Nights, album ABC Records 1976

Singles:

- "Country Girl" / "Let There Be Love" ABC Records 1976
- "(When You Dropped Your Guard) Love Knocked You Down" / "Let There Be Love" (7") Little Star Records LS-1577 1976
