= Jimmy Callahan (actor) =

American actor (1891–1957)

- Born: June 16, 1891; Philadelphia, Pennsylvania, U.S.
- Died: September 21, 1957 (aged 66); Belleville, New Jersey, U.S.
- Occupation: Actor
- Years active: 1921–1925

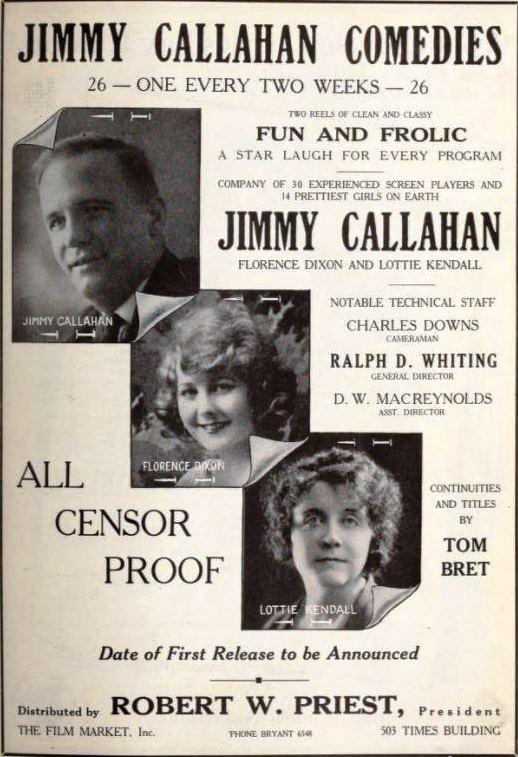
1921 advertisement with Jimmy Callahan, Florence Dixon, and Lottie Kendall

Jimmy Callahan (Philadelphia, Pennsylvania, June 16, 1891 – September 21, 1957, Belleville, New Jersey) was an American actor who made several silent comedy short films in the 1920s.

== Filmography ==
- Jimmy's Last Night Out (1921)
- The Stowaway (1921)
- Props (1921)
- Wild Women (1921)
- A Lucky Dog (1925)
- October Morn (1925)
- A Wonderful Wallop (1925)
- The Huckleberry Gulch (1925)
- A One Man Woman (1925)
- The Poor Millionaire (1925)
- On the Isle of Sap (1925)
- A Tough Night (1925)
- His Future Father-in-Law (1925)
