= Chicago Lakeside Development =

Proposed redevelopment in Chicago, Illinois

- Interactive map of Chicago Lakeside Development
- Coordinates: 41.742°N 87.536°W
- Status: Canceled; area now used for future quantum computing campus

Technical details
- Size: 600 acres (240 ha)

Chicago Lakeside Development was a proposed redevelopment of about 600 acres on the former U.S. Steel South Works site on the South Side of Chicago, lying about 10 miles (16 km) south of the Chicago Loop. The plan calls for 13,575 new homes, 17,500,000 square feet (1,630,000 m^{2}) of retail and other commercial space, a new high school, 1,500-slip marina, 125 acres of public land, lakefront access, new bike paths, and commuter rail and bus service would house 150,000 people. The Chicago Lakeside Development Master Plan will take an estimated 25 to 45 years to complete and will cost more than $4 billion in both public and private funds. The project was placed on indefinite hold in February 2016.

== Project status ==
The South Works site has been vacant since 1992, when Pittsburgh-based U.S. Steel closed its plants. September 15, 2010 Chicago Plan Commission approved the project . Chicago Lakeside Development, LLC a joint venture between McCaffery Interests and United States Steel Corporation are developing the development. Phase I of Chicago Lakeside Development includes a mixed-use shopping and residential district known as The Market Common with construction to begin in 2012. The project was estimated to generate more than 1,500 temporary construction jobs and 1,000 permanent jobs when complete . In February 2016, McCaffrey announced that U.S. Steel had declined to proceed and the project as cancelled, but they would proceed with the project if U.S. Steel was willing to sell the land.

== See also ==
- Sandi Jackson
- United States Steel Corporation
- Ramboll's project description
