= International Journal of Toxicology =

- Discipline: Toxicology
- Language: English
- Edited by: Mary Beth Genter

Publication details
- History: 1982-present
- Publisher: SAGE Publications
- Frequency: Bimonthly
- Impact factor: 1.205 (2016)

Standard abbreviations
- ISO 4: Int. J. Toxicol.

Indexing
- CODEN: IJTOFN
- ISSN: 1091-5818 (print); 1092-874X (web)
- LCCN: 97660697
- OCLC no.: 35843664

Links
- Journal homepage; Online access; Online archive

International Journal of Toxicology (IJT) is a peer-reviewed academic journal that publishes papers in the field of toxicology. The journal's editor is Mary Beth Genter, PhD (University of Cincinnati). It has been in publication since 1982 and is currently published by SAGE Publications in association with American College of Toxicology.

== Scope ==
International Journal of Toxicology publishes papers on current topics of interest to toxicologists. The journal covers areas such as safety assessments, novel approaches to toxicology testing and mechanisms of toxicology. International Journal of Toxicology also publishes features articles based on symposia.

== Abstracting and indexing ==
International Journal of Toxicology is abstracted and indexed in, among other databases: SCOPUS, and the Social Sciences Citation Index. According to the Journal Citation Reports, its 2016 impact factor is 1.205, ranking it 86 out of 92 journals in the category 'Toxicology' and 213 out of 256 journals in the category 'Pharmacology & Pharmacy'.
