= Pete Kilpatrick =

American singer-songwriter

- Origin: Portland, Maine, US
- Genres: Pop rock, alternative rock, adult contemporary music
- Occupation(s): Singer-songwriter, musician
- Instrument(s): Vocals, guitar
- Website: petekilpatrickband.com

Pete Kilpatrick is an independent singer-songwriter, who has released nine records both solo and with the Pete Kilpatrick Band. Kilpatrick's work is a blend of folk and pop rock music, and he has been named Maine's Best Act and Best Vocalist four times in the Portland Best Music Awards. Kilpatrick has performed with many notable acts including Ray Lamontagne, Guster, Jason Mraz and Dave Matthews Band. In 2012, Kilpatrick and his band performed at President Obama's only campaign stop in Maine.

His music has been featured on NBC's The Office and Parks and Recreation as well as New Girl on FOX. In total, Kilpatrick's songs have appeared in over 15 network television shows on NBC, ABC, CBS, Fox, MTV, VH1, and The Oxygen Network.

== Discography ==
=== Studio albums ===
- Half Way Home
- Yesterday Love
- Louder than the Storm
- Hope in Our Hearts
- Shapes and Sounds
- Heavy Fire
- Echo
- Songs From The Green Room
- Back Roads
